= List of roads in Ottawa =

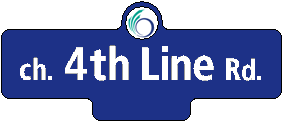
Post-amalgamation style street signs

This is a list of major roads in Ottawa, Ontario, Canada.

== Classification ==
The City of Ottawa classifies its roads in one of the following categories:

- City freeway
- Arterial road
- Major collector road
- Collector road
- Local road

signifies roads under federal government jurisdiction.

A King's Highway sign indicates a provincial road. (See Highways in Ontario for more information.)

Roads without an identifying icon are of unconfirmed classification

== List ==
- Airport Parkway
- Albert Street
- Albion Road
- Alta Vista Drive
- Anderson Road
- Aviation Parkway
- Bank Street
- Bankfield Road
- Baseline Road
- Beechwood Avenue
- Blair Road
- Booth Street
- Boundary Road
- Bridge Street
- Bronson Avenue
- Brookfield Road
- Cambrian Road
- Cameron Street
- Campeau Drive
- Carling Avenue
- Carp Road
- Carp View Road
- Castlefrank Road
- Catherine Street
- Cedarview Road
- Century Road
- Chamberlain Avenue
- Charlotte Street
- Clyde Avenue
- Colonel By Drive
- Colonial Road
- Conroy Road
- Coventry Road
- Corkstown Road
- Craig Side Road
- Dalmeny Road
- Devine Road
- Dilworth Road
- Donald B. Munro Drive
- Donnelly Drive
- Dunning Road
- Dunrobin Road
- Dwyer Hill Road
- Eagleson Road
- Earl Armstrong Road
- Elgin Street
- Fallowfield Road
- Fernbank Road
- Ferry Road
- Fisher Avenue
- Flewellyn Road
- Fourth Line Road
- Frank Kenny Road
- Franktown Road
- Galetta Side Road
- Gladstone Avenue
- Greenbank Road
- Gregoire Road
- Harbour Street
- Hawthorne Avenue
- Hawthorne Road
- Hazeldean Road
- Hemlock Road
- Heron Road
- Highway 7
- Highland Road
- Highway 174
- Highway 417
- Hog's Back Road
- Holly Acres Road
- Hope Side Road
- Hunt Club Road
- Huntley Road
- Huntmar Drive
- Industrial Avenue
- Innes Road
- Island Park Drive
- Jeanne d'Arc Boulevard
- Jockvale Road
- Katimavik Road
- Kent Street
- Kichi Zibi Mikan
- Kinburn Side Road
- King Edward Avenue
- Kirkwood Avenue
- Laurier Avenue
- Lees Avenue
- Leitrim Road
- Lester Road
- Limebank Road
- Lyon Street
- Mackenzie Avenue
- Madawaska Boulevard
- Main Street
- Maitland Avenue
- Manotick Main Street
- March Road
- Marvelville Road
- McArthur Avenue
- McBean Street
- Mer Bleue Road
- Merivale Road
- Metcalfe Street
- Milton Road
- Mitch Owens Road
- Montreal Road
- Moodie Drive
- Munster Road
- Murray Street
- Navan Road
- NCC Scenic Driveway
- Nicholas Street
- O'Connor Street
- Ogilvie Road
- Old Montreal Road
- Old Prescott Road
- Orléans Boulevard
- Osgoode Main Street
- Ottawa Road 29
- Ottawa Street (Richmond)
- Palladium Drive
- Panmure Road
- Parkdale Avenue
- Perth Street
- Pinecrest Road
- Preston Street
- Prince of Wales Drive
- Queen Elizabeth Driveway
- Queensway
- Ramsayville Road
- Richmond Road
- Rideau Street
- Rideau Valley Drive
- River Road
- Riverside Drive
- Robertson Road
- Rockdale Road
- Roger Stevens Drive
- Russland Road
- Russell Road
- Saumure Road
- Sir George-Étienne Cartier Parkway
- St. Joseph Boulevard
- St. Laurent Boulevard
- St. Patrick Street
- Scott Street
- Slater Street
- Smith Road
- Smyth Road
- Snake Island Road
- Somerset Street
- Sparks Street
- Stagecoach Road
- Strandherd Drive
- Sussex Drive
- Tenth Line Road
- Terry Fox Drive
- Timm Drive
- Thomas A. Dolan Parkway
- Thomas Argue Road
- Trail Road
- Trim Road
- Vanier Parkway
- Veterans Memorial Highway (416)
- Victoria Street
- Walkley Road
- Waller Street
- Wellington Street
- Woodroffe Avenue

== See also ==
- List of numbered roads in Ottawa
- List of Gatineau roads
- Capital Pathway
