= List of numbered roads in Ottawa =

List of numbered municipal roads

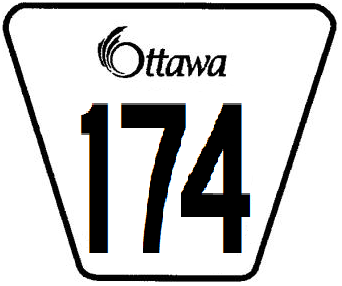
Ottawa Road 174 Shield

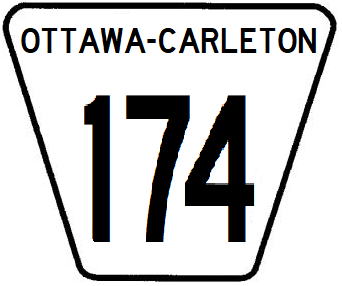
Ottawa-Carleton Regional Road 174 Shield

The city of Ottawa, Ontario, Canada maintains many regional roads, like most counties and regional municipalities in Southern and Eastern Ontario. The regional road system was created by the Regional Municipality of Ottawa-Carleton (RMOC) and managed by the RMOC until 2001. In 2001, when all six cities, four townships, and one village within the former RMOC amalgamated to form the new city of Ottawa, responsibility of the regional road system was transferred to the new city of Ottawa, and they became today's “Ottawa roads”.

In general, even-numbered routes run east-west and odd-numbered routes run north-south. Also, the lowest-numbered routes are generally found in the southern part of the city for even (east-west) numbered routes, and in the western part for odd (north-south) numbered routes. This pattern, however, has many exceptions. As more roads were added to the numbered-road system, the availability of numbers decreased and consequently, the numbering pattern had to be broken.

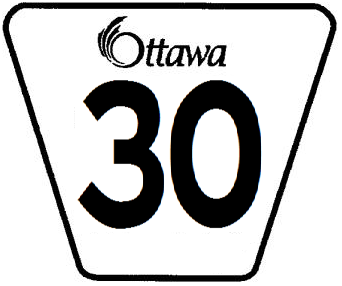
Ottawa Road 30 Shield

In smaller communities and rural areas the numbered roads are, for the most part, adequately signed with trapezoid-shaped signs with rounded corners, which are often referred to as "flowerpots" due to the shape of the sign. Older signs installed prior to 2001 have the legend "Ottawa-Carleton" at the top with the route number underneath. Newer signs installed after 2001 use the legend "Ottawa" or simply the "O" portion of the city's wordmark. Most numbered-road signs are not marked with directional tabs indicating the direction of the road (i.e. North, South, East, West), but where these appear, they are always printed in both English and French.

Most numbered roads in the urban areas of Ottawa are not signed with route numbers, despite having official route numbers and being listed on many maps with these numbers. Ottawa's city council adopted an updated route-numbering policy in 2005, under which road numbers are no longer posted inside the Greenbelt except for significant roads such as Ottawa Road 174, a former provincial highway, which is now usually known as "The 174". This effectively makes most Ottawa Roads within the greenbelt useful only for the City's internal purposes, not for wayfinding, as they are not signed. This is especially the case for Ottawa Roads 70, 78, 82, 105, and 113 which have little to no public record, due to the fact that they were likely numbered after numbering was discontinued in the downtown core.

During the mass downloading of Ontario's provincial highways onto regional authorities in 1997 and 1998, the former Regional Municipality of Ottawa-Carleton was given responsibility over former Highways 16, 31, 44, the section of 17 east of Highway 417 and the section of 15 downloaded to the Region. These former highways became known as Regional Roads (subsequently Ottawa Roads) 73, 31, 49, 174 and 29, respectively.

== List ==
Number	Names	Western/Southern Terminus	Eastern/Northern Terminus	Major Communities	Geographical Township / Region	Notes
Ottawa Road 2	Donnelly Drive	Ottawa/Lanark County Border	Ottawa Road 5 (Donnelly Drive [north], Merlyn Wilson Road [south])	Burritts Rapids	Marlborough	Continues west as Lanark County Road 2.
Ottawa Road 3	Dwyer Hill Road, Upper Dwyer Hill Road	Ottawa Road 2 (Donnelly Drive)	Ottawa Road 22 (Galetta Side Road)	Burritts Rapids, Dwyer Hill, Panmure	Marlborough, Goulbourn, Huntley, Fitzroy	
Ottawa Road 4	Dalmeny Road, Marvelville Road	Ottawa Road 19 (River Road)	Ottawa Road 41 (Gregoire Road)	Dalmeny, Marvelville	Osgoode	Originally continued west along Gordon Murdock Road, Osgoode Main Street, Nixon Drive, and Roger Stevens Drive to the Ottawa/Lanark County Border and didn't include the portion of Dalmeny Road west of Gordon Murdock Road. The current routing was established around 1982, with the Roger Stevens Drive portion (and part of Nixon Drive) being replaced by Ottawa-Carleton Regional Road 6 (now Ottawa Road 6) and the portion from Ottawa Road 6 (Snake Island Road) to Dalmeny Road being removed from the network. Osgoode Main Street would become Ottawa-Carleton Regional Road 114 (now Ottawa Road 114) around 1992. Ottawa Road 4 would only be extended easterly to Ottawa Road 41 when it was created (previously ending at Regional Road 29 (Yorks Corners Rd)).
Ottawa Road 5	Merlyn Wilson Road, Donnelly Drive, Fourth Line Road, Century Road West, McBean Street, Perth Street, Huntley Road, Stittsville Main Street, Carp Road, Galetta Side Road, Harbour Road, Fitzroy Road, Canon Smith Road, Aylwin Road	Ottawa/Leeds & Grenville United Counties Border (Rideau River)	Ottawa Road 7 (Ferry Road)	North Gower, Richmond, Stittsville, Carp, Fitzroy Harbour	Marlborough, North Gower, Goulbourn, Huntley, Fitzroy	Continues south as Leeds & Grenville United Counties Road 44. Formerly ran along Malakoff Road and Roger Stevens Drive between Becketts Landing and North Gower. Around 1982, the portion south of North Gower was removed. The current routing was established around 1998.
Ottawa Road 5A	Stittsville Main Street	Ottawa Road 5 (Carp Road)	Ottawa Road 36 (Hazeldean Road)	Stittsville	Goulbourn	Not signed.
Ottawa Road 6	Roger Stevens Drive, Nixon Drive, Snake Island Road, Victoria Street	Ottawa/Lanark County Border	Ottawa Road 41 (Gregoire Road (south), Boundary Road (north)) / Ottawa/Prescott & Russell United Counties Border	Malakoff, North Gower, Kars, Metcalfe	Marlborough, North Gower, Osgoode	Continues west as Lanark County Road 4 and east as Prescott & Russell United Counties Road 3. Originally ended at Nixon Drive in the west, while the current route west of this point was part of Ottawa-Carleton Regional Road 4 (now Ottawa Road 4). The current routing was established around 1982.
Ottawa Road 6A	Cartwright Road	Ottawa Road 6 (Victoria Street)	Ottawa Road 41 (Boundary Road)		Osgoode	
Ottawa Road 7	Ferry Road	Ottawa Road 22 (Galetta Side Road)	Toll ferry to Quyon, Quebec		Fitzroy	
Ottawa Road 8	Brophy Drive, Bankfield Road, Manotick Main Street, Bridge Street, Mitch Owens Road, Boundary Road, Devine Road, Rockdale Road, Russland Road, Saumure Road	Ottawa Road 49 (Eagleson Road)	Ottawa Road 37 (Saumure Road) / Ottawa/Prescott & Russell United Counties Border	Manotick, Manotick Station, Greely, South Gloucester, Edwards, Vars	Nepean, North Gower, Osgoode, Gloucester, Cumberland	Originally ended at Vars in the east
Ottawa Road 9	Dunrobin Road	Ottawa Road 49 (March Road)	Ottawa Road 22 (Galetta Side Road)	Dunrobin, Malwood	March, Torbolton	
Ottawa Road 10	Franktown Road, Perth Street	[[Ottawa| County Road 10]] at the Ottawa/Lanark County Border	Road 49 (Eagleson Road)	Richmond	Goulbourn	Continues west as Lanark County Road 10. Ottawa Road 10 originally followed Old Richmond Road and Moodie Drive up to Carling Avenue. The portion south of Ottawa Road 86 (Hope Side Road) has been replaced by Ottawa Road 59 since around 1984. The portion between Ottawa Road 86 (Hope Side Road) and Ottawa Road 12 (Fallowfield Road) was replaced by Ottawa Road 59 around 1998. Ottawa Road 10 was shortened to end at Ottawa Road 49 (Eagleson Road) at the same time.
Ottawa Road 11	Moodie Drive	Ottawa Road 8 (Brophy Drive)	Ottawa Road 32 (West Hunt Club Road)		Nepean	Originally continued north to Regional Road 10 (Richmond Road, now Ottawa Road 59 (Old Richmond Road)).
Ottawa Road 12	Fallowfield Road	Ottawa Road 3 (Dwyer Hill Road)	Ottawa Road 73 (Prince of Wales Drive)	Fallowfield, Barrhaven	Goulbourn, Nepean	Originally ran along Flewellyn Road west of Ottawa-Carleton Regional Road 5 (Huntley Road, now Ottawa Road 5) to Ashton and the Ottawa/Lanark County border. The current routing was established in around 1992.
Ottawa Road 13	Dilworth Road, Rideau Valley Drive South, Roger Stevens Drive, Rideau Valley Drive North, Manotick Main Street, Rideau Valley Drive, Longfields Drive, Jockvale Road, Greenbank Road, Pinecrest Road	Ottawa Road 5 (Fourth Line Road)	Ottawa Road 38 (Carling Avenue)	Nepean, Barrhaven, Manotick, Kars	North Gower, Nepean	Formerly continued along the current Ottawa Road 5 path to Grenville County, until Highway 16 was downloaded to the City of Ottawa in 1998.
Ottawa Road 14	Leitrim Road	Ottawa Road 19 (River Road)	Ottawa Road 26 (Russell Road)	Leitrim	Gloucester	
Ottawa Road 15	Woodroffe Avenue, Fairlawn Avenue, Lenester Avenue	Ottawa Road 73 (Prince of Wales Drive)	Kichi Zibi Mikan	Nepean, Barrhaven	Nepean	Intersection with Prince of Wales Drive has been closed. Fairlawn Avenue and Lenester Avenue from Carling Avenue to Woodroffe Avenue helps form a rectangle with Woodroffe Ave and Carling Avenue.
Ottawa Road 16	Holly Acres Road, Richmond Road, Baseline Road, Heron Road	Road 38 (Carling Avenue)	Ottawa Road 74 (Walkley Road)	Nepean, Ottawa	Nepean, Ottawa	
Ottawa Road 17	Merivale Road, Clyde Avenue, Maitland Avenue	Ottawa Road 73 (Prince of Wales Drive)	Ottawa Road 38 (Carling Avenue)	Nepean, Ottawa	Nepean	Originally continued north along Merivale Road past Clyde Avenue
Ottawa Road 19	River Road, Riverside Drive, Vanier Parkway	Ottawa/Leeds & Grenville United Counties Border	Ottawa Road 44 (Beechwood Avenue)	Manotick, Riverside South, Ottawa, Vanier	Osgoode, Gloucester, Ottawa	Continues south as Leeds & Grenville United Counties Road 19.
Ottawa Road 20	Kinburn Side Road	Ottawa/Lanark County Border	Ottawa Road 9 (Dunrobin Road)	Antrim, Kinburn, Woodlawn	Fitzroy, Torbolton	Continues west as Lanark County Road 20
Ottawa Road 21	Sixth Line Road, Torwood Drive	Ottawa Road 109 (Cameron Harvey Drive)	Ottawa Road 129 (Vances Side Road)		Torbolton	
Ottawa Road 22	Galetta Side Road	Ottawa Road 29	Ottawa Road 9 (Dunrobin Road)	Galetta, Dirleton	Fitzroy, Torbolton	Continues west as Lanark County Road 22.
Ottawa Road 23	Cedarview Road	Ottawa Road 12 (Fallowfield Road)	Ottawa Road 16 (Baseline Road)	Barrhaven, Nepean	Nepean	Formerly continued south of Ottawa Road 12
Ottawa Road 24	Lester Road	Road 25 (Albion Road)	Road 31 (Bank Street)	Gloucester	Gloucester	
Ottawa Road 25	Stagecoach Road, Mitch Owens Road, Albion Road	County Road 1 in Stormont, Dundas & Glengarry United Counties Border	Road 31 (Bank Street)	Reids Mills, West Osgoode, Enniskerry, Greely, Gloucester	Osgoode, Gloucester	Continues south as Stormont, Dundas & Glengarry United Counties Road 1. Originally ended at Ottawa-Carleton Regional Road 4 (Dalmeny Road, now Ottawa Road 4) in the north and was extended to Ottawa-Carleton Regional Road 8 (Mitch Owens Road, now Ottawa Road 8) around 1982.
Ottawa Road 26	St. Laurent Boulevard, Ramsayville Road, Russell Road	Road 44 (Hemlock Road)	Ottawa/Prescott & Russell United Counties Border	Rockcliffe Park, Vanier, Ottawa, Gloucester, Ramsayville, Carlsbad Springs, Bearbrook	Ottawa, Gloucester, Cumberland	Continues east as Prescott & Russell United Counties Road 2
Ottawa Road 27	8th Line Road, Anderson Road, Blair Road	Road 6 (Victoria Street)	Road 34 (Montreal Road)	Metcalfe, Gloucester	Osgoode, Gloucester	Used to be numbered north beyond Ottawa Road 34 to Blair Road's northern dead-end. Originally terminated at Ottawa-Carleton Regional Road 8 (Mitch Owens Road, now Ottawa Road 8) in the north. Formerly ran along some portions of Ogilvie Road to the Aviation Parkway.
Ottawa Road 28	Bearbrook Road, Innes Road, Blackburn Hamlet Bypass, Navan Road, Colonial Road	Road 34 (Montreal Road)	Ottawa/Prescott & Russell United Counties Border	Blackburn Hamlet, Orleans, Notre-Dame-des-Champs, Navan, Sarsfield	Gloucester, Cumberland	Continues on as Prescott & Russell United Counties Road 1 (du Golf Road). Concurrent with Ottawa Road 30 along Blackburn Hamlet Bypass. Innes Road and Blackburn Hamlet Bypass portions may no longer be numbered.
Ottawa Road 29	Ottawa Road 29	Ottawa/Lanark County Border	Road 117 (Madawaska Boulevard), Highway 17		Fitzroy	Continues south as Lanark County Road 29. Formerly part of Highway 15 (and before that, 29).
Ottawa Road 30	Industrial Avenue, Innes Road, Blackburn Hamlet Bypass	Ottawa Road 19 (Riverside Drive)	Ottawa Road 35 (Dunning Road)	Ottawa, Gloucester, Blackburn Hamlet, Orleans	Gloucester, Cumberland, Ottawa	Originally ran down Cyrville Road and passed through Blackburn along Innes Rd. Now bypasses the town via the Blackburn Hamlet Bypass.
Ottawa Road 31	Bank Street	Ottawa/Stormont, Dundas & Glengarry United Counties Border	Ottawa Road 34 (Wellington Street)	Vernon, Spring Hill, Greely, Leitrim, Ottawa	Gloucester, Osgoode, Ottawa	Continues south as Stormont, Dundas & Glengarry United Counties Road 31. Briefly known as Ottawa Road 85. Bank Street north of Heron Road was formerly Ottawa Road 85. Bank Street south of Heron Road was formerly Highway 31.
Ottawa Road 32	West Hunt Club Road, Hunt Club Road, Hawthorne Road	Ottawa Road 59 (Old Richmond Road)	Ottawa Road 26 (Russell Road) (Hawthorne Road) / Highway 417 (Hunt Club Road)	Nepean, Ottawa, Gloucester	Nepean, Gloucester	Splits into two at end (Hawthorne Road for access to Russell Road and Hunt Club Road for access to Highway 417). Numbered since around 1992. Replaced most of former Ottawa Road 52 (Knoxdale Road) around 1998 when the Hunt Club Road expansion was completed to Old Richmond Road.
Ottawa Road 33	Rockdale Road, Colonial Road, Frank Kenny Road	Ottawa/Prescott & Russell United Counties Border	Ottawa Road 30 (Innes Road)	Vars, Orleans	Cumberland	Continues south as Prescott & Russell United Counties Road 28 (St-Guillaume Road). Concurrent with Ottawa Road 28 along Colonial Road from Rockdale Road to Frank Kenny Road.
Ottawa Road 34	Wellington Street, Commissioner Street, Rideau Street, Montreal Road, St. Joseph Boulevard, Old Montreal Road	Ottawa Road 77 (Booth Street)	Ottawa Road 35 (Dunning Road)	Ottawa, Vanier, Gloucester, Orleans, Cumberland	Ottawa, Gloucester, Cumberland	Former route of Highway 17, also of Highway 17B west of Ottawa Road 174. Commissioner Street is Ottawa Road 34 only in extension (formerly part of Wellington Street).
Ottawa Road 35	Dunning Road, Old Montreal Road, Cameron Street	Ottawa Road 26 (Russell Road)	Ferry to Masson-Angers, Quebec	Bearbrook, Leonard, French Hill, Cumberland	Cumberland	The ferry connects to Chemin du Quai in Gatineau.
Ottawa Road 36	Hazeldean Road, Robertson Road, Richmond Road, Wellington Street West, Somerset Street West	Spruce Ridge Rd	Road 91 (Elgin Street)	Stittsville, Kanata, Bells Corners, Nepean, Ottawa	Goulbourn, Nepean, Ottawa	Not signed east of Ottawa Road 59 (Moodie Drive). Formerly Highways 7 and 15 approaching Ottawa from the west.
Ottawa Road 37	Saumure Road	Ottawa Road 8 (Saumure Road) [west], Indian Creek Road [east]	Ottawa Road 26 (Russell Road)		Cumberland	
Ottawa Road 38	Carling Avenue	Ottawa Road 49 (March Road)	Ottawa Road 79 (Bronson Avenue)	Kanata, Nepean, Ottawa	March, Kanata, Nepean, Ottawa	The section from Ottawa Road 36 (Richmond Road) to Ottawa Road 79 (Bronson Avenue) was part of Highway 17B prior to 1998.
Ottawa Road 39	Champlain Street	Ottawa Road 34 (St. Joseph Boulevard)	Ottawa Road 174 (Regional Road 174)	Orleans	Orleans	Intersection with Ottawa Rd 34 no longer exists. Road ends in Place d'Orleans Shopping Centre. Originally continued north to Champlain Street dead-end.
Ottawa Road 40	Scott Street, Albert Street, Slater Street	Ottawa Road 65 (Churchill Avenue North)	Ottawa Road 91 (Elgin Street)	Ottawa	Ottawa	One way eastbound.
Ottawa Road 41	Gregoire Road, Boundary Road, Mer Bleue Road	Marionville Road (south section); Ottawa Road 28 (Navan Road) (north section)	Ottawa Road 26 (Russell Road) (south section); Ottawa Road 30 (Innes Road) (north section)	Orleans, Cumberland	Cumberland	Boundary Road forms the boundary between the City of Ottawa and Prescott & Russell United Counties. Two sections, separated by the Mer Bleue Conservation Area. Only extended south to Marionville around 1992, from Ottawa Road 6 (Victoria St).
Ottawa Road 42	Albert Street	Slater Street	Ottawa Road 91 (Elgin Street)	Ottawa	Ottawa	One way westbound
Ottawa Road 43	Ramsayville Road	Ottawa Road 8 (Mitch Owens Road)	Ottawa Road 74 (Walkley Road)	Gloucester, Osgoode	Gloucester, Osgoode	
Ottawa Road 44	St. Patrick Street, Beechwood Avenue, Hemlock Road	Alexandra Bridge	Ottawa Road 26 (St. Laurent Boulevard)	Ottawa, Vanier, Rockcliffe Park	Ottawa	May have included Murray Street from King Edward Avenue to Alexandra Bridge in the past.
Ottawa Road 45	Munster Road	Ottawa Road 10 (Franktown Road)	Ottawa Road 12 (Fallowfield Road)	Munster, Goulbourn	Goulbourn	Originally continued north to Flewellyn Road while it was designated Ottawa-Carleton Regional Road 12 (now Ottawa Road 12). When this designation was changed to Fallowfield Road, Ottawa Road 45 was modified accordingly.
Ottawa Road 46	Thomas A. Dolan Parkway	Ottawa Road 5 (Carp Road)	Ottawa Road 9 (Dunrobin Road)	Dunrobin, Huntley, March	Huntley. March	
Ottawa Road 47	Tenth Line Road	Ottawa Road 28 (Navan Road)	Jeanne d'Arc Boulevard North	Burromee, Orleans, Cumberland	Cumberland	
Ottawa Road 47A	Old Tenth Line Road	Ottawa Road 47 (Tenth Line Road)	Ottawa Road 34 (St. Joseph Boulevard)	Orleans	Orleans	In 1993, a small portion of Tenth Line Road was realigned near St. Joseph Boulevard. The re-alignment was placed slightly to the west. The old portion was kept and renamed Old Tenth Line Road which connects to a Highway 174 exit ramp.
Ottawa Road 48	Laurier Avenue West, Laurier Avenue East, Charlotte Street	Ottawa Road 79 (Bronson Avenue)	Ottawa Road 34 (Rideau Street)	Ottawa	Ottawa	
Ottawa Road 49	Eagleson Road, March Road	Ottawa Road 8 (Brophy Drive)	Ottawa/Lanark County Border	Richmond, Kanata, South March, Westwood, Carp, Corkery, March	Goulbourn, Huntley, March, Kanata	Continues west as Lanark County Road 49. Was Highway 44 prior to April 1, 1997 from then-Highway 17 to Ottawa/Lanark County border. March Road intersects Highway 417 at two separate interchanges. Ottawa Road 49 used to only include a portion from Ottawa Road 12 (Fallowfield Road) to Kanata. It was extended to include March Road to then-Highway 17 and south to Ottawa Road 8 (Brophy Drive) around 1984.
Ottawa Road 50	Coventry Road, Ogilvie Road	Ottawa Road 19 (Vanier Parkway)	Ottawa Road 34 (Montreal Road)	Ottawa, Gloucester	Gloucester, Ottawa	Possibly formerly partially part of Ottawa Road 27
Ottawa Road 51	Meadowlands Drive West, Meadowlands Drive East, Hog's Back Road, Brookfield Road	Ottawa Road 15 (Woodroffe Avenue)	Ottawa Road 79 (Airport Parkway)	Nepean, Ottawa	Nepean, Ottawa	An east–west road with an odd number, against the convention.
Ottawa Road 54	Trail Road	Ottawa Road 11 (Moodie Drive)	Barnsdale Road	Nepean	Nepean	
Ottawa Road 55	Jeanne d'Arc Boulevard South	Ottawa Road 30 (Innes Road)	Ottawa Road 174	Orleans	Orleans	
Ottawa Road 56	Orléans Boulevard	Ottawa Road 30 (Innes Road)	Ottawa Road 34 (St. Joseph Boulevard)	Orleans	Orleans	A mostly north-south road with an even number, against the convention
Ottawa Road 57	Trim Road	Ottawa Road 30 (Innes Road)	Ottawa Road 174	Orleans	Orleans	Formerly Ottawa-Carleton Regional Road 31. This was changed around 1982
Ottawa Road 59	Old Richmond Road, Moodie Drive	Ottawa Road 12 (Fallowfield Road)	Ottawa Road 38 (Carling Avenue)	Bells Corners, Fallowfield, Nepean	Nepean	
Ottawa Road 60	Catherine Street	Ottawa Road 79 (Bronson Avenue)	Ottawa Road 91 (Elgin Street)	Ottawa	Ottawa	One way westbound. The section from Ottawa Road 79 (Bronson Avenue) to Ottawa Road 87 (O'Connor Street) was part of Highway 17B prior to 1998
Ottawa Road 61	Terry Fox Drive	Ottawa Road 36 (Hazeldean Road)	Campeau Drive	Kanata	Kanata	
Ottawa Road 62	Imperial Avenue, Chamberlain Avenue, Isabella Street	Ottawa Road 79 (Bronson Avenue)	Ottawa Road 91 (Elgin Street)	Ottawa	Ottawa	One way eastbound. The section from Ottawa Road 79 (Bronson Avenue) to Ottawa Road 83 (Kent Street) was part of Highway 17B prior to 1998
Ottawa Road 63	Merivale Road	Ottawa Road 17 (Clyde Avenue)	Ottawa Road 38 (Carling Avenue)	Nepean, Ottawa	Nepean, Ottawa	Merivale Road south of Clyde Avenue is part of Ottawa Road 17
Ottawa Road 64	Greenfield Avenue, Mann Avenue	Ottawa Road 72 (Main Street)	Chapel Street	Ottawa	Ottawa	
Ottawa Road 65	Churchill Avenue North	Ottawa Road 36 (Richmond Road)	Scott Street	Ottawa	Ottawa	
Ottawa Road 66	Lees Avenue	Ottawa Road 72 (Main Street)	Chapel Crescent	Ottawa	Ottawa	
Ottawa Road 67	Kirkwood Avenue	Ottawa Road 63 (Merivale Road)	Ottawa Road 36 (Richmond Road)	Ottawa	Ottawa	
Ottawa Road 68	North River Road, McArthur Avenue	Ottawa Road 34 (Montreal Road)	Ottawa Road 26 (St. Laurent Boulevard)	Vanier, Ottawa	Ottawa	
Ottawa Road 69	Fisher Avenue, Holland Avenue	Ottawa Road 73 (Prince of Wales Drive)	Scott Street	Nepean, Ottawa	Nepean, Ottawa	
Ottawa Road 70	Besserer Street	Ottawa Road 95 (Nicholas Street)	Cumberland Street	Ottawa	Ottawa	
Ottawa Road 71	Parkdale Avenue	Ottawa Road 38 (Carling Avenue)	Kichi Zibi Mikan	Ottawa	Ottawa	
Ottawa Road 72	Main Street, Smyth Road	Colonel By Drive	Ottawa Road 26 (St. Laurent Boulevard)	Ottawa	Ottawa	
Ottawa Road 73	Prince of Wales Drive, Preston Street	Ottawa Road 5 (Fourth Line Road)	Albert Street	North Gower, Manotick, Ottawa, Nepean	North Gower, Nepean, Ottawa	Much of this route was part of Highway 16 (originally the "Prescott Highway") prior to 1998
Ottawa Road 74	Walkley Road	Ottawa Road 19 (Riverside Drive)	Ottawa Road 43 (Ramsayville Road)	Ottawa, Gloucester	Gloucester, Ottawa	
Ottawa Road 75	Rochester Street	Ottawa Road 38 (Carling Avenue)	Gladstone Avenue	Ottawa	Ottawa	
Ottawa Road 76	Commissioner Street	Ottawa Road 34 (Former route of Wellington Street (now an extension of Commissioner Street, near where Queen St would meet Commissioner if extended))	Ottawa Road 42 (Albert Street)	Ottawa	Ottawa	Formerly continued to intersection of Bronson Avenue and Slater Street.
Ottawa Road 77	Booth Street, Chaudière Crossing	Albert Street	Ontario/Quebec Border	Ottawa	Ottawa	
Ottawa Road 78	Boteler Street	Ottawa Road 93 (Sussex Drive)	Dalhousie St	Ottawa	Ottawa	
Ottawa Road 79	Airport Parkway, Bronson Avenue	Macdonald-Cartier International Airport	Ottawa Road 42 (Albert Street)	Ottawa	Ottawa	Airport Parkway is a controlled access Super two freeway that is scheduled to be upgraded to a four lane freeway from Brookfield Road to Ottawa Road 32 (Hunt Club Road). Used to split into two one-way streets at the north end (Commissioner Street (Southbound), Bronson Avenue (Northbound)).
Ottawa Road 80	Bayview Station Road, Bayswater Avenue	Scott Street	Ottawa Road 36 (Somerset Street West)	Ottawa	Ottawa	
Ottawa Road 81	Lyon Street North	Ottawa Road 60 (Catherine Street)	Ottawa Road 34 (Wellington Street)	Ottawa	Ottawa	One way southbound
Ottawa Road 82	Murray Street	Alexandra Bridge	Ottawa Road 99 (King Edward Avenue)	Ottawa	Ottawa	Mistakenly shown as Ottawa Road 44 on many maps
Ottawa Road 83	Kent Street	Ottawa Road 62 (Chamberlain Avenue)	Ottawa Road 34 (Wellington Street)	Ottawa	Ottawa	One way northbound. Was part of Highway 17B prior to 1998.
Ottawa Road 84	Place d'Orléans Drive	Ottawa Road 34 (St. Joseph Boulevard)	Ottawa Road 34 (St. Joseph Boulevard)	Orleans	Orleans	Crescent serving Place d'Orléans.
Ottawa Road 85	Milton Road	Ottawa Road 26 (Russell Road)	Ottawa Road 28 (Navan Road)	Cumberland	Cumberland	Some maps mislabel Bank Street as Ottawa Road 85, a former designation of Bank north of Heron Road that was briefly extended to all of Bank after the downloading of Highway 31, around 1998. Ottawa Road 85 was formerly Ottawa Road 31.
Ottawa Road 86	Hope Side Road	Ottawa Road 49 (Eagleson Road)	Ottawa Road 59 (Old Richmond Road)	Kanata	Kanata	
Ottawa Road 87	O'Connor Street	Ottawa Road 62 (Isabella Street)	Ottawa Road 34 (Wellington Street)	Ottawa	Ottawa	One way southbound. Was part of Highway 17B prior to 1998.
Ottawa Road 88	Huntmar Drive, Campeau Drive, Palladium Drive	Ottawa Road 88 (Palladium Drive)	Ottawa Road 61 (Terry Fox Drive)	Kanata	Kanata	Western section is a loop.
Ottawa Road 89	Metcalfe Street	Ottawa Road 62 (Isabella Street)	Ottawa Road 34 (Wellington Street)	Ottawa	Ottawa	One way northbound.
Ottawa Road 91	Hawthorne Avenue, Elgin Street	Ottawa Road 72 (Main Street)	Ottawa Road 34 (Wellington Street)	Ottawa	Ottawa	
Ottawa Road 93	Colonel By Drive, Mackenzie Avenue, Sussex Drive, Princess Avenue	Daly Avenue	Sir George-Étienne Cartier Parkway	Ottawa, Rockliffe Park	Ottawa	Mackenzie Avenue is only Ottawa Road 93 from Colonel By Drive to Ottawa Road 34 (Rideau Street).
Ottawa Road 95	Nicholas Street	Mann Avenue	Ottawa Road 34 (Rideau Street)	Ottawa	Ottawa	The section north of Laurier Avenue is one way southbound.
Ottawa Road 97	Waller Street	Mackenzie King Bridge	Ottawa Road 34 (Rideau Street)	Ottawa	Ottawa	
Ottawa Road 99	Lees Avenue, King Edward Avenue	Chapel Crescent	Sussex Drive	Ottawa	Ottawa	
Ottawa Road 103	Alta Vista Drive	Ottawa Road 72 (Smyth Road)	Ottawa Road 30 (Industrial Avenue)	Ottawa	Ottawa	
Ottawa Road 105						Listed in official City of Ottawa registers, but its location is unknown.
Ottawa Road 107	Uplands Drive	Road 79 (Airport Parkway)	Road 32 (Hunt Club Drive)	Gloucester	Gloucester	
Ottawa Road 109	Cameron Harvey Drive	Road 9 (Dunrobin Road)	Road 21 (Sixth Line Road)	March	March	Formerly Riddell Drive.
Ottawa Road 111	Data Centre Road	Ottawa Road 16 (Heron Road)	Ottawa Road 19 (Riverside Drive)	Ottawa	Ottawa	Shares its number with one local bus route that runs along the southern portion of the route.
Ottawa Road 113	Mackenzie Avenue	Ottawa Road 34 (Rideau Street)	Ottawa Road 93 (Sussex Drive) / Ottawa Road 44 (St Patrick Street)	Ottawa	Ottawa	Mistakenly shown as part of Ottawa Road 93 on many maps.
Ottawa Road 114	Osgoode Main Street	Ottawa Road 19 (River Road)	Ottawa Road 25 (Stagecoach Road)	Osgoode	Osgoode	
Ottawa Road 117	Madawaska Boulevard	Road 29 [[Highway 17 (Ontario)| Highway 17]]	County Road 1 to Arnprior	Fitzroy	Fitzroy	Was part of Highway 17 prior to construction of Highway 417 bypass. A section from here south through Antrim almost to Grants Side Road is still officially part of Highway 17. Continues north as Renfrew County Road 1. Created by the downloading of Highway 7203 in 1998.
Ottawa Road 125	Conroy Road	Ottawa Road 31 (Bank Street)	Ottawa Road 74 (Walkley Road)	Gloucester, Ottawa	Gloucester, Ottawa	
Ottawa Road 128	Cyrville Road	Ottawa Road 26 (St. Laurent Boulevard)	Ottawa Road 30 (Innes Road)	Gloucester	Gloucester	Originally, Ottawa Road 128 was Innes Road west of Cyrville, while Ottawa Road 30 followed Cyrville. Used to run down Innes Road and Blackburn Hamlet Bypass to Innes Road.
Ottawa Road 129	Vances Side Road	Ottawa Road 9 (Dunrobin Road)	Ottawa Road 21 (Torwood Road)		Torbolton	An east-west road with an odd number, against the convention.
Ottawa Road 174	Queensway, Ottawa Road 174, "Highway 174", or simply "The 174"	Highway 417	Ottawa/Prescott & Russell United Counties Border	Orleans, Cumberland, Gloucester	Gloucester, Cumberland	Was Highway 17 prior to January 1, 1998. The Queensway name dates to the 1950s, before the construction of Highway 417, when this was part of the original freeway. Ottawa's highest numbered road and only municipally maintained controlled access freeway. Continues east as Prescott & Russell United Counties Road 17.

== Former Numbered Roads ==
Number	Names	Western/Southern Terminus	Eastern/Northern Terminus	Major Communities	Geographic Township / Region	Notes
17A	Clyde Avenue	Ottawa Road 17 (Merivale Road)	Ottawa Road 16 (Baseline Road)	Nepean	Nepean	Subsumed by Ottawa Road 17.
18	Corkstown Road	Ottawa Road 49 (March Road)	Ottawa Road 59 (Moodie Drive)	Nepean	March, Nepean	Numbered from around 1992 to shortly after amalgamation.
29	Yorks Corners Road	Ottawa Road 4 (Marvelville Road)	Ottawa Road 8 (Mitch Owens Road)	Kenmore, Edwards	Osgoode	Ottawa Road 29 has been reused
31	Trim Road	Ottawa Road 30 (Innes Road)	Ottawa Road 174	Orleans	Orleans	Changed to Ottawa Road 57 around 1982. Ottawa Road 31 was reused for Milton Road (now Ottawa Road 85) and now for Bank Street (formerly Ottawa Road 85).
31	Milton Road	Ottawa Road 26 (Russell Road)	Ottawa Road 28 (Navan Road)	Cumberland	Cumberland	Changed to Ottawa Road 85 around 1998. Ottawa Road 31 designation was moved to Bank Street (formerly Ottawa Road 85).
52	Knoxdale Road	Ottawa Road 32 (West Hunt Club Road)	Ottawa Road 15 (Woodroffe Avenue)	Nepean	Nepean	Used to continue west to Old Richmond Road before West Hunt Club Road replaced most of Knoxdale Road. Mostly replaced by Ottawa Road 32 around 1998. Numbering ended in the 2010s.
53	MacFarlane Road	Ottawa Road 17 (Merivale Road)	Ottawa Road 73 (Prince of Wales Drive)	Nepean	Nepean	
85	Bank Street	Ottawa Road 16 (Heron Road)	Ottawa Road 34 (Wellington Street)	Ottawa	Ottawa	Briefly extended to all of Bank Street (extending the southern terminus to Ottawa/Stormont Dundas and Glengarry United Counties border) after the downloading of Highway 31, around 1998.
118	Ottawa Road 118	Ottawa/Lanark County Border	Ottawa Road 117 (Madawaska Boulevard)		Fitzroy	Created after the downloading of Highway 7203 and Highway 15 to the Region of Ottawa-Carleton and Renfrew County. Quickly mostly subsumed by Ottawa Road 29 within the City of Ottawa.
202						Walkley Road area, appears on maps around 1995.
220	Carling Avenue	Ottawa Road 49 (March Road)		Kanata, Nepean	Kanata, Nepean, March Township	Subsumed by Ottawa Road 38.
248	Hazeldean Road, Robertson Road	Highway 7	Ottawa Road 16 (Baseline Road)	Bells Corners	Nepean	Subsumed by Ottawa Road 36. Temporary routing also existed along Castlefrank Road.

== General Patterns ==
=== Even-numbered roads (East-West Direction) ===
Southernmost	Northernmost	Region	Notes
Ottawa Road 2	Ottawa Road 22	Whole City (Rideau River in the South to Ottawa River in the North)	
Ottawa Road 24	Ottawa Road 34	Gloucester / Cumberland	Ottawa Road 32 does not follow this pattern, likely due to its construction which was much later than the other roads.
Ottawa Road 74	Ottawa Road 60	Ottawa / Gloucester	

=== Odd-numbered roads (North-South Direction) ===
Westernmost	Easternmost	Region	Notes
Ottawa Road 3	Ottawa Road 19	West Ottawa	
Ottawa Road 21	Ottawa Road 37	Whole City (Torbolton in the West to Cumberland in the East)	Ottawa Road 29 and 31 do not follow this pattern as they are numbered based on highway downloading. Ottawa Road 31 was formerly Milton Road (present-day Ottawa Road 85) and followed this pattern. Ottawa Road 31 and Ottawa Road 85 switched shortly after Highway 31 was downloaded to the Region of Ottawa-Carleton.
Ottawa Road 65	Ottawa Road 99	Old Ottawa	Ottawa Road 85 was formerly Bank St (present-day Ottawa Road 31) and followed this pattern. Ottawa Road 31 and Ottawa Road 85 switched shortly after Highway 31 was downloaded to the Region of Ottawa-Carleton.

== See also ==
- List of roads in Ottawa
- List of Ontario county numbered roads
- GeoOttawa (City of Ottawa's mapping software; only shows road numbers in rural areas)
- Official road map of Ontario (shows most major numbered roads in Ontario)
- Map of Ottawa (2007) (Displays most numbered roads as of 2007)
- City of Ottawa Official Plan Maps (Display most numbered roads)
- Ottawa-Carleton Regional Roads Report
