= Albion Road (Ottawa) =

Road in Ottawa, Canada

- Ottawa Road 25 (unsigned)
- Map of Albion Road Albion Road Albion Road North
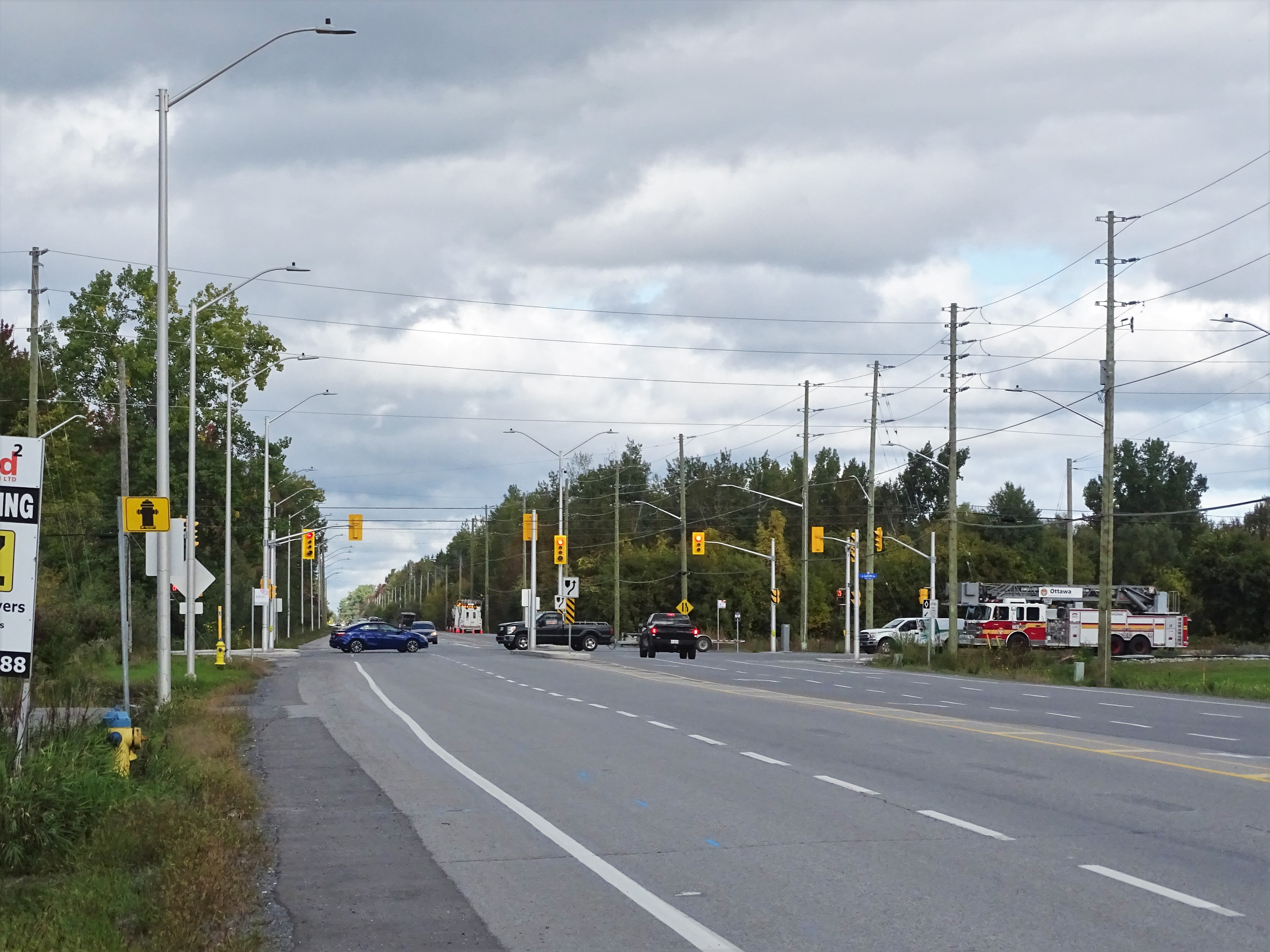
- Albion Road looking north at Leitrim Road

Route information
- Maintained by City of Ottawa
- Length: 12 km (7.5 mi)

Major junctions
- South end: Mitch Owens Road
- North end: Walkley Road

Location
- Country: Canada
- Province: Ontario
- Major cities: Ottawa

Highway system
- Roads in Ontario

Albion Road is an important north–south road in the southern part of Ottawa, Ontario, Canada. The street begins in the north as Albion Road North, at Walkley Road. It is internally designated as Ottawa Road 25, as part of the now-mostly unsigned Ottawa Roads system; a legacy of the former Ottawa-Carleton regional roads system.

It runs only a short distance as a local road before being interrupted by the railway tracks and the Walkley O-Train garage servicing Line 2. South of the rail lines Albion Road proper begins. At first a small street running through a residential area, it becomes briefly an arterial road at Hunt Club Road and Bank Street before passing through the Blossom Park Community.

South of Lester, it continues to run south, into the rural areas of Ottawa, as a minor arterial road, and it also forms the eastern boundary of Macdonald–Cartier International Airport. Albion Road continues through the rural part of Ottawa, ending at Mitch Owens Road, just northwest of Greely, Ontario.

== Lester Road detour controversy ==
In December 2002, City Council voted in favour of prohibiting motorists going northbound or southbound on Albion to continue past the intersection of Lester Road with the exception of emergency vehicles, bicycles and OC Transpo buses, although only a rush-hour route travels through that intersection. Residents of Blossom Park between Lester and Bank Street cited safety concerns as Albion was a residential artery and that speeding and heavy traffic became issues in the neighbourhood.

Motorists have been detoured to Bank Street to the east or the Airport Parkway to the west via Lester. Residents from the rural south later expressed concern about the detour citing also safety reasons along Lester as many motorists were doing U-turns to skip the detours. Motorists also cited the detour as an inconvenience to access other areas of the city. A bypass around the community at Albion Road has been proposed that would realign Albion from Lester to Hunt Club Road just west of the Airport Parkway but the project was not planned in the city's Transportation Master Plan other than widening Albion south of Lester which itself was planned to be widened to the Airport Parkway which itself is proposed to be widened to Heron Road.

After a failed attempt in 2004, Osgoode Ward Councillor Doug Thompson, who was a strong opponent of the closure, later re-lived the debate in 2007. In September, a community meeting of proponents to the reopening of the intersection was held that led to more controversy as it was abruptly ended when Gloucester-Southgate Ward Councilor Diane Deans started her own debate within the meeting arguing for the closure of the road and had proposed several compromises including the extension of Earl Armstrong Road towards Bank Street. In October 2007, the Transportation Committee voted 5–3 against Thompson's motion but Council reversed the decision 12–10. A new vote requested by Councillor Deans failed on November 14, 2007, and the intersection was officially re-opened on November 28, 2007.

According to A-Channel, Deans also criticized Baseline Ward Councillor Rick Chiarelli for changing his vote in favour of the re-opening due to pressures from Mayor Larry O'Brien's office citing possible impacts on a project in his ward, but Chiarelli replied that both sides were pressured for the vote. Council had also approved some measures to slow down traffic in Blossom Park and to improve pedestrian crossing with the addition of three-way stops between Lester and Bank.
