= Dwyer Hill =

Dwyer Hill may refer to several different things, including:

- Dwyer Hill, Ontario, a rural community southwest of the city of Ottawa.
- Dwyer Hill Road (Ottawa), a road.
