= Regional road =

The term regional road (or route) is used in a number of places to designate roads of more than purely local but less than national strategic importance in a country's highway network.

It is used formally and officially in reference to:

- Regional road (Ireland)
- Regional road (Italy)
- Regional road (Ontario)
- Regional route (South Africa)

== See also ==
- List of numbered roads in York Region (Canada)
- Transport in Senegal
