= Ontario Highway 31 =

Road in Ontario, Canada

Highway 31
- A map of Highway 31, in red (as of March 31, 1997)

Route information
- Maintained by Ministry of Transportation of Ontario
- Length: 76.93 km (47.80 mi)
- Existed: July 2, 1927 – January 1, 1998

Major junctions
- South end: Highway 2 in Morrisburg
- Highway 401; Highway 43 in Winchester; Highway 16 in Ottawa; Highway 417 (Queensway) in Ottawa
- North end: Chaudière Bridge at the Quebec boundary in Ottawa

Location
- Country: Canada
- Province: Ontario
- Counties: Stormont, Dundas and Glengarry
- Regions: Ottawa–Carleton
- Major cities: Ottawa
- Towns: Morrisburg, Winchester

Highway system
- Ontario provincial highways; Current; Former; 400-series
← Highway 28	→ Highway 33
Former provincial highways
← Highway 30	Highway 32 →

King's Highway 31, commonly referred to as Highway 31 and historically known as the Metcalfe Road, was a provincially maintained highway in the Canadian province of Ontario. The 76.93-kilometre (47.80 mi) route connected Highway 2 in Morrisburg with the Chaudière Bridge at the Ontario–Quebec boundary in downtown Ottawa.

Established in 1927, Highway 31 originally extended from Highway 2 north to the Stormont, Dundas and Glengarry – Carleton county line. It was extended into Ottawa in 1936, and had several routings through the city over the years. The southern terminus was altered with the construction of the St. Lawrence Seaway in 1958, and a bypass of Winchester was opened in 1974. The entire highway was decommissioned in 1997 and 1998, and transferred to lower levels of government. It has since been known as Stormont, Dundas and Glengarry (SDG) County Road 31 outside of Ottawa, and Ottawa Road 31 and several local names within Ottawa, notably Bank Street.

== Route description ==
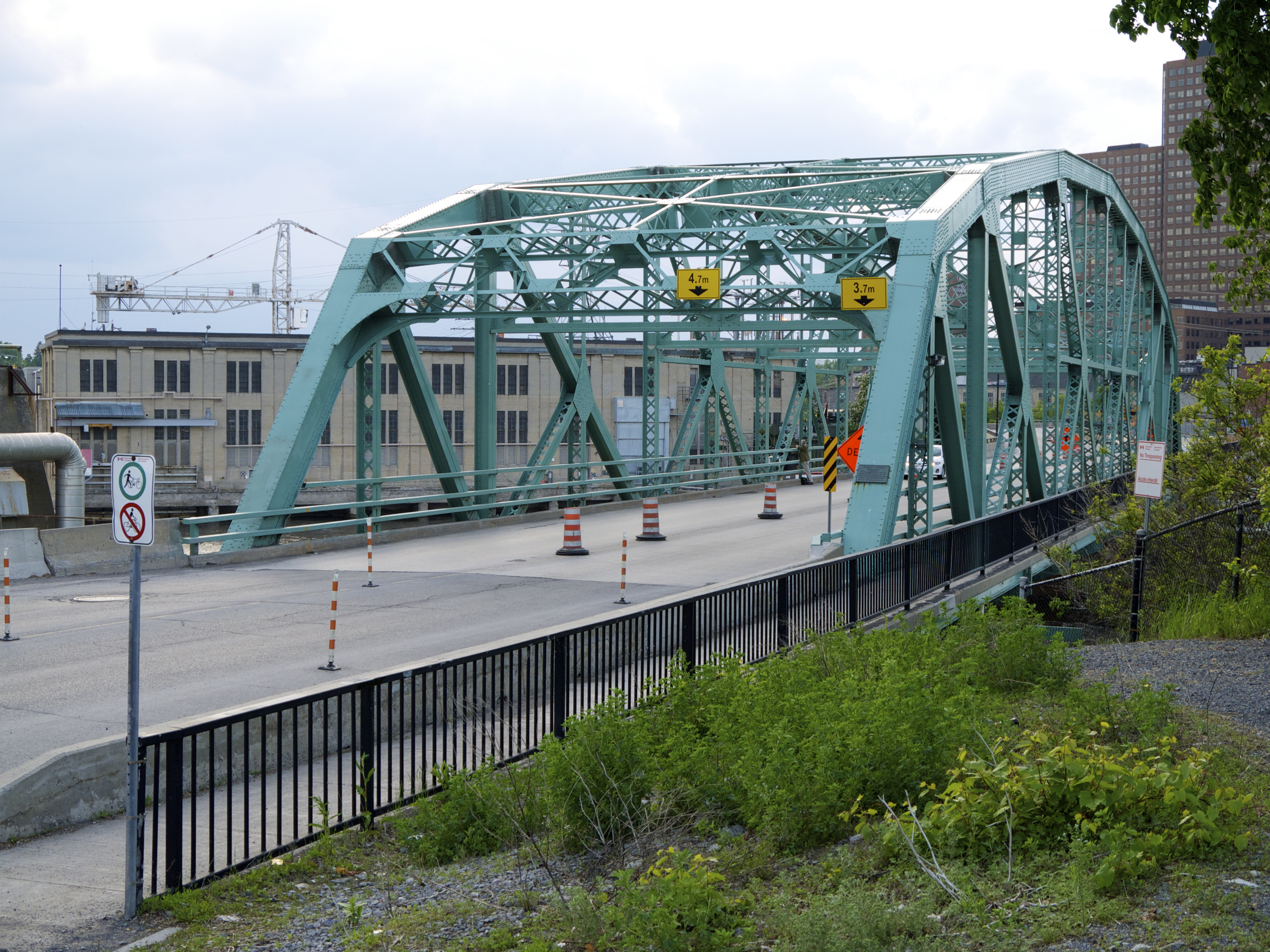
Highway 31 ended at the Chaudière Bridge into Hull, Quebec prior to 1997

Highway 31 was a 76.93-kilometre (47.80 mi) south–north route that somewhat paralleled Highway 16 between the St. Lawrence and Ottawa rivers. It travelled in a north–northwest direction across eastern Ontario, servicing the communities of Morrisburg, Williamsburg and Winchester, as well as travelling into downtown Ottawa via Gloucester. Since then, it has been known as Stormont, Dundas and Glengarry (SDG) County Road 31 and Ottawa Road 31.

At the time it was decommissioned in 1997 and 1998, Highway 31 began at Highway 2 in the community of Morrisburg, approximately 0.8 kilometres (0.50 mi) from the shores of the St. Lawrence River. Today, this intersection is now a roundabout. It travelled northerly, passing over the CN Kingston Subdivision next to Morrisburg Station, a former Via Rail stop that was closed in 2021. The route crossed Highway 401 at an interchange (Exit 750) and proceeded to be surrounded by farmland. It travels through the community of Glen Becker, Williamsburg and The Sixth as it crosses the municipality of South Dundas. The route then enters the municipality of North Dundas at Winchester Springs, near which it crosses several creeks and irrigation drains. It passes through the community of Cass Bridge, providing access to the conservation area of the same name, before encountering the eastern leg of former Highway 43.

Highway 31 and Highway 43 travelled concurrently as they bypassed southwest of Winchester, crossing over the CP Rail Winchester subdivision along the way. To the west of the village, the two routes parted ways, and Highway 31 continued north. It passed through the community of Cloverdale, then swerved west to avoid the community of Harmony before entering what was then known as the Regional Municipality of Ottawa–Carleton at Marionville Road. Within the former Osgoode Township the highway bisected the village of Vernon and the community of Spring Hill before beginning to meander northeast. It crossed the North Castor River at Greely, then entered the city of Gloucester at Regional Road 8 (Mitch Owens Road).

Within Gloucester, Highway 31 travelled straight north-northeast through the community of Leitrim before once again meandering northeast. It entered the bedroom community of Blossom Park before crossing into the city of Ottawa at Regional Road 32 (Hunt Club Road). Within Ottawa, Highway 31 continued as a Connecting Link, following Bank Street through the South Keys neighbourhood and crossing CN's Walkely Line into the Heron Gate neighbourhood. It turned west onto Regional Road 16 (Heron Road). It turned north onto the Airport Parkway, which becomes Bronson Avenue upon crossing the Rideau River. Highway 31 followed Bronson Avenue, meeting an interchange with Highway 417 (the Queensway), and turning southwest onto Albert Street. It then turned north onto Booth Street and ended at the Ontario–Quebec boundary on the Chaudière Bridge over the Ottawa River, where it continued as Eddy Street into Hull.

== History ==
Facing south along Bank Street from Wellington Street at the turn of the 20th century. Bank Street would be incorporated into the route of Highway 31 in 1936.

=== Assumption and paving ===
Highway 31 was first established as a provincial highway on July 2, 1927, when 32.6 kilometres (20.3 mi) of roads were assumed by the Department of Public Highways within the townships of Williamsburgh, Winchester and Mountain. The highway inexplicably ended at the Dundas–Carleton county boundary south of Vernon for the next decade. On July 29, 1936, the highway was extended 35.4 kilometres (22.0 mi) into Ottawa when the Metcalfe Road through Osgoode and Gloucester townships in Carleton County was assumed by the renamed Department of Highways (DHO); it was now 78.0 kilometres (48.5 mi) long.

While the Metcalfe Road was already fully paved by the time Highway 31 was established, the portion of the route assumed in 1927 was unpaved in its entirety. Paving of the highway with a concrete surface began in the early 1930s; the first portion, from Winchester north to the Dundas–Carleton county line, was completed in 1931, a distance of approximately 10.5 kilometres (6.5 mi). Just over 11 kilometres (6.8 mi) of the route, from Morrisburg to Williamsburg, was paved in 1933. This was followed in 1934 with another 7.25 kilometres (4.5 mi) of paving south from Winchester. The final 7.25-kilometre gap north of Williamsburg was paved in 1936.

=== Realignments and route changes ===
Highway 31 at Cass Bridge in 1931

While the southern terminus of Highway 31 was always at Highway 2, the construction of the St. Lawrence Seaway in the late-1950s resulted in a substantial alteration to the route of the latter. Highway 2 originally followed what is now Lakeshore Drive, which was inundated in July 1958 by the rising waters of the seaway east of Morrisburg. Highway 2 was rerouted along the former CN railway right-of-way (itself moved further inland) prior to the flooding, with the new alignment opening to traffic in May 1958. As a result, Highway 31 was truncated by approximately 800 metres (2,600 ft).

Originally, Highway 31 entered into Winchester along St. Lawrence Street before turning west onto Main Street. As early as 1965, proposals for bypassing the village were raised. After lengthy delays over whether or not to cross a Canadian Pacific Railway line at-grade, among other issues, construction began on the bypass in 1972. Highway 31 and Highway 43 were rerouted on to the Winchester Bypass when it was opened on July 30, 1974.

Within Ottawa

When Highway 31 was extended to Ottawa in 1937, provincial jurisdiction ended at Billings Bridge, where Bank Street crossed the Rideau River and entered the city limits. The portion with Ottawa, which was maintained and signed under a Connecting Link agreement with the provincial government, initially followed Bank Street directly to the foot of Parliament Hill at Wellington Street. It became concurrent with Highways 17/15/16 north of Carling Avenue (renamed Glebe Avenue in 1974), and a secondary route of all four highways also followed Rideau Canal Drive (now the Queen Elizabeth Driveway) between Carling Avenue and Wellington Street via Elgin Street. The 1955 Ontario Road map shows a new routing through Ottawa for the first time, with all four concurrent highways turning east onto Rideau Canal Drive off Bank Street on the north side of the Rideau Canal. The 1956 edition of the map continues to show Highway 31 also following Bank Street to Wellington Street in addition to the portion along Rideau Canal Drive. In the 1960 edition, both routes were removed and Highway 31 was rerouted along Heron Road and Bronson Avenue to end at Highway 17 at Carling Avenue. This was altered in the 1964 edition, as Highway 17 was moved onto the partially-completed Queensway; Highway 31 and 16 now continued from Carling Avenue north to the Bronson Avenue interchange (now Exit 121A). It is unclear when Highway 31 was signed north of the Queensway to the Quebec boundary, but it is shown as the northern terminus in the 1989 Highways Distance Tables.

=== Downloading ===
As part of a series of budget cuts initiated by premier Mike Harris under his Common Sense Revolution platform in 1995, numerous highways deemed to no longer be of significance to the provincial network were decommissioned and responsibility for the routes transferred to a lower level of government, a process referred to as downloading. Due to its proximity to Highway 16, which was in the process of being upgraded to Highway 416, the entirety of Highway 31 was downloaded in 1997 and 1998. On April 1, 1997, 10.9 kilometres (6.8 mi) of the route, from Regional Road 8 (Mitch Owens Road) to the Ottawa city limits south of Regional Road 32 (Hunt Club Road), was transferred to the Regional Municipality of Ottawa–Carleton. On January 1, 1998, the remainder of the route was downloaded, including 18.6 kilometres (11.6 mi) to Ottawa–Carleton and 35.7 kilometres (22.2 mi) to the United Counties of Stormont, Dundas and Glengarry.

== Major intersections ==
The following table lists the major junctions along Highway 31, as noted by the Ministry of Transportation of Ontario in the 1997 Provincial Highways Distance Table.

Division	Location	km	mi	Destinations	Notes
Stormont, Dundas and Glengarry	Morrisburg	0.00	0.00	Highway 2 – Kingston, Cornwall	Roadway continues south as County Road 4; beginning of Morrisburg Connecting Link agreement
Stormont, Dundas and Glengarry	Morrisburg	2.07	1.29	Highway 401 – Kingston, Cornwall	Exit 750; end of Morrisburg Connecting Link agreement
Stormont, Dundas and Glengarry	South Dundas	4.35	2.70	County Road 28 east – Froatburn	
Stormont, Dundas and Glengarry	Williamsburg	8.42	5.23		Start of Williamsburg Connecting Link agreement
Stormont, Dundas and Glengarry	Williamsburg	9.41	5.85	County Road 18 – Dixons Corners, Osnabruck Centre	
Stormont, Dundas and Glengarry	Williamsburg	9.96	6.19		End of Williamsburg Connecting Link agreement
Stormont, Dundas and Glengarry	South Dundas	12.99	8.07	County Road 7 (Saving Street)	
Stormont, Dundas and Glengarry	Winchester Springs	16.99	10.56	County Road 5 west	
Stormont, Dundas and Glengarry	Winchester	22.62	14.06	Highway 43 east – Chesterville; County Road 38 west	Southern end of Highway 43 concurrency, southern end of Winchester Bypass
Stormont, Dundas and Glengarry	Winchester	23.15	14.38	County Road 38 east	
Stormont, Dundas and Glengarry	Winchester	26.57	16.51	Highway 43 west – Kemptville; County Road 3 east	Northern end of Highway 43 concurrency, northern end of Winchester Bypass
Stormont, Dundas and Glengarry	North Dundas	32.10	19.95	County Road 13 east (Morewood Road)	
Ottawa–Carleton	Osgoode	39.87	24.77	Regional Road 4	
Ottawa–Carleton	Osgoode	45.96	28.56	Regional Road 6 – Metcalfe	
Ottawa–Carleton	Osgoode–Gloucester boundary	54.54	33.89	Regional Road 8	
Ottawa–Carleton	Gloucester	60.82	37.79	Regional Road 14 (Leitrim Road)	
Ottawa–Carleton	Gloucester	61.54	38.24	Regional Road 125 east (Convoy Road)	
Ottawa–Carleton	Gloucester	63.08	39.20	Regional Road 24 (Lester Road); Davidson Road	
Ottawa–Carleton	Gloucester	65.29	40.57	Regional Road 25 (Albion Road)	
Ottawa–Carleton	Ottawa	68.02	42.27	Heron Road / Bank Street	Highway 31 follows Heron Road
Ottawa–Carleton	Ottawa	69.32	43.07	Highway 16 south (Heron Road) Bronson Avenue / Airport Parkway	Highway 31 follows Bronson Avenue; beginning of Highway 16 concurrency; to Ottawa Macdonald–Cartier International Airport
Ottawa–Carleton	Ottawa	73.48	45.66	Highway 17B west (Carling Avenue)	Beginning of Highway 17B concurrency
Ottawa–Carleton	Ottawa	73.93	45.94	Highway 417 / Highway 17 (Queensway) / TCH	Highway 16 northern terminus; Highway 417 exit 121A
Ottawa–Carleton	Ottawa	73.93	45.94	Highway 17B east (Isabella Street / Catherine Street)	One-way pair, Highway 417 is located between the streets; end of Highway 17B concurrency
Ottawa River		76.93	47.80	Chaudière Bridge	
Ottawa River		76.93	47.80	Rue Eddy to R-148 – Hull	Continuation into Quebec
1.000 mi = 1.609 km; 1.000 km = 0.621 mi: Concurrency terminus
