= Prince of Wales Drive =

Road in Ottawa, Ontario, Canada

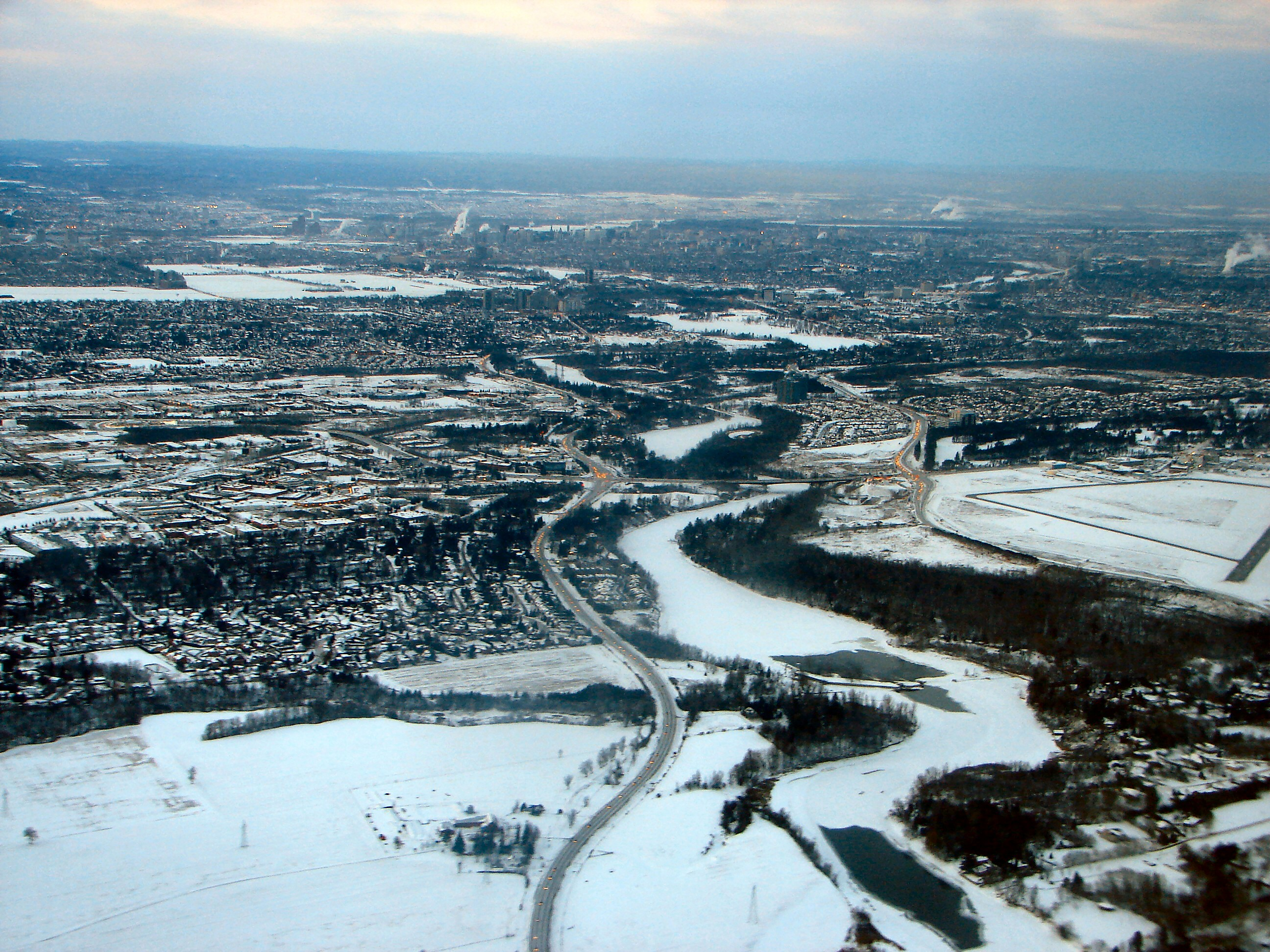
Prince of Wales Drive is the road in the centre of the photo along the Rideau River.

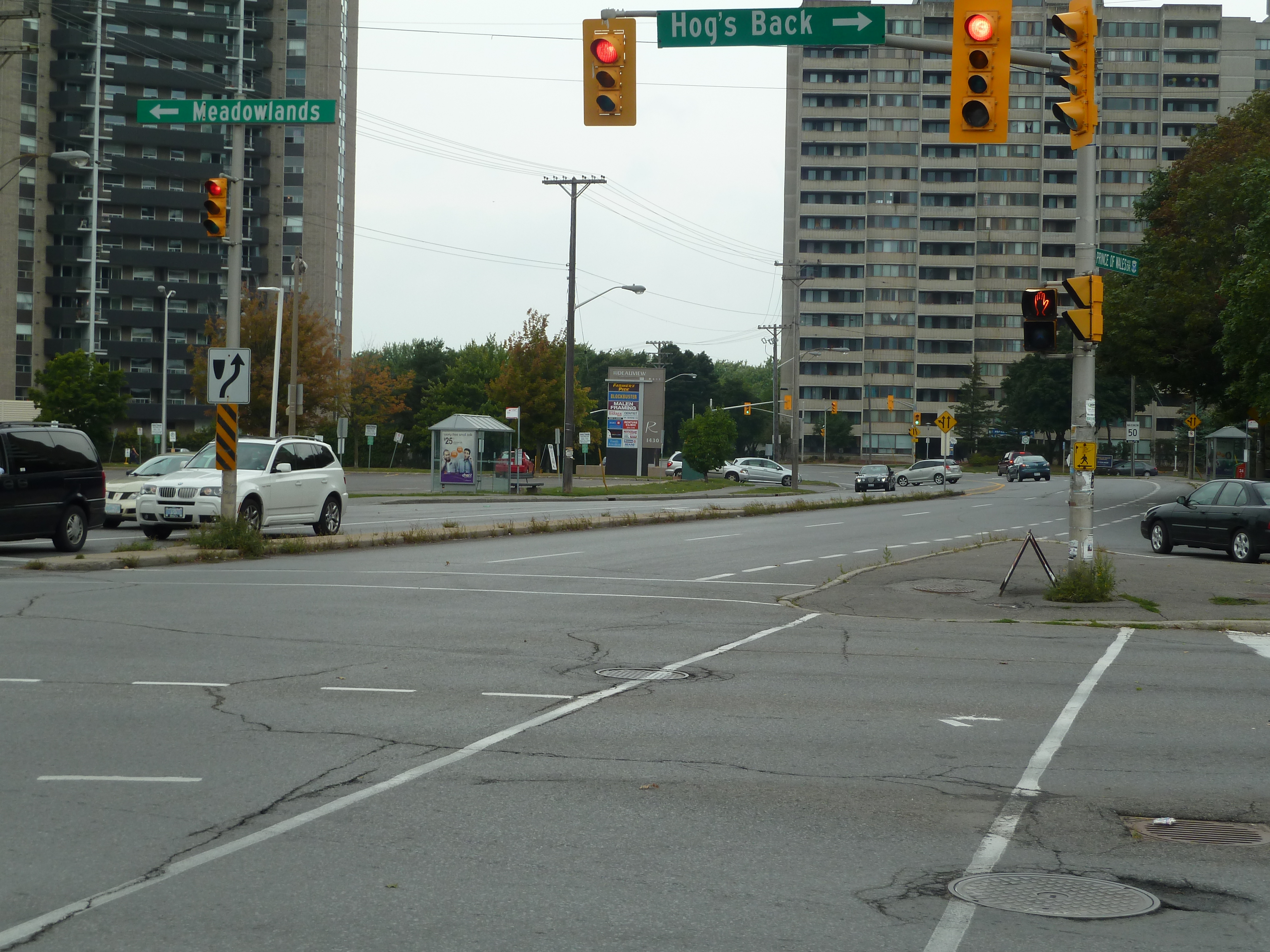
Prince of Wales Drive at Hog's Back Road and Meadowlands Drive

Prince of Wales Drive (Ottawa Road #73) is a road serving Ottawa, Ontario. The northern section is a low-speed street running along the west bank of the Rideau River, while southern portions of the road were formerly Highway 16 (downgraded after the construction of Highway 416).

Prince of Wales Drive is the continuation of Queen Elizabeth Driveway beyond Preston Street. It runs around Dow's Lake and through the Central Experimental Farm before reaching a roundabout. The speed limit is 50 km/h (31 mph) down to Fisher Avenue, at which point it increases to 60 km/h (37 mph). There is a major intersection with Hunt Club Road, where several commuters from south Nepean use the bridge to cross the Rideau River.

Prince of Wales Drive follows the Rideau River past Barrhaven and Manotick. South of the intersection with Longfields Drive, the road diverts from the river and heads in a southwesterly direction toward North Gower, where it terminates at Fourth Line Road.

Prior to the construction of Highway 416, the stretch of Highway 16 that included Prince of Wales continued south to the Canada–US border into Saint Lawrence County, New York.

In May 2007, the City approved the start of an environmental assessment study with regard to the future widening of the road from Fisher Avenue to Woodroffe Avenue from two to four lanes to accommodate future expansion in Barrhaven, Manotick and Riverside South.

== Major intersections ==
- Preston Street
- Baseline Road & Heron Road
- Meadowlands Drive & Hog's Back Road
- Hunt Club Road
- Fallowfield Road
- Merivale Road
- Strandherd Drive
- Longfields Drive
- Bankfield Road
- Fourth Line Road

== See also ==
- Royal eponyms in Canada
