= Heron Road Workers Memorial Bridge =

Bridge in Ottawa, Ontario, Canada

Coordinates: 45°22′33″N 75°42′00″W

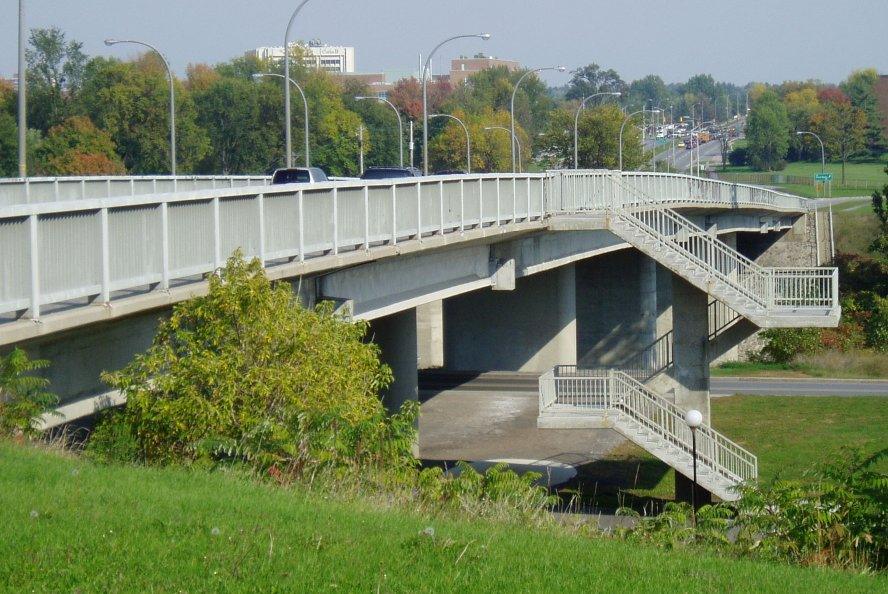
The Heron Road Workers Memorial Bridge

The Heron Road Workers Memorial Bridge (formerly the Heron Road Bridge) is a bridge in Ottawa, Ontario, Canada. It connects Baseline Road to Heron Road and allows east–west traffic to cross both the Rideau River and the Rideau Canal just south of Carleton University. The current bridge was finished in 1967, one year after a bridge collapse killed nine workers and injured over sixty others in the worst construction accident in both Ottawa and Ontario history. It was renamed in 2016 to commemorate the victims of that accident.

== Planning and early construction ==
Ottawa Mayor Charlotte Whitton initially opposed the plans of Prime Minister John Diefenbaker to build the bridge to ease east–west traffic in the city. In 1961, Diefenbaker's government threatened to reduce the amount of federal grants to Ottawa by the cost of the bridge if the city did not agree to build it. After further negotiations, an agreement on building the bridge was signed by the municipal, provincial, and federal governments in 1964.

The original construction plan included two three-lane, 300-metre-long (980 ft) bridges, one eastbound and one westbound, and was budgeted at two and a half million dollars. The bridge was slightly north of Hog's Back Falls and was to connect Baseline Road and Heron Road over the Rideau River and the Rideau Canal for both motorists and pedestrians.

The City of Ottawa awarded the contract to build the footings of the concrete piers supporting the bridge to Beaver Construction in February 1965. This work was completed by June 1965. The final plan for the project still had two three-lane bridges, but the prestressed concrete bridges would only be 877.5 feet long. In August 1965, the city awarded the bridge construction contract to O.J. Gaffney Ltd and hired M.M. Dillon & Company Ltd as consulting engineers for designing and supervising the project.

Each bridge had four spans, for which the concrete was poured in two layers. Work started in fall 1965 on the western spans, which were mostly finished by August 1966. Meanwhile, wooden falsework was used to support the less complete eastern spans still being built. The first concrete layer for the third of both bridges' four spans had been poured back in July 1966 without issue.

== August 10, 1966 collapse ==
On August 10, 1966, a shift of about sixty to seventy workers were almost finished pouring 1,800 metric tons (2,000 short tons) of concrete on the eastern side of the partially completed third span of the southern bridge when it collapsed at 3:27 p.m. According to an eyewitness account from a M.M. Dillon manager, the crew had been pouring concrete eastwards from the centre of the span when the western end of the span was flipped upwards and onto the rest of the bridge, bringing it down.

The wooden falsework on the bridge failed and workers on the bridge fell between fifteen and twenty metres to the ground, while rebars, cement, wood, concrete, and other building materials fell on them. The collapse created a loud impact noise and a cloud of dust. It also triggered the nearby Dominion Observatory's seismometer, which prompted officials to issue a statement that the collapse had not been caused by an earthquake. Many workers panicked and ran or swam away from the site after the collapse, while others ran to the site to help the victims. People picnicking in nearby Vincent Massey Park arrived on the scene to help shortly before emergency services. Ottawa mayor Don Reid also came to the scene and joined in the rescue efforts with a pair of bolt cutters.

Most of the injured were taken to the Civic Hospital, which was in the middle of switching from day to night shifts, allowing many medical staff to stay and deal with the influx of patients or to travel to the site to provide aid such as administering morphine to trapped workers. The high number of patients forced the hospital to cancel all elective procedures and relocate patients in wings adjacent to the emergency room so the injured construction workers could be kept together. Because many of the injured were recently arrived Europeans who were not fluent in English, were not carrying their identification at the time of the accident, and were covered in concrete, many blood transfusions were done without having a patient name, contrary to standard operating procedure.

Over one third of the 183 workers were treated at the Civic Hospital, while the Ottawa General Hospital and the National Defence Medical Centre received just two patients each. The surgeon of the General Hospital criticized the focus on sending patients to the overwhelmed, but nearby Civic Hospital, when his hospital only received their first patient at 4:30 p.m. despite having its staff on standby in anticipation of a patient influx.

Rescue efforts ended at 3:30 a.m. when it became too dark to continue using the required machinery. Nine men died as a result of the collapse: seven were killed on site, one died at the Civic Hospital, and another died from his injuries in September. Over sixty workers were injured, mostly from the falling wet cement that had just been poured on the bridge when it collapsed. Among the dead were Leonard Baird, the project's resident engineer, and Clarence Beattie, the site foreman; the other seven workers who died were Jean Paul Guerin, Omer Lamadeleine, Edmund Newton, Lucien Regimbald, Dominic Romano, Raymond Tremblay, and Joao Viegas. The accident remains the deadliest construction accident in both Ottawa and Ontario history.

=== Inquest and aftermath ===
An inquest into the collapse was completed in November 1966 after a week of testimony from over seventy witnesses. The total cost for the inquest was $100,000. It was led by Ontario coroner H.B. Cotnam, who retained the engineering firm H.G. Acres Ltd to help conduct the investigation. Officially, the inquest was into the causes of death for site foreman Clarence Beattie.

The inquest blamed the lack of proper diagonal bracing on the wooden falsework supporting the concrete. University of Toronto engineering department head Carson Morrison gave expert evidence using wooden models to show flaws in the unbraced falsework's design. The inquest found that the weight of even one layer of concrete being placed to form the bridge deck exceeded the weight that the supports could hold, and that a second collapse was imminent as supports near the collapsed area showed signs of buckling. Secondary contributing factors included the use of green lumber, which was weaker than mature wood, differences between how the footings settled, and temporary overload of some of the posts.

The inquest heard testimony that a third design for the falsework, which did not include diagonal bracing, was meant by the consulting engineers to supplement the previous design, which did have the bracing. However it was interpreted by the construction firm as being a complete and final design. There was conflicting evidence about who was responsible for the change to remove the bracing from the design, with the Gaffney construction firm blaming M.M. Dillon, their engineering consultants, who denied they were responsible. Furthermore, municipal and provincial safety inspectors noticed the lack of diagonal bracing but were reassured by the engineering student leading the inspection tour that it had been approved by qualified engineers. Because the inspectors were not trained engineers and had been told not to question qualified engineers, the lack of bracing was not reported.

Oliver Gaffney, the owner and namesake of the construction firm building the bridge, accepted only partial responsibility for the falsework's design and construction, arguing that the design and method of construction had been approved by M.M Dillon, their design consulting engineering firm. John Bromley, the project engineer at Dillon in charge of approving the falsework design, testified that the fault for not recognizing the fatal lack of diagonal bracing was his alone and said that "My mind must have been a bit confused at the time."

The inquest found that O.J. Gaffney Ltd. of Stratford, Ontario, and M.M Dillon Co. were both responsible for the bridge collapse. O.J. Gaffney Ltd. was found guilty on two charges and fined $5,000, the maximum allowed penalty under the existing Construction Safety Act. As a result of the findings, the Association of Professional Engineers of Ontario suspended two of its members, including Bromley, for one year and reprimanded a third.

The inquest jury also made a series of recommendations to prevent future accidents of this type. These included clearly defining the roles and responsibilities of construction firms and engineering consultants, stricter training and reporting requirements for inspectors, and requirements that falsework designs be stamped by a qualified engineer and use appropriate lumber. It also recommended creating a mandatory provincial building code for falsework and bridge construction. The recommendations of the inquest prompted a rewrite of the Construction Safety Act to increase workplace safety standards.

Widows of those killed in the accident received a lump sum payout of $300 to cover the cost of a funeral, an allowance of $75 per month, and $40-$50 per month for each child still in school.

The bridge was rebuilt and opened to the public on June 29, 1967.

== Later history ==
In November 1987, a plaque honouring the nine workers killed was placed just west of the bridge on Heron Road. In the same year, the Canadian Labour Congress built a monument in nearby Vincent Massey Park to Canadians killed and injured at work.

From February 2011 to October 2012, Heron Road Bridge was closed because of a $15 million rehabilitation project — part of the city's Ottawa on the Move infrastructure plan — that improved its bearings, expansion joints, and pavement, among other changes.

In July 2016, after a campaign by the Ottawa and District Labour Council, Ottawa City Council voted to rename the bridge the Heron Road Workers Memorial Bridge to honour the victims of the collapse. A rededication ceremony was held at the aforementioned plaque on August 10, 2016, the fiftieth anniversary of the collapse, and included three workers who survived the collapse, Mayor Jim Watson, local City Councillor Riley Brockington, the president of the Ottawa and District Labour Council, as well as the relatives of the victims. A new plaque was unveiled at the event.

== See also ==
- List of bridge failures
- List of bridges in Canada
- List of bridges in Ottawa
