= Hunt Club Road =

Road in Ottawa, Ontario, Canada

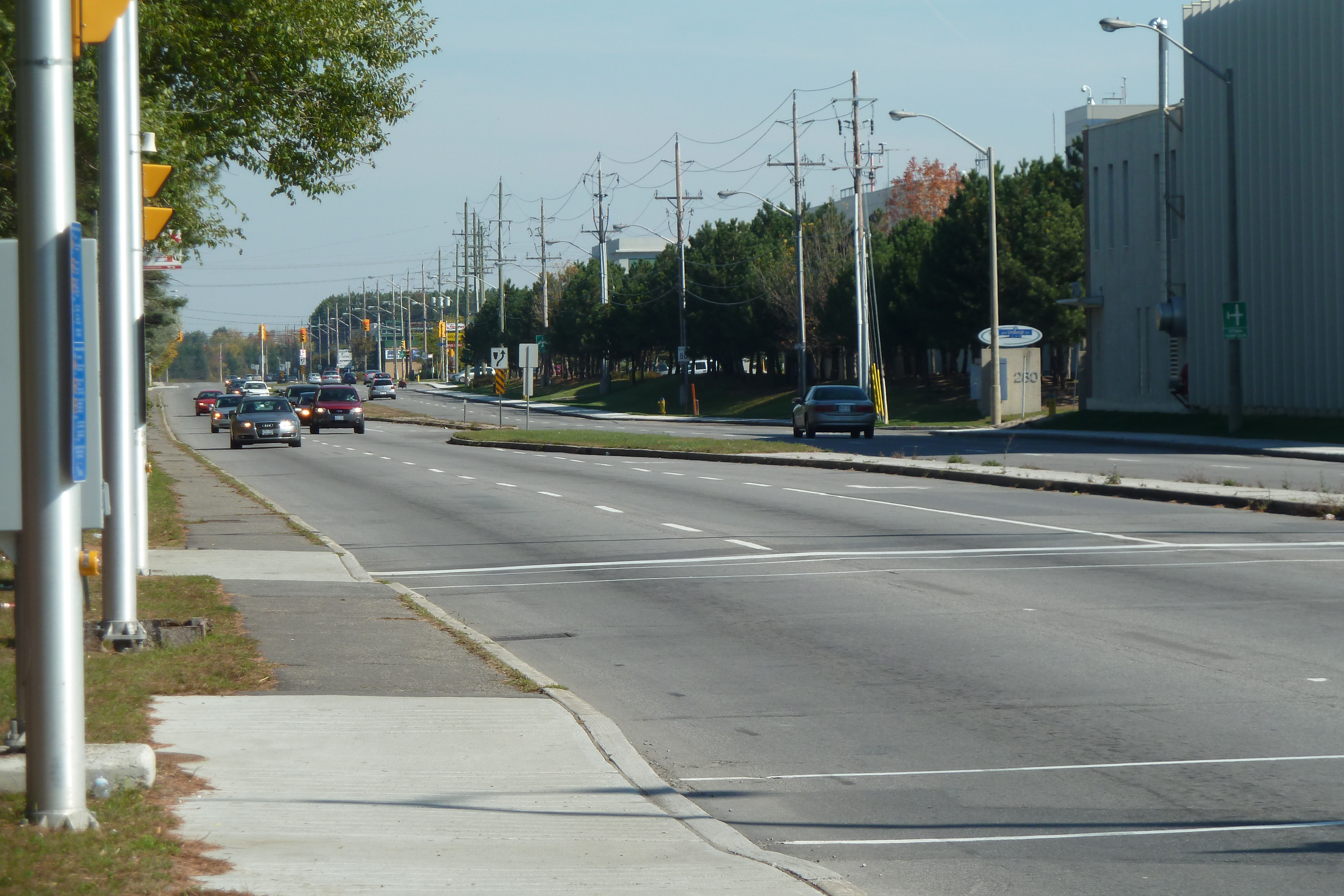
Hunt Club Road just east of Riverside Drive

Hunt Club Road, also known as Ottawa Road 32, is a major east–west route in Ottawa, Ontario, Canada. It originally ran from a dead end east of Bank Street (Ottawa Road 31, formerly Ontario Highway 31) to the Ottawa Hunt and Golf Club; later, there were many extensions due to the 1970s housing boom, first westward to Riverside Drive, then eastward to Hawthorne Road in the late 1980s. The section between Bank Street and Riverside Drive, originally only one lane in each direction, was expanded to two lanes in each direction in 1993–1994. It was further extended across the Rideau River and the southern edge of the suburbs to Old Richmond Road by the late 1990s; this extension is signed as West Hunt Club Road by the City of Ottawa. Construction to extend Hunt Club eastward to Highway 417 near Ramsayville was completed on 21 August 2014.

Most of Hunt Club Road is a four-lane divided principal arterial road with limited access, particularly between just west of Merivale Road and Highway 416, where it is an at-grade urban expressway. The section east of Merivale, originally a tank farm, has transformed into a major big-box retail area.

The speed limit on most sections is 80 km/h (50 mph) except in the South Keys and Greenboro areas where it is 60 km/h (37 mph).

The Michael J.E. Sheflin Bridge, better known as the Hunt Club Bridge, carries the road over the Rideau River between Prince of Wales Drive (former Highway 16) and Riverside Drive. The bridge was widened over the summer of 2006, extending the left turn lanes in both directions over the full length of the bridge.

The City's Transportation Master Plan includes the widening of the road to six lanes between Highway 416 and Bank Street.

Located along the road are Pine Grove Park and the Stoney Swamp Conservation Area.

== Major Intersections ==
- Ottawa Road 59 (Old Richmond Road)
- Ottawa Road 11 (Moodie Drive)
- Highway 416 (Veterans Memorial Highway)
- Ottawa Road 23 (Cedarview Road)
- Ottawa Road 13 (Greenbank Road)
- Ottawa Road 15 (Woodroffe Avenue)
- Ottawa Road 17 (Merivale Road)
- Ottawa Road 73 (Prince of Wales Drive, formerly Ontario Highway 16), extended to Prince of Wales between 1984 and 1987
- Ottawa Road 19 (Riverside Drive)
- Ottawa Road 79 (Airport Parkway)
- Ottawa Road 31 (Bank Street, formerly Ontario Highway 31)
- Albion Road
- Ottawa Road 125 (Conroy Road)
- Ottawa Road 32 (Hawthorne Road)
- Highway 417

== Communities ==
- Uplands
- South Keys
- Greenboro
