= Ontario Highway 16 =

Ontario provincial highway

Highway 16
- Highway 16 highlighted in red

Route information
- Maintained by Ministry of Transportation of Ontario
- Length: 3.6 km (2.2 mi)

Major junctions
- South end: County Road 2 – Johnstown
- NY 812 at the Ogdensburg–Prescott Border Crossing – Johnstown; Highway 401 – Edwardsburgh/Cardinal
- North end: Highway 416 – Edwardsburgh/Cardinal

Location
- Country: Canada
- Province: Ontario
- Counties: Leeds and Grenville

Highway system
- Ontario provincial highways; Current; Former; 400-series
← Highway 15	→ Highway 17

King's Highway 16, commonly referred to as Highway 16 and historically as the Prescott Highway, is a provincially maintained highway in the Canadian province of Ontario. The highway once travelled from near Prescott to Ottawa, traversing the distance between the St. Lawrence River and the Ottawa River. However, its length was truncated significantly when most of the route was twinned with a second roadway, and renumbered as Highway 416. A short stub remains through Johnstown, providing access to the Ogdensburg–Prescott International Bridge across the St. Lawrence River to Ogdensburg, New York, where New York State Route 812 continues south.

The Ottawa–Prescott Road, designated in 1918, was one of the first three highways designated in Ontario. By the time the route was numbered as Provincial Highway 16 in August 1925, it was mostly paved, except for portions south of Kemptville, which were paved by 1930. It immediately became the primary route between Toronto and Ottawa, via Highway 2, and as such saw many improvements and realignments carried out over the next three decades. In the 1960s, plans arose for a controlled-access highway to connect Highway 401 with Ottawa, which resulted in the construction of a complete realignment of Highway 16 north of Johnstown. This two-lane highway, known as Highway 16 New, was built between 1969 and 1983; enough land was purchased to build a second two-lane roadway to twin the highway. The twinned roadway was completed between 1989 and 1999, after which the route was renumbered with a 400-series designation.

Former portions of Highway 16 can be followed north from Johnstown, through Spencerville and Kemptville to the Rideau River along Leeds and Grenville County Road 44. Beyond the River it followed Ottawa Road 5 to North Gower, and thereafter Ottawa Road 73 (Prince of Wales Drive) into downtown Ottawa.

== History ==
=== Initial designation ===
The Ottawa–Prescott Road, before being improved by the DPHO, was narrow, ungraded, and featured brush fences that intruded into the roadway

Early impetus for a route connecting Ottawa to the St. Lawrence River began with lobbying by automobile clubs in the early 1910s. The Prescott Highway was established as a provincial highway in 1918, shortly after The Provincial Highway (which would become Highway 2). The 92.7 km (57.6 mi) Ottawa–Prescott Highway was assumed by the Department of Public Highways (DPHO) on August 15. The new route was initially in an unfit condition for traffic. For example, the 1918 DPHO Annual Report noted that in North Gower Township, the road "was in places very narrow and the sides grown up with brush and small trees. The road surface was in very bad shape." Work began immediately to clear, widen, grade, and gravel the route, which was in many cases only 10 m (33 ft) wide between the overgrown fence lines. Paving began in 1922, starting at the Central Experimental Farm in Ottawa, and progressing in a southerly direction for approximately 6.5 km (4.0 mi). By mid-1923, the route was paved through Spencerville and North Gower, and work was underway to pave it within Manotick.

Until the summer of 1925, Ontario highways were named rather than numbered. When route numbering was introduced, the Prescott Highway became Provincial Highway 16. That year also saw paving completed through Kemptville to the Rideau River, as well as beyond North Gower in to Ottawa. This left unpaved segments south of Kemptville (except through Spencerville), and from the Rideau River to the village of North Gower. On October 22, 1928, the pavement between Johnstown and Spencerville was completed and opened to traffic. Premier Howard Ferguson officially opened the completed highway on October 7, 1929, at a rail overpass south of Kemptville. After cutting a ribbon spanning the bridge, he dubbed the route the Prince of Wales Highway.

=== Highway 16 New ===
In 1966 the Eastern Ontario Highway Planning Study was published by the Department of Highways (DHO), the predecessor to today's Ministry of Transportation of Ontario (MTO), identifying the need for a controlled-access highway between Ottawa and Highway 401. Highway 16, which crosses the geologically subdued St. Lawrence Lowlands, was selected over Highway 15, which crosses the undulating Canadian Shield to the west, as the ideal route for the new link. To overcome the issue of abutting properties established along the Highway 16 corridor, the DHO began purchasing a new right-of-way between Highway 401 and Century Road by late 1967 and constructed a two lane bypass of the original alignment, avoiding all the built up areas that the original Highway 16 encountered. This route, dubbed "Highway 16 New", was designed to easily accommodate the eventual upgrade to a freeway when traffic volumes necessitated.

Construction of the super two bypass took place between 1969 and 1983. The Spencerville Bypass opened by 1971, connecting with the old highway in the south near Crowder Road and in the north near Ventnor Road. By the end of 1973 the new highway was completed from immediately north of Highway 401 through Leeds and Grenville United Counties and into Ottawa–Carleton. This included a bypass around Kemptville and a new structure over the Rideau River. The new highway ended at Dilworth Road (Regional Road 13).

For nearly a decade, no new construction took place. Then, during the summer of 1982, the MTO awarded a contract to begin constructing the route north from Dilworth Road towards Manotick, bypassing North Gower. Following the completion of this first contract, which extended the route as far north as Roger Stevens Drive (Regional Road 6) and included a structure over Stevens Creek, a second contract was awarded for the remaining distance north to Century Road (Regional Road 8). The project was completed in 1983, merging into the original route of Highway 16 northeast of the present Prince of Wales Drive overpass.

=== Upgrade and renaming to Highway 416 ===
With the completion of Highway 16 New, there was sufficient right-of-way to construct interchanges and the southbound lanes in order to create a full freeway corridor. The upgrade to Highway 416 took place between 1989 and 1999 and was created by the twinning of 57 km (35 mi) of Highway 16 New, known as Highway 416 "South" during construction. Instead of using Highway 16's existing Parclo interchange with Highway 401 where some ramps had at-grade intersections, this was bypassed by a separate right-of-way so that Highway 416 would meet Highway 401 at a new freeway-to-freeway interchange serving traffic to/from Kingston. Shortly before Highway 416 reaches its southern terminus, an Y interchange was constructed for Highway 16 to branch off where it continues as a short stub through Johnstown.

A short section through downtown Ottawa was not incorporated into Highway 416, instead being downloaded to local authorities where it was redesignated as Ottawa Regional Road 73 (Prince of Wales Drive). North of Prince of Wales Drive, a new freeway alignment (known as Highway 416 "North" during construction) which is 21-kilometre (13 mi) was built alongside Borisokane Road and Cedarview Drive to connect with Highway 417 (The Queensway).

== Route description ==
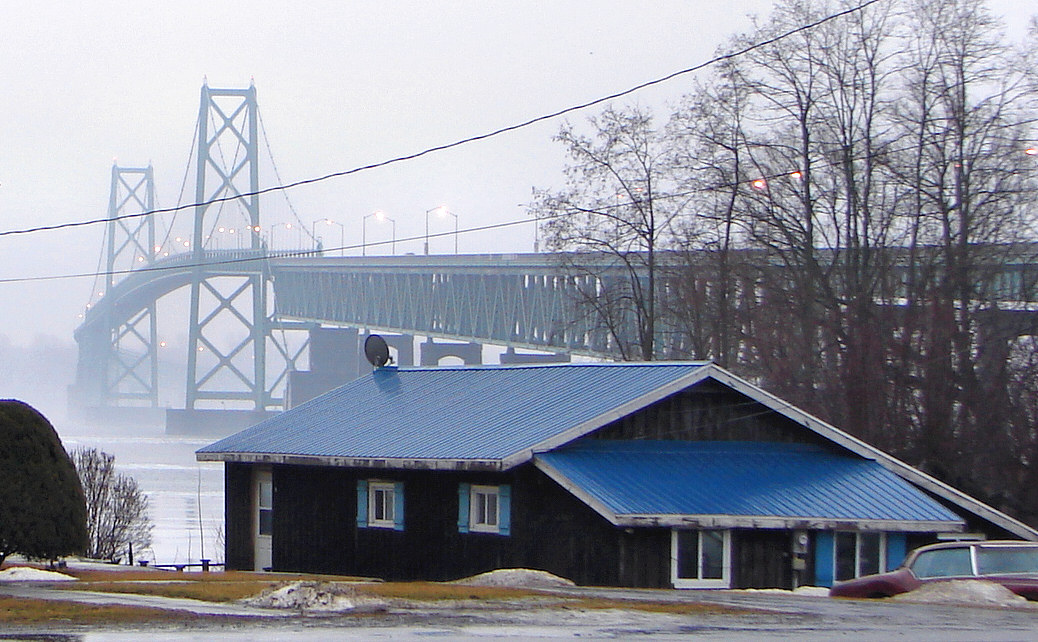
Highway 16 provides access to New York State Route 812 via the Ogdensburg–Prescott International Bridge

Highway 16 is now a very brief route, though it was much longer before the construction of Highway 416 truncated it. The highway begins near the shores of the St. Lawrence River in Johnstown at the former Highway 2, now Leeds and Grenville County Road 2. From there it travels northwest adjacent to the Ogdensburg-Prescott International Bridge, which lies to the southwest. A customs plaza lies at the end of the bridge, north of which the road to the bridge meets the highway; to the northeast is single-detached housing. The highway continues, exiting Johnstown and curving slightly towards the north.

Immediately after crossing over a Canadian National track, the route encounters an interchange with Highway 401 at Exit 721B. This interchange features full access to Highway 401, including movements not possible at the Highway 416 interchange to the west. North of the interchange, the road curves gently to the northwest, intersecting Cedar Grove Road. After this, the opposing directions of travel diverge and become ramps to northbound and from southbound Highway 416.

== Major intersections ==
The following table lists the major junctions along Highway 16, as noted by the Ministry of Transportation of Ontario.

Division	Location	km	mi	Destinations	Notes
Leeds and Grenville	Edwardsburgh/Cardinal	0.0	0.0	County Road 2 – Prescott, Cardinal	Johnstown; formerly Highway 2
Leeds and Grenville	Edwardsburgh/Cardinal	0.6	0.37	NY 812 south to NY 37 – Bridge to U.S.A.	Ogdensburg-Prescott International Bridge is tolled
Leeds and Grenville	Edwardsburgh/Cardinal	1.5	0.93	Highway 401 – Kingston, Cornwall, Montreal	Highway 401 exit 721
Leeds and Grenville	Edwardsburgh/Cardinal	2.1	1.3	County Road 44 north Cedar Grove Road	Original Highway 16 alignment
Leeds and Grenville	Edwardsburgh/Cardinal	3.6	2.2	Highway 416 north – Ottawa	Northbound access and southbound exit; Highway 416 exit 1; former Highway 16 follows current Highway 416 alignment
Leeds and Grenville	North Grenville	36.1	22.4	County Road 43 – Merrickville, Winchester	Kemptville; formerly Highway 43; Highway 416 exit 34
Ottawa		57.3	35.6	Road 73 (Prince of Wales Drive)	Former Highway 16 follows Road 73 north; no direct access from Highway 416
Ottawa		78.4	48.7	Baseline Road / Heron Road (Road 16)	Former Highway 16 follows Heron Road
Ottawa		80.2	49.8	Bronson Avenue / Airport Parkway (Road 79)	Former Highway 16 follows Bronson Avenue; formerly Highway 31 south; former southern end of Highway 31 concurrency; to Ottawa Macdonald–Cartier International Airport
Ottawa		83.1	51.6	Carling Avenue (Road 38 west)	Formerly Highway 17B west; former southern end of Highway 17B concurrency
Ottawa		83.5– 83.7	51.9– 52.0	Highway 417 (Queensway) / TCH	Former Highway 16 northern terminus; Highway 417 exit 121A; formerly Highway 17
Ottawa		83.5– 83.7	51.9– 52.0	Isabella Street (Road 62 east); Catherine Street (Road 60 west)	One-way pair, Highway 417 is located between the streets; formerly Highway 17B east
1.000 mi = 1.609 km; 1.000 km = 0.621 mi: Closed/former; Incomplete access; Tolled
