= Woodroffe Avenue =

Road in Ottawa, Ontario, Canada

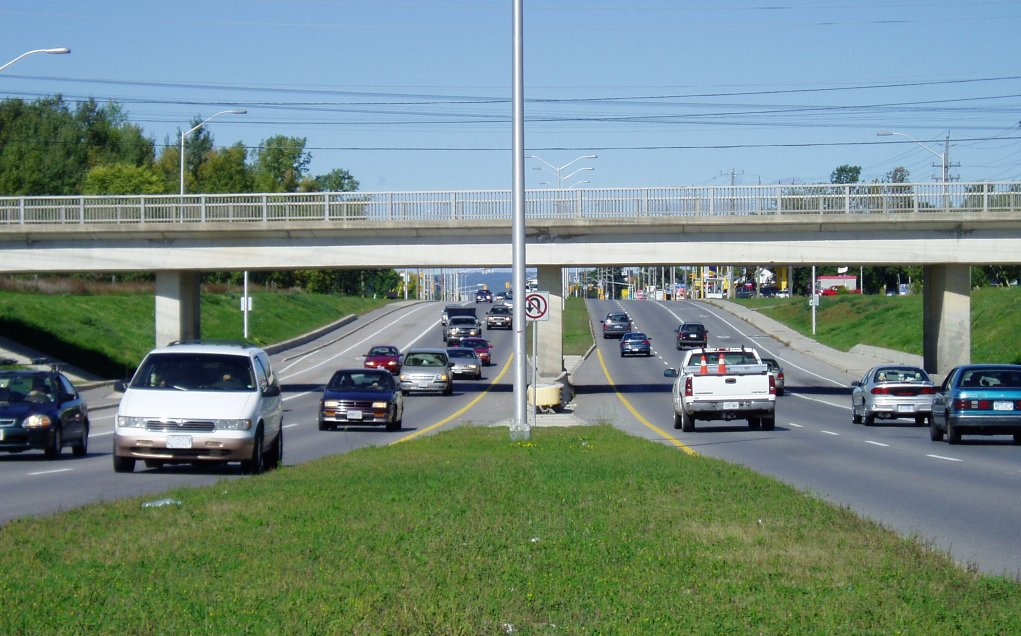
Woodroffe Avenue just north of Knoxdale Road

Woodroffe Avenue (Ottawa Road #15) is a major north-south arterial road in Ottawa, Ontario, Canada's west end. It runs south from the Kichi Zibi Mikan through Baseline Road and Barrhaven to just short of Prince of Wales Drive near Manotick. The road runs through the heart of Nepean in Ottawa's west end. A satellite Via Rail station (Fallowfield station) is also located at the intersection of Fallowfield Road.

== Sights on Woodroffe ==
The northern part of the road, from the Ottawa River to Carling Avenue contains a mix of homes and a number of public institutions. This includes Our Lady Of Fatima Catholic Church, Woodroffe Avenue United Church, Woodroffe Avenue Public School, and the Carlingwood branch of the Ottawa Public Library. Near Carling Avenue, Woodroffe runs along the western edge of the Carlingwood Mall. South of Carling Avenue the avenue is considerably busier, especially around the intersection with the Queensway. This portion of the road is home to St. Paul's Presbyterian Church and D. Roy Kennedy Public School. At Baseline Road the road runs past Algonquin College and the College Square shopping plaza (which replaced Shoppers City West) and the closed Confederation High School. Just to the west is Ben Franklin Place, in the heart of the community of Centrepointe, and the Baseline Station transit complex.

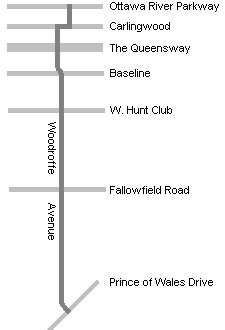
Chart showing the major intersecting streets with Woodroffe

South of Meadowlands Drive, Woodroffe Avenue passes through mainly suburban residential areas and south of Hunt Club Road it passes through the Greenbelt. The most notable site in this area is the large Nepean Sportsplex. After passing through a portion of the Greenbelt, Woodroffe Avenue runs through Barrhaven, serving as the main street of that bedroom community. South of Barrhaven it again goes through some semi-rural areas, before ending just short of Prince of Wales Drive near the Rideau River.

== Features ==
Woodroffe Avenue has a few unusual features. First, it changes alignment significantly at Carling Avenue, requiring a couple of turns. Second, the middle section south of Baseline Road includes dedicated bus lanes as it incorporates the Southwest Transitway. Finally, south of Hunt Club Road, it was quite narrow and very congested as it was a two-lane rural road heading towards Barrhaven. However, the road was recently widened to four lanes to improve traffic flow between Hunt Club Road and Fallowfield Road. A new section of the Transitway was recently built alongside this road.

The geometrics and design of Woodroffe Avenue change rapidly from section to section. The northernmost section north of Carling is mostly a two-lane minor arterial road, which becomes a four-lane principal arterial road south of Carling Avenue as far as Baseline Road. These sections have a speed limit of 50 km/h (31 mph). From Baseline Road to south of Hunt Club Road, Woodroffe Avenue is a four to six-lane principal arterial (plus bus lanes on each side) with a speed limit of 60 km/h (37 mph). From Hunt Club Road to Strandherd Drive, Woodroffe Avenue is mostly a four-lane arterial road (the section north of Fallowfield being more rural). The speed limit is 80 km/h (50 mph) for the most part, with a short section at 70 km/h (43 mph). South of Strandherd Drive, it is still a two-lane road with a speed limit of 80 km/h, however it may decrease in the future with the continuous growth of traffic in the area.

In 2002, a project was announced to widen Woodroffe Avenue from two to four lanes between Fallowfield Park and Ride and Black Rapids Creek. However, it was discovered that there is a rare underground rock formation that would double the cost of the project. It was widened as far south as Longfields Avenue. Another section from Longfields to south of Strandherd Road was widened during the summer of 2007 in conjunction with the widening of the latter from Riocan Marketplace to Crestway Avenue.

In 2016, Woodroffe Avenue was dead-ended at the south end to remove a dangerous intersection with Prince of Wales Drive. Access to Woodroffe Avenue from the south is now via Strandherd Drive.
