= Donnelly Drive =

Road in Ottawa, Canada

Donnelly Drive (Ottawa Road #2) is a rural road in Ottawa, Ontario, Canada.

The road runs along the western bank of the Rideau River from Burritts Rapids to Reevecraig Road South. Between these two points, Donnelly Drive passes through Becketts Landing and passes by Rideau River Provincial Park.

The eastern portion of Donnelly Drive was originally part of Ontario Highway 16. It runs along the Rideau Canal waterway, which was a major trade route in the early 1800s. It also runs close to the border of the city of Ottawa and the United Counties of Leeds And Grenville, which is the Rideau River.

Donnelly Drive turns into Heritage Road once it reaches Burritts Rapids.
