= Baseline Road (Ottawa) =

Road in Ottawa, Ontario, Canada

- "Ottawa Road 16"
- Map of Baseline Road
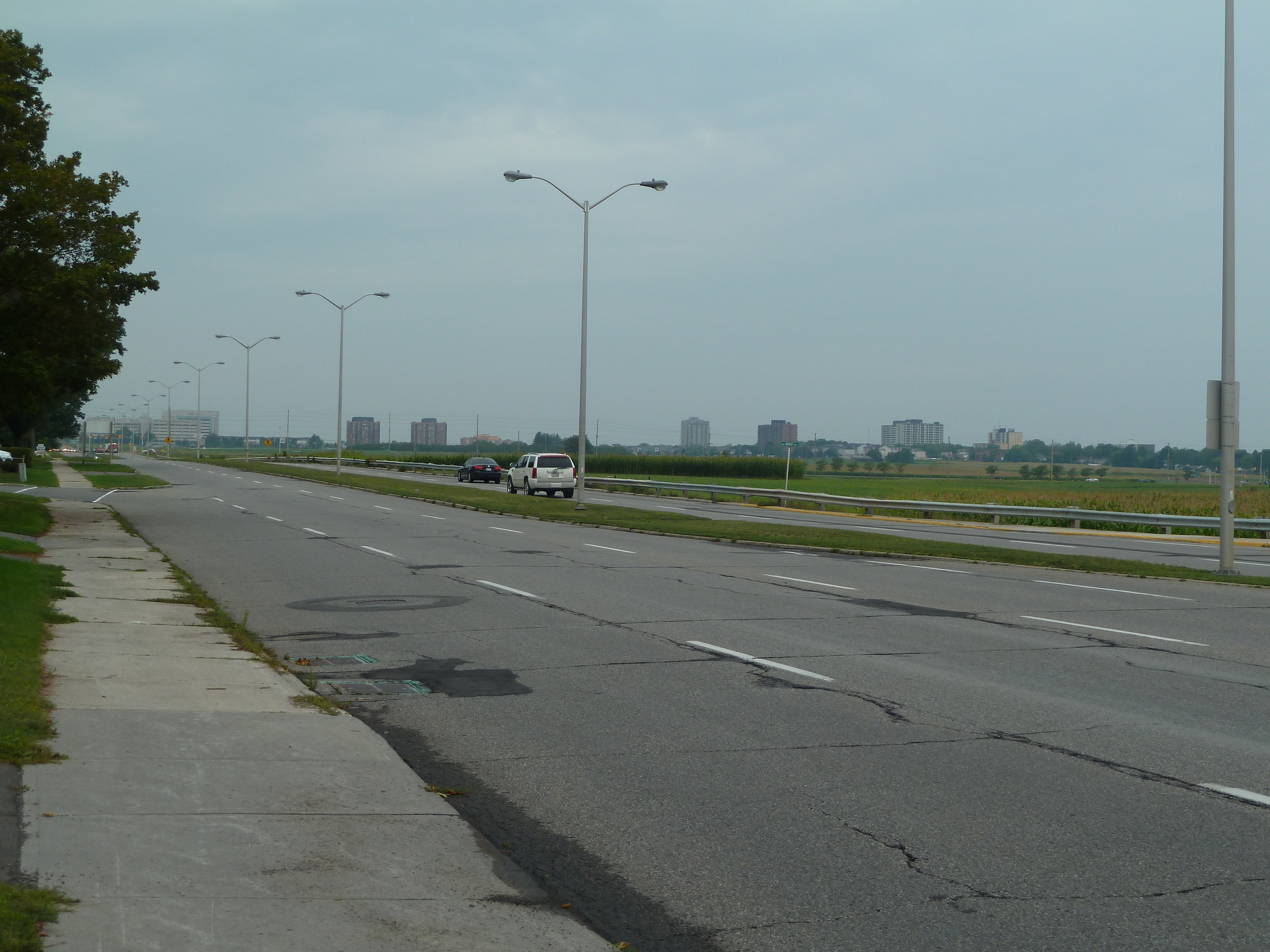
- Baseline Road looking west from Prince of Wales Drive

Route information
- Maintained by City of Ottawa
- Length: 10 km (6.2 mi)

Major junctions
- West end: Richmond Road
- East end: Continues as Heron Road

Location
- Country: Canada
- Province: Ontario
- Major cities: Ottawa

Highway system
- Roads in Ontario

Baseline Road (Ottawa Road 16) is a road in Ottawa, Ontario, Canada.

Baseline runs from Richmond Road (almost directly over Highway 416) east in a straight line until it ends at the Heron Road Bridge over the Rideau River and Rideau Canal when it becomes Heron Road. Before the 2001 City of Ottawa amalgamation, Baseline formed the border of the city of Ottawa and Nepean. The street is named for its location as the baseline for Nepean Township. When Nepean Township was surveyed, Baseline formed the northern boundary of Nepean's six north–south concessions. Currently, Baseline is a major east–west street, and in the late 1990s it became so busy that Hunt Club Road had to be extended west of the Rideau River to alleviate pressure.

Points of interest on Baseline include the Queensway Carleton Hospital, the Boy Scouts Museum, Algonquin College and the Central Experimental Farm.

Baseline Road is a four-lane principal arterial road for its entire length, except between Centrepointe Drive and Navaho Drive, where it is a five-lane/six-lane arterial (three eastbound lanes and three westbound lanes – a bus lane is present from Constellation Drive west to Centrepointe in lieu of the third westbound lane). The speed limit is 60 km/h (37 mph) for most of its length except a short section west of Greenbank Road, where it is 70 km/h (43 mph).

Ramsayville Road in southeast Ottawa used to be called Base Line Road before 2003. The name had to be changed when the former city of Gloucester amalgamated with the city of Ottawa, to avoid confusion.

In the future, Baseline Road will have bus lanes between Navaho Drive and Prince of Wales Drive to speed up transit service in this stretch (OC Transpo bus route 88) due to consistent heavy traffic.

== Major intersections ==
- (Richmond Road / Robertson Road) & Highway 416 South
- Cedarview Road
- Valley Stream Drive & John Sutherland Drive (the latter provides access to Queensway Carleton Hospital)
- Sandcastle Drive
- Monterey Drive
- Morrison Avenue
- Guthrie Street
- Greenbank Road
- Centrepointe Drive & Cobden Road
- Centrepointe Drive & Highgate Road
- Woodroffe Avenue
- Navaho Drive
- Clyde Avenue
- Merivale Road
- Fisher Avenue
- Prince of Wales Drive (east of Prince of Wales, Baseline Road becomes Heron Road)
