= Carp Road =

Road in Ottawa, Canada

- Ottawa Road #5
- Maintained by: City of Ottawa
- Length: 43.6 km (27.1 mi)
- South end: Stittsville Main Street
- North end: Galetta Side Road

Carp Road (Ottawa Road #5) is an arterial road in Ottawa, Ontario, Canada that runs between Fitzroy Harbour and Stittsville, through the village of Carp. The road is located in the city's west end, beginning in Fitzroy Harbour at Galetta Side Road and ending in Stittsville at Stittsville Main Street. Most of the route is rural with the exception of Stittsville where the road travels in a residential development. Ottawa Regional Road #5 continues as Stittsville Main Street south of Carp Road, then becomes Huntley Road south of Stittsville toward the town of Richmond.

A curious artifact of pre-amalgamation Ottawa is the inconsistent numbering of addresses on Carp Road, divided at the intersection of Rothbourne Road, the boundary of the former townships of Goulbourn and West Carleton: Addresses begin at 1000 and run south toward Stittsville in Goulbourn, but begin at 2000 and run north toward Fitzroy Harbour in West Carleton.

Among notable landmarks along the road are:

- Carp Road Landfill run by Waste Management - 142 hectare facility with a 35 hectares landfill site
- Carp Fair - home to annual fall fair since 1863
- Irish Hills Golf and Country Club - a 9 and 18 hole course with banquet facilities
- Carp Airport - former military airfield (World War II British Commonwealth Air Training Plan field) and now private general aviation facility
- Diefenbunker former bomb shelter from the 1950s (closed 1994) and now Cold War museum
- Carp Hills - upland extension of the Canadian Shield running along Carp Road

== Major Intersections ==
From north to south:

- Galetta Side Road
- Kinburn Side Road
- Thomas A. Dolan Parkway
- Craig Side Road
- Donald B. Munro Drive
- March Road
- Highway 417
- Hazeldean Road
- Stittsville Main Street
