= Conroy Road =

Road in Ottawa, Ontario, Canada

Conroy Road is a secondary arterial road in the City of Ottawa, Ontario, Canada. It runs from Walkley Road in the north to Bank Street in the south. Conroy Road forms the eastern fringe of the neighbourhood of Blossom Park, Ontario and ends in the community of Kemp Park, Ontario. Conroy Road is home to Pine Grove Forest and the Conroy Pit (see Greenbelt), owned by the National Capital Commission. Conroy Road has recently expanded, and divided between Walkley Road and Hunt Club Road due to residential expansion in Ottawa's south end. The intersection of Conroy and Walkley may be the southern terminus of the controversial Alta Vista Parkway. Conroy Road is also known as Ottawa Road #125.

This road may be widened in the future due to rapid growth in the south end of the city. In this case, the whole route may be widened to 6 lanes including 2 HOV lanes between Walkley and Hunt Club and 4 lanes between Hunt Club and Bank Street. The speed limit is 60 km/h (37 mph) between Walkley and Hunt Club and 70 km/h (43 mph) between Hunt Club and Bank.
