= List of county roads in Ontario =

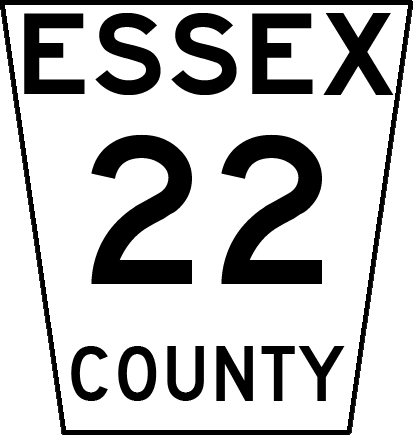
Sample route sign for an Ontario county road

This is a list of county and regional (collectively known as divisions) numbered roads in Ontario. These roads are found only in Southern Ontario (with the lone exception being Greater Sudbury, which is in Northern Ontario), and are listed alphabetically by county, because more than one county can sometimes have the same county road number without connecting across county lines.

By their nature, all county roads in Ontario are numbered, unless noted. This page lists all of the county/district/regional roads by their respective county, district, or regional municipality.

Some counties have been merged in the past, and are known as "United Counties". They will be treated and named as one county.

The county road network has been present for many years, but has only been signed with the flowerpot logos since the early 1970s or 1980s (depending on the area). The signs are usually black text on white, or in some counties are multi-coloured. Previously, the roads simply had road names, such as "Essex Road 42" or "Kent County Road 14", and so on, but had no shields to designate them.

County roads within still-extant counties are almost always rural routes and rarely run through towns. However, within regional municipalities, the systems were expanded to follow major streets in the formerly separated cities, or were retained within originally-rural townships that were incorporated as cities following mass suburbanization.

In addition to County Roads, many townships also have Concession roads and Township Roads, such as Colchester South Road 3, and Concession 8. These do not have shields (only names on signs and maps). Some exceptions include former Highway 38 in Eastern Ontario, where the township name appears instead of the county as the township administers the road, or is not signed at all. Former Secondary Highway 620, downloaded to the Peterborough and Hastings County governments, was downloaded further to Wollaston Township (in Hastings County), with a posted sign appearing similar to an Ontario Tertiary Highway.

== Glossary ==
- CR = County Road (or City Road for those counties that have become City of name County, (such as the City of Prince Edward County) or amalgamated former regions such as Ottawa-Carleton (the present City of Ottawa) where such roads form a subset of the present municipal street network).
- DR = District Road (only in Muskoka; similar routes in unincorporated districts are usually provincial Secondary or Tertiary Highways)
- MR = Municipal Road (for Single-Tier Municipalities)
- RR = Regional Road (Not Rural Route)
- CH = County Highway - some counties have the same number designation for two or more County Routes, but some (like Durham RM and the City of Norfolk County) also list routes as County Highways (CR HWY/RR HWY/DR HWY), abbreviated as CH. These are designations for downloaded former provincial highways. A prime example is Durham RR 2, and Durham RR HWY 2.

== Counties ==
=== Essex County ===
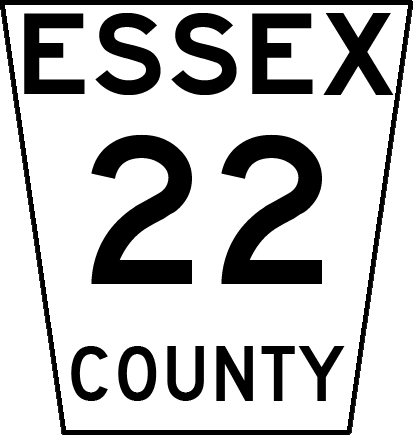

=== Simcoe County ===
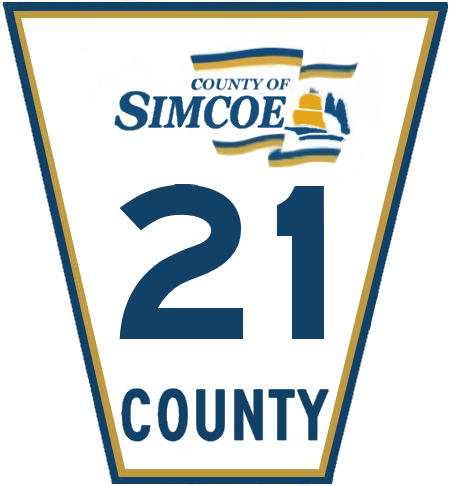

== Regional/District Municipalities ==
=== Regional Municipality of Niagara ===
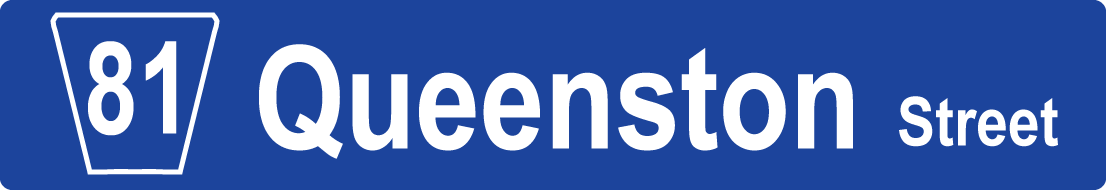

=== Regional Municipality of Peel ===
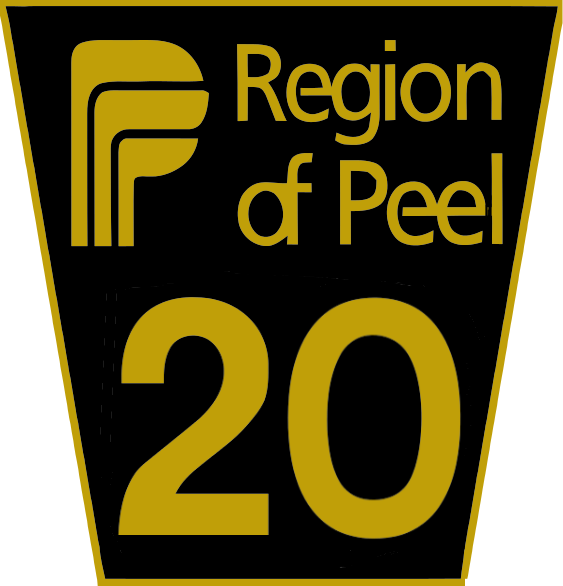

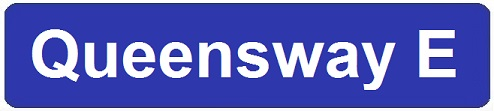

Main Articles:
- List of numbered roads in Peel Region
- List of roads in Brampton (includes non-numbered Brampton roads)
- List of roads in Mississauga (includes non-numbered Mississauga roads)

=== Regional Municipality of York ===

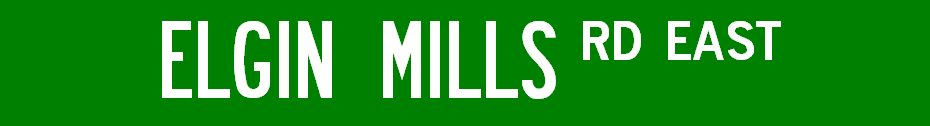

== Single-tier municipalities ==
=== Greater Sudbury ===
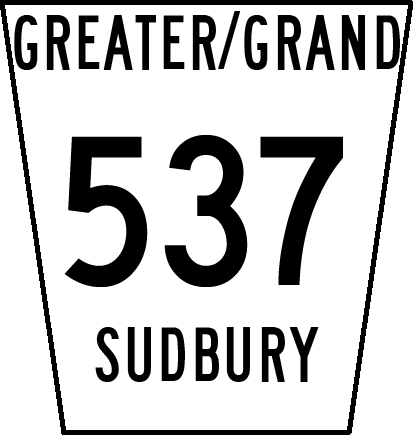

=== Ottawa ===
Main Articles:
- List of numbered roads in Ottawa
- List of roads in Ottawa (includes non-numbered Ottawa roads)

=== Toronto ===
Main Articles:
- Metro Toronto Roads and Transportation (the present City of Toronto was formerly Metropolitan Toronto; a regional-level of government that maintained a non-numbered system of major roads)
- List of east-west roads in Toronto
- List of diagonal roads in Toronto
- List of north-south roads in Toronto
