= Walkley Road =

Street in Ottawa, Canada

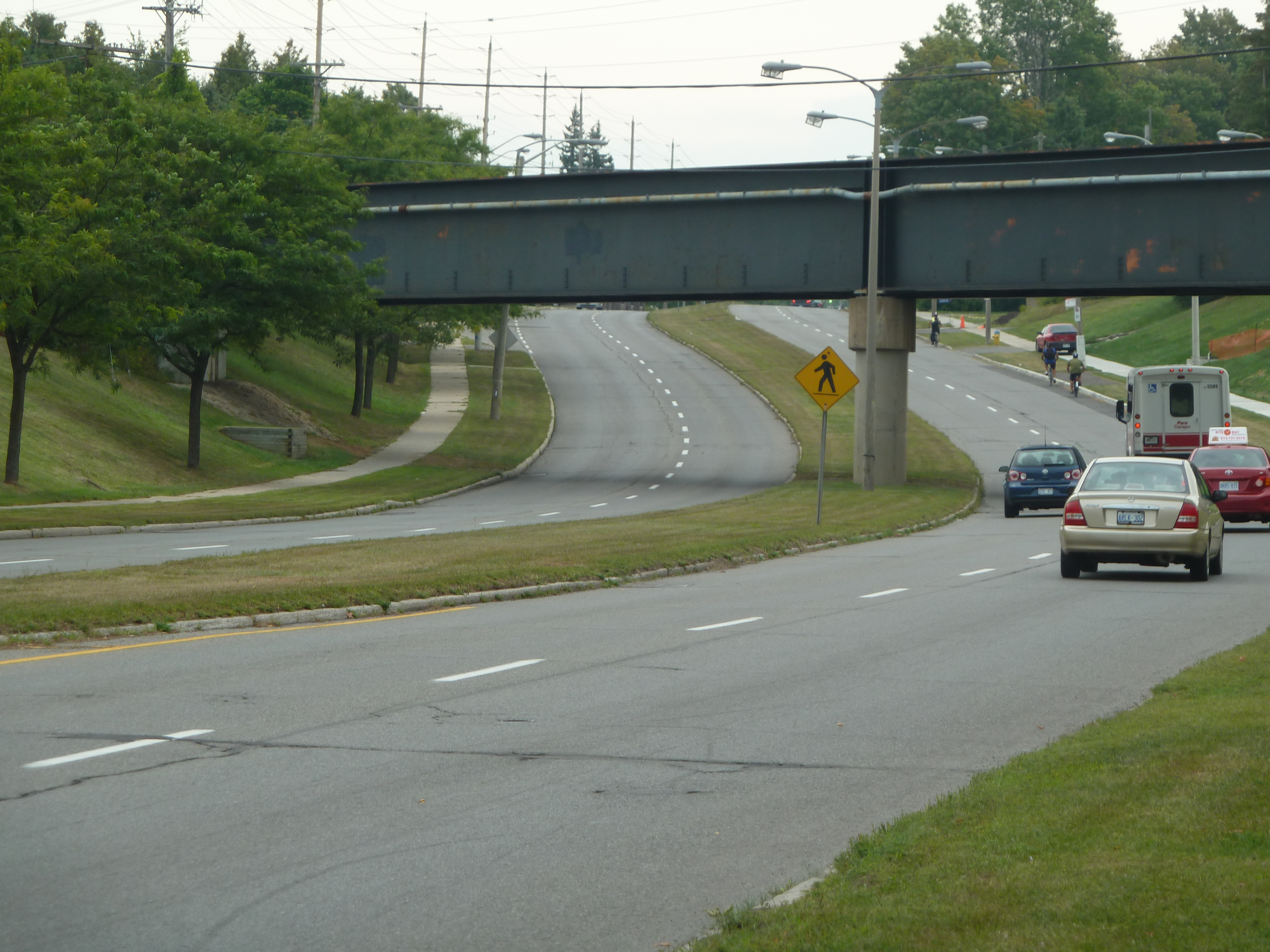
Walkley Road looking east going under the Via Rail bridge

Walkley Road (Ottawa Road #74) is a major road in Ottawa, Ontario, Canada. It runs from Riverside Drive to Ramsayville Road (formerly Baseline Road). It is mostly a four-lane divided road which runs through both residential and industrial areas of the southern part of urban Ottawa. The majority of the road from Riverside Drive to Russell Road has a 50 km/h (31 mph) speed limit, passing through neighbourhoods like Riverside Park, Ledbury-Herongate-Ridgemont-Ellwood, and Urbandale. From Russell Road to the turn where it becomes Ramsayville Road, the speed limit is 80 km/h (50 mph).

== See also ==
- List of roads in Ottawa
