= Dwyer Hill Road =

Road in Ottawa, Canada

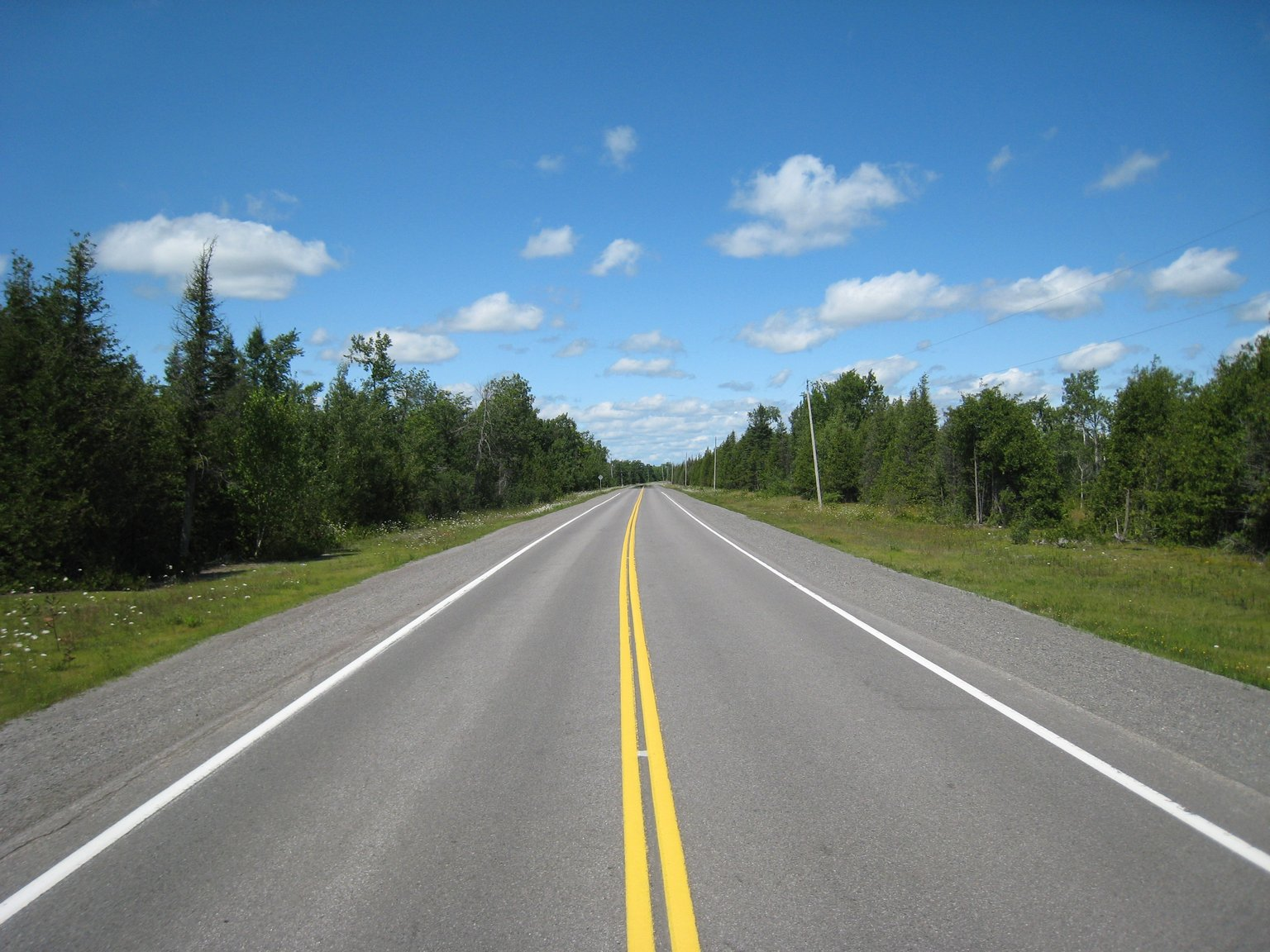
Dwyer Hill Road near Burrits Rapids

Dwyer Hill Road (Ottawa Road #3) is the longest road within the municipal jurisdiction of the city of Ottawa, Ontario, Canada.

The road runs parallel to the city's western border at a distance of about 3-4 kilometres from it. The road runs from the community of Burritts Rapids on the Rideau River north to the city's limits with the town of Arnprior. On its way, it passes through the communities of Dwyer Hill and Panmure. Dwyer Hill Road travels through rural surroundings for its entire length.

North of its crossing point with Highway 7, the road is known as Upper Dwyer Hill Road. South of its junction with Kinburn Sideroad, the road is numbered as Ottawa Road #3. In total, the road is about 70 km (43 mi) long, edging out both the Queensway and Bank Street for the title of longest road in the city. Dwyer Hill Road is the longest road entirely within one municipality in the world.

== Sources ==
- MapArt Ontario Road Atlas
