= Dwyer Hill, Ottawa =

Rural community within city of Ottawa, Ontario, Canada

Coordinates: 45°07′31″N 75°56′48″W

Dwyer Hill is a farming community in Rideau-Jock Ward, Ottawa, Ontario, Canada.

It is the headquarters for Joint Task Force 2.

== Location ==
Located approximately 50 km southwest of downtown Ottawa and 30 km northeast of Smiths Falls, the community is centred on the intersection of Dwyer Hill Road (Route #3) and Franktown Road (Route #10).

Anderson Farm is on the corner of Franktown Rd. and Dwyer Hill Rd and been there since 1837. It is now owned and operated by Robert and Brenda Anderson.

Kings Creek joins the Jock River just east of the community.

Dwyer Hill is also a railway point marked by a signpost on the VIA Rail line between Ottawa station and Smiths Falls station.
