= Fourth Line Road =

Road in Canada

- Ottawa Road 5

Major junctions
- South end: Rideau River
- North end: Brophy Drive

Location
- Major cities: North Gower, Richmond

Fourth Line Road, (Ottawa Road #5) is a designated arterial road in the rural portion of Ottawa, Ontario, Canada. Fourth Line Road passes through the heart of North Gower, Ontario, known as "Main Street" locally.

The street follows one of the meridian lines first laid out when Carleton County was surveyed. It begins southeast of Richmond, Ontario at Brophy Drive, and runs southeast until it hits the Rideau River, where it turns into Donnelly Drive at Reevecraig Road South.

The road runs just to the west of Highway 416, which is the more important north-south route. The southern portion of it was originally part of Ontario Highway 16.
