= Mitch Owens Road =

Street in Ottawa, Canada

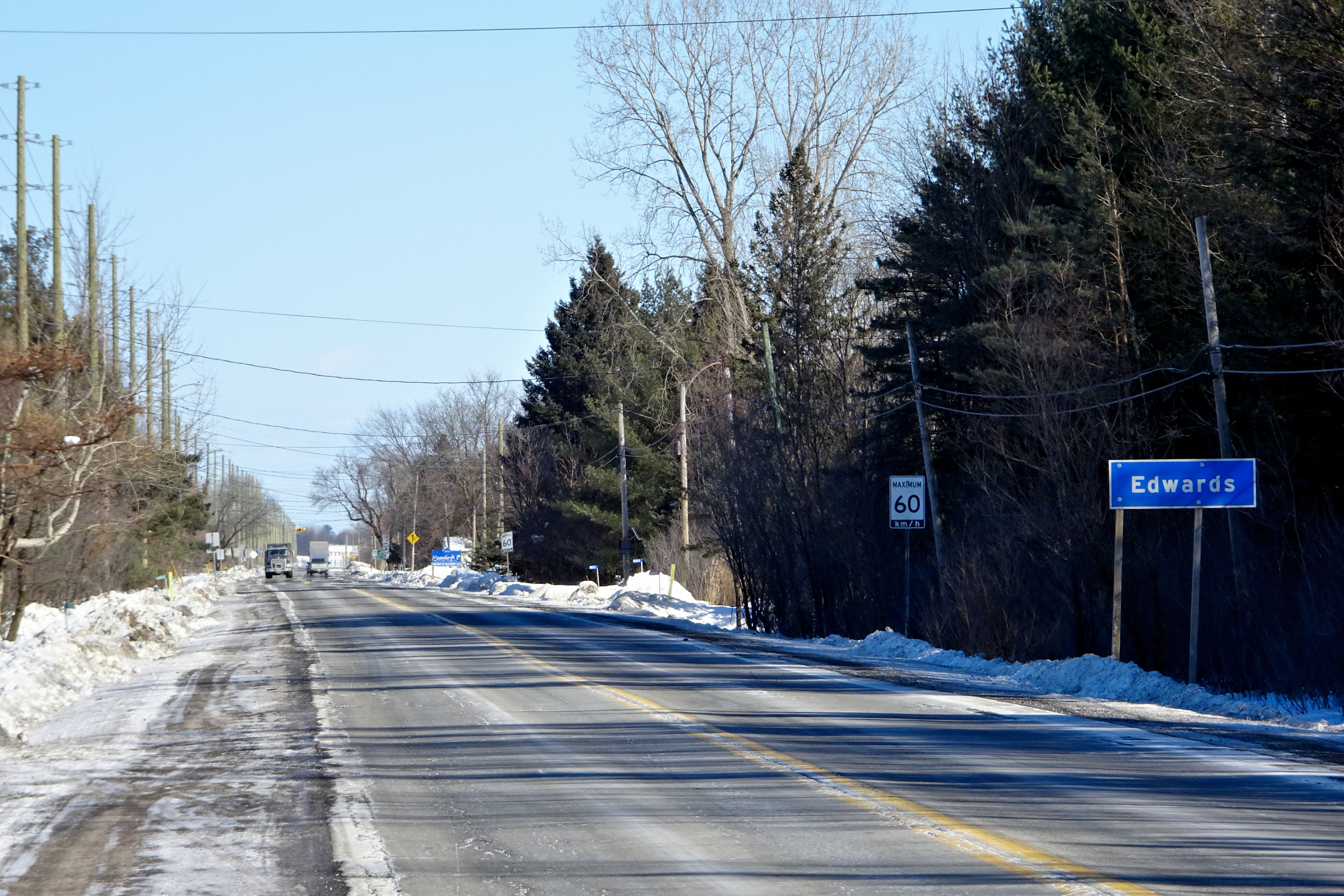
Mitch Owens Road at Edwards

Mitch Owens Road (Ottawa Road #8) runs along the border primarily of the former city of Gloucester and Osgoode Township. It was named for former Gloucester mayor Mitch Owens.

It runs from Manotick to Highway 417 in Vars. The speed limit is typically 80 km/h (50 mph) although in certain sections it can be as low as 50 km/h (31 mph).
