= Merivale Road =

Road in Ottawa, Ontario, Canada

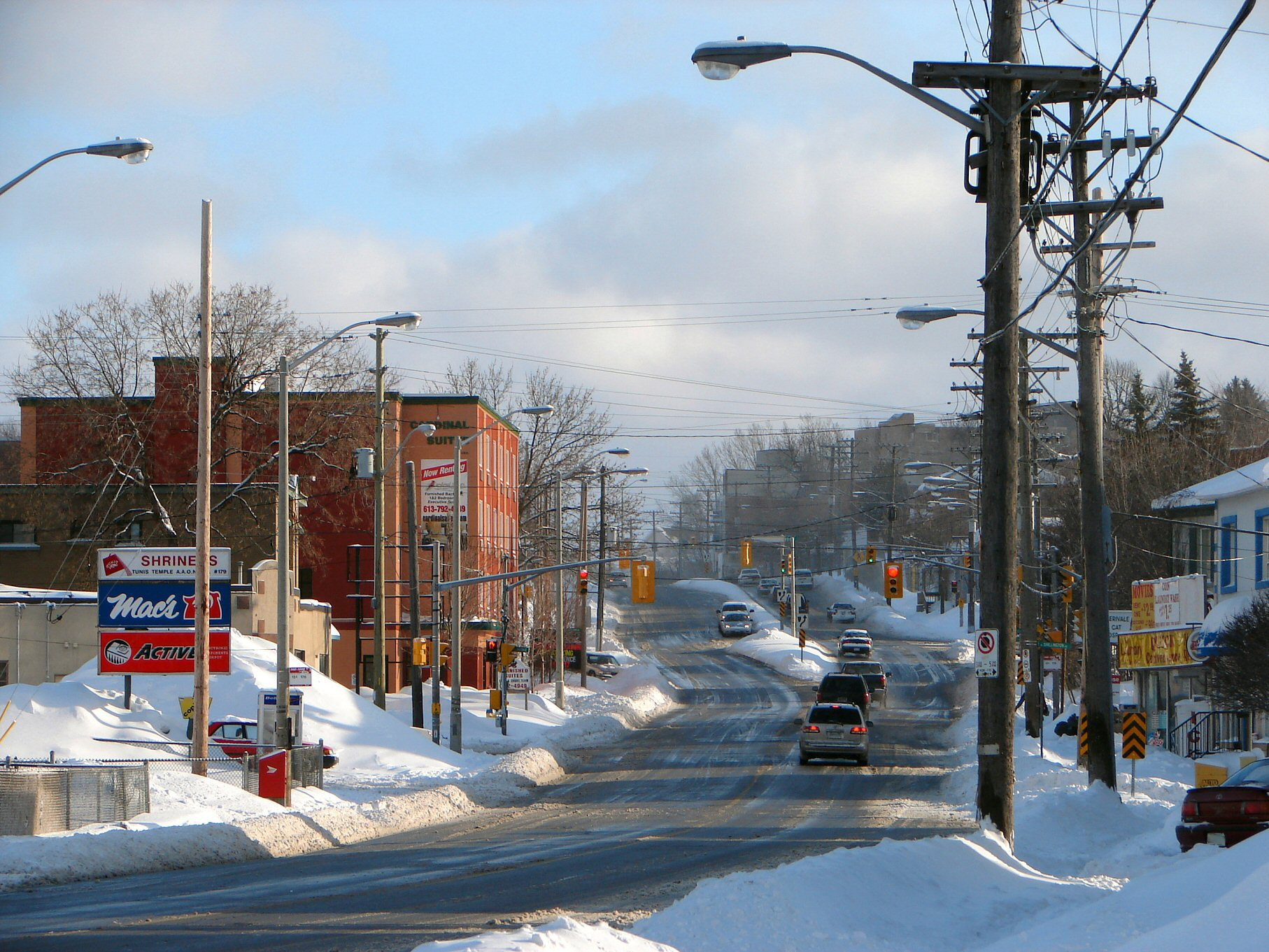
Merivale Road near Kirkwood Avenue looking south. The steep drop of the eastern end of the southern Ottawa escarpment can be seen here as the road approaches the Ottawa River.

Merivale Road is an arterial road in the west end of Ottawa, Ontario, Canada. It starts at Island Park Drive just north of Highway 417 and continues south until it ends at Prince of Wales Drive in Rideau Glen. South of Clyde Avenue, Merivale is known as Ottawa Road #17, while north of Clyde it is Ottawa Road #63.

Merivale Road is a major commercial corridor. In the early 2020s, the road became home to many businesses catering to Indian immigrants as Ottawa's South Asian population surged.

Ottawa's Transportation Master Plan calls for bus lanes to be added to the road with the date of implementation to be determined.
