= Heron Road (Ottawa) =

Street in Ottawa, Canada

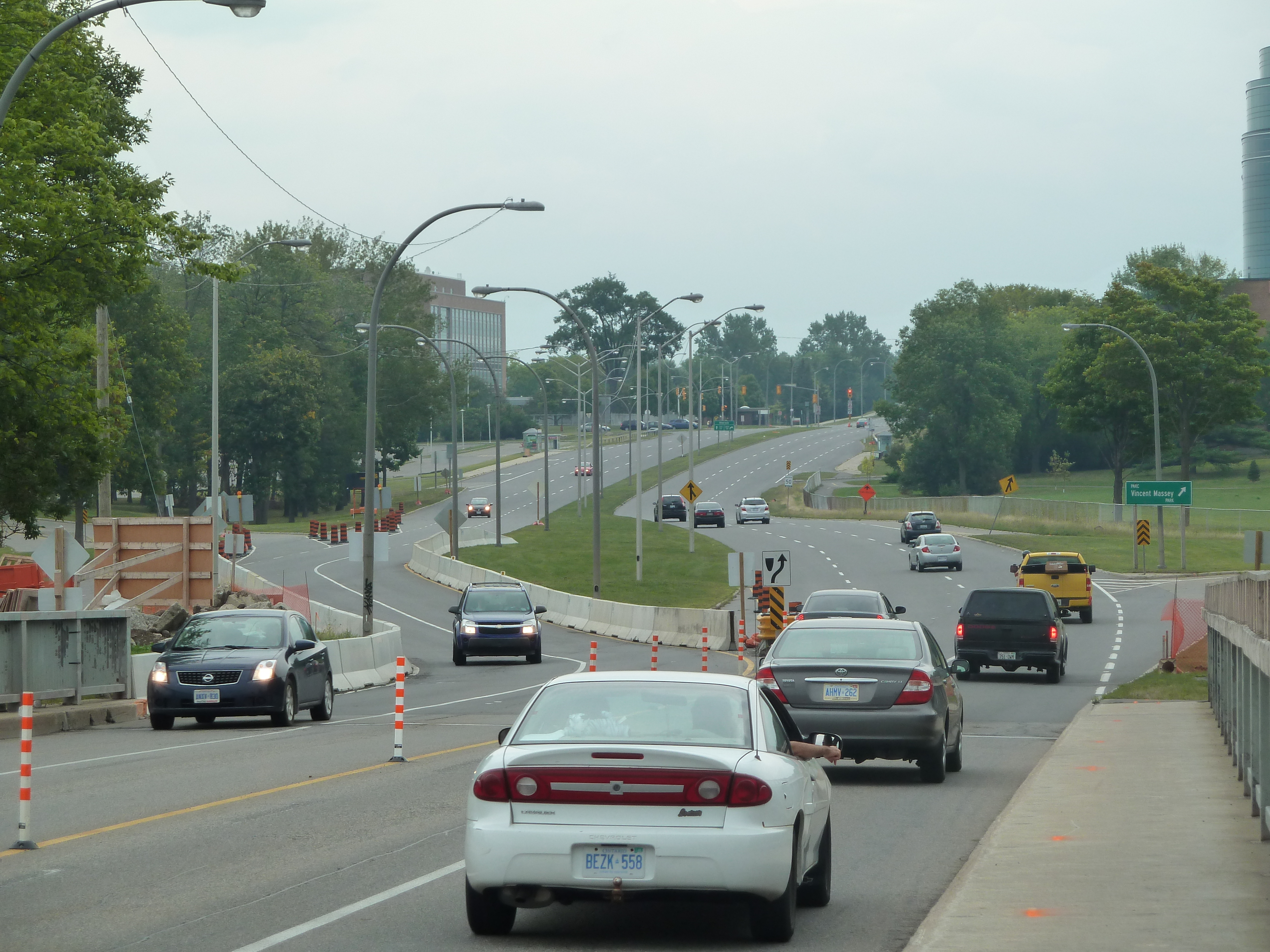
Heron Road looking east from the Heron Road Bridge

Heron Road (Ottawa Road #16) is a major road in Ottawa, Ontario, Canada. It runs from Walkley Road at an angle to the Rideau River, where it turns into Baseline Road. Heron is home to the Sir Leonard Tilley Building, the Canada Post headquarters, and 1500 Bronson Avenue (at its junction with Riverside Drive). It is also home to St. Patrick's Intermediate High School and Herongate Mall.

Heron Road starts on the Heron Road Bridge which crosses the Rideau River, Rideau Canal, and part of Vincent Massey Park. From there, most of Heron Road is a four- to six-lane divided principal arterial, and often becomes a speed trap; the speed limit is 60 km/h (37 mph) west of Bank Street and 50 km/h (31 mph) east of Bank Street despite the overall lack of pedestrians and relatively free flow (especially west of Bronson Avenue).
