= Ottawa Electric Railway =

Streetcar system in Ontario, Canada (1891–1959)

Coordinates: 45.42451°N 75.694817°W

Ottawa Electric Railway Company was a streetcar public transit system in the city of Ottawa, Canada, part of the electric railway streetcars that operated between 1891 and 1959. Ottawa once had tracks through downtown on Rideau Street, Sparks Street and others, and extended outside of the downtown core to provide services that helped form communities such as Westboro, Old Ottawa South and The Glebe. Prior to this, starting in 1866, public transportation was provided by Ottawa City Passenger Railway Company, a horse-drawn tram service. The O.E.R. was taken over by the Ottawa Transportation Commission in 1948, which was itself succeeded by OC Transpo in 1973.

== History ==
=== Ottawa City Passenger Railway Company ===
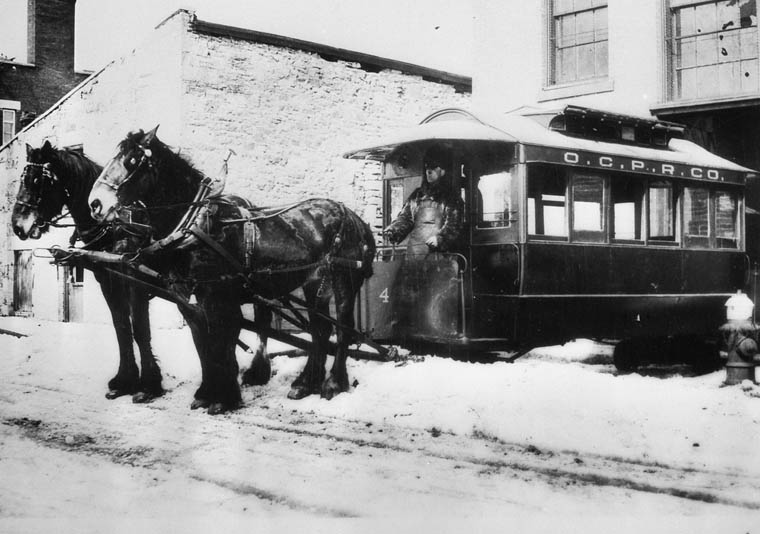
Ottawa City Passenger Railway Company Ottawa circa. 1871, Horse drawn streetcar

Preceding the use of electric streetcars, Ottawa's first public transportation system was the operation of a horsecar system. Tramway service began in July 1870. under the Ottawa City Passenger Railway Company, which was incorporated on August 15, 1866.

The O.C.P.R. was financed largely by the estate of Thomas McKay (an early founder of Ottawa). In 1868, Thomas Reynolds bought control of the company intending to use it to transport lumber at night from the Chaudiere mills to McTaggart Street, the terminal of the St. Lawrence and Ottawa Railway. In 1871, Reynolds sold his streetcar company interest to Thomas Keifer.

The horse-drawn streetcars travelled back and forth from New Edinburgh to the Chaudière Bridge. The trams for passengers and freight had a line extending from Rideau Falls in New Edinburgh, to Sussex, Sparks, Wellington, Duke (in Lebreton Flats) and the Suspension Bridge. The service provided sleighs in the winter and had 273,000 passengers in its first year of operation. In 1891, it had four miles (6.4 km) of track, 25 horses and 15 employees.

The Ottawa City Passenger Railway Company had tram cars holding 20 passengers which were made of wood with bench seats. The company applied to the city to convert to electricity but was refused, and later it proposed a merger of two companies.

A new company, Ottawa Electric Railway Company, would appear on the scene in the early 1890s and would later dominate public transportation in Ottawa.

=== Electricity in Ottawa ===
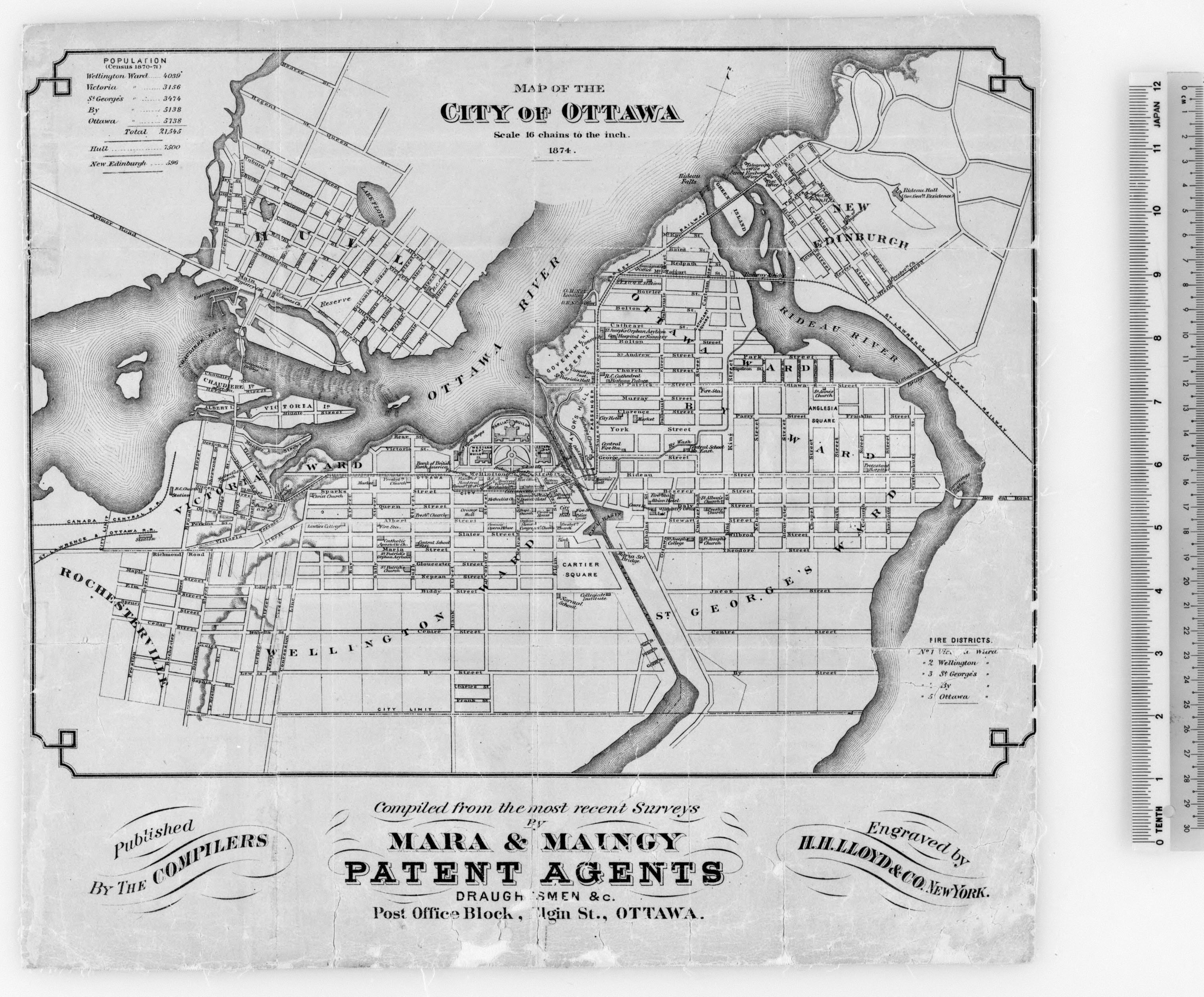
First streetcar route, Ottawa map 1874; Route along Sussex, Sparks, Wellington to Chaudiere Falls

Ottawa's first electric lights operated near the Chaudière Falls in 1882, and in 1885, electric lighting came to the city streets under Ottawa Electric Light Company.

Thomas Ahearn, born in LeBreton Flats, also became an important figure in the early years of electricity in Ottawa. Ahearn had been a telegraph operator, and in 1892 filed patents for both an "electric oven" and a "system of warming cars by means of electrically heated water". Ahearn formed a partnership with Warren Y. Soper, and for years the office of Ahearn and Soper was on Sparks Street. Ahearn merged existing companies (Clemow's) Ottawa Electric Light Company, and Ahearn's company, Chaudière Electric Light and Power Company, with a third company, naming it Ottawa Electric Company. It became part of Ahearn's Ottawa Light, Heat and Power Company, which eventually was taken over by Ottawa Hydro.

In 1901, Ottawa Electric Railway Company built a 2,000-foot (610 m) canal just north of the Britannia Boathouse Club to generate Hydroelectric power on the Deschênes Rapids. Although the hydroelectric project was abandoned as unfeasible, the unfinished canal was used in 1951 by Past Commodores Thomas G. Fuller and Reginald G. Bruce with labour provided by volunteer Club members as the basis of the Britannia Yacht Club's protected harbour. Today, the main and inner harbour provide 250 wet moorings, fuel and pumpout facilities, for both sail and power boats.

=== Ottawa Electric Railway Company ===
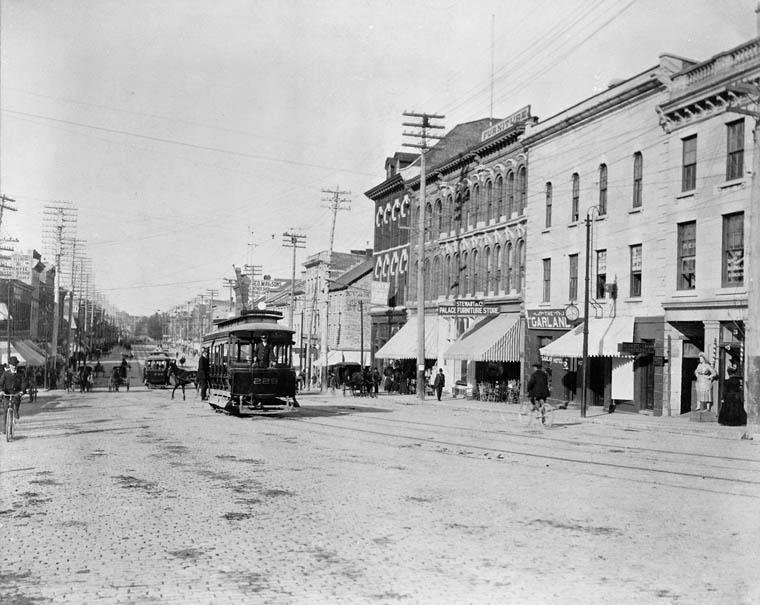
36 Rideau Street looking east, 1898

The horsecar was providing public transportation for Ottawa into the 1890s when, for a short time, electric streetcars were also employed. Initially Thomas Ahearn's new company started streetcar operations until it was merged with the existing horsecar company, and in the process, it was renamed to the Ottawa Electric Railway Company.

In 1890 former Mayor Howland of Toronto offered to provide Ottawa with an electric streetcar service. He backed out and Ahearn stepped in, and he along with Soper petitioned the city in order to obtain the franchise. They succeeded, and got granted a 20-year charter for on November 5, 1890, city council gave them permission to operate an electric railway. They formed a company on February 13, 1891 called the Ottawa Electric Street Railway Company(sic).

On June 25, 1891 the first electric street cars began operation in a display of five (four on June 29) streetcars with Ahearn and Soper as drivers. Mayor Thomas Birkett was aboard, as well as some dignitaries and they ran to the exhibition grounds on Bank Street.

The Ottawa City Passenger Railway Company was amalgamated with the Ottawa Electric Street Railway Company in 1893. The merger took place resulting in the formation of a new company; on June 28 the Ottawa Electric Railway Company was incorporated. O.E.R. purchased W. W. Wylie Carriage Works in 1893 and started making its own cars. Patterson and Corbin of St. Catharines provided ten trams. In the winter, some of the fleet was equipped with plows and rotating brushes to clear the track. In 1893 three cars had heaters. Later models were equipped with underfloor heaters; the first heated tramcars on the continent. This company operated in conjunction with the Ottawa Transportation Company, which was granted a charter in 1892 (which would last until February 21, 1942.)

Its first tracks started from Broad Street Station (in LeBreton Flats) to Albert and Metcalfe, then to the exhibition grounds via Bank Street, to the Protestant Hospital at Charlotte and Rideau, to Wellington and Rideau, the Canada Atlantic Station at the end of Elgin to Sparks and Metcalfe. Street cars allowed access to areas such as Britannia Park, Rockliffe Park and Queen's Park in Aylmer.

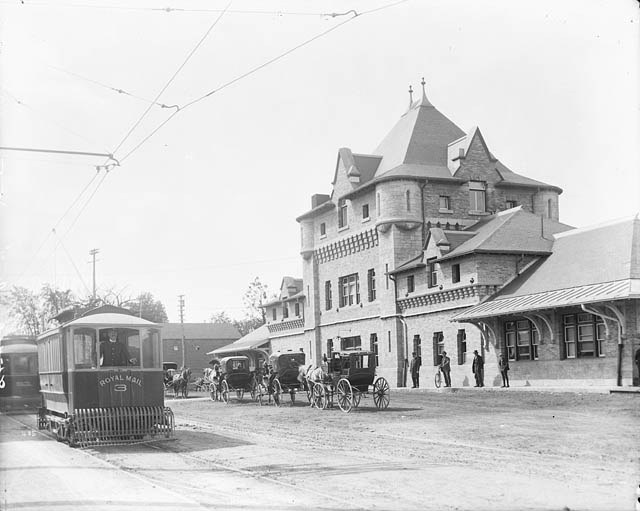
Broad Street Station, Lebreton Flats; royal mail streetcar (likely early 1900s)

In the city's first eleven months of electric streetcar service, it had a ridership of 1.5 million, whereas the horse tramway had 575,000. The city agreed to a 30-year electric railway in 1893 following which the horse tramways disappeared. The city for years renewed the charter rather than exercising its right to purchase the company's property.

By 1900, Ottawa Electric Railway had a double-tracked line to Britannia Bay. Sunday service started in 1900 despite strong protests from citizens wanting to maintain the Sunday as a Sabbath Day. The Alexandra Bridge opened for traffic on February 22, 1901 by the Ottawa Northern and Western Railway Company to bring service from Waltham and Maniwaki After the Alexandra Bridge was built, it was employed with the O.E.R. The Alexandra Bridge had a single track for steam trains, and two tracks for electric trams and two roadways for cars and two footpaths.

In 1924, fares were five cents; 3 cents for children. The O.E.R. introduced buses in 1924, but they were removed, only returning in 1939 (for a service between Elgin and Ottawa East). In August 1948, city council finally agreed to purchase the company's assets. The city bought the O.E.R. for $6.3 million in 1950. The Ottawa Transportation Commission was set up to operate it, and 54 million passengers rode in 1950.

By 1958 financial problems of the O.T.C. caused a study to be conducted by Urwick, Currie Ltd. In March 1958, they acknowledged the 96 aging cars and recommended diesel buses. The Ottawa Transportation Commission began implementing the plan and removed the cars; the last electric car ran on May 1, 1959 when the Britannia line was closed. A parade was held on May 4 celebrating an end to 68 years of tram service in Ottawa. The O.T.C. was succeeded by OC Transpo in 1973.

== Fleet ==
Model	Year	Fleet Number(s)	Number in Fleet	Transmission	Notes
Ottawa Car Company 500 Series	1911	650	1	?	DTSE 2-man wood car. Acquired by the Ottawa Transportation Commission in 1948.
Ottawa Car Company 600 Series	1913	651-656, 658-666, 668-669 and 680-682	20	?	DTSE 1 or 2-man steel cars. Acquired by the Ottawa Transportation Commission in 1948.
Ottawa Car Company 600 Series	1915	683-686, 688-690 and 693-695	10	?	DTSE 1 or 2-man steel cars. Acquired by the Ottawa Transportation Commission in 1948.
Ottawa Car Company 600 Series	1917	691-692 and 696	3	?	DTSE 1 or 2-man steel cars. Acquired by the Ottawa Transportation Commission in 1948.
Ottawa Car Company 800 Series	1924-1925	800-821	2	?	DTSE 1 or 2-man steel cars. Acquired by the Ottawa Transportation Commission in 1948.
Ottawa Car Company 800 Series	1926	822-843	22	?	DTSE 1 or 2-man steel cars. Acquired by the Ottawa Transportation Commission in 1948.
Ottawa Car Company 800 Series	1927	850-869 and 880-881	22	?	DTSE 1 or 2-man steel cars. Acquired by the Ottawa Transportation Commission in 1948.
Ottawa Car Company 900 Series	1933	901-906 and 908-910	9	?	DTSE 1-man steel cars. Acquired by the Ottawa Transportation Commission in 1948.
Ottawa Car Company 900 Series	1934	911-916 and 918-923	12	?	DTSE 1-man steel cars. Acquired by the Ottawa Transportation Commission in 1948.
Mack CW	1939	121-126	6	?	Acquired by the Ottawa Transportation Commission in 1948.
Toronto Railway Company / TTC Class BB	1908-1911 and/or 1911-1913	?-?	10	?	Acquired during WWII from TTC as converted (1927-1932) SEDT PAYE Class B cars.
Mack CW	1940	128	1	?	Acquired by the Ottawa Transportation Commission in 1948.
Ford 09B	1940	151-156 and 158-161	10	?	Acquired by the Ottawa Transportation Commission in 1948.
Mack LD	1941	130-136 and 138-140	10	?	Acquired by the Ottawa Transportation Commission in 1948.
CC&F C-36	1946	201-206, 208-216 and 218-222	20	?	Acquired by the Ottawa Transportation Commission in 1948.
CC&F IC-41	1946	300	1	?	Acquired by the Ottawa Transportation Commission in 1948.
Ottawa Car Company 1000 Series	1947	1000-1003	4	?	DTSE Closed 1-man steel cars. Acquired by the Ottawa Transportation Commission in 1948.

=== Gallery ===
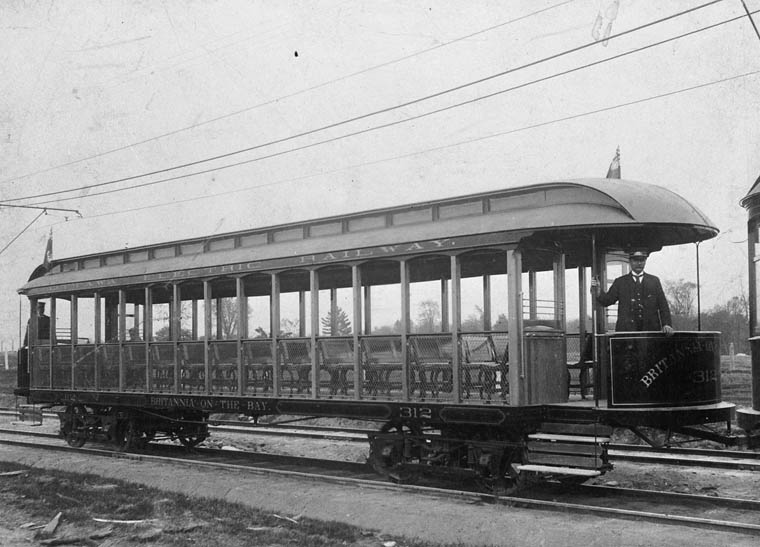
Ottawa Electric Railway "scenic car", c1871-1900

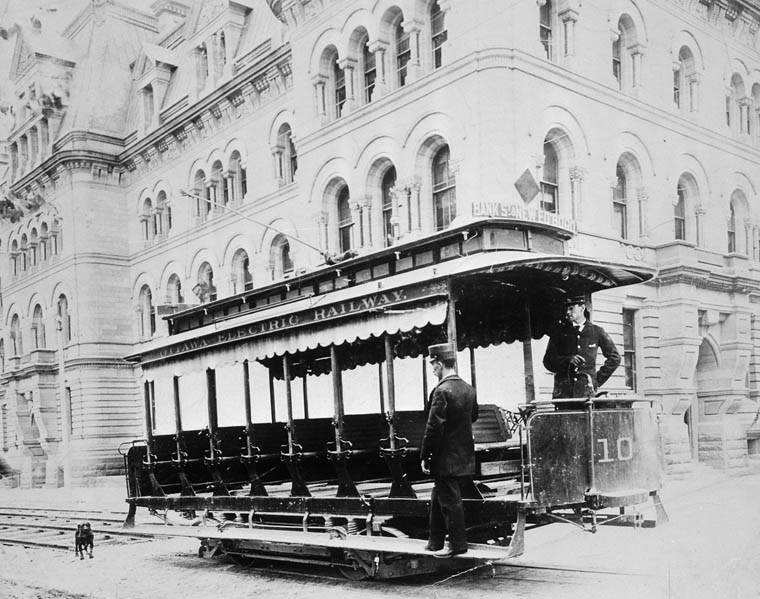
Wellington Street by the Langevin Block, c1900

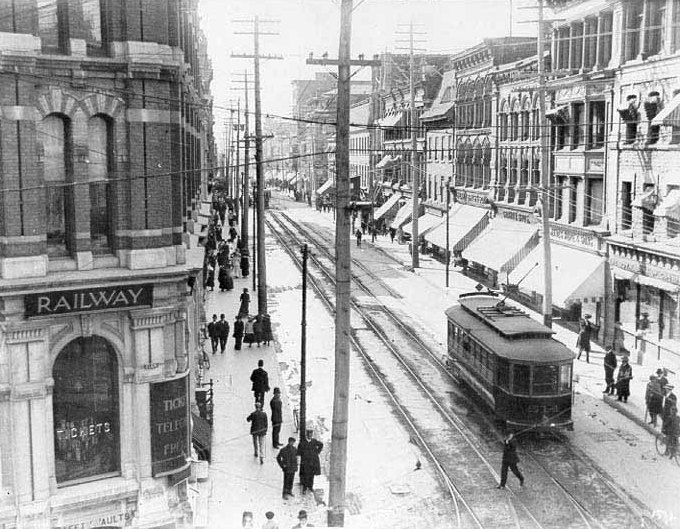
Sparks Street at Elgin looking west, c1909

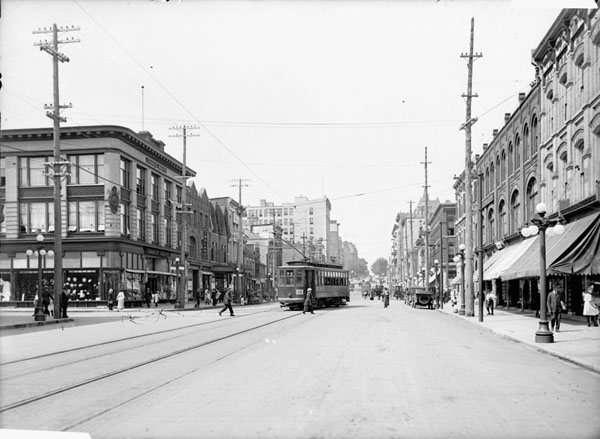
Rideau Street looking west, c1920

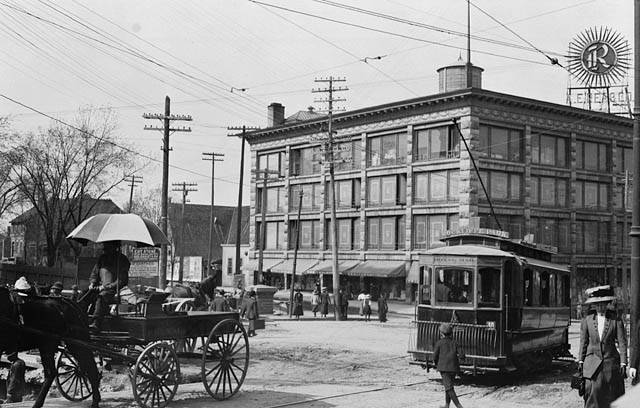
Daly Building on Rideau Street - Streetcar says "Rockcliffe Park", c1912

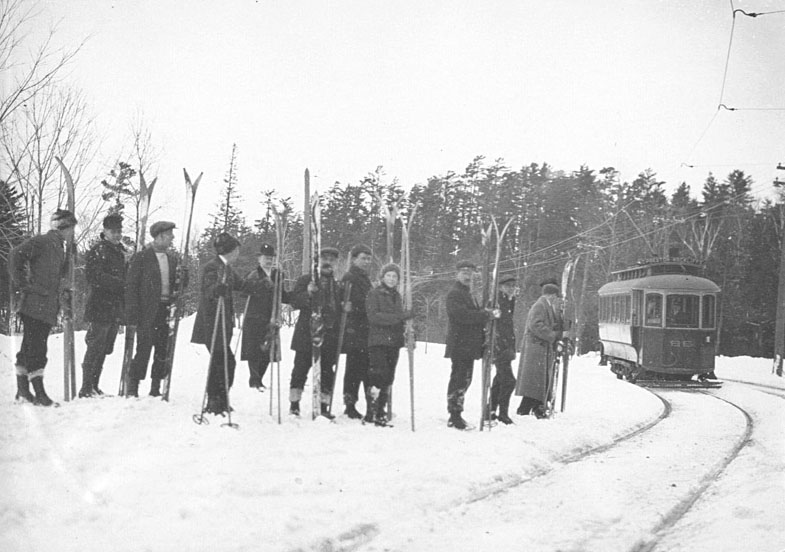
Skiers waiting for the streetcar, Rockliffe Park, c1913

== See also ==
- C. T. Bate president of the Ottawa Electric Street Company.
- E. A. Bourque squired the purchase of the Ottawa Electric Railway, that became Ottawa Transportation Commission.
- Henry Herbert Horsey a director of Ottawa Light, Heat and Power Company and the Ottawa Electric Railway Company.
- Line 1 (O-Train)
- Line 2 (O-Train)
- List of street railways in Canada
- Lornado, home of Warren Y. Soper, it is still there, and is now the US Ambassador's home.
- OC Transpo
- O-Train
- Ottawa Car Company
- Ottawa Transportation Commission
- Robert Blackburn (politician) helped establish the Ottawa City Passenger Railway Company.
- The Glebe A community which grew from this streetcar line.
- Thomas Ahearn founder and president of the Ottawa Electric Railway Company, founded Ahearn & Soper.
- Vimy House Ottawa's streetcar garage is still there near the Canadian War Museum.
- Westboro A community which grew from this streetcar line.
- William Goodhue Perley helped establish the Ottawa City Passenger Railway Company.
- William H. Hutchison director of the Chaudiere Electric Light Company, the Ottawa City Passenger Railway Company, the Ottawa Electric Railway Company.
- List of Ontario railways
- List of defunct Canadian railways
