= Ottawa Car Company =

Rolling stock manufacturer

- Company type: Subsidiary
- Industry: Rail transport
- Founded: 1891; 135 years ago
- Defunct: 1948
- Headquarters: Ottawa, Canada
- Area served: Worldwide
- Products: Streetcars; Interurbans; Aircraft (in later years)
- Parent: Ottawa Electric Railway

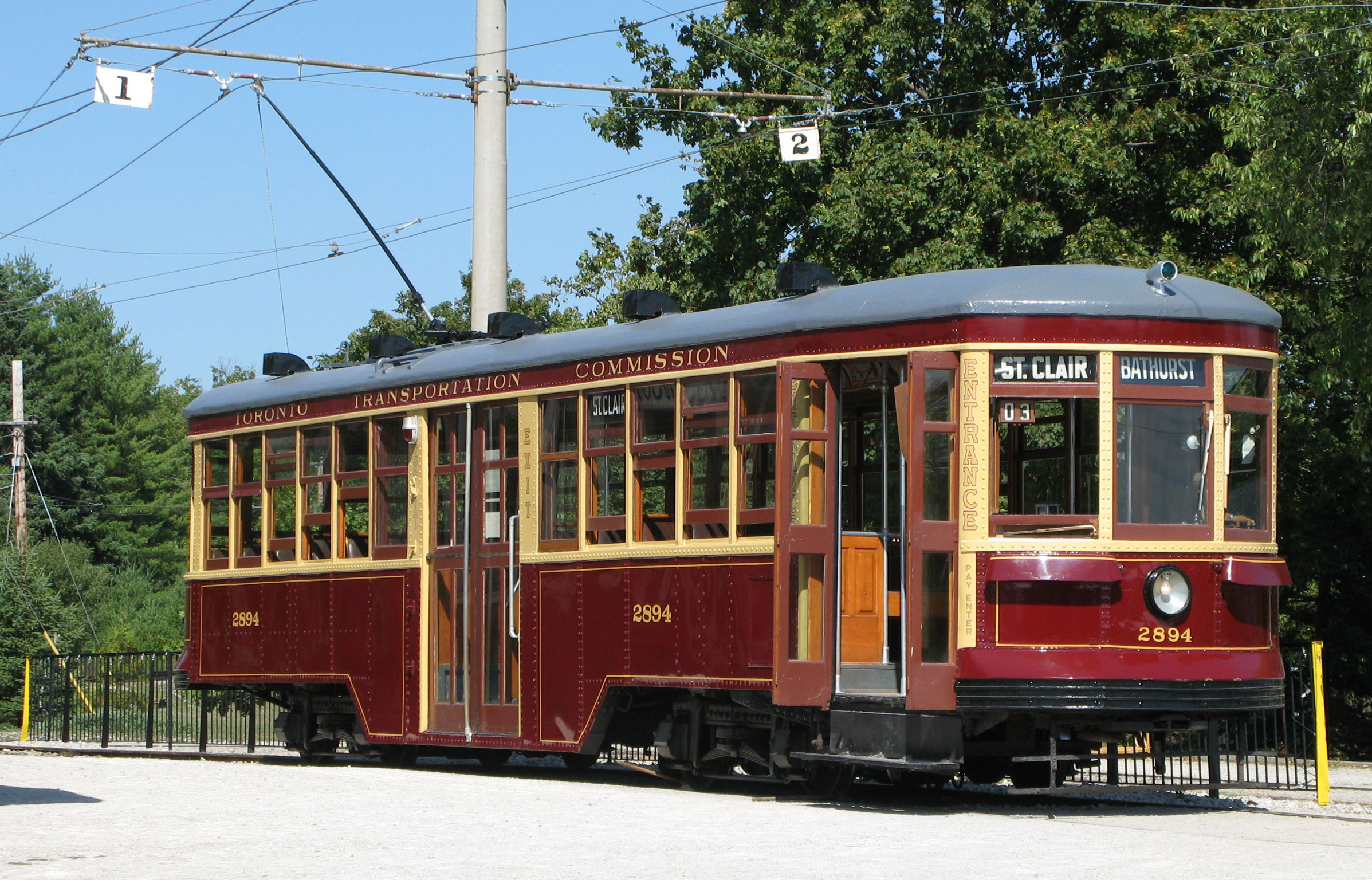
A streetcar built by the Ottawa Car Company for the Toronto system

The Ottawa Car Company was a builder of streetcars for the Canadian market and was founded in Ottawa, Ontario, in 1891 as an outgrowth of the carriage building operations of William W. Wylie. Its plant was located at Kent and Slater Streets (south side of Slater between Kent and Lyon Streets - now site of Constitution Square), a short distance from Parliament Hill. The company was a subsidiary of Ottawa Electric Railway, in turn controlled by Ahearn & Soper.

It was renamed Ottawa Car Manufacturing Company in 1917 and again as Ottawa Car and Aircraft Limited in 1937.

The Ahearn family retained control of the company until 1948 when they sold Ottawa Car & Aircraft Corporation (renamed during World War II) to the Mailman Corporation. The new owners never carried on the business and ceased operations as streetcars were being abandoned by cities across North America. The city of Ottawa abandoned its own streetcar network in 1959. The company produced a total of about 1700 vehicles.

On 19 August 1994 Canada Post issued 88¢ stamps featuring Ottawa Car Company Streetcar, 1894, Saint John Railway Co. Car #40.

== Products ==
Streetcars

- Small Peter Witt streetcars
- Snow sweepers
- Interurban railcars:
  - 8 R Class radial cars for Toronto and York Radial Railway on the Mimico line then transferred to Toronto Transportation Commission for use by North Yonge Railways
- Single End Double Truck streetcar

Aircraft

- produced Armstrong Whitworth Atlas and Armstrong Whitworth Siskin fighters for Armstrong Whitworth
- produced Avro Tutor and Avro Prefect trainers for Avro
- Armstrong Siddeley engines
- Aircraft parts for World War II: Handley Page Hampden bombers, Hawker Hurricanes and Avro Ansons
- bomb doors, flaps, ailerons, and elevators for Avro Lancaster bombers

== Clients ==
- Edmonton Radial Railway
- Toronto Transportation Commission
- Ottawa Transportation Commission (Ottawa Electric Railway)
- Hamilton Street Railway (Hamilton Radial Electric Railway)
- Winnipeg Transit
- Montreal Street Railway
- South Western Traction Company/London & Lake Erie Railway
- Windsor, Essex and Lake Shore Rapid Railway
- London Street Railway
- Montreal Tramways Company
- Saskatoon Municipal Railway

== Preservation ==
Operator	Number	Type	Museum	Location	Status
Toronto Transportation Commission	2984	Peter Witt streetcar	Halton County Radial Railway	Milton, Ontario	operational
Ottawa Transportation Commission	696	streetcar	OC Transpo	Ottawa, Ontario	being preserved
Ottawa Transportation Commission	854	streetcar	Canada Science and Technology Museum	Ottawa, Ontario	restored for display
Ottawa Transportation Commission	859	streetcar	Canadian Railway Museum	Saint-Constant, Quebec	operational
Ottawa Transportation Commission	905	streetcar			to be restored
Edmonton Transit System	1	streetcar	Edmonton Radial Railway Society	Edmonton, Alberta	operational
Saskatoon Municipal Railway	200	snow sweeper	Edmonton Radial Railway Society	Edmonton, Alberta	being rebuilt
North Yonge Railways	416	radial car	Halton County Radial Railway	Milton, Ontario	operational

== See also ==
- List of tram builders
