= Thomas Ahearn =

Canadian inventor and businessman (1855–1938)

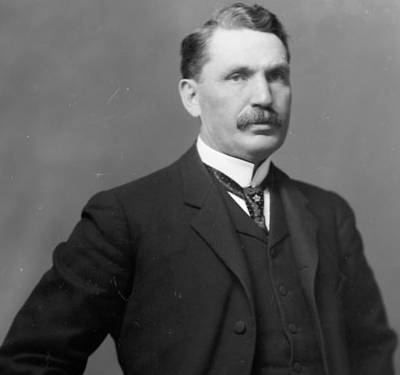
Thomas Ahearn in 1903

Thomas Ahearn, PC (June 24, 1855 – June 28, 1938) was a Canadian inventor and businessman. Ahearn, a native of Ottawa, Canada West, was instrumental in the success of a vast streetcar system that was once in Ottawa, the Ottawa Electric Railway, and was the first chairman of Canada's Federal District Commission in 1927. He held several patents related to electrical items and headed companies which competed for decades with Ottawa Hydro as providers for electricity in Ottawa. Ahearn co-founded the Ottawa Car Company, a manufacturer of streetcars for Canadian markets.

== Life and career ==
Thomas Ahearn was born in the Lebreton Flats area of Ottawa in 1855, he was the son of John Ahearn, an Irish blacksmith who served on the Rideau Canal maintenance crew, and Honorah Power. Both of his parents were Irish Catholic immigrants. He started as a messenger in the Chaudière office of the Montreal Telegraph Company (located in J. R. Booth's office). Within the year he was promoted to the company's Sparks Street office. At 19, he went to New York City and worked for two years at Western Union Telegraph Company. He returned to Ottawa and became chief operator for Montreal Telegraph Company. He became a manager of the Bell Telephone Company office in Ottawa in 1880.

In 1881, he founded the firm of Ahearn & Soper, electrical contractors, with Warren Y. Soper, former manager of Dominion Telegraph Company's local office. He formed Chaudière Electric Light and Power Company in 1887 and he later merged it with other companies which created the Ottawa Electric Company in 1894.

In 1892, he filed patents for both an "electric oven" and a "system of warming cars by means of electrically heated water". The use of this invention that year to prepare a meal which he delivered by streetcar to the Windsor Hotel caused the Ottawa Journal to say "...everything had been cooked by electricity, the first instance on record..." Thomas Ahearn filed eleven Canadian patents in all.

He was founder and president of the Ottawa Electric Railway Company, which provided electric streetcar service in the city and had the first streetcars with electric heaters (a device he patented). After running as a vast and very successful private operation for over half a century, it was later taken over by the Ottawa Transportation Commission. He, with Ahearn and William Wylie in September 1893, founded the Ottawa Car Manufacturing Company which manufactured streetcars.

In 1901, the Metropolitan Electric Co (Peoria Illinois) built a 2000-foot canal just north of the Britannia Boathouse Club to generate Hydroelectric power on the Deschênes Rapids. Although the hydroelectric project was abandoned as unfeasible, the unfinished canal was used in 1951 as the basis of the Britannia Yacht Club`s main and inner harbour, which provide 250 wet moorings, fuel and pumpout facilities, for both sail and power boats. In 1905-6, he built a new clubhouse, known as the Britannia Boating Club House. After the new clubhouse, which was designed by Charles Penruddocke William Kivas Band, was destroyed by fire on August 29, 1919, the Club returned to its present location, in a building designed by Edgar Lewis Horwood.

On June 23, 1906, he was appointed as director and elected president of Ottawa Gas Company.

In 1908, he formed a holding company called the Ottawa Light, Heat and Power Company, Limited, which wholly owned Ottawa Gas Company (which Ahearn & Soper bought) and Ottawa Electric Company. In this way, the private sector continued to compete with Ottawa Hydro for decades.

In 1927, he was appointed by Prime Minister MacKenzie King as the first chairman of the Federal District Commission, the predecessor to the National Capital Commission. There he had a five-year term ending in 1932. In this capacity, much of Ottawa's parkway network was developed, as well as the Champlain Bridge across the Ottawa River.

Thomas Ahearn was appointed to the Queen's Privy Council for Canada in 1928.

By 1933, Thomas Ahearn was listed as:

- The Broadcasting Committee of the Diamond Jubilee 1927, chairman
- The Federal District Commission, chairman
- Ottawa Electric Railway Company, president
- Ottawa Traction Company, president
- Ottawa Car Manufacturing Company, president
- Ottawa Electric Company, president
- Ottawa Gas Company, president
- Ottawa Light, Heat and Power Company, president
- Ottawa Investment Company, president
- Ottawa Land Association, president
- Ottawa Building Company, president
- Ahearn & Soper Limited, vice-president
- Wallace Realty Company, vice-president
- Bell Telephone Company of Canada, director and executive committee
- Canadian Westinghouse Company, director
- Northern Electric Company, director
- Bank of Montreal, director
- Royal Trust Company, director
- The Guarantee Company of North America, director
- American Institute of Electrical Engineers, member

Thomas Ahearn died June 28, 1938. He is interred in Beechwood Cemetery.

== Ahearn & Soper ==
Ahearn & Soper is an Ottawa company formed as an electrical engineering and contracting business in 1881 by Thomas Ahearn and Warren Young Soper, former manager of Dominion Telegraph Company's local office. Both men were working for Montreal Telegraph in Ottawa on March 13, 1873. The two founders were responsible for the creation of many companies in the fields of communications, heat, light and power, including the Ottawa Electric Railway Company and early electricity providers in Ottawa.

Their principal contracts have been with the Canadian Pacific Railway, Bell Telephone Company, Mackay-Bennett Cable Company of New York, and the North American Telegraph Company.

In the mid-1890s, they moved to 56 Sparks Street from 70 Sparks Street. In 1926, they built the Ottawa Electric Building (Albert Ewan, Architect) which still stands on 56 Sparks.

== Family ==
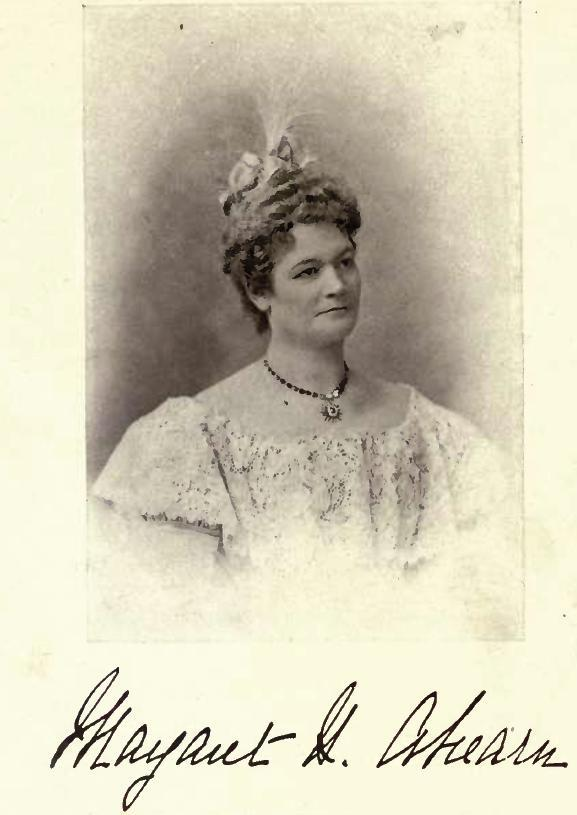
Mrs. Margaret Ahearn by William James Topley c. 1900

Thomas Ahearn's first marriage was to Lilias Mackay Fleck. In 1892, in his second marriage, he married Margaret Howitt (likely Margaret Howit Fleck). Margaret was the daughter of Alexander Fleck, President of the Vulcan Iron Works Co., Ottawa, and his wife, Lilias Walker. Margaret was born in Montreal, and was educated at the McGill Model School and at Bute House. The couple travelled in foreign countries with their family. She served as the President of the Victorian Order of Nurses. She was identified with the Local Council of Women, and the Woman's Canadian Historical Society. The couple lived at Buena Vista, 584 Maria Street, Ottawa.

Thomas Ahearn's son Frank would become the owner of the Ottawa Auditorium and the Ottawa Senators professional ice hockey team.

Ahearn's other child, Lilias Ahearn Southam(1888-1962) married Harry Southam in 1909. Harry Southam, publisher of the Ottawa Citizen, was part of the Southam newspaper empire.

== Legacy ==
Ahearn Avenue, a street in the Britannia Heights neighbourhood of Ottawa, is named for Ahearn.

In 1949, a monument to Ahearn was erected in Lansdowne Park, consisting of a square limestone pillar with two low walls of unequal length extending perpendicularly from the pillar, four drinking fountains attached to the shorter of the two walls, and a bench extending along the back side of the longer wall. A bronze plaque on the side of the pillar facing the fountains bears a relief of Ahearn, sculpted by Felix De Weldon, with his name and the years of his birth and death. The pillar was also inscribed on the two sides of the pillar adjoining the side with the plaque; one side reads "Hon. Thomas Ahearn, P.C./Of Ottawa/Pioneer in the field/Of electric lighting/And transportation./Presented with/Central Canada/Exhibition Association/Gold Medal, 1892"; the other side reads "This/Drinking fountain/Erected/In memory of/Hon. Thomas Ahearn/In the year 1949 by/Mr. & Mrs. T.F. Ahearn".

In 1967, the Ahearn Monument was moved from near the Bank St. entrance gate to Lansdowne Park to further into the park, at the rear of the Coliseum. During the redevelopment of Lansdowne Park in 2012, the monument was moved to a small plaza at the corner of Bank St. and Holmwood Ave., at the former site of Sylvia Holden Park. The monument was also altered at that time; the drinking fountains were removed, and the longer wall was lowered to the level of the bench.
