= OC Transpo =

Public transit service in Ottawa, Ontario, Canada

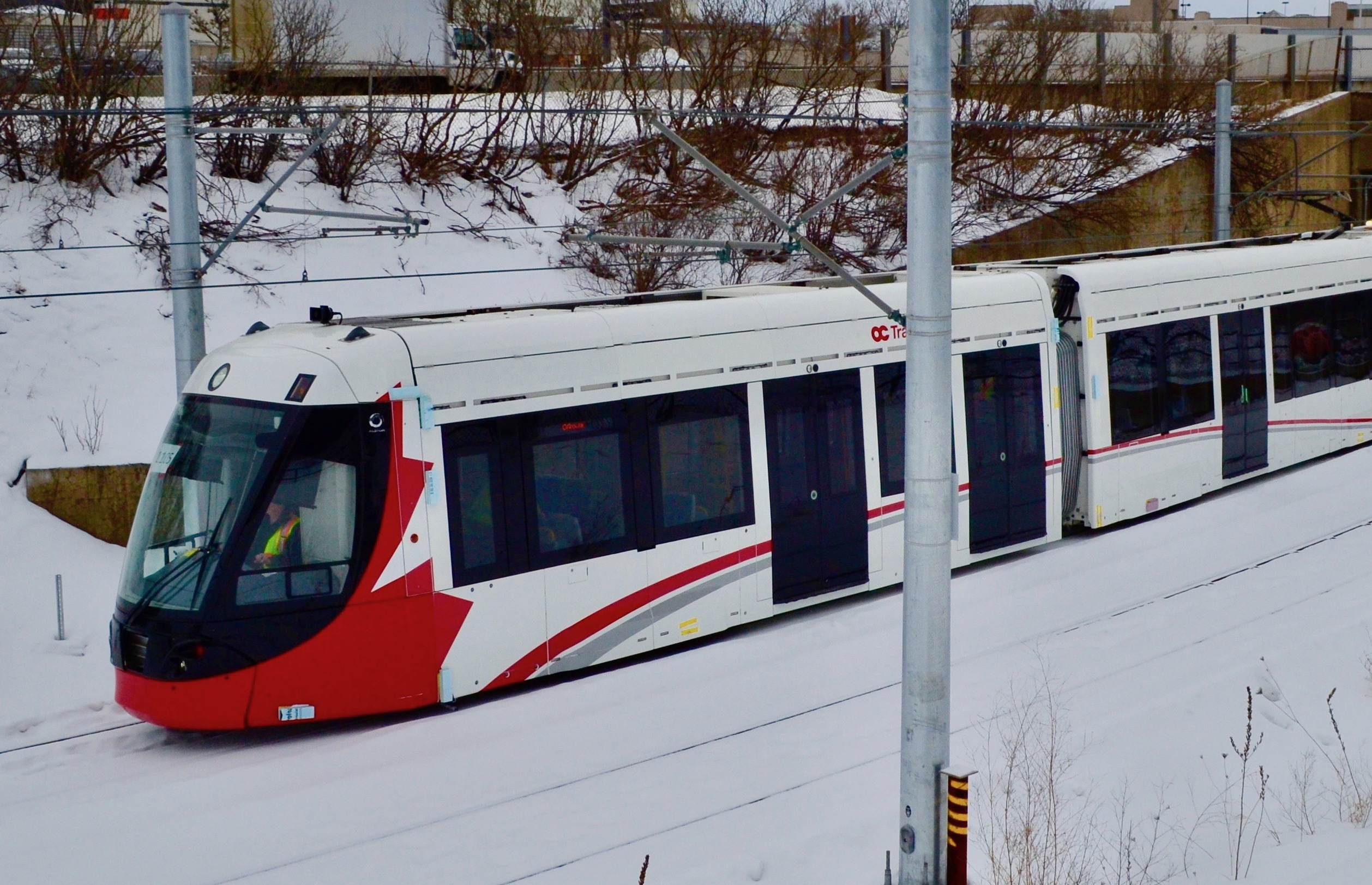
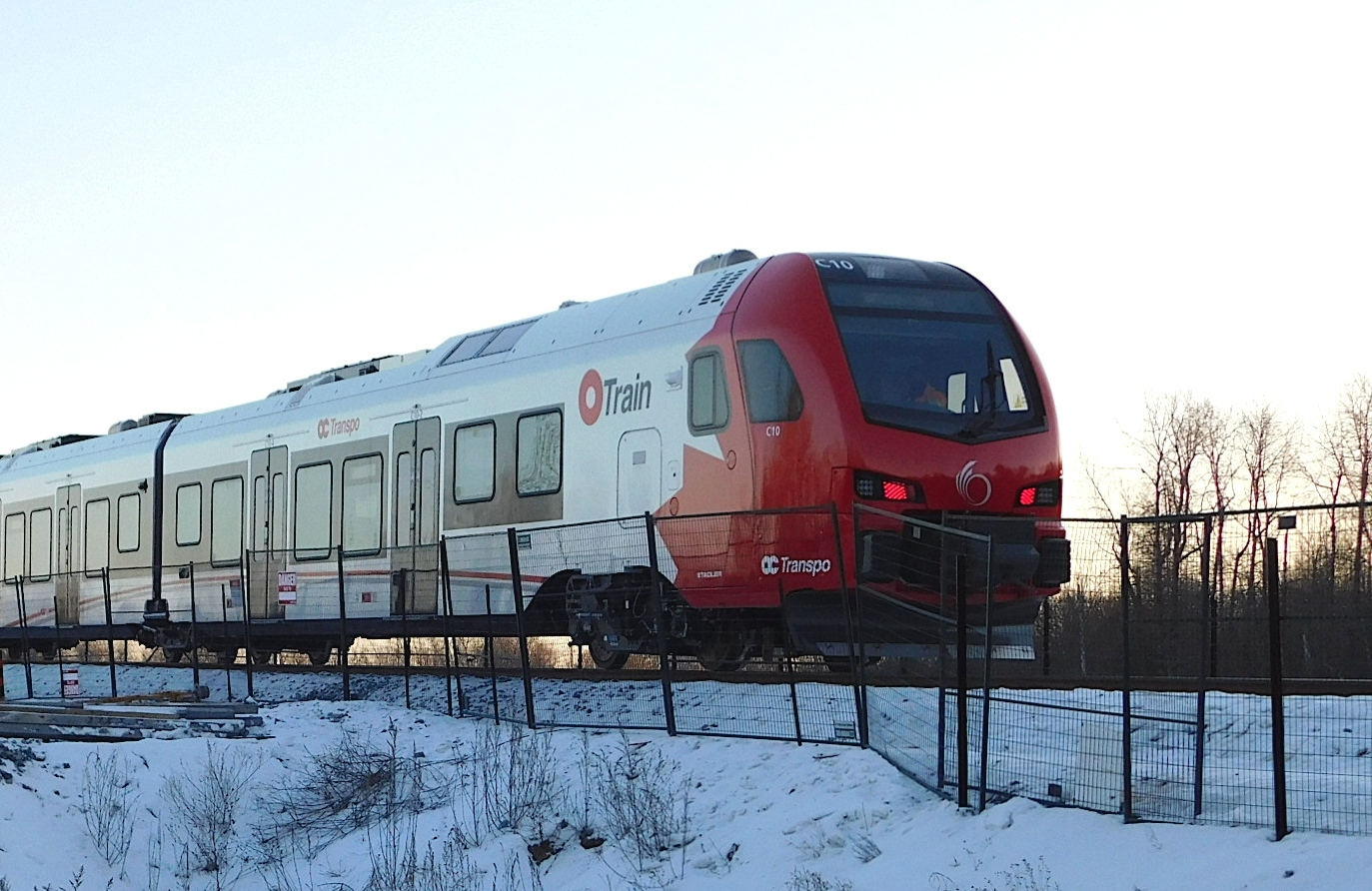
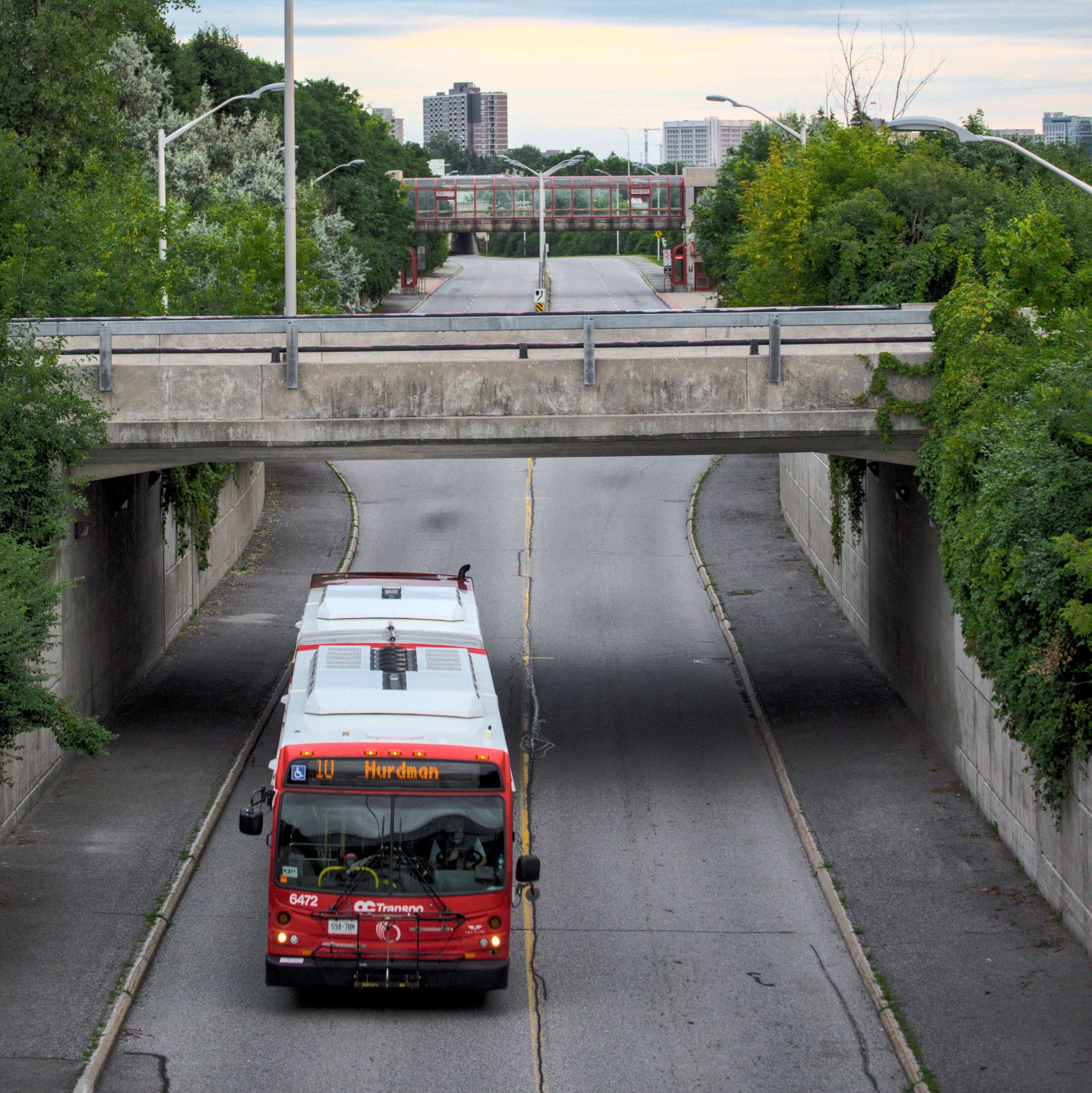
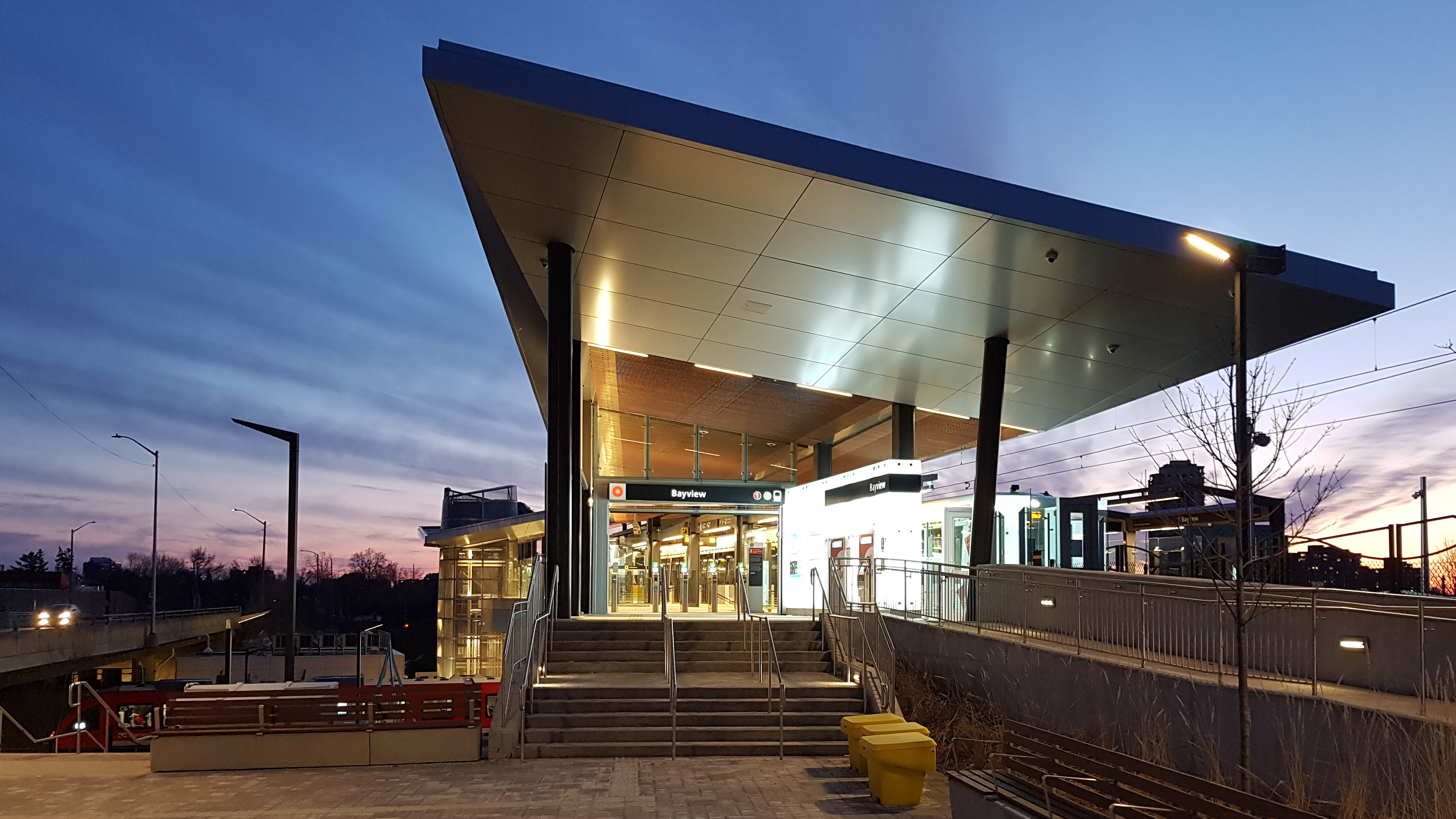
- From top left to bottom right: O-Train Line 1, O-Train Line 2, bus on the Transitway, and Bayview station

Overview
- Owner: City of Ottawa
- Area served: Ottawa, Ontario; Gatineau, Quebec
- Locale: Ottawa, Ontario
- Transit type: Bus service, light rail, bus rapid transit, paratransit
- Number of lines: 170 bus routes 3 light rail lines
- Number of stations: 25 rail stations 16 under construction
- Annual ridership: 70.7 Million (2025)
- Key people: Rick Leary, General Manager
- Headquarters: 1500 St. Laurent Boulevard; Ottawa, Ontario, Canada
- Website: octranspo.com

Operation
- Began operation: 1973; 53 years ago
- Number of vehicles: 800 buses, 13 diesel multiple units, 56 light rail vehicles

Technical
- Track gauge: 1,435 mm (4 ft 8 1/2 in) standard gauge

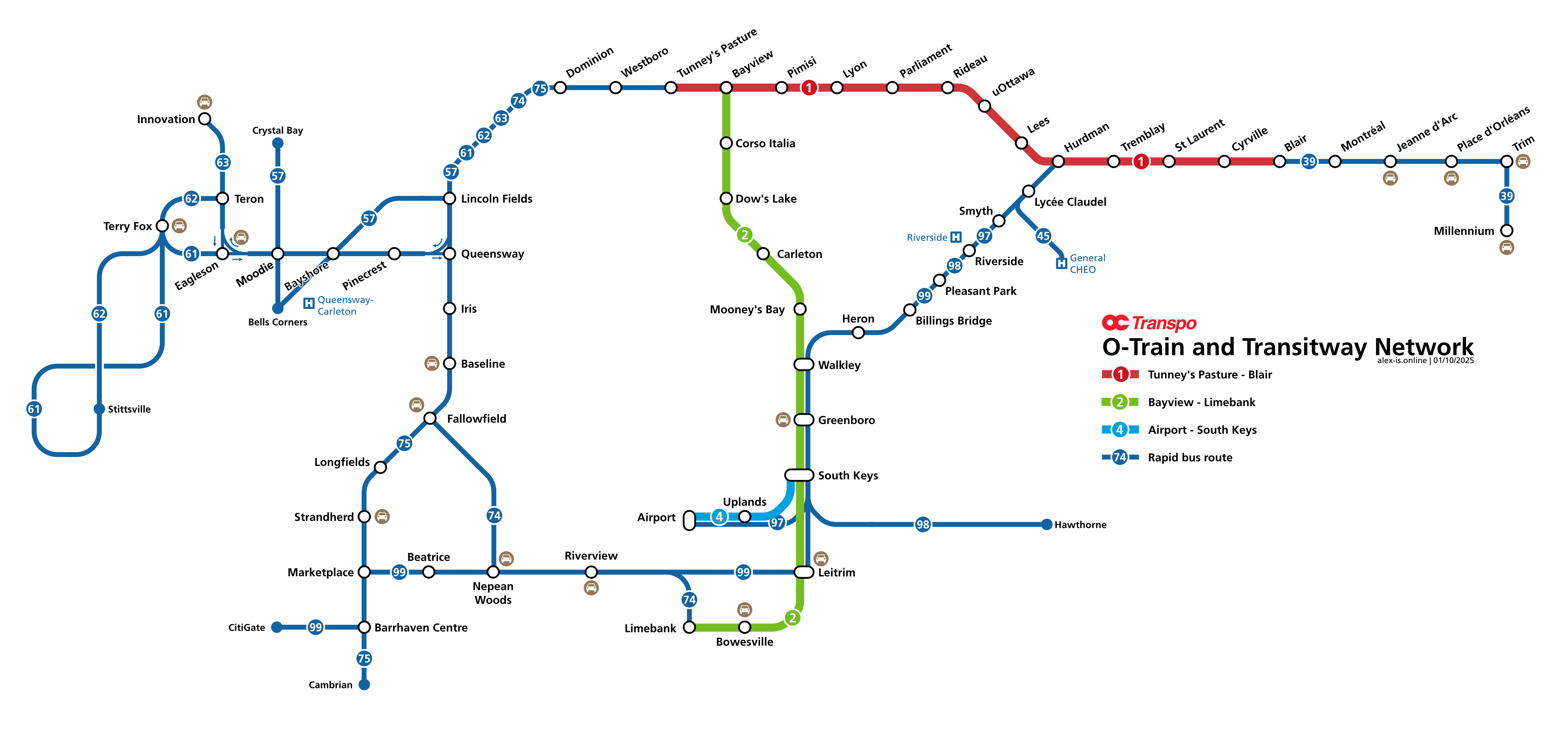
Rapid transit lines in Ottawa as of 2025. Only O-Train and Rapid service are shown.

OC Transpo, formerly the Ottawa-Carleton Regional Transit Commission, is the primary public transport agency for the city of Ottawa, Ontario, Canada, operating bus rapid transit, light rail, conventional bus routes, and door-to-door paratransit in the nation's capital region.

OC Transpo was established in 1948 as the Ottawa Transportation Commission, and currently operates three urban rail lines, 11 bus rapid transit (BRT) lines, and 170 regular bus routes. OC Transpo serves 25 light rail (O-Train) stations, and 43 BRT (Transitway) stations. OC Transpo achieved a total ridership of 68 million in 2024.

Ottawa was notable for its Transitway system, a network of grade separated busways linking outer suburbs to the downtown core which originally opened with five stations in 1983, and continued substantial expansion into the late 2000s. Much of the Transitway infrastructure has been, and is currently being, converted to light rail since the opening of the Confederation Line (Line 1) in 2019.

Some OC Transpo routes also serve Gatineau in Quebec during peak periods. In addition, many Société de transport de l'Outaouais routes serving Gatineau also operate into downtown Ottawa.

== System overview ==
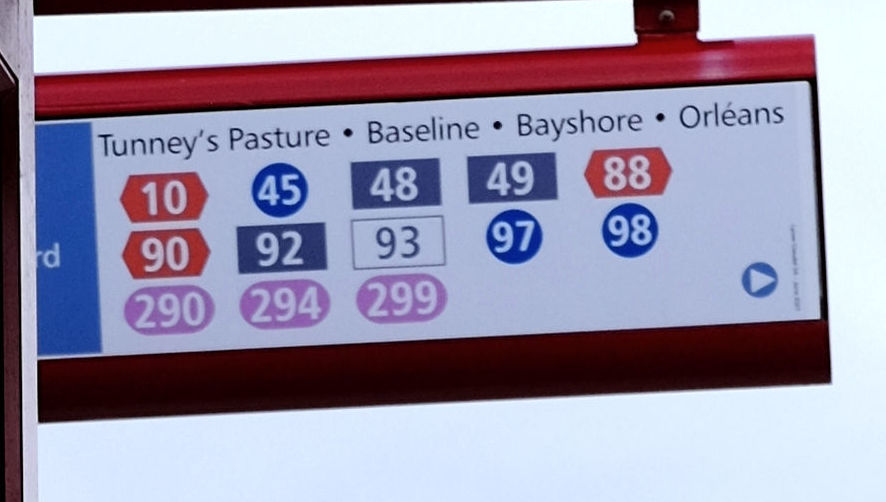
Route sign at Lycée Claudel station, featuring three rapid routes (blue circle), three frequent routes (orange hexagon), four local routes (grey rectangle), and three connexion routes (purple oval)

Ottawa's transportation system is built around the rapid transit spines of the O-Train and Transitway networks. This rapid transit system is fed, and augmented by, frequent, express, and local bus routes.

The rapid transit network is primarily oriented around downtown and the nearby government offices therein, whereas the non-rapid network of frequent routes provide orbital coverage in the suburbs. The majority of Ottawa's busiest routes are orbital routes, including frequent routes 88, 6, and 7, despite not being rapid transit. Express routes parallel rapid corridors with limited stops during peak periods, while local routes are comparatively infrequent with closely spaced stops. Six rapid bus routes (57, 61, 75, 39, 45, and 97) have 24 hour service.

O-Train Line 1 forms the core of the network, accounting for a quarter of all transit trips in the city in 2023. It has three major Transitway interchanges, one O-Train Line 2 interchange, and one intercity Via rail station across its length. It is a 100% low floor, electric light rail line, and it is notable for being fully grade separated its entire length, which is uncommon for light rail services. The ongoing Stage 2 O-Train expansion will replace portions of the existing Transitway bus rapid transit network with extensions of the Line 1 and a new Line 3, which will interline Line 1 and add additional service to the west end of Ottawa.

O-Train Line 2 is one of the three primary north–south rapid transit corridors in the city, and duplicates the southeastern Transitway for part of its length. The primary trip generator on the line is Carleton University, and the line interchanges with Line 1 at Bayview, O-Train Line 4 (the Airport Link) at South Keys, and the southwestern Transitway rapid route 74 at Limebank station. Line 2 was closed for Stage 2 expansion on 3 May 2020, re-opening alongside the Line 4 on 6 January 2025. It was originally constructed as a low cost ($21 million) rail pilot project, using a disused mainline freight line. It operates diesel trains on single and double track at a frequency of every 12 minutes.

The Transitway fans out from the city centre in four directions: east, southeast, southwest, and west, extending past the greenbelt and entering the outer ring suburbs of Kanata, Barrhaven, and Orléans. Many of the rapid bus routes that operate on the Transitway share the same route in the inner city, and then branch out in the suburbs to provide coverage. In addition to the BRT lines, the Transitway is also partly used by other, non-rapid transit routes, as well as emergency vehicles. The Transitway is mostly grade separated.

== History ==
=== Early history ===
Ottawa's first public transportation system began in 1886 with the operation of a horsecar system. The horse-drawn streetcars travelled back and forth from New Edinburgh to the Chaudière Bridge. The horsecar would remain a staple means of public transportation until 1891 after Thomas Ahearn founded the Ottawa Electric Railway Company. This private enterprise eventually provided heated streetcar service covering the downtown core. Electricity had been employed in a few places in Ottawa since the first demonstration of the incandescent bulb in 1883; the earliest were Parliament Hill and LeBreton Flats. In May 1885, electric lighting commenced in the city. In 1885 council contracted Ottawa Electric Light Company to install arc lamps on the city's streets.

=== 1970s: Formation, early Transitway and first strike ===
Transit in Ottawa was provided by the Ottawa Transportation Commission until 1973 when transit service in the city and its suburbs was transferred under the auspices of the Regional Municipality of Ottawa-Carleton. Its formal name was the Ottawa-Carleton Regional Transit Commission, but the service was promoted in both English and French under the OC Transpo name, whose OC initials are derived from Ottawa-Carleton. This renaming to OC Transpo was a break from the practice of simply retaining the central cities' (when they existed per se) transit system's name following regionalization as was the case for Toronto's Toronto Transit Commission and Hamilton's Hamilton Street Railway.

The 20-day 1979 strike was fought over a wage difference of a nickel and became known as "the five-cent bus strike". A pay increase of 16.5% was rejected by the union.

=== 1980s: Transitway ===
In the early 1980s, OC Transpo began planning for a bus rapid transit system, the Transitway. Construction of its various stations and segments followed over many years. The first segments were from Baseline to Lincoln Fields in the west end and from Lees to Hurdman (two immediate stations) in the east end.

=== 1990s: Second strike and shooting ===
The second strike for OC Transpo ran from 25 November to 16 December 1996. The strike ended under arbitration.

On Tuesday, 6 April 1999, former OC Transpo employee Pierre Lebrun, armed with a Remington Model 760 pump-action rifle, shot six people, killing four, in a shooting spree at OC Transpo's St. Laurent Boulevard garage, before killing himself. Lebrun was fired in August 1997 but later reinstated, and quit in 1998.

An inquest into the shooting revealed Lebrun was the subject of teasing for his speech impediment, and that his complaints to management were not investigated. The inquest revealed an "atmosphere of bullying", described as a "poisoned" environment by an employment equity manager. In response, OC Transpo instigated zero-tolerance policies regarding workplace harassment, a new employee-management communications program, and increased training on workplace respect. However, studies in 2003 and 2004 found there to be lingering elements of a negative work environment, and employee-management communication was reported to be strained following the 1996 strike.

=== 2000s: Trillium Line, expansions and third strike ===
OC Transpo launched the O-Train diesel light rail transit (DLRT) service on 15 October 2001, as a pilot project. The service consists of one north–south line, with major points of interest including Carleton University and the South Keys Shopping Centre. In late 2014, this line became known as the Trillium Line, or O-Train Line 2, to allow for expansion of the O-Train brand.

The province of Ontario ordered the amalgamation of the Regional Municipality of Ottawa-Carleton and its component municipalities into a single City of Ottawa municipality. When the new local governance took effect in 2001, OC Transpo became a department of the new city.

Following amalgamation, a bilingual replacement backronym for "OC" was sought, but no suitable candidates have been found. The anachronistic acronym has been kept, instead of the costly task of replacing the decals on all buses, bus stops, bus stations, and promotional material. Thus, "OC" is an orphan initialism.

A new section of the southwest Transitway opened on 12 December 2005, between the Nepean Sportsplex and Fallowfield Station. The new section runs parallel to Woodroffe Avenue and was built at a cost of $10 million. The new section has no stations and has replaced service along Woodroffe Avenue between the Nepean Sportsplex and Fallowfield. The Transitway was further expanded south into Barrhaven with Strandherd opened on 2 January 2007. There are also long range plans for other extensions in the Orleans and Kanata areas to keep up with more growing communities.

Following the 2006 municipal election campaign, Larry O'Brien was elected as mayor and cancelled the light rail expansion project, per a campaign promise. City Council decided to annul the project by a margin of 13–11 on 14 December 2006. The proposed northbound expansions from Bayview onward were later revived with the Confederation Line project, contracted in December 2012.

OC Transpo drivers, dispatchers, and maintenance workers under Amalgamated Transit Union local 279 went on strike 10 December 2008, at 12:01 am. The main causes of the strike were disagreements between the City of Ottawa and the union regarding scheduling, payroll and seniority. Rona Ambrose, the Federal Minister of Labour ordered a union membership vote on 8 January 2009, on the city's contract proposal in response to a request from mayor Larry O'Brien. Both the city and the union published their positions on respective websites. Vote results released on 9 January 2009, revealed that of those eligible to vote, 64% rejected the offer.

Meetings were held with a mediator throughout the month, but talks were repeatedly broken off. The ATU had requested to send all issues not related to scheduling to arbitration, which the city refused as it requested all issues to be sent to an arbitrator. As the strike entered the 50th day, Ambrose, who had initially refused to table back-to-work legislation, announced that such legislation would be introduced. However, on 29 January, the city and the ATU reached a deal that sent every issue to binding arbitration, thus ending the 51-day-long strike. On 2 February 2009, the O-Train Trillium Line started service after being out of service due to the strike. Buses followed the following Monday, 9 February 2009. Not all buses returned at once and OC Transpo said that all buses and routes were due to return by 6 April 2009. OC Transpo offered free transit for a week. December pass holders could either use their December passes until March or could get a refund. December pass holders were also subject to a 60% discount on March passes in order to win back transit users.

=== 2010s: Confederation Line and bus collisions ===
In December 2012, Ottawa City Council approved a major infrastructure project to build a 12.5 km east–west light metro line, the Confederation Line through the downtown. Construction of the line began in 2013.

On 18 September 2013, a double-decker OC Transpo bus, running on Route 76 from Barrhaven to downtown at 8:48 a.m., collided with a Toronto-bound Via Rail passenger train at a level crossing, equipped with active warning systems, near Fallowfield Station in Ottawa's southwest end. Six people on the bus (including the driver) were killed and at least 30 others were injured, of which at least eight were critically injured. There were no injuries or fatalities to passengers or crew of the train. The cause of the accident is unknown at this time. It was announced the following year that Route 76 would be retired and changed to route 72 in recognition of those who died in the accident. Incidentally, this route was spotted under a crossing gate at the Barrhaven Crossing Plaza on 6 November 2014; although no accident occurred, it sparked a lot of fear and questions in Barrhaven on whether these crossings are safe.

On 11 January 2019, another accident involving a double decker occurred, this time at Westboro station. The bus, operating Route 269, collided with the station's shelter shearing off part of the roof. Three people were killed (initially reported as two passengers, and one bystander from the platform. Later corrected to all three deaths were passengers) and 23 people were injured.

After several delays, the Confederation Line opened to the public on 14 September 2019. This line is also marketed as O-Train Line 1.

=== 2020s: O-Train maintenance and COVID-19 intervention ===
The Confederation Line continued to suffer from reliability issues throughout the first quarter of 2020. This is in contrast to the Trillium Line, which had a lower ridership and different technology, but generally better reliability. In response to this, and due to lower ridership in 2020, OC Transpo scheduled several temporary closures of Line 1, allowing Rideau Transit Maintenance to work on the line and improve its reliability. During maintenance, the R1 bus route replaced train service.

On 16 March 2020, as a preventative measure during the COVID-19 pandemic, OC Transpo began limiting front door boarding and seating to riders with accessibility needs. All other customers were required to board at the back of the bus. As a result, cash fares were neither accepted nor enforced on buses, but a valid fare was required to begin a trip at an O-Train station. Hand sanitizer was installed on all Line 1 stations, and later installed at most Transitway stations. From 15 June 2020, to 10 June 2022, the agency required employees and riders to wear face masks while riding busses and trains, and inside all stations.

On 3 May 2020, the Trillium Line was shut down for construction and expansion. Bus replacement service is provided by Route 2 from Bayview to South Keys.

On 8 August 2021, an empty train on the Confederation Line derailed while switching tracks after leaving Tunney's Pasture after one of the ten axles derailed. There were no injuries.

On 19 September 2021, a train with passengers on the Confederation Line derailed before entering Tremblay station after two axles became dislodged from the second car. After leaving Tremblay station in a derailed state, the train increased speed to about 35 km/h, crossed a bridge over Riverside Drive, struck a signal mast and switch heater and finally came to a stop between Tremblay and Hurdman station using train-initiated emergency braking. There were no injuries.

The city of Ottawa's public transport system has historically catered to exclusively 9 to 5 public employees, a population that largely switched to remote work during COVID-19. This, combined with decades of underinvestment and thinned resources, has led to OC Transpo having a poor ridership recovery rate from before COVID; sitting at only 70% as of 2023. Council estimates that ridership will return to pre pandemic levels by 2030.

The low ridership recovery rate put OC Transpo into a difficult financial position. Despite this, city staff remain hopeful for the future of the project, with current mayor, Mark Sutcliffe, pointing out that the project would have always require funding from the federal or provincial governments anyway, and so OC Transpo budget shortfalls shouldn't affect it. City staff have proposed further funding through raising taxes, increasing fares, or lobbying higher levels of government. On 13 November 2024, OC Transpo announced an increase in fares for all passengers, with a larger increase for seniors and youth riders.

On 6 December 2024, OC Transpo announced a phased re-opening of lines 2 and 4, beginning with 5-day service that expands to 6- and then 7-day service over the following weeks. The expanded line includes six new stations along Line 2, with two additional stations connecting to Ottawa Macdonald–Cartier International Airport. Lines 2 and 4 opened as scheduled on 6 January 2025.

== Features ==
OC Transpo has a fleet of 800 buses that run on regular streets, all of which are fully accessible Low floor buses. OC Transpo uses many articulated buses to provide service. Some of the routes that run on the Transitway, including the city's most-used bus routes, are served almost exclusively by articulated buses (e.g., routes 57, 61, 62, and 75). Peak hour connexion routes are served primarily by Double Decker buses.

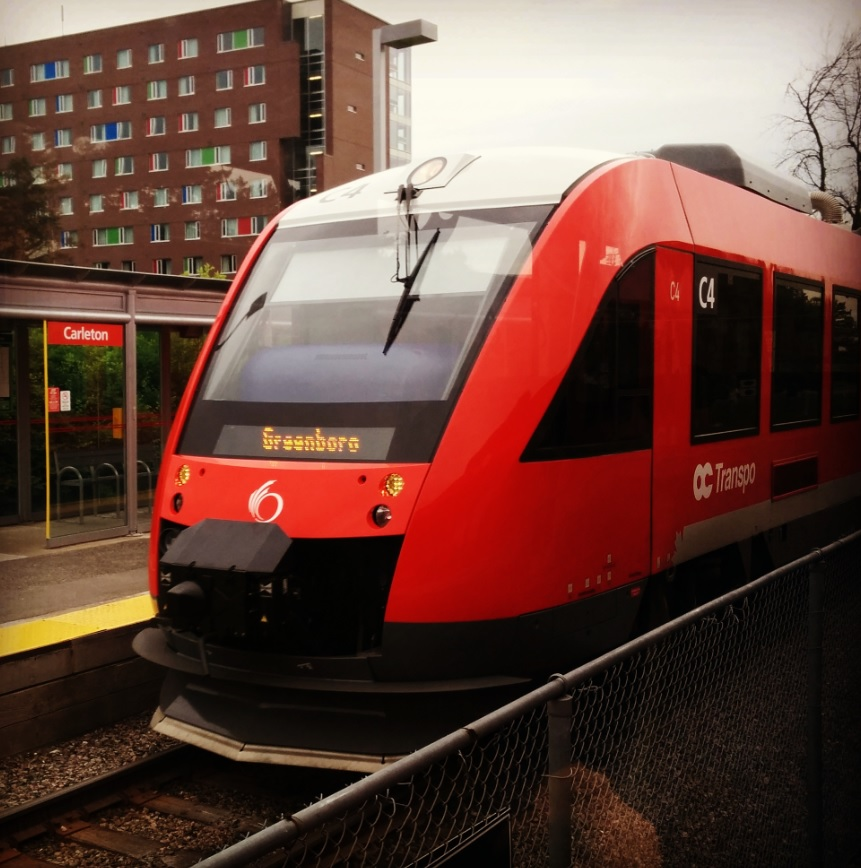
The O-Train (Line 2) at Carleton University

In 2001, a pilot diesel-powered light rail service project, the original O-Train known today as Line 2, was introduced. The local government announced expansion plans for the light rail to other parts of Ottawa, including a possible link to the Ottawa International Airport. Service to Gatineau would have also been possible, over the nearby Prince of Wales railway bridge over the Ottawa River. However, on 14 December 2006, City Council led by Mayor Larry O'Brien cancelled the north-south light rail expansion project. A new model of the project, to have a citywide integrated light rail system, was made, with work beginning in 2013 and will be completed in 2023. This new project envisions fully grade separated rapid transit service on the original Transitways from Baseline station or Moodie dr. in the west to Trim Park and Ride in the east. The gap between the east end west branches of Transitway will be replaced by a new downtown Subway tunnel under Queen and Rideau streets with three underground stations. O-Train Line 2 will be extended to Riverside South and will include a spur to the Ottawa Macdonald–Cartier International Airport, thus creating direct airport to downtown service. As for the suburbs, they will be served by 65 km of new Transitways. The first phase of the project, called the Confederation Line includes 12.5 km of rail between Tunney's Pasture and Blair, including the downtown subway.

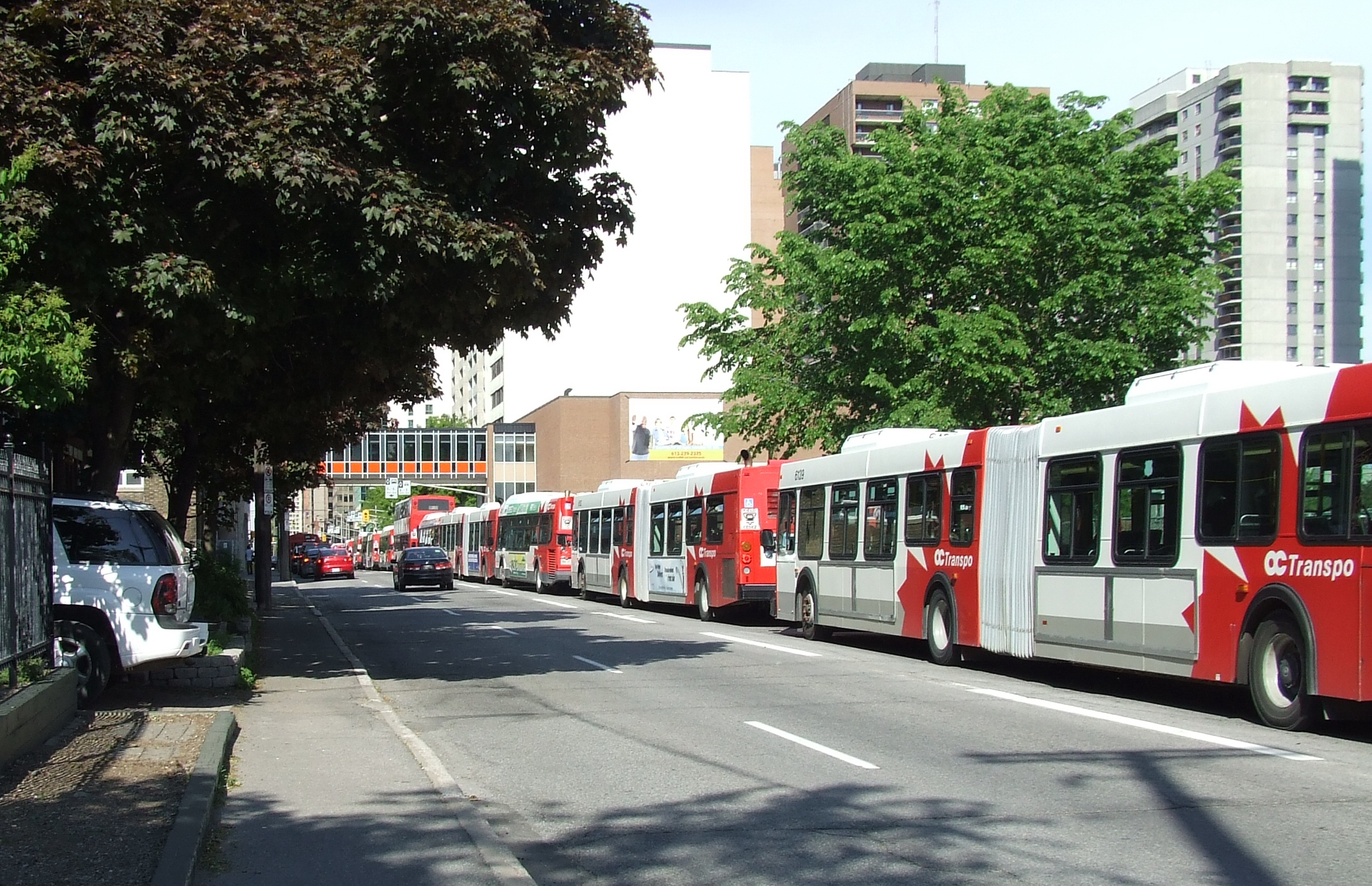
Bus bunching on Slater Street

Ottawa has a relatively extensive rapid transport network compared to other North American cities of its size, and relatively high ridership. This was initially seen on the Transitway, a bus rapid transit system where buses travel on dedicated roadways and lanes. The Transitway lines that converged onto the city centre created a transportation bottleneck, with buses bunching heavily on city streets, with this in turn constricting the effective capacity and frequency of the entire Transitway network. From 2014 until the opening of the Confederation Line in 2019, the core of the central Transitway was decommissioned and converted to light rail, including a downtown rail tunnel to increase the system's capacity, also allowing OC Transpo to reallocate its limited bus fleet to provide service elsewhere. The decision to convert the BRT network to rail was chosen due to trains being significantly more cost effective for the capacity needed, and an underground bus tunnel being completely impractical for the scale of service required.

For a number of years, OC Transpo has carried bicycle racks on some routes as a part of the "Rack & Roll" campaign. These racks carry up to two bicycles at the front of the bus and fold up against the bus when not in use. As of 2021, all buses in the fleet are equipped with bike racks. Cyclists may use the racks at any time of day, provided there is room for the cyclist on board the bus. Traditionally, the racks have been available only between April and October, and there has been much debate over continuing the program throughout the year. Bicycles can be brought on board O-Train at all times of the year. As of 2023, though, a permanent winter pilot has been introduced.

There are four bus depots located throughout the city. The largest and headquarters is located at 1500 St. Laurent Boulevard, with two other smaller but frequently used depots being located at 168 Colonnade Road (Merivale Garage) and the other on Queensview Drive (Pinecrest Garage). A major new maintenance depot which opened its doors in 2010 is located on Industrial Avenue.

Advertising on OC Transpo buses is contracted to Pattison Outdoor Advertising. Advertising on bus shelters is contracted to Branded Cities.

== Routes ==
OC Transpo has over 200 bus routes (as of 16 January 2026) that are grouped both by their number and the colour with which they are represented on system maps and on bus stop flags.

A major route overhaul and changes to the network occurred in the April 2025, following opening of lines 2 and 4. Most existing routes saw changes, with some routes being taken out completely while others where renumbered. Many new routes were also added.

== Fleet ==
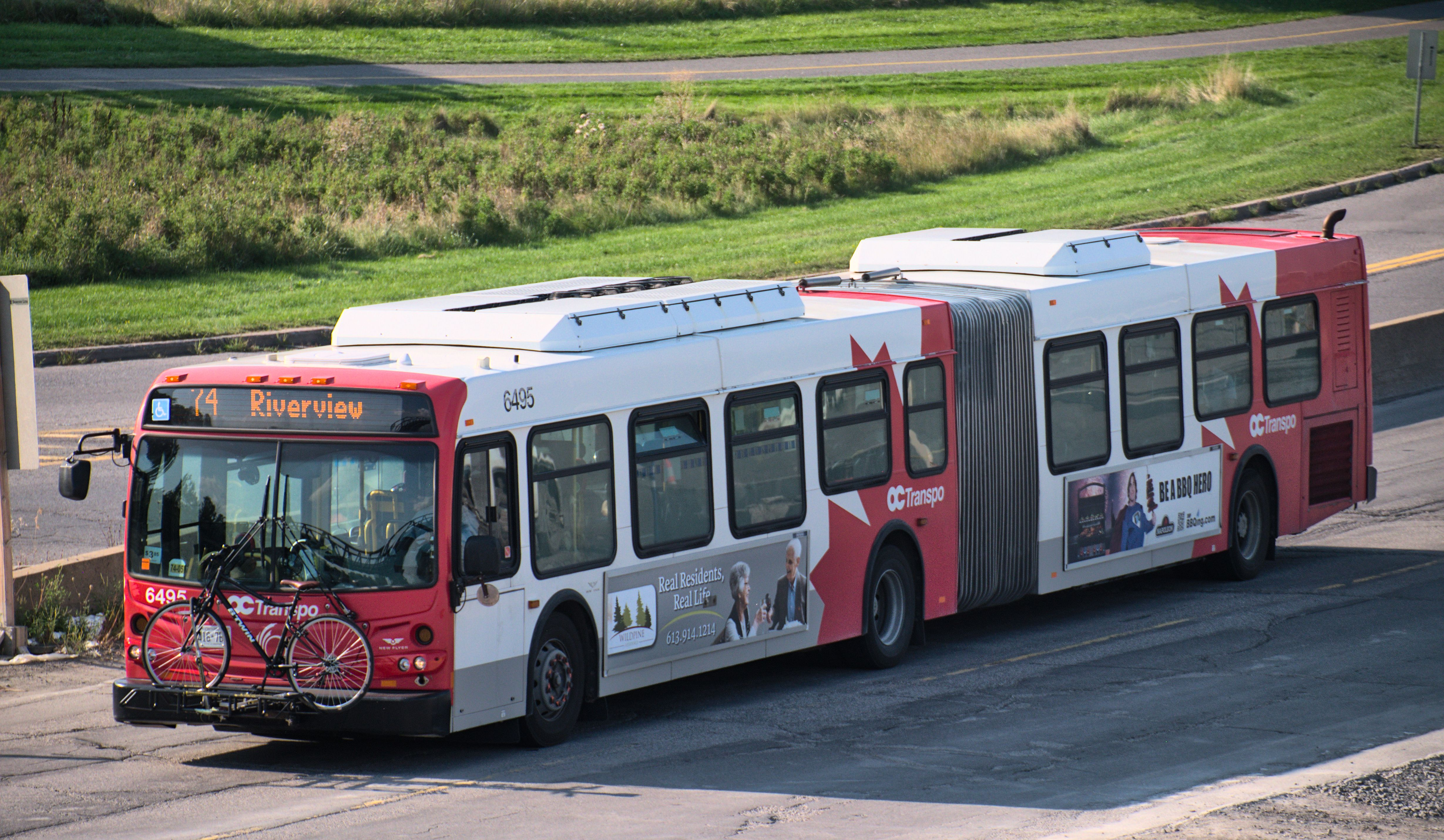
Articulated OC Transpo D60LFR on the Transitway

Ottawa's public transport network primarily relies on 18.5m (60ft) long articulated buses. They are considered the workhorses of the system, and can carry up to 110 people. The city also uses double decker Alexander Dennis Enviro500 MMC buses, which have similar overall capacity to the articulated buses, but with much more seating. The city also has a fleet of lower capacity regular buses, which are 12.5m (40ft) long. All buses have two or three sets of doors.

=== Issues ===
Ottawa's articulated buses are rear wheel drive, meaning the back portion of the bus "pushes" the rest of the bus forward. This in contrast to articulated buses where the middle axle is power, which "pull" the bendy section along.

Pusher style articulated buses have the ability to kink themselves when there is poor traction, and this can be seen in Ottawa in the winter, where a large part of the articulated fleet traps themselves on the road, unable to move. In 2022, OC Transpo began a pilot project where it would pre-emptively pull articulated buses out of service, if 30 cm of snow or another severe weather event was predicted.

Line 1's Citadis Spirit trains, custom built by the French rolling stock manufacturer Alstom, have been riddled with issues, and have garnered a bad reputation by both media and the public. In the first two years of service, they suffered repeated faults, including, derailments, computer failures, and cracked wheels, among other things.

The Ottawa Light Rail Transit Public Inquiry report found that there were several causes for the vehicles' poor reliability. The vehicles push what an LRT can do, and are treated more like heavy rail subway vehicles on line 1, rather than like the light rail vehicles they are in reality. In addition to this, the OC Transpo workforce was inexperienced operating the vehicles, and the construction and testing of line 1, as well as the trains that run on it, was heavily rushed. This, together with human error, and an unrealistically low budget for the project, all contributed to the vehicles' faults.

=== Bus fleet ===
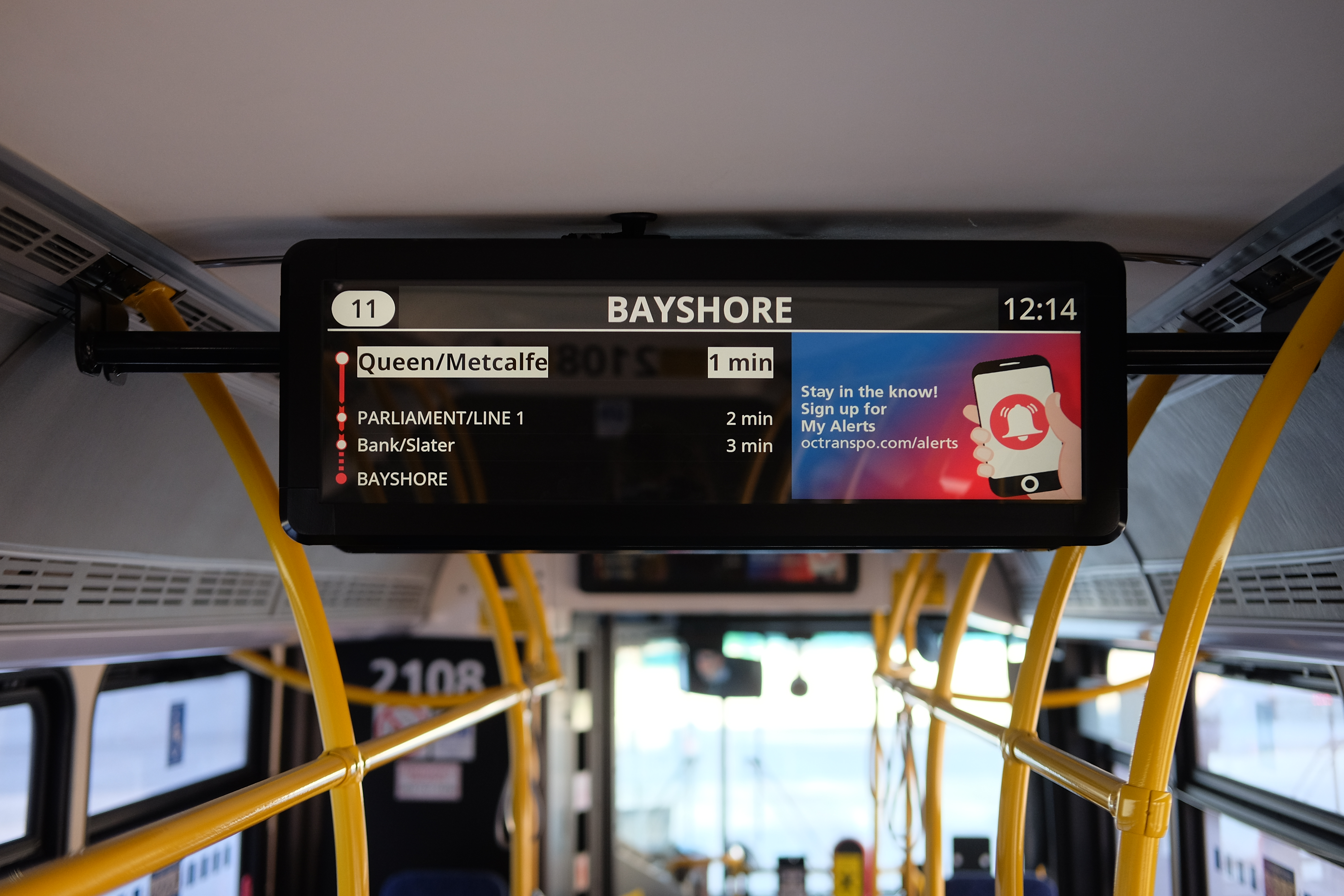
Interior screen on an OC Transpo bus

The New Flyer D60LFR was chosen for the bus network because of a deal New Flyer made to the city in August 2010, replacing 226 of its older underpowered 60-foot D60LF articulated buses (purchased between 2001 and 2004) with brand new D60LFR models. The bus exchange was completed in March 2011. OC Transpo was given incentives as part of the deal, including rebates on the trading-in of the old buses and a credit on new parts. Eighty new D60LFR articulated buses were also purchased from New Flyer, bringing the combined total to 306 buses. All of the 2001–2004 D60LFs are now retired. Some of the older New Flyer D60LF sixty-foot articulated buses have caught on fire during the summer of 2006 and the Summer/Fall of 2010, due to overheating engines, effectively putting them out of service.

On 12 July 2011, OC Transpo announced that all remaining high floor buses were retired and the fleet is air-conditioned for Ottawa's short hot and humid summers.

Ottawa announced that it would be adding 75 double-decker buses to its fleet on 24 August 2012, and were put in service in October. They were previously trialed in 2006 and 2007. They were added to the fleet primarily for their higher seated capacity compared to the articulated buses in use (86 versus 55), and are employed mainly on commuter oriented "Connection" routes. Part of their introduction was also due to them being seen as spectacle that could increase system ridership, and in practice, 41 percent of riders and drivers say they prefer the bilevels, while 30 percent prefer single deck buses. The decision to purchase double decker buses was also supported by them being less expensive to run than articulated buses, and taking up less road space.

The maintenance of the fleet was complicated by adding buses from another manufacturer (OC Transpo already had buses from New Flyer, Orion, MCI and Nova bus before purchasing the double-deckers from Alexander Dennis). In cold and wet weather, condensation is prone to collecting on the roof of the upper deck, dripping on passengers below.

As of 6 September 2026, OC Transpo has a fleet consisting of 800 buses, made up of 8 bus models:

Make	Model	Number in fleet	Capacity	Notes
Nova Bus	LFS (4th generation)	249	68 - 36 Seated	
Nova Bus	LFS (3rd generation)	11	68 - 37 Seated	Ex Grand River Transit
New Flyer	D60LF	21	110 - 55 Seated	Articulated buses, Currently in the process of retirement
New Flyer	D60LFR	229	110 - 55 Seated	Articulated buses
New Flyer	XD60	1	120 - 53 Seated	Articulated buses
Alexander Dennis	Alexander Dennis Enviro500 MMC	10	96 - 86 Seated	Double-decker buses, Currently in the process of retirement
GMC (marque)	Glaval Titan	31	14 Seated	Para-Transpo minibuses
Dodge (Ram)	6 meter long (ProMaster)	6	7 Seated	Para-Transpo minibuses
Dodge (Ram)	7 meter long (ProMaster)	55	10 Seated	Para-Transpo minibuses

==== Electric buses ====
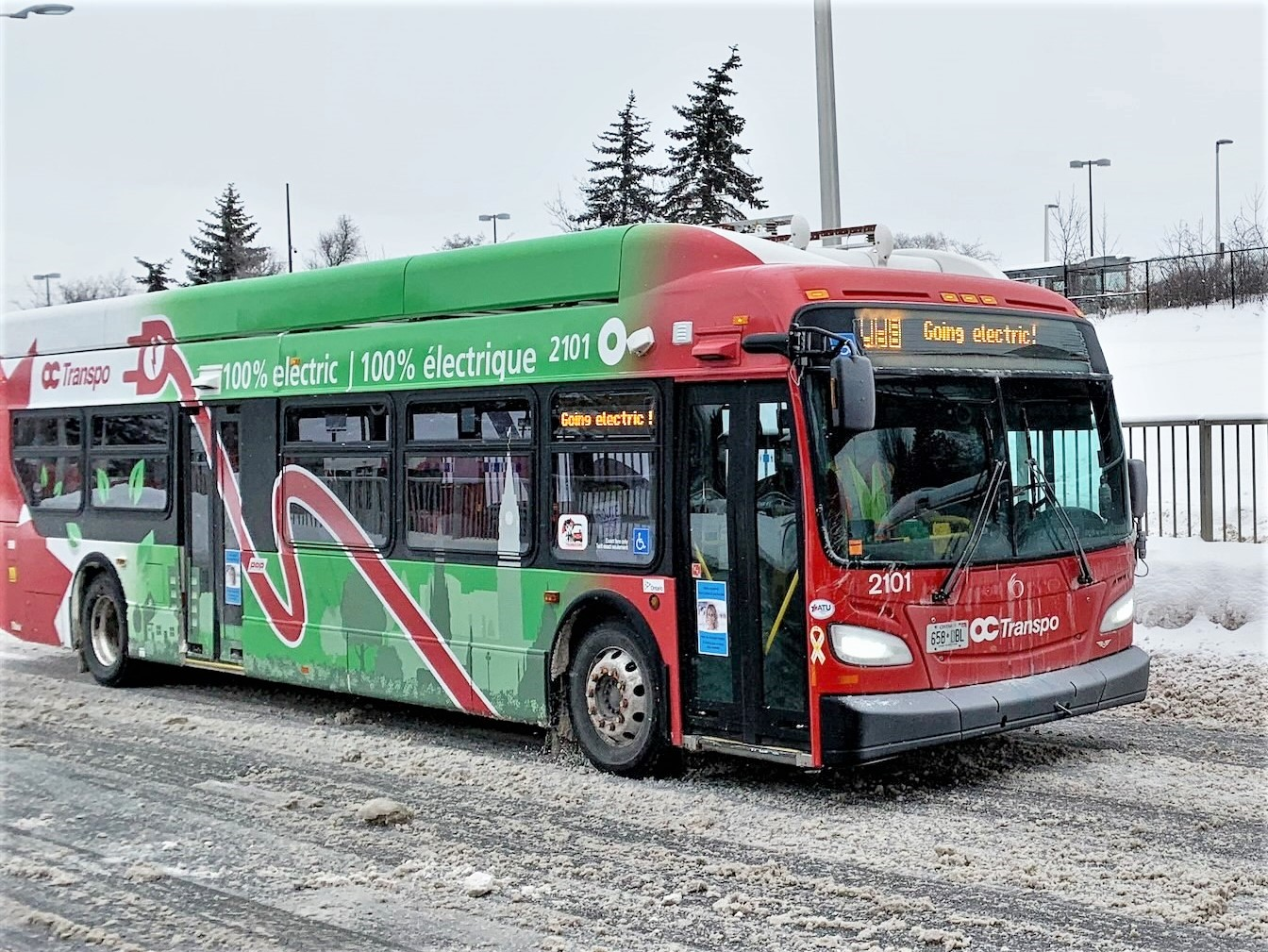
Electric bus on a route test prior to officially beginning service, pictured in January 2022

OC Transpo purchased four electric New Flyer XE40 buses, which were delivered in November 2021, and entered service in early 2022. 21 more XE40's went into service in early 2025 along with 4 brand new LFSe+'s around the same time. On 7 June 2021, a plan was announced that, if approved, would see 450 electric buses purchased by 2027, and full fleet electrification by 2036.

Make	Model	Number in fleet	Notes
Nova Bus	LFSe+	55	More to be delivered later in 2026
New Flyer	XE40 'Xcelsior'	132	More to be delivered Later in 2026

=== Rail fleet ===
The O-Train has three kinds of rolling stock. Ottawa uses custom Alstom Citadis Spirit electric light rail vehicles on Line 1. On Line 2, stock European train models are used, with the Alstom Coradia LINT and Stadler FLIRT. Despite being referred to locally as light rail, the Line 2 trains are actually heavy rail vehicles. The O-Train vehicles have significantly higher capacity than the bus fleet, with the line 1 trains having a capacity for 600 passengers.

Make	Model	Number in fleet	Notes
Alstom	Coradia LINT	6 trains (12 Cars)	Used on Line 2 (Trillium Line) from 2015 to 2020. Currently used on Line 4, while one coupled pair is used on Line 2.
Alstom	Citadis Spirit	56 LRVs	Used on Line 1 (Confederation line). During weekday service, LRVs are coupled together to form two car 80m trains. Single car trains operate on weekends.
Stadler Rail	Stadler FLIRT	7 trains (28 Cars)	Used on Line 2

=== Historical Fleet ===
OC Transpo holds a small fleet of retired buses that they occasionally use for events, rented out party busses and for preservation reasons. All Busses are currently being held at the Pinecrest garage.

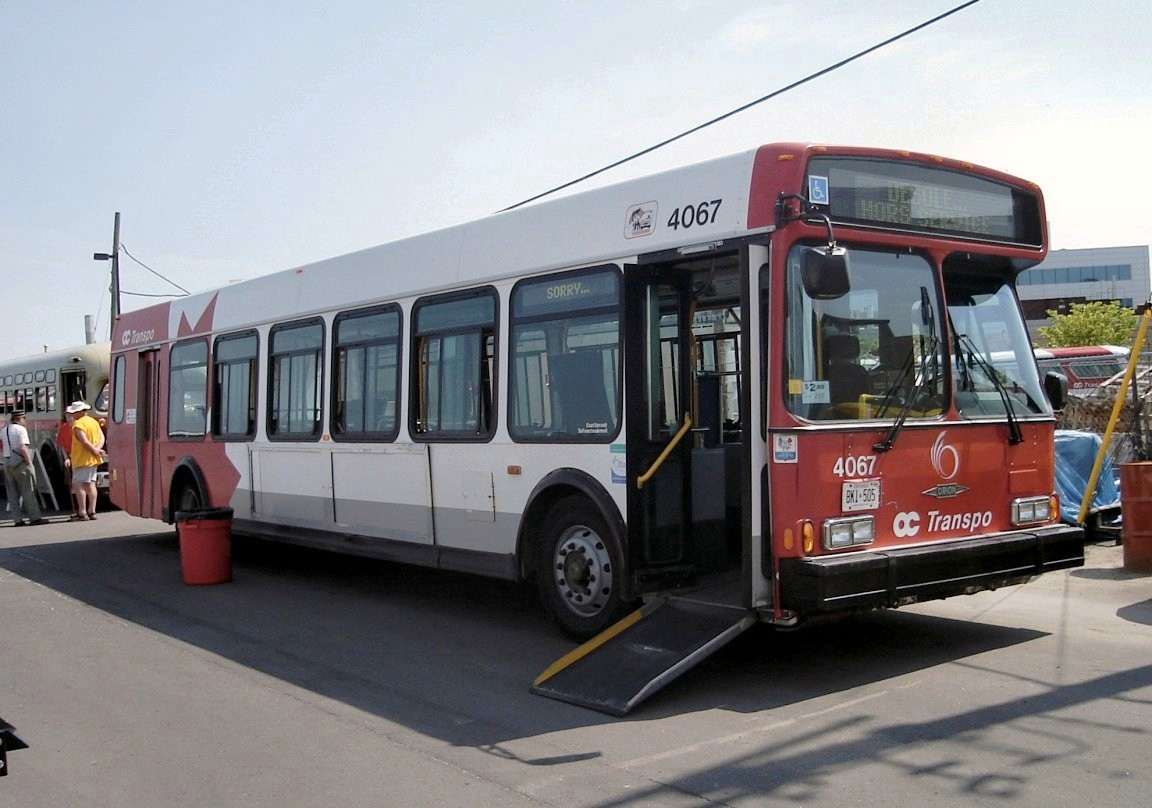
Orion VI 4067 which was in the same batch order as 4024

Make	Model	Year	Notes
Orion	Orion VI (4024)	1999	Being held outside and planned to be scrapped
GMDD	TA60-102N	1982	Ex- HSR 8202
GMDD	TDH-5301	1961	Former Ottawa Transit Commission
GMC	TDH-5105	1959	Former Ottawa Transit Commission
GMC	TDH-5105	1959	Former Ottawa Transit Commission, Restored as open air, single door sightseeing bus
CC&F	CD-36ATC	1950	Former Ottawa Transit Commission, Former London Transit
Twin Coach	38-S	1950	Former Ottawa Transit Commission, Former Transit Windsor

=== Garages ===
OC Transpo currently has 5 bus garages and two rail yards that house the fleet, and are also where vehicle maintenance is carried out. The garages are as follows:

- St. Laurent Garage. Opened in 1959, capacity of 275 buses. OC Transpo headquarters are also located on property.
- St. Laurent North Garage. Opened in 1987 and has a capacity of 207 buses. Located adjacent to St. Laurent Garage.
- Industrial Garage. Opened in 2010 as a purpose-built garage for 167 double-decker and articulated buses.
- Pinecrest Garage. Opened 1976 and has a capacity of 193 buses. Located near Pinecrest Rd. and Highway 417.
- Merivale (Colonnade) Garage. Opened in 1978 and has a capacity of 215 buses. Located in Nepean between Merivale Rd. and Prince of Wales Dr. Formerly known as the Colonnade Garage, as it is located on Colonnade Rd. South.
- Walkley Yard. Houses the Trillium Line DMU fleet. Located in the CNR Walkley Yard, off of Albion Rd. North. Opened 2001.
- Belfast Yard. Constructed to house the Confederation Line LRV fleet. Complete in 2018. Located on Belfast Road, with the rail access in between Tremblay and St Laurent Stations.

Soon To Enter Service

- Corkstown Yard. Soon to be opened with the O-train line 3 west extension, Located on Corkstown Rd, with rail access to Future Moodie station at the end of the track.

== Fares ==
OC Transpo fare history (1996–2018)

OC Transpo fares can be paid with cash, a Presto card, Debit card, Credit card, or mobile wallet, since the introduction of O-Payment. Reduced fares and pass subscriptions can only be loaded onto a Presto card, whereas on bank cards and phone wallets, fare charges are automatically capped when reaching the daily and monthly pass rates. Transfers are free, and last between 90 and 105 minutes from tapping on.

The STO Multi-Card is also accepted only if it has one of the following loaded onto it:

- A transfer issued from a STO bus, valid for two hours
- A monthly pass (may be regular, student, senior, or ECO)
- The Fidélité Annual Pass
- The Cam-Puce university pass
- One-day, three-day, or seven-day pass

Transfers are printed for passengers upon boarding by the driver (cash only). Transfers are integrated in the Presto cards when using the e-wallet. As of 24 January 2025, such transfers are valid for:

- On a weekday:
  - 105 minutes when issued from 2:45 am to 6:30 am
  - 90 minutes when issued from 6:30 am to 6:00 pm
  - 105 minutes when issued from 6:00 pm to 10:30 pm
  - until 4:30 am when issued from 10:30 pm to 2:45 am
- On a Saturday:
  - 105 minutes when issued from 2:45 am to 10:00 am
  - 90 minutes when issued from 10:00 am to 6:00 pm
  - 105 minutes when issued from 6:00 pm to 10:30 pm
  - until 4:30 am when issued from 10:30 pm to 2:45 am
- On a Sunday:
  - 105 minutes when issued from 2:45 am to 10:30 pm
  - until 4:30 am when issued from 10:30 pm to 2:45 am

In 1951, OC Transpo had a fare of 10 cents, equivalent to $1.22 in 2024 dollars. The fares have since increased on a regular basis, although discounted fares were previously available with tickets. In 2012, a senior fare of $2.00 was introduced, although it was increased in subsequent years.

Current fares as of 22 October 2026 are:

- $4.15 (Cash) for adults 18+ ($4.10 for O-Payment and Presto)
- $4.10 (With Presto Card) for youth 13–17. Youth are free after 17:00 on weekdays, on weekends, and holidays.
- $3.28 (with Presto Card) for seniors (ages 65 and up)
- $2.05 (With Presto Card) for pre-teen (ages 11–12). Pre-teens are free after 17:00 on weekdays, on weekends, and on holidays.
- $1.75 for EquiPass and Community
- Free for children 10 and under

The fares listed above only apply if the rider is using their Presto card to pay. All riders who pay cash, regardless of their age or condition, will pay a fare of $4.15. To benefit from a discount, a Presto card with the discount loaded must be used.

Seniors ride free Wednesdays and Sundays. Proof of age may be required. Seniors alo receive four free Para Transpo rides per month.

=== DayPass and multi-day passes ===
OC Transpo long-term and day passes as of 22 October 2026
Duration	Price per pass	Price per day	Category
1 Day	$12.25		Individual/Family
2-for-1 DayPass	$12.25		Family
3 Days	$30.75	$10.25	Individual
5 Days	$49.00	$9.80	Individual
7 Days	$58.00	$8.29	Individual
1 Month	$43.25	≈$1.42	Access/Community
1 Month	$59.75	≈$1.95	Senior (65+)
1 Month	$58.25	≈$1.90	EquiPass
1 Month	$138.50	≈$4.50	Adult

The monthly pass, introduced in 1976, offers the lowest price per day for unlimited rides on OC Transpo. Paper passes were discontinued by 2017, with Presto monthly passes being the sole option.

OC Transpo introduced the DayPass at $5 ($7.16 in 2017 dollars) per voucher or $6 ($8.60 in 2017 dollars) cash on 1 July 1998. By 2000, the cash price matched the $5 voucher price. The price for both increased to $6 ($7.64 in 2017 dollars) in 2003, and since then, DayPass fares were gradually increased to reach $10.25 in 2017. DayPass vouchers were no longer sold since 1 July 2009, leaving only cash and tickets on the bus as a method of payment.

The Family DayPass was launched concurrently with the DayPass. At launch, it was available on Sundays and statutory holidays, allowing up to two adults and youth (age 12 or older) to ride the bus with up to four children (age 11 or younger) at the same price of a DayPass. With the discontinuation of DayPass vouchers on 1 July 2009, the Family DayPass was also made available on Saturdays.

On 1 January 2018, OC Transpo launched multi-day passes (3, 5, or 7 days). This allows multiple days of DayPass service, up to a week, to be purchased in advanced at a lower cost. Multi-day passes cannot be used as a Family DayPass, cannot be loaded on a Presto card and are emitted as a paper transfer. Passes are activated immediately upon purchase.

=== Discontinued fares ===
Express fares were premium peak period bus routes, treated as a second fare zone by OC Transpo. Express bus passes for adults and students, and regular senior bus passes, were also accepted. On 1 January 2017, the Express fare was discontinued, and Express routes were rebranded as Connexion routes. Since this change, the entire OC Transpo network is treated as a single fare zone. The agency also cited the Confederation Line (Line 1), which opened in September 2019, as a reason for discontinuing the Express fare.

Rural Express fares were introduced on six routes on 2 July 2002, as a third fare zone. The cash fare was $4.75 (equivalent to $6.48 in 2020 dollars), while the ticket fare was $3.40 (equivalent to $4.64 in 2020 dollars) by using four tickets. Rural Express bus passes for adults and students, and regular senior bus passes, were also accepted. The cash fare increased to $5 in 2006, and later to $5.25. On 2 July 2012, the Rural Express fare was discontinued, with all Rural Express routes being repurposed as Express routes. Para Transpo continues to operate a rural fare zone.

=== Other prices ===
PRESTO card	$4.00 + minimum load $0.05-value
Gold Permit parking pass	$68.25 per month
Regular Park & Ride parking permit	$30.25 per month
Bikesecure	$6.00 key fob + $10.00 per month

Tickets for the O-Train light rail line were initially sold for $2 each at ticket vending machines in 2002 ($2.60 in 2016 dollars) when paying cash, lower than the $2.50 bus cash fare but pricier than the $1.70 ($2.21 in 2016 dollars) ticket fare at the time. Train tickets can be exchanged for a bus transfer on board of an OC Transpo bus. O-Train ticket prices increased over time, but remained lower compared to bus cash fares until July 2013, when OC Transpo increased O-Train ticket prices from $2.85 to $3.40 to match the bus cash fare. This represents an increase of over 19% and happened after the Presto card launch completed. This card is accepted at O-Train stations for a lower train fare. Bus tickets and DayPass vouchers cannot be used on the O-Train. Bus transfers, however, are accepted.

Monthly and annual passes are also available for all route classes with cost differences for adults, students, and seniors. Passes require an OC Transpo photo ID card, which is available at extra cost. Additionally, Ecopasses (reduced-rate monthly passes) are available through participating employers in the city, providing applicable OC Transpo riders with single-card indefinite passes in exchange for a flat bi-weekly, semi-monthly or monthly payroll deduction.

In July 2008, fares were increased by 7.5% because of a shortage in funding for the City of Ottawa. This fare hike was supposed to be in effect until 2010 including a 6.5% hike in 2009. This meant Ottawa residents saw regular adult passes rise from $73 a month to $81 and adult express passes from $90 to $101 a month. However, cash fares remained the same.

On 18 January 2013, OC Transpo starting the final testing of its Presto Card deployment as part of the NEXT-ON program. Ten thousand customers were able to order a Presto Card online or pick one up at select OC Transpo transitway stations, activate it, and use it for OC Transpo's final testing of the loadable cards. As of January 2013, over 10,000 Presto cards have been distributed. A limited number of Presto cards were available at Baseline Station on 22 January 2013, and at Fallowfield Station on 24 January 2013. The final full release date for Presto in Ottawa was on 18 May 2013. Cards can be either loaded with cash and used like tickets, or loaded with as a monthly pass, which unlike the photo pass, is usable by family and friends. As of 2017, yearly and monthly photo passes have been discontinued, as they are not accepted at the new fare gates being installed along the O-Train.

The Province is encouraging all Ontario transit systems to adopt Presto, and the OC Transpo installation has been complex, requiring installation of readers at the front doors of all buses and all doors of articulated and double-decker buses, as well as a computer with a Presto fare database on each bus. The database was originally refreshed every night with updates of the day's Presto fare purchases when the buses return to the garages; this required users to wait up to 24 hours before cash loaded onto their card accounts is recognized by the readers. In 2014, the readers were upgraded to refresh up to 6 times a day using cellular data. There are now new fare gates and ticket vending machines at all O-Train stations. Unlike the TTC and GO Transit facilities, OC Transpo did not launch full Presto ticket machines until November 2017, when all O-Train Line 2 stations except for Bayview featured a new fare gate system. The full machines allow riders to check and reload a card prior to boarding.

In January 2021, OC Transpo launched the Bikesecure program which allows secure bike parking spots at a select number of transit stations to be reserved for a monthly fee.

== Para Transpo ==
Para Transpo is an accessible paratransit service available to Ottawa patrons who find it extremely difficult or impossible to use the conventional OC Transpo routes. Service is provided directly to the residences of eligible users who book trip appointments with a call centre at least one day in advance. Para Transpo drivers will provide some assistance to passengers to board designated vehicle and to access building entrances.

Para Transpo operations were contracted to First Student Canada, previously operated by Laidlaw. On 1 January 2008, the City of Ottawa assumed complete control of this service.

The transit strike of 2008 did not interrupt Para Transpo service. However, Para Transpo service did encounter delays, facing the traffic increase due to the strike.

== Safety and security ==
All major stations are equipped with various safety and security features for the public, including callboxes, payphones, CCTV cameras around the stations, along with well lit and heated shelters. On train platforms, there are warning strips and barriers to keep passengers at a safe distance from the tracks. On vehicles, the newer D60lfr models were installed with passenger assistance alarms (PAAs) at the rear of the bus. They were also added on double decker busses toward the upper deck. When pressed, it will notify the operator of an emergency, incident, and/or someone in need of assistance. Other safety features on transit busses include handrails for holding when standing, and CCTV cameras providing surveillance.

=== Transecure ===
After 9 pm, Nightstop can be used to request the operator to stop at a closer location than that of a specific bus stop. OC Transpo also deploys Special Constables to patrol stations and respond to calls involving OC Transpo vehicles, stations, or property, and work in close partnership with the Ottawa Police Service.

== See also ==
- Transitway (Ottawa)
- O-Train
  - Line 1
  - Line 2
  - Line 3
  - Line 4
- Société de transport de l'Outaouais (STO) in Gatineau, Québec
