= Ottawa Transportation Commission =

Former Transit System in Ontario, Canada (1948-1973)

Ottawa Transportation Commission (OTC)

Overview
- Owner: City of Ottawa,
- Locale: Ottawa, Ontario
- Transit type: Bus service Trolleybus service Streetcar service
- Headquarters: 1500 St. Laurent Blvd. (Post 1960)

Operation
- Began operation: 1948
- Ended operation: 1973
- Number of vehicles: 328 buses (1973 estimation)

Ottawa Transportation Commission was the public transit operator for the Canadian city of Ottawa from 1948 until the creation of OC Transpo in 1973.

In December 1950 the OTC gained control and ownership of the Eastview Bus Service and absorbed all bus lines, buses and the garage.

== Fleet ==
Model	Year	Fleet Number(s)	Number in Fleet	Transmission	Notes
Mack CW	1939	121-126	6	?	Ex-Ottawa Electric Railway same numbers.
Mack CW	1940	128	1	?	Ex-Ottawa Electric Railway same numbers.
Ford 09B	1940	151-156, 158-161	10	?	Ex-Ottawa Electric Railway same numbers.
Mack LD	1941	130-136, 138-140	10		Ex-Ottawa Electric Railway same numbers. Retired 1960-1961.
Ford	1941	172	1	?	Ex-Eastview Bus Service ?. Acquired 1950.
Reo 56TD	1942	55-58	4	?	Ex-Eastview Bus Service 50, 60, 64 & 68. Acquired in 1950.
Reo 56TD	1942	59-60	2	?	Ex-Uplands Bus Line 22 and 24. Acquired in 1951.
Ford	1943	164, 166-171	7		Ex-Eastview Bus Service ?, 166-167, ?, ?, ? & ?. Acquired in 1950. Retired in 1959.
Ford	1944	165	1	?	Ex-Eastview Bus Service ?. Acquired in 1950.
CC&F C-36	1945	195-200	6	?	Ex-London Transportation Commission 204-209. Bought in 1960.
Reo 96HT	1946	50-51	2		Ex-Eastview Bus Service 50 and 52. Acquired in 1950.
Reo 96HT	1946	61-62	2	?	Ex-Uplands Bus Line 26 and 30. Acquired in 1951.
CC&F C-36	1946	201-206, 208-216, 218-222	20	?	Ex-Ottawa Electric Railway same numbers.
CC&F IC-41	1946	300	1		Ex-Ottawa Electric Railway same number. Used for sightseeing. Retired in 1959.
Reo 96HT	1947	52-54	3	?	Ex-Eastview Bus Service 54, 56 and 58. Acquired in 1950.
Reo 96HT	1947	63-64	2	?	Ex-Uplands Bus Line 32 and ?. Acquired in 1951.
Ford	1947	162-163	2	?	Ex-Cyrville Bus 10 and 12. Acquired in 1950. Retired in 1959.
White 798	1948	80-83	4	?	Ex-Nepean Bus Lines same numbers. Acquired in 1949. Retired in 1957
CC&F C-36	1948	223-226, 228-232	9	?	Ex-Ottawa Electric Railway same numbers. Retired in 1965.
Twin 38-S	1948	327	1	?	Ex-Eastview Bus Service 92. Acquired in 1950.
Twin 41-S	1948	328	1		Ex-Eastview Bus Service 90. Acquired in 1950. Retired in 1964.
CC&F C-36	1949	233-241	9	?
Twin 44-S	1949	310-319	10		Retired in 1965.
Twin 38-S	1949	329	1	?	Ex-Eastview Bus Service 94. Acquired in 1950. Retired in 1964.
CC&F 36-A	1950	227	1	?	Ex-Brantford Transit 501. Bought in 1953. Retired in 1961.
CC&F 36-A	1950	242-247	6	?
Twin 41-S	1950	320-321	2	?	Ordered by Uplands Bus Line but delivered to OTC.
Twin 45-S	1950	322-326	5		Retired in 1967.
CC&F CD-44A	1952	248-267	20	?
CC&F CD-44A	1953	268-271	4	?	?
CC&F CD-44A	1954	272-285	14	?	?
GMC TDH-4512	1955	400-420	21	?	To OC Transpo 400-420.
CC&F CD-52	1957	5701-5715	15		Retired in 1970
GMC TDH-5105	1959	5101-5110	10	?	*5101 preserved *To OC Transpo 5101-5110.
GMC TDH-5105	1959	5901-5997	97	?	*5931 preserved *To OC Transpo 5901-5997.
GMC TDH-5301	1961	6101-6112	12	?	*6101 preserved *To OC Transpo 6101-6112.
GMC TDH-5301	1962	6221-6230	10	?	*Ex 6201-6210. *To OC Transpo 6221-6230.
GMC TDH-5303	1963	6331-6340	10	?	To OC Transpo 6331-6340.
GMC TDH-5303	1964	6441-6452	12	?	To OC Transpo 6441-6452.
GMC TDH-5303	1965	6561-6573	13	?	To OC Transpo 6561-6573.
GMC TDH-5303	1966	6674-6697	24	?	To OC Transpo 6674-6697.
GMC TDH-5303	1967	671-679 and 6710-6726	26	?	To OC Transpo 671-679 and 6710-6726.
GMC TDH-5305	1968	6831-6850	20	?	To OC Transpo 6831-6850.
GMC TDH-5305	1969	6961-6990	30	?	To OC Transpo 6961-6990.
Western Flyer D700A	1970	701-703	3	?	Leased 1970-1972 then bought in 1972.; To OC Transpo 8701-8703.
GMC TDH-5305	1970	7001-7020	20	?	To OC Transpo 7001-7020.
GMC TDH-5305	1971	7121-7140	20	?	To OC Transpo 7121-7140.

=== Electric Trolley Buses ===
Trolley Bus operation began December 15, 1951 Using overhead wires left over from the streetcar system, with buses being exclusively used along the former Bronson line. Service ran until June 27, 1959 when it was replaced by diesel buses and overhead wires were removed. The buses were sold to the Toronto and Kitchener

Model	Year	Fleet Number(s)	Number in Fleet	Motor	Notes
CC&F T-48A	1951	2001-2010	10	Electric Motor Powered by overhead lines	2001-2005 sold to Kitchener Transit and 2006-2010 sold to Toronto Transit Commission in 1959

=== Demo Buses ===
Model	Year	Fleet Number(s)	Thumbnail	Transmission	Notes
GMDD TDH-5301	1961	61	?	?	Arrived 1961?
CC&F TD-51	1960	500	?	?	Arrived 1960?
Canadair-Flxible CL-218	1965	5097	?	?	Montreal Transportation Commission. Arrived ?.

== Streetcar Service ==
OTC took over streetcar operations from the Ottawa Electric Railway, but they were gradually abandoned for trolley bus and bus operations. Some streetcars were sold to the Toronto Transit Commission. the service ran until May 1, 1959 with tracks and wires being removed shortly after. wires along Bronson Ave remained as the OTC begain trolley bus operation.

Model	Year	Fleet Number(s)	Number in Fleet	Length	Trucks	Notes
Ottawa Car Company 500 Series	1911	650	1	49'6"	Brill 27-FE-1	DTSE 2-man wood car acquired from the Ottawa Electric Railway. Retired 1953.
Ottawa Car Company 600 Series	1913	651-656, 658-666, 668-669, 680-682	20	49'6"	Brill 27-FE-1	DTSE 1 or 2-man steel cars acquired from the Ottawa Electric Railway. Retired 1954-1958.
Ottawa Car Company 600 Series	1915	683-686, 688-690, 693-695	10	49'6"	Brill 27-FE-1	DTSE 1 or 2-man steel cars acquired from the Ottawa Electric Railway. Retired 1954-1959.
Ottawa Car Company 600 Series	1917	691-692, 696	3	49'6"	Brill 27-FE-1	DTSE 1 or 2-man steel cars acquired from the Ottawa Electric Railway. Retired 1954-1958. 696 preserved by OC Transpo, being restored.
Ottawa Car Company 800 Series	1924-1925	800-821	2	45'3"	CC&F F-790 (Brill 77-E)	DTSE 1 or 2-man steel cars acquired from the Ottawa Electric Railway. Retired 1959.
Ottawa Car Company 800 Series	1926	822-843	22	45'3"	CC&F F-790 (Brill 77-E)	DTSE 1 or 2-man steel cars acquired from the Ottawa Electric Railway. Retired 1958-59. 825 preserved by Seashore Trolley Museum, 829 sold to a Toronto restaurant, front third of 831 bought by OC Transpo in 1985 but scrapped 1999.
Ottawa Car Company 800 Series	1927	850-869, 880-881	22	45'3"	CC&F F-790 (Brill 77-E)	DTSE 1 or 2-man steel cars acquired from the Ottawa Electric Railway. Retired 1959. 854 preserved by Canada Science & Tech Museum, 859 preserved by Canadian Railway Museum.
Ottawa Car Company 900 Series	1933	901-906, 908-910	9	45'3"	Brill 77-E	DTSE 1-man steel cars acquired from the Ottawa Electric Railway. Retired 1959. #905 preserved and to be restored.
Ottawa Car Company 900 Series	1934	911-916, 918-923	12	45'3"	Brill 77-E	DTSE 1-man steel cars acquired from the Ottawa Electric Railway. Retired 1959. #921 is reported to be at Lac Huot, QC
Ottawa Car Company 1000 Series	1947	1000-1003	4	45'6"	Brill 77-E	DTSE Closed 1-man steel cars acquired from the Ottawa Electric Railway. Retired 1959.
