= Chaudière Bridge =

Chaudière Bridge Pont de la Chaudière
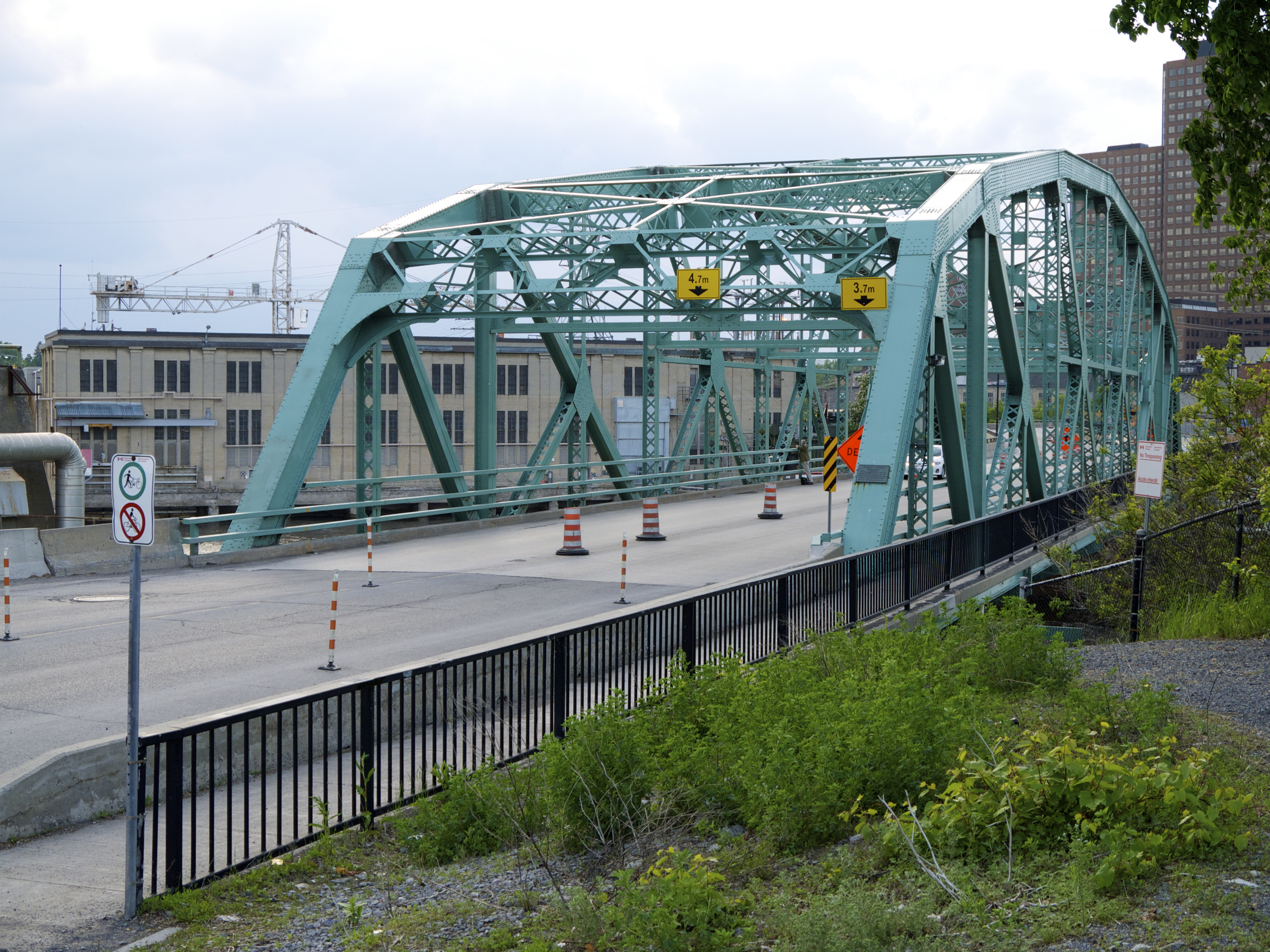
- Chaudière Bridge in 2013, viewed from its southern end in Ottawa
- Coordinates: 45°25′16″N 75°43′07″W
- Carries: 2 lanes connecting Rue Eddy and Booth Street, pedestrian walkway
- Crosses: Ottawa River
- Owner: Government of Canada
- Maintained by: Public Services and Procurement Canada

Location
- Interactive map of Chaudière Bridge

The Chaudière Bridge (French: Pont de la Chaudière) crosses the Ottawa River about 1 km (0.6 mi) west of Parliament Hill, joining the communities of Gatineau, Quebec, and Ottawa, Ontario, linking Rue Eddy in the Hull sector of Gatineau and Booth Street in Ottawa. The bridge is one portion of multiple spans constituting the Chaudière Crossing, which still contain portions of the first bridge linking Ottawa with Hull dating back to the time of Colonel By in the 1820s.

The bridge passes through the E.B. Eddy Company complex adjacent to the Chaudière Falls, from which the bridge gets its name.

== Union Bridge ==
The Chaudière Bridge's earliest predecessor, the 8 span "Union Bridge" was completed under Colonel By's direction in September 1828; the first bridge to link the two young towns. (Its first span, completed January 11, 1827, had been their second attempt at that site, for the first one had collapsed the previous November.) While the main span was a wooden arch, masonry arches were also used for the smaller spans. Thomas McKay had been given contracts to construct two of its stone arches. One of Thomas Burrowes' first assignments during the construction of the Rideau Canal was to help plan and construct the Union Bridge. The bridge had been needed during the construction of the Rideau Canal because Colonel By's initial base of operations was initially in Wright's Town (Hull). The bridge received its name to "symbolize the joining of the Provinces of Upper Canada and Lower Canada". The 212-foot (65 m) wooden truss bridge which spanned the Chaudière Falls collapsed on May 18, 1836. A ferry service was temporarily used until a new bridge was opened in 1843.

Over the years, the main span had to be replaced several times, however much of the original (1827–1828) spans remained in place. The changes that follow refer mostly to the replacement of the main span.

The Union Suspension Bridge, opened on September 17, 1843 (possibly September 17, 1844), was a 242-foot (74 m) iron bridge built by Alexander Christie, and designed by Samuel Keefer until 1889 when it was again rebuilt using steel truss construction. The current steel bridge was built by the Dominion Bridge Company in 1919.

== Deteriorated condition ==
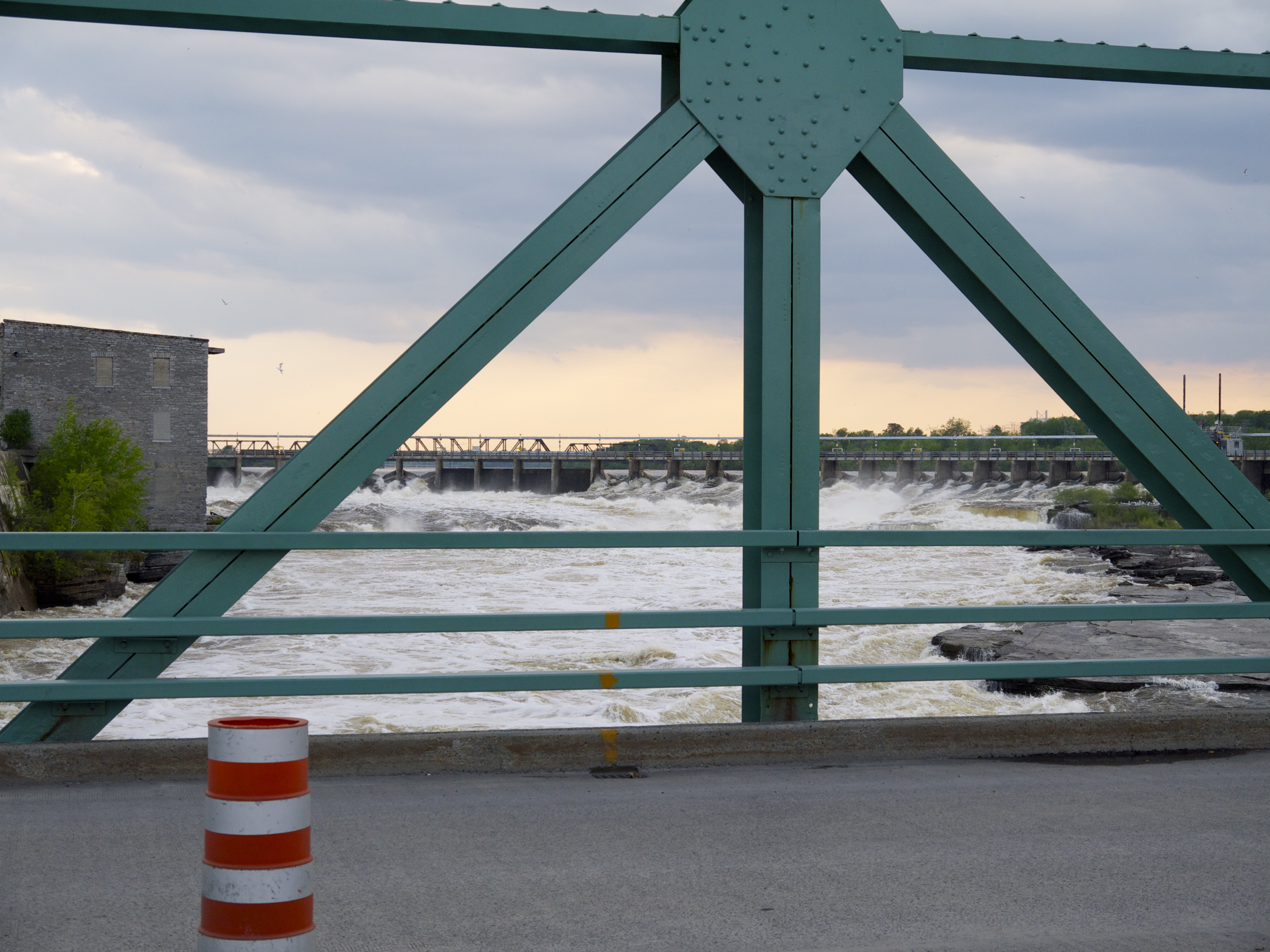
View looking west of the bridge towards Chaudière Falls

Several of the masonry arches dating from 1828 are still in use, just to the north of the current steel bridge. On December 3, 2008, Public Works and Government Services Canada closed the bridge for vehicular and pedestrian traffic after an inspection revealed deterioration in the masonry arches. It was closed immediately in both directions "until further notice." The closure affected commuting across the Ottawa River, including OC Transpo bus routes which run across the bridge and stop in front of the government offices at Terrasses de la Chaudière. The bridge was partially re-opened one week later with weight restrictions and a reduced speed limit.

The bridge work went under review by the federal government and a decision to repair the bridge spans was made. Consultants used computer-simulations to model the stress and the condition of the arches. Ottawa historian John Taylor had proposed that the government use the opportunity to open up the area to views of the Falls.

In May 2009 the bridge was reopened after repairs to the concrete spans.

== 2019 flood closure ==
In late April 2019, authorities announced that the bridge would be closed due to concerns over rising water level caused by the 2019 flood.

== Gallery ==
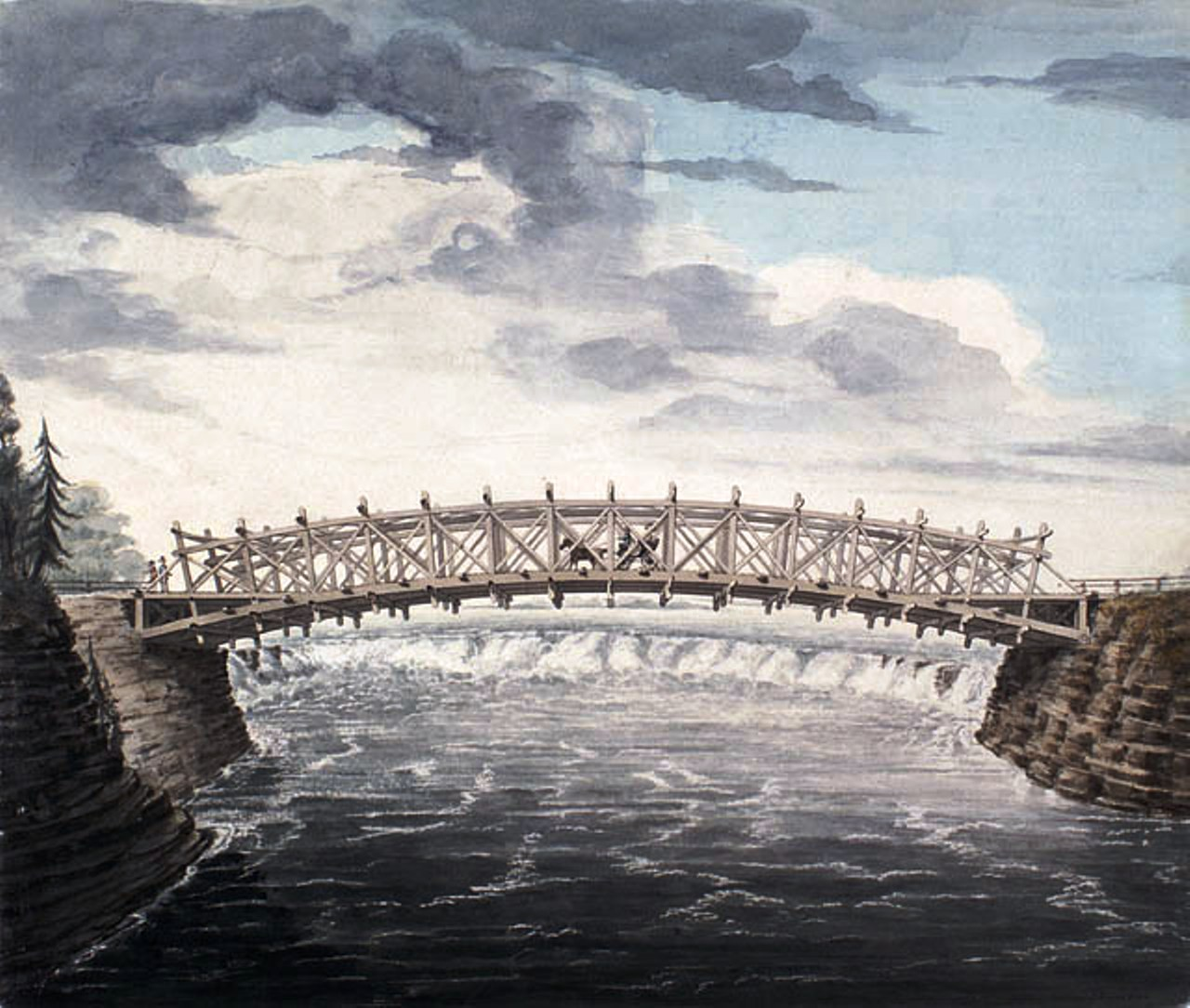
The first bridge with its main wooden arch (1828)

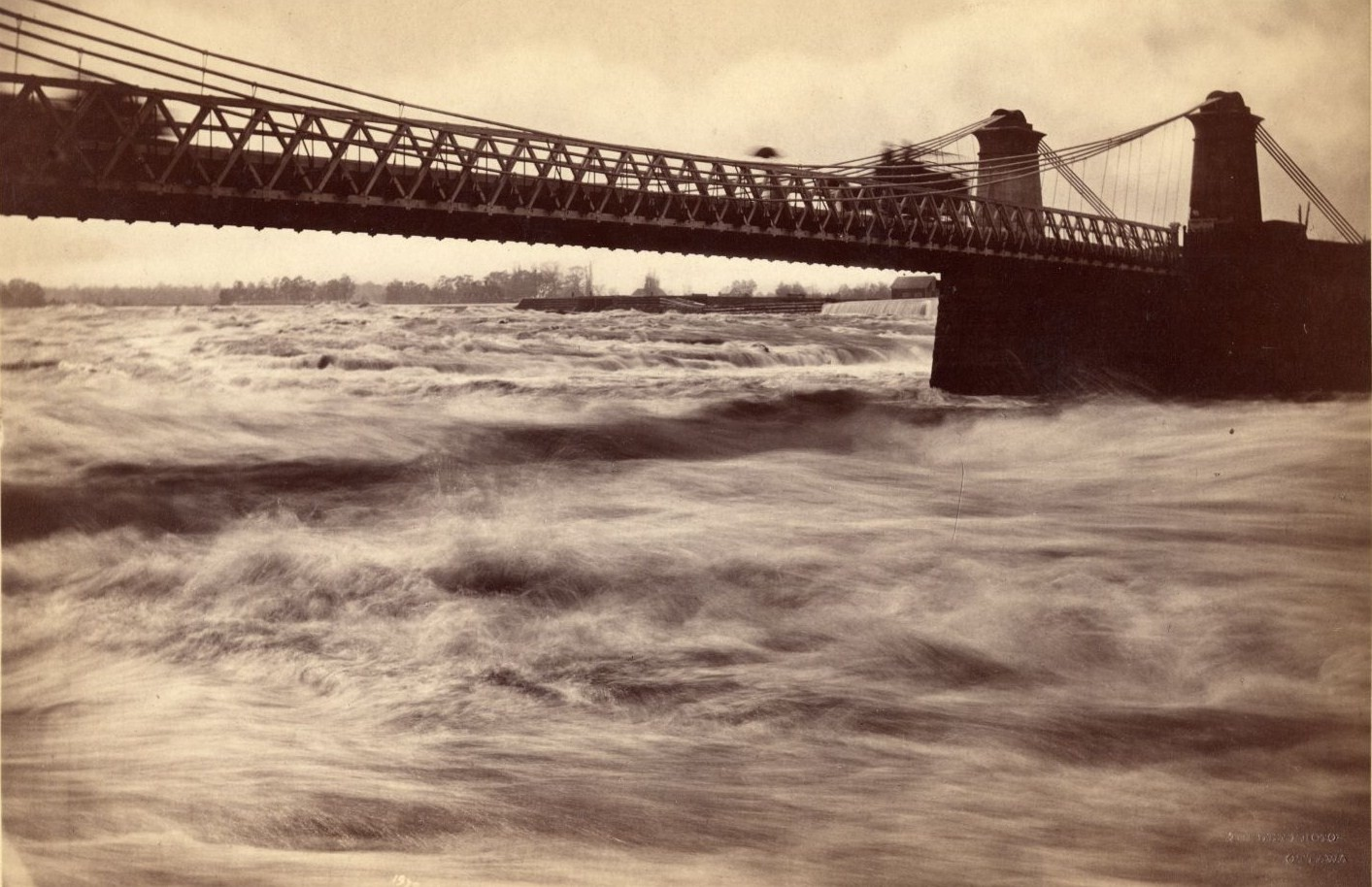
The second version, a suspension bridge (1870)

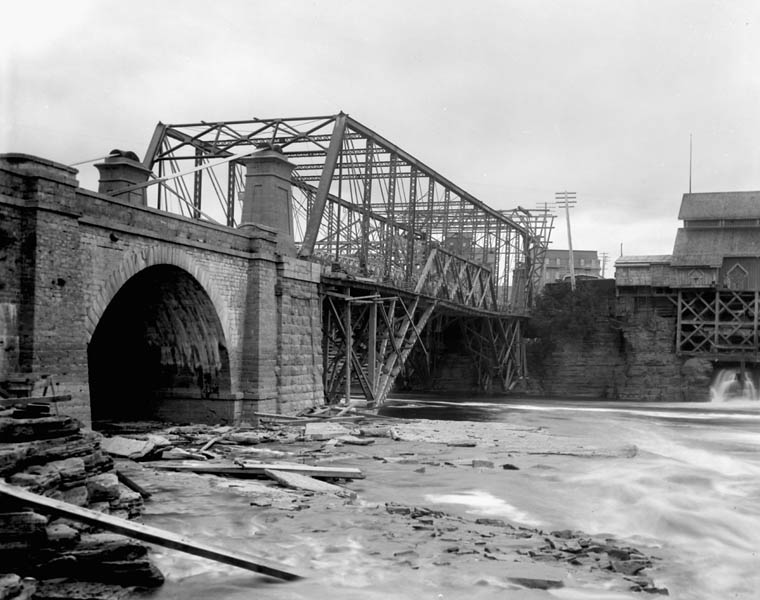
The third version under construction, a steel truss bridge (1892)

== See also ==
- List of bridges in Ottawa
- List of bridges in Canada
- List of crossings of the Ottawa River
