= Riverview, Ottawa =

Riverview
- Neighbourhood
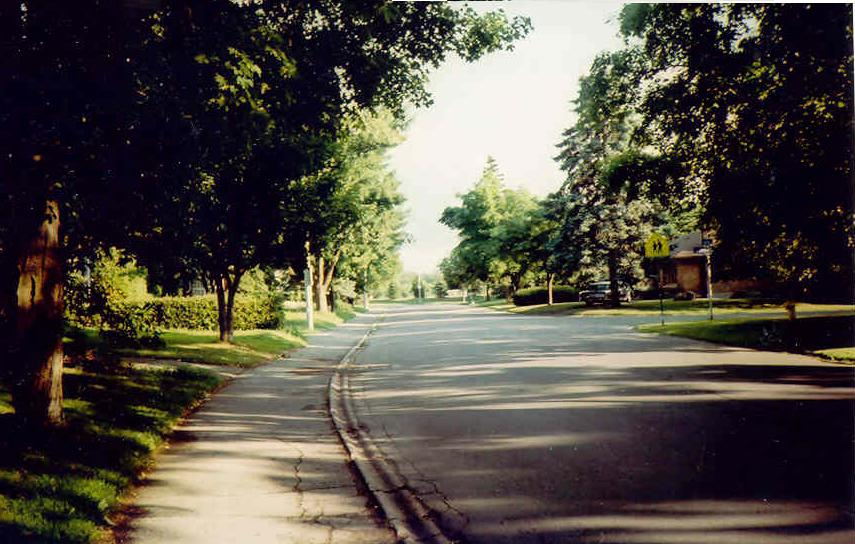
- A suburban street in Riverview

- Location within Ottawa
- Coordinates: 45°24′30″N 75°39′00″W
- Country: Canada
- Province: Ontario
- City: Ottawa
- First Property Owner's Assoc. Meeting: Nov. 17, 1952

Government
  - Governing body: Riverview Park Community Association
  - President: Bryan Orendorff
  - MP: David McGuinty
  - MPP: John Fraser
  - Councillors: Marty Carr, Shawn Menard

Area
  - Total: 5.87 km^{2} (2.27 sq mi)
- Elevation: 75 m (246 ft)

Population (2016)
  - Total: 13,113
  - Density: 2,233.9/km^{2} (5,786/sq mi)
- Canada 2021 Census
- Time zone: UTC−5 (Eastern (EST))
  - Summer (DST): UTC−4 (EDT)
- Forward sortation area: K1G
- Website: https://rpca.wordpress.com/

Riverview (also known as Riverview Park) is a neighbourhood in Ottawa, Ontario, Canada. It is southeast of the downtown adjacent to the Rideau River, its location on which is its namesake. The 2021 Census population of Riverview is 13,113.

== Definition ==
As defined by the Riverview Park Community Association, the neighbourhood is bounded on the west by the Rideau River, on the north by the CN railway tracks, on the east by St. Laurent Boulevard, and on the south by Smyth Road. Riverview is located adjacent to Old Ottawa East on the west (across the Rideau River), on the north by Eastway Gardens, on the south by Alta Vista and on the east by Sheffield Glen.

== History ==
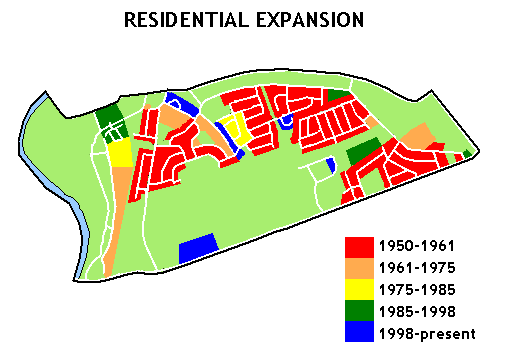
Urban expansion in Riverview from 1950 to 2005.

The area now known as Riverview was mostly farmland belonging to the Township of Gloucester until it was annexed by the city of Ottawa in 1950. During this time, the only settlement was on the northern edge of what is today Riverview, and was the village of Hurdman's Bridge. There were also some buildings along River Road (today's Riverside Drive) and the CN railway along the Rideau River. The neighbourhood was established in 1952 on a Central Mortgage and Housing Corporation plan. In the 1950s the neighbourhood was primarily built-up to serve the post-war baby boom era. Hurdman's Bridge would be eventually demolished to make way for a parkland, rail land, and the new Queensway freeway. Over the next few decades, housing for lower class and lower-middle-class people were also built in the mostly middle-class neighbourhood. This included a large number of apartment buildings lining Riverside Drive, the Alta Vista apartments, community housing on Station Boulevard and on Russell Road. Construction of low-rent housing on Station Boulevard was opposed by many of the community's residents, as well as both of the area's aldermen. After this stage of development, townhouses were built in various locations of the neighbourhood. More recent developments are mostly middle-class developments, and also for retired people. The post-war housing is very heterogeneous, but newer developments are more homogeneous in character.

Timeline

- January 1, 1950: Area annexed by Ottawa from Gloucester Township
- July 14, 1950: Mayor E. A. Bourque announces that the city had come to an agreement with the Grey Nuns of the Cross (who operated a novitiate building on the current site of Alta Vista Towers) to build a development of 1,200 homes in the Hurdman's Bridge area.
- September 10, 1951: The sale of individual lots in the western part of the neighbourhood begins, with most being sold for $250. That same year, Alta Vista Drive is re-named from Churchill Drive.
- November 17, 1952: First meeting of the Riverview Park Property Owners Association.
- 1953: The Ottawa Transit Commission (OTC) began a bus line to the neighbourhood. A skating rink at the future site of Riverview Public School is approved by city council, to be operated by the community association.
- 1954: Immaculate Heart of Mary Church is built on Alta Vista Drive.
- 1955: Riverview Public School is built on Knox Crescent. On December 19th, a new Hurdman's Bridge is opened.
- April 11, 1956: The Alta Vista Shopping Centre on Alta Vista Drive is opened. Its first anchor store was Clover Farm Food Market.
- August 1956: Apartments at the corner of Dorion Avenue and Alta Vista are completed on land purchased by the Central Mortgage and Housing Corporation.
- November 18, 1956: The Don Bosco French Catholic school on Drake Avenue is officially blessed. It would later be re-named De-la-Nativité and closed in 1980.
- 1957: Robert Campeau began selling homes in the eastern part of the neighbourhood.
- 1959: The first polio inoculation clinic is set up in the neighbourhood at Immaculate Heart of Mary Church. Later that year, community members opposed the construction of apartment buildings on Coronation Avenue.
- January 17, 1961: Nativite de Notre-Seigneur-Jesus-Christ church is opened.
- August 30, 1961: The George McIlraith Bridge is completed, connecting the neighbourhood with Old Ottawa South via Smyth Road.
- October 15, 1961: St. Christopher Catholic School on Lindsay Street is officially blessed. It closed in 1977.
- 1961: The National Defence Medical Centre on Alta Vista Drive is completed.
- 1962: University of Ottawa High School opens on Riverside Drive. The site is now Lycée Claudel d'Ottawa
- May 1963: The city approves a public housing development (named Blair Court) on Station Boulevard.
- 1964: Riverview Park on Knox Crescent is dedicated.
- 1968: Trinity Church of the Nazarene moves to its current location on Avalon Place.
- May 1969: The first phase of Alta Vista Towers begins development on an 11-acre site on Alta Vista Drive at the site of the Grey Nuns building. The cost of the three-phase development was $6,000,000 and took 26 months to complete.
- October 1969: The demolition of the Grey Nuns Novitiate Hurdman's Bridge begins.
- October 2, 1970: The Canadian Medical Association Headquarters is opened on Alta Vista Drive.
- October 5, 1970: The Canada Post Ottawa Mail Processing Plant is opened on Caledon Place (now Sir Sandford Fleming Avenue).
- 1970: During the October Crisis, the Royal Canadian Army tank brigade sets up on the current site of the General Hospital Campus.
- 1972: Lycée Claudel d'Ottawa opens on Riverside Drive (now Lycée Place) in buildings that previously housed the University of Ottawa High School.
- May 17, 1974: The Children's Hospital of Eastern Ontario (CHEO) opens on Smyth Road.
- 1976: The Canadian Dental Association Head Office is opened on Alta Vista Drive.
- 1977: Dempsey Community Centre is dedicated.
- 1979: Resident of Abbey Road begin the first Neighbourhood Watch program in the city.
- 1980: The Ottawa General Hospital is opened on Smyth Road.
- 1983: The speedskating oval at Balena Park is relocated to Brewer Park in Old Ottawa South.
- June 1983: Ottawa's Ronald McDonald House is opened.
- 1985: Ottawa Montessori School purchases two schools.
- July 1986: The Rotary Club of Ottawa opens a motel "Rotel" on the grounds of the General Hospital for hospital accommodation at the General and CHEO.
- 1986: A condominium complex is built by Aselford-Martin Ltd on Riverside Drive. It is now known as the Rivieras.
- August 31, 1987: The Canadian Blood Services building is officially opened on Alta Vista. It was known as the Canadian Red Cross until 1998.
- 1988: The Canadian Pharmacists Association building is opened on Alta Vista.

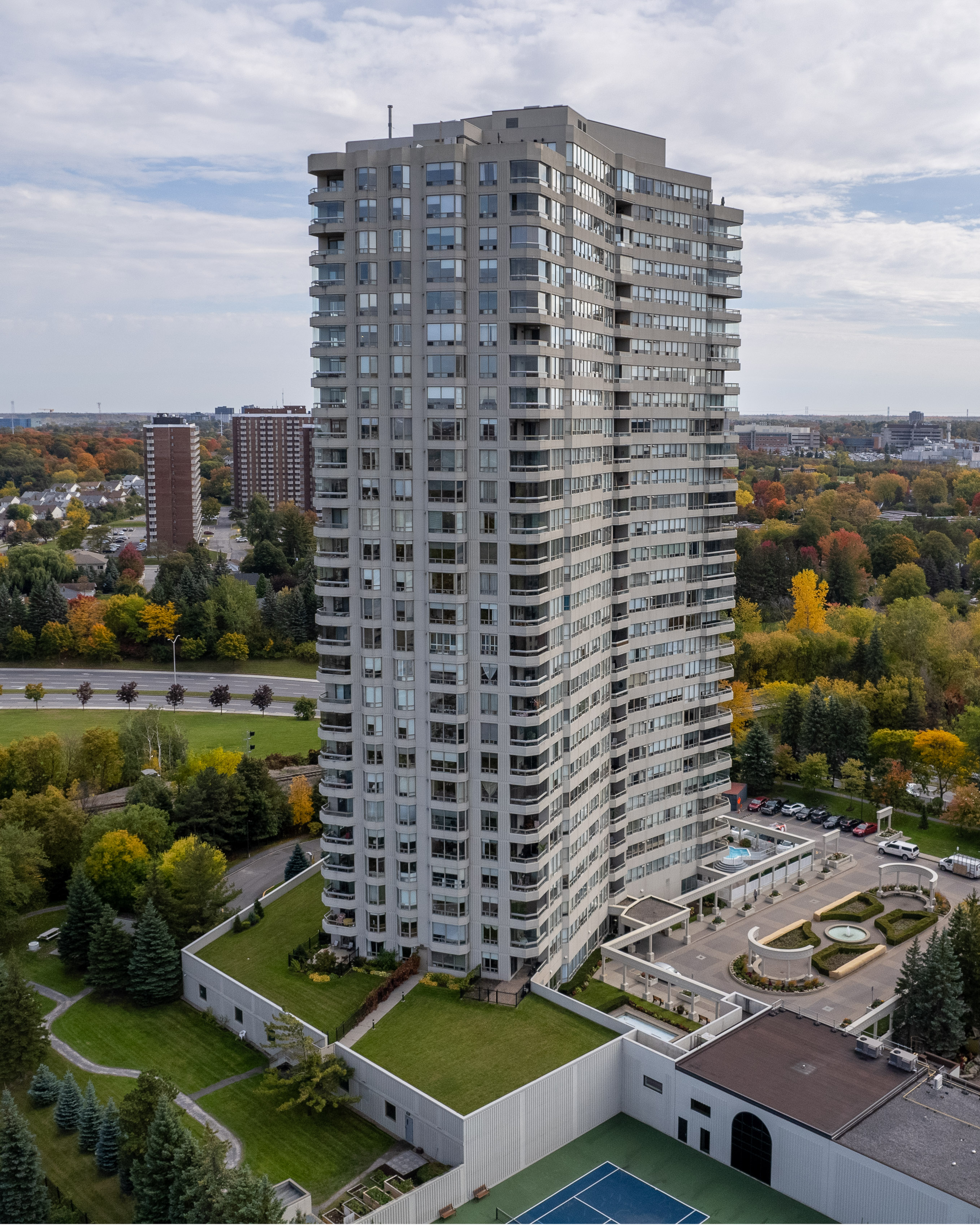
The Classics

- 1990: The Classics condominiums are constructed, the tallest buildings in the neighbourhood and 13th tallest in the region.
- 1992: The TransAlta co-generation plant begins operation.
- 1983: The speedskating oval at Balena Park is relocated to Brewer Park in Old Ottawa South.
- 1993: A helicopter pad is established next to CHEO.
- 1994: The Franco Cité French Catholic high school is opened on Smyth Road. Construction of the Perley and Rideau Veterans' Health Centre begins. The Conference Board of Canada building opens on Smyth Road.
- 1995: The "Action Committee of the Riverview Park" holds meetings to prevent Petro Canada from building a gas bar at the corner of Alta Vista and Dorion Avenue.
- 1998: The Riverview Park Community Association adopts Alda Burt, Balena, Coronation, Dale, Hutton and Riverview parks as part of the city's adopt a park program. The Rideau Veterans Memorial Park is dedicated. The community association attempts to stop the construction of townhomes on Bathurst Avenue.
- 2001: The first corn roast is held at Balena Park. The redevelopment and beautification of Dale Park is completed. The MD Financial Services Building on Alta Vista is opened.
- 2003: A land swap takes place between the City of Ottawa and the National Capital Commission on Industrial Avenue between Alta Vista and Riverside. It would later become the Cancer Survivor's Park. Mosquitoes in the neighbourhood test positive for the West Nile Virus.
- 2004: Townhouses are built at the corner of Rolland and Alta Vista as part of the "Alta Vista Crossing" development. Alta Vista Manor is opened on Peter Morand Crescent.
- September 24, 2008: The Ottawa Cancer Survivor Park is dedicated.
- 2009: The Oakpark Retirement Community is built on Valour Drive. The Ottawa Hospital Cancer Centre opens.
- 2011: The Cancer Survivorship Centre at Maplesoft House opens on the site of the Cancer Survivor's Park.
- 2013: The first phase of the "Alta Vista Ridge" development opens on Russell Road.
- October 24, 2013: The official opening of the Maplewood Retirement Community.
- 2014: The "Poet's Pathway" puts up an engraved plaque at Coronation Park.
- 2015: Members of the community opposed the re-zoning of four houses on Balena Avenue into businesses. Residents are given notice of the construction of the "Hospital Link Road".
- March 13, 2017: Local streets change names (the southern section of Botsford becomes "Botsford South"; Blair Street becomes "Neighbourhood Way").

== Features ==
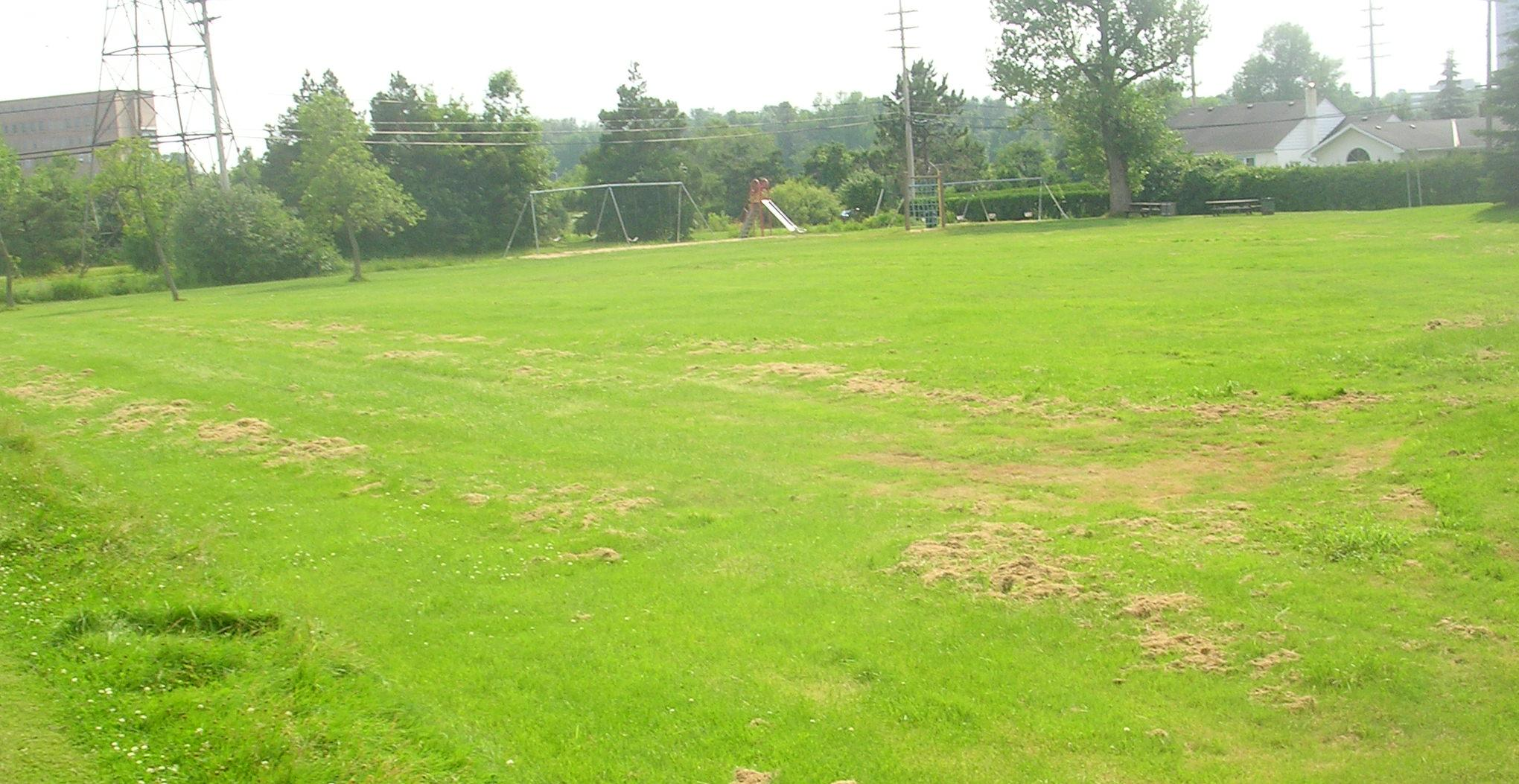
Riverview Park

Riverview is home to a number of hospitals, thanks to its central location. These include the Children's Hospital of Eastern Ontario and the Ottawa General Hospital. The Riverside Hospital is also nearby, and the neighbourhood is also home to the National Defence Medical Centre, the Ottawa Rehabilitation Centre and the Perley and Rideau Veteran's Health Centre.

Parks in Riverview include Dale Park, Hurdman Park, Balena Park, Riverview Park, Coronation Park and Hutton Park. Many of these are maintained by the Riverview Park Community Association.

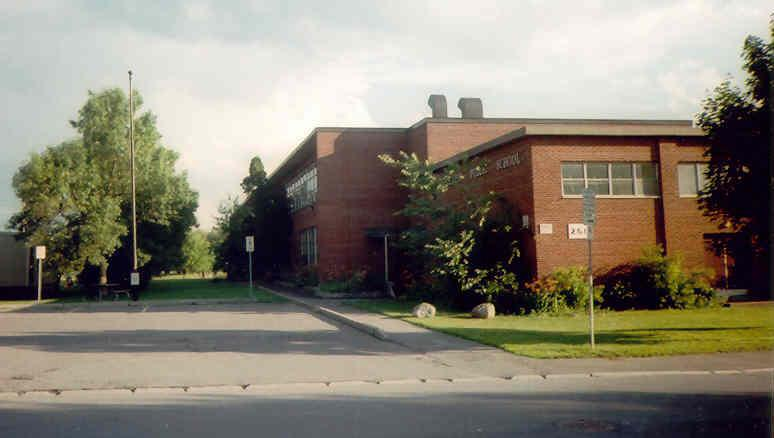
Riverview Alternative Public School on Knox Crescent in Riverview

Riverview is home to a diversity of schools. There is one French elementary school (Lycée Claudel), a French Catholic High School (Franco Cité), an English alternative education school (Riverview), an English public school (Vincent Massey), and a private Montessori school. There are also five churches, a fire hall, a community centre (Dempsey), two shopping areas, and a number of parks. Riverview is also served by three transitway stations: Hurdman, Lycée Claudel and Smyth. Riverview is home to one of the oldest shopping centres in Ottawa, in the Alta Vista Shopping Centre. Riverview is also home to the St-Laurent-Russell Shopping Centre. The neighbourhood is served by the Dempsey Community Centre and is home to the Ottawa Life Sciences Technology Park.

The Riverview Park Community Association produced a free monthly newspaper for the neighbourhood, called Riverviews. When Riverviews stopped being published in December 2008, the "Riverview Park Review" became the community's new independent newspaper.

== Sub neighbourhoods ==
Riverside

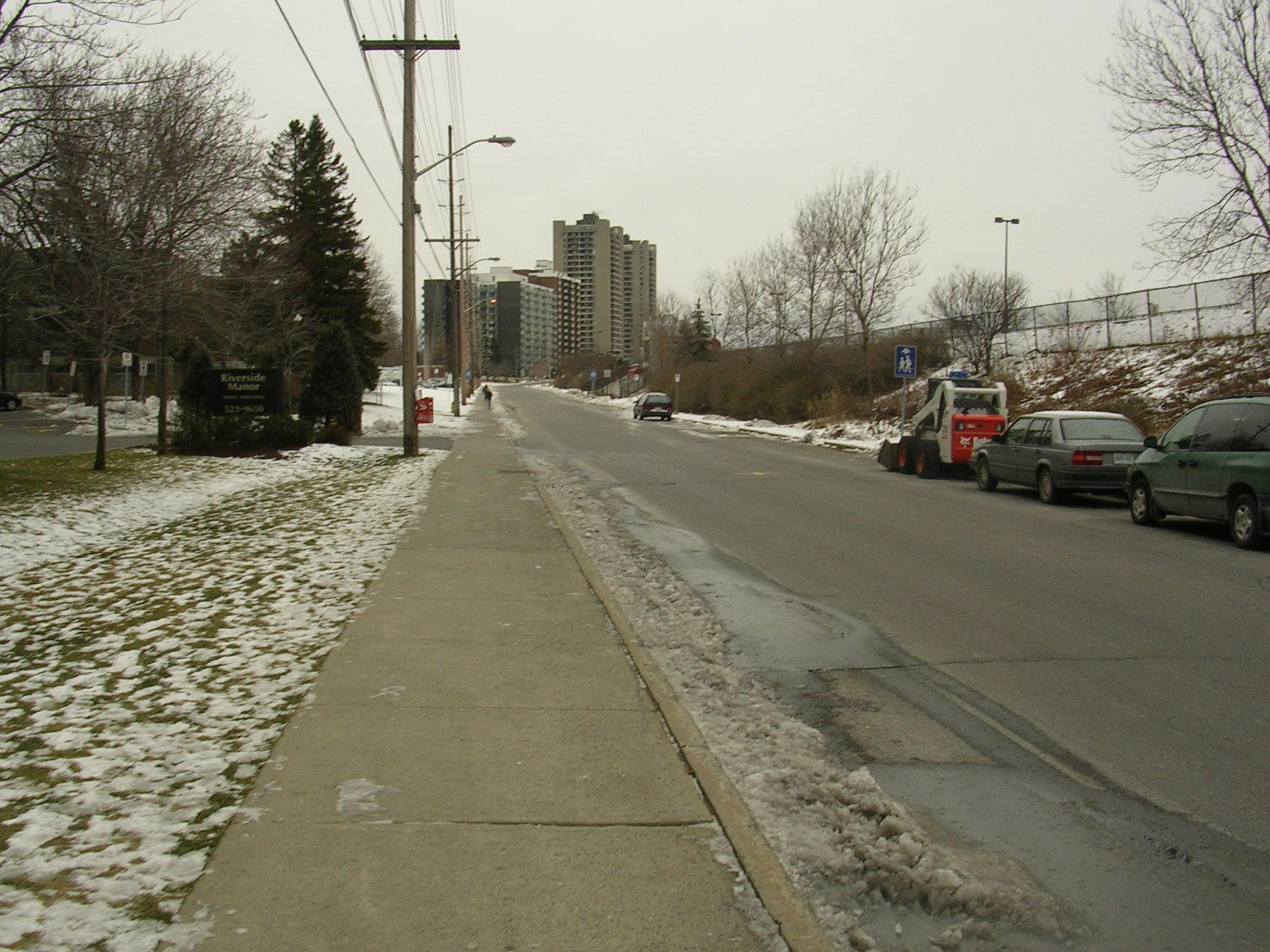
Old Riverside Drive (this segment renamed Lycée Place in 2019)

The Riverside neighbourhood consists of the area west of the CN Railway. Unlike the rest of Riverview, the area is part of Capital Ward, while the rest of the neighbourhood is in Alta Vista Ward. The Riverside neighbourhood is mostly all apartment buildings or condominiums, except for a few townhouses. The apartment buildings line the old alignment of Riverside Drive which was bypassed in the 1980s. The old alignment of Riverside was bifurcated in the late 2010s by the Hospital Link road, and the northern segment was renamed Lycée Place and the southern segment was renamed Frobisher Lane. The neighbourhood is home to the Lycée Claudel school and borders on the Rideau River.

The Riviera Apartment Complex located north of Riverside Drive next to Hurdman Station is a condominium complex which is home to many of Ottawa's upper class. Despite being a gated community, the complex was home to a triple homicide on June 29, 2007.

The area is home to about 1/3 of all Riverview residents. The population as of the Canada 2011 Census of this area was 4,076. This area is home to a large Arab Canadian population. Of the 4076 inhabitants of this area, 951 people live in the Riviera Condominiums.

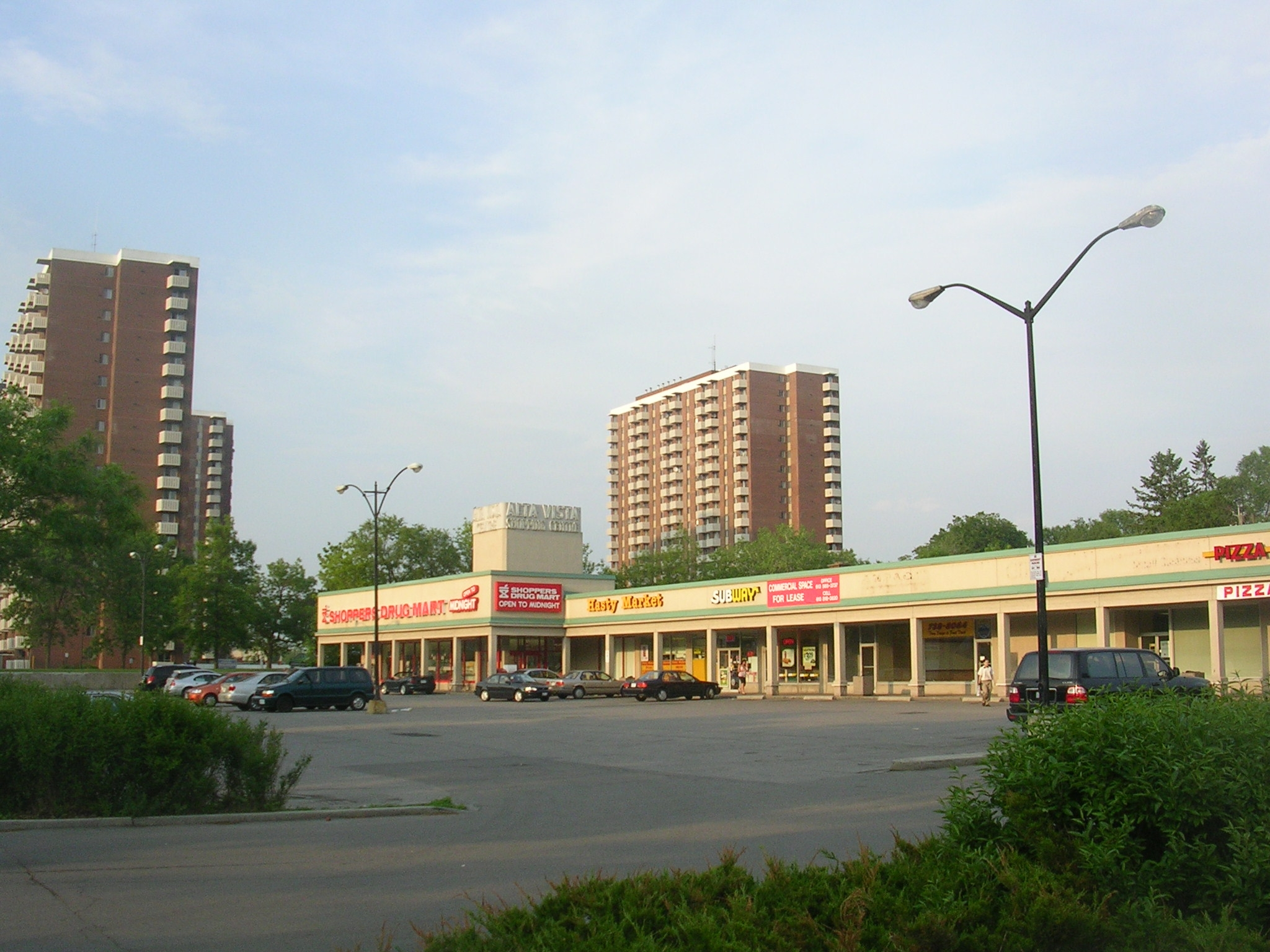
Alta Vista Shopping Centre in the foreground with the Alta Vista Towers in the background.

Alta Vista (Riverview West)
This area of the neighbourhood should not be confused with the Alta Vista neighbourhood to the south. This part of the neighbourhood is located west of Station Boulevard, but does not include it. The central focal point of this area is the Alta Vista Shopping Centre, and it is also home to the Alta Vista Towers. It is home to Riverview Alternative Public School and the Ottawa Montessori School. Mostly built in the 1950s and 1960s, it has one new subdivision off Rolland Avenue. This area is home to Dale Park, which has a tennis facility in the summer and has an outdoor ice rink in the winter. Located adjacent to Riverview School is Riverview Park, which is named for the neighbourhood.

Coronation/Balena
This area is in the central part of the neighbourhood. It is mostly middle class, except for townhouses built in the 1980s. These are located on Pixley and Renova Privates, and on Avalon Place. The rest of the area is made up of post-war housing, except for new developments on the east side of Station Boulevard and along Avalon Place, and on Sonata Place and on the south side of Bathurst Avenue. This region is home to three churches, and two parks; Coronation and Balena Park. Balena has an outdoor swimming pool and a baseball diamond.

Blair Court (Station Boulevard)

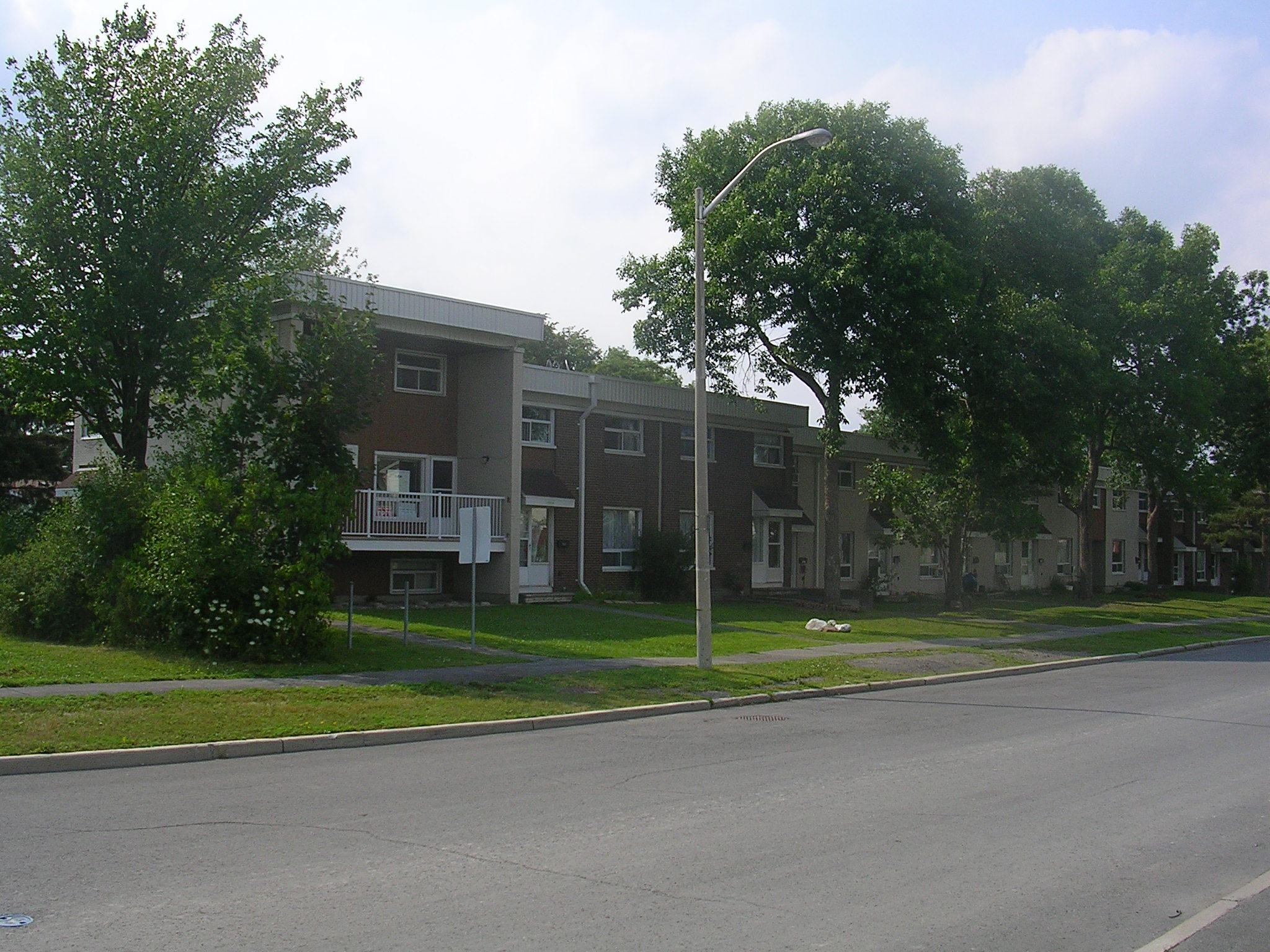
A row of public housing on Station Boulevard

The Blair Court area exists solely on the west side of Station Boulevard, and on Blair Street. It is home of lower-class public housing built in the 1960s and is home to many immigrants and visible minorities.

Riverview East
The eastern part of Riverview is a contrast to the rest of the neighbourhood because of its straight parallel streets. It has access on the west to Balena Park, and has new townhouses on its north side off Coronation Avenue. The Perley and Rideau Veterans' home is located on the south.

Faircrest Heights (North)
The southwest is the part of Riverview that is home to the majority of all the hospitals and the Medical Centre. It was also home to Rideau Veteran's Home until the 1990s when it was demolished. This was the only part of Riverview which existed before 1950. A new subdivision was built after 2000, and the street names have war remembrance themed names like, "Great Oak", "Valour Drive", and "Remembrance Cress". The total population of this area is 1,203. This area is also under the jurisdiction of the Faircrest Heights Community Association.

Ottawa Life Sciences Technology Park
This area was first built up in the 1990s and is located off Smyth Road. The first building was built in the 1990s, but has since expanded. Alta Vista Manor, a retirement home, was built in the early 2000s. The University of Ottawa maintains a small campus here. South of the Park is Franco-Cité, a French language high school.

Elmvale Acres (North)
This area in the southeast of Riverview can also be considered part of Elmvale Acres which is a neighbourhood to the south. It is separated from the rest of Riverview by power lines, and from Elmvale Acres by Smyth Road. Built in the 1950s, it is home to Vincent Massey Public School, Hutton Park and two churches. Across from Russell Road on the east is Dempsey Community Centre, and some apartment buildings.

Russell Heights
"Russell Heights" has significant Arabic (28,185), Chinese (12,735), Spanish (10,850) and Italian (9,440) speaking populations. This part of Riverview is located on the east side of Russell Road. Located north of this subdivision is the run-down St-Laurent-Russell Shopping Centre. St. Laurent Boulevard on the east is home to many commercial establishments and is within view of the National Museum of Science and Technology. Further north along Russell Road and Industrial Avenue is home to many industrial establishments. The total population of this area is 1,083 (2011 census).

== Demographics ==
The RPCA boundaries for Riverview correspond to Census Tracts 5050011.03 and 5050011.04 plus Dissemination areas 35061293, 35061292, 35060961, 35061291 and 35060957. The 2011 Census for these areas shows that the Riverview neighbourhood is a very diverse neighbourhood, due to its mixed housing. 58% of inhabited dwellings are high rise apartments (5 storeys or more). 20% of dwellings are single detached homes, 15% are row houses, while 4% are small apartments. 49% of Riverview residents have English as their sole mother tongue, 16% French, 7% Arabic, 4% varieties of Chinese (including Mandarin, Cantonese, Hakka, Taiwanese, Chaochow, Fukien and Shanghainese, Chinese n.o.s as defined by Statistics Canada), 1% Somali, 1% Persian and 1% are Spanish. 52.5% of residents are female, and the other 47.5% are male. 14.6% of residents were under 18, 38.3% were 18-39, 26.3% were 40-64 and 20.8% were over 65.

== Politics ==
Riverview is situated in the riding of Ottawa South, both provincially and federally. Most of Riverview is within Alta Vista Ward, with small portions extending into Capital Ward.

== See also ==
- List of Ottawa neighbourhoods
