= Alta Vista, Ottawa =

Alta Vista
- Neighbourhood
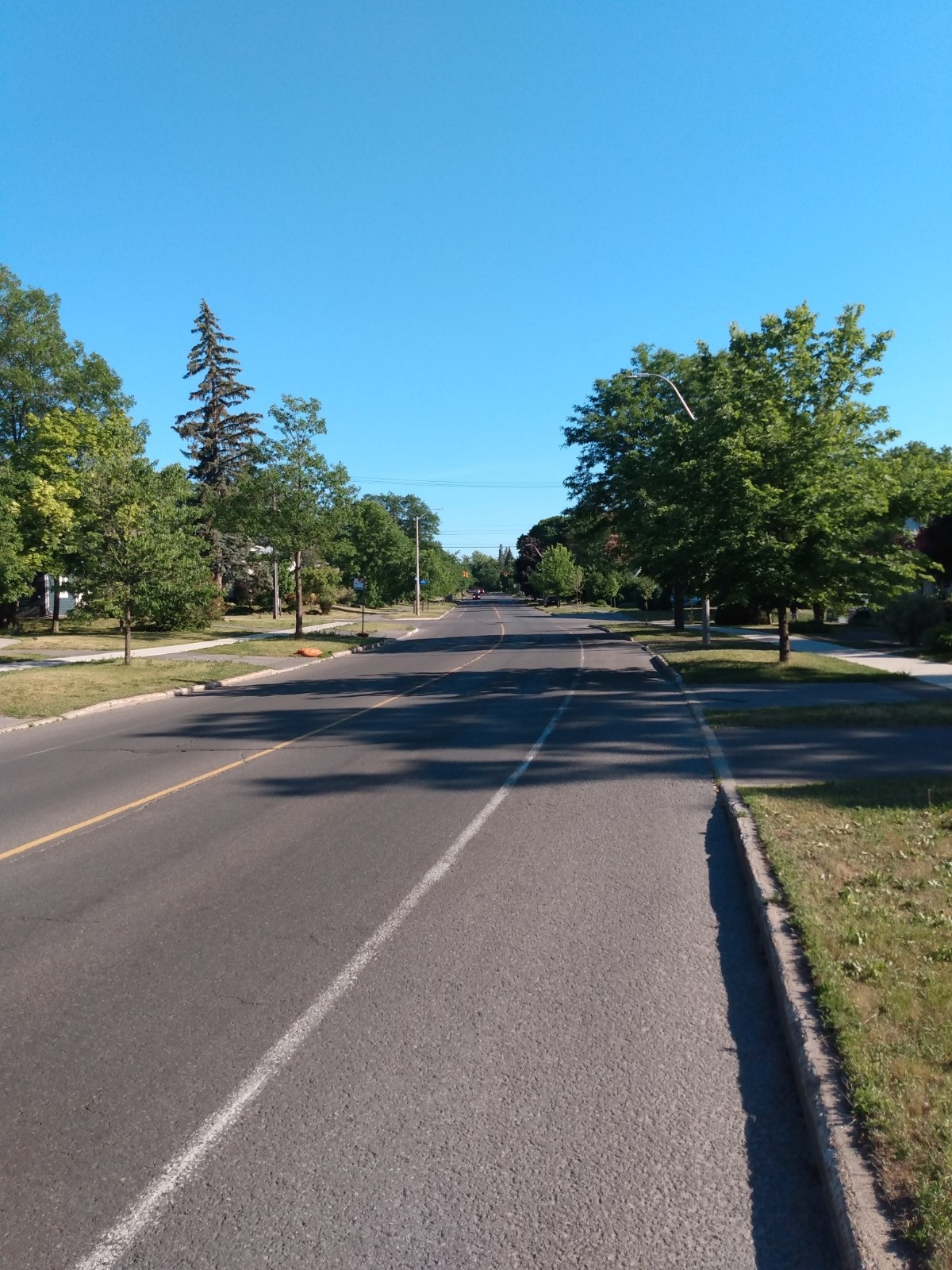
- Alta Vista Drive

- Location within Ottawa
- Coordinates: 45°23′20″N 75°39′00″W
- Country: Canada
- Province: Ontario
- City: Ottawa

Government
  - MPs: David McGuinty
  - MPPs: John Fraser
  - Councillors: Marty Carr
  - Governing body: Alta Vista Community Association
  - Chair: Stephanie Glover

Area
  - Total: 7.231 km^{2} (2.792 sq mi)
- Elevation: 90 m (300 ft)

Population (2021)
  - Total: 24,726
  - Density: 3,419/km^{2} (8,856/sq mi)
- Canada 2021 Census
- Time zone: UTC-5 (Eastern (EST))
- Forward sortation areas: K1H, K1V

Alta Vista is a neighbourhood in Alta Vista Ward in Ottawa, Ontario, Canada. Its boundaries according to the Alta Vista Community Association are that part of Alta Vista Ward south of Smyth Road in the north, north of Walkley Road and east of the Rideau River (and Bank Street), and west of the "greenspace underneath Haig Drive". However, the name is ambiguous, as there are several sub-neighbourhoods in this area, (see list below), as the neighbourhood could refer to the ward as a whole, down to the core Alta Vista area, (which could be defined as south of Pleasant Park Road, north of Heron Road, and west of the eastern greenspace corridor), centred on Alta Vista Drive.

Alta Vista Drive is a major street running through the neighbourhood, and shares its name. Both are named for their relative height, as the neighbourhood is generally higher than most of the city. Alta Vista is a highly residential neighbourhood with a strong community, several schools, religious buildings of many faiths, and community centres. It also has a vast amount of greenspace and parks, much of which is part of the Alta Vista Transportation Corridor Environmental Assessment Ottawa East Community Association.

The OC Transpo Transitway also runs through Alta Vista, with two stations in the neighbourhood itself (Pleasant Park and Riverside) as well as two just outside (Billings Bridge and Smyth), serving as a vital transit link to the rest of the city.

The General Campus of the Ottawa Hospital, and The Children's Hospital of Eastern Ontario are located just on the north side of Smyth Road, in Riverview, while the Riverside Campus of the Ottawa Hospital is located at Smyth and Riverside Drive. There are two shopping malls in and around Alta Vista: the Billings Bridge Plaza Shopping Centre at Bank Street and Riverside and the Elmvale Shopping Centre at St. Laurent and Smyth.

Alta Vista had a population of about 24,726 as of the Canada 2021 Census (Community Association borders).

== History ==
The first subdivision in the area was built in 1892 and was known as Rideau Park. The area was part of the Billings Estate and was for market gardeners. Much of what is now Alta Vista was owned by the Billings Family and was part of their estate. An earlier subdivision known as Gateville was established in 1874 but disappeared in the 1920s.

The Alta Vista name dates back to at least 1939 as a separate subdivision from Rideau Park. At the time, the area was part of Gloucester Township, but was annexed by Ottawa in 1950. Alta Vista began to be suburbanized in the 1950s, with Rideau Park expanding, and the new subdivisions of Faircrest Heights, Applewood Acres being built in the north, Ridgemont in the south and Elmvale Acres in the east. In the 1960s, the subdivision of Urbandale Acres was built between Elmvale Acres and the rest of Alta Vista.

== Sub neighbourhoods ==
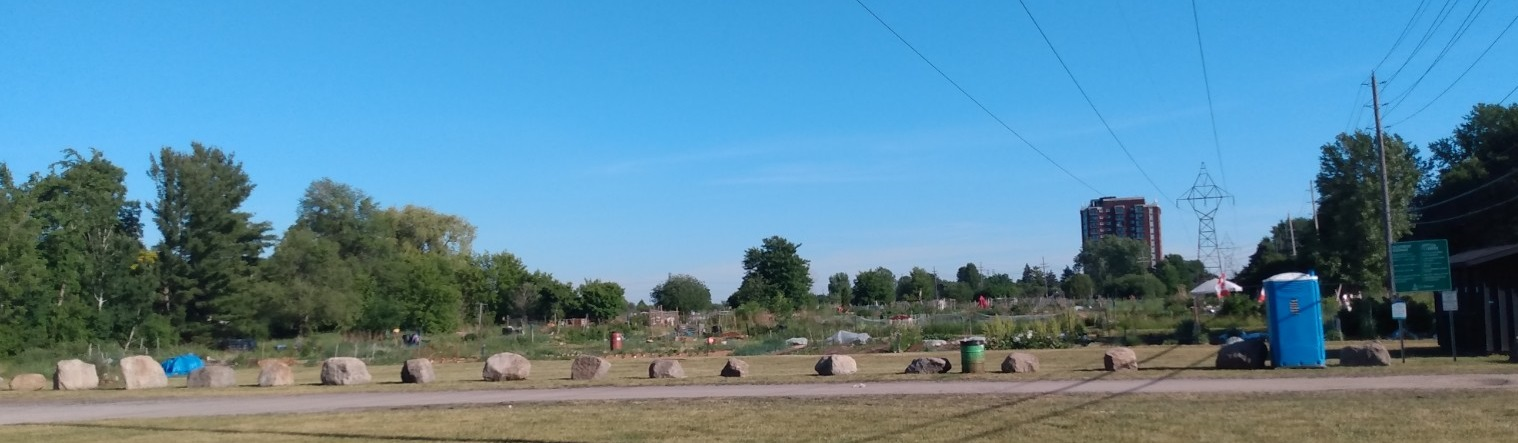
The Kilborn Allotment Gardens in the eastern part of the neighbourhood

The Alta Vista area encompasses many smaller neighbourhoods:

- Applewood Acres
- Billings
- Canterbury
- Faircrest
- Guildwood Estates
- Heron Gate
- Playfair Park
- Rideau Park
- Ridgemont
- Urbandale Acres

== Demographics ==
Using the community association border, Alta Vista corresponds to Census Tracts 5050005.00, 5050006.00, 5050007.03, 5050007.01, 5050007.02, and 5050009.00 which have has a combined population of 20,615 (2016 census). Census Tract 5050007.02 corresponds to Heron Gate which had a population of 4,660 Census Tract 5050007.01 corresponds to Playfair Park which had a population of 2,463 Census Tract 5050007.03 corresponds to the Featherston Drive area (Guildwood Estates and Urbandale Acres) and had a population of 3,723 Census Tracts 5050006.00 and 5050005.00 make up the remaining core of Alta Vista, west of the greenspace running from Smyth Road to Walkley Road. These two census tracts had a combined population of 10,567.

== Schools ==
There are several schools in the area, including:

Public elementary schools

- Alta Vista Public School
- Arch Street Public School
- Featherston Drive Public School
- Pleasant Park Public School

Public secondary schools

- Ridgemont High School
- Canterbury High School

Catholic schools

- St. Gemma Catholic
- Ste-Geneviève Catholic School
- St. Patrick's Intermediate
- St. Patrick's High School

== See also ==
- List of Ottawa neighbourhoods
- Geography of Ottawa
