= Lycée Claudel station =

Station on Ottawa's Transitway

Lycée Claudel
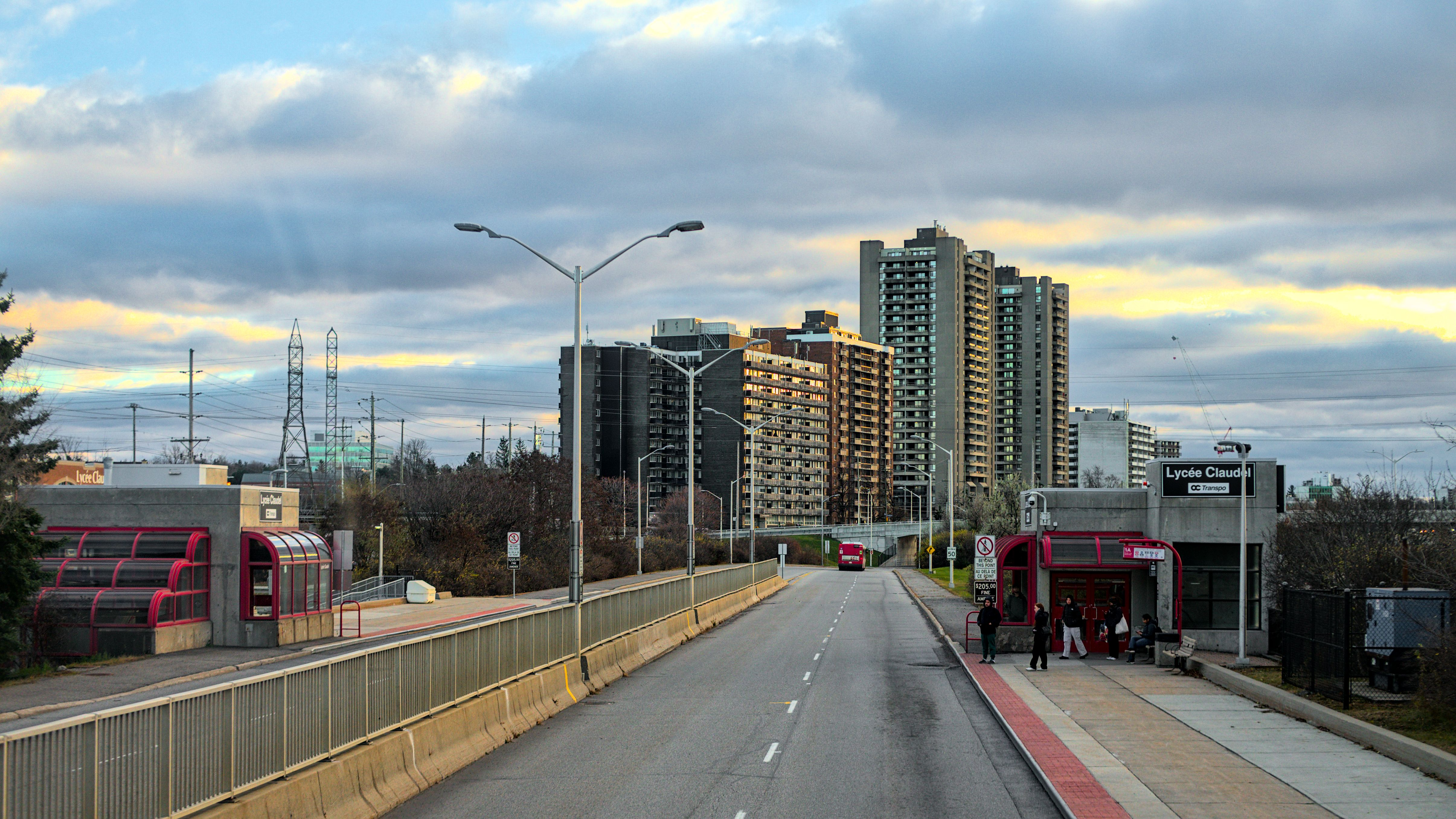

General information
- Coordinates: 45°24′23.4″N 75°39′51.6″W
- Owner: OC Transpo
- Platforms: 2

Construction
- Platform levels: 2
- Parking: No
- Cycle facilities: No

History
- Opened: 1991
- Former names: Abbey

Services
Preceding station	OC Transpo	Following station
Hospital Terminus	Route 45	Hurdman Terminus
Smyth toward Hawthorne	Route 98	Hurdman Terminus
Smyth toward Airport	Route 105	Hurdman toward St-Laurent
Former services
Preceding station	OC Transpo	Following station
Smyth toward Airport	Route 97 Closed April 2025	Hurdman Terminus
Smyth toward Barrhaven Centre	Route 99 Truncated April 2025	Hurdman Terminus
Location

Lycée Claudel station (formerly Abbey station) is a bus rapid transit station on Ottawa's Transitway served by OC Transpo buses. It is located on Ottawa's Southeast Transitway, and is one stop south of the main hub of Hurdman. The station is named for the adjacent French private school Lycée Claudel d'Ottawa.

The station's former name Abbey refers to nearby Abbey Road, a short local road which is located further behind the school and the CN railway (which runs parallel to the Transitway). The Lycée Claudel stop is located between Riverside Drive and Old Riverside Drive just south of Hincks Lane.

The area has many high-density apartment complexes, which are the main trip generators for this station along with the students of Lycée Claudel.

== Service ==
The following routes serve Lycée Claudel:

Lycée Claudel station service
Frequent routes	10 45 88 90 98 105
Local routes	49 92 110
Event routes	451
School routes	609 613 645 647

=== Notes ===
- Route 110 only serves this stop during the early morning before the opening of the Trillium Line at 6:00 AM.
