= Pleasant Park station =

Bus stop in Ottawa, Canada

Pleasant Park
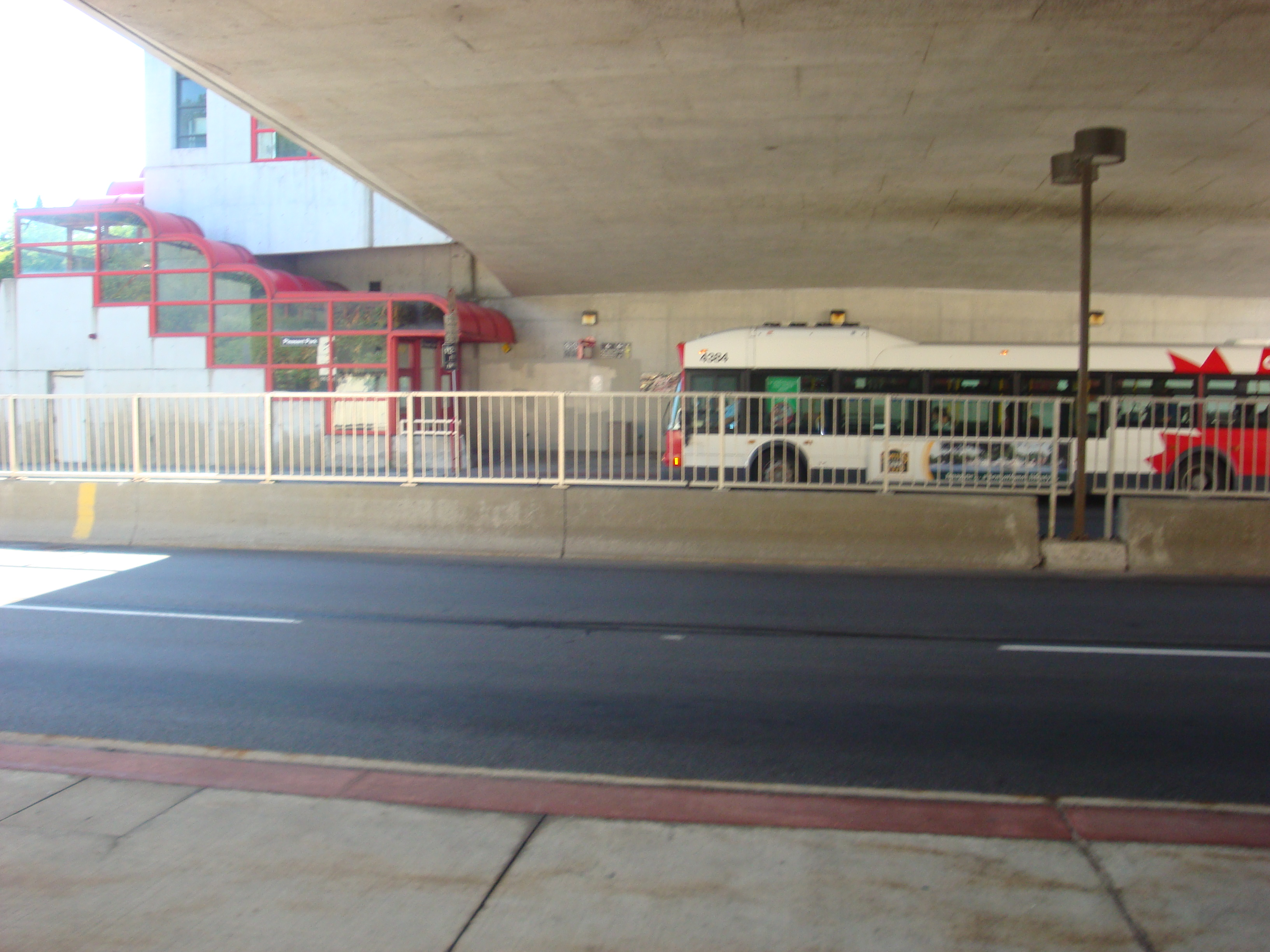
- Pleasant Park Station looking east.

General information
- Coordinates: 45°23′33.9″N 75°40′9.7″W
- Owner: OC Transpo
- Platforms: 4

Construction
- Platform levels: 2
- Parking: None

History
- Opened: 2 November 1996

Services
| Preceding station | OC Transpo | Following station |
|---|---|---|
| Billings Bridge toward Hawthorne | Route 98 | Riverside toward Hurdman |
| Billings Bridge toward Airport | Route 105 | Riverside toward St-Laurent |
Location

Pleasant Park station is a bus stop on Ottawa's Transitway served by OC Transpo buses. It is located in the southeastern transitway section at Pleasant Park Road (a collector road through Alta Vista) near Riverside Drive. The station is mostly used by people who take the 49 bus to or from Alta Vista, or by local residents in the nearby residential areas.

The station has two levels: one connecting to Pleasant Park Road, the other to the transitway. Unusual for stations along the Southeast Transitway, there is no bridge or tunnel connecting the two sides. Pedestrians must cross the overpass after exiting at the upper level.

It is one of the more lightly used stations due to the lack of any other trip generators or transfer connections.

== Service ==
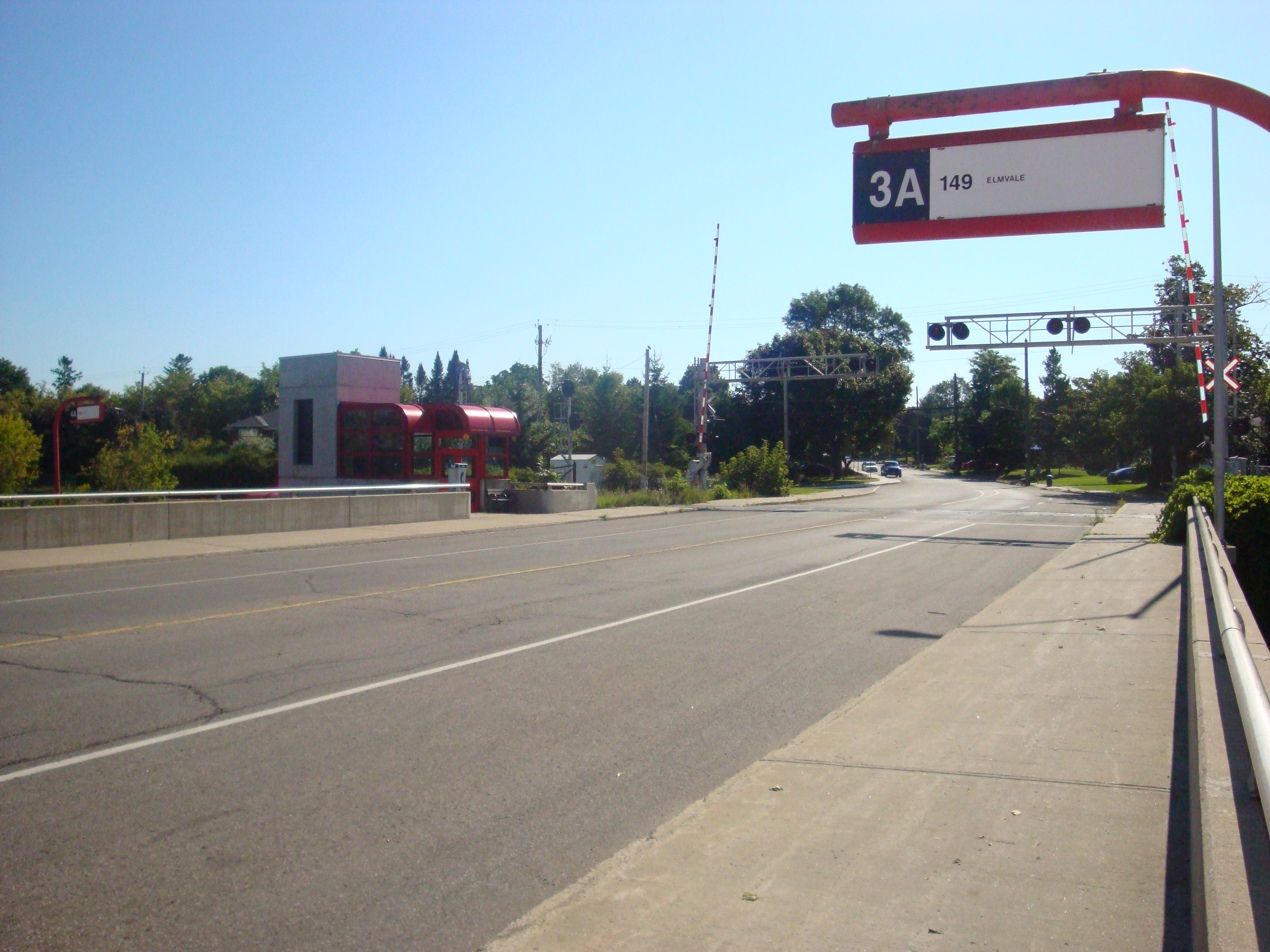
The upper level of Pleasant Park Station. It is served by route 49.

The following routes serve Pleasant Park:

Pleasant Park station service
| Frequent routes | 10 88 90 98 105 |
| Local routes | 49 92 110 |
| Event routes | 451 |
| School routes | 647 |

=== Notes ===
- Route 49 is the only route that serves the upper level of this station.
- Route 110 only serves this station before the Trillium Line opens at 6:00 AM.
