= Riverside station (Ottawa) =

Bus station in Ottawa, Canada

Riverside
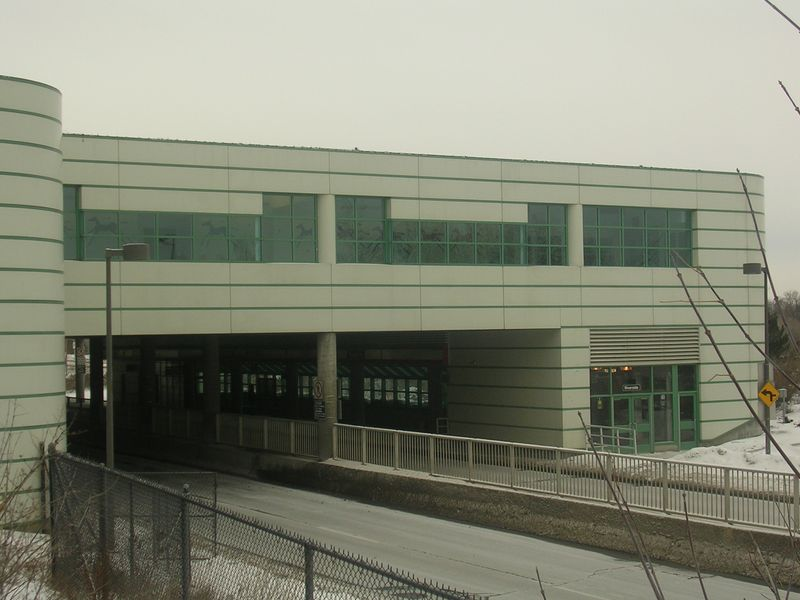

General information
- Coordinates: 45°23′47.5″N 75°40′10″W
- Owner: OC Transpo
- Platforms: 2

Construction
- Platform levels: 2
- Parking: No
- Cycle facilities: No

History
- Opened: 1991

Services
Preceding station	OC Transpo	Following station
Pleasant Park toward Hawthorne	Route 98	Smyth toward Hurdman
Pleasant Park toward Airport	Route 105	Smyth toward St-Laurent
Former services
Preceding station	OC Transpo	Following station
Pleasant Park toward Airport	Route 97 Closed April 2025	Smyth toward Hurdman
Pleasant Park toward Barrhaven Centre	Route 99 Truncated April 2025	Smyth toward Hurdman
Location

Riverside station is an OC Transpo bus station on Ottawa's Transitway that is connected to the Riverside Campus of The Ottawa Hospital near the intersection of Smyth Road and Riverside Drive. Stairs and elevators from the platform level lead directly to the interior of the hospital, making bus travel easy for medical appointments even in bad weather.

The hospital is the primary trip generator and main purpose for this station. There are no connecting bus routes here.

The station was built when the hospital underwent a major expansion of its facility. It agreed to let the transitway pass in its terrain and open a new station as there were initially no stations to be built at that location. The 4,200 square feet new administration wing and Transit station was completed in 1991.

== Service ==
The following routes serve Riverside:

Riverside station service
Frequent routes	10 88 90 98 105
Local routes	49 92 110
Event routes	451
School routes	613 647

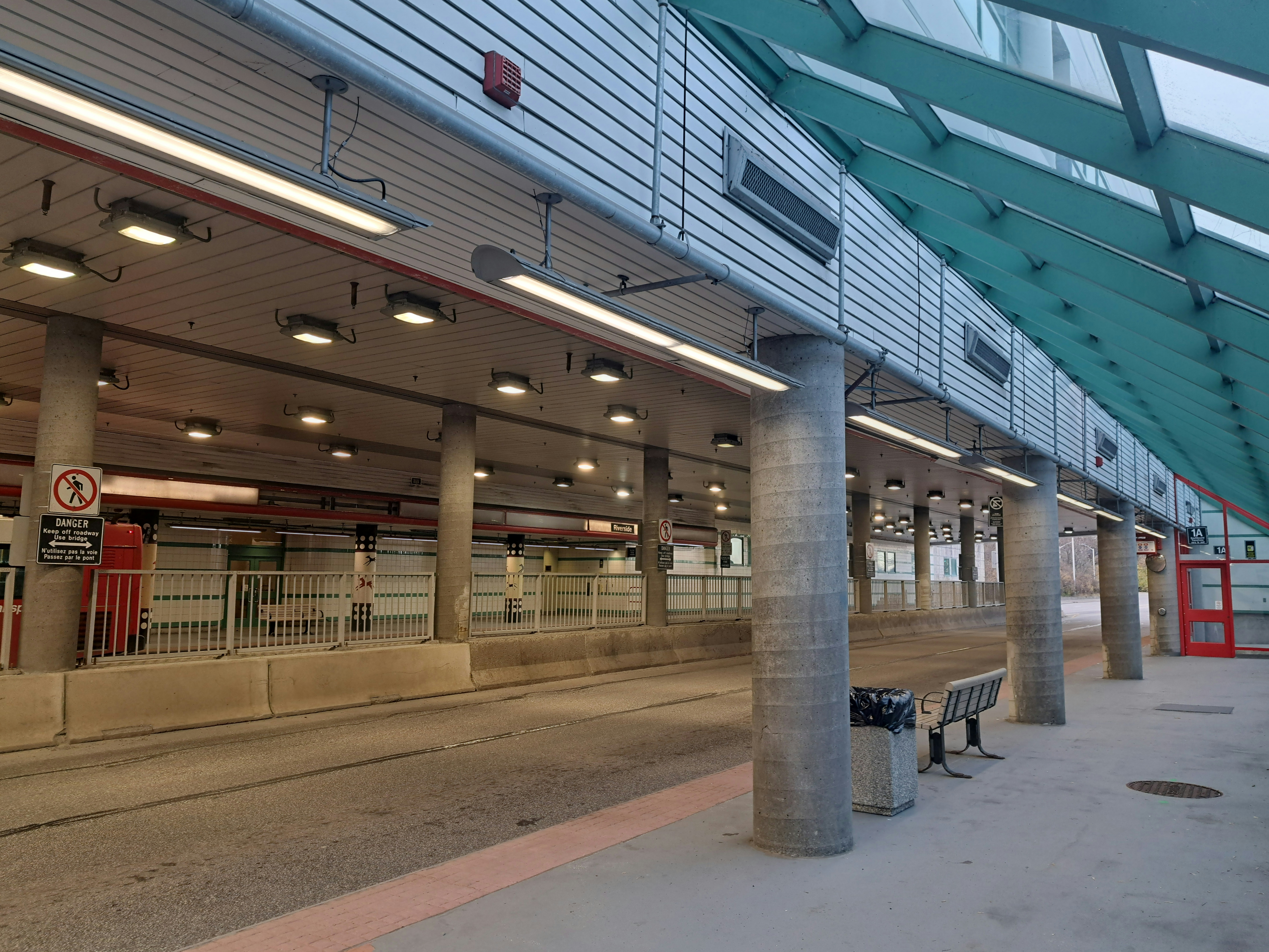
Platform 1A, looking southward

=== Notes ===
- Route 5 travels along Smyth Road, just north of the station.
- Route 110 only serves this station before the opening of the Trillium Line at 6:00 AM.
