= Elmvale Acres Shopping Centre =

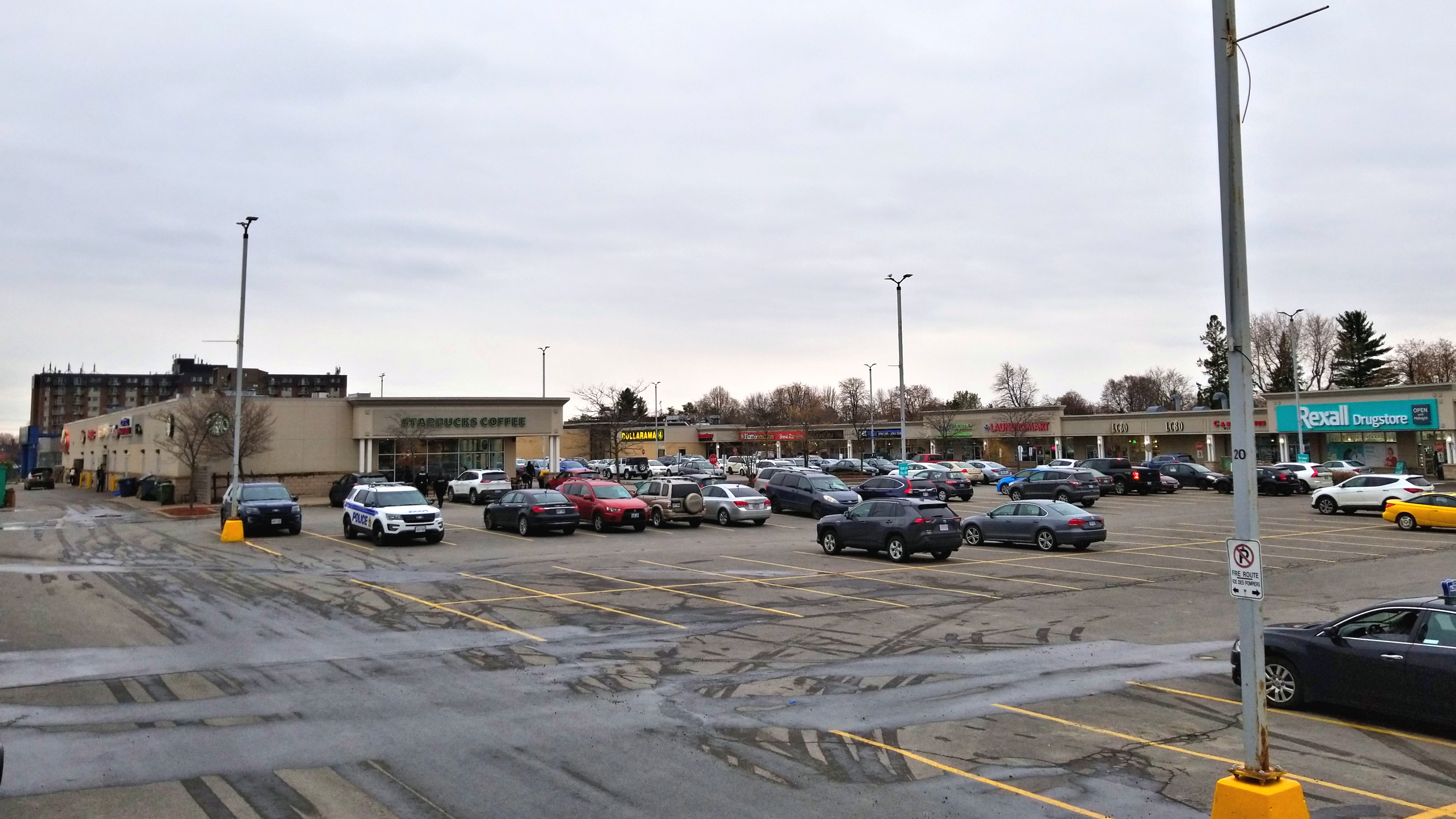
- Location: Ottawa, Ontario, Canada
- Coordinates: 45.3992°N 75.6241°W
- Address: 1910 St. Laurent Blvd.
- Opened: 1961
- Owner: RioCan
- Num. of stores: 40
- Num. of anchor tenants: 1
- Floor area: 146,699 ft^{2} (13,628.8 m^{2})
- Public transit: Elmvale

Elmvale Acres Shopping Centre is a strip mall located in the Elmvale Acres neighbourhood of Ottawa, Ontario, Canada. It opened as an enclosed mall in 1961 and was one of the earliest fully enclosed shopping malls in the city.

The mall is bounded by Smyth Road to the north, Othello Avenue to the west, Russell Road to the east, and St. Laurent Boulevard to the south. The shopping centre has 40 shops and services including Dollarama, LCBO, Rexall, Starbucks and the Ottawa Public Library. Its gross leasable area is 146,699 square feet (13,628.8 m^{2}). The shopping centre is currently owned by RioCan Real Estate Investment Trust. The shopping centre is adjacent to the Elmvale Station providing bus service via OC Transpo routes 5, 40, 41, 48 and 49.

The enclosed portion of the mall was demolished in 2005 and replaced by two ranges facing each other across the parking lot. Proprietor RioCan began further redevelopment in 2017, projecting a mix of new commercial and residential buildings with 570 new residential units and a 3,150 square metres (33,900 sq ft) park. Plans include three 16-storey towers along St. Laurent Boulevard, which would be the tallest buildings along this street, as well as a 9-storey building along Smyth Road. Construction began in 2019 and will be implemented over 10 to 15 years.

On January 31, 2019, a 30 year old man was shot and killed by an OPS officer during an altercation. Dispatch audio indicates the man was seen walking into the mall holding a knife in his hand. Sources told CBC News that the officer was cut on his forehead. The Special Investigations Unit investigated the shooting and concluded that the police officers used reasonably necessary force.
