= Elmvale Acres =

- Neighbourhood
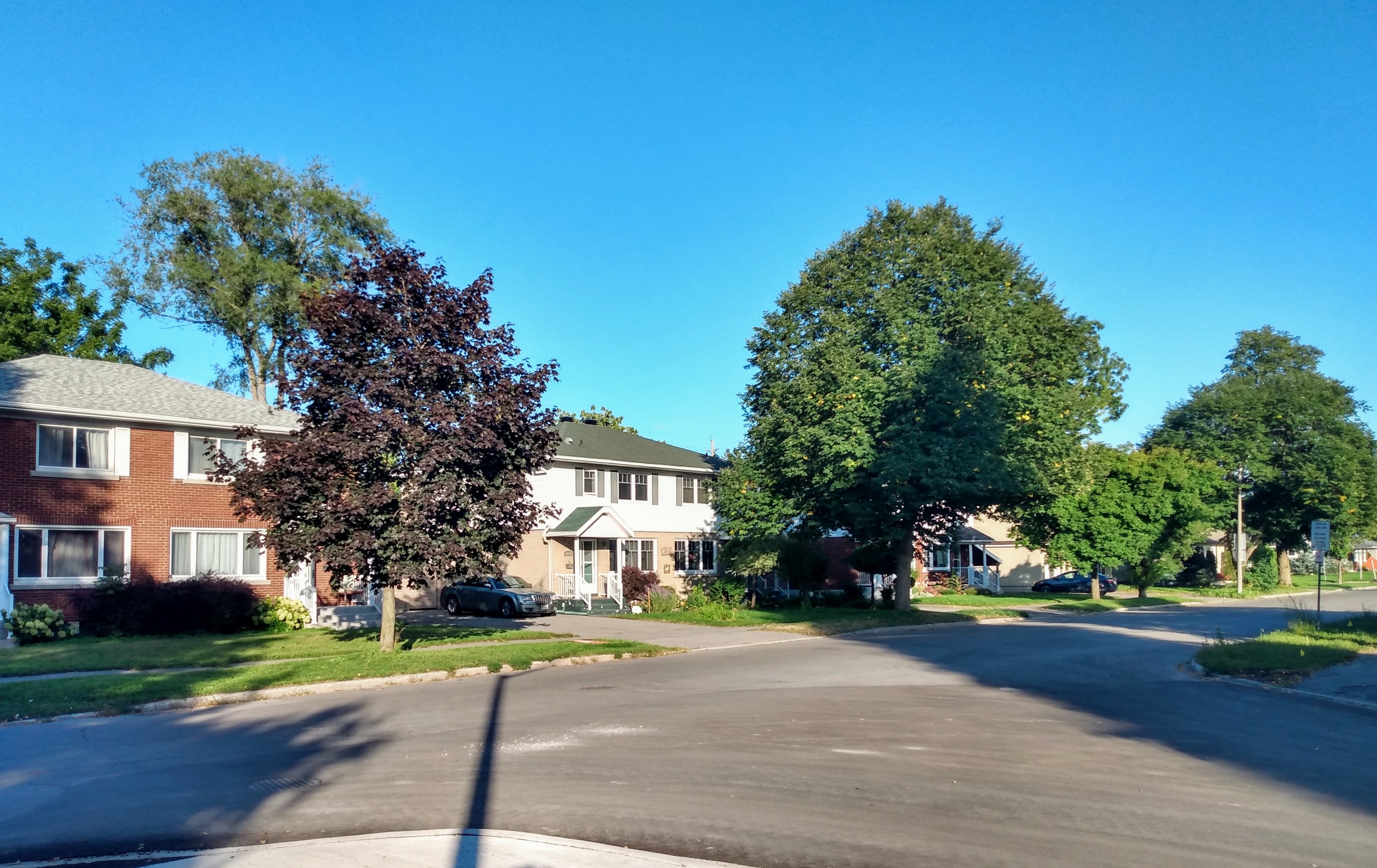
- Houses on Saunderson Drive

- Location within Ottawa
- Coordinates: 45°23′50″N 75°38′00″W
- Country: Canada
- Province: Ontario
- City: Ottawa
- Construction: 1955

Government
  - MPs: David McGuinty
  - MPPs: John Fraser
  - Councillors: Marty Carr
  - Governing body: Elmvale Acres Community Association
  - President: Tomas Szeredi

Area
  - Total: 0.919 km^{2} (0.355 sq mi)
- Elevation: 75 m (246 ft)

Population (2016)
  - Total: 2,627
  - Density: 2,859/km^{2} (7,400/sq mi)
- Canada 2016 Census
- Time zone: UTC-5 (Eastern (EST))
- Forward sortation area: K1G

Elmvale Acres is a neighbourhood in south Ottawa, Ontario, Canada, located in Alta Vista Ward. It was built in the late 1950s by the contractor and property developer, Robert Campeau, with construction beginning in 1955. It is bounded on the north by Smyth Road, on the east by Othello Avenue behind Elmvale Acres Shopping Centre, on the south by Pleasant Park Road and on the west by the Hydro Corridor. According to the 2016 Census, the population for this area was 2,627.

The neighbourhood is represented by the Elmvale Acres Community Association, which was known as the Elmvale Acres Property Owners Association prior to 1959, and was known as the Elmvale-Urbandale Community Association when it covered neighbouring Urbandale in the 1960s and 1970s.

East of the neighbourhood is the Elmvale Acres Shopping Centre on St. Laurent, which functions as an east end OC Transpo transit terminus. This shopping centre was the scene of a family-related shooting in September 2006.

== Demographics ==
Most of the neighbourhood corresponds to Census Tract 5050009.00. According to the 2016 Census, the neighbourhood is 66% Anglophone and 18% Francophone. Other major languages include Arabic (4%), Tagalog (1%) and Portuguese (1%).

== See also ==
- List of Ottawa neighbourhoods
