= Smyth station =

Bus stop in Ottawa, Canada

Smyth
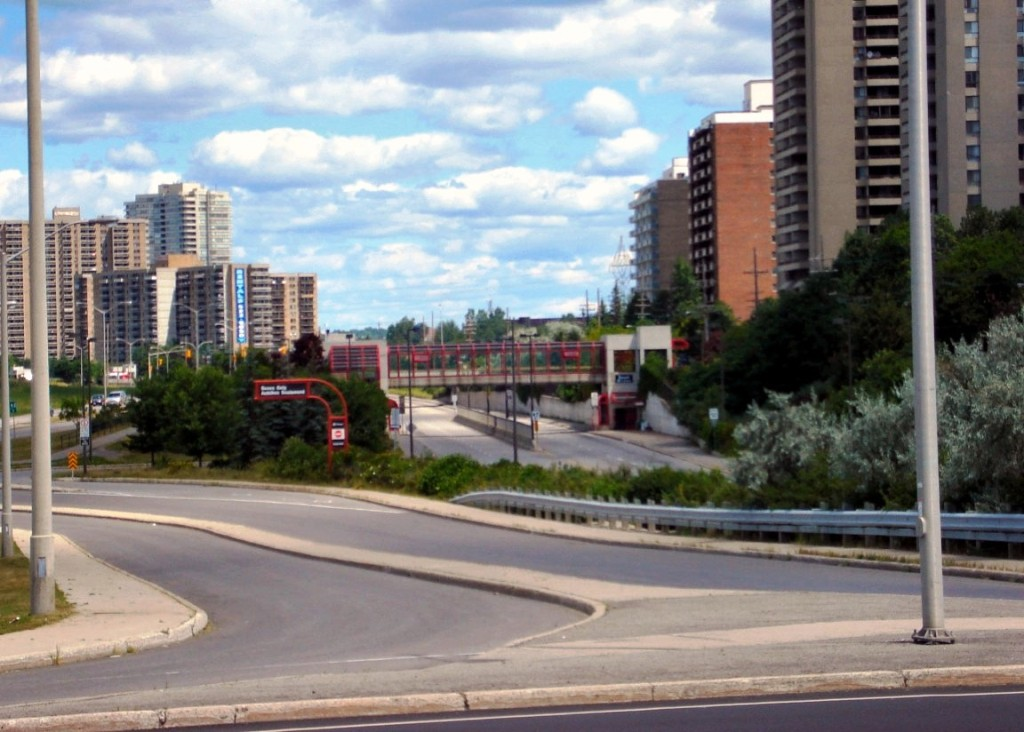

General information
- Coordinates: 45°24′4.7″N 75°39′59.6″W
- Owner: OC Transpo
- Platforms: 2

Construction
- Platform levels: 2
- Parking: No
- Cycle facilities: No

History
- Opened: 1991

Services
Preceding station	OC Transpo	Following station
Riverside toward Hawthorne	Route 98	Lycée Claudel toward Hurdman
Riverside toward Airport	Route 105	Lycée Claudel toward St-Laurent
Former services
Preceding station	OC Transpo	Following station
Riverside toward Airport	Route 97 Closed April 2025	Lycée Claudel toward Hurdman
Riverside toward Barrhaven Centre	Route 99 Truncated April 2025	Lycée Claudel toward Hurdman
Location

Smyth station (/smaɪθ/) is a bus stop on Ottawa's Transitway served by OC Transpo buses. It is located in the south-eastern transitway section on Frobisher Lane near Smyth Road.

Most of its users come from the six apartment highrises in face of it and the business area on nearby Alta Vista Drive, because of the Rideau River behind the station and a train line on the other side of the apartments.

== Service ==
The following routes serve Smyth:

Smyth station service
Frequent routes	10 88 90 98 105
Local routes	49 92 110
Event routes	451
School routes	609 613 645 647

=== Notes ===
- Route 5 is available nearby on Smyth Road, just south of the station.
- Route 110 only serves this station before the Trillium line opens at 6:00 AM

=== Features ===
- Elevator
- Taxi pick-up
- Ticket machine
- Emergency call boxes
- Payphone (Bell)
- OC Transpo Information Line
