= Guildwood Estates =

Sub neighbourhood within the Alta Vista area of Ottawa, Ontario, Canada

Coordinates: 45.384°N 75.658°W

Guildwood Estates is a sub neighbourhood within the Alta Vista area of Ottawa, Ontario, Canada. It can be broadly described as south of Kilborn Ave., west of the Walkley-Kilborn greenspace, east of Parkland and north of Heron Road. The population of this area according to the Canada 2011 Census was 3,179. However, maps usually show Guildwood Estates as the western section of this area, while the eastern half is the neighbourhood of Urbandale Acres. Guildwood Estates is newer, having mostly been built in the early 1970s, while Urbandale Acres was built in the 1960s.

In 1969, residents opposed the construction of what became the Herongate Mall. The Ontario Municipal Board sided with developers Queens Grove Development Limited and construction was allowed to proceed. After 20 years of decline, the traditional indoor shopping mall was thoroughly redeveloped by Trinity Development Group starting in 2013. Nearly all of the existing mall was torn down and new buildings built on a standalone box store model.

Included in Guildwood Estates is Featherston Drive Public School, but the area is highlighted by its middle-class housing developed mainly during the 1960s and 1970s. Recent development projects have been completed on Virginia Dr., but with limited space left for new houses there is likely to be little more construction of homes in the near future.

This neighbourhood borders Grasshopper Hill Park, City of Ottawa Greenspace, as well as Featherston Park.

== Schools ==
Featherston Drive Public School was built in 1963-64. Despite being incomplete, the school greeted its first students on 3 February 1964 in four classes and the kindergarten. The remainder of the school, including the shop and gymnasium, were completed in time for the 1964-65 school year. The school remains open to this day (2015).

In 1968-69, the Ottawa Separate School Board purchased the land and built Cardinal-Léger school on Virginia Drive. The French Separate primary school was one of ten Separate schools closed by the Board in 1984 due to low attendance. Approximately 170 students were transferred to Ste. Geneviève school, also in Alta Vista. The school property was used by the French-language board for several years to operate a variety of programs before being sold to developers. The building was then torn down to make way for the town houses around Manorhill Private road.
