= Riverside Drive (Ottawa) =

Major road in Ottawa, Ontario, Canada

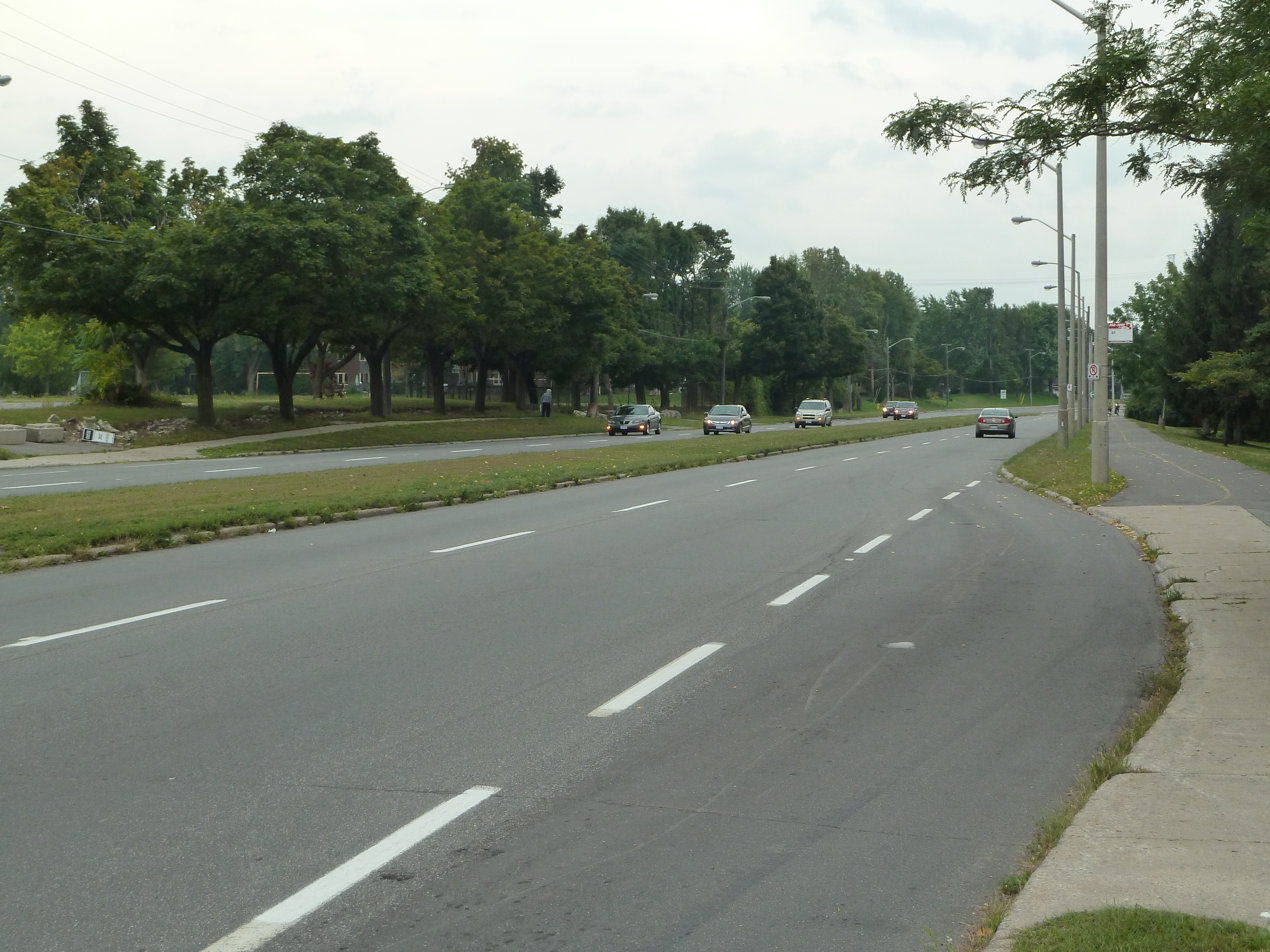
Riverside Drive looking south from Mooney's Bay

Riverside Drive (Ottawa Road #19) is a major road in Ottawa, Ontario, Canada, that follows along the eastern bank of the Rideau River. Its northern terminus is at the Transitway/Via Rail underpass just south of the Queensway, and the road proceeds south to Limebank Road where it continues as River Road until the city limits. North of the Queensway, Riverside continues as Vanier Parkway, which travels through Vanier until Beechwood Avenue. The Vanier Parkway name is linked to the neighbourhood of Vanier, which was named for former Governor General of Canada Georges Vanier.

Most of the road is a four-lane divided principal arterial, with a speed limit of 60 km/h (37 mph), although the general flow is faster in many sections.

Riverside is home to the Riverside Hospital, the Billings Bridge Plaza, the RA Centre, Canada Post headquarters, Public Works Canada headquarters, Canadian Labour Congress headquarters, Vincent Massey Park, Terry Fox Athletic Facility, and Mooney's Bay Park.

Riverside originally began at Montreal Road, but the area between Montreal Road and Hurdman's Bridge was renamed River Road (now River Road North) in 1960. Riverside was re-aligned between Smyth Road and Industrial Avenue in 1986. Riverside once ended at Industrial, while it was Alta Vista Drive that carried traffic across the Queensway to become the Vanier Parkway. The old alignment of Riverside Drive in Riverview continued to be known as Riverside Drive, serving a number of apartment building complexes, and has a cul-de-sac at each end. It would later be bifurcated by the Hospital Link Road, and its northern section was renamed Lycée Place, and its southern section renamed Frobisher Lane.

== Limebank Road ==
Limebank Road is an arterial road in Ottawa, which is a southbound continuation of Riverside Drive that starts at River Road, and continues through Riverside South and to Mitch Owens Rd. It continues southbound through West Greely as Dozois Road. The entire road has an 80 km/h (50 mph) speed limit, excluding the Rideau Road intersection where it is 60 km/h (37 mph).

== Major intersections ==
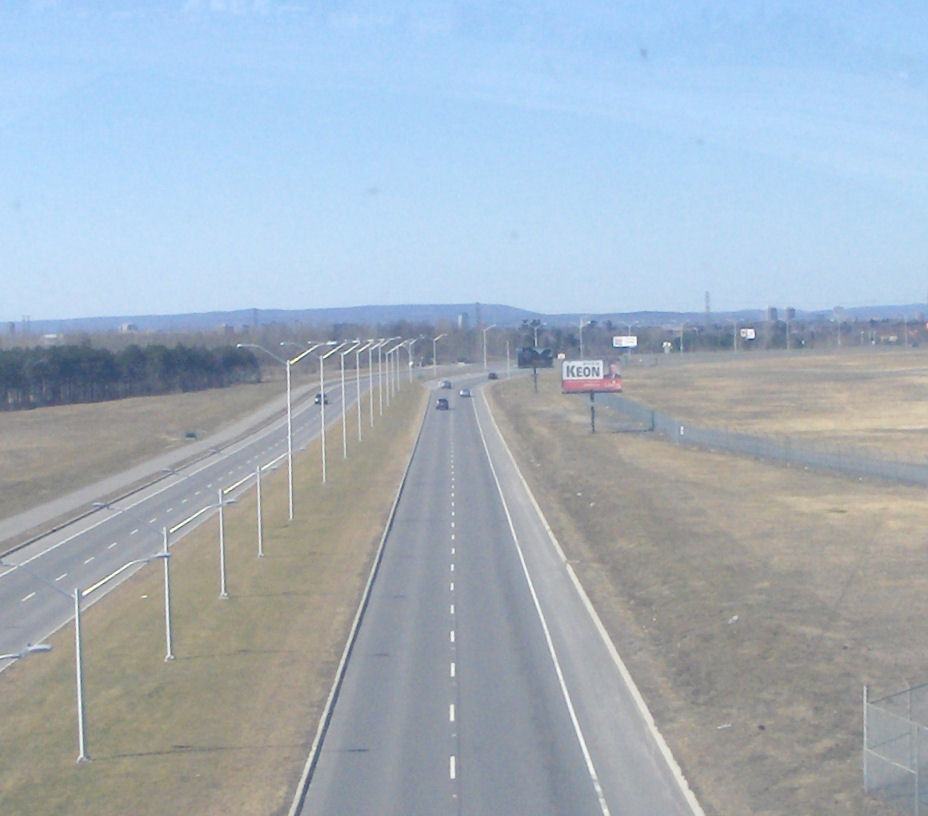
River Road, with the Macdonald Cartier Airport on the right

On Vanier Parkway

- Ottawa Road 44 (Beechwood Avenue / St. Patrick Street)
- Ottawa Road 34 (Montreal Road)

On Riverside Drive

- The Queensway / Highway 417, exit 117
- Ottawa Road 30 (Industrial Avenue) / Bus Access to Hurdman Transit Station
- Ottawa Road 72 (Smyth Road / Main Street)
- Ottawa Road 31 (Bank Street)
- Ottawa Road 79 (Bronson Avenue)
- Ottawa Road 16 (Heron Road)
- Ottawa Road 74 (Walkley Road)
- Ottawa Road 32 (Hunt Club Road)

On River Road

- Limebank Road
- Ottawa Road 14 (Leitrim Road)
- Earl Armstrong Road (and Strandherd Drive via the Vimy Memorial Bridge)
- Ottawa Road 8 (Mitch Owens Road)
- Ottawa Road 6 (Roger Stevens Drive)
- Ottawa Road 114 (Osgoode Main Street)
- Ottawa Road 4 (Dalmeny Road)

== Neighbourhoods ==
- Riverview
- Alta Vista
- Billings Bridge
- Uplands/South Keys

River Road

- Riverside South
- Manotick
- Edgewater Park

Vanier Parkway

- Vanier
- Overbrook
