= Lycée Claudel d'Ottawa =

Location
- 1635 Lycée Place; Ottawa, Ontario, K1G 0E5; Canada; 45°24′22″N 75°39′48″W

Information
- Established: 1962
- Grades: JK-12
- Enrollment: 1000
- Language: English, French, Spanish
- Campus: urban
- Colours: Red, Gold and White
- Public transit access: Lycée Claudel Station

The Lycée Claudel d'Ottawa is a French-language private school in Ottawa built in the early 1960s. It was renovated by Edward J. Cuhaci to provide an infill between two existing school buildings, comprising classrooms and a 600-seat auditorium. It is located on Lycée Place (formerly Old Riverside Drive). The school has approximately 1000 students in grades JK-12. Named after the French poet Paul Claudel, the school follows the French international curriculum. All classes, with the exception of language classes, are taught in French, and students complete the French baccalaureat at the end of grade 12 (called "Terminale").

== Alumni ==
As the school is located in Canada's national capital, some Canadian politicians' children are among its alumni, including those of former Canadian prime ministers Pierre Trudeau (including Justin Trudeau) and Brian Mulroney, and Quebec Premier Rene Levesque. Hockey player Alex Kovalev's children also attended the school.

== See also ==
- Agence pour l'enseignement français à l'étranger
