= Alta Vista Drive =

Suburban road in Ottawa, Ontario, Canada

- Map of Alta Vista Drive
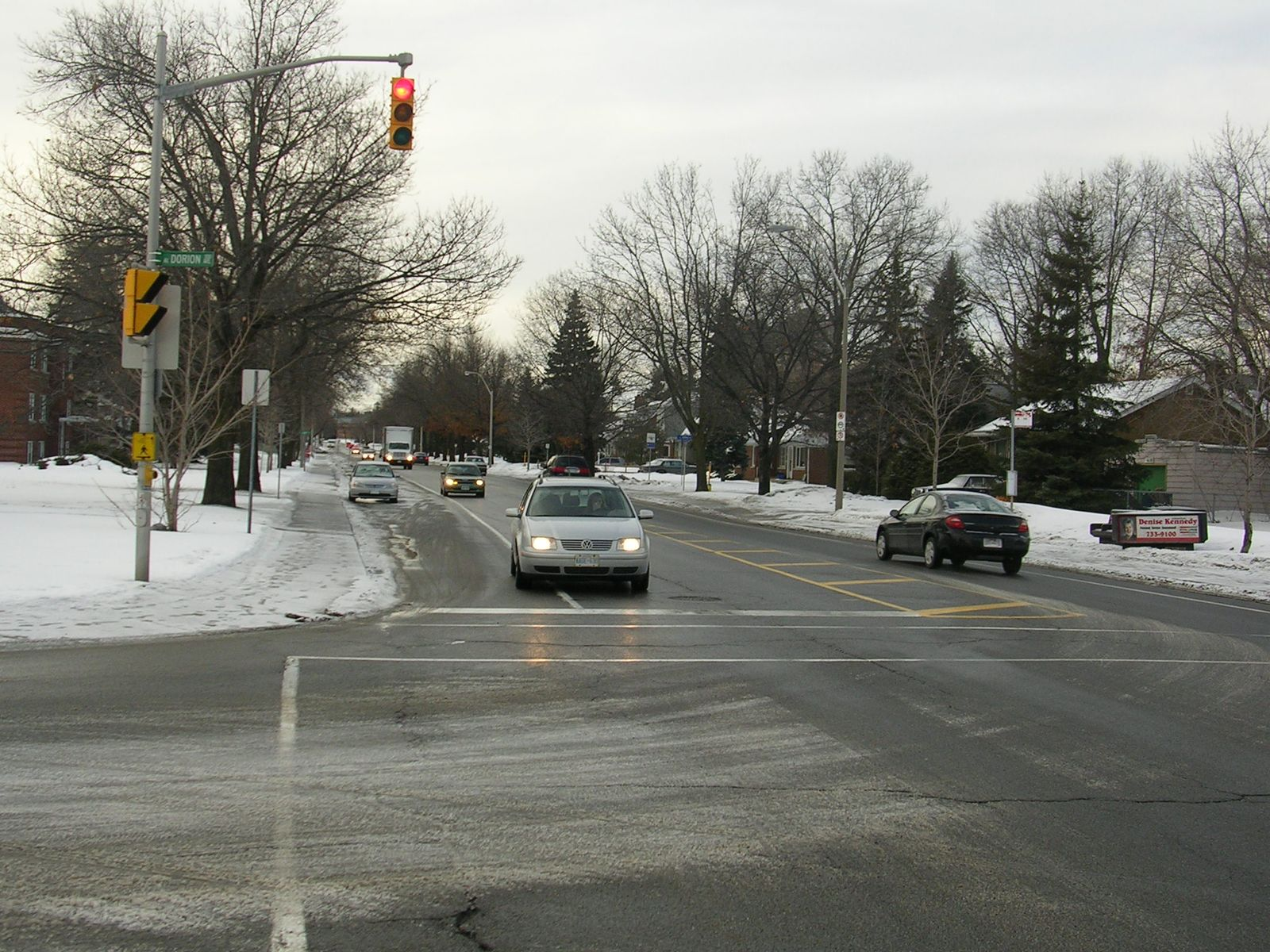
- Alta Vista Drive looking south in Riverview

Route information
- Maintained by City of Ottawa
- Length: 5 km (3.1 mi)

Major junctions
- South end: Bank Street
- North end: Industrial Avenue

Location
- Country: Canada
- Province: Ontario
- Major cities: Ottawa

Highway system
- Roads in Ontario

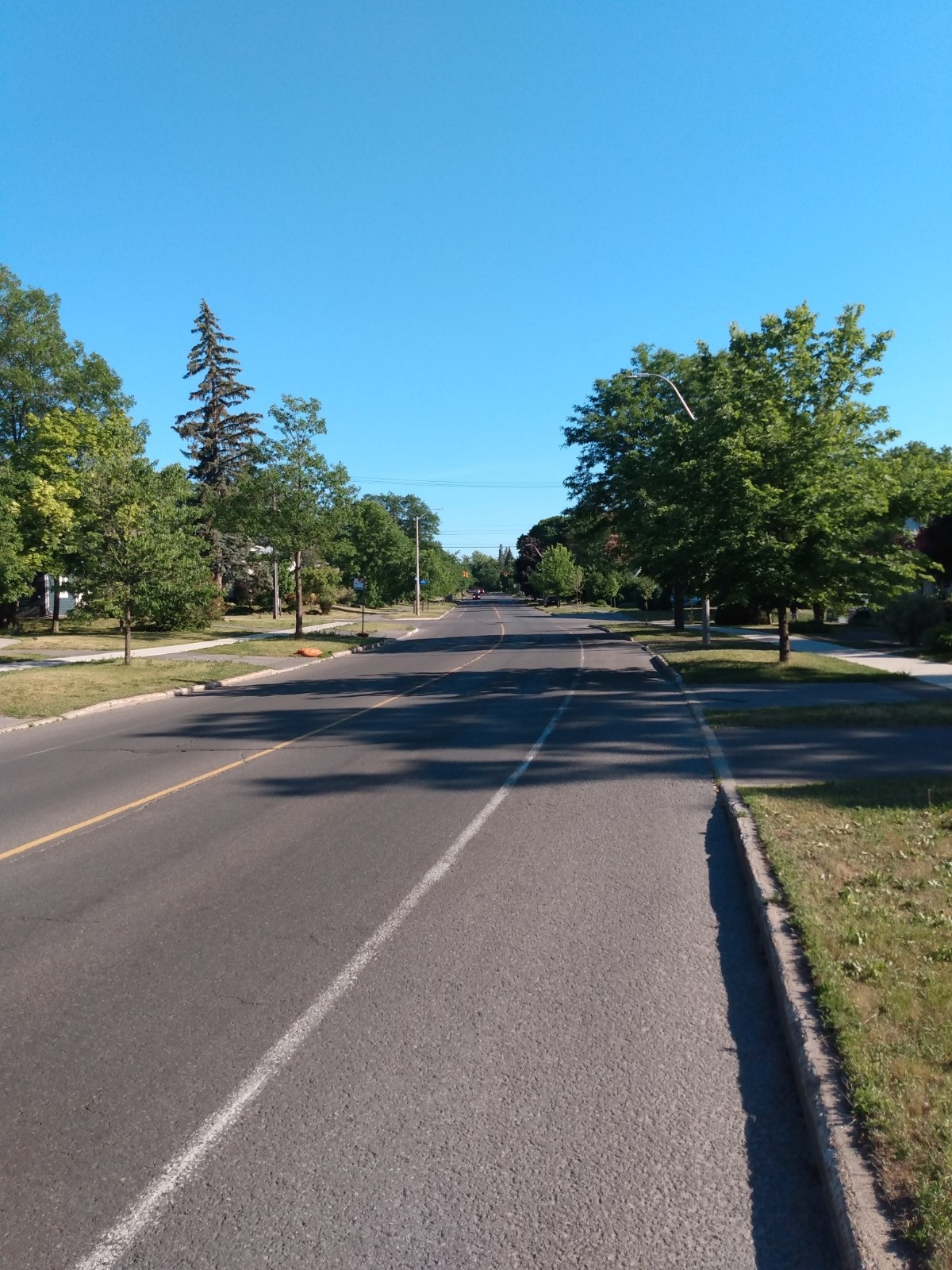
Alta Vista Drive in Alta Vista

Alta Vista Drive is a suburban road in Ottawa, Ontario, Canada, and is the main north-south street in the city's Alta Vista Ward. It runs from Bank Street in the south to Industrial Avenue in the north covering the neighbourhoods of Ridgemont, Alta Vista and Riverview.

Alta Vista was created as the result of major residential developments (notably the Rideau Park and Alta Vista subdivisions) in the region following World War II. First referred to as the "100 foot highway", it was named Churchill Avenue (after Winston Churchill) in 1941. After Ottawa annexed Gloucester Township in July 1950, the road was renamed "Alta Vista Drive", as there was already a Churchill Avenue in Ottawa. The first stretch was built between Smyth Road and Kilborn Avenue in 1939. Gloucester Township Council passed a by-law on May 3, 1937, permitting its construction. The stretch from Kilborn to Randall was built in 1940; the stretch north of Smyth in 1942 (to what is now Terminal Avenue) and south of Randall to Bank Street (then called "Metcalfe Road") in 1947.

Alta Vista originally ran past Industrial and connected with the Vanier Parkway, but the intersection, which also involved Riverside Drive was re-aligned in 1986. Furthermore, in the 1990s, Alta Vista gained bicycle lanes along its entire stretch. Alta Vista is so named for its general height, as the neighbourhoods it runs through are generally higher than the rest of the city (the name means "a view from above" or "high view" in Spanish and Portuguese). The name was first applied to the area in 1913, for a small subdivision built on the north side of Randall Avenue which had a good view of Parliament Hill.

For the most part, Alta Vista runs through residential areas, and it is a two to four-lane minor arterial road, with a speed limit of 50 km/h (31 mph). The area consists mostly of single-home houses, with the exception of three apartment-style, low-rent buildings named the "Alta Vista Towers" located in the north near Industrial Avenue and the Alta Vista Plaza. Alta Vista Drive consists of mixed housing, ranging from small modest houses in the northern parts, to more expensive, small Colonial-style houses and bungalows in the area immediately south to Smyth Road.

The road is characterized by large trees along both sides and the Via Rail train track running parallel between Alta Vista Drive and Riverside Drive from Industrial Avenue to Smyth Road.

Alta Vista is home to the National Defence Medical Centre, Canadian Pharmacists Association, Canadian Blood Services, Canadian Dental Association, Ontario Medical Association, the Canadian Medical Association, and its affiliate MD Management, and the Conference Board of Canada, located in the area north of the Smyth Road intersection in a stretch of the road that is not residential, as well as Ridgemont High School and St. Patrick's High School located south from Smyth Road. The area is home to the Anglican Church St. Thomas the Apostle, the United Church Rideau Park, and the Presbyterian Church St. Timothy's. There is one branch of the Ottawa Library and two shopping centres, one being at the northernmost stretch near Industrial Avenue, and the other at the southernmost section abutting Bank Street.
