= Ottawa General Hospital =

- The Ottawa Hospital
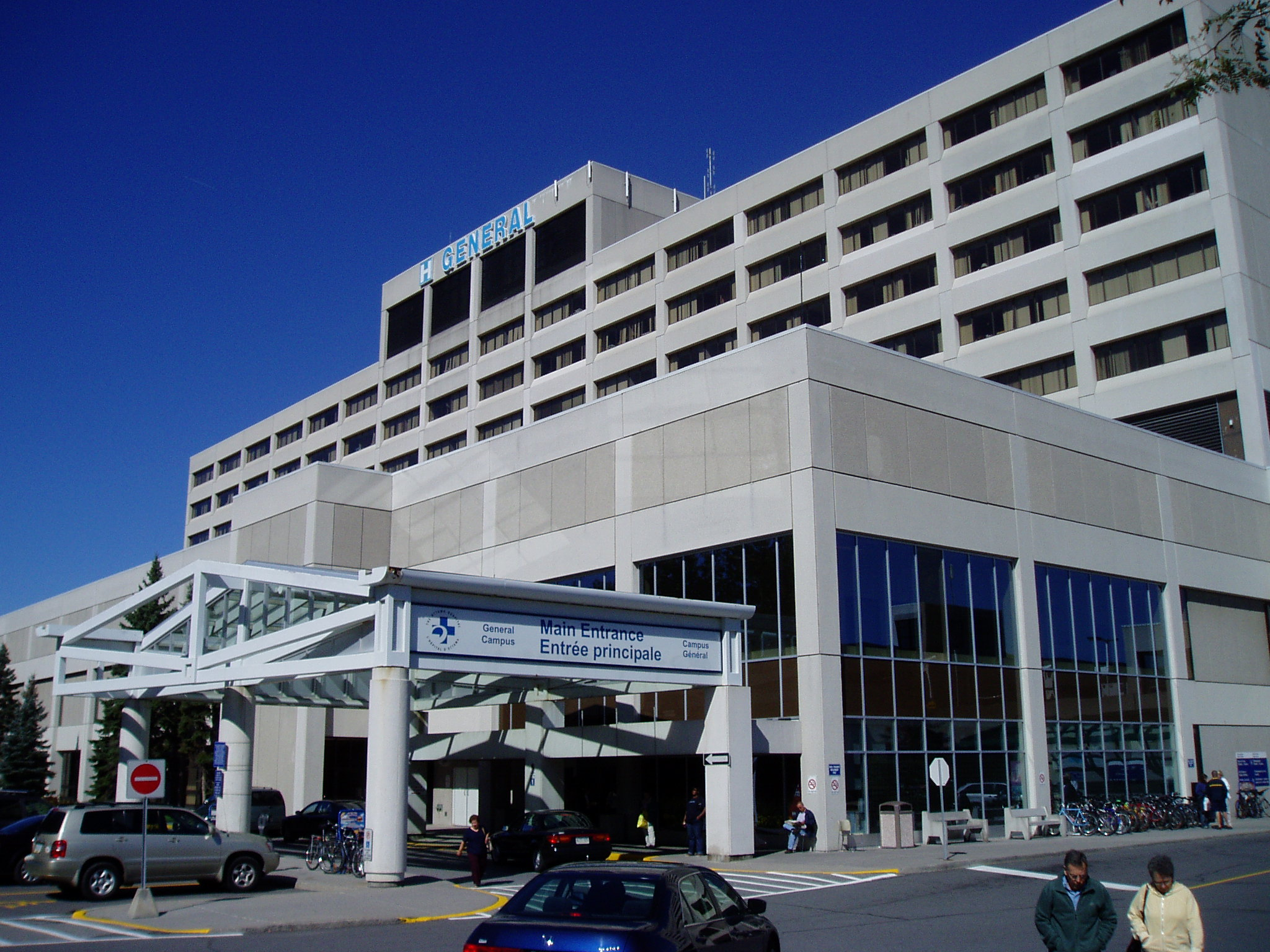

Geography
- Location: 501 Smyth Road; Ottawa, Ontario; K1H 8L6
- Coordinates: 45°24′05″N 75°38′50″W

Organisation
- Care system: Medicare
- Type: Teaching, District General
- Affiliated university: University of Ottawa

Services
- Emergency department: Yes
- Beds: 569

The Ottawa Hospital's General Campus is one of three main campuses of The Ottawa Hospital in Ottawa, Ontario, Canada. With 569 beds, the General Campus includes The Ottawa Hospital Rehabilitation Centre and the Cancer Centre.

The Ottawa General Hospital opened in 1845 at the current site of the Élisabeth Bruyère Hospital in the ByWard Market area of Ottawa. In 1980, the General moved to its current location at 501 Smyth Road.

== History ==
- 1845 – The building for the General Hospital was purchased for $240 and was run by Élisabeth Bruyère and the Grey Nuns.
- 1862-1866 – The General Hospital moved to Water and Sussex streets.
- 1866 – The first surgical operation was performed.
- 1897 – The General Hospital begin to accept and train interns.
- 1918 – A major fire damaged the General Hospital.
- 1947 – A clinical teaching program was set up with the University of Ottawa.
- 1950s – The General Hospital was the first to be affiliated with the University of Ottawa School of Medicine.
- 1957 – The first autologous human bone marrow in Canada was administered.
- 1967 – The first synovectomy in Canada was performed.
- 1976 – The first self-financing drug information service in North America was developed.
- 1978 – The General Hospital was the first in Canada to offer pharmacy-based clinical toxicology consulting service.
- 1980 – The General Hospital moved to its current site at 501 Smyth Rd.
- 1986 – Noëlla Leclair received Canada's first Jarvik-7 artificial heart.
- 1988 – The first bone marrow transplant in Canada between unrelated donors was performed.
- 1989 – The University of Ottawa Eye Institute opened.
- 1996 – The Ottawa General Hospital Research Institute was founded by Dr. Ronald Worton.
- 1998 – The Civic, General and Riverside hospitals amalgamated to form The Ottawa Hospital.
- 2009 – The Ottawa Hospital Cancer Centre opened.

== Services and programs ==
The University of Ottawa Eye Institute – a major clinical, teaching and research centre in Canada for ophthalmology – is located at the General Campus. The Ottawa Hospital Rehabilitation Centre – part of the Integrated Rehabilitation Program – is also located at the General Campus.

The Ottawa Hospital Cancer Program is a comprehensive cancer program serving the Champlain LHIN. As the “hub” of this Regional Cancer Program, The Ottawa Hospital operates a Cancer Centre with two sites – one at the General Campus and the other at the Irving Greenberg Family Cancer Centre, located on the grounds of the Queensway Carleton Hospital.

Established in 2000, the Kidney Research Centre was Canada's first research facility devoted exclusively to investigating diseases that attack the kidney. It is affiliated with the Ottawa Hospital Research Institute, the University of Ottawa and The Ottawa Hospital.

In 2012, the Blood Disease Centre opened with a focus on practice-changing research and patient care in the diagnosis, treatment and prevention of blood disorders.
