= Hurdman station =

Mass transit station in Ottawa, Canada

Hurdman
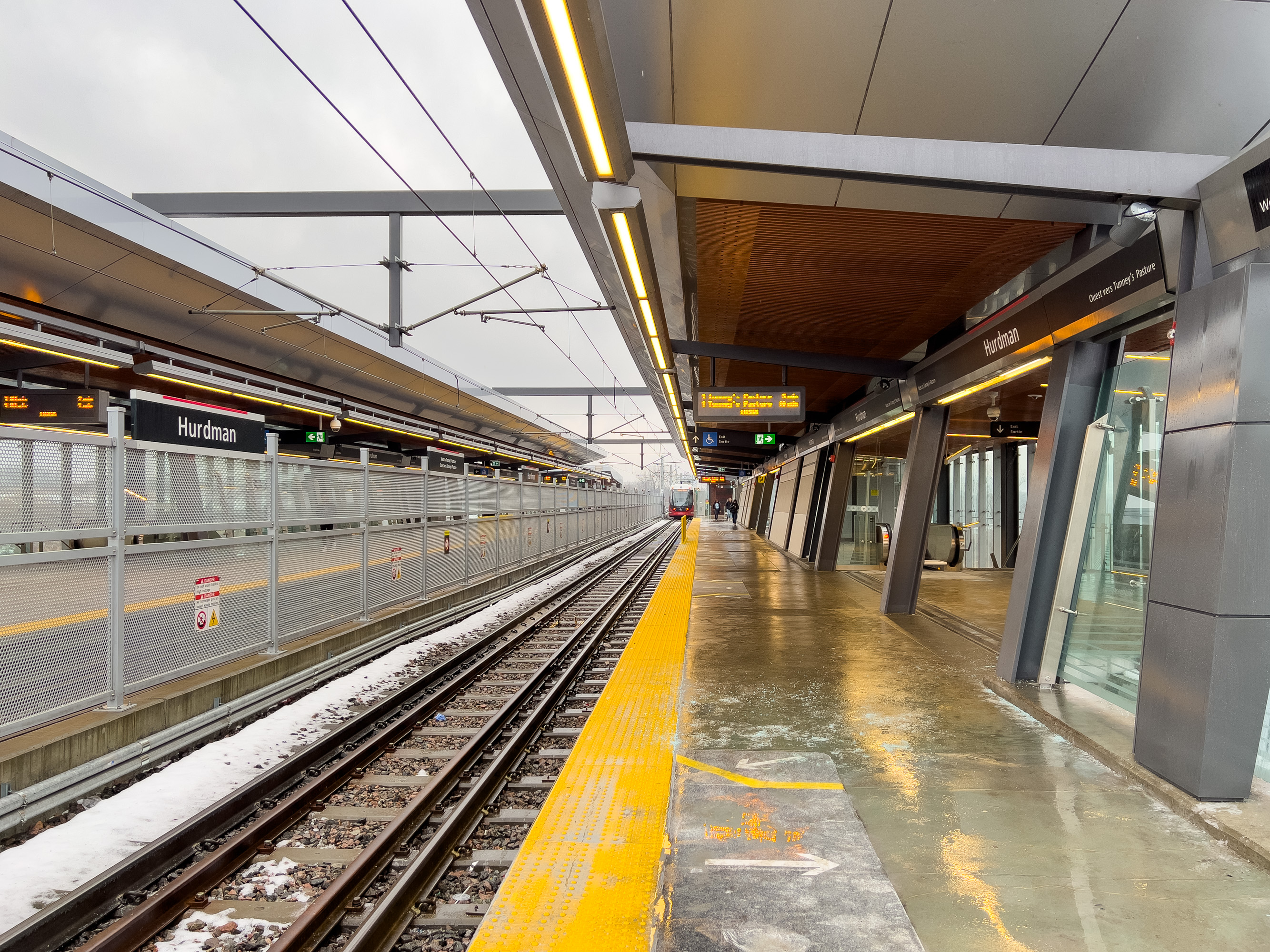
- Hurdman station, platform level

General information
- Location: Ottawa, Ontario; Canada
- Coordinates: 45°24′44″N 75°39′46″W
- Owner: OC Transpo
- Platforms: Side platforms
- Tracks: 2
- Bus stands: 6

Construction
- Parking: No
- Cycle facilities: Yes
- Accessible: Yes

Other information
- Station code: 560# 3023

History
- Opened: 1983
- Rebuilt: 2015–2019

Services
Preceding station	OC Transpo	Following station
Lees toward Tunney's Pasture	Line 1	Tremblay toward Blair
Lycée Claudel toward Hospital	Route 45	Terminus
Lycée Claudel toward Hawthorne	Route 98	Terminus
Lycée Claudel toward Airport	Route 105	Tremblay toward St-Laurent
Former services
Preceding station	OC Transpo	Following station
Lycée Claudel toward Airport	Route 97 Closed April 2025	Terminus
Lycée Claudel toward Barrhaven Centre	Route 99 Truncated April 2025	Terminus
Location

Hurdman station is a major station on Ottawa's O-Train Line 1, and bus rapid transit (BRT) system, Transitway.

== Location ==
The station is located southeast of Hurdman Bridge, and south of where Highway 417 crosses the Rideau River. It is also located near the intersection of Industrial Avenue and Riverside Drive/Vanier Parkway.

There are connections from Hurdman station to the nearby neighbourhood of Riverview to the east, with a bus-only road connecting to Alta Vista Drive. There are also connections for bicycle users, as Hurdman station is located near to the Rideau River bicycle path.

The station and nearby landmarks, Hurdman Park, Hurdman Road, and Hurdman Bridge, are named for the region's early settlers. The station featured a small convenience store, which closed with the original station. The site is relatively isolated, almost surrounded by protected green space, with a few high-rise buildings on adjacent Riverside Drive. To the immediate south are two large artificial hills covering a former city landfill.

== Transitway ==
Hurdman Station was opened in 1983 as part of the first phase of the Transitway, Ottawa's bus rapid transit system. It was one of the transitway's busiest stations. Previously, it was the station where the main transitway route from downtown to the west branched off in two directions: one to the east toward Orléans and the other toward South Ottawa. Connexion routes serving Kanata and Barrhaven used to have Hurdman Station as the downtown terminus before September 2013.

The original station was closed in September 2015 and was replaced with a temporary station for the duration of construction of the O-Train's Confederation Line. Demolition of the old station structure was completed in November 2015.

On September 3, 2017, Route 40 (originally Route 114) was extended to start/end at Hurdman station during peak hours, so that what is now Route 74 was extended from Nepean Woods to start/end at Riverview station on July 19, 2014. However, on June 20, 2021, Route 40 was shortened to start/end at Greenboro station during peak hours, so that it originally did as Route 114.

It fully reopened on September 14, 2019, when Confederation Line service began. It remains the terminus of the transitway to South Ottawa, as well as serving local lines.

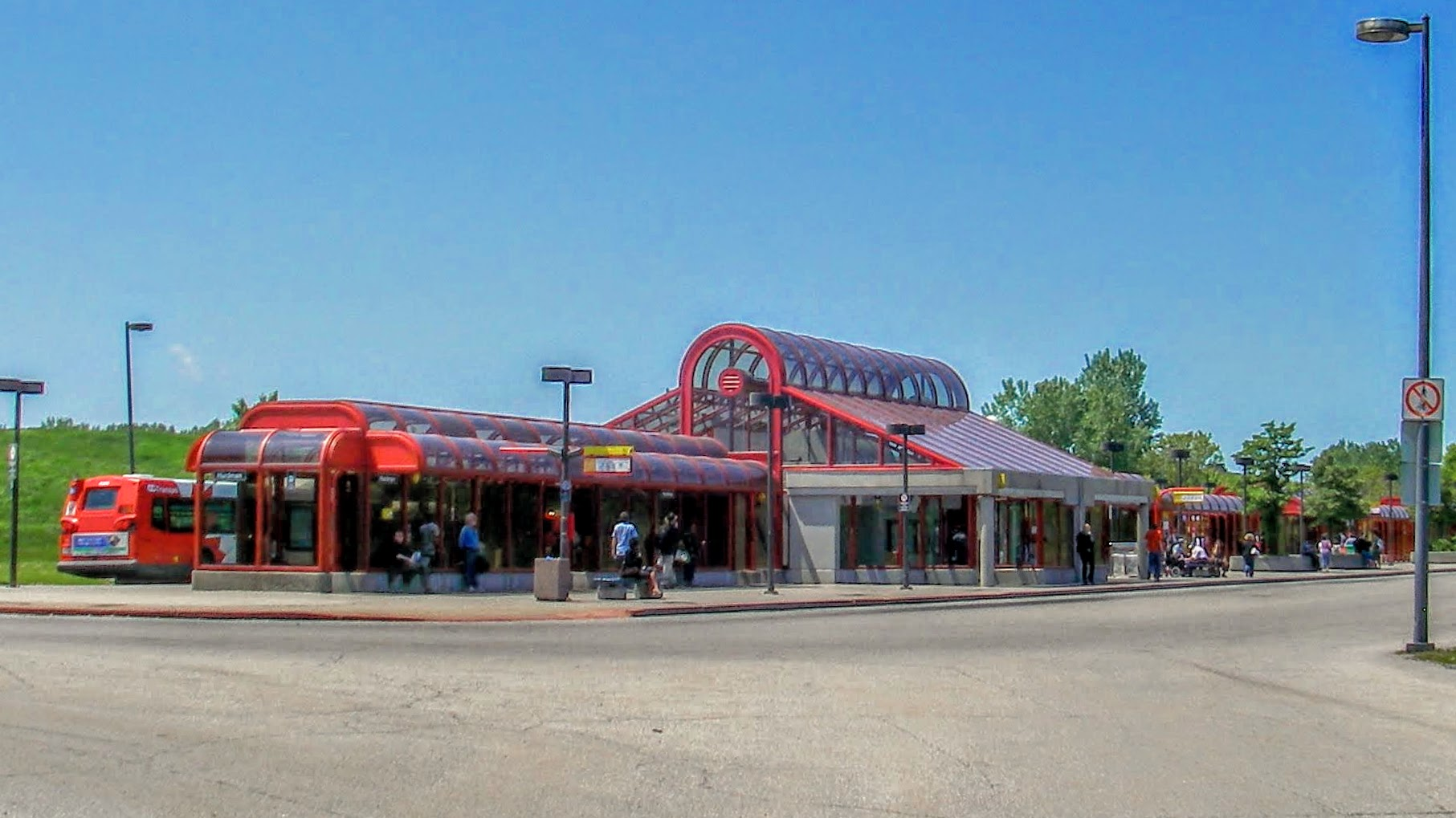
Hurdman station from the northeast in 2009.

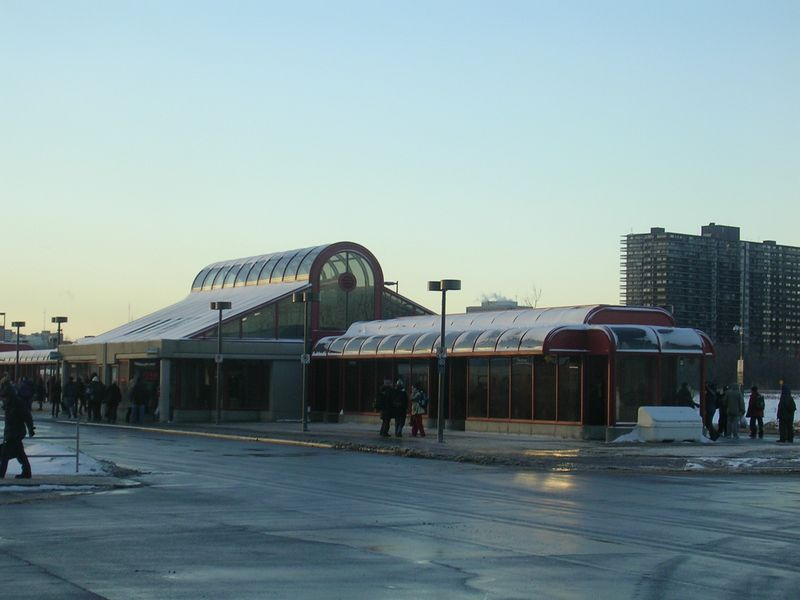
Hurdman station from the southeast in 2005

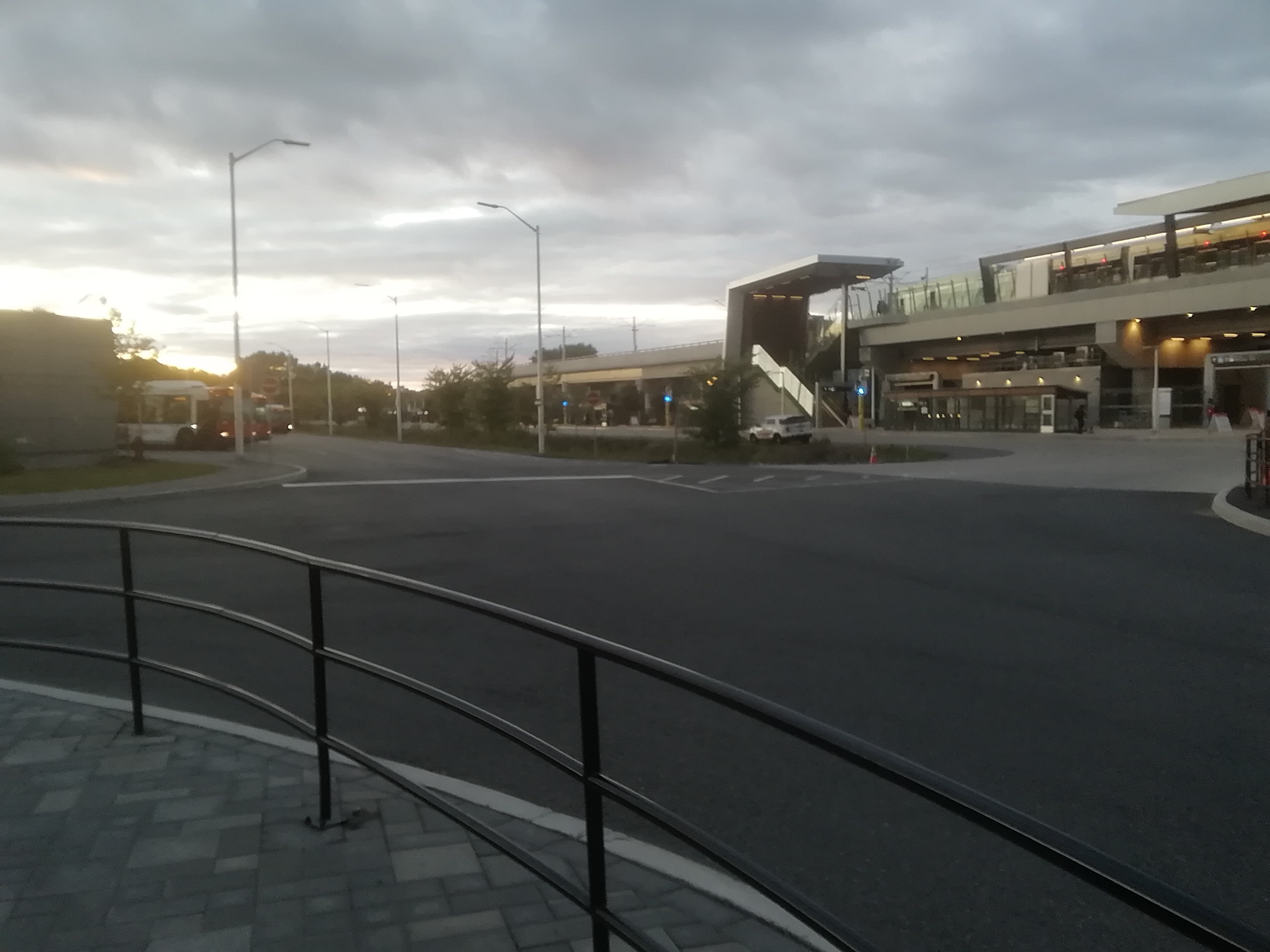
Hurdman station from the same vantage point in 2019

== Layout ==
Hurdman station is an elevated side platform station; a large concourse is located at ground level and contains the ticket barrier, as well as fare-paid zone access to the Transitway terminal loop, allowing transfer between buses and the train without needing to show a transfer. Elevators and escalators are available at the entrance from the ticket barrier side of the station (eastern end). Additional stairwells at the western end of the platforms give direct access to the Transitway terminal.

The station's artwork, Coordinated Movement by Jill Anholt, is a curved sculpture suspended along the station access opposite the ticket barrier.

== Service ==
The following routes serve Hurdman station as of May 31, 2025:

Key
Line 1 (O-Train) Line 2 (O-Train) Line 4 (O-Train)	O-Train
E1	Shuttle Express
R1 R2 R4	O-Train replacement bus routes
N75	Night routes
40 12	Frequent routes
99 162	Local routes
275	Connexion routes
303	Shopper routes
405	Event routes
646	School routes
STO	Société de transport de l'Outaouais routes
Additional info: Line 1: Confederation Line; Line 2: Trillium Line; Line 4: Airport Link; Routes 5 to 199: Custom routing that that connects to Line 1 and/or 2; Routes 200 to 299: Connexion (peak-period only routes that connect to the O-Train); Routes 301 to 305: Shopper Routes (limited rural service); Routes 404 to 406: Canadian Tire Centre events; Routes 450 to 456: Lansdowne Park events; Routes 600 to 699: School Routes; Route R1: replaces Line 1 when it is out of service; Route R2: replaces Line 2 when it is out of service; Route R4: replaces Line 4 when it is out of service; Routes N39 to N98: night service (replaces Line 1 and N98 replaces Line 4); White backgrounds: limited service; Last two digits represent service area: 00s and 10s – Central; 20s – Gloucester; 30s – Orléans; 40s – Ottawa East; 50s – Ottawa West; 60s – Kanata, Stittsville; 70s – Barrhaven; 80s – Nepean; 90s – South Keys

Stop	Routes
East O-Train	Line 1 (O-Train)
West O-Train	Line 1 (O-Train)
A Night Routes	N39 N45 N105
B Rail Replacement and Drop-Off	R1
C South	10 45 88 98 105 110
D South	9 19 42 44 48 49 90 92 451
E East	105 609 628 647

Notes:

- There is a Stop F located at the other end of the bus loop, which is currently only used for regional transit lines.
- Stop A is the only night stop at Hurdman. After 9 PM, all routes will serve stop A.
