= Children's Hospital of Eastern Ontario =

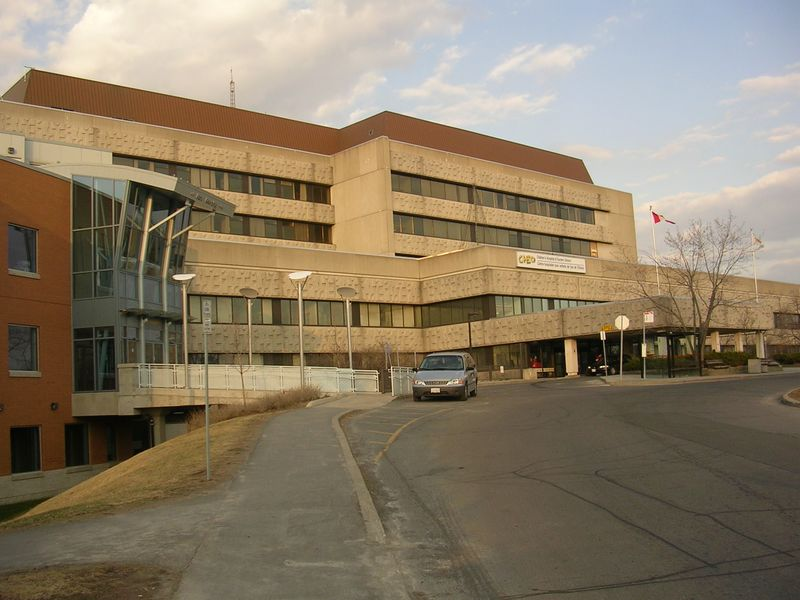
- The main entrance to CHEO

- Location in Ottawa

Geography
- Location: Ottawa, Ontario, Canada
- Coordinates: 45°24′04″N 75°39′05″W

Organization
- Care system: Medicare, OHIP
- Type: Pediatric, teaching, specialist, research
- Affiliated university: University of Ottawa

Services
- Emergency department: Level I Trauma Centre
- Beds: 167

Helipads
- Helipad: TC LID: CPK7

History
- Founded: 1974

Links
- Website: www.cheo.on.ca
- Lists: Hospitals in Canada

The Children's Hospital of Eastern Ontario — Ottawa Children's Treatment Centre, commonly known by its acronym CHEO (/ˈtʃioʊ/ CHEE-oh), is a children's hospital and tertiary trauma centre for children and youth located in Ottawa, Ontario, Canada. CHEO serves patients from eastern Ontario, northern Ontario, Nunavut, and the Outaouais region of Quebec. Last year, 750,000 patients visited CHEO.

CHEO first opened its doors on May 17, 1974 at 401 Smyth Road in Ottawa. The site includes a hospital, children's treatment centre, school and research institute, with satellite services located throughout eastern Ontario. CHEO, which is affiliated with the University of Ottawa, provides complex pediatric care, research and education. It is a partner of the Kids Come First Health team and a founding member of Kids Health Alliance, a network of partners.

== Funding ==
CHEO is funded by the Government of Ontario as well as by a variety of public donations. One of the hospital's major sources of funding is the CHEO Foundation, which was incorporated in 1974.

== Hospital characteristics (2024-2025) ==
- Services:
  - 7,448 admissions to CHEO
  - 71,273 emergency department visits
  - 630,717 outpatient visits
  - 79,190 community program visits
- Facility (2024–2025):
  - 142 budgeted inpatient beds
- Research Institute
  - 73,800 sq feet of research space
  - 676 staff and trainees
  - 299 scientists and clinical investigators
  - 780 active research grants
  - 634 active studies recruiting patients
  - 546 publications
  - 73,283 patients & families involved in research
- Personnel (2024-25):
  - 4,300 members, of which there are:
  - 3,400 nurses and other specialized health professionals and staff
  - 630 privileged medical staff
  - 250 researchers
  - 3,000+ learners in medicine, nursing and other health professions
  - 400 volunteers

== Timeline ==
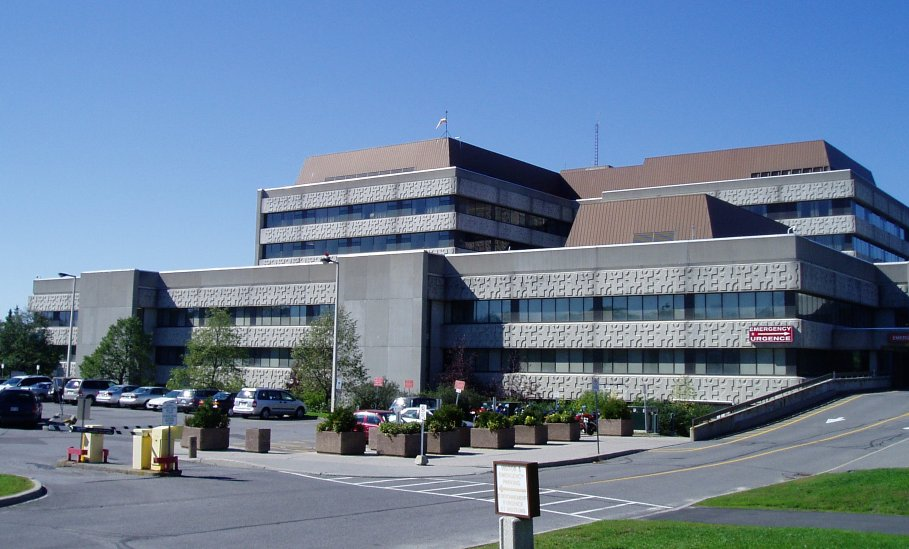
The back of the CHEO building

CHEO was formed in 1974 due to the efforts of the community requesting a bilingual healthcare centre for children and the approval by the provincial government.

== See also ==
- List of children's hospitals
