= The Ottawa Hospital =

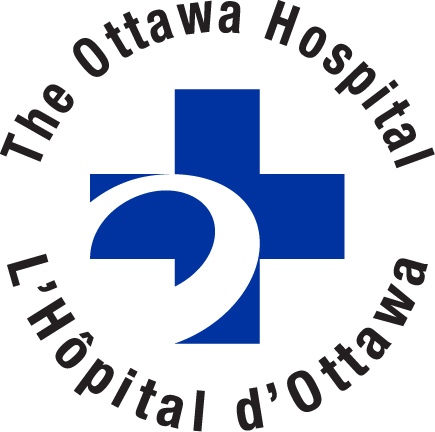

Geography
- Location: Ottawa, Ontario, Canada

Organization
- Care system: Public Medicare (Canada) (OHIP)
- Type: Teaching
- Affiliated university: University of Ottawa

Services
- Emergency department: Level I Trauma Centre
- Beds: 1,186

Helipads
- Helipad: TC LID: CPP7

History
- Founded: 1998

Links
- Website: www.ottawahospital.on.ca
- Lists: Hospitals in Canada

The Ottawa Hospital (French: L'Hôpital d'Ottawa) is a hospital system in Ottawa, Ontario, Canada. The system was formed through the merger of the former Grace Hospital, Ottawa Riverside Hospital, Ottawa General Hospital and Ottawa Civic Hospital. The system is affiliated with the University of Ottawa, and its three campuses are all non-profit, public teaching hospitals (the University of Ottawa Heart Institute is located at the hospital's Civic Campus).

The Ottawa Hospital's Civic Campus is also one of the two trauma centres serving Eastern Ontario and southern Quebec. The other is the Children's Hospital of Eastern Ontario, accommodating juvenile and adolescent patients.

The Ottawa Hospital's General Campus is home to the Ottawa Hospital Cancer Centre, the main site of the Ottawa Hospital Cancer Program and the Champlain Regional Cancer Program. This program runs in conjunction with the Irving Greenberg Family Cancer Centre located at the Queensway Carleton Hospital, located on the western side of Ottawa, also operated by the Ottawa Hospital. The General Campus provides specialized in and outpatient services for hematological diseases, as well as radiation and medical oncology.

== Research ==
The Ottawa Hospital Research Institute (OHRI) is a non-profit academic health research institute that is part of The Ottawa Hospital, and a major part of the University of Ottawa Faculties of Medicine and Health Science.

Formed on April 1, 2001, by the merger of the Loeb Health Research Institute and the Ottawa Health Research Institute, the OHRI is a multi-campus facility with more than 2,000 scientists, clinician investigators, trainees and staff. These researchers are studying more than a hundred different diseases, conditions and specialties with an overall focus on translating discoveries and knowledge into better health.

== Riverside Hospital of Ottawa ==
Riverside Hospital of Ottawa
- The Ottawa Hospital
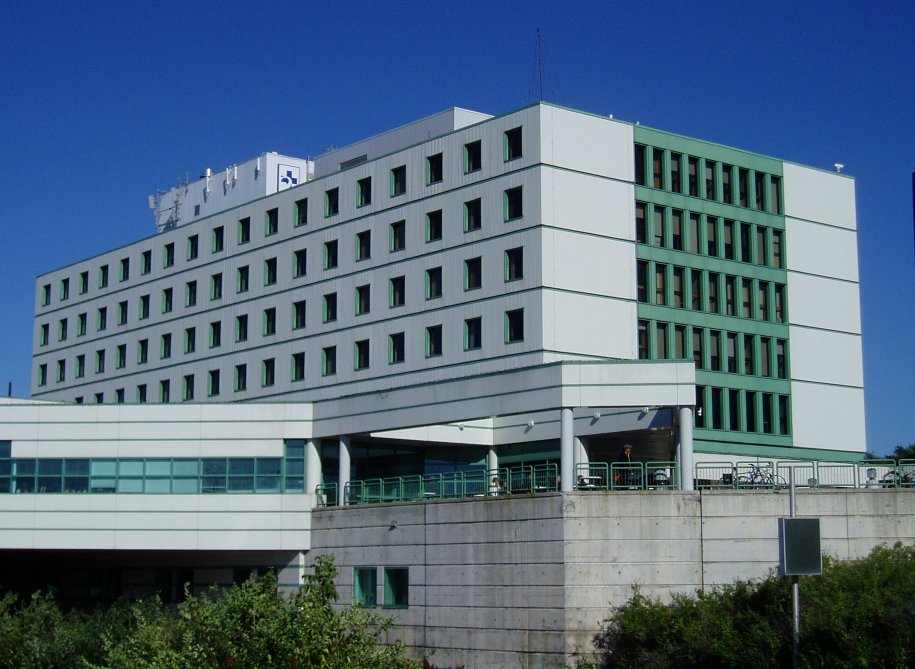

Geography
- Location: 1967 Riverside Drive; Ottawa, Ontario; K1H 7W9
- Coordinates: 45.396°N 75.669°W

Organisation
- Care system: Medicare
- Type: Teaching
- Affiliated university: University of Ottawa

Services
- Emergency department: No
- Beds: 0

The Ottawa Hospital's Riverside Campus is one of three main campuses of The Ottawa Hospital – along with the Civic and General campuses, and is the only campus that does not admit patients and has no emergency department. The facility operates for out-patient treatment and procedures during the day Monday - Friday.

The Riverside Hospital of Ottawa first opened in 1967 on Riverside Drive close to where the current General campus and the Children's Hospital of Eastern Ontario is located on Smyth Road. On 1 April 1998 the hospital was amalgamated with the Civic Hospital and the General Hospital into The Ottawa Hospital.

The hospital is also the Riverside station for OC Transpo.

The hospital is home to the Kidney Research Centre, a centre within the Ottawa Hospital Research Institute. The centre was established in 2000 and is the first place in Canada dedicated to kidney research.

In addition, the hospital is home to the Shirley E. Greenberg Women's Health Centre. The centre is dedicated to research, education, and helping women improve their health. The centre sees 30,000 patients a year.

=== Book ===
The book Making waves: a history of the Riverside Hospital of Ottawa recounts the hospital's long history.

== Helipads ==
The General Campus shares the ground level helipad located next to CHEO for ground ambulance transfers to the General.

There is a helipad located at the hospital's Civic Campus located across Carling Avenue. The helipad is used by Medevac as the majority of landings take place there as the Civic Campus is the site of Ottawa's Level 1 Trauma Centre for adults.
