= Smyth Road =

Ottawa, Canada street

Smyth Road (/smaɪθ/) (Ottawa Road #72), is a main road in eastern Ottawa, Ontario, Canada. It runs from Riverside Drive to St. Laurent Boulevard. This residential area was developed in the 1950s. The street was originally lined with large elm trees, giving the area the name Elmvale Acres.

Smyth Road is home to two of the three campuses of the Ottawa Hospital, including Riverside Hospital, located near Riverside Drive, the Southeast OC Transpo Transitway, Alta Vista Drive and the Rideau River. It also includes the Ottawa General Hospital located in a large medical complex which includes the Children's Hospital of Eastern Ontario , the Ottawa Children's Treatment Centre , the Rehabilitation Centre, the Regional Cancer Centre, and the University of Ottawa's Medical Campus, which houses the Faculty of Medicine (also known as the Health Sciences Centre).

== History ==
Smyth Road was frequently known as Smith Road or John Smith Road until about 1950. The road is named for John Smyth, a benefactor of the Trinity Anglican Church, and his father, William Smyth, an early pioneer of the region. Their family name was originally "Smith".

== See also ==
- List of Ottawa, Ontario roads
