= Ottawa South (federal electoral district) =

Federal electoral district in Ontario, Canada

Coordinates: 45°21′33.372″N 75°39′51.69″W

Ontario electoral district
- Interactive map of riding boundaries from the 2025 federal election

Federal electoral district
- Legislature: House of Commons
MP
David McGuinty
Liberal
- District created: 1987
- First contested: 1988
- Last contested: 2021
- District webpage: profile, map

Demographics
- Population (2016): 121,058
- Electors (2021): 92,759
- Area (km²): 73.26
- Pop. density (per km²): 1,652.4
- Census division: Ottawa
- Census subdivision: Ottawa (part)

Ottawa South (French: Ottawa-Sud) is a federal electoral district in Ottawa, Ontario, Canada. It is represented in the House of Commons of Canada by David McGuinty, brother of former Premier of Ontario and Ottawa South MPP Dalton McGuinty. It has been held continuously by Liberal candidates since it was first contested in 1988, and is regarded as one of the strongest Liberal ridings in Canada. Ottawa South is a suburban, generally middle class riding, notable for having the highest Arab population in Ontario.

== Geography ==
The riding is located within the city of Ottawa. It is bounded on the north and east by Highway 417, on the west by the Rideau River and on the south by a line beginning at the Rideau River and Hunt Club Road, then east to Limebank Road, south to Leitrim Road, east to the CP Rail line, north to Lester Road, then east along Lester and Davidson Road to Conroy Road, north to Hunt Club Road and east along Hunt Club and its prolongation to Highway 417. Neighbouring districts include Ottawa—Vanier to the north, Orléans to the east, Carleton to the south and Ottawa West—Nepean and Ottawa Centre to the west.

Ottawa South comprises the neighbourhoods of Riverview, Eastway Gardens, Alta Vista, Riverside Park, Billings Bridge, Heron Park, Mooney's Bay, Hunt Club Woods, Hunt Club Estate, Hunt Club Chase, South Keys, Ellwood, Heron Gate, Sheffield Glen, Airport-Uplands, Elizabeth Park, Windsor Park Village, and Blossom Park in the city of Ottawa. The total area is 76 km^{2} (29 sq mi). There are 233 polling divisions.

== Party support ==
The Liberal Party has held the riding since its creation in 1988. The closest election was a 7% Liberal win in 2006. The riding has voted Liberal even during Progressive Conservative and Conservative governments. The New Democratic Party received its greatest level of support in the 2021 election at 19%. The Greens saw their highest vote here in 2008 with 7%.

== Political geography ==
The Liberals have support in most parts of the riding. In the 2004 election, the strongest Liberal areas were in the Alta Vista neighbourhood. However, in the 2006 election, they lost some of this support, but it was gained from lower income areas such as Heron Gate. By 2008, the Liberals had gained much of their support back in Alta Vista.

The Conservatives have their strongest amount in the southern parts of the riding, especially in the community of Blossom Park and around the Macdonald-Cartier International Airport By 2006, the Conservatives had won the neighbourhood of Elmvale Acres, but this was lost in 2008. The New Democrats have only won one poll in recent memory, and that was a poll in Heron Gate in 2004.

== Demographics ==
According to the 2021 Canadian census

Ethnic groups: 52.2% White, 14.7% Black, 12.4% Arab, 4.9% South Asian, 3.6% Indigenous, 3.3% Chinese, 2.2% Filipino, 1.8% Latin American, 1.6% West Asian, 1.2% Southeast Asian,
Languages: 51.1% English, 10.6% French, 9.7% Arabic, 2.1% Somali, 1.8% Spanish, 1.5% Mandarin, 1.0% Italian, 1.0% Tagalog
Religions: 51.1% Christian (28.0% Catholic, 3.4% Anglican, 3.1% Christian Orthodox, 2.7% United Church, 1.3% Pentecostal, 12.6% Other), 18.1% Muslim, 1.6% Hindu, 1.1% Jewish, 25.9% None
Median income: $42,000 (2020)
Average income: $55,600 (2020)

== Riding associations ==
Riding associations are the local branches of national political parties:

The list of registered riding associations is available from Elections Canada.

Party	Association name	President	HQ City
Conservative	Ottawa South Conservative Association	Michael McNeil	Ottawa
Green	Ottawa South Green Party Association	Nira Dookeran	Ottawa
Liberal	Ottawa South Federal Liberal Association	Richard Pommainville	Ottawa
New Democratic	Ottawa South Federal NDP Riding Association	Morgan K. Gay	Ottawa
People's	Ottawa South PPC Association	Xavier A. Bolanos	Ottawa

== History ==
The district was created in 1987. 65.7% was from Ottawa—Carleton, 20.1% from Ottawa Centre and 14.2% from Ottawa—Vanier. At the time, it was bounded on the west by the Rideau River, on the north by the Queensway, on the east by the city limits at the time, and on the south by the following line (from west to east beginning at the Rideau River): Ottawa city limits, River Road, Limebank Road, Leitrim Road, Canadian Pacific Railway, Lester Road (allowance for a road between lots 10 and 11, Concession 3 in Gloucester Township, Albion Road, Walkley Road.

=== 1996 Redistribution ===
Following the 1996 redistribution, the riding added the neighbourhood of Hunt Club Park from Carleton—Gloucester, by changing the southeastern boundary to the city limits at the time (from Walkley to Conroy).

=== 2003 Redistribution ===
Following the 2003 redistribution, the riding's eastern boundary was changed to Highway 417 from the former city limits. The boundary would follow Highway 417 from the Rideau River until Hunt Club Road. This shift added in a small piece of territory that was in Ottawa—Vanier and Ottawa—Orléans riding.

=== 2012 Redistribution ===
Only a minor change to the riding's boundaries occurred followed the 2012 redistribution of Canada's ridings. Ottawa South lost all of its territory south of Hunt Club Road and West of Riverside Drive. This area, which only had 27 people as of the Canada 2011 Census was transferred to the new riding of Carleton.

=== 2022 Redistribution ===
The 2022 Federal Redistribution pushed the riding boundaries southward to encompass the growing neighbourhood of Findlay Creek, formerly part of the Carleton riding. It also took away the north-west corner of the riding. The area between the Rideau River and Bank Street in the east to the Railway Tracks to the south, encompassing the neighbourhoods of Riverside Park, Billings Bridge and Heron Park were moved to the Ottawa Centre riding. The new boundaries came into effect upon the calling of the 2025 Canadian federal election.

== Members of Parliament ==
The riding has elected the following members of Parliament:

Parliament	Years	Member	Party
Ottawa South; Riding created from Ottawa—Carleton, Ottawa Centre and Ottawa—Vanier
34th	1988–1993	John Manley	Liberal
35th	1993–1997	John Manley	Liberal
36th	1997–2000	John Manley	Liberal
37th	2000–2004	John Manley	Liberal
38th	2004–2006	David McGuinty	Liberal
39th	2006–2008	David McGuinty	Liberal
40th	2008–2011	David McGuinty	Liberal
41st	2011–2015	David McGuinty	Liberal
42nd	2015–2019	David McGuinty	Liberal
43rd	2019–2021	David McGuinty	Liberal
44th	2021–2025	David McGuinty	Liberal
45th	2025–present	David McGuinty	Liberal

=== Current member of Parliament ===
The member of Parliament (MP) for Ottawa South is David McGuinty, a former businessman, immigration officer, lawyer and professor. He was first elected in 2004. He is a member of the Liberal Party of Canada.

== Election results ==
Graph of election results in Ottawa South (minor parties that never got 2% of the vote or didn't run consistently are omitted) View source data.

=== 2025 ===
Incumbent Liberal MP David McGuinty ran again, and was challenged by police officer Blair Turner of the Conservatives. Turner is the son of former Progressive Conservative MP for Ottawa—Carleton Barry Turner. Running for the NDP was civil servant Hena Masjedee, and the Green candidate was community organizer Nira Dookeran.

2025 Canadian federal election
Party	Candidate	Votes	%	±%	Expenditures
Liberal	David McGuinty	43,388	65.18	+15.77	$84,089.33
Conservative	Blair Turner	18,010	27.06	+0.09	$135,029.53
New Democratic	Hena Masjedee	4,017	6.03	–12.09	$35,097.74
Green	Nira Dookeran	642	0.96	–1.23	$3,039.50
Christian Heritage	Alex Perrier	259	0.39	N/A	$717.11
Rhinoceros	William Cooper	155	0.23	N/A	$0.00
Canadian Future	John Redins	93	0.14	N/A	$0.00
Total valid votes/expense limit		66,564	99.25	+0.21	$141,803.28
Total rejected ballots		503	0.75	–0.21	
Turnout		67,067	69.17	+3.41	
Eligible voters		96,956			
Liberal notional hold		Swing		+7.84	
Source: Elections Canada

=== 2021 ===
2021 federal election redistributed results
Party	Vote	%
Liberal	29,250	49.41
Conservative	15,963	26.97
New Democratic	10,729	18.12
People's	1,829	3.09
Green	1,300	2.20
Communist	124	0.21
Total valid votes	59,195	99.04
Rejected ballots	575	0.96
Registered voters/ estimated turnout	90,887	65.76

Incumbent Liberal MP David McGuinty faced a re-match against local businessman Eli Tannis of the Conservative Party. The NDP ran national security expert Huda Mukbil. McGuinty easily won re-election with a slightly reduced majority, while the NDP had its strongest federal result in the riding's history, besting its prior high-water mark in 2011.

2021 Canadian federal election: Ottawa South
Party	Candidate	Votes	%	±%	Expenditures
Liberal	David McGuinty	29,038	48.81	-3.51	$90,172.30
Conservative	Eli Tannis	15,497	26.05	+1.54	$109,078.40
New Democratic	Huda Mukbil	11,514	19.35	+3.36	$30,779.59
People's	Chylow Hall	1,898	3.19	+2.09	$5,112.54
Green	Les Schram	1,401	2.35	-3.22	$1,305.45
Communist	Larry Wasslen	144	0.24	+0.09	$0.00
Total valid votes/expense limit		59,529	99.04	–	$118,434.85
Total rejected ballots		575	0.96	+0.09	
Turnout		60,069	66.71	-4.39	
Eligible voters		90,041			
Liberal hold		Swing		-2.52	
Source: Elections Canada

=== 2019 ===
Incumbent MP David McGuinty ran for re-election, and was challenged by Conservative Eli Tannis, a Lebanese-Canadian entrepreneur, New Democrat Morgan Gay, a community organizer and Green Les Schram, a self employed consultant. Despite winning 5,000 fewer votes than he had four years earlier, he easily held off the challenge from his nearest (Conservative) rival, with more than double the latter's total.

2019 Canadian federal election: Ottawa South
Party	Candidate	Votes	%	±%	Expenditures
Liberal	David McGuinty	34,205	52.32	-7.74	$80,576.61
Conservative	Eli Tannis	16,025	24.51	+0.21	$106,966.51
New Democratic	Morgan Gay	10,457	16.00	+4.42	none listed
Green	Les Schram	3,645	5.58	+2.66	$3,248.53
People's	Rodrigo André Bolaños	717	1.10	–	none listed
Independent	Ahmed Bouragba	141	0.22	–	$0.00
Communist	Larry Wasslen	99	0.15	-0.06	none listed
Independent	Sarmad Laith	87	0.13	–	none listed
Total valid votes/expense limit		65,376	99.13	–	
Total rejected ballots		574	0.87	+0.33	
Turnout		65,950	71.10	-2.46	
Eligible voters		92,759			
Liberal hold		Swing		-3.98	
Source: Elections Canada

=== 2015 ===
While the Liberals were the third party in Parliament, David McGuinty served as the Liberal Party's critic for Natural Resources (2011–2012), Industry (2013) and the Privy Council Office (2013–2015). He was easily re-elected in 2015 when the Liberals were swept into power. He defeated the Conservative candidate, Dev Balkissoon, a consulting firm owner by over 23,000 votes. Balkissoon was criticized during the campaign for missing an all-candidates debate. The NDP candidate was George Brown, a former Ottawa City councillor for Riverside Ward (1985–1994), and the Green candidate was John Redins, a disabilities rights activist.

2015 Canadian federal election
Party	Candidate	Votes	%	±%	Expenditures
Liberal	David McGuinty	38,831	60.06	+16.05	$119,103.32
Conservative	Dev Balkissoon	15,711	24.30	-8.98	$89,467.46
New Democratic	George Brown	7,480	11.57	-6.59	$18,683.33
Green	John Redins	1,888	2.92	-0.11	$3,221.56
Progressive Canadian	Al Gullon	366	0.57	–	–
Libertarian	Damien Wilson	237	0.37	–	$97.29
Communist	Larry Wasslen	136	0.21	–	–
Total valid votes/Expense limit		64,649	99.46		$225,034.63
Total rejected ballots		351	0.54	–	
Turnout		65,000	73.56	–	
Eligible voters		88,368			
Liberal hold		Swing		+12.52	
Source: Elections Canada

2011 federal election redistributed results
Party	Vote	%
Liberal	25,954	44.01
Conservative	19,626	33.28
New Democratic	10,709	18.16
Green	1,787	3.03
Others	895	1.52

=== 2011 ===
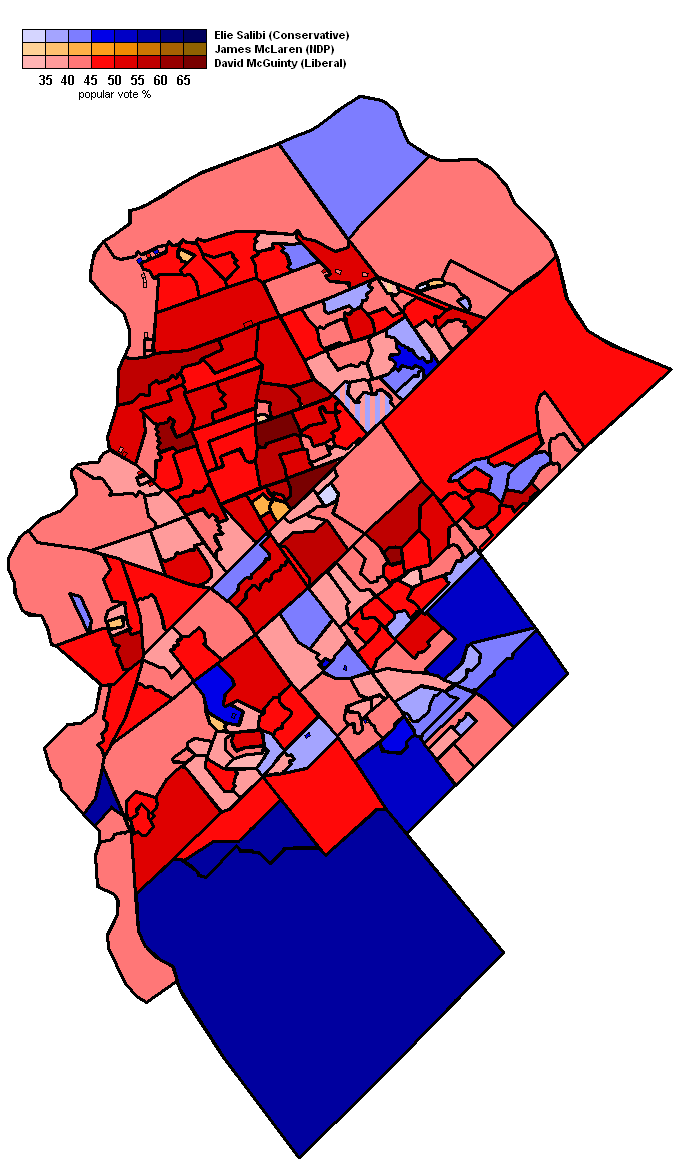
2011 election popular vote map by polling division

While in opposition, McGuinty was promoted to the position of the Official Opposition House leader. Once again, he faced and defeated Elie Salibi, the Conservative candidate. McGuinty was one of only 34 Liberals elected to the House of Commons in the election, and both he and Salibi saw a reduction in their percentage of votes. The NDP candidate, James McLaren, a teacher, had the second best (after 2021) performance for the NDP in riding history, despite a mid-campaign controversy regarding comments he made on Facebook.

2011 Canadian federal election
Party	Candidate	Votes	%	±%	Expenditures
Liberal	David McGuinty	25,963	44.01	-5.89	–
Conservative	Elie Salibi	19,634	33.28	-0.09	–
New Democratic	James McLaren	10,712	18.16	+9.71	–
Green	Mick Kitor	1,787	3.03	-3.74	–
Progressive Canadian	Al Gullon	513	0.87	-0.19	–
Pirate	Mike Bleskie	382	0.65	n.a.	–
Total valid votes		58,991	100.00	–	
Total rejected ballots		279	0.47	-0.12	
Turnout		59,270	69.11%		
Liberal hold		Swing		-5.80	
Source: Elections Canada

=== 2008 ===
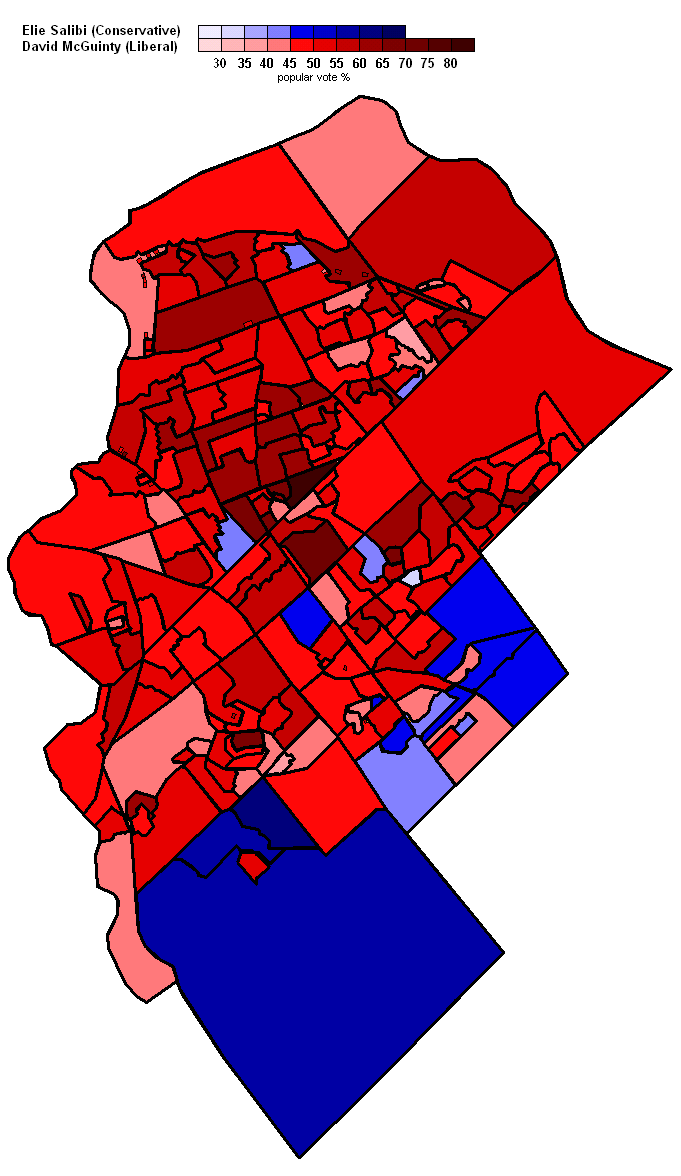
2008 election popular vote map by polling division

In opposition, McGuinty served as the Liberal Party's environment critic. He faced nominal opposition from three lesser-known candidates. The Conservative candidate was Elie Salibi, the director of international sales with Corel, who was born in Lebanon. The NDP candidate was Hijal De Sarkar, a Carleton University political science student of Bengali descent. The Green candidate was Qais Ghanem, a doctor, born in Yemen. Former Libertarian Party leader Jean-Serge Brisson also ran, as well as Al Gullon, the Progressive Canadian candidate. Facing lower turnout in the riding itself, as well as nationwide, and a strong lack of enthusiasm for the Liberal leader Stéphane Dion, McGuinty was able to increase his vote total, and his lead over his closest opponent, from the 2006 election. McGuinty just barely missed the 50% mark, but was nonetheless re-elected handily in Ottawa South.

2008 Canadian federal election
Party	Candidate	Votes	%	±%	Expenditures
Liberal	David McGuinty	29,035	49.90	+5.75	$82,793
Conservative	Elie Salibi	19,417	33.37	-4.06	$89,808
New Democratic	Hijal De Sarkar	4,920	8.45	-4.78	$5,110
Green	Qais Ghanem	3,939	6.77	+2.03	$20,330
Progressive Canadian	Al Gullon	620	1.06	+0.62	$92
Libertarian	Jean-Serge Brisson	244	0.41	–	
Total valid votes/Expense limit		58,175	100.00	$89,843	
Total rejected ballots		346	0.59	+0.11	
Turnout		58,521	66.82	-4.89	
Liberal hold		Swing		+4.91	

==== Nomination contests ====
Liberal Party of Canada
Candidate	Residence	?
David McGuinty	Ottawa	X

Conservative Party of Canada
Candidate	Residence	February 23, 2007
Elie Salibi	Ottawa	278
George M. Brown	Ottawa	182

New Democratic Party
Candidate	Residence	September 11, 2008
Hijal De Sarkar	Ottawa	X

Green Party of Canada
Candidate	Residence	June 16, 2007
Qais Ghanem	Ottawa	X
Peter Tretter	Ottawa	

=== 2006 ===
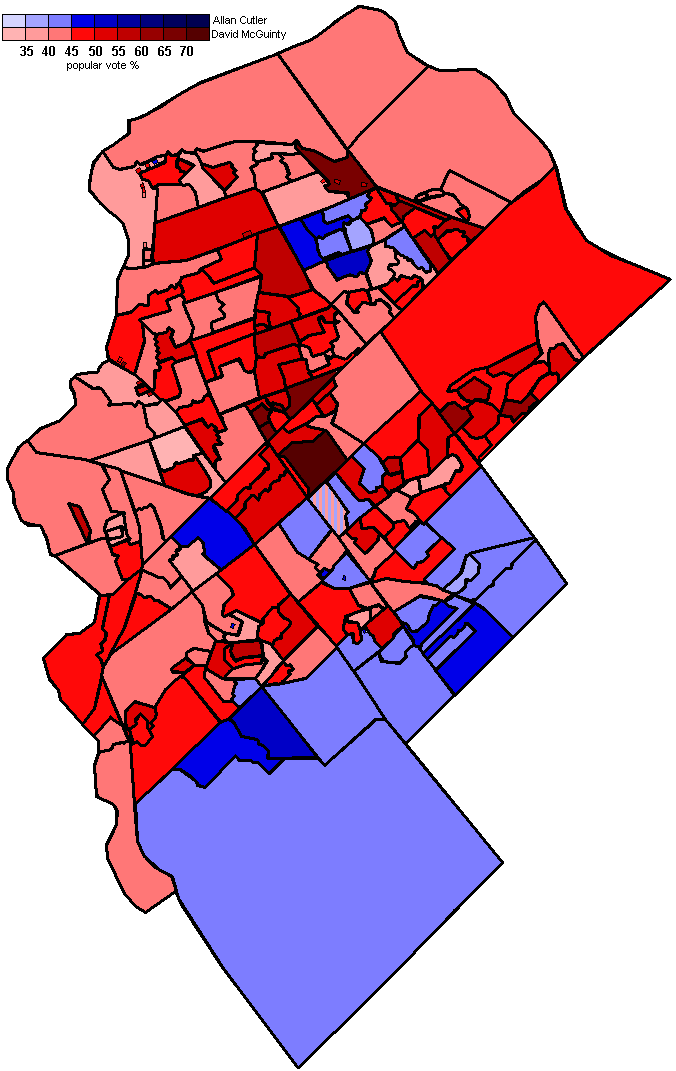
2006 election popular vote map by polling division

David McGuinty was re-elected after two years as a Liberal backbencher. The race was expected to be closer than 2004, which it was, as McGuinty faced a tough challenge from Conservative Allan Cutler. Cutler was the whistleblower in the Liberal Sponsorship Scandal which saw millions of dollars of public funds transferred to Liberal friendly firms in Quebec during the Chrétien era. The margin of victory between the liberal and his conservative challenger was closer than in 2004, but McGuinty eventually came out on top. Cutler himself was painted as a hypocrite as he would not address the issue of his nomination. Accusations started that 2004 candidate Alan Riddell was given $50,000 not to stand for nomination in the race. Riddell was also pushed aside in an earlier nomination race that saw former MP Barry Turner acclaimed, but would later drop out, forcing a new race. Running for the NDP was the Lebanese-born economist Henri Sader who faced a difficult challenge holding on to the votes that Monia Mazigh won in the previous election. Running again for Greens again was John Ford who failed to hold on to his votes, and running for the Progressive Canadian Party again was Brad Thomson who lost votes as well. Thomson had all but dropped out however, endorsing McGuinty. The Marijuana Party planned to run Tim Meehan, but he did not gain ballot access.

2006 Canadian federal election
Party	Candidate	Votes	%	±%	Expenditures
Liberal	David McGuinty	27,158	44.15	+0.33	$78,559
Conservative	Allan Cutler	23,028	37.43	+2.62	$74,021
New Democratic	Henri Sader	8,138	13.23	-0.41	$30,456
Green	John Ford	2,913	4.74	-1.00	$2,095
Progressive Canadian	Brad Thomson	273	0.44	-0.2	$2,743
Difference		4,124	6.71	-2.29	
Rejected Ballots		298	0.5	-0.1	
Turnout		61,808	71.71	+2.00	
Liberal hold		Swing		+2.29	

==== Nomination contests ====
Liberal Party of Canada
Candidate	Residence	May 9, 2005
David McGuinty	Ottawa	X

Conservative Party of Canada
Candidate	Residence	May 17, 2005
Barry Turner	Nepean	X

Barry Turner was acclaimed for the nomination when Allan Riddell, the party's candidate in 2004, withdrew because of allegations about a prank in which he was involved in university. The party later cancelled Turner's nomination and called a new meeting. Turner was not able to get an answer from the party about why the nomination was cancelled, and decided against seeking the nomination again. Allan Cutler announced that he would seek the nomination.

Conservative Party of Canada
Candidate	Residence	November 25, 2005
Allan S. Cutler	Nepean	X

New Democratic Party
Candidate	Residence	November 10, 2005
Sandra Griffith-Bonaparte	Ottawa	
Henri Sader	Ottawa	X

Green Party of Canada
Candidate	Residence	August 29, 2005
John Ford	Ottawa	X

=== 2004 ===
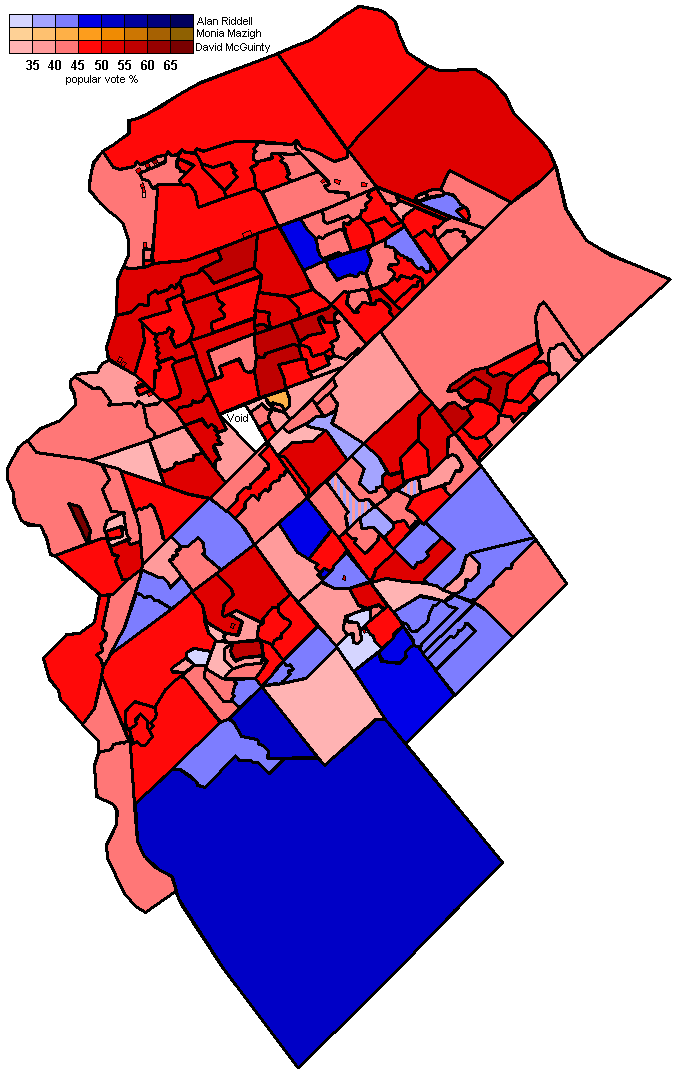
Map of the results by poll in 2004.

The riding's boundaries had very little change. 99.7% of the riding remained intact, taking 0.3% from Ottawa-Vanier. John Manley retired prior to the 2004 election. He was among a number of high-profile Liberals to retire who were known to be Jean Chrétien loyalists. David McGuinty, a lawyer and brother of Ontario Premier Dalton McGuinty, won the Liberal nomination. He was known to be a friend of Prime Minister Paul Martin. McGuinty faced a steep challenge from Alan Riddell, another lawyer, and Monia Mazigh, the NDP candidate. Riddell, the Conservative candidate, had suffered bad press when it was discovered he had been driving with a suspended license. Mazigh, who lived in Nepean, was another high-profile candidate, being the wife of Maher Arar, who was wrongly accused of terrorism. McGuinty suffered too, as his brother's government was unpopular at the time, but in the end was victorious.

2004 Canadian federal election
Party	Candidate	Votes	%	±%	Expenditures
Liberal	David McGuinty	25,956	43.82	-7.5	$74,148
Conservative	Alan Riddell	20,622	34.81	-5.3	$57,520
New Democratic	Monia Mazigh	8,080	13.64	+6.9	$73,230
Green	John Ford	3,398	5.73	n/a	$2,205
Marijuana	John Akpata	495	0.83	-0.5	
Progressive Canadian	Brad Thomson	375	0.63	n/a	$2,743
Independent	Raymond Aubin	225	0.37	n/a	$988
Marxist–Leninist	Saroj Bains	79	0.13	-0.1	
Difference		5,334	8.95	-17.9	
Rejected Ballots		361	0.61	+0.2	
Turnout		59,591	69.67	+7.7	
Liberal hold		Swing		+2.2	

^Change from 2000 is not based on redistributed results. Conservative Party change is based on the combination of Canadian Alliance and Progressive Conservative Party totals from the 2000 election.

==== Results by neighbourhood ====
Community	John Akpata		Raymond Aubin		Saroj Bains		John Ford		Monia Mazigh		David McGuinty		Alan Riddell		Brad Thomson	
Community	Mar.		Ind.		M-L		Green		NDP		Liberal		Cons.		PC Party	
Community	#	%	#	%	#	%	#	%	#	%	#	%	#	%	#	%
Eastway Gardens	4	1.1	8	2.3	1	0.3	19	5.5	25	7.2	161	46.5	127	36.7	1	0.3
Cyrville	0	0.0	4	2.2	0	0.0	12	6.5	17	9.2	91	49.2	57	30.8	4	2.2
Riverview	53	1.0	27	0.5	6	0.1	332	6.3	830	15.8	2482	47.3	1488	28.3	32	0.6
Rideau Park	9	0.7	0	0.0	0	0.0	74	6.0	106	8.6	646	52.4	393	31.9	5	0.4
Applewood Acres	4	0.4	5	0.5	0	0.0	80	7.4	134	12.4	551	50.8	304	28.0	6	0.6
Alta Vista	11	0.9	0	0.0	2	0.2	97	8.0	151	12.4	584	47.9	368	30.2	5	0.4
Ridgemont	5	0.8	3	0.5	2	0.3	54	8.4	82	12.7	305	47.4	188	29.2	5	0.8
Playfair Park	2	0.2	4	0.4	1	0.1	49	4.5	83	7.7	571	52.7	373	34.4	1	0.1
Guildwood Estates	1	0.1	0	0.0	2	0.3	37	5.2	47	6.6	389	54.3	238	33.2	3	0.4
Urbandale Acres	4	0.3	7	0.6	1	0.1	75	6.2	126	10.3	575	47.2	423	34.7	7	0.6
Elmvale Acres	14	0.8	12	0.7	2	0.1	123	6.8	214	11.8	792	43.6	649	35.8	11	0.6
Urbandale	13	0.6	11	0.5	3	0.1	168	7.6	209	9.5	979	44.4	810	36.7	13	0.6
Hawthorne Meadows	15	1.2	9	0.7	0	0.0	38	3.0	207	16.1	583	45.3	425	33.0	10	0.8
Sheffield Glen	21	1.7	5	0.4	3	0.2	55	4.4	203	16.3	534	42.9	415	33.3	9	0.7
Billings Bridge	17	1.2	10	0.7	4	0.3	74	5.4	253	18.5	619	45.2	381	27.8	12	0.9
Heron Park	7	0.8	9	1.1	2	0.2	48	5.7	143	17.0	364	43.2	266	31.6	3	0.4
Riverside Park	14	0.9	6	0.4	5	0.3	97	6.1	198	12.4	749	46.8	526	32.9	9	0.6
Mooney's Bay	4	0.4	0	0.0	1	0.1	91	8.9	111	10.8	487	47.5	329	32.1	3	0.3
Riverside Park South	9	0.8	7	0.6	2	0.2	86	7.3	137	11.6	472	40.1	459	39.0	6	0.5
Ellwood	12	1.5	6	0.8	3	0.4	41	5.2	139	17.6	359	45.4	227	28.7	4	0.5
Heron Gate	30	1.1	10	0.4	6	0.2	139	4.9	756	26.5	1150	40.3	723	25.4	38	1.3
Hunt Club Woods	18	0.9	3	0.2	2	0.1	110	5.6	272	13.9	867	44.2	677	34.5	11	0.6
Hunt Club Estate	23	1.3	2	0.1	2	0.1	124	7.0	282	15.9	751	42.4	573	32.3	16	0.9
Hunt Club Chase	20	1.2	2	0.1	0	0.0	129	7.5	205	12.0	761	44.5	580	33.9	12	0.7
Elizabeth Park	4	2.6	1	0.7	0	0.0	9	5.9	14	9.2	46	30.3	77	50.7	1	0.7
Windsor Park Village	4	1.4	1	0.3	0	0.0	23	7.8	38	13.0	88	30.0	134	45.7	5	1.7
South Keys	13	0.8	13	0.8.	2	0.1	84	5.0	221	13.2	666	39.9	663	39.7	7	0.4
Greenboro	43	0.9	11	0.2	8	0.2	225	4.9	712	15.7	1989	43.7	1536	33.8	23	0.5
Hunt Club Park	18	0.5	7	0.2	5	0.1	167	4.6	481	13.2	1717	47.1	1227	33.7	23	0.6
Blossom Park	69	1.3	25	0.5	4	0.1	307	5.7	755	14.0	2067	38.4	2117	39.3	40	0.7

==== Nomination contests ====
Liberal Party of Canada
Candidate	Residence	March 6, 2004
Camille Awada	Ottawa	
Diane Deans	Ottawa	
Sheila Gervais	Ottawa	
John Samuel	Ottawa	
David McGuinty	Ottawa	X

Conservative Party of Canada
Candidate	Residence	March 8, 2004
Brad Darbyson	Ottawa	
Terry Kilrea	Nepean	
Alan Riddell	Ottawa	X

New Democratic Party
Candidate	Residence	April 14, 2004
Jeannie Page	Ottawa	
Monia Mazigh	Nepean	X

=== 2000 ===
By 2000, Manley had progressed to Minister of Foreign Affairs. He defeated Brad Darbyson, the Canadian Alliance candidate, who was an investment counsellor. Finishing in third was engineer Kevin Lister, the Progressive Conservative candidate and native Albertan.

2000 Canadian federal election
Party	Candidate	Votes	%	±%	Expenditures
Liberal	John Manley	26,585	51.3	-7.7	$51,901
Alliance	Brad Darbyson	12,677	24.5	+8.6	$40,183
Progressive Conservative	Kevin Lister	8,096	15.6	+0.4	$23,923
New Democratic	Jeannie Page	3,463	6.7	-1.5	$11,522
Marijuana	Ron Whalen	679	1.3	n/a	
Natural Law	James Hea	141	0.3	0.0	
Marxist–Leninist	Marsha Fine	80	0.2	-0.1	
Communist	Mick Panesar	69	0.1	n/a	$246
Difference		13,908	26.9	-16.3	
Rejected Ballots		231	0.4	-0.3	
Turnout		52,021	62.0	-10.3	
Liberal hold		Swing	-8.2	-3.8	

^ Canadian Alliance change compares to the vote total for the Reform Party candidate in 1997.

=== 1997 ===
Before the 1997 election, the riding changed its boundaries slightly. The old 1987 version encompassed 95% of the new 1996 version. The remaining 5% came from nearby Carleton-Gloucester. John Manley, now the Minister of Industry was once again re-elected. He faced opposition from the Somali community in the riding for his indifference to their needs and concerns. This did not have enough impact, however, and Manley won again with another massive majority. He defeated Carla Marie Dancey, the Reform Party candidate who lived outside the riding. Also running was Keith Beardsley, a staffer to MP Gerry Weiner. Many attribute Manley's victory to attracting business to Ottawa's high tech sector.

1997 Canadian federal election
Party	Candidate	Votes	%	±%	Expenditures
Liberal	John Manley	31,725	59.01	-7.19	$50,315
Reform	Carla Marie Dancey	8,522	15.85	+1.38	$24,092
Progressive Conservative	Keith Beardsley	8,115	15.09	+2.77	$23,773
New Democratic	Marcella Munro	4,374	8.14	+4.25	$23,462
Green	Maria Von Fickenstein	440	0.82		$0
Canadian Action	Paula Williams	281	0.52	n/a	$1,364
Natural Law	Richard Michael Wolfson	167	0.31		$0
Marxist–Leninist	Anna di Carlo	140	0.26		$0
Difference		23,203	43.2	-8.7	
Rejected Ballots		382	0.7		
Turnout		54,146	72.3		
Liberal hold		Swing	-4.29		

=== 1993 ===
1993 federal election redistributed results
Party	Vote	%
Liberal	37,500	66.20
Reform	8,197	14.47
Progressive Conservative	6,979	12.32
New Democratic	2,202	3.89
Others	1,768	3.12

Manley was re-elected, as part of a landslide victory for the opposition Liberals. He defeated consulting engineer Doug Walkinshaw of the Reform Party. Joe Anton, the Progressive Conservative candidate, an auditor for Revenue Canada defeated the former mayor of Kanata for the Tory nomination. Ursule Critoph, an economist, was the NDP candidate.

1993 Canadian federal election
Party	Candidate	Votes	%	±%	Expenditures
Liberal	John Manley	36,485	65.93	+15.10	$116,684
Reform	Doug Walkinshaw	8,003	14.46	n/a	$46,281
Progressive Conservative	Joe Anton	6,971	12.60	-22.46	$18,730
New Democratic	Ursule Critoph	2,169	3.92	-9.62	$39,876
National	George Shirreff	1,038	1.88	n/a	
Green	Joe Palmer	358	0.65	n/a	
Natural Law	Ronald J.D. Parker	251	0.45	n/a	
Marxist–Leninist	Louise Waldman	63	0.11	n/a	
Valid votes		55,338	100.0		
Liberal hold		Swing	+0.32		

=== 1988 ===
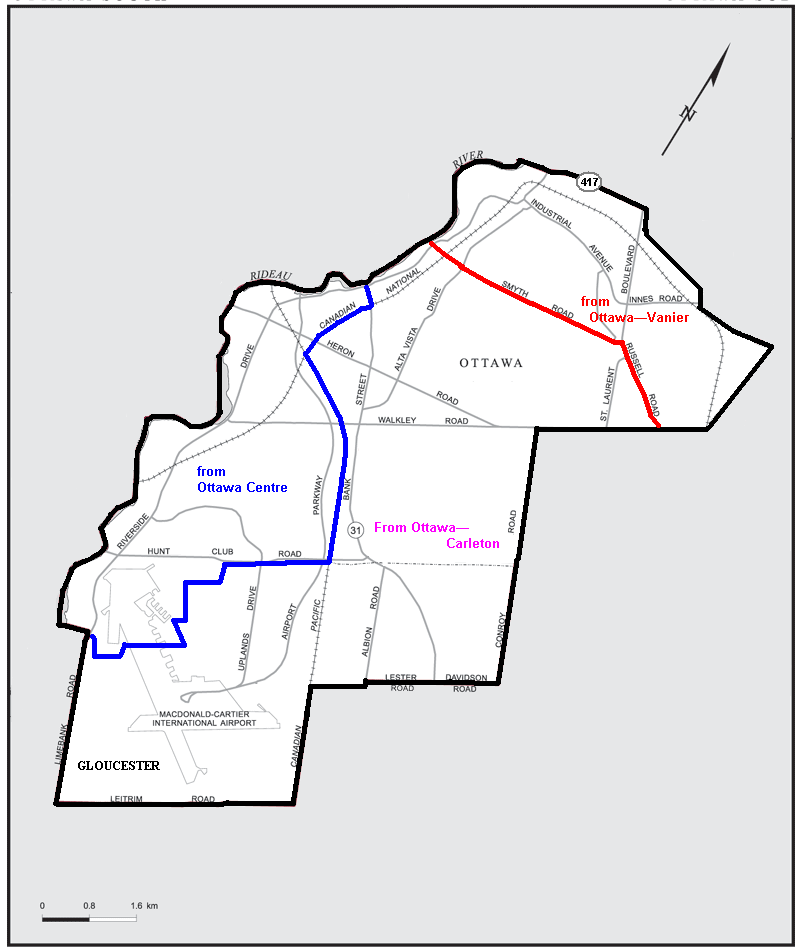
Ottawa South in 1987 showing the districts from which it was created.

Barry Turner was the Progressive Conservative incumbent MP going into the 1988 election. He had previously been the MP for the Ottawa—Carleton riding. As an MP, Turner had a reputation as a hard working MP. However, he would end up being defeated by John Manley, a lawyer with a specialty in tax law. Many attribute the loss to a phone and mail campaign by the Public Service Alliance of Canada, which was upset at the Progressive Conservative Government's cuts to the civil service.

1988 Canadian federal election: Ottawa South
Party	Candidate	Votes	%	±%	Expenditures
Liberal	John Manley	27,740	50.83	+14.17	$60,329
Progressive Conservative	Barry Turner	19,134	35.06	-10.04	$43,380
New Democratic	John Fryer	7,392	13.54	-3.26	$42,207
Libertarian	Marc A. Shindler	146	0.27	–	
Commonwealth of Canada	Jack C. Chambers	90	0.16	–	
Independent	Charles Boylan	74	0.14	–	
Difference		8,606	15.8		
Valid votes		54,576			
Liberal notional gain from Progressive Conservative		Swing		+12.11	

^ Change based on redistributed results.

==== Opinion polls ====
Polling Firm	Link	LPC	PC	NDP
CJOH-Optima		44	27	13

=== 1984 (transposed) ===
1984 federal election redistributed results
Party	Vote	%
Progressive Conservative	22,490	45.10
Liberal	18,280	36.66
New Democratic	8,381	16.81
Others	717	1.44

== See also ==
- List of Canadian electoral districts
- Historical federal electoral districts of Canada
