= Hillcrest High School (Ottawa) =

Location
- 1900 Dauphin Road; Ottawa, Ontario, K1G 2L7; Canada; 45°23′55″N 75°38′22″W

Information
- Founded: 1961
- School board: Ottawa Carleton District School Board
- Superintendent: Reg Lavergne
- Area trustee: Nili Kaplan-Myrth
- Administrator: Joanne Tanner
- Principal: Dinu Chande
- Staff: 50 (2022)
- Grades: 9-12
- Enrollment: 493 (2022)
- Campus type: Suburban
- Colours: Blue, red and gold
- Mascot: Hawk
- Team name: Hawks
- Website: hillcresths.ocdsb.ca

Hillcrest High School is an Ottawa-Carleton District School Board high school in the Elmvale Acres neighbourhood of Ottawa, Ontario, Canada. The school was opened in 1961. Its sports teams are nicknamed "The Hawks". Its exclusive catchment area covers the neighbourhoods of Riverview, Faircrest Heights, Playfair Park, Elmvale Acres, Urbandale, Hawthorne Meadows, Sheffield Glen, Hunt Club Park and part of Greenboro.

Hillcrest High School is an ethnically diverse school. The surrounding area includes significant Black, Arab, Indian, and Somali communities, among others. Hillcrest also offers a full-immersion French program.

== Sports ==
Hillcrest has a long history of success in sports. The school has won numerous boys' rugby, basketball and hockey championships. The senior boys' rugby team was considered the top in the city, years 2006–08. The junior basketball team was considered the top in the city in the year 2008–09. Hillcrest's varsity girls' hockey team claimed the tier 2 championship, two years in a row 08-09 and 09–10. Also notable is their track team's long history of success at the city and provincial levels. In the past, players on the Ottawa 67's attended Hillcrest during the season (prior to changes to the cross-boundary transfer process).

== Allegations ==
In June 2022, a petition was circulated to remove the principal over allegations of racism. The Principal and other teaching staff were alleged to have singled-out Black and Arab students for discipline, including monitoring washrooms for vaping, subjecting them to searches, and following procedures set by the board for mandatory police contact. The Ottawa-Carleton District School Board have stated that an investigation into these allegations is ongoing.

== Notable alumni ==
- David Azzi (football player)
- Belly (rapper)
- Nick Boynton (hockey player)
- Barry Brown (musician)
- Sophie Buddle (comedian)
- Al Charron (rugby player)
- Trent Correy (film director, screenwriter, animator)
- Logan Couture (hockey player)
- Chris Gardner (curler)
- Stewart Gavin (hockey player)
- Derek Joslin (hockey player)
- Corey Locke (hockey player)
- Mark Mancari (hockey player)
- Massari (singer)
- Grant Marshall (hockey player)
- Jamie McGinn (hockey player)
- Terry McGurrin (comedian, actor, writer)
- Bryan McSheffrey (hockey player)
- Sean Monahan (hockey player)
- Mike Murphy (football player)
- Dale Potter (football player)
- Glenda Reiser (runner)
- Ken Rockburn (journalist)
- Tom Schultz (football player)
- Tyler Toffoli (hockey player)
- Michael Woods (cyclist)

== See also ==
- Education in Ontario
- List of secondary schools in Ontario
- List of Ottawa schools
