= Diane Deans =

Canadian politician (1958–2024)

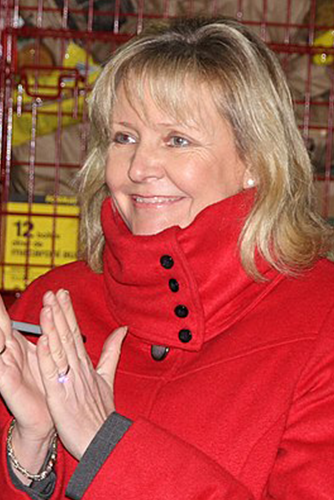
- Diane Deans in 2012

Ottawa City Councillor
- In office December 1, 1994 – November 15, 2022
- Preceded by: Joan O'Neill
- Succeeded by: Jessica Bradley
- Constituency: Gloucester-Southgate Ward (2001–2022); Southgate Ward (1994–2000)

Personal details
- Born: Diane Elizabeth Flaherty; September 16, 1958 Caledon, Ontario, Canada
- Died: May 14, 2024 (aged 65)
- Party: New Democratic Party; Liberal
- Spouse(s): Ron Richards; Ian Deans (div.)
- Children: 1

Diane Elizabeth Deans (née Flaherty; September 16, 1958 – May 14, 2024) was a Canadian politician. A member of Ottawa City Council, she represented Gloucester-Southgate Ward, and its predecessor Southgate Ward in the city's southeast from 1994 to 2022. She was known for her demanding of public accountability and transparency on city-wide issues.

== Early life ==
Deans was born in Caledon, Ontario, the daughter of Paul and Mary Rosanne Flaherty on September 16, 1958, and grew up in Caledon. A graduate of the University of Guelph, she worked for the National Union of Students as the prairie fieldworker, before its merger with the Canadian Federation of Students. In 1981, she moved to Ottawa and became the executive director of the Canadian Federation of Students, and then became a staffer on Parliament Hill, working as a researcher and media advisor. In 1990, she became a homemaker.

== Career ==
Deans announced in July 1994 that she was going to run for Ottawa City Council in the 1994 Ottawa municipal election in Ward 3 (later named Southgate Ward), in the city's south end. At the time she was the vice-chair of the Ottawa Board of Education Lighthouse program, and represented Hunt Club Park on the Southeast Ottawa Environmental Association traffic study. In her announcement, she stated "safety, transportation and fiscal responsibility" were her main issues. The ward's incumbent, Joan O'Neill was not running again, as she had sought the mayoralty. The campaign featured a controversy when a would-be opponent registered their candidacy under the similarly named "Dana Dean". Dana Dean was not the individual's real name, and Deans accused a different opponent for orchestrating the stunt in order to split the vote. "Dana Dean" decided to not run in the election. On election day, Deans won her race, defeating her nearest rival, Gale McAuley by over 1,100 votes. Following her win, she was expected to be among the left wing on council. After taking her seat, she was appointed to the city's community services and operations committee. She later became the chair of the committee.

On her first term on council, Deans established a local safety council, a business parks association, and a library advocacy committee. She ran for re-election in the 1997 Ottawa municipal election running on a platform of "streamlining local government", building a library in the south end, focusing of community safety issues, maintaining essential services, and the preservation of public green spaces. She was ultimately re-elected without opposition.

Prior to Ottawa and its surrounding municipalities being amalgamated in 2001, the 2000 municipal elections were fought to elect the council for the new expanded city. Deans' Southgate Ward would see the addition of part of the City of Gloucester added to it, becoming Gloucester-Southgate Ward. The incumbent for that part of Gloucester on its city council was George Barrett, who ran against Deans in the new ward. Deans was most concerned about the city's debt during the election, and also supported a greater police presence in the ward. What set her apart from the other candidates was her continued support for the construction of a library in the ward. Deans went on to beat Barrett by over 2000 votes.

In the 2003 Ottawa election, she defeated former Gloucester city councillor Harold Keenan by over 2000 votes. Deans declared her victory as a "mandate to continue to push for better services in the south end of Ottawa". This included a new library and a stronger police presence in the area. Keenan had opposed building a library in the city's south end.

Deans sought the federal Liberal nomination in the riding of Ottawa South ahead of the 2004 Canadian federal election, but lost to David McGuinty, the brother of Ontario's then-Premier, Dalton McGuinty. At a city council meeting, Deans was caught on CBC camera working on a campaign speech for the nomination. As a result, city staffed banned television cameras from being behind the council table. Her decision to run was also controversial, as mayor Bob Chiarelli thought she should resign her council seat first.

Long one of Deans' main concerns had been the creation of a new branch for the Ottawa Public Library in her rapidly growing ward. In 2006, the Greenboro District Library was finally opened.

Deans was seen as a possible candidate to challenge Chiarelli for the mayoralty in the 2006 Ottawa election, but chose to run for re-election in Gloucester-Southgate Ward. On election day, Deans was easily re-elected, winning her fifth term as a city councillor, defeating social worker Douglas Besharah and Carleton University student David Alloggia by over 7,500 votes. She indicated the most important issues in the election for her ward was community safety, keeping taxes as low as possible and providing necessary services. One of the main issues of the campaign was the extension of Ottawa's north–south light rail line, which Deans supported, but her opponents called a "folly". Deans cited the construction of the Greenboro Library as one of her accomplishments during the previous term.

In March 2007, Diane Deans announced that she had been approached by members of the Ontario Liberal Party urging her to seek the party's nomination for the riding of Ottawa Centre in that year's provincial election. She received the support of the outgoing MPP Richard Patten. On June 4, 2007, she lost the provincial nomination to Yasir Naqvi.

Deans won a sixth term of office in the 2010 election She defeated former project manager Lilly Obina by nearly 2000 votes. Following the election, Deans stated her priorities were to ensure property taxes were kept low for homeowners. One of the main issues of the campaign was the construction of a women's shelter in the ward, which many residents opposed. Deans had been criticized for "failing to properly interpret city zoning and site bylaws" in regards to its construction.

After living there for 15 years, Deans had to move away from the ward due to "a family health situation" prior to the 2014 Ottawa municipal election. Despite this, she ran for re-election, but was criticized by her rivals for the move. Crime and safety was one of the main issues of the election, though Deans insisted that the ward was a "very safe community". Deans was challenged again by Obina, but this time beat her by nearly 4,000 votes, and won her seventh consecutive term, as a result.

Deans was the chairperson of the city's Community and Protective Services Committee of the City of Ottawa, until becoming the first woman to lead the city's Police Services Board in 2018. She also sat on the Transportation Committee, the Finance and Economic Development Committee, Member Services Committee, and the Ottawa Community Lands Development Corporation. She was co-chair of the Seniors' Roundtable.

Deans ran again in the 2018 election for her final term. Her main opponent was businessman Robert Swaita, owner of KS on the Keys restaurant. Once again crime was a major issue in the campaign. During the campaign, Deans' main priority was community safety, and supported reinstating the community policing model. On election day, she won 56 per cent of the vote to Swaita's 31 per cent.

Deans was often a critic of mayor Jim Watson during his tenure as mayor from 2010 to 2022, and criticized the secrecy behind the construction of the Confederation Line light rail project. City council removed her as head of the Police Services Board in 2022 when she and the board hired Matt Torigian to replace Peter Sloly during the infamous Canada convoy protest without informing the mayor or council. She never got over her ousting, which she considered a betrayal.

Deans had planned to run for mayor in the 2022 Ottawa municipal election, but opted to retire from politics instead. Her assistant, Jessica Bradley ran in her seat, and won.

On council, Deans was seen as being left-of-centre.

== Personal life and death ==
Deans was married to former New Democratic Party Member of Parliament Ian Deans for 22 years.

In September 2019, Deans was diagnosed with ovarian cancer. She had entered palliative care by early May 2024, and died on May 14, at the age of 65.

Following her death, city council voted to rename the Greenboro Community Centre after her.
