= Gloucester-Southgate Ward =

Gloucester-Southgate
- Location within Ottawa
- Coordinates: 45°21′N 75°37′W
- Country: Canada
- Province: Ontario
- City: Ottawa

Government
  - Councillor: Jessica Bradley

Population (2016)Canada 2016 Census
  - Total: 47,165

Languages (2016)
  - English: 53.4%
  - Arabic: 14.0%
  - French: 11.9%
  - Somali: 2.4%
  - Spanish: 2.0%
  - Mandarin: 1.6%
  - Cantonese: 1.4%
  - Italian: 1.4%
  - Tagalog: 1.0%

Gloucester-Southgate Ward (Ward 10) is a city ward located in Ottawa, Ontario. Located in the city's south end, the ward includes Gloucester Glen east of the Rideau River, most of the Ottawa International Airport, CFSU Uplands, Blossom Park, Greenboro, Hunt Club Park, portions of Heron Gate south of Walkley Road, the Ottawa South/Hawthorne Industrial Park and rural areas west of Anderson Road and north of Leitrim. Previously, the ward included the community of Riverside South located south of the airport but in a ward reorganization, the growing community was included in the new ward of Gloucester-South Nepean.

Prior to amalgamation, this area was covered by Southgate Ward on Ottawa City Council and Gloucester South Ward on Gloucester City Council. Southgate Ward was known as Billings Ward from 1980 to 1994, and Gloucester Ward prior to that. The ward was created in 1950, when the area was annexed from Gloucester Township. From 1952 to 1956 it was part of Ward 1.

== City councillors ==
=== Ottawa City Council ===
Prior to 1950, the area was part of Gloucester Township. Township council was elected on an at-large basis, meaning no wards existed.

- Alex Roger (1950)
- Archibald Newman (1950-1952)
- Pat Doherty (1951-1952)

Ward merged with Rideau Ward to become Ward 1 from 1952-1956

- Pat Doherty (1957-1958)
- Alex Roger (1957-1960)
- Murray Heit (1957-1964)
- Pat Doherty (1961-1962)
- Don Kay (1963-1966)
- Pat Doherty (1965-1966)
- Jim Knubley (1967-1969)
- Joe Quinn (1967-1980)
- Pat Doherty (1970-1972)
- Brian Bourns (1980-1985)
- Joan O'Neill (1985-1994)
- Diane Deans (1994–2022)
- Jessica Bradley (2022–present)

=== Gloucester City Council ===
Gloucester adopted a ward system in 1985. Gloucester South was represented by two city councillors until 1991.

- Claudette Cain (1985-1991)
- Harold Keenan (1985-1988)
- Mitch Owens (1988-1991)
- Daniel Beamish (1991-1994)
- George Barrett (1994-2000)

== Election results ==
=== 2026 Ottawa municipal election ===
2026 Ottawa municipal election: Gloucester-Southgate
Candidate	Popular vote			Expenditures
Candidate	Votes	%	±%	Expenditures
Jessica Bradley (X)	7,506	69.31		
Donna Dickson	1,480	13.67		
Ahmed Rashid	1,187	10.96		
John Redins	367	3.39		
Ayub Omar	290	2.68		
Total valid votes	11,122			
Total rejected, unmarked and declined votes				
Turnout		28.49		
Eligible voters	39,036			
Note: Candidate campaign colours are based on the prominent colour used in campaign items (signs, literature, etc.) and are used as a visual differentiation between candidates.

=== 2022 Ottawa municipal election ===
City council
Candidate	Vote	%
Jessica Bradley	4,927	42.24
Hussein Mahmoud	2,809	24.08
Taylor Houstoun	2,557	21.92
Aria Alavi	716	6.14
John Redins	333	2.85
Ron Keays	323	2.77

=== 2018 Ottawa municipal election ===
City council
Candidate	Vote	%
Diane Deans	6,179	56.08
Robert Swaita	3,435	31.17
Alek Golijanin	875	7.94
Sam Soucy	342	3.10
Perry Sabourin	188	1.71

=== 2014 Ottawa municipal election ===
City council
Candidate	Vote	%
Diane Deans	6,251	56.27
Lilly Obina	2,397	21.58
Brad Pye	963	8.67
Rodaina Chahrour	952	8.57
Mohamed Roble	401	3.61
George Marko	102	0.92
Meladul Haq Ahmadzai	43	0.39

Ottawa mayor (Ward results)
Candidate	Vote	%
Jim Watson	8,259	76.47
Mike Maguire	1,742	16.13
Anwar Syed	406	3.76
Rebecca Pyrah	108	1.00
Robert White	106	0.98
Michael St. Arnaud	73	0.68
Darren W. Wood	62	0.57
Bernard Couchman	44	0.41

=== 2010 Ottawa municipal election ===
City council
Candidate	Votes	%
Diane Deans	5774	48.48
Lilly Obina	3864	32.44
Wade Wallace	1938	16.27
Leslie Saintilma	334	2.80

=== 2006 Ottawa municipal election ===
City council
Candidate	Votes	%
Diane Deans	9242	74.73
Douglas Besharah	1660	13.42
David Allogia	1465	11.85

=== 2003 Ottawa municipal election ===
City council
Candidate	Votes	%
Diane Deans	6166	59.34
Harold Keenan	3917	37.70
David Lamothe	308	2.96

=== 2000 Ottawa municipal election ===
Following amalgamation, Ottawa City Councillor Diane Deans defeated Gloucester City councillor George Barrett.

City council
Candidate	Votes	%
Diane Deans	6,724	48.62
George Barrett	4,599	33.25
Bob Leedy	2,274	16.44
Anoop Rangi	234	1.69

=== 1997 Ottawa-Carleton Regional Municipality elections ===
Regional council: Gloucester-Southgate
Candidate	Votes	%
Dan Beamish	5,169	65.18
Joan O'Neill	2,761	34.82

Ottawa City Council: Southgate Ward
Candidate	Votes	%
Diane Deans	Acclaimed	

Gloucester City Council: Gloucester South
Candidate	Votes	%
George Barrett	Acclaimed	

=== 1994 Ottawa-Carleton Regional Municipality elections ===
Regional council: Ward 10
Candidate	Votes	%
Dan Beamish	6,091	60.84
James McMahon	1,484	14.82
Moe Royer	1,394	13.92
Kenneth McCarthy	1,042	10.41

Ottawa City Council: Ward 3
Candidate	Votes	%
Diane Deans	2,830	46.69
Gale McAuley	1,708	28.18
Wayne MacKinnon	818	13.50
Khal Ishraki	637	10.51
Tony Tiefenbach	68	1.12

Gloucester City Council: Gloucester South
Candidate	Votes	%
George Barrett	3,015	70.33
George Saade	873	20.36
Brent P. Colbert	399	9.31

=== 1950 special election ===
Upon annexation by Ottawa, Gloucester Ward held a special election January 2, 1950. Two aldermen were elected.

City council
Candidate	Votes	%
Alex Roger	1,404	34.29
Archibald Newman	901	22.00
George C. Lyon	571	13.94
E. M. Fillman	355	8.67
J. C. S. Wolf	317	7.74
Michael Lackner	284	6.94
W. G. Lewis	263	6.42
