= Blossom Park =

- Neighbourhood
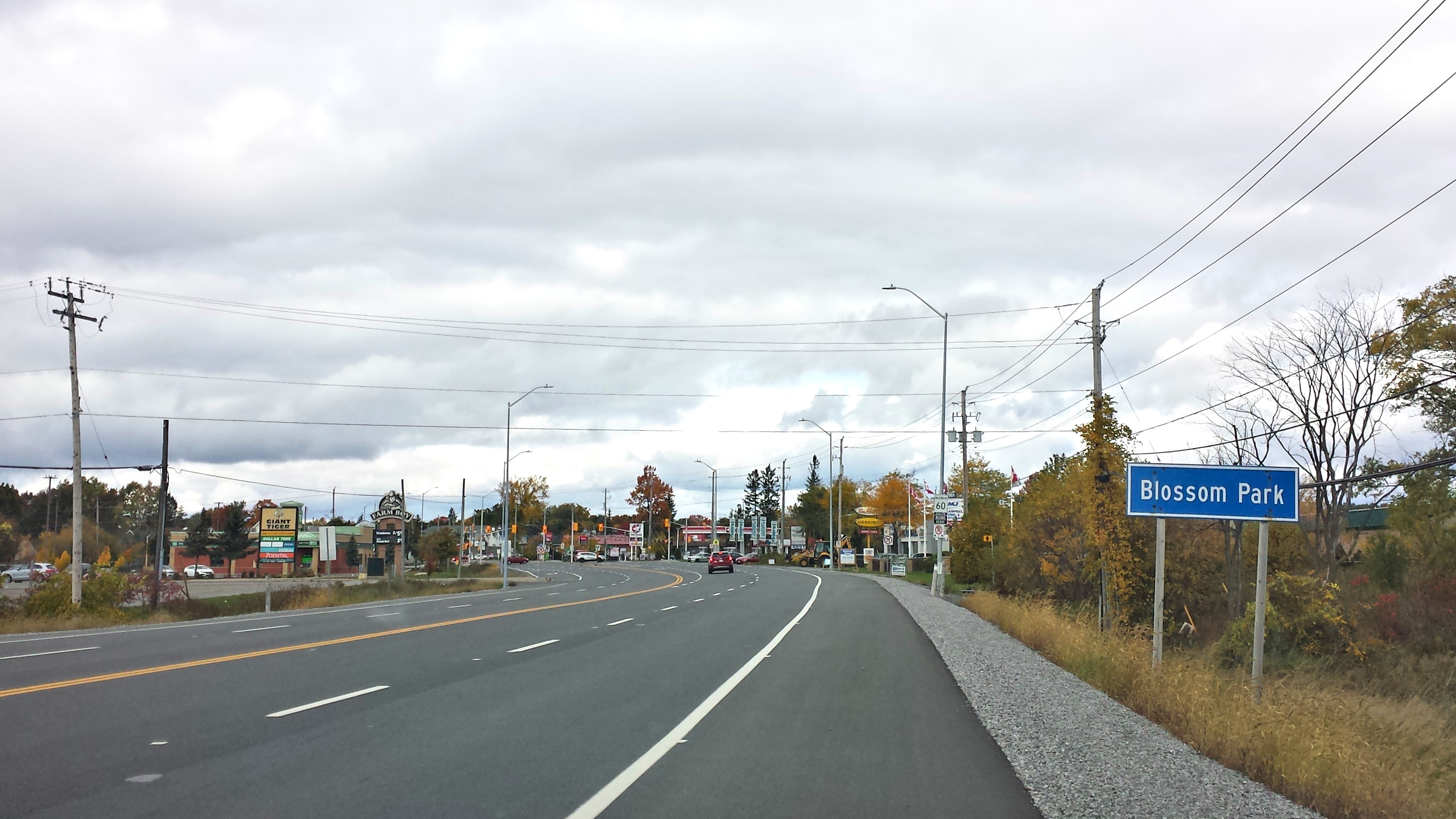

- Location within Ottawa
- Coordinates: 45.3442745°N 75.63752°W
- Country: Canada
- Province: Ontario
- City: Ottawa

Government
  - MP: David McGuinty
  - MPP: John Fraser
  - Councillors: Jessica Bradley

Area
  - Total: 6.193 km^{2} (2.391 sq mi)
- Elevation: 90 m (300 ft)

Population (2016)
  - Total: 14,190
  - Density: 2,291.297/km^{2} (5,934.43/sq mi)
- Canada 2016 Census
- Time zone: UTC−5 (Eastern (EST))
  - Summer (DST): UTC−4 (EDT)
- Forward sortation area: K1T

Blossom Park is a neighbourhood in Gloucester-Southgate Ward in the south-end of the city of Ottawa, Ontario, Canada. Before the 2001 city of Ottawa amalgamation it was a suburb of the city of Gloucester. The current limits of the neighbourhood are: Hunt Club Road to the north, Airport Parkway to the west, Conroy Road to the east and the Greenbelt to the south (near Lester Road).

According to the Canada 2016 Census, the population of the neighbourhood was 14,190.

== History ==
The area was cleared and farmed by settlers who began to arrive in the early decades of the 19th century. Early settlers included Charles Kinmond, a native of Perthshire, Scotland, James Spratt, Leonard Wood (1805–1888) and his wife Martha (1821–1905) and John Halpenny (1818–1873) who hailed from Wicklow, Ireland. Their farms were accessed by the Prescott Road, which was established on its present course in 1844, was later known as the Metcalfe Road and subsequently became part of Highway 31. It is now the southern portion of Bank Street and remains the major north-south thoroughfare through the community.

The first known reference to "Blossom Park" appeared in a subdivision plan which was drafted by the Bytown Suburb and Land Company for the north half of Lot 9, in the 4th Concession, Rideau Front of the Township of Gloucester which was approved by the township council on November 6, 1911 and subsequently filed at the Carleton County land registry office in Ottawa. A street grid was established but little development took place and the area remained essentially rural through the first half of the 20th century. It was transformed into a suburban community with the construction of bungalows on 150 x 100 foot lots along Central Boulevard (now Kingsdale Avenue) and Rosebella Avenue and on the north side of Lawrence Avenue (now Queensdale) between Albion and Conroy Roads in the 1950s. Lots on the south side of Queensdale between the future site of the Sawmill Creek Housing Co-op (built 1983-84) and Conroy were sold piecemeal for residential development beginning in 1960.

Lots fronting on the east side of Highway 31 were severed by farmer John W. Goth (1878-1959) and sold piecemeal for residential development beginning in 1947.

Saint Bernard Roman Catholic Parish was established in 1957. Saint Bernard School had opened its doors in 1955 followed by the adjacent Blossom Park Public School in 1956 and later Sainte Bernadette: a French-language Roman Catholic school on the east side of Sixth Street which opened in 1965. The Kmart Plaza (now the Blossom Park Plaza) opened in 1970. Transit service was extended to the community by the Ottawa Transportation Commission (now OC Transpo) in 1972. The Quail Ridge subdivision was constructed in the late 1970s followed by Bernard Court (which was built in the early 1980s) and the Victoria Heights neighbourhood which was constructed in the late 1980s.

Wood's Cemetery, on a hill on the west side of Bank Street was formally established in 1881, but the site had actually been used by settlers as a burial ground from the 1850s or earlier, the oldest marked grave being that of Charles Kinmond who died December 19, 1859. The adjacent Jewish Cemetery, now known as the Jewish Memorial Gardens, dates back to 1892, when leaders of the Adath Jeshurun Synagogue established a burial ground for the Ottawa-area Jewish Community.

The Gloucester Presbyterian Church, which was built in 1928 and stood on the west side of Highway 31 near Sieveright Road was demolished in 1990.

The Aladdin Drive-In on Albion Road was a major local attraction from 1951 until its closure in 1993.

Blossom Park residents welcomed Queen Elizabeth II and Prince Philip when their motorcade passed through the community during the royal tour commemorating the centennial of Confederation in 1967. Former Prime Minister John Diefenbaker visited Blossom Park Public School in 1971. Ski Jumper Horst Bulau who competed on the World Cup circuit and represented Canada at four Olympics grew up in the neighbourhood and attended Blossom Park Public School.

Blossom Park reached a major milestone on the road from rural to suburban with the opening of the Kmart Plaza (now Blossom Park Plaza) on the site of a former cow pasture on the southwest corner of Highway 31 (Bank Street) and Queensdale Avenue in August 1970. Chow's restaurant opened in the early 1980s and closed in the mid-1990s. Chow's was the scene of Blossom Park's first known murder when 34-year-old mother of two Anne Frances Yeo was shot and killed in the parking lot by her estranged boyfriend on May 18, 1985. The former Steer Burger/Chow's was demolished in 2007.

Many of the early settlers in the area were British and Irish immigrants and the population of the community remained of predominantly British and Irish origin through the 1950s. This began to change with the arrival of immigrants from central Europe and the Mediterranean region, particularly Italy, in the 1960s. In more recent decades the community has welcomed people of Caribbean and African origin and has grown more diverse.

The north-south light-rail line project (which was cancelled in 2006) was planned to pass on the western edge of the area when the expansion would have been completed in 2009. Natives disputed ownership of a parcel of land with the city of Ottawa that was to be used by the LRT line.

== Sub-neighbourhoods ==
The Gloucester Historical Society Gloucester Place Name Project has identified several places within Blossom Park:

- Aladdin Village
- Deerfield Village
- Emerald Woods
- Gates of Albion
- Quail Ridge
- Sawmill Creek Estates
- Victoria Heights

== Demographics ==
Historical census populations – Blossom Park

Year	Pop.	±%
1956	988	—
1961	2,022	+104.7%
1966	2,265	+12.0%
1971	2,175	−4.0%
1976	2,680	+23.2%

Year	Pop.	±%
1981	5,805	+116.6%
1986	8,660	+49.2%
1991	10,555	+21.9%
1996	11,031	+4.5%
2001	12,329	+11.8%

Year	Pop.	±%
2006	12,361	+0.3%
2011	14,060	+13.7%
2016	14,190	+0.9%
2021	14,621	+3.0%
