= St. Francis Xavier Catholic High School (Clarence-Rockland) =

Catholic school in Ontario, Canada

Coordinates: 45.42151°N 75.20954°W

Information
- Established: 1993; 33 years ago
- Enrollment: c.450
- Mascot: Falcons
- Website: stfx-hammond.cdsbeo.on.ca

St. Francis Xavier Catholic High School is an English-medium Catholic high school that serves the Clarence-Rockland community in Eastern Ontario. It is located at 1235 Russell Road, southeast of the village of Hammond.

The school's mascot is the Falcons. It is home to 450 students across the Prescott-Russell County. The school opened in 1993. Check out the Virtual Tour.

== See also ==
- Catholic District School Board of Eastern Ontario
- St. Francis Xavier CHS Website
