= Barry Turner (politician) =

Canadian politician (1946–2021)

J. Barry Turner

Member of the Canadian Parliament for Ottawa—Carleton
- In office 1984–1988
- Preceded by: Jean-Luc Pépin
- Succeeded by: District abolished

Personal details
- Born: April 11, 1946 Ottawa, Ontario, Canada
- Died: October 20, 2021 (aged 75) Ottawa, Ontario, Canada
- Party: Progressive Conservative

John Barry Turner (April 11, 1946 – October 20, 2021) was a Canadian politician and lobbyist.

Born in Ottawa, Ontario, Turner was elected to the House of Commons of Canada in Brian Mulroney's massive sweep in the 1984 election in which the Progressive Conservative Party of Canada won more seats than any party before or since.

Turner was elected to the riding of Ottawa—Carleton, which has been a traditional Liberal seat, and was once the riding of then Prime Minister John Turner (no relation), who left parliament in 1976 and was seeking election in Vancouver, British Columbia. Turner was defeated in his bid for re-election in 1988 by future Deputy Prime Minister John Manley in the new riding of Ottawa South.

Barry Turner has been a lobbyist for Ducks Unlimited in recent years. He was briefly nominated as a candidate for the Conservative Party of Canada for the 2006 Canadian federal election but decided not to stand. He died on October 20, 2021, from cancer.

== Electoral results ==
1984 Canadian federal election: Ottawa—Carleton
| Party | Candidate | Votes |
|---|---|---|
| Progressive Conservative | Barry Turner | 34,693 |
| Liberal | Albert J. Roy | 30,747 |
| New Democratic | Vernon Lang | 10,760 |
| Rhinoceros | J.C. Reverent Hicks | 648 |
| Green | John W. Dodson | 341 |
| Independent | Mireille Landry-Kennedy | 281 |
| Commonwealth of Canada | Sylvain Labelle | 69 |

1988 Canadian federal election: Ottawa South
| Party | Candidate | Votes | % | ±% | Expenditures |
|---|---|---|---|---|---|
| Liberal | John Manley | 27,740 | 50.83 | +14.17 | $60,329 |
| Progressive Conservative | Barry Turner | 19,134 | 35.06 | -10.04 | $43,380 |
| New Democratic | John Fryer | 7,392 | 13.54 | -3.26 | $42,207 |
| Libertarian | Marc A. Shindler | 146 | 0.27 | – | |
| Commonwealth of Canada | Jack C. Chambers | 90 | 0.16 | – | |
| Independent | Charles Boylan | 74 | 0.14 | – | |
| Difference | | 8,606 | 15.8 | | |
| Valid votes | | 54,576 | | | |
| Liberal notional gain from Progressive Conservative | | Swing | | +12.11 | |

== Notes ==
- Barry Turner – Parliament of Canada biography
