= Monia Mazigh =

Canadian author and academic (born 1970)

- منية مازيغ
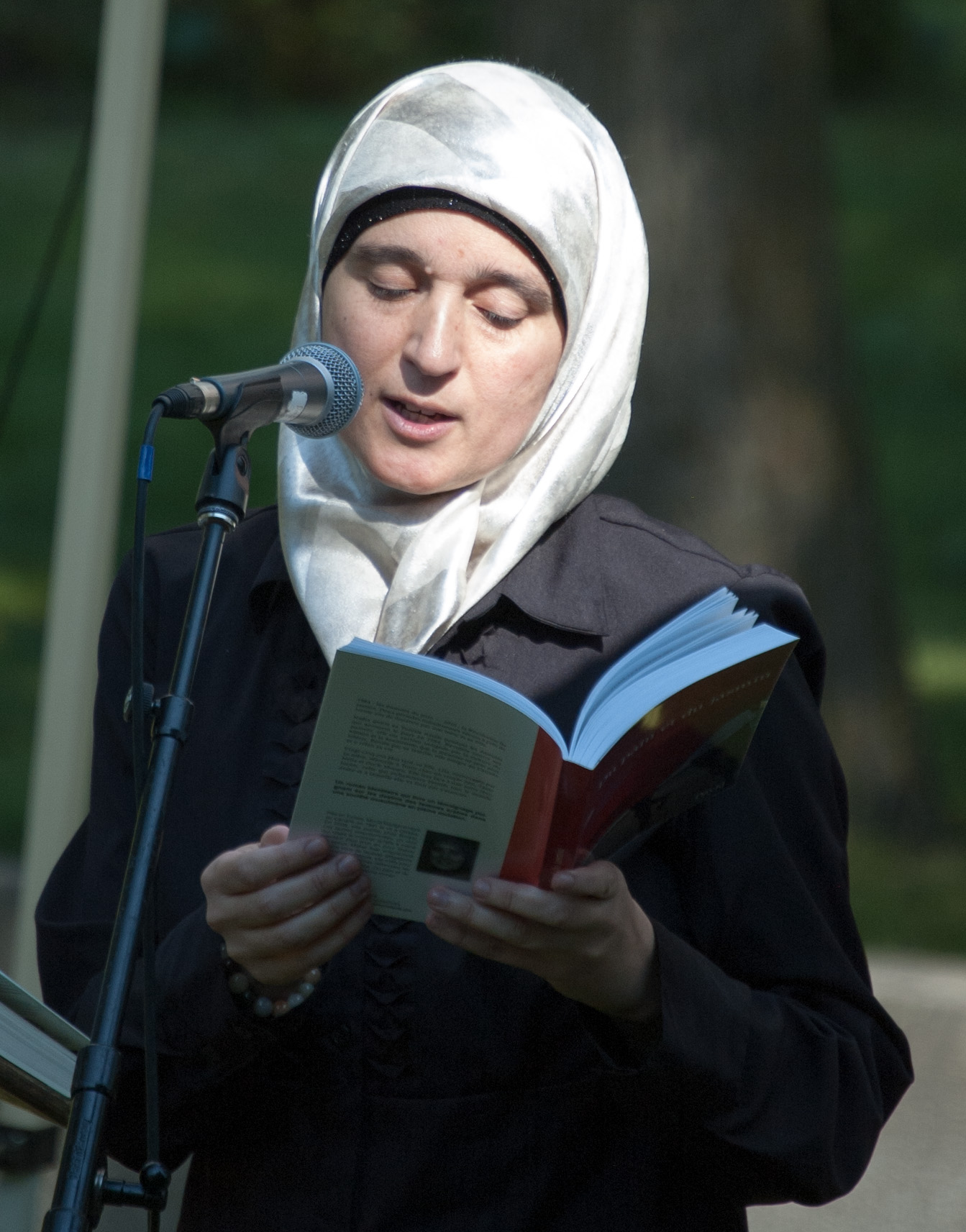
- Mazigh at the Eden Mills Writers' Festival in 2017
- Born: July 10, 1970 (age 56); Tunisia
- Education: McGill University
- Occupations: Author, academic
- Political party: New Democratic Party

Monia Mazigh (Arabic: منية مازيغ; born July 10, 1970) is a Tunisian - Canadian author and academic best known for her efforts to free her husband Maher Arar from a Syrian prison. A resident of Ottawa, Ontario, she was the New Democratic Party candidate for the riding of Ottawa South, a traditionally Liberal riding, in the 2004 federal election. In June 2015 she was appointed National Coordinator of the International Civil Liberties Monitoring Group.

== Early life and education ==
Mazigh was born and raised in Tunisia and emigrated to Canada in 1991, at the age of 21. She has a PhD in financial economics from McGill University and speaks Arabic, English and French fluently. In 2000, she started working for the University of Ottawa as a research assistant and later as a French-language instructor. She has stated that until 2002, her goal was to become a professor instead of a politician.

== The Maher Arar case and political activism ==
Mazigh first entered the public spotlight when her husband was deported to Syria in 2002 by the US government, on suspicion of terrorist links. He was tortured and held without charge for over a year before being returned to Canada. Mazigh joined with a number of human rights groups to press the government for his release. She appeared frequently in the media and was widely respected for her tireless efforts. Of her willingness to speak out, she has said that she was never afraid: "I had lost my life. I didn't have more to lose."

She was courted by the Liberal Party, but chose to stand as a candidate for the NDP. Mazigh had reportedly grown personally close with NDP foreign affairs critic, and former federal leader, Alexa McDonough, and she perceived the NDP as having been more emphatic than the other parties in calling for her husband's release. During a leaders' debate, NDP leader Jack Layton said that the party was proud to have her as a candidate. However, Mazigh's candidacy was unusual in that Mazigh personally does not support same-sex marriage; had she been elected she would have been the only NDP MP, alongside Desmond McGrath, NDP candidate in the riding of Random-Burin-St. George's in Newfoundland and Labrador, to oppose same-sex marriage by abstaining from a vote. While campaigning Mazigh said that she would abstain if Parliament was ever called to vote on the issue because of her reluctance to vote against a human rights issue. She also joined several individuals and groups in criticizing the NDP's more friendly attitude to Israel following the departure of Svend Robinson from the role of foreign affairs critic.

She ran against but lost to Liberal candidate David McGuinty, the brother of Ontario premier Dalton McGuinty. Despite finishing third, her 8,080 votes were the highest the NDP has ever won in Ottawa South federally or provincially until Henri Sader won 8,138 votes in 2006.

After running in the election, she worked for a while as a policy researcher at NDP headquarters in Ottawa. Some of her areas of expertise included economics (such as budget issues) and child care. She was employed as a professor of finance, at Thompson Rivers University in Kamloops, British Columbia for about one year until spring 2007. She currently resides in Ottawa.

In 2011, Mazigh endorsed the Canadian Boat to Gaza, part of the Freedom Flotilla 2 which aims to end the Israeli blockade imposed on the 1.6 million Palestinian civilians living in the Gaza Strip.

Her book Gendered Islamophobia: My Journey with a Scar(f) was shortlisted for the Governor General's Award for English-language non-fiction at the 2023 Governor General's Awards.

== Electoral record ==
2004 Canadian federal election
Party	Candidate	Votes	%	±%	Expenditures
Liberal	David McGuinty	25,956	43.82	-7.5	$74,148
Conservative	Alan Riddell	20,622	34.81	-5.3	$57,520
New Democratic	Monia Mazigh	8,080	13.64	+6.9	$73,230
Green	John Ford	3,398	5.73	n/a	$2,205
Marijuana	John Akpata	495	0.83	-0.5	
Progressive Canadian	Brad Thomson	375	0.63	n/a	$2,743
Independent	Raymond Aubin	225	0.37	n/a	$988
Marxist–Leninist	Saroj Bains	79	0.13	-0.1	
Difference		5,334	8.95	-17.9	
Rejected Ballots		361	0.61	+0.2	
Turnout		59,591	69.67	+7.7	
Liberal hold		Swing		+2.2	

== Bibliography ==
- Hope and Despair: My Struggle to Free My Husband, Maher Arar (2008)
- Mirrors and Mirages (2010)
- Hope Has Two Daughters (2017)
