= Russell Road (Ontario) =

Road in Eastern Ontario

Russell Road is an arterial road in Eastern Ontario, Canada. It begins in Ottawa in the Riverview neighbourhood and runs eastward through the rural communities of Ramsayville, Carlsbad Springs and Bearbrook in Ottawa and through the Municipality of Clarence-Rockland, connecting the communities of Cheney and Bourget, ending at Boundary Road on the eastern border of Clarence Rockland. In Ottawa it is officially Ottawa Road #26, and in Clarence-Rockland as United Counties of Prescott and Russell County Road #2.

== History ==
The road was originally built in the 1830s from parts of an indigenous trail that led to Montreal. In the 19th century, it was also known as the "Ottawa and Russell macadamized road". and was owned by the Ottawa and Russell Macadamized Road Company. It would later be owned by the Ottawa, Montreal & Russell Road Company. The Carleton County 1879 Atlas shows the road running from the village of Janeville (now Vanier), southward following the east bank of the Rideau River toward Hurdman's Bridge, then eastward following what is now Terminal Avenue, then turning south to connect more or less to its current alignment.

In about 1952, following the area's annexation into Ottawa, Russell Road from Janeville (at this time called Eastview) to Hurdman's Bridge would be renamed Riverside Drive (now River Road North). In 1960, the part of Russell Road from Hurdman's Bridge to the "westerly limit of the NCC subdivision" was renamed "Terminal Avenue". By the 1960s, the city of Ottawa deemed Russell Road as a "public highway", and plans were put in place to truncate the road to alleviate traffic. A by-law was passed in 1961 promising to close the road north of Industrial Avenue as soon as Industrial was extended to St. Laurent Boulevard. It was first truncated at Belfast Road in 1965, and then in 1979, it was temporarily truncated at Industrial, despite protestations from residents who used the road as a shortcut. This section was finally closed in 1980. The intersection of Russell Road with Smyth Road and St. Laurent Boulevard was realigned in 1976. Further east, following the completion of Highway 417 through Ramsayville in the mid-1970s, Russell Road was bifurcated by the highway. The bifurcation meant that Russell Road would be diverted to end at Baseline Road (now Ramsayville Road), south of the highway, and begin again north of the highway, with a bridge taking traffic under the new highway. Russell Road faced its final realignment in the mid-1990s when Hawthorne Road was extended north to the intersection of Russell and Walkley Road. The part of Russell Road south of Walkely was thus diverted to a new intersection with Hawthorne.

These intersection modifications have cut the road into 4 parts. To sum, Russell Road now begins at Industrial Avenue on the outskirts of the Riverview neighbourhood and runs southeast before ending at Smyth Road. The road begins again near the Elmvale Shopping Centre, from St. Laurent Boulevard, and runs south until it turns into Hawthorne Road. To keep going on Russell, one must make a left turn. This part of Russell Road continues to the community of Ramsayville, where the road then ends at Ramsayville Road. To keep going on Russell Road, one must take a left on Ramsayville Road, cross Highway 417 then turn right. At this point, Russell Road continues east through the communities of Carlsbad Springs, Bearbrook before leaving the city of Ottawa. It then passes through the communities of Cheney and Bourget in the City of Clarence-Rockland.

Russell Road was named because it was used by travellers, before the construction of Highway 417 as the route to get to Russell, Ontario from both Ottawa in the west and Bourget in the east. Russell Road for the majority of its length passes through rural surroundings. Russell, Ontario is named after Peter Russell, a government official and slave trader in Upper Canada.

== Route description ==
The segment of Russell Road from Industrial to Smyth is a 1.3 km two-lane collector street that cuts through the eastern edge of the Riverview neighbourhood. Addresses on this segment begin at 1636 Russell in the north and 1929 in the south. Generally, the west side of the street is home to post-World War II housing, while the east side is commercial, though there are homes on the east side closer to Smyth. Among this section's amenities are the Perley and Rideau Veteran's Health Centre (1720–1780), Russell Heights Ottawa Community Housing public housing (1761–1803), Russell Smyth Heights apartments (1825), Russell Manor Ottawa Community Housing (1909) and Smyth Medical Centre (1929).

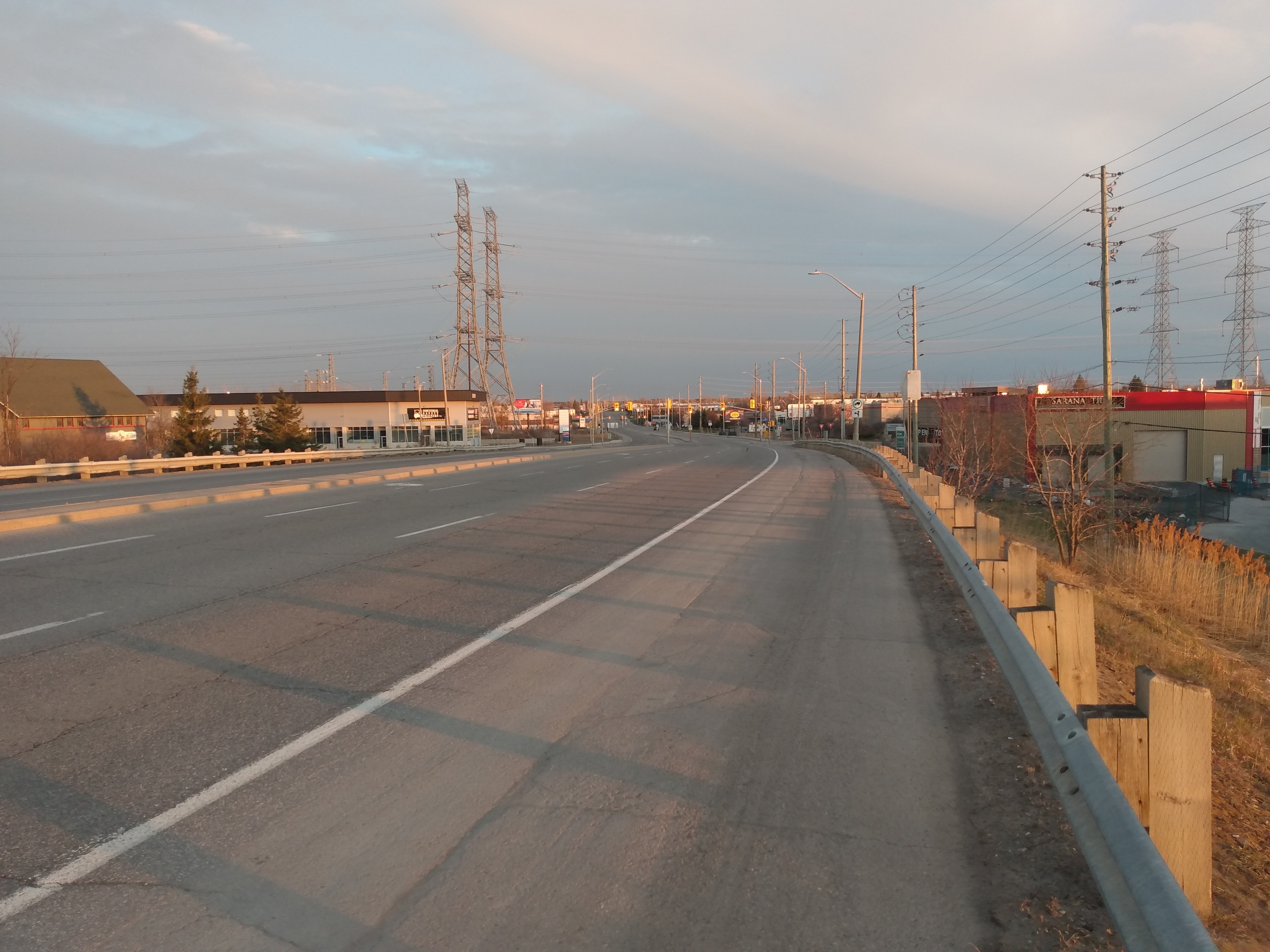
Russell Road between Walkley and Hawthorne

The second segment of Russell Road begins about 370 m southeast of terminus of the first segment. In this gap, there remains one building with a Russell address at 1990, a strip mall at the corner of Smyth and St. Laurent. The second segment of Russell does not begin until further southeast, at an intersection with St. Laurent Boulevard where St. Laurent turns into Russell, while St. Laurent begins a new segment at the intersection. It ends at a similar intersection with Hawthorne Road, where the road continues southward on Hawthorne, and a new segment of Russell begins. This segment is about 1.8 km long, and separates the neighbourhoods of Hawthorne Meadows on the west and Sheffield Glen on the east. The segment's addresses begin at 2080 and end at 2400. 2080 Russell is another public housing project known as Russell Gardens. Other amenities in this segment include Hawthorne United Church (2244) and a fourth public housing project, Confederation Court (2282). Between St. Laurent and Walkley, Russell is mostly a two-lane road. In addition to the housing projects, there are also ordinary dwellings on the west side of the street built around 1970. The short segment between Walkley and Hawthorne is a 4-lane divided arterial road.

The third segment of Russell begins at Hawthorne and ends at Ramsayville Road, and runs for 3.7 km. It is mostly rural in character, beginning at the suburban edge of the city, and heads southeast into the countryside. Addresses for this segment begin at 2434 and end at 4397. Amenities include the William E. Hay Centre, a youth detention centre (2464), St. George's Hawthorne Cemetery (3970) and Ramsayville Cemetery. Russell is two-lane arterial road in this segment. While mostly rural, there are a few industrial establishments north of Hunt Club.

The fourth segment of Russell begins 730m north of where the third segment ended on Ramsayville Road in the community of Ramsayville. This section is signed as Ottawa Road #26. Addresses on this segment begin at 4610. The road runs for 5 km eastward before merging with Leitrim Road. The road then runs another 1.5 km before splitting from Leitrim again at the northern edge of the community of Carlsbad Springs. Close to the bridge over Bear Brook, there is an historical plaque on the side of Russell detailing the history of the community. From Leitrim Rd, it's 2.9 km to the centre of Carlsbad Springs at Boundary Road. Russell Road then travels 10.3 km eastward until the community of Bearbrook at the intersection with Dunning Road. Bearbrook is home to the Bearbrook Community Hall at 8720 Russell and the Trinity Anglican Church Bearbrook (8785). From Bearbrook, the road travels 5.4 km eastward until the Ottawa city limits at Canaan Road, where it enters the city of Clarence-Rockland as Country Road 2. The last address on Russell in the city of Ottawa is 9999.

Upon entering Clarence-Rockland, addresses re-start at 102. 2.2 km east of the border is the community of Cheney, where Russell intersects with Drouin Road. Russell Road then travels 5.9 km to Marcil Road where it turns into Laval Street in Bourget. Along the way, it passes St. Francis Xavier Catholic High School at 1235 Russell. Russell Road begins again after 2.6 km as Laval Street, when it intersections with Labelle Road/Schnupp Road. It then travels 4 km east until the border with Alfred and Plantagenet when it becomes Boudreau Road.
