= Bear Brook (Ontario) =

Bear Brook ruisseau Bear
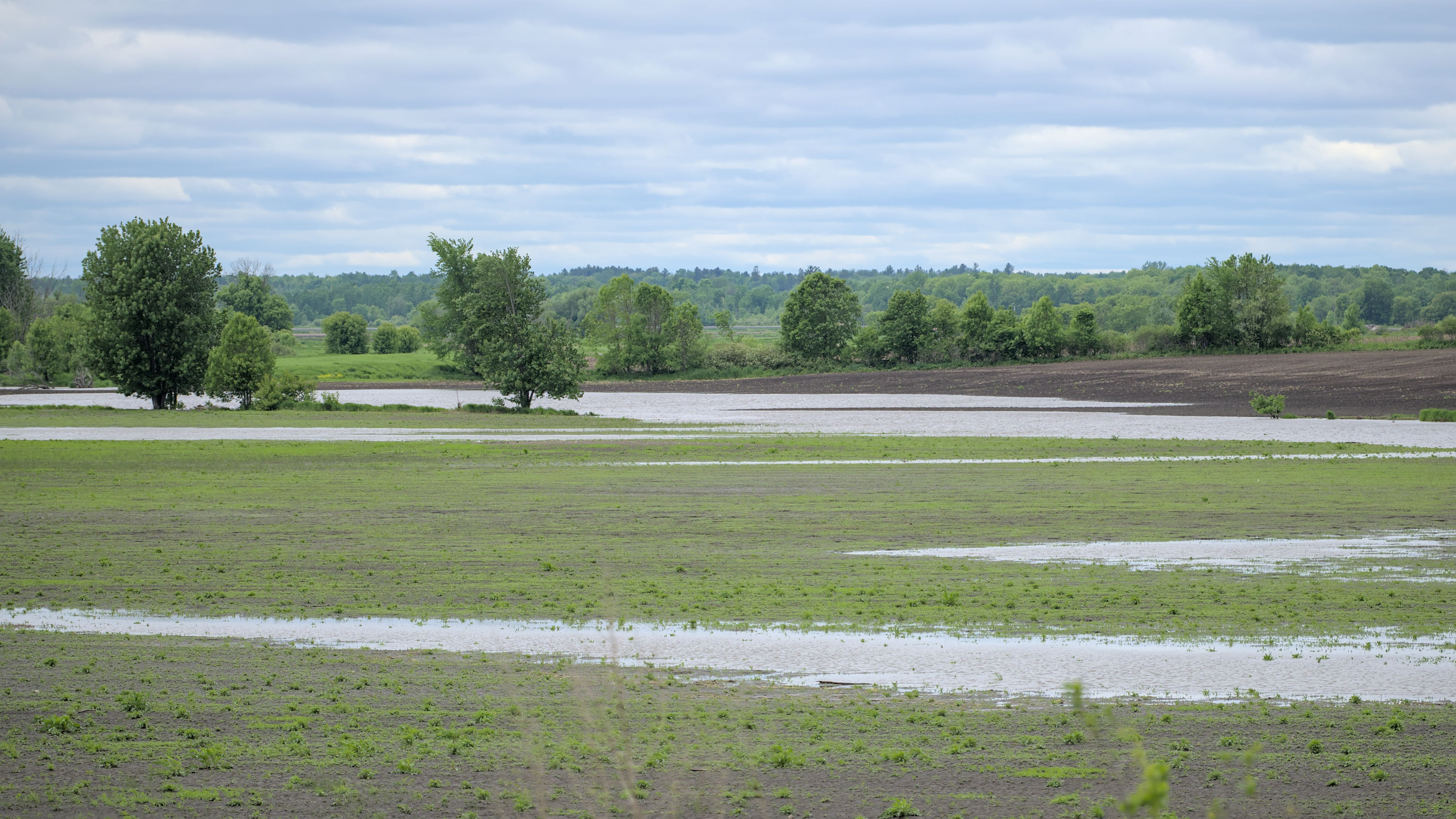
- Bear Brook floodplain west of Frank Kenny Road

Location
- Country: Canada
- Province: Ontario
- County: Prescott and Russell
- Municipalities: The Nation; Clarence-Rockland; Ottawa

Physical characteristics
- Source: Confluence of two unnamed streams
  - location: Edwards
  - coordinates: 45°20′54″N 75°27′49″W
  - elevation: 70 m (230 ft)
- Mouth: South Nation River
  - location: The Nation
  - coordinates: 45°25′11″N 75°04′13″W
  - elevation: 48 m (157 ft)

Basin features
- Progression: South Nation River→ Ottawa River→ Saint Lawrence River→ Gulf of Saint Lawrence
- River system: Ottawa River drainage basin

Bear Brook (French: ruisseau Bear) is a small stream in the municipalities of Clarence-Rockland and The Nation, United Counties of Prescott and Russell, and the city of Ottawa in eastern Ontario, Canada. It forms in the fields and forests just north of Edwards, and flows in a mostly eastern direction to its mouth as a left tributary of the South Nation River.

Communities along the brook include Edwards, Carlsbad Springs, Bearbrook, Cheney, and Bourget.

== History ==
In the mid 19th century, the Bear Brook was used by loggers for floating timber to sawmills, a few of which operated in Carlsbad Springs from 1854 to 1905. It was also used by settlers for transportation to their homesteads. However the brook was too small and dry in the summer, and its use for transportation was quickly discontinued upon completion of Russell Road. All the surrounding mature forests have been logged, and consequently the brook drains faster.

== Ecology ==
Bear Brook's floodplain near Frank Kenny Road and Milton Road is a noteworthy staging area for waterfowl during spring migration. Rare birds including Ross's goose, pink-footed goose, and barnacle goose have been observed in this location.

== See also ==
- List of rivers of Ontario
