= Bearbrook, Ontario =

Bearbrook
- dispersed rural community
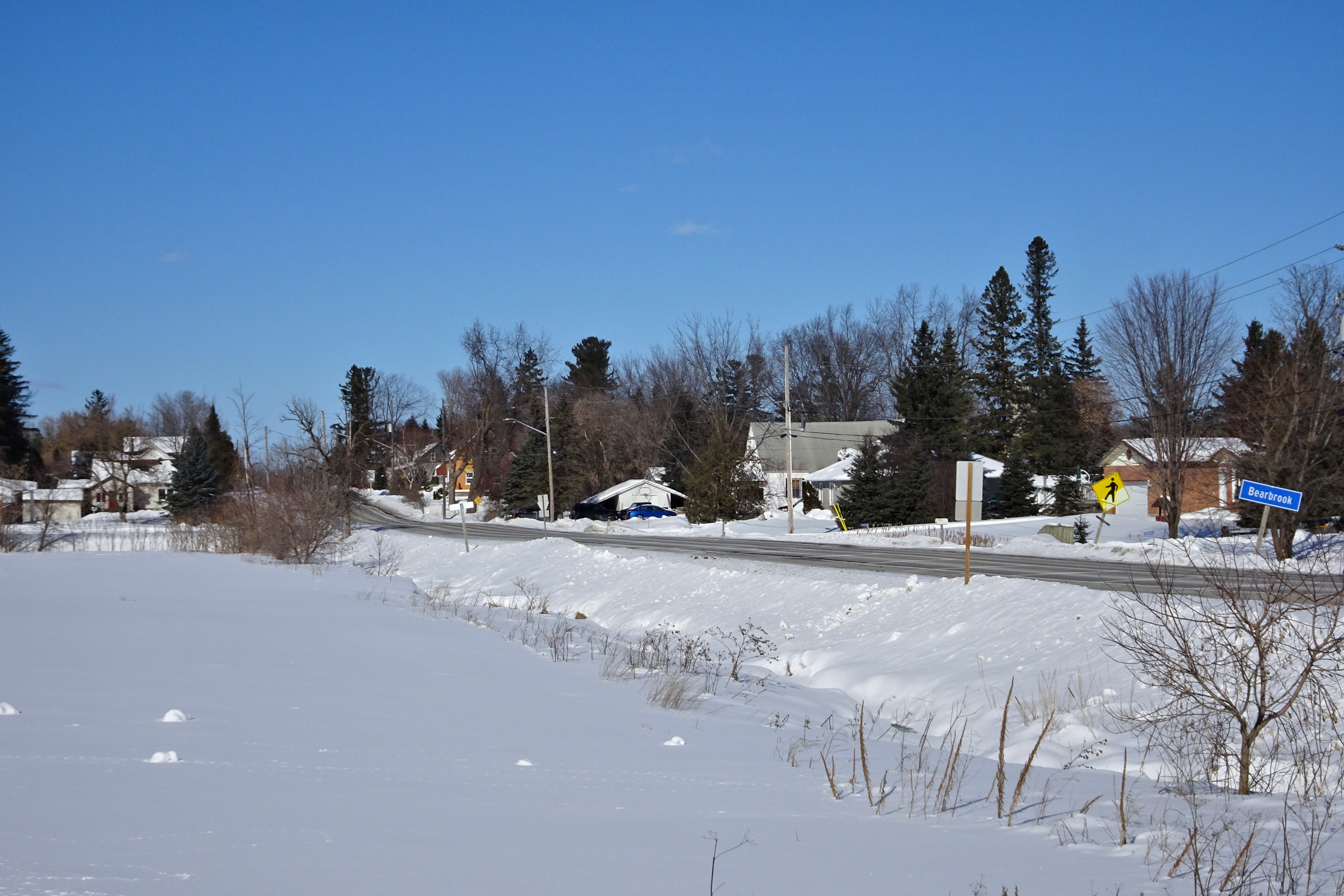

- Location within Ottawa Location within Southern Ontario
- Coordinates: 45°23′18″N 75°20′01″W
- Country: Canada
- Province: Ontario
- City: Ottawa
- First settled: 1824
- Elevation: 68 m (223 ft)
- Time zone: UTC-5 (Eastern Time Zone)
  - Summer (DST): UTC-4 (Eastern Time Zone)
- Postal code FSA: K4B
- Area codes: 613, 343

Bearbrook is a dispersed rural community in Cumberland Ward in the city of Ottawa, Ontario, Canada. It is named after the nearby small creek Bear Brook, a tributary of the South Nation River.

== History ==
The Bearbrook area, part of the then township of Cumberland, was first settled in 1824. Bearbrook Village's Postal Office (in the General Store) was opened in 1855 with John Walsh being named the first post master. Bearbrook Station was established when the train station was built. Parish of Trinity Anglican was formed in 1863 in a wooden church centered in the village of Bearbrook. Trinity Anglican Stone church was built in 1900. st School SSNo.4 Southwest of Bearbrook, also served Navan near the corner of what is currently Russell Road and Forced Road.

In the mid 19th century, during the early days of settlement, the Bear Brook was used by loggers for floating timber to sawmills, a few of which operated in Carlsbad Springs from 1854 to 1905. It was also used by settlers for transportation to their homesteads. However the brook was too small and dry in the summer, and its use for transportation was quickly discontinued upon completion of Russell Road. All the surrounding mature forests have been logged, and consequently the brook drains faster.

== Recreation ==
Bearbrook has a community building operated by the city of Ottawa. Next to the community building is a skate park, a baseball field and a playground.

== Transportation ==
The community is at the junction of Russell Road (roughly east–west), signed at this point as Ottawa Road 26, and Dunning Road (roughly north–south), signed north of the junction as Ottawa Road 35. Carlsbad Springs is to the west; Cheney, Ontario, a community in the city of Clarence-Rockland, to the east; and the community of Leonard to the north. Forced Road leads southwest to the community of Vars and interchange 88 Rockland Road on Ontario Highway 417.

== Religion ==
The community is served by Trinity Anglican Church, part of the four-point charge of the Anglican Parish of Bearbrook, Navan and Blackburn.
