= St. Laurent Boulevard (Ottawa) =

Road in Ottawa, Ontario, Canada

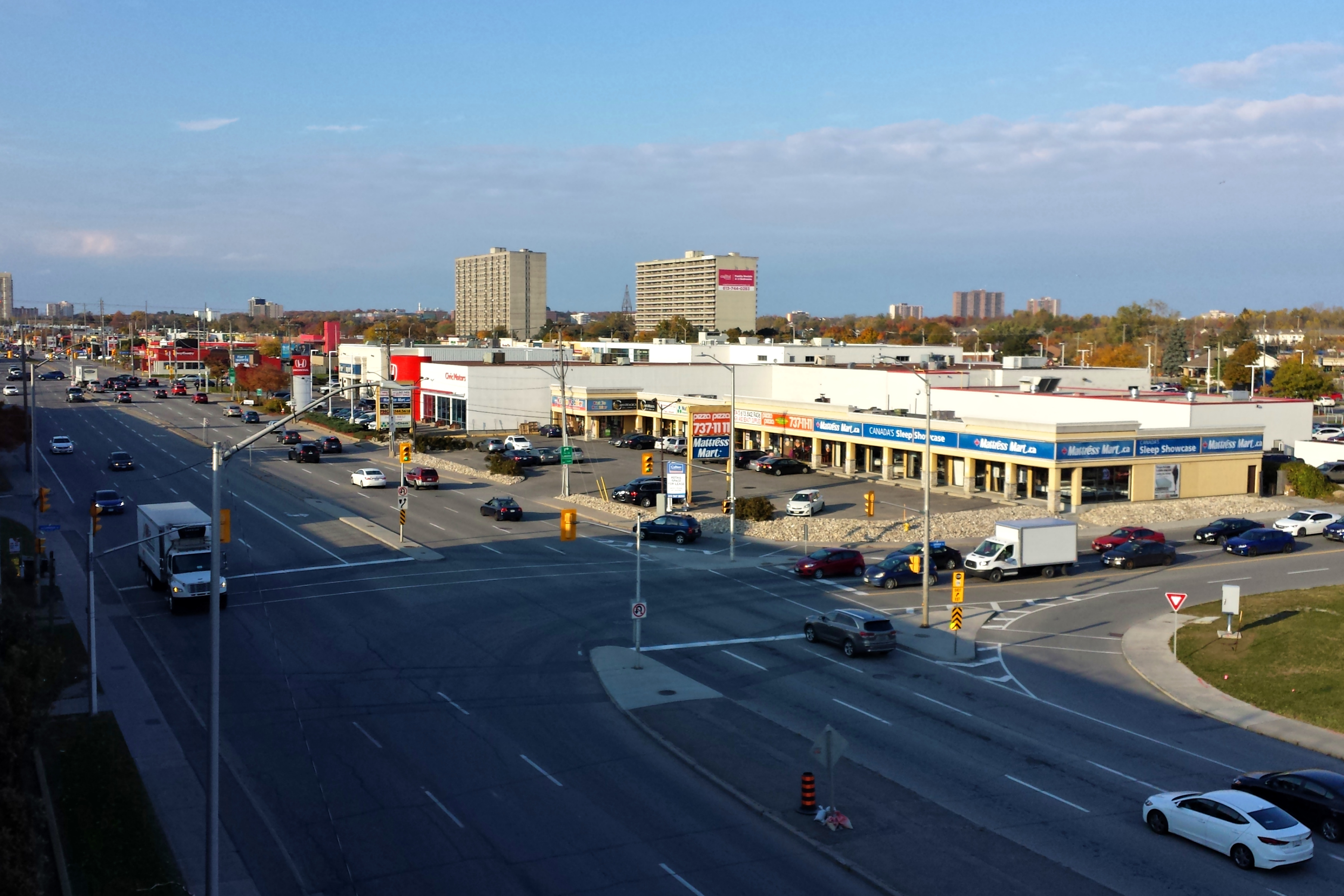
St. Laurent Blvd at the St. Laurent Mall

St. Laurent Boulevard (/ˌsæ̃ ləˈrɒ̃/); Ottawa Road #26) is an arterial road in Ottawa, Ontario, Canada. Beginning at the Royal Canadian Mounted Police college complex at Sandridge Road in the Manor Park neighbourhood, St. Laurent Boulevard runs in a straight line, slightly east of south, until it reaches Walkley Road. It then curves west and intersects with Conroy Road and Don Reid Drive. In Ottawa, the name of the street is pronounced exclusively in French, even among Anglophones, as it honours former Canadian Prime Minister Louis St. Laurent. Prior to 1951, it was known as Base Line Road.

== Northern section ==
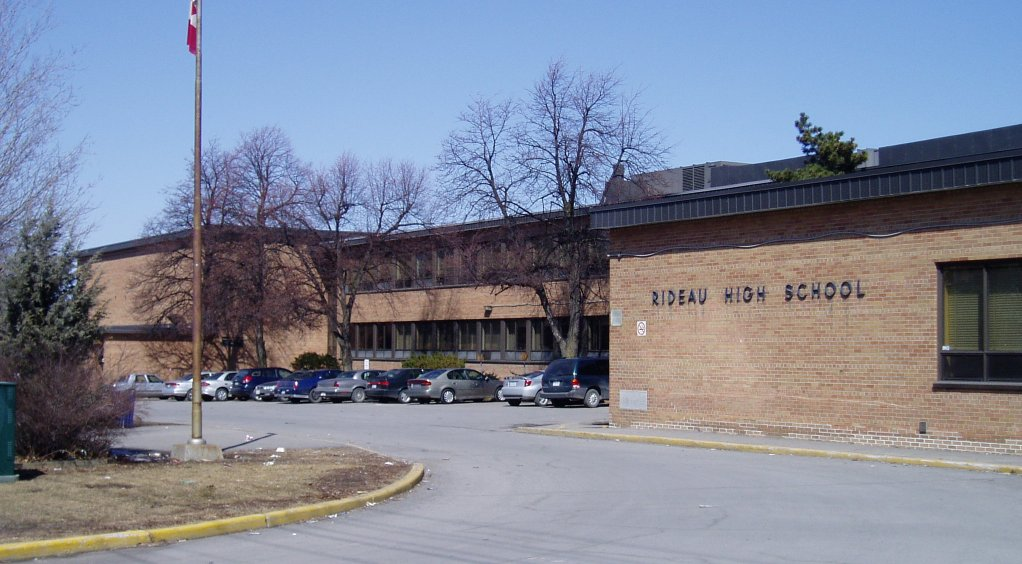
Rideau High School on St. Laurent Boulevard.

The northern part of the street, not yet a boulevard, skirts the residential Manor Park neighbourhood. South of Hemlock Road, it passes Beechwood Cemetery, one of the most important in the city, and also several high towers including the 30-story Le Parc building, which is the third tallest in the city.

The road becomes mostly commercial starting from McArthur Avenue up to Highway 417. At the corner of Coventry Road lies the St. Laurent Shopping Centre, one of the biggest malls in the city. OC Transpo's St-Laurent station (the upper level) is located right beside the on ramp for Highway 417 westbound.

== Southern section ==
South of Highway 417 and Tremblay Road, the road becomes more industrial as it crosses a small industrial district to its east. OC Transpo's (Ottawa's transit company) main offices are located at the corner of Belfast Road, another key industrial road, which is also a link to Via Rail Ottawa station at its western end.

Past Innes Road, it enters another important commercial district until Russell Road. To its east, one can see the Canadian Museum of Science and Technology, a key tourist destination since the 1960s, at Lancaster Road. Also located at the corner of Russell Road lies Elmvale Shopping Centre, a mid-sized mall, serving the Alta Vista and Pleasant Park neighbourhoods to its west.

Branching to the west off Russell Road, it reverts to two lanes and runs through a residential area, then south of Walkley Road it enters a business park including some technology companies. It ends behind the former building of CKKL-FM radio station just west of Conroy Road.

== Speed limits ==
Speed limits vary throughout the road. North of Hemlock Road, the speed limit is 40 km/h (25 mph) with two lanes. Between Hemlock Road and McArthur Avenue, the speed limit is 50 km/h (31 mph) on first two lanes of traffic, expanding to four lanes of traffic at Montreal Road. Then, from McArthur Avenue past the St Laurent Shopping Centre and the 417 south to Tremblay Road, it increases to 60 km/h (37 mph). Then from Tremblay Road until Smyth Road, it reaches its highest speed limit of 70 km/h (43 mph). From there to its end, the limit reduces once more to 50 km/h.

== Major intersections ==
- Montreal Road
- Ogilvie Road
- Highway 417
- Innes Road & Industrial Avenue
- Russell Road
- Walkley Road
- Conroy Road

== Communities ==
- Manor Park
- Overbrook
- Elmvale
- Alta Vista
