= Hunt Club Park =

- Neighbourhood
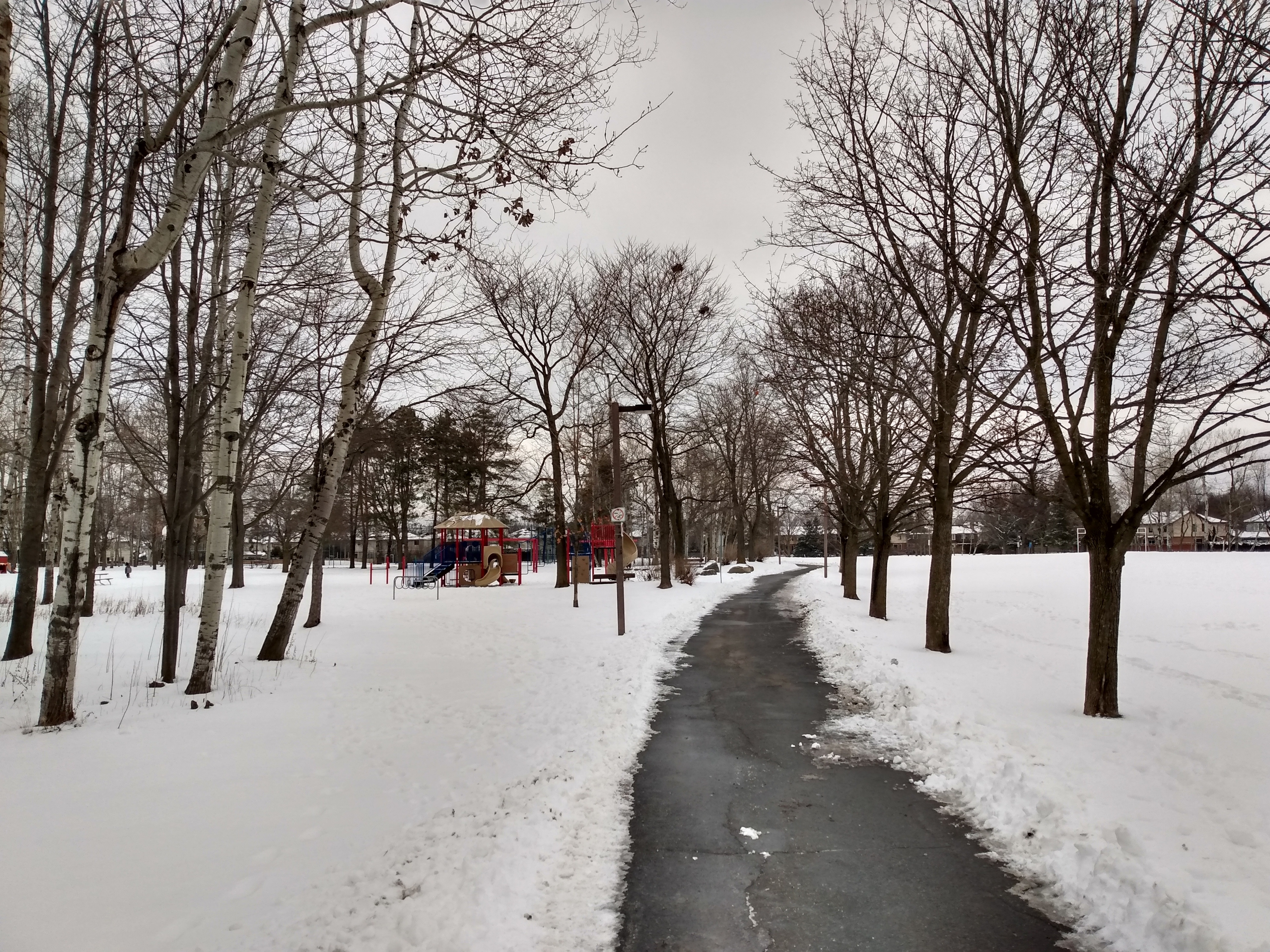
- Elizabeth Manley Park

- Location within Ottawa
- Coordinates: 45°22′24″N 75°36′41″W
- Country: Canada
- Province: Ontario
- City: Ottawa

Government
  - MPs: David McGuinty
  - MPPs: John Fraser
  - Councillors: Jessica Bradley
  - Governing body: Hunt Club Park Community Association

Area
  - Total: 4.491 km^{2} (1.734 sq mi)
- Elevation: 85 m (279 ft)

Population (2016)
  - Total: 8,820
  - Density: 1,960/km^{2} (5,090/sq mi)
- Canada 2016 Census
- Time zone: UTC-5 (Eastern (EST))
- Forward sortation area: K1G
- Website: Hunt Club Park Community Association

Hunt Club Park (French: Parc Hunt Club) is a residential neighbourhood in Gloucester-Southgate Ward in the south end of Ottawa, Ontario, Canada. The Ottawa Neighbourhood Study defines the boundaries of the neighbourhood as being Johnston Road-Blohm Drive and Hunterswood Crescent on the north, Hunt Club Road on the south, Hawthorne Road on the east and Conroy Road on the west. The neighbourhood generally corresponds to Census Tracts 5050001.08 and 5050001.07 which had a combined population of 8,825 as of the Canada 2016 Census. The Census also showed 5 people living east of Hawthorne Road, an area generally not considered part of the neighbourhood, but part of the former census tract.

== History ==
Originally part of Gloucester Township, what is now Hunt Club Park was annexed by the city of Ottawa in 1950, though at the time it was just farm land. The neighbourhood began to be developed in the 1980s by Richcraft Homes, beginning in the west. The eastern part of the neighbourhood was re-zoned in 1987 from industrial to residential, and was completed within the decade. A further development was built near Southwood Park, north of Johnston Road in the early 2000s.

The name "Hunt Club Park" was first applied to the neighbouring Greenboro (also built by Richcraft) when it was being built in the 1980s. By the 1990s, Hunt Club Park was described as starting at Lorry Greenberg Dr, with Greenboro being north and west. The area south of Lorry Greenberg is now considered part of Greenboro.

== Demographics ==
Hunt Club Park has one of the largest Arabic speaking populations in the city, with 16% having Arabic as their mother tongue. English is still the largest language group (51%). French is the third largest language group (12%).

== Amenities ==
The main park in the neighbourhood is Elizabeth Manley Park, which includes a sports field, outdoor rink, a wading pool, ball diamond, pickleball courts, tennis courts, and a playground. Other parks in the neighbourhood include Southwood Park, Topley Park, Controy Park, Dossetter Park, Karsh Park, Calzavara Family Park, Ghosh Park and Forestglade Park. The Calzavara Family Park also includes an outdoor rink, ball diamond and a playground. Schools in the neighbourhood include Robert Bateman Public School and St. Thomas More School. The neighbourhood includes a number of Ottawa Community Housing properties, including Blohm Court, Cameron Court, Esson Place, Hunt Club Place and Karsh Court.
