= Gloucester Glen =

Coordinates: 45°16′55″N 75°41′45″W

Gloucester Glen is a community on the Rideau River in eastern Ontario, Canada. It is located in the former City of Gloucester in the City of Ottawa. It is between the communities of Cedardale to the north and Honey Gables to the south, and bound by the Rideau River to the west and River Road to the east, adjacent to the new Riverside South subdivision. It is a very quiet community with many older homes. There are approximately only 45 houses that make up this community.
