= Hawthorne Meadows =

- Neighbourhood
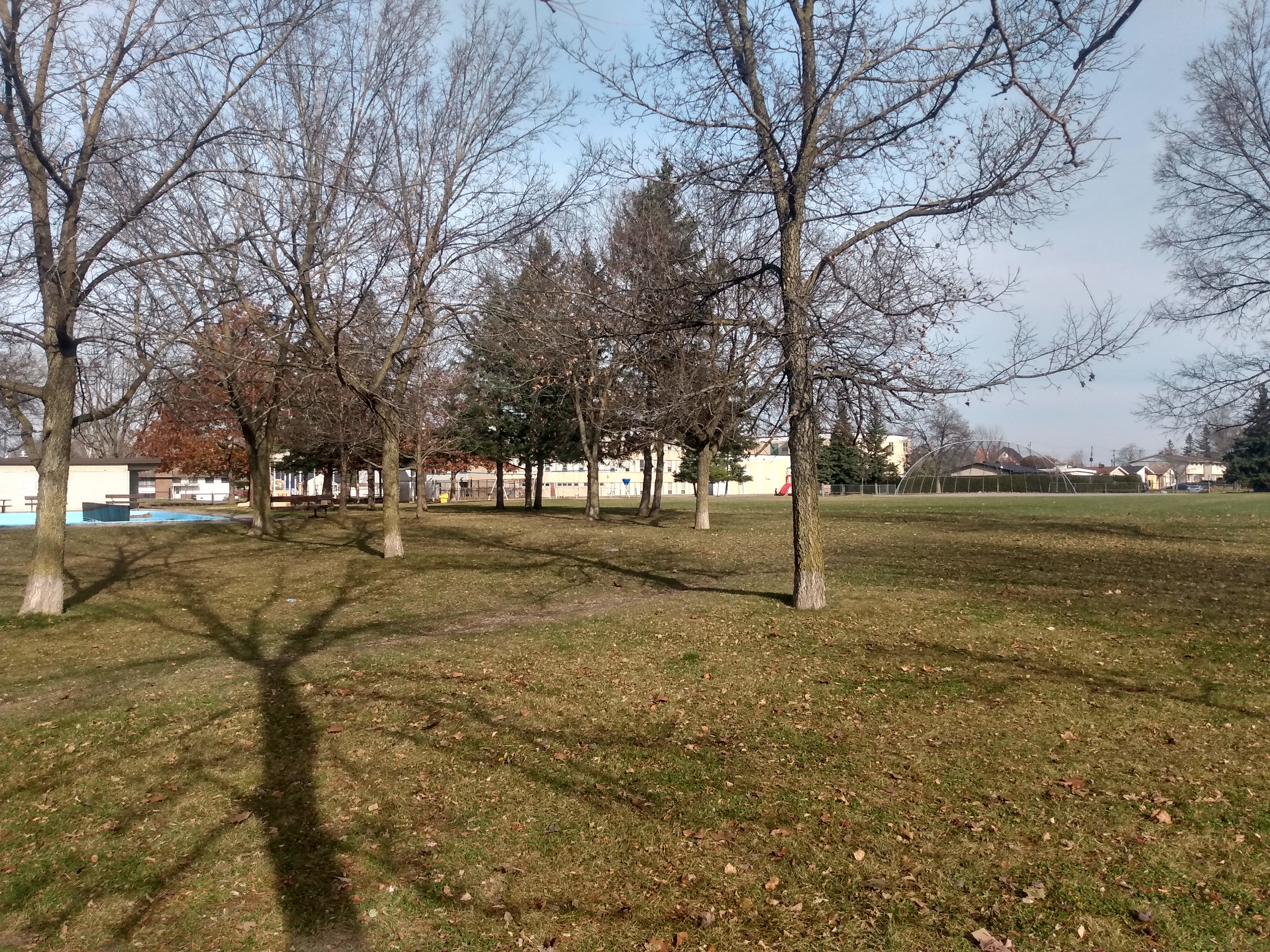
- Hawthorne Park

- Location within Ottawa
- Coordinates: 45°23′32″N 75°35′57″W
- Country: Canada
- Province: Ontario
- City: Ottawa

Government
  - MPs: David McGuinty
  - MPPs: John Fraser
  - Councillors: Marty Carr

Area
  - Total: 0.606 km^{2} (0.234 sq mi)
- Elevation: 75 m (246 ft)

Population (2016)
  - Total: 3,577
  - Density: 5,903/km^{2} (15,290/sq mi)
- Canada 2016 Census
- Time zone: UTC-5 (Eastern (EST))
- Forward sortation area: K1G

Hawthorne Meadows is a neighbourhood in Alta Vista Ward in southeast Ottawa, Ontario, Canada. It is triangular in shape; it is bounded on the west by St. Laurent Boulevard, on the northeast by Russell Road and on the south by Walkley Road. According to the Canada 2016 Census, the population of this area was 3,577.

== History ==
The neighbourhood exists at the site of the Hawthorne Post office and Orange Hall which was located at the corner of present day Walkley and Russell Roads. The neighbourhood was mostly built in the 1960s by Minto Construction. A community association was formed in 1961.

== Demographics ==
The neighbourhood corresponds to Census Tract 5050010.00 (which also consists of the St. Laurent Square apartments, which are not in the neighbourhood). According to the 2016 Census, 47% of the population were Anglophones and 20% were Francophones. Other major languages include Arabic (8%), Somali (4%), Tagalog (3%), Spanish (2%), Creoles (2%), Italian (1%), Swahili (1%) and Urdu (1%).

According to the Canada 2016 Census, 45% of the Census Tract was White, 22% was Black, 8% Arab, 5% Filipino, 5% South Asian, 2% Latin American, 2% West Asian, 2% Indigenous and 1% Southeast Asian.
