= Sheffield Glen =

Coordinates: 45°23′50″N 75°36′50″W

Sheffield Glen is a neighbourhood in Alta Vista Ward in southeast Ottawa, Ontario, Canada. It is bounded on the west by Russell Road, on the south by Walkley Road and on the north and east by Lancaster Road. The neighbourhood is more commonly referred to as Southvale by Ottawans, but appears as Sheffield Glen on maps. Southvale Crescent is the name of the main street which runs through the neighbourhood and is home to a majority of residents. The neighbourhood is home to many apartment buildings and townhouses. Its population according to the Canada 2011 Census was 2877. This decreased to 2,744 according to the Canada 2016 Census.

The Canadian Museum of Science and Technology is located adjacent to the neighbourhood on Lancaster Road.

The neighbourhood is surrounded on three sides by industrial areas, and on the west side by Hawthorne Meadows.
