= Huda Mukbil =

Canadian security intelligence operative and activist

Huda Mukbil is a Canadian former security intelligence operative and prominent social activist.

== Early life ==
Mukbil was born into a middle-class family in Dire Dawa, Ethiopia, and her family fled during the Ethiopian Civil War in the 70s. She and her family spent some time in Egypt before immigrating to Canada. She graduated from Carleton University and received a B.A. in Law then obtaining an M.A. in Feminist and Gender Studies from the University of Ottawa.

== Career ==
Mukbil joined the Canadian Security Intelligence Service (CSIS) a month before the September 11 attacks, becoming the first "Black Arab-Canadian Muslim spy". In 2005, she worked with British intelligence service MI5 to interpret telephone conversations of London bombing suspect Hamdi Isaac who spoke Arabic and Harari.

Before leaving her position at CSIS in 2017, she would be part of a seven figure legal action against her employer. She accused CSIS of tolerating racism and sexism within their departments, among other charges.

Mukbil entered politics in 2021 Canadian federal election, running as a New Democratic Party nominee in the Ottawa South riding.

In 2023, she released her memoir titled "Agent Of Change: My Life Fighting Terrorists, Spies and Institutional Racism". In 2024 it won the Ottawa Book Award for best non-fiction in its category.

== Personal life ==
Mukbil is a Canadian Citizen of Harari and Yemeni background. She is also a Muslim.
