= Jessica Bradley (politician) =

Canadian politician

Ottawa City Councillor
- Incumbent
- Assumed office November 15, 2022
- Preceded by: Diane Deans
- Constituency: Gloucester-Southgate Ward

Personal details
- Born: October 25, 1988 (age 37) Brantford, Ontario

Jessica Emma Bradley (born October 25, 1988) is a Canadian politician. She is currently the city councillor for Gloucester-Southgate Ward on Ottawa City Council. She was first elected in the 2022 Ottawa municipal election.

== Early life ==
Bradley was born in Brantford, Ontario. She graduated with a political science degree from the University of Western Ontario. In her third year at Western, she studied at the International University in Moscow, studying the Russian Language and Cultural Studies. Following her graduation at Western, she worked for the City of Brantford's election office, helping to organize the 2010 Brantford municipal election. A relationship caused her to move to Ottawa in 2011, where she began working for Statistics Canada, working as an operational field manager during the 2011 Canada Census. She would also work in the 2016 and 2021 Censuses. Following the 2011 Census, she began working for city councillor Diane Deans, her predecessor, and was promoted as a policy advisor in her office in 2014.

== Career ==
Deans, who had represented the ward since 1994, endorsed Bradley in the 2022 municipal election, when she ran to replace her in Gloucester-Southgate Ward. Bradley's priorities in the election were "better parks, green spaces, roads and paths, and more affordable housing". Bradley easily won election to council, defeating her next closest opponent by over 2,000 votes, and winning 42% of the vote.

Following her election, Bradley was named Vice-Chair of the Community Services Committee and was named to the Emergency Preparedness and Protective Services Committee, the Transportation Committee, and was named City Council's Liaison for the Anishinabe Algonquin Nation Civic Cultural Protocol and Implementation Plan.
