= David McGuinty =

Canadian politician (born 1960)

The Honourable David McGuinty PC MP
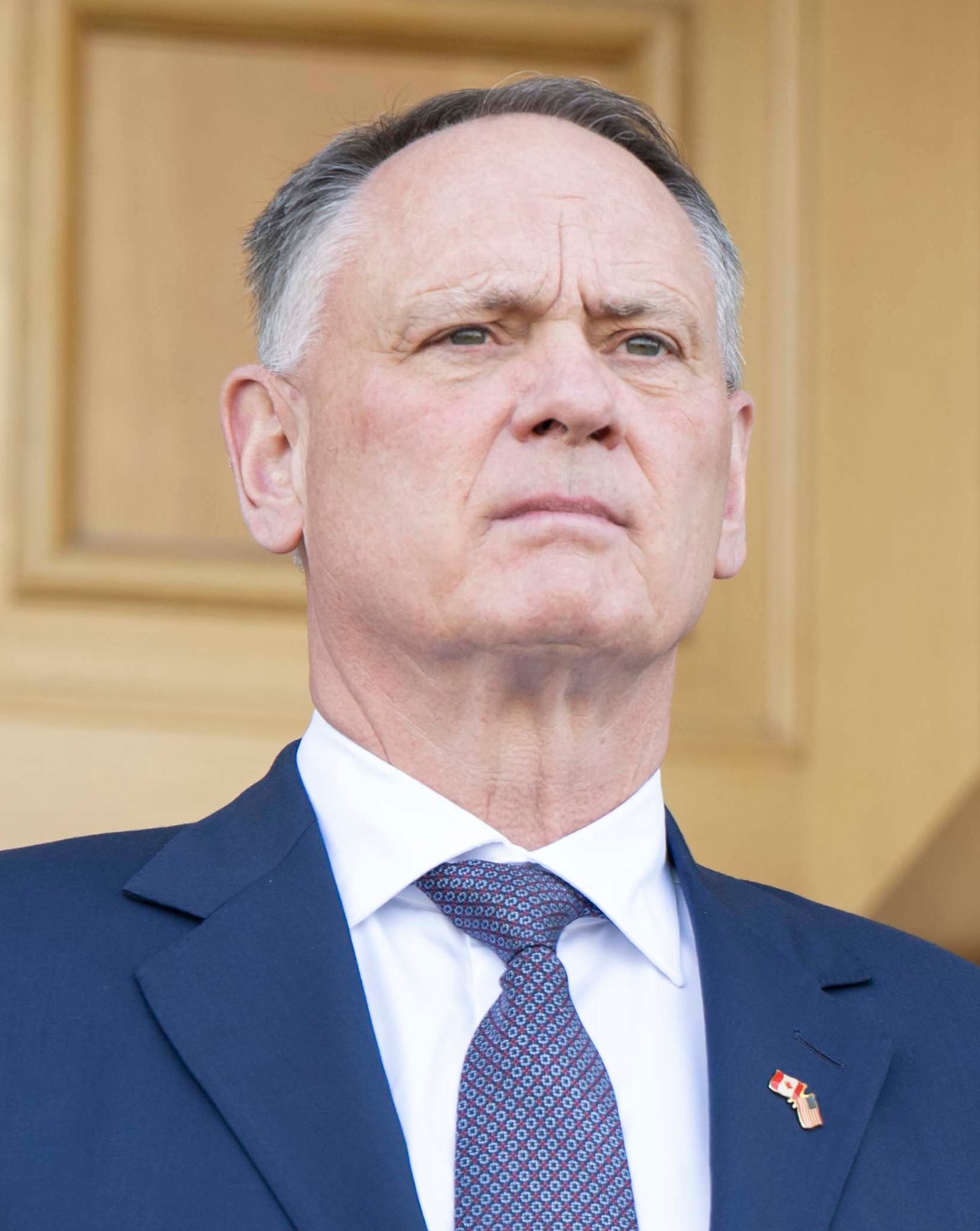
- McGuinty in 2025

Minister of National Defence
- Incumbent
- Assumed office May 13, 2025
- Prime Minister: Mark Carney
- Preceded by: Bill Blair

Minister of Public Safety and Emergency Preparedness
- In office March 14, 2025 – May 13, 2025
- Prime Minister: Mark Carney
- Preceded by: Himself (Public Safety); Harjit Sajjan (Emergency Preparedness)
- Succeeded by: Gary Anandasangaree (Public Safety); Eleanor Olszewski (Emergency Management)

Minister of Public Safety
- In office December 20, 2024 – March 14, 2025
- Prime Minister: Justin Trudeau
- Preceded by: Dominic LeBlanc
- Succeeded by: Himself

Chair of the National Security and Intelligence Committee of Parliamentarians
- In office November 6, 2017 – December 20, 2024
- Prime Minister: Justin Trudeau
- Preceded by: Position established
- Succeeded by: Patricia Lattanzio

Member of Parliament for Ottawa South
- Incumbent
- Assumed office June 28, 2004
- Preceded by: John Manley

Personal details
- Born: David Joseph McGuinty; February 25, 1960 (age 66) Ottawa, Ontario, Canada
- Party: Liberal
- Spouse: Brigitte Bélanger
- Parent: Dalton McGuinty Sr. (father)
- Relatives: Dalton McGuinty (brother)
- Education: Kemptville College (Dipl.); University of Ottawa (BA); Université de Sherbrooke (LLB); London School of Economics (LLM)
- Website: Official website

David Joseph McGuinty (born February 25, 1960) is a Canadian lawyer and politician who has been Minister of National Defence since May 2025. A member of the Liberal Party, McGuinty has served as the member of Parliament (MP) for Ottawa South since 2004. From 2017 to 2024, McGuinty was the first chair of the National Security and Intelligence Committee of Parliamentarians (NSICOP), an agency which oversees Canadian intelligence services.

== Early life ==
David McGuinty was born and raised in Ontario in a family of twelve. His parents are politician and professor Dalton McGuinty Sr. and full-time nurse Elizabeth McGuinty (née Pexton). Being the son of a Francophone mother and an Anglophone father, McGuinty is bilingual. He earned a Diploma in Agriculture from the Kemptville College of Agriculture, a Bachelor of Arts in English Literature at the University of Ottawa, specialized diplomas in Civil and Comparative Law at Université de Sherbrooke in Quebec, a Bachelor of Laws at the University of Ottawa, and finally a Master of Laws at the London School of Economics and Political Science.

An environmental lawyer by profession, he has long been closely involved in Liberal politics. He was chosen to serve as president and chief executive officer (CEO) of the Prime Minister's National Round Table on the Environment and the Economy, a government think-tank concerned with sustainable development.

== Political career ==
=== In government (2004–2006) ===
While not invited to join Paul Martin's Cabinet, McGuinty served on the House of Commons Standing Committee on the Environment and Sustainable Development. He also served as chairman of the Liberal Party's National Capital Region Caucus.

=== In opposition (2006–2015) ===
On May 30, 2006, interim Liberal leader Bill Graham appointed McGuinty as the Official Opposition critic for Transport.

In the 2006 Liberal leadership contest, McGuinty endorsed the candidacy of Michael Ignatieff.

With the election of Stephane Dion as leader of the Liberal Party McGuinty became the critic for Environment in January 2007.

With the appointment of Michael Ignatieff as leader of the party, McGuinty was named Environment and Energy critic when Ignatieff announced his shadow cabinet on January 22, 2009. In September 2010, McGuinty was promoted to the role of Opposition House Leader.

Following the resignation of Michael Ignatieff, Interim leader Bob Rae named McGuinty as the Liberal Party's Critic for Natural Resources in June 2011, a demotion from his previous position as Opposition House Leader.

==== Leadership aspirations ====
In 2008, following the failed leadership of Stephane Dion and his pending resignation, McGuinty was considered a potential candidate to succeed him but announced in November 2008, that he would not seek the leader and instead endorsed Michael Ignatieff, Dion later appointed him as the critic for International Trade.

In 2011, when Ignatieff led the Liberal Party to their worst result in its history, McGuinty's name was again mentioned as a possible candidate to succeed Ignatieff.

At the Liberal Party's biennial convention in January 2012, McGuinty announced he was considering a bid for the leadership of the party and that he would make his decision over the coming months. However, on November 15, 2012, McGuinty confirmed he would not be seeking the Liberal leadership.

==== International work ====
In 2012 McGuinty was elected to head the Canadian chapter of an international alliance of lawmakers, Globe International, that presses governments to address global environment and economy challenges. He received all-party support to become the president of Globe Canada on June 12.

In 2012 McGuinty was invited by the National Democratic Institute to join their Pre-Election Assessment Mission to Ukraine.

==== Oil and gas criticism ====
On November 20, 2012, following a meeting of the Natural Resources Committee, McGuinty stated, among other things, that Conservative MPs were "shilling" for the oil and gas industry, did not belong in the national legislature, and should "go back to Alberta."

The Conservative response was critical, as exemplified by Prime Minister Stephen Harper who said: "I find it shameful, I guess not surprising, but shameful, that 30 years after the National Energy Program, these anti-Alberta attitudes are so close to the surface in the Liberal party." Interim leader Bob Rae apologized on behalf of the Liberal Party and said McGuinty was away on family business for the following week.

The following day McGuinty resigned as natural resources critic. He apologized saying, "As member of Parliament for Ottawa South, I would like to unreservedly and unequivocally apologize for comments which I made with respect to parliamentary colleagues from the province of Alberta. My words in no way reflect the views of my party or leader, and I offer my apology to them as well as my colleagues from Alberta. I hold all parliamentarians in high esteem, and I regret my choice of words, as I can understand the offence they have caused."

==== Attendance record ====
In early 2014, McGuinty was accused of being a "part-time" Member of Parliament by the Conservative Riding Association, who were subsequently unable to explain how they calculated McGuinty's time in the House of Commons, given that the House does not keep attendance records.

=== Back in government (2015–) ===
==== NSICOP Chair ====
In 2017, McGuinty was appointed as the first chair to the new established National Security and Intelligence Committee of Parliamentarians (NSICOP). In 2024, as the chair of NSICOP, a report was released on foreign interference in Canada's elections and society. It stated that the interference came from foreign governments such as China, India and Iran. McGuinty stated that he welcomed Canadians having discussions on foreign interference. However, he took issue that much of the attention was focused on the revelations that some MPs worked with foreign governments and not other aspects of interference like the media. McGuinty also stated that political party leaders should not be partisan on the topic of foreign interference.

==== Minister of Public Safety ====
Following a cabinet shuffle, McGuinty was appointed Minister of Public Safety in the 29th Canadian Ministry on December 20, 2024.

== Personal life ==
McGuinty is the brother of former premier of Ontario Dalton McGuinty (born 1955) and the son of former member of Provincial Parliament (MPP) Dalton McGuinty Sr. (1926–1990). He is married to Brigitte Bélanger and has four children.

== Electoral record ==
2025 Canadian federal election: Ottawa South
Party	Candidate	Votes	%	±%	Expenditures
Liberal	David McGuinty	43,388	65.18	+15.77	$84,089.33
Conservative	Blair Turner	18,010	27.06	+0.09	$135,029.53
New Democratic	Hena Masjedee	4,017	6.03	–12.09	$35,097.74
Green	Nira Dookeran	642	0.96	–1.23	$3,039.50
Christian Heritage	Alex Perrier	259	0.39	N/A	$717.11
Rhinoceros	William Cooper	155	0.23	N/A	$0.00
Canadian Future	John Redins	93	0.14	N/A	$0.00
Total valid votes/expense limit		66,564	99.25	+0.21	$141,803.28
Total rejected ballots		503	0.75	–0.21	
Turnout		67,067	69.17	+3.41	
Eligible voters		96,956			
Liberal notional hold		Swing		+7.84	
Source: Elections Canada

2021 Canadian federal election: Ottawa South
Party	Candidate	Votes	%	±%	Expenditures
Liberal	David McGuinty	29,038	48.81	-3.51	$90,172.30
Conservative	Eli Tannis	15,497	26.05	+1.54	$109,078.40
New Democratic	Huda Mukbil	11,514	19.35	+3.36	$30,779.59
People's	Chylow Hall	1,898	3.19	+2.09	$5,112.54
Green	Les Schram	1,401	2.35	-3.22	$1,305.45
Communist	Larry Wasslen	144	0.24	+0.09	$0.00
Total valid votes/expense limit		59,529	99.04	–	$118,434.85
Total rejected ballots		575	0.96	+0.09	
Turnout		60,069	66.71	-4.39	
Eligible voters		90,041			
Liberal hold		Swing		-2.52	
Source: Elections Canada

2019 Canadian federal election: Ottawa South
Party	Candidate	Votes	%	±%	Expenditures
Liberal	David McGuinty	34,205	52.32	-7.74	$80,576.61
Conservative	Eli Tannis	16,025	24.51	+0.21	$106,966.51
New Democratic	Morgan Gay	10,457	16.00	+4.42	none listed
Green	Les Schram	3,645	5.58	+2.66	$3,248.53
People's	Rodrigo André Bolaños	717	1.10	–	none listed
Independent	Ahmed Bouragba	141	0.22	–	$0.00
Communist	Larry Wasslen	99	0.15	-0.06	none listed
Independent	Sarmad Laith	87	0.13	–	none listed
Total valid votes/expense limit		65,376	99.13	–	
Total rejected ballots		574	0.87	+0.33	
Turnout		65,950	71.10	-2.46	
Eligible voters		92,759			
Liberal hold		Swing		-3.98	
Source: Elections Canada

2015 Canadian federal election
Party	Candidate	Votes	%	±%	Expenditures
Liberal	David McGuinty	38,831	60.06	+16.05	$119,103.32
Conservative	Dev Balkissoon	15,711	24.30	-8.98	$89,467.46
New Democratic	George Brown	7,480	11.57	-6.59	$18,683.33
Green	John Redins	1,888	2.92	-0.11	$3,221.56
Progressive Canadian	Al Gullon	366	0.57	–	–
Libertarian	Damien Wilson	237	0.37	–	$97.29
Communist	Larry Wasslen	136	0.21	–	–
Total valid votes/Expense limit		64,649	99.46		$225,034.63
Total rejected ballots		351	0.54	–	
Turnout		65,000	73.56	–	
Eligible voters		88,368			
Liberal hold		Swing		+12.52	
Source: Elections Canada

2011 Canadian federal election
Party	Candidate	Votes	%	±%	Expenditures
Liberal	David McGuinty	25,963	44.01	-5.89	–
Conservative	Elie Salibi	19,634	33.28	-0.09	–
New Democratic	James McLaren	10,712	18.16	+9.71	–
Green	Mick Kitor	1,787	3.03	-3.74	–
Progressive Canadian	Al Gullon	513	0.87	-0.19	–
Pirate	Mike Bleskie	382	0.65	n.a.	–
Total valid votes		58,991	100.00	–	
Total rejected ballots		279	0.47	-0.12	
Turnout		59,270	69.11%		
Liberal hold		Swing		-5.80	
Source: Elections Canada

2008 Canadian federal election
Party	Candidate	Votes	%	±%	Expenditures
Liberal	David McGuinty	29,035	49.90	+5.75	$82,793
Conservative	Elie Salibi	19,417	33.37	-4.06	$89,808
New Democratic	Hijal De Sarkar	4,920	8.45	-4.78	$5,110
Green	Qais Ghanem	3,939	6.77	+2.03	$20,330
Progressive Canadian	Al Gullon	620	1.06	+0.62	$92
Libertarian	Jean-Serge Brisson	244	0.41	–	
Total valid votes/Expense limit		58,175	100.00	$89,843	
Total rejected ballots		346	0.59	+0.11	
Turnout		58,521	66.82	-4.89	
Liberal hold		Swing		+4.91	

2006 Canadian federal election
Party	Candidate	Votes	%	±%	Expenditures
Liberal	David McGuinty	27,158	44.15	+0.33	$78,559
Conservative	Allan Cutler	23,028	37.43	+2.62	$74,021
New Democratic	Henri Sader	8,138	13.23	-0.41	$30,456
Green	John Ford	2,913	4.74	-1.00	$2,095
Progressive Canadian	Brad Thomson	273	0.44	-0.2	$2,743
Difference		4,124	6.71	-2.29	
Rejected Ballots		298	0.5	-0.1	
Turnout		61,808	71.71	+2.00	
Liberal hold		Swing		+2.29	

2004 Canadian federal election
Party	Candidate	Votes	%	±%	Expenditures
Liberal	David McGuinty	25,956	43.82	-7.5	$74,148
Conservative	Alan Riddell	20,622	34.81	-5.3	$57,520
New Democratic	Monia Mazigh	8,080	13.64	+6.9	$73,230
Green	John Ford	3,398	5.73	n/a	$2,205
Marijuana	John Akpata	495	0.83	-0.5	
Progressive Canadian	Brad Thomson	375	0.63	n/a	$2,743
Independent	Raymond Aubin	225	0.37	n/a	$988
Marxist–Leninist	Saroj Bains	79	0.13	-0.1	
Difference		5,334	8.95	-17.9	
Rejected Ballots		361	0.61	+0.2	
Turnout		59,591	69.67	+7.7	
Liberal hold		Swing		+2.2	

Order of precedence
Preceded by Steven MacKinnon as Member of the Cabinet	Order of Precedence of Canada as Member of the Cabinet	Succeeded by Joanne Thompson as Member of the Cabinet
