= St-Laurent station (Ottawa) =

Transit station in Ottawa, Canada

St-Laurent
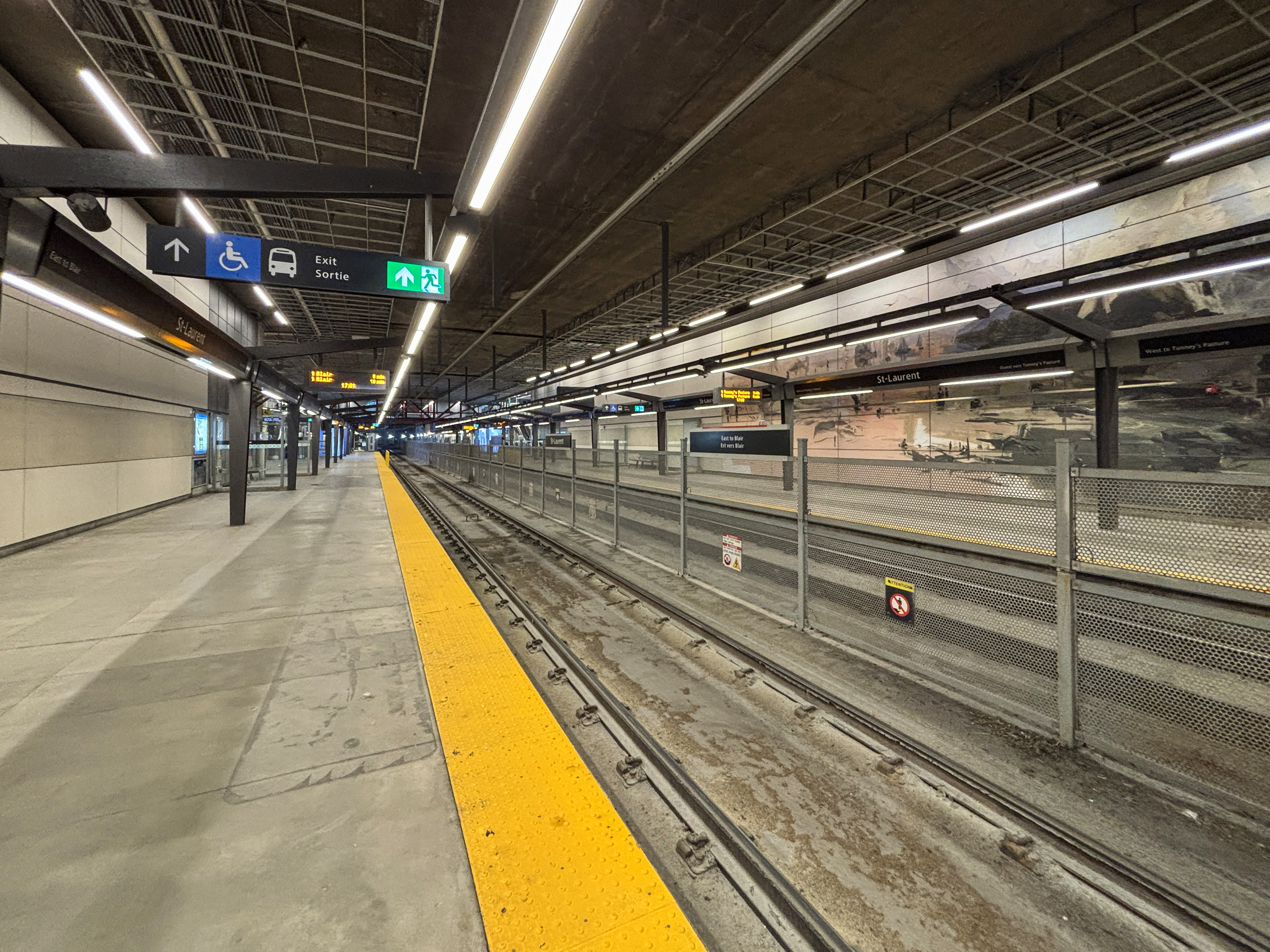

General information
- Location: Ottawa, Ontario; Canada
- Coordinates: 45°25′14″N 75°38′17″W
- Owner: OC Transpo
- Platforms: 2 (LRT), 4 (BRT)
- Tracks: 2
- Connections: FlixBus; Megabus; Rider Express

Construction
- Structure type: Underground
- Parking: No
- Cycle facilities: Yes
- Accessible: Yes

History
- Opened: November 17, 1987 (BRT station); September 14, 2019 (LRT station)
- Rebuilt: 2015–2019

Services
Preceding station	OC Transpo	Following station
Tremblay toward Tunney's Pasture	Line 1	Cyrville toward Blair
Tremblay toward Airport	Route 105	Terminus
Location

St-Laurent station is a station on Line 1 of Ottawa's O-Train, and on the system's bus network and is located at St. Laurent Boulevard and the Queensway.

== Location ==
The station is integrated to its surroundings, with direct indoor pedestrian access to the St. Laurent Shopping Centre. It serves as a major hub for local east end bus routes and has a ticket sales and information office. In addition to serving the shopping centre, it serves numerous commercial and industrial areas in the area and is a major transfer point for east-end commuters, making it one of the busiest stations. An office building occupied in part by ING is also 200 metres west of the station.

== History ==
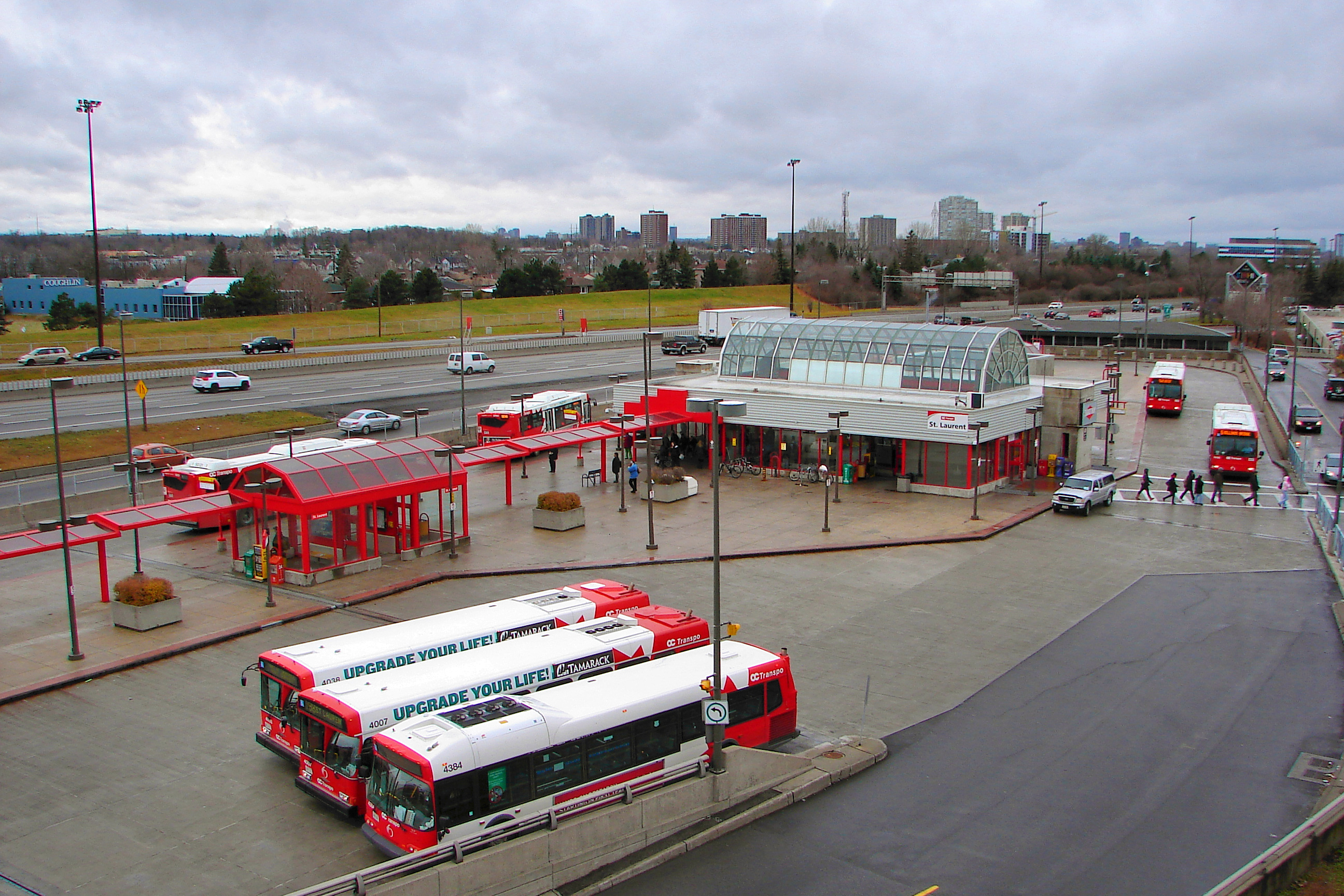
Original transitway station

Originally built as a Transitway station, its construction required the complete reconstruction of the St. Laurent Boulevard / Highway 417 interchange and the construction of a tunnel to allow the transitway to cross underneath the Queensway. Its construction was linked to the last major expansion of the shopping centre in 1987.

On June 28, 2015, the main Transitway platforms closed for Confederation Line construction. The station reopened on September 14, 2019, when Confederation Line service began.

The station has had problems with water leakage and exposed expansion joints since the 2000s. The upper level bus station underwent rehabilitation work in the 2020s, while repairs to the underground portion are scheduled to begin in 2028.

== Layout ==
The rail station has two side platforms and is the only underground station on the Confederation Line outside the downtown section between Lyon and Rideau stations. Ticket barriers are located on the platform level, preventing crossover between the platforms within the fare-paid zone.

Above the platform level, a concourse level provides access to the shopping centre. At ground level, a local bus terminus has been retained from the original Transitway station with minor adjustments and renovations.

The station's artwork consists of an untitled series of large murals by Andrew Morrow, depicting moments in Canadian history.

== Service ==
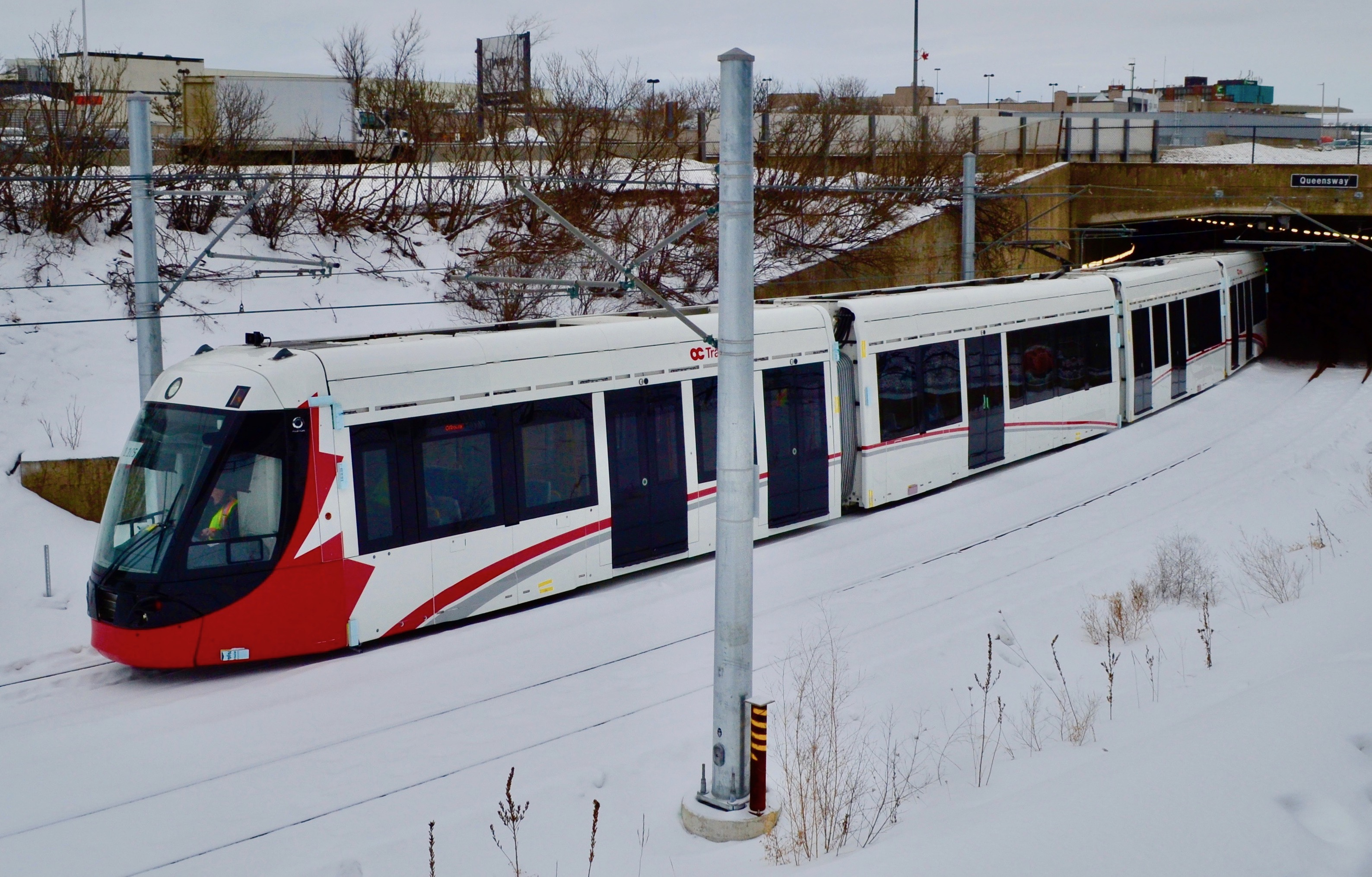
A Confederation Line train exiting the St-Laurent station tunnel in January 2018.

=== OC Transpo ===
The following routes serve St-Laurent station as of August 28th, 2025:

Key
Line 1 (O-Train) Line 2 (O-Train) Line 4 (O-Train)	O-Train
E1	Shuttle Express
R1 R2 R4	O-Train replacement bus routes
N75	Night routes
40 12	Frequent routes
99 162	Local routes
275	Connexion routes
303	Shopper routes
405	Event routes
646	School routes
STO	Société de transport de l'Outaouais routes
Additional info: Line 1: Confederation Line; Line 2: Trillium Line; Line 4: Airport Link; Routes 5 to 199: Custom routing that that connects to Line 1 and/or 2; Routes 200 to 299: Connexion (peak-period only routes that connect to the O-Train); Routes 301 to 305: Shopper Routes (limited rural service); Routes 404 to 406: Canadian Tire Centre events; Routes 450 to 456: Lansdowne Park events; Routes 600 to 699: School Routes; Route R1: replaces Line 1 when it is out of service; Route R2: replaces Line 2 when it is out of service; Route R4: replaces Line 4 when it is out of service; Routes N39 to N98: night service (replaces Line 1 and N98 replaces Line 4); White backgrounds: limited service; Last two digits represent service area: 00s and 10s – Central; 20s – Gloucester; 30s – Orléans; 40s – Ottawa East; 50s – Ottawa West; 60s – Kanata, Stittsville; 70s – Barrhaven; 80s – Nepean; 90s – South Keys

Stop	Routes
East O-Train	Line 1 (O-Train)
West O-Train	Line 1 (O-Train)
A South	40 41 47 105 624 633 302
B Rail Replacement	R1
C Rail Replacement	R1 SHUTTLE/NAVETTE 19 N39 624
D Local	7 14 18 19 20 24

=== Intercity service ===
Following the closure of Ottawa Central Station in 2021, some intercity bus operators use St-Laurent station as a terminus, although others use Ottawa station.

Intercity coaches
Bus Company	Destinations
FlixBus	Montreal, Toronto, London, Niagara Falls, Windsor, Detroit
Megabus	Kingston, Scarborough, Toronto
Rider Express	Toronto, Kingston, Peterborough, Belleville
