= Pimisi station =

Ottawa O-Train light rail station

Pimisi
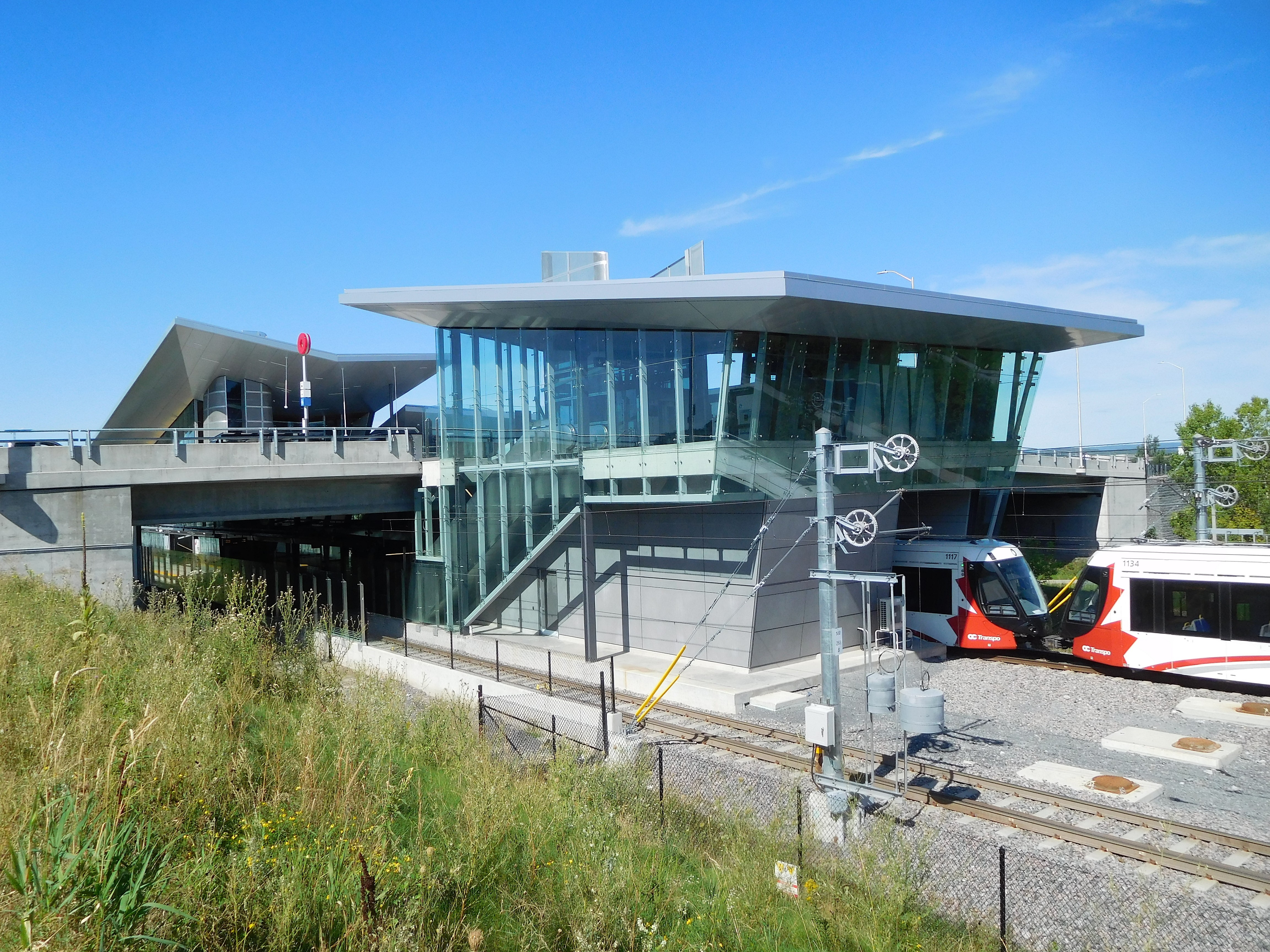

General information
- Location: Booth Street, Ottawa, Ontario; Canada
- Coordinates: 45°24′50″N 75°42′48″W
- Owner: OC Transpo
- Platforms: 2 (O-Train), 2 (bus)
- Tracks: 2

Construction
- Structure type: Underpass
- Cycle facilities: Yes
- Accessible: Yes

History
- Opened: 1983 (Transitway); September 14, 2019 (O-Train)
- Rebuilt: 2015–2019
- Former names: LeBreton

Services
Preceding station	OC Transpo	Following station
Bayview toward Tunney's Pasture	Line 1	Lyon toward Blair
Location

Pimisi Station is a light rail station on Line 1 as part of the O-Train network.

== Location ==
The stop is located under Booth Street in LeBreton Flats. and opened on September 14, 2019. It serves the redeveloped flats area, including the New Central Library, Chinatown, and Little Italy.

== History ==
The Transitway station was originally named LeBreton. By proposal of the local Algonquin leaders it was renamed "Pimisi" (Algonquin: eel) when it was rebuilt to accommodate the O-Train.

== Layout ==
The station features an island platform located at grade. Unusually, the platform level is an intermediate level. Above it, two entrance buildings with entrance barriers are located on either side of Booth Street. Below the platform, a concourse with its own ticket barrier gives access to the green space and plaza north of the station and to Albert Street.

The station features several artworks by Algonquin artists. Nadia Myre's work Eel Spirit, Basket, and Fence is a trilogy consisting of two sculptures (the eel and basket) located in the plaza north of the station, and a series of forest designs on the glass platform walls. The sculpture Algonquin Moose by Simon Brascoupé is also located in the plaza, while another work by him, Algonquin Birch Bark Biting Designs, is located on the glass wall of the entrance on the west side of Booth Street. Finally, Màmawi: Together is a work featuring 100 wooden paddles painted by four Algonquin artists mentored by Brascoupé—Emily Brascoupé-Hoefler, Doreen Stevens, Sherry-Ann Rodgers, and Sylvia Tennisco—as well as Algonquin community members who participated in workshops led by these artists. It is suspended above the platform.

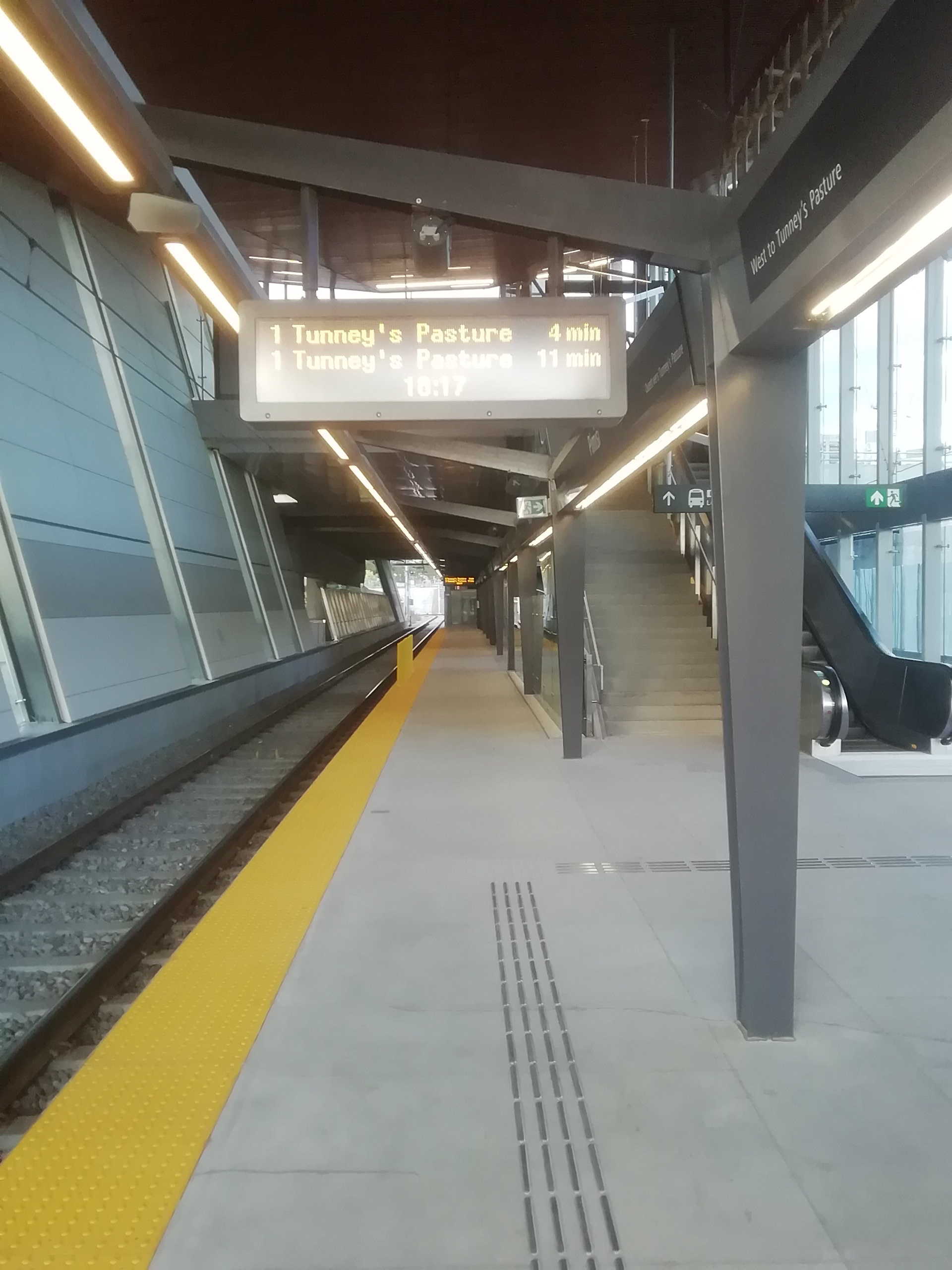
Platform level

== Service ==
The following routes serve Pimisi station as of October 6, 2019:

Key
Line 1 (O-Train) Line 2 (O-Train) Line 4 (O-Train)	O-Train
E1	Shuttle Express
R1 R2 R4	O-Train replacement bus routes
N75	Night routes
40 12	Frequent routes
99 162	Local routes
275	Connexion routes
303	Shopper routes
405	Event routes
646	School routes
STO	Société de transport de l'Outaouais routes
Additional info: Line 1: Confederation Line; Line 2: Trillium Line; Line 4: Airport Link; Routes 5 to 199: Custom routing that that connects to Line 1 and/or 2; Routes 200 to 299: Connexion (peak-period only routes that connect to the O-Train); Routes 301 to 305: Shopper Routes (limited rural service); Routes 404 to 406: Canadian Tire Centre events; Routes 450 to 456: Lansdowne Park events; Routes 600 to 699: School Routes; Route R1: replaces Line 1 when it is out of service; Route R2: replaces Line 2 when it is out of service; Route R4: replaces Line 4 when it is out of service; Routes N39 to N98: night service (replaces Line 1 and N98 replaces Line 4); White backgrounds: limited service; Last two digits represent service area: 00s and 10s – Central; 20s – Gloucester; 30s – Orléans; 40s – Ottawa East; 50s – Ottawa West; 60s – Kanata, Stittsville; 70s – Barrhaven; 80s – Nepean; 90s – South Keys

Stop	Routes
East O-Train	Line 1 (O-Train)
West O-Train	Line 1 (O-Train)
A Booth St. North	8 13
B Booth St. South	8 13
C Albert St. West	R1 12 N57 N61 N63 N75
D Albert St. East	R1 12 N57 N61 N63 N75
