= Line 1 (O-Train) =

Light rail line in Ottawa, Ontario

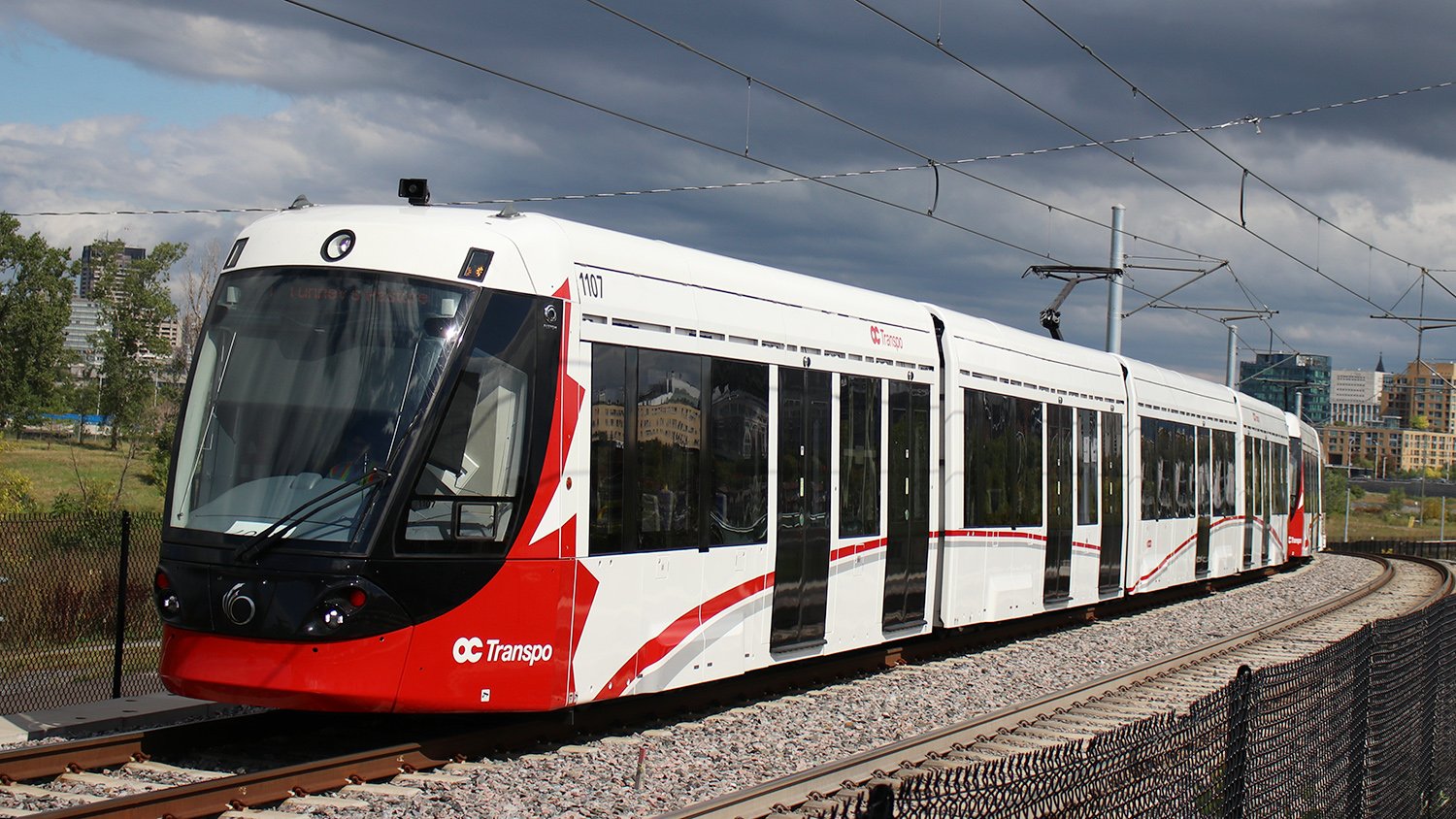
- Alstom Citadis Spirit near Bayview station

Overview
- Other name: Confederation Line
- Owner: City of Ottawa
- Locale: Ottawa, Ontario
- Stations: 13
- Website: Line 1 (OC Transpo)

Service
- Type: Light rail
- System: O-Train
- Route number: 1
- Operator: OC Transpo
- Depot: Belfast Yard
- Rolling stock: Alstom Citadis Spirit

History
- Opened: September 14, 2019; 7 years ago

Technical
- Line length: 12.5 km (7.8 mi)
- Character: Separated, partially underground
- Track gauge: 1,435 mm (4 ft 8 1/2 in) standard gauge
- Electrification: 1,500 V DC from overhead catenary
- Operating speed: 80 km/h (50 mph)
- Signalling: Thales SelTrac CBTC
Route map
Line 1 highlighted in red

Line 1 (French: Ligne 1), formerly known as the Confederation Line (French: Ligne de la Confédération), is a light rail line operated by OC Transpo in Ottawa, Ontario, Canada, part of the city's O-Train system. It opened on September 14, 2019, and is O-Train's second line. It operates on an east–west route, with a segment under Queen Street in the downtown core, complementing the north–south Line 2 that operates to the west of the downtown core.

The project was unanimously approved by the Ottawa City Council on December 19, 2012, with the contract being awarded to Rideau Transit Group. Construction began in 2013, as originally scheduled. At a cost of CA$2.130 billion, the first stage of the line was the largest infrastructure project awarded in the history of the city before being surpassed by the Stage 2 extension of the line, which was projected to cost $4.66 billion.

== History ==
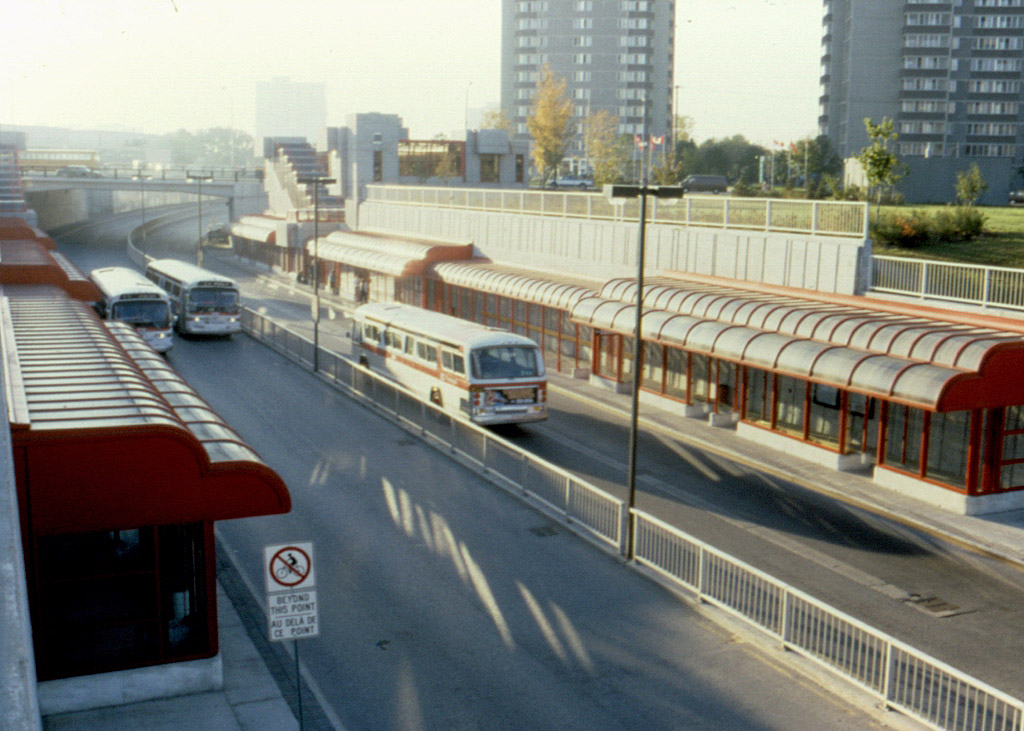
Lees Transitway station

Having had several plans for a metro system already for decades, in 1976 it was decided to start developing a project called Transitway, a bus rapid transit system. The Transitway was intended as a temporary solution in anticipation for urban rail and the first section eventually opened in 1983. As passengers numbers were rising, the decision was made to upgrade parts of the bus system to rail transport.

The Confederation Line rail project was approved unanimously by the city council on December 19, 2012, after many years of debate on a rapid transit network for the city. It represented the initial phase of the network and was awarded as a 30-year design–build–finance–maintain agreement to the Rideau Transit Group. The rolling stock chosen were Alstom Citadis Spirit light rail vehicles.

On February 21, 2014, an 8-metre-wide (26 ft), 12-metre-deep (39 ft) sinkhole opened above the LRT tunnel excavation site at Waller Street south of Laurier Avenue, interrupting electricity, water, sanitation, and storm services in the area, and forced the rerouting of traffic and a temporary halt to LRT tunnelling. Though the cause of the sinkhole was not confirmed, the deputy city manager, Nancy Schepers, said that "monitoring equipment has confirmed that the impact is localized, and the geotechnical team has not identified any safety concerns at this point".

On June 8, 2016, another sinkhole opened, in the middle of Rideau Street near its intersection with Sussex Drive, 25 metres (82 ft) above the LRT tunnel construction, swallowing three lanes of the street and a parked van. The collapse forced evacuation of the Rideau Centre and the closing of a number of local streets and businesses; no one was injured or killed, but the nearly completed tunnel was flooded, submerging a roadheader. Repairs were completed, and the City of Ottawa was cleared of any wrong-doing.

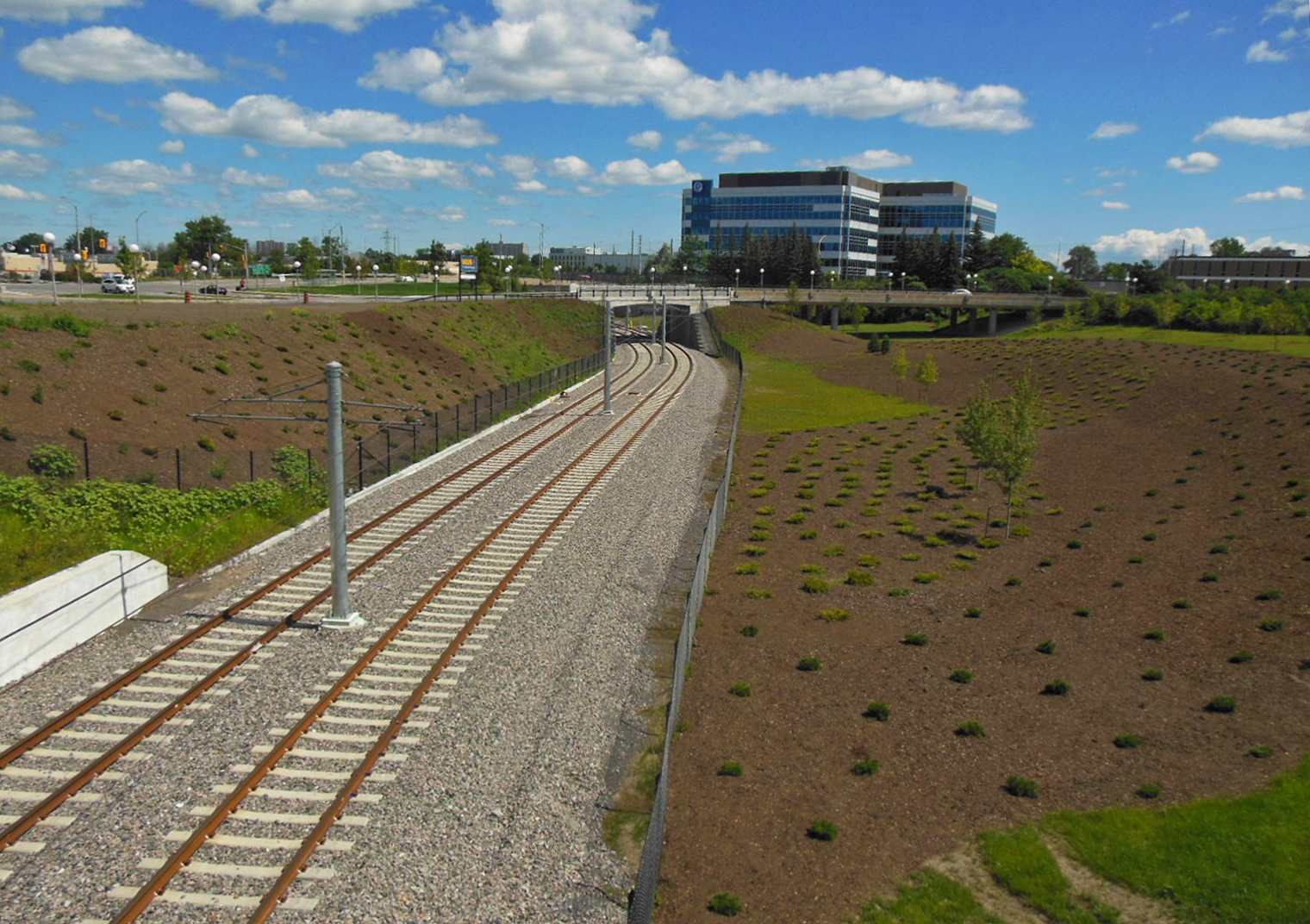
Completed Confederation Line tracks in August 2017

Testing of the line's rolling stock began in late 2016, and was planned to continue through most of the following year before the line was expected to achieve revenue service availability on May 24, 2018, followed by testing, acceptance, and opening of the line to the public. When the May 2018 deadline could not be achieved, it was announced the line would open to the public in November 2018. In September 2018, it was announced that the line would not open in November 2018 and would instead open in early 2019. In March 2019, this was pushed back to sometime between April and June 2019. In May 2019, the opening of the line was again delayed, until the third quarter of 2019, due to concerns about train operations. Rideau Transit Group failed to complete testing and hand over the system by the revised deadline of August 16, 2019, the fourth time RTG had not met a deadline it had revised with the city. OC Transpo announced on August 23, 2019, that the testing had been completed by RTG and the Confederation Line would open to the public on September 14, 2019.

On March 10, 2020, Ottawa City Council issued a notice of default to RTG, listing the flaws and problems with the line and its operation. Among the cited issues were a shortage of trains during rush hour, a maintenance facility fire, inadequate heating of train operator cars, and vehicle parts coming loose, the latter causing damage to transponders.

On November 30, 2022, a public inquiry led by Justice William Hourigan issued a report criticizing both city politicians as well as the Rideau Transit Group consortium for problems in building and implementing the Confederation Line. Hourigan found that project deadlines were unrealistic with unachievable dates, and that information about testing problems was disclosed neither to city council (other than to then-mayor Jim Watson) nor to the public. Hourigan also made 103 recommendations to fix problems, including a recommendation that the province investigate how to develop skills and capabilities to deliver large municipal projects.

== Route and stations ==
Former name and logo of Line 1

=== Route ===
Line 1 runs from Tunney's Pasture station in the west to Blair station in the east, a distance of 12.5 kilometres (7.8 mi) including a 2.5-kilometre (1.6 mi) tunnel running under Queen Street in the central business district, including under the Rideau Canal. The line connects to the existing Transitway at both ends, and to the O-Train Line 2 at Bayview station.

While commonly and officially referred to by OC Transpo as an "electric light-rail service", Line 1 has been described as a "light metro" by some transit experts due to being completely grade-separated and utilizing SelTrac, a communications-based train control technology utilized by many rapid transit systems worldwide. With complete grade separation, travel time from one end to another is less than 25 minutes. Train frequency is every 5 minutes or better during peak hours and every 15 minutes or better after 11 pm (except Sunday). The hours of operation for Line 1 are:

- Monday to Thursday: 5 am to 1 am
- Friday: 5 am to 2 am
- Saturday: 6 am to 2 am
- Sunday: 8 am to 11 pm

=== Stations ===
There are 13 stations in Stage 1 of the project. The three underground stations downtown have 120-metre (390 ft) platforms; the remainder are 90 metres (300 ft) with provisions for future expansion.

All stations display an illuminated red "O" at the entrance. Every station has fare vending machines selling Presto cards, single-ride tickets, day passes, family passes and multi-day passes; vending machines accept cash, debit cards and credit cards. Stations have an information phone as well as emergency phones for those requiring assistance; vending machines also provide a video chat feature. Access through the fare gates to station platforms is via Presto card, U-Pass, STO Multi card, barcoded ticket, barcoded bus transfer, mobile wallet, or bank card. All 13 Stage 1 stations have elevators, and nine have escalators. Station stairways have a channel for passengers to push a bicycle. Four of the 13 stations have public washrooms.

The four major transfer stations—Blair, Hurdman, Bayview, and Tunney's Pasture—have a fare-paid area so that passengers transferring between bus and O-Train, or between lines 1 and 2, do not need to go through fare gates. Tremblay, uOttawa, and Cyrville stations do not have nearby connecting buses. Lyon is the major hub for STO (Société de transport de l'Outaouais) buses connecting with OC Transpo services.

Station	Notes
Blair	Located on the north side of Ottawa Road 174. Connects with the East Transitway to Orleans. Serves the Gloucester City Centre shopping complex.
Cyrville	Transitway station demolished and rebuilt to handle LRT in 2015. Serves the Ottawa CANEX (for military personnel and families).
St-Laurent	Integrates with the St. Laurent Shopping Centre and connects to east end bus routes
Tremblay	Connects with Via Rail inter-regional services at Ottawa station. A pedestrian bridge connects to Ottawa Stadium north of the Queensway.
Hurdman	Connects to the Southeast Transitway to south Ottawa
Lees	Serves existing high-density residential buildings and the University of Ottawa Lees Campus.
uOttawa	Serves the University of Ottawa and the Sandy Hill district. Replaces the previous Campus station.
Rideau	Located under Rideau Street and integrated with the Rideau Centre. Replaces the existing Mackenzie King station and is a major transfer station, providing transfers between Line 1 and the city's urban bus routes to the east (Montreal Road) and south (Bank Street). Serves the ByWard Market and Lower Town districts.
Parliament	Located under Queen Street, replacing the Bank and Metcalfe stations. Connects to the Sun Life Centre and Heritage Place. Serves the northeast area of downtown, including Parliament Hill.
Lyon	Located under Queen Street, replacing the Bay and Kent stations. Integrated with Place de Ville's underground concourse and a future Claridge residential development. Serves the northwest area of downtown
Pimisi	Located in LeBreton Flats under the Booth Street bridge. Connects with Gatineau buses. Serves the Chinatown district, and is a short walk from Little Italy.
Bayview	Connects with the north–south Line 2 to south Ottawa. Serves the east end of the Hintonburg district and the west end of Chinatown.
Tunney's Pasture	Connects with the West Transitway towards Barrhaven and Kanata. Serves the Wellington Street West district, including the western part of Hintonburg, and the Tunney's Pasture federal government complex.

==== Design issues ====
Station design concerns have been raised; shortcomings identified include steps that are slippery when wet, which have resulted in passenger injuries.

=== Future stations ===
Station	Notes
Stage 2 East
Montréal	Will replace existing at-grade Transitway request stops and be built across Montreal Road in a newly constructed and widened Ottawa Road 174 overpass
Jeanne d'Arc	Will replace the existing station and be built in the median of Ottawa Road 174 below Jeanne d'Arc Boulevard
Convent Glen	New station will be built in the median of 174 below Orléans Boulevard
Place d'Orléans	Will replace existing Transitway station and be built in the median of 174 and connect to the existing pedestrian bridge to connect to the Park and Ride and the Place d'Orleans Shopping Centre. This will be a major transfer station for riders living in Orléans and it will include a fare-paid transfer zone, with an additional pedestrian overpass constructed to provide direct between the bus and train platforms in the zone. It will also include public washrooms.
Trim	Will be located in the median of 174 and connect to the existing park-and-ride south of 174 via a new pedestrian bridge. In the longer term, there are plans to construct an additional pedestrian bridge to link the station with the communities north of 174.
Stage 2 West
Westboro	Will replace the existing Transitway station. Serves high-density residential and Westboro Village
Kichi Zìbì	Will replace the existing Dominion transitway station. The station will be named after the original Algonquin name of the nearby Ottawa River: Kichi Zìbì, meaning "great river".
Sherbourne	New station will be below-grade, built as part of a cut-and-cover tunnel along the Byron Linear Tramway Park at Sherbourne Road
New Orchard	New station will be below-grade, built as part of a cut-and-cover tunnel along the Byron Linear Tramway Park near New Orchard Avenue
Lincoln Fields	Will replace the existing Transitway station. This station will be a major transfer point between Lines 1 and 3. It will include a fare-paid transfer zone as well as public washrooms. It will be the only O-Train station with three train platforms.
Iris	Will replace the existing Transitway station
Algonquin	Will replace the existing Baseline Transitway station. The station will be renamed to Algonquin after the nearby Algonquin College campus. It will be the south-westernmost terminus of Line 1, and will include a fare-paid transfer zone as well as public washrooms. An elevated pedestrian bridge is also being constructed to link the main station building with the second floor of Algonquin College's ACCE Building.
Queensview	Will replace the existing Queensway Transitway station 1 kilometer away. Will include a pedestrian bridge to cross over Highway 417 between Baxter Road and Queensview Drive
Pinecrest	Will replace the existing Transitway station
Bayshore	Will replace part of the existing Transitway station. The local bus platforms, shelters, and bus loop area will be refurbished and preserved, with a new entry building on the north side of the station with fare gates to facilitate the creation of a complete fare paid zone.
Moodie	Will replace existing at-grade Transitway stops and be situated on the northeast side of the Moodie Drive / Highway 417 interchange. Will serve as the westernmost terminus of Line 3.

=== Long-term expansion plans ===
Station	Notes
Gloucester High School / Trillium Park	A future side platform station is protected in the vicinity of Gloucester High School and Trillium Park, just east of Blair station. This would serve nearby residential communities as well as provide a more direct link to the newly built shopping centre which includes a Costco Wholesale.
Orléans Town Centre	A future side platform station is protected in the vicinity of the Orléans Centrum shopping district. It would be located in the median of Regional Road 174 and would include some form of pedestrian bridge connecting the station with the surrounding communities across the 174.
Tenth Line Road	A future side platform station is protected at Tenth Line Road. It would be located in the median of Regional Road 174 underneath the Tenth Line Road overpass, not dissimilar in nature to Stage 2 East's Jeanne d'Arc and Convent Glen stations.

== Rolling stock ==
The winning consortium for the project, RTG, awarded Alstom a contract to provide 34 Citadis Spirit LRVs. It was the company's first order for modern light rail vehicles in North America, competing directly with similar models such as the Siemens S70 (which was originally ordered for the original extension plan for the Trillium Line but was later cancelled). Derived from the earlier Citadis Dualis tram-train used in Europe, they were manufactured in Alstom's plant in Hornell, New York, with final assembly taking place at Belfast Yard in Ottawa. The top speed of the vehicles is 105 kilometres per hour (65 mph), though the operating speed on the urban parts of the line are 80 kilometres per hour (50 mph).

Signalling on the line is handled by Thales' SelTrac semi-automatic communication-based train control (CBTC) technology.

As part of a contest organized by OC Transpo, each train set (on both the Confederation and Trillium lines) was given a name that relates to local or Canadian history.

An additional 38 Citadis Spirit vehicles were ordered by the city as part of the Stage 2 extension project with assembly beginning in early 2019. Originally all 38 vehicles were to be assembled in Ottawa like the original order; however, in July 2019 Alstom announced it would move the assembly of the last 25 vehicles from this order to their new plant in Brampton. As of July 2021, five of these vehicles had already been added to the operational revenue service fleet with several others in various stages of production and acceptance; most recent numbers also include 7 in line testing and 11 waiting for line testing. Each of the 38 additional vehicles will be added to the active Confederation Line fleet as they are completed.

=== Vehicle issues ===
The system encountered expected problems during testing with the train set during winter storms during early testing, including heating systems failing to work, communications systems failing, and body work on cars dropping off.

Following the transition to full LRT service, in early October 2019 the automated doors of the Spirit vehicles experienced numerous faults if pried open or held back by passengers. This resulted in service disruptions lasting up to 90 minutes due to a lack of proper procedures to isolate and disable the faulty doors while a train was in service. The vehicles also began encountering integration issues with Thales' SelTrac train control system that would lead to the on-board computer for some trains in service needing to be rebooted, causing delays of up to 20–30 minutes. Passengers also took issue with the overhead grab bars being too high to reach and that there were no straps to hold on to, with some resorting to scarves wrapped around bars or other means to stabilize themselves during travel. OC Transpo subsequently ordered and installed straps on all trains. Because the original design of the vehicles did not include straps, RTG quoted the cost of procuring and installing them to be $1 million which OC Transpo rejected. OC Transpo said that by delaying the installation of the straps to after the line had launched, they only had to pay $200,000.

Although vehicle reliability improved later into 2019, a series of new reliability issues began starting on December 31, 2019, when two trains failed due to electrical failures caused by improperly cleaned electrical contacts and led to disruptions that lasted several hours. Throughout the start of 2020 the system's reliability issues continued with switch failures and continued unreliability of the vehicles. Insufficient heat generated by switch heaters would cause switches on the line to fail in heavy snowfall. Though the issue with the switch heaters had been flagged as a deficiency several times, the solutions implemented by RTG prior to the launch of the line were not effective at resolving the issue. Issues with the vehicles ranged from electrical failures occurring in inclement weather caused by manufacturing defects in the inductors that feed power into the vehicles, to brake faults, and flat spots becoming a common occurrence on vehicles causing many to need to be taken out of service. RTG struggled to keep up with the maintenance of the vehicles leading to several weeks where only a reduced number of trains could be operated during peak periods. On January 30, 2020, the Confederation Line reached an operational low when it was short five trains during rush hour due to "recurring mechanical and electrical issues". The Confederation Line was expected to field 15 working trains during rush hour, although it only operated 13 vehicles at once during peak periods due to the system requiring more spares than originally thought. The city expected to be able to operate with 15 trains at peak by the end of August 2020 as additional vehicles were completed for Stage 2 and added to the fleet, and on August 7, 2020, 15 trains were launched for peak service without issue.

Due to the unreliability of the system, the city has exercised its right to withhold the monthly maintenance payments it owes to RTG, which RTG disputes. An exception was the payment for September 2019, which the city was contractually obligated to pay regardless of the service provided.

=== Belfast Yard ===
An ultimate capacity of 66 LRVs (most recent numbers show 57 LRVs having been delivered to the yard, 34 Stage 1, 5 Stage 2 joining the revenue service fleet, 7 Stage 2 in line test, 11 Stage 2 waiting for line testing, and the remaining 15 Stage 2 yet to be delivered) will be stored at the Belfast Yard at 805 Belfast Road, with connecting track to Line 1; a further capacity up to 90 LRVs would be stored at the Moodie Yard. Part of the 6.5-hectare (16-acre) site was an existing OC Transpo facility. The yard site was created by combining this facility with the properties of a number of private business. All existing structures were demolished in 2013, and the new facilities were completed in 2016. The facility has a storage shed, maintenance facilities and an administration office. Final assembly for many of the LRVs was completed here.

== Accidents and incidents ==
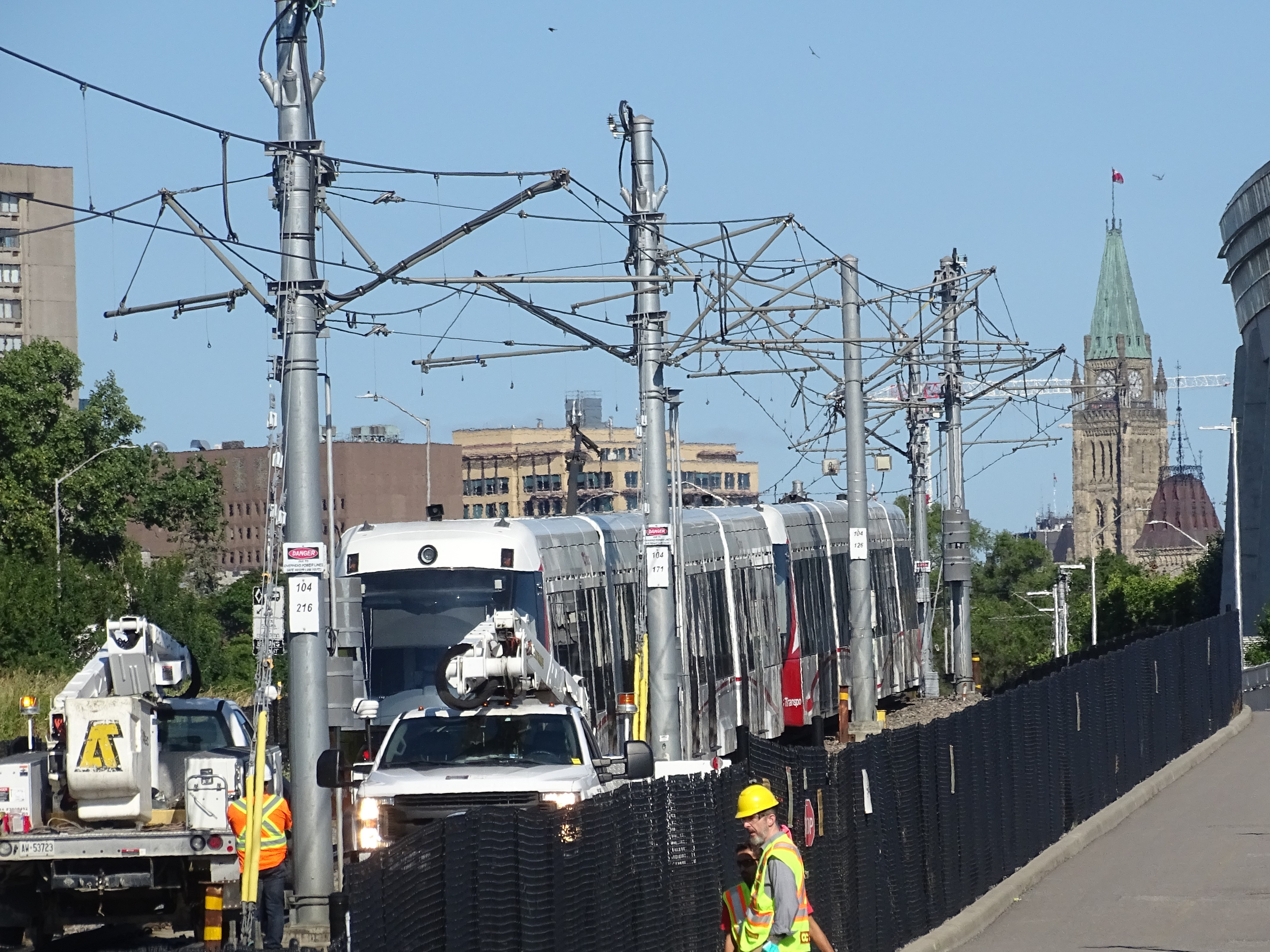
Repairs being done to the catenary system following a July 2022 lightning strike

- August 8, 2021 – An empty train derailed while switching tracks after leaving Tunney's Pasture after one of the ten axles derailed. There were no injuries. Technicians believe the derailment was caused by a loose connection of a wheel to its axle leading to excessive wear and eventual failure. An inspection of the fleet showed that nine other vehicles had the same problem.
- September 19, 2021 – A train with passengers derailed before entering Tremblay station after two axles became dislodged from the second car. After leaving Tremblay station in a derailed state, the train increased speed to about 35 kilometres per hour (22 mph), crossed a bridge over Riverside Drive, struck a signal mast and switch heater, and finally came to a stop between Tremblay station and Hurdman station using train-initiated emergency braking. There were no injuries. An improperly torqued bolt on the train's gearbox was identified as the cause of the derailment. Service was partially resumed on November 12, 2021, with full service expected to resume by the end of November.
- July 24, 2022 – At approximately 11:15 pm, lightning struck the overhead catenary system, downing 900 metres (3,000 ft) of cable near Lees station. Train service between Rideau and St. Laurent stations was interrupted for four and a half days.
- July 17, 2023 – After an issue with an axle bearing on an LRV was discovered, the entire Confederation Line was shut down for nearly a month as the entire fleet underwent an emergency inspection. Single car service returned to the line on August 14, 2023, with a supplementary shuttle service to handle additional traffic.
- January 22, 2026 — Issues with cartridge bearing assemblies on LRV's forced OC Transpo to pull all trains with more than 100,000 kilometres travelled out of service. From January 22, single car service has been running at all times, leading to problems with overcrowding on trains at peak hours. A mix of single and double car trains began servicing the line on May 14, and double car service returned on June 8.
- March 11, 2026 — OC Transpo temporarily suspended service east of uOttawa station following a severe ice storm which lead to “arcing” issues as LRV pantographs came detached from overhead wires. Service resumed on March 14.

== Construction ==
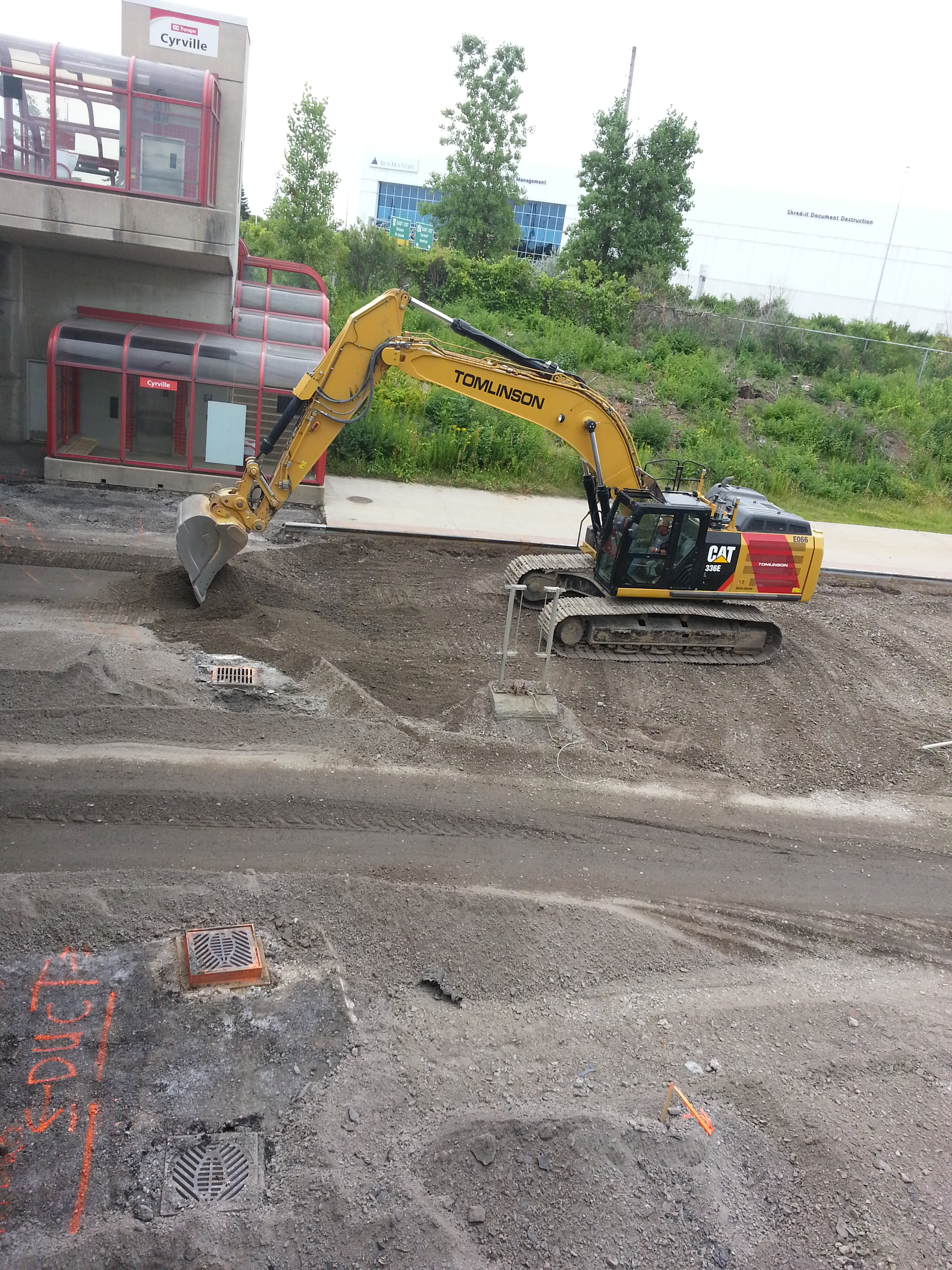
Demolition work at the Cyrville station (July 2015)

In mid-April 2015, OC Transpo posted a list of bus route changes as a result of the closure of the Transitway between Hurdman station and Blair station. As a result of the closure, many new routes were created, such as route 91, and existing routes modified, most notably routes 61, 62, 94 and 95. Many routes used bus-only lanes on Highway 417, and several others were altered or shortened to avoid serving the construction area. The changes were meant to provide extra service to those in areas affected by the Transitway closure, and to avoid as many delays as possible while construction on the Confederation Line progressed. A side project on the 417 highway was completed in 2016.

== Stage 2 ==
Stage 2 LRT logo

In November 2013, the City of Ottawa released its new transportation master plan, which included plans to build 35 kilometres (22 mi) of new rapid transit and 19 new stations. This also included plans to extend the Confederation Line westward to Baseline station, and eastward to Place d'Orleans station. In July 2015, the city released a functional report on the Stage 2 system expansion, which added plans to extend the Confederation Line eastward from Place d'Orleans station to Trim station. This totals an extension of 11 stations, 15 kilometres (9.3 mi) westward and 5 stations, 12 kilometres (7.5 mi) eastward. Stage 2 will add a new light maintenance and storage facility along Corkstown Road, west of Moodie station, Line 3's western terminus.

Construction began in the second quarter of 2019, as the initial line became operational. While the expansion was initially expected to be complete by 2026, the city stated in August 2024 that the full system could be operational by 2027, with the east extension to Trim operational by 2025. The city later stated that the east extension could open as early as the first quarter of 2026. Construction is currently ongoing, for implementation of the city's plan to address the current gap in service between Dominion station and Lincoln Fields station where buses travel on the Kichi Zibi Mikan a little over 4 kilometres (2.5 mi) without stopping. The plan calls for burying trains for most of the route, creating a shorter, straighter alignment. The new route will also include two new LRT stations in an urban area with intensification opportunities.

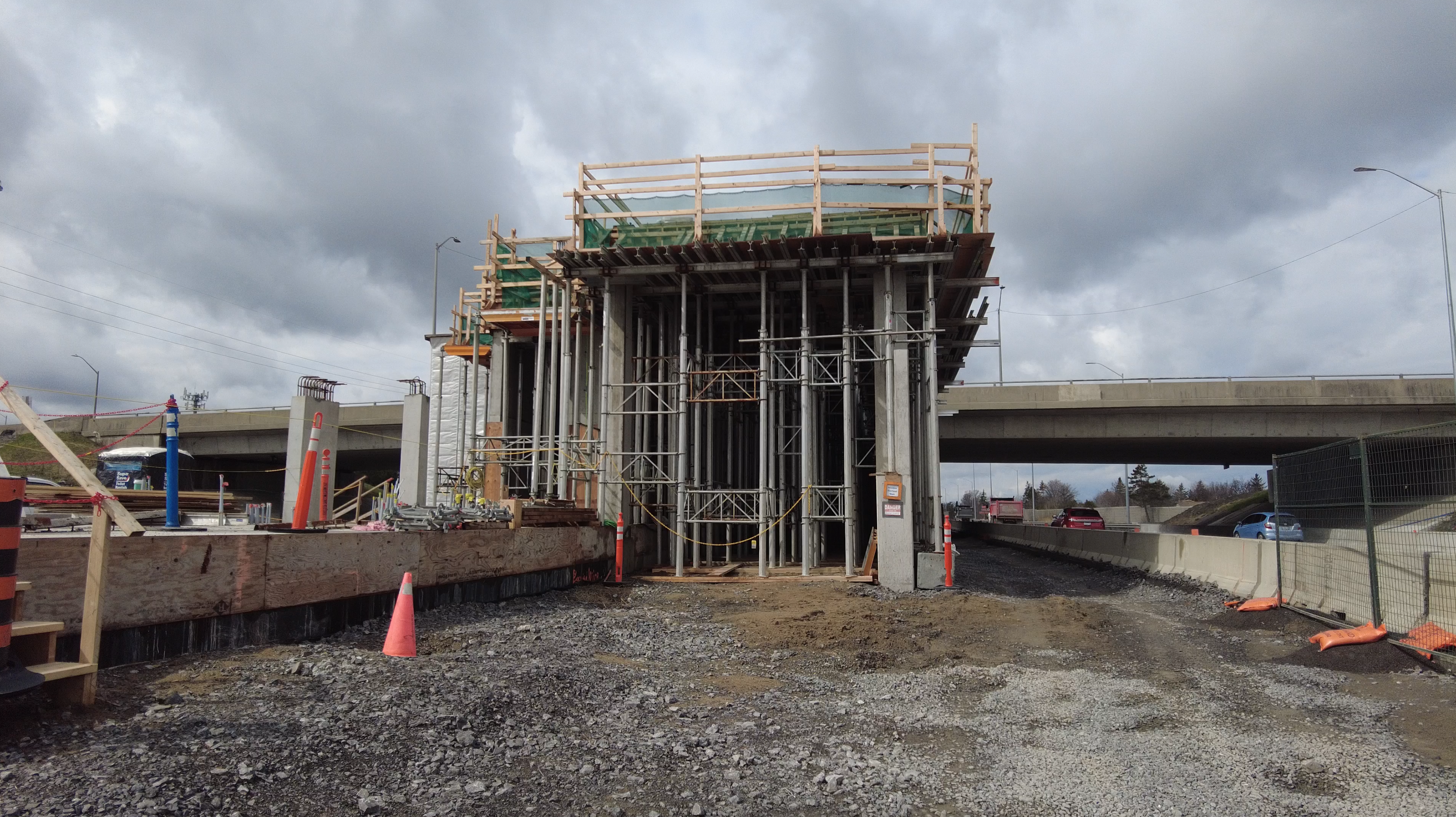
Construction of Jeanne d'Arc Station – April 2022

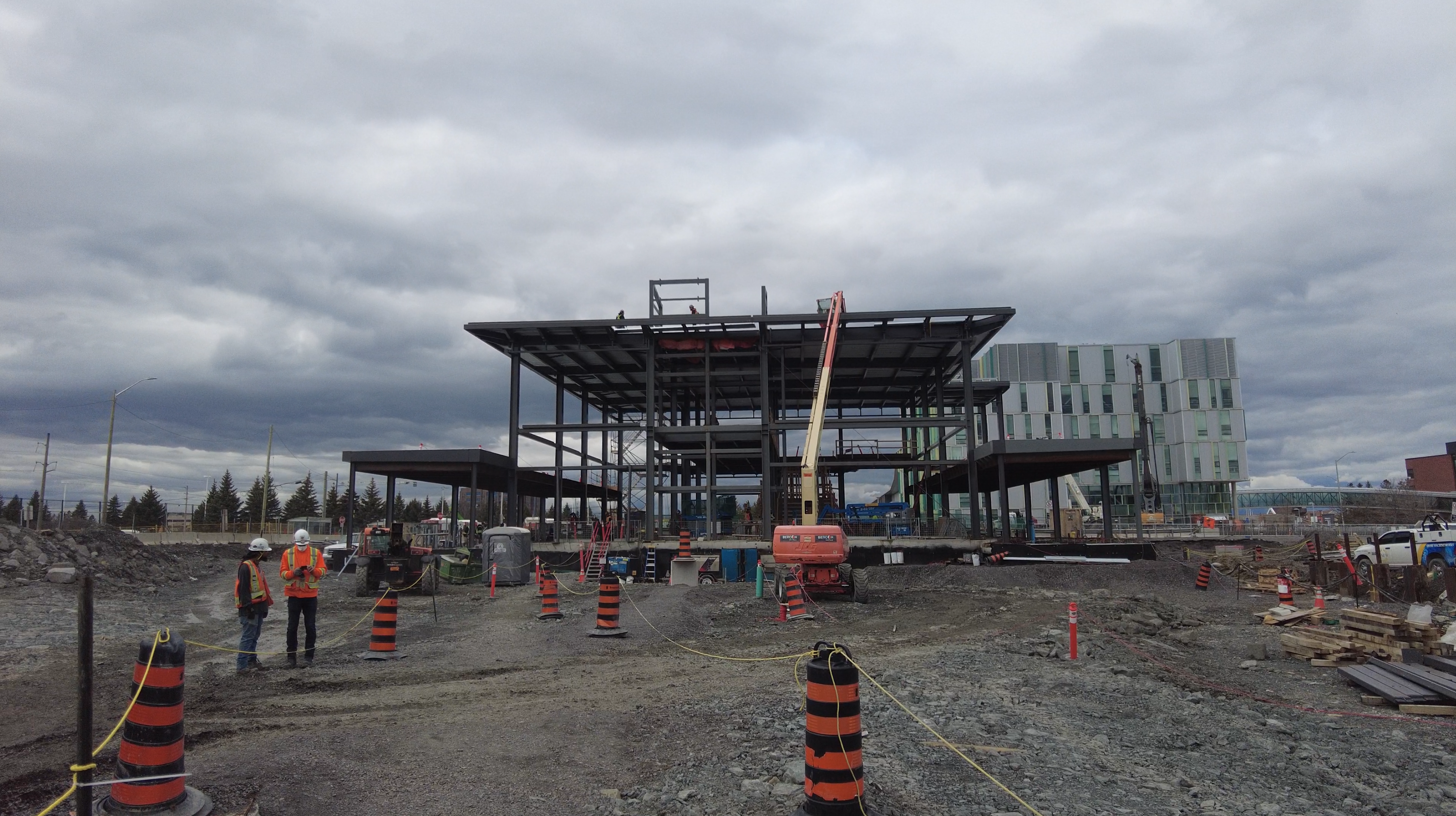
Construction of Algonquin Station – April 2022

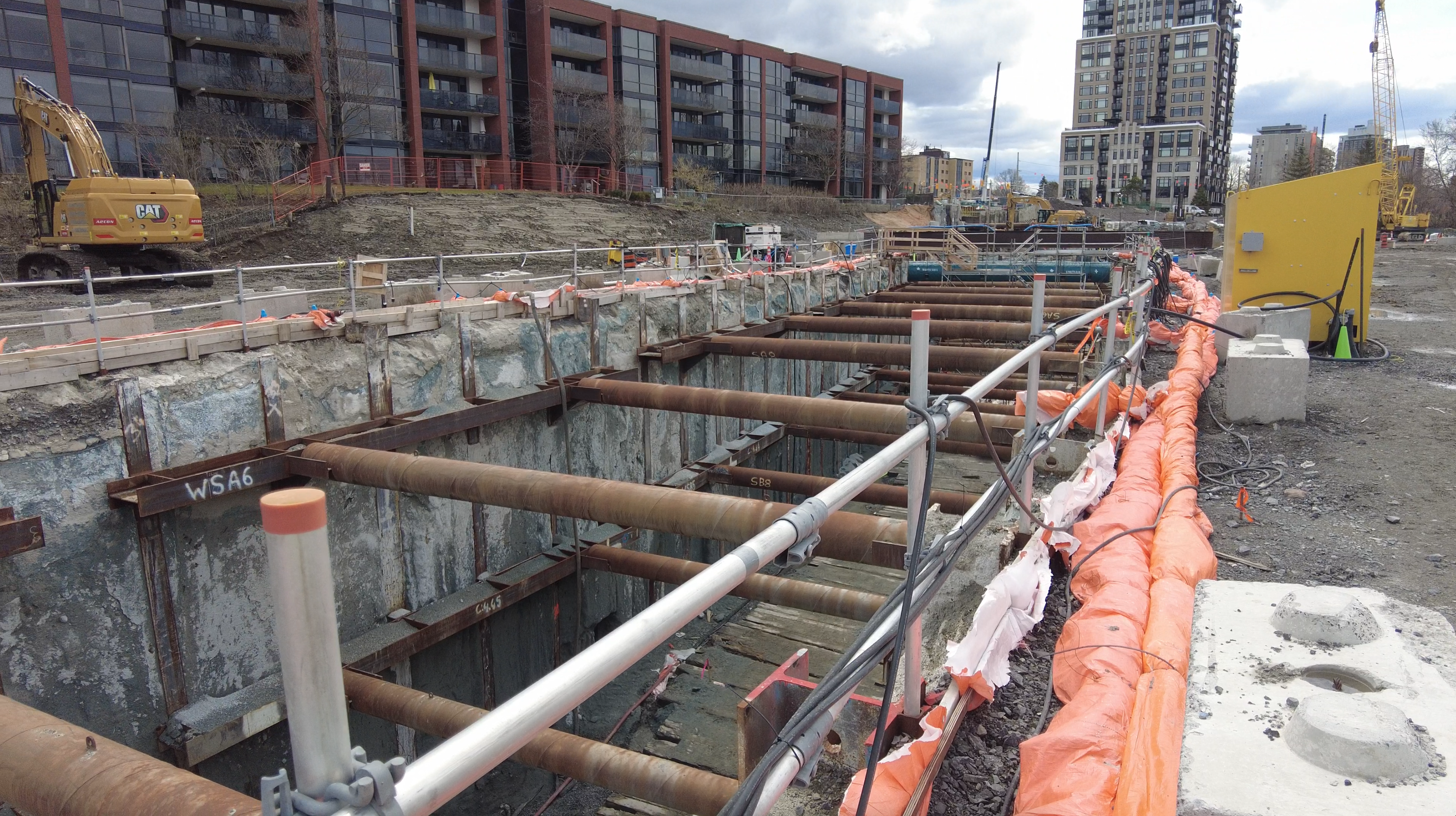
Construction of Cut & Cover Tunnel – April 2022

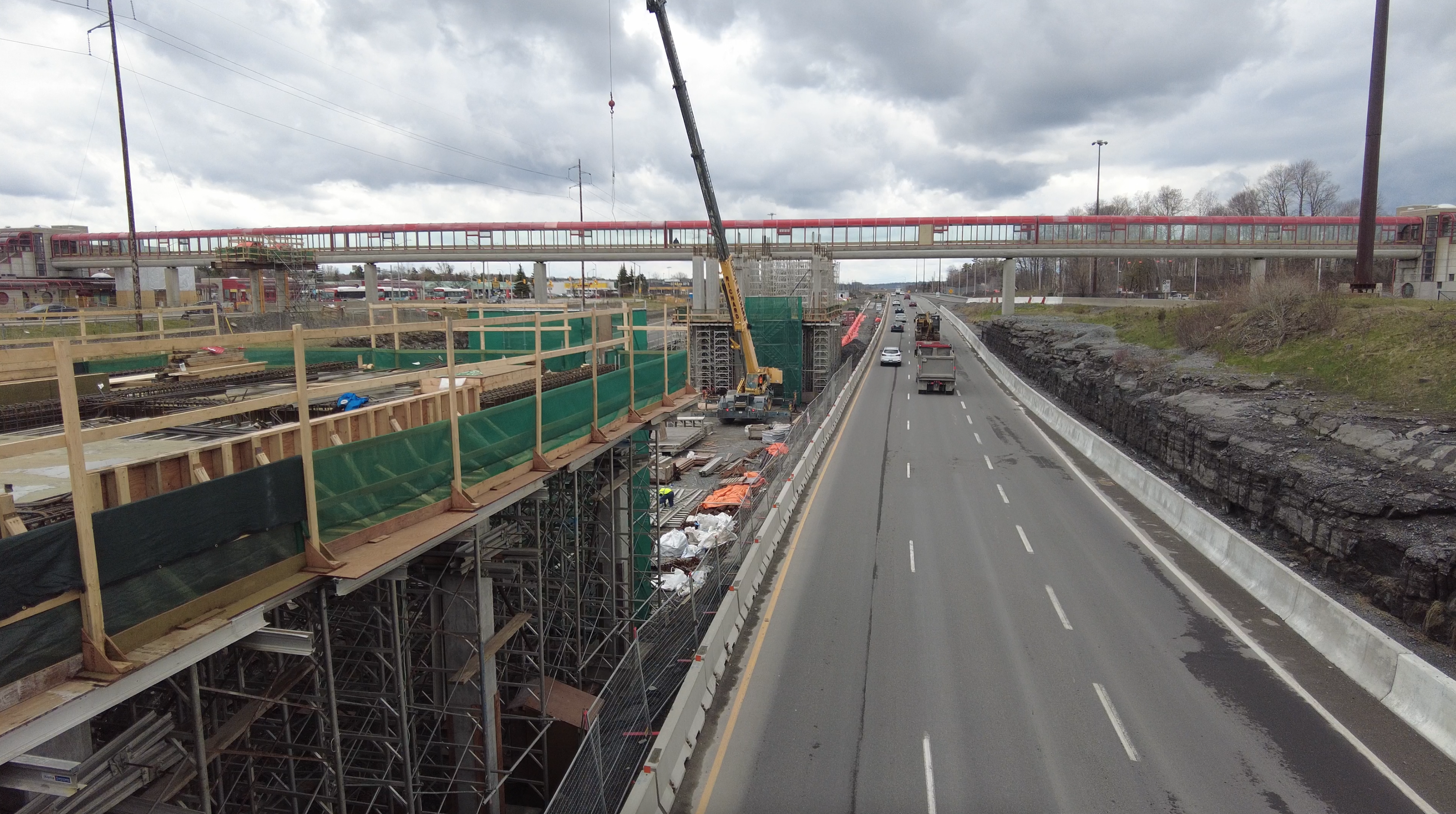
Construction of Place d'Orléans Station – April 2022

== See also ==
- Urban rail transit in Canada
