= UOttawa station =

Transit station in Ottawa, Canada

uOttawa
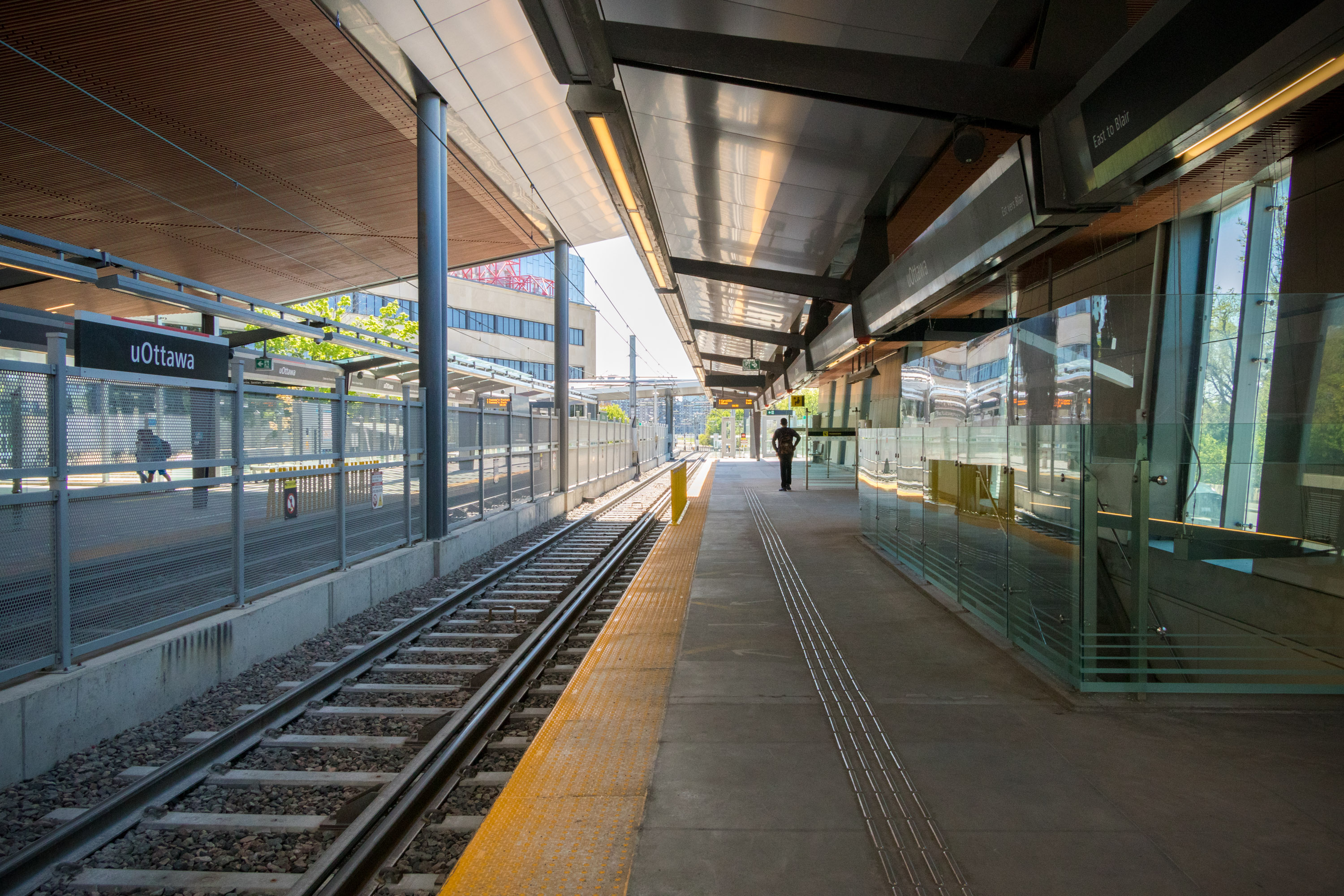

General information
- Location: Ottawa, Ontario; Canada
- Coordinates: 45°25′14″N 75°40′56″W
- Owner: OC Transpo
- Platforms: Side platforms
- Tracks: 2

Construction
- Structure type: Surface
- Parking: No
- Cycle facilities: Yes
- Accessible: Yes

History
- Opened: September 14, 2019

Services
Preceding station	OC Transpo	Following station
Rideau toward Tunney's Pasture	Line 1	Lees toward Blair
Location

uOttawa station is a light rail station on the O-Train Line 1, located on the University of Ottawa campus.

== Location ==
Located just east of the Rideau Canal at the western terminus of Somerset Street East, the station services the University of Ottawa's southern section and the Sandy Hill neighbourhood. A pedestrian and bicycle tunnel runs under the station, linking the university with paths along the canal.

== History ==
uOttawa station replaces Campus station and the nearby Laurier station, which were bus rapid transit (BRT) stations on Ottawa's Transitway that served the University of Ottawa.

Campus station was the easternmost bus station located within Ottawa's downtown core, serving mainly as a drop-off and pickup for pedestrians, especially university students and staff. Laurier station, as its name suggests, was located at the Laurier Avenue East and Waller intersection, serving the Desmarais Building for the Telfer School of Management and the Faculty of Arts.

The Corktown Footbridge over the Rideau Canal was opened in September 2006 to link the Campus station to the Golden Triangle neighbourhood east of Elgin Street.

The station became an O-Train station on the Confederation Line starting on September 14, 2019, and it was renamed uOttawa.

== Layout ==
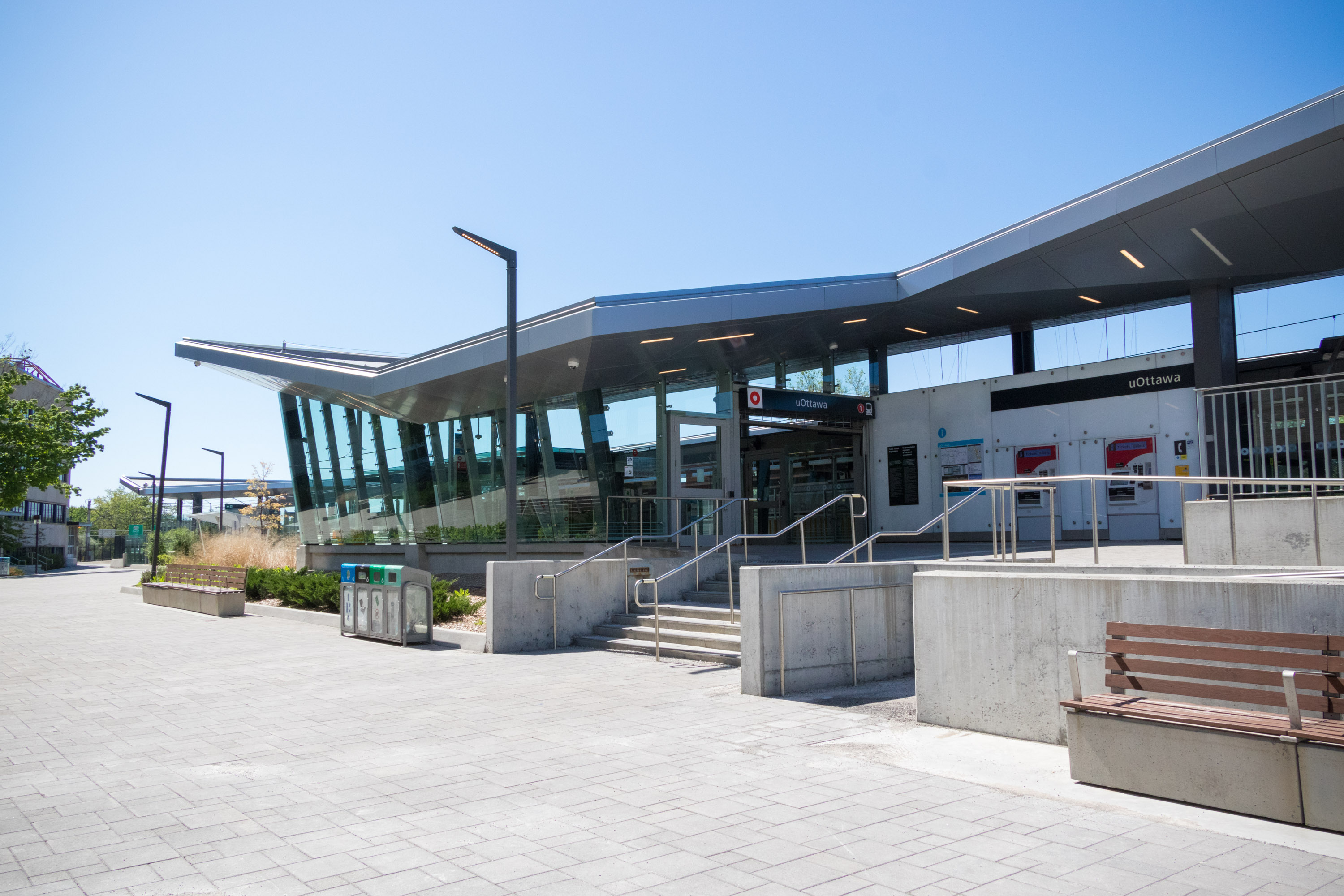
uOttawa station exterior

uOttawa station is an at-grade side platform station. One entrance is located at platform level on the northeastern (westbound) side of the station; another is located in the station's underground concourse, which opens onto the public pedestrian and bicycle tunnel. The bicycle tunnel emerges as a large S-curve just north of the station.

The station has two artworks. One, Train of Thought by Derek Michael Besant, is a series of portraits located in the pedestrian/cycle tunnel, whose appearance shifts as one walks past them. The other, Sphere Field by Kenneth Emig, is a sculpture of a mirrored sphere in a glass case, and is located on the plaza just to the north of the station.

== Service ==
The following routes serve uOttawa as of October 6, 2019:

Key
Line 1 (O-Train) Line 2 (O-Train) Line 4 (O-Train)	O-Train
E1	Shuttle Express
R1 R2 R4	O-Train replacement bus routes
N75	Night routes
40 12	Frequent routes
99 162	Local routes
275	Connexion routes
303	Shopper routes
405	Event routes
646	School routes
STO	Société de transport de l'Outaouais routes
Additional info: Line 1: Confederation Line; Line 2: Trillium Line; Line 4: Airport Link; Routes 5 to 199: Custom routing that that connects to Line 1 and/or 2; Routes 200 to 299: Connexion (peak-period only routes that connect to the O-Train); Routes 301 to 305: Shopper Routes (limited rural service); Routes 404 to 406: Canadian Tire Centre events; Routes 450 to 456: Lansdowne Park events; Routes 600 to 699: School Routes; Route R1: replaces Line 1 when it is out of service; Route R2: replaces Line 2 when it is out of service; Route R4: replaces Line 4 when it is out of service; Routes N39 to N98: night service (replaces Line 1 and N98 replaces Line 4); White backgrounds: limited service; Last two digits represent service area: 00s and 10s – Central; 20s – Gloucester; 30s – Orléans; 40s – Ottawa East; 50s – Ottawa West; 60s – Kanata, Stittsville; 70s – Barrhaven; 80s – Nepean; 90s – South Keys

Stop	Routes
West O-Train	Line 1 (O-Train)
East O-Train	Line 1 (O-Train)
A King Edward South and Templeton	N39 N45 56 N105 R1
B King Edward North and Templeton	N39 N45 56 N105 R1

=== Notes ===
- Route 10 is available nearby at the corner of Somerset Street East and King Edward Avenue.
- Route 56 serves this station during peak hours on weekdays but serves this station all day on weekends.
