= Lees Avenue =

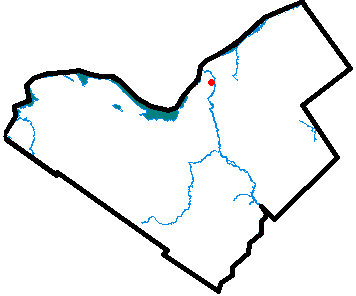

Lees Avenue is both a road and a neighbourhood in Ottawa, Ontario, Canada. The area lies in the narrow stretch between the Rideau Canal and Rideau River south of Sandy Hill and the Queensway and is part of Old Ottawa East. The neighbourhood is dominated by five large apartment buildings, some of the largest in Ottawa. These buildings range from low cost to moderate cost and mostly house new immigrants, students and young professionals. Across the Rideau River to the east Hurdman is a more recently built such area.

Prior to Ottawa East's annexation in 1907, Lees was known as William Street. Originally the area was an industrial zone lying beside the train tracks. In the 1950s, the tracks were removed and replaced by the Queensway. The industry also left the area and new towers began to be built. The Eastern Ontario Institute of Technology, (later to merge with The Ontario Vocational Centre and renamed Algonquin College), opened its new Rideau Campus there in 1964. The Ottawa architecture firm of Burgess, McLean & MacPhadyen designed a single level brick, concrete and steel building composed of three connected wings on a 12-acre city-owned Lees Avenue site. After being unused for a number of years, it was sold to the University of Ottawa in January 2007. The neighbourhood remained home to the Canadian military's Lees Avenue Armoury until the late 1980s.

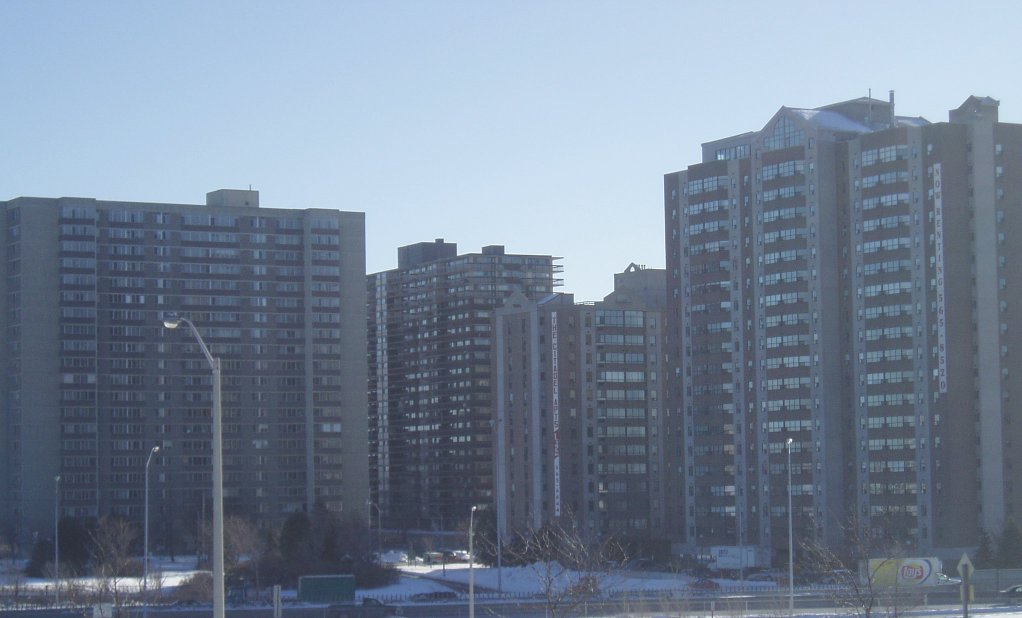
Lees Avenue seen from Sandy Hill Heights.

In 1986 while building the Lees Transitway Station the area's industrial past began to cause major problems as it was discovered that large, and leaking, tanks of coal tar sat under the area. For some 35 years up to 1957, the Ottawa Gas Works had operated a coal gasification plant in the area and had produced this byproduct. This began many months long arguments with the various levels of government, the landowners, and the residents. Eventually, a major cleaning operation was launched costing some $12 million.

The current road of Lees Avenue runs from Main Street in the west to where it crosses over the Queensway when it becomes King Edward Avenue. It is a moderately used collector road serving the local community. Lees originally turned into Chapel Street but was realigned in 1993 to turn into King Edward. The original Lees Ave cross over the train tracks (now Queensway) went straight to the edge of the Rideau River. Although just like other streets during the construction of the Queensway. Originally it got split and the northern part of Lees Ave could be accessed via Robinson Ave. As of April 10, 2017 the northern section was renamed to Robinson Ave.

== See also ==
- List of Ottawa neighbourhoods
