= Lees station =

Transit station in Ottawa, Canada

Lees
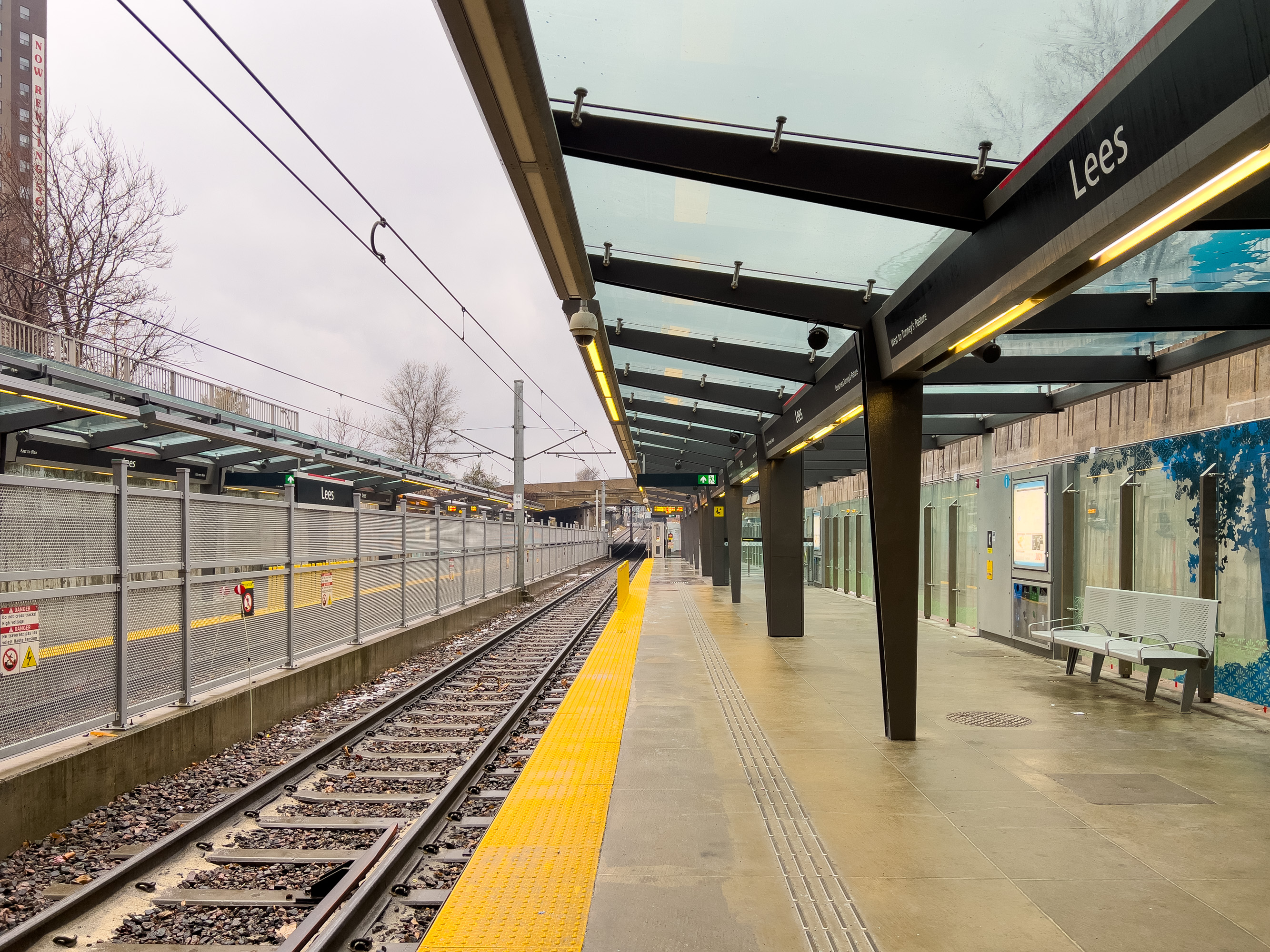
- Lees Station LRT platform

General information
- Coordinates: 45°24′59″N 75°40′13″W
- Owner: OC Transpo
- Platforms: 2 (O-Train), 2 (Bus)
- Tracks: 2

Construction
- Structure type: Trench (LRT station)
- Platform levels: 2
- Parking: No
- Cycle facilities: Yes
- Accessible: Yes

Other information
- Station code: 3022

History
- Opened: 1983 (Transitway); September 14, 2019 (O-Train)
- Closed: December 20, 2015 (Lower/transitway level only)
- Rebuilt: 2015–2019

Services
Preceding station	OC Transpo	Following station
uOttawa toward Tunney's Pasture	Line 1	Hurdman toward Blair
Location

Lees station is an OC Transpo light rail station in Ottawa, Ontario, Canada. It had previously been a Transitway station, which closed in January 2016 and was converted into an O-Train station.

== Location ==
It is located south of the Highway 417 just to the west of the Rideau River. It serves the Lees Avenue and Sandy Hill Heights communities, as well as the Lees Campus of the University of Ottawa.

== History ==
The transitway station has had quite a notorious history for serious incidents. Soon after the station was constructed, coal tar began seeping into the station and it was closed for two months. It was soon discovered that this industrial waste was under much of the Lees Avenue area, necessitating a $6 million cleanup operation.

The station was also the site of a deadly accident on July 18, 1994, when a 30-tonne transport truck plunged off the exit ramp of Highway 417 onto the transitway, killing two women and leaving a nine-month-old with permanent brain damage. The driver was later found guilty of dangerous driving.

In July 2003, an eastbound bus approaching the station lost control due to a mechanical breakdown, and slammed into the station. No one was seriously injured, but it took months to repair the station.

In December 2015, the Transitway from Lees station to Blair station was closed; it reopened on September 14, 2019, when Confederation Line service began.

== Layout ==
Lees station is a side platform station located at grade in a cutting. Above the platforms, the station's entrance building contains the ticket barrier and gives access to a plaza on the north side of Lees Avenue.

The station's artwork, Transparent Passage by Amy Thompson, features a series of forest designs on the station's glass platform walls, backed by sculptures of birds in flight along the retaining walls behind them.

== Service ==
The following routes serve Lees as of October 6, 2019:

Key
Line 1 (O-Train) Line 2 (O-Train) Line 4 (O-Train)	O-Train
E1	Shuttle Express
R1 R2 R4	O-Train replacement bus routes
N75	Night routes
40 12	Frequent routes
99 162	Local routes
275	Connexion routes
303	Shopper routes
405	Event routes
646	School routes
STO	Société de transport de l'Outaouais routes
Additional info: Line 1: Confederation Line; Line 2: Trillium Line; Line 4: Airport Link; Routes 5 to 199: Custom routing that that connects to Line 1 and/or 2; Routes 200 to 299: Connexion (peak-period only routes that connect to the O-Train); Routes 301 to 305: Shopper Routes (limited rural service); Routes 404 to 406: Canadian Tire Centre events; Routes 450 to 456: Lansdowne Park events; Routes 600 to 699: School Routes; Route R1: replaces Line 1 when it is out of service; Route R2: replaces Line 2 when it is out of service; Route R4: replaces Line 4 when it is out of service; Routes N39 to N98: night service (replaces Line 1 and N98 replaces Line 4); White backgrounds: limited service; Last two digits represent service area: 00s and 10s – Central; 20s – Gloucester; 30s – Orléans; 40s – Ottawa East; 50s – Ottawa West; 60s – Kanata, Stittsville; 70s – Barrhaven; 80s – Nepean; 90s – South Keys

Stop	Routes
West O-Train	Line 1 (O-Train)
East O-Train	Line 1 (O-Train)
A Lees Avenue, Southwest	10 N39 N45 56 85 N105 R1
B Lees Avenue, Northwest	10 56 85

Notes:

- Routes N39 and N45 heading towards Rideau station do not serve this station.
