= Cyrville station =

Transit station in Ottawa, Canada

Cyrville
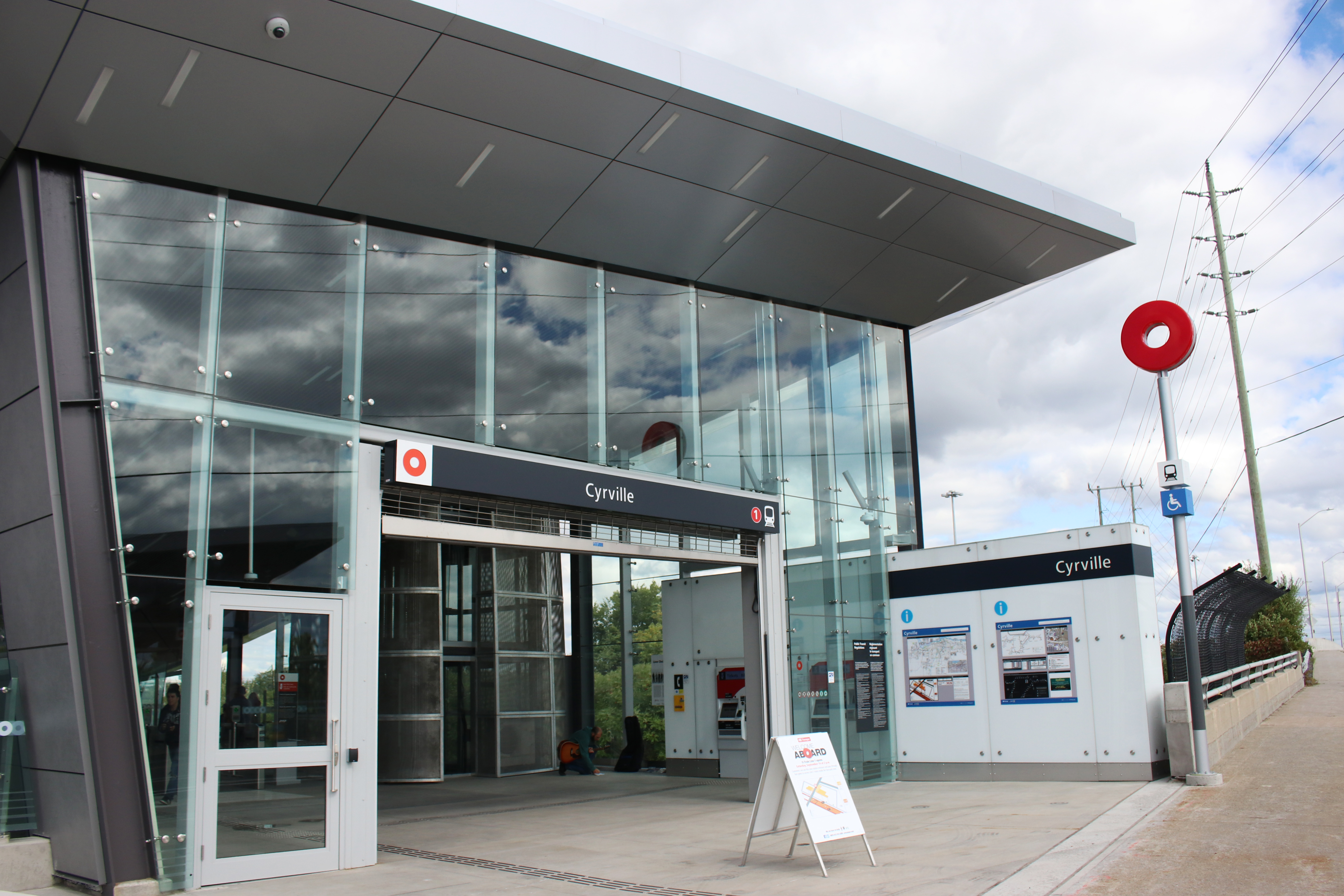

General information
- Coordinates: 45°25′21″N 75°37′35.5″W
- Owner: OC Transpo

Construction
- Accessible: Yes

History
- Opened: 1990
- Closed: June 28, 2015
- Rebuilt: September 14, 2019

Services
Preceding station	OC Transpo	Following station
St-Laurent toward Tunney's Pasture	Line 1	Blair Terminus
Location

Cyrville station is a station on Line 1 (Confederation Line) of Ottawa's O-Train light metro system, located at Cyrville Road (an arterial road serving several industrial areas) and near the Queensway.

== History ==
Cyrville station opened in 1990 as a Transitway infill station between St-Laurent and Blair. It closed on June 28, 2015 to make way for the Confederation Line construction. It reopened on September 14, 2019, when Confederation Line service began.

== Location ==
Retail stores near Cyrville station include the Desjardins credit union, Value Village and CANEX. This station serves very few riders however the limited adjacent empty lands may have development potential. Currently there are condominiums by Richcraft Homes, Brownstones at Place des Gouverneurs, which has four condominium towers built just north of the station. Richcraft Homes has added four matching apartment buildings, making these some of the closest homes to the LRT line east of downtown Ottawa.

== Layout ==
The station is an island platform station located at grade underneath the Cyrville Road overpass. Station entrances are located on either side of Cyrville Road; the northeastern entrance includes a ticket barrier, while the ticket barrier serving the southwestern entrance is located at platform level. Both accesses are wheelchair accessible as they are supplied with elevators.

The station's artwork, Stand of Birch by Don Maynard, is a cluster of sculptures representing birch trees, located beyond the northeastern end of the station platform.

== Service ==
The following routes serve Cyrville station as of January 6, 2025:

Key
Line 1 (O-Train) Line 2 (O-Train) Line 4 (O-Train)	O-Train
E1	Shuttle Express
R1 R2 R4	O-Train replacement bus routes
N75	Night routes
40 12	Frequent routes
99 162	Local routes
275	Connexion routes
303	Shopper routes
405	Event routes
646	School routes
STO	Société de transport de l'Outaouais routes
Additional info: Line 1: Confederation Line; Line 2: Trillium Line; Line 4: Airport Link; Routes 5 to 199: Custom routing that that connects to Line 1 and/or 2; Routes 200 to 299: Connexion (peak-period only routes that connect to the O-Train); Routes 301 to 305: Shopper Routes (limited rural service); Routes 404 to 406: Canadian Tire Centre events; Routes 450 to 456: Lansdowne Park events; Routes 600 to 699: School Routes; Route R1: replaces Line 1 when it is out of service; Route R2: replaces Line 2 when it is out of service; Route R4: replaces Line 4 when it is out of service; Routes N39 to N98: night service (replaces Line 1 and N98 replaces Line 4); White backgrounds: limited service; Last two digits represent service area: 00s and 10s – Central; 20s – Gloucester; 30s – Orléans; 40s – Ottawa East; 50s – Ottawa West; 60s – Kanata, Stittsville; 70s – Barrhaven; 80s – Nepean; 90s – South Keys

Stop(s)	Routes
West O-Train	Line 1 (O-Train)
East O-Train	Line 1 (O-Train)
A and B Cyrville Road, in front of the station	R1 (Cyrville-St Laurent Shuttle)
C and D Cyrville and Cummings intersection	N39
Labrie and Cyrville intersection	42

=== Notes ===
- Certain route 42 trips in AM/PM peak periods start/end at this station

== Gallery ==
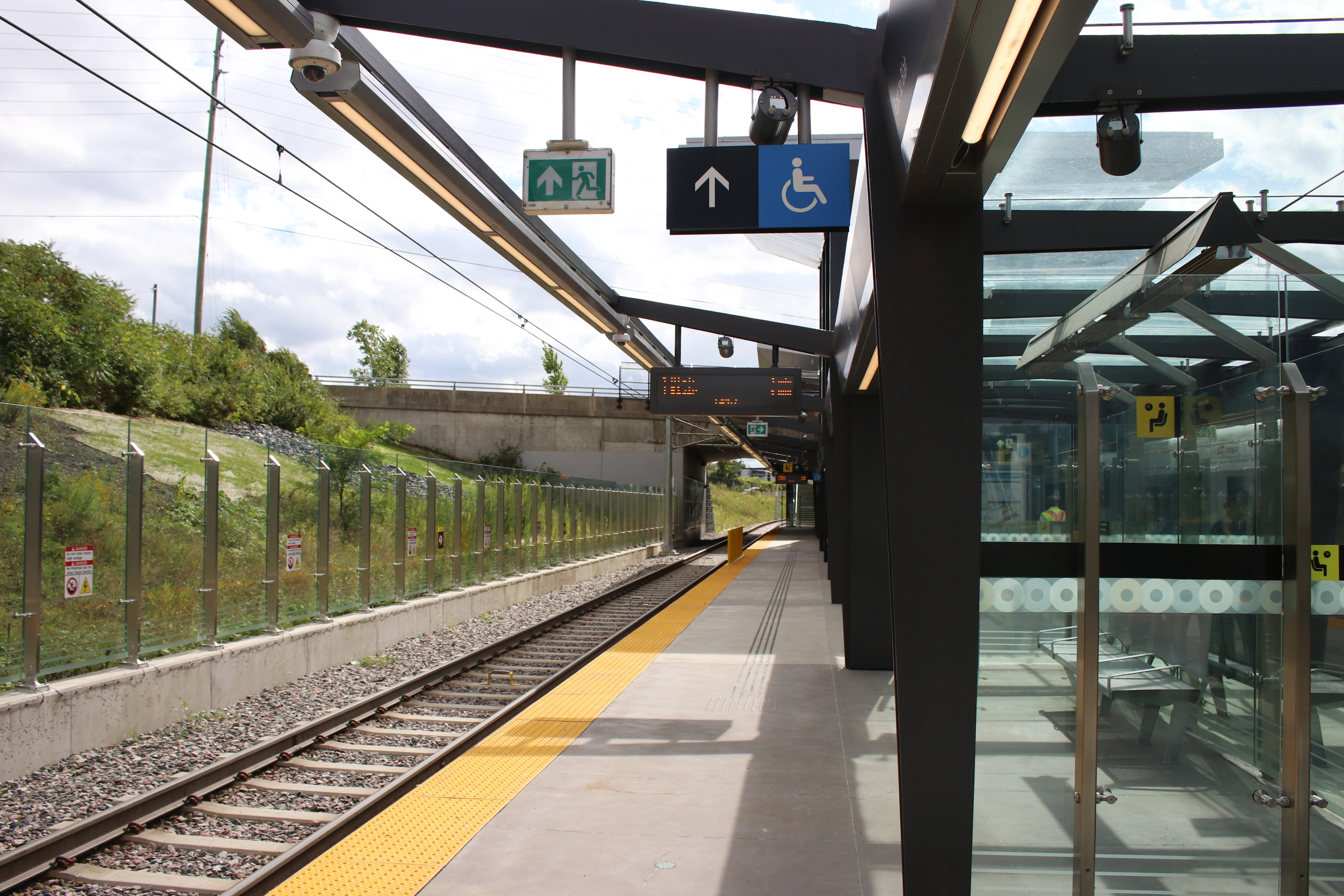
Platform to Blair station

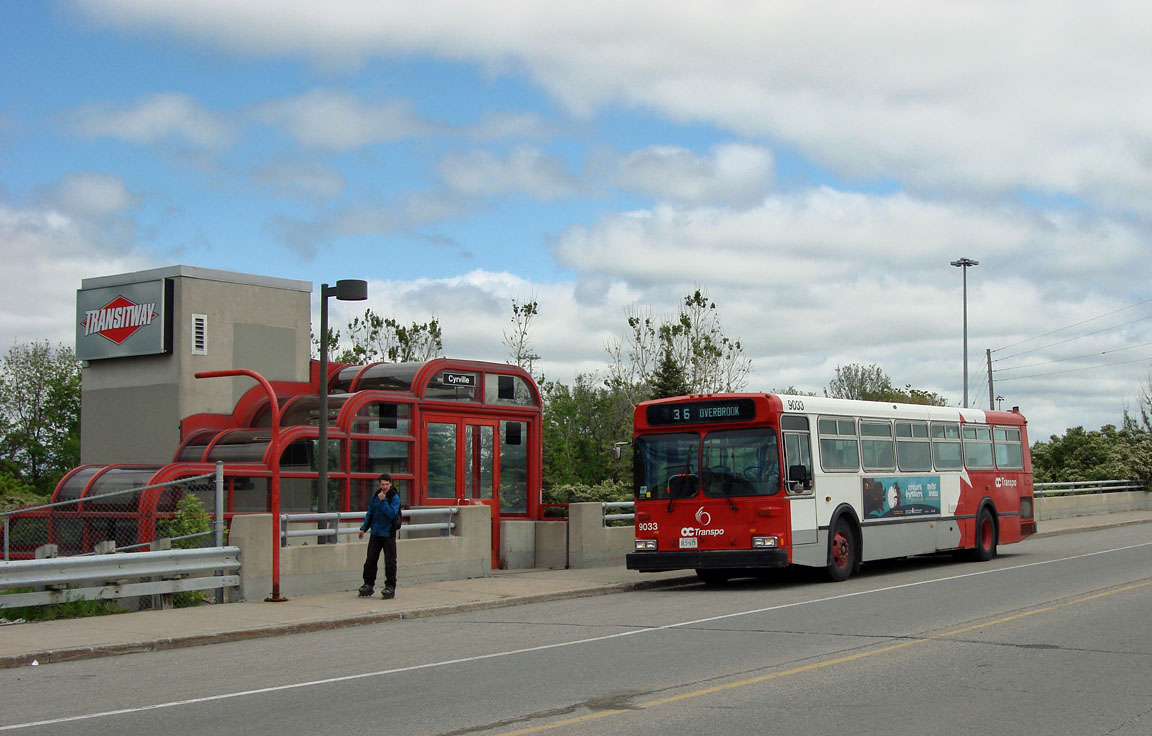
Original Transitway station

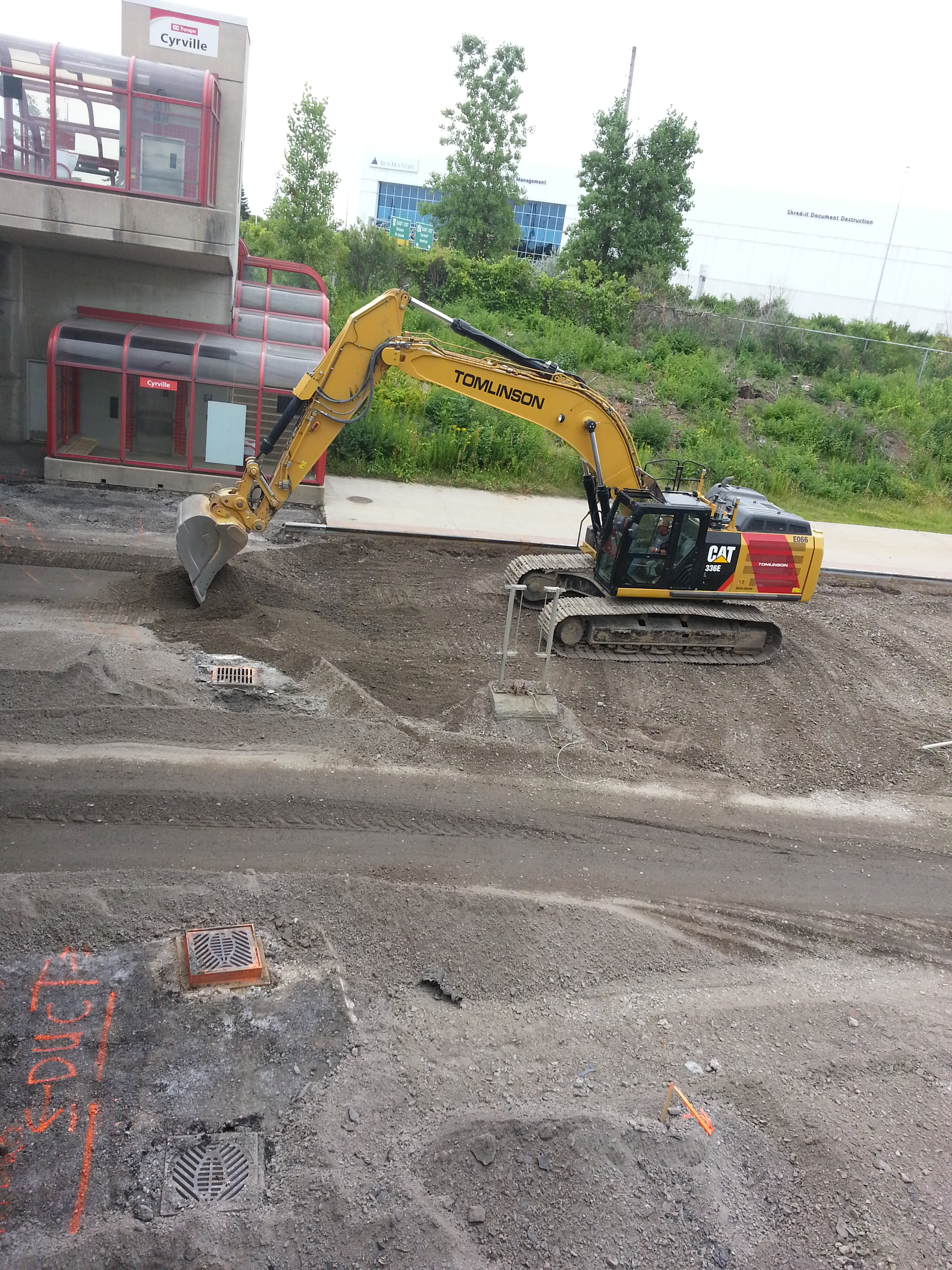
O-Train construction (2015)

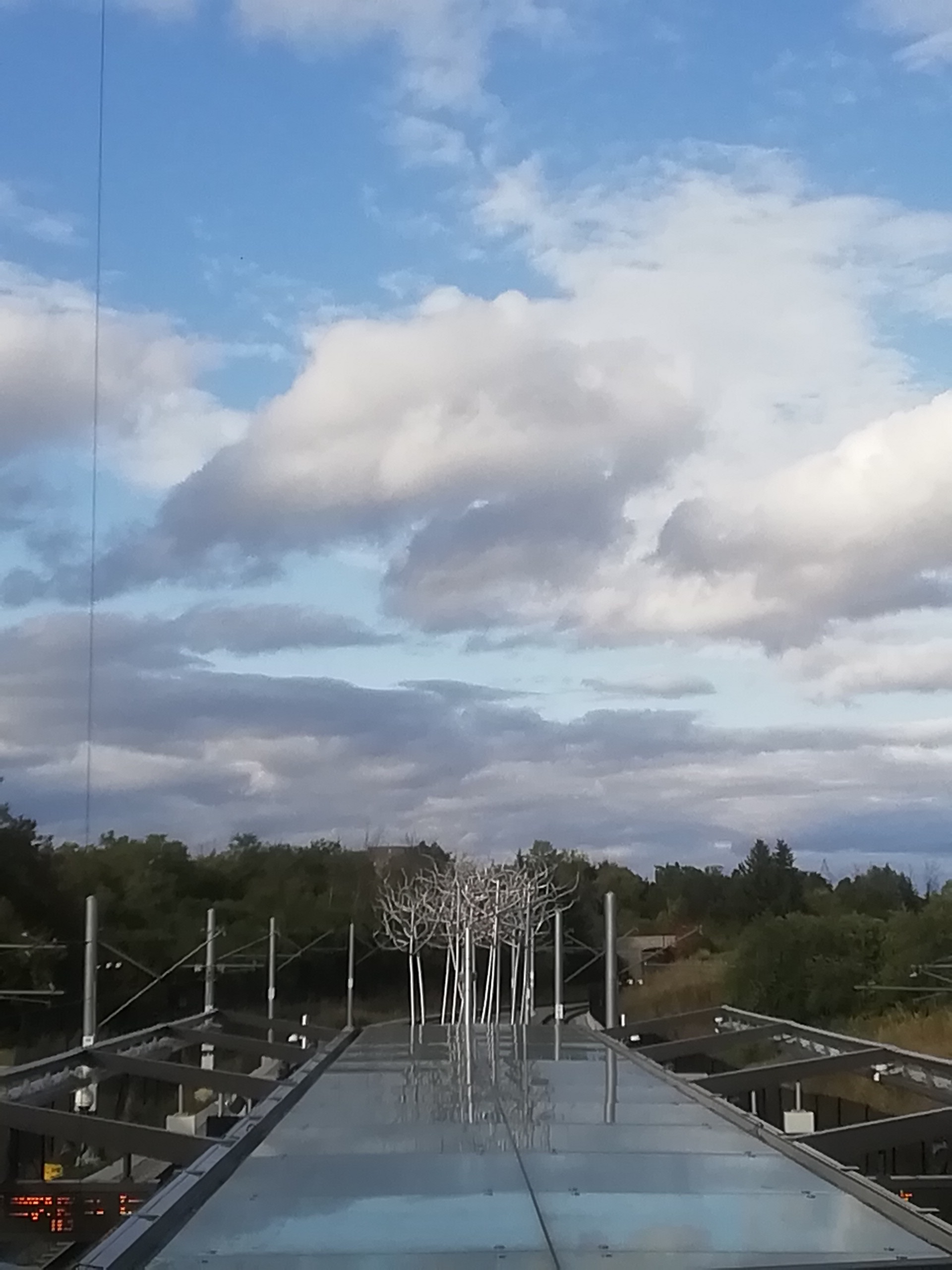
Don Maynard's Stack of Birch
