= Lyon station =

Transit station in Ottawa, Canada

Lyon
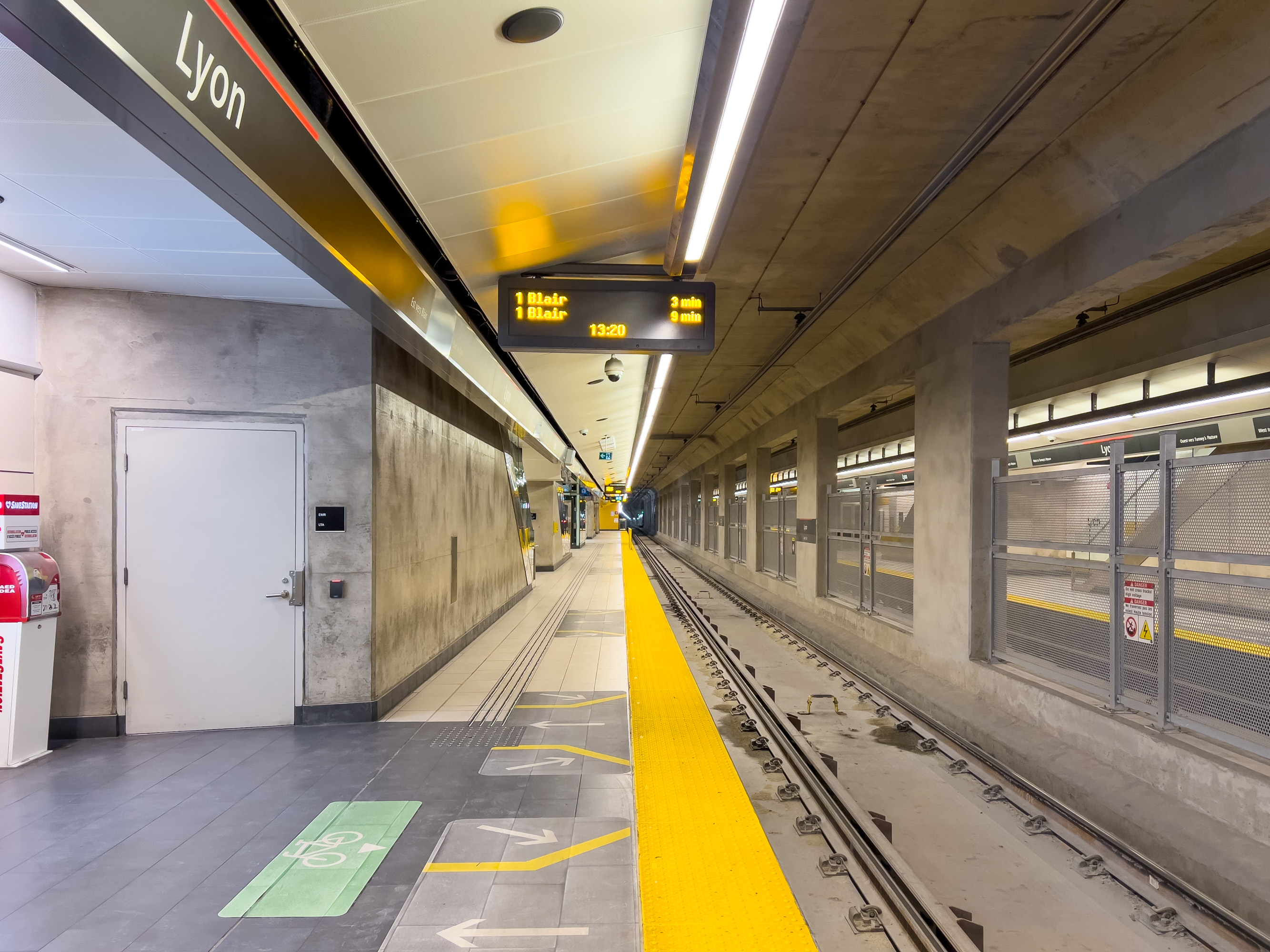
- Lyon Station, platform level

General information
- Location: Lyon Street, Ottawa, Ontario; Canada
- Coordinates: 45°25′10″N 75°42′16″W
- Owner: OC Transpo
- Platforms: Side platforms
- Tracks: 2

Construction
- Structure type: Underground
- Accessible: Yes

History
- Opened: September 14, 2019

Services
Preceding station	OC Transpo	Following station
Pimisi toward Tunney's Pasture	Line 1	Parliament toward Blair
Location

Lyon station (/ˈlaɪən/ LY-ən) is an underground light rail station on Line 1 of the O-Train in Ottawa located in the western portion of Ottawa's downtown, specifically at Lyon Street and Queen Street, the latter being the street the line runs under within Ottawa's downtown core.

== Location ==
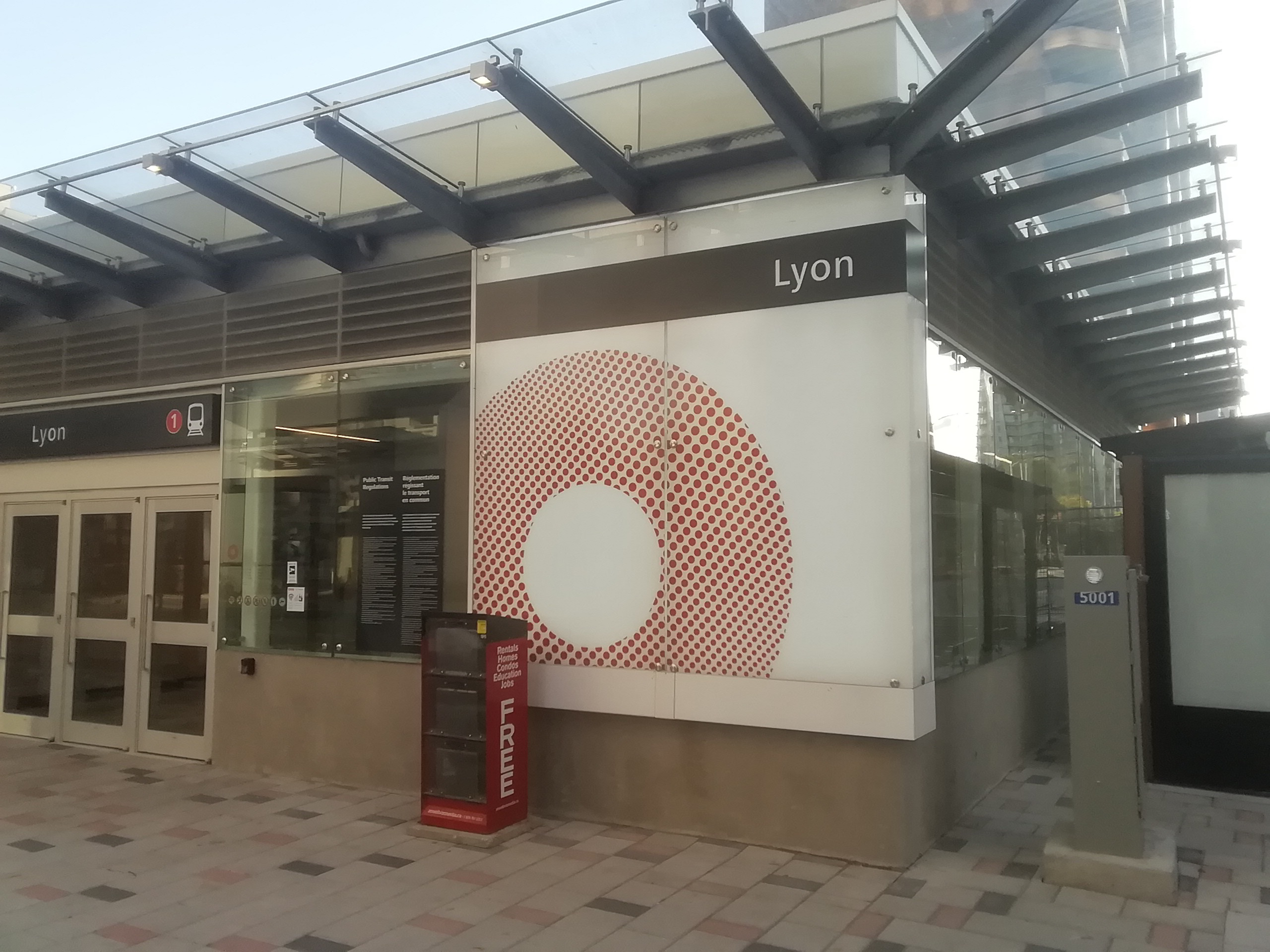
Street entrance

This O-Train station opened on September 14, 2019. It is located at the Lyon Street North and Queen Street intersection, between Bay Street and Kent Street, which formerly served as Transitway bus stops on Albert Street and Slater Street. This stop is projected to have high usage, with access to Sparks Street, the Supreme Court, and the National Archives of Canada.

== Layout ==
The station is an underground side platform station; the platforms are located 17.5 metres underground. A concourse above platform level has ticket barriers on either end, giving access to the Lyon Street (east) and Place de Ville (west) accesses.

An entrance is integrated into the Place de Ville complex, giving indoor access to a mid-rise office building, three office towers and two major hotels.

The station features two artworks: With Words as their Actions by PLANT Architect, led by Lisa Rapoport, a metal sculpture at concourse level, and This Image Relies on Positive Thinking by Geoff McFetridge, a series of murals of human figures located in the accesses.

== History ==
From July 16 to September 14, 2017, the underground light and music show Kontinuum was held in the not-yet-opened station as part of the Canada 150 celebrations.

== Service ==
Key
Line 1 (O-Train) Line 2 (O-Train) Line 4 (O-Train)	O-Train
E1	Shuttle Express
R1 R2 R4	O-Train replacement bus routes
N75	Night routes
40 12	Frequent routes
99 162	Local routes
275	Connexion routes
303	Shopper routes
405	Event routes
646	School routes
STO	Société de transport de l'Outaouais routes
Additional info: Line 1: Confederation Line; Line 2: Trillium Line; Line 4: Airport Link; Routes 5 to 199: Custom routing that that connects to Line 1 and/or 2; Routes 200 to 299: Connexion (peak-period only routes that connect to the O-Train); Routes 301 to 305: Shopper Routes (limited rural service); Routes 404 to 406: Canadian Tire Centre events; Routes 450 to 456: Lansdowne Park events; Routes 600 to 699: School Routes; Route R1: replaces Line 1 when it is out of service; Route R2: replaces Line 2 when it is out of service; Route R4: replaces Line 4 when it is out of service; Routes N39 to N98: night service (replaces Line 1 and N98 replaces Line 4); White backgrounds: limited service; Last two digits represent service area: 00s and 10s – Central; 20s – Gloucester; 30s – Orléans; 40s – Ottawa East; 50s – Ottawa West; 60s – Kanata, Stittsville; 70s – Barrhaven; 80s – Nepean; 90s – South Keys

The following routes serve Lyon station as of October 6 2019:

Stop	Routes
East O-Train	Line 1 (O-Train)
West O-Train	Line 1 (O-Train)
A Lyon St. South	10 12 N57 N61 N63 N75
B Queen St. East	10 12 N57 N61 N63 N75
C Lyon St. North	STO
D Kent / Sparks	STO
E Albert / Lyon	R1 E1
F Slater / Kent	R1 E1
