= Rideau station =

Light rail station in Downtown Ottawa

Rideau
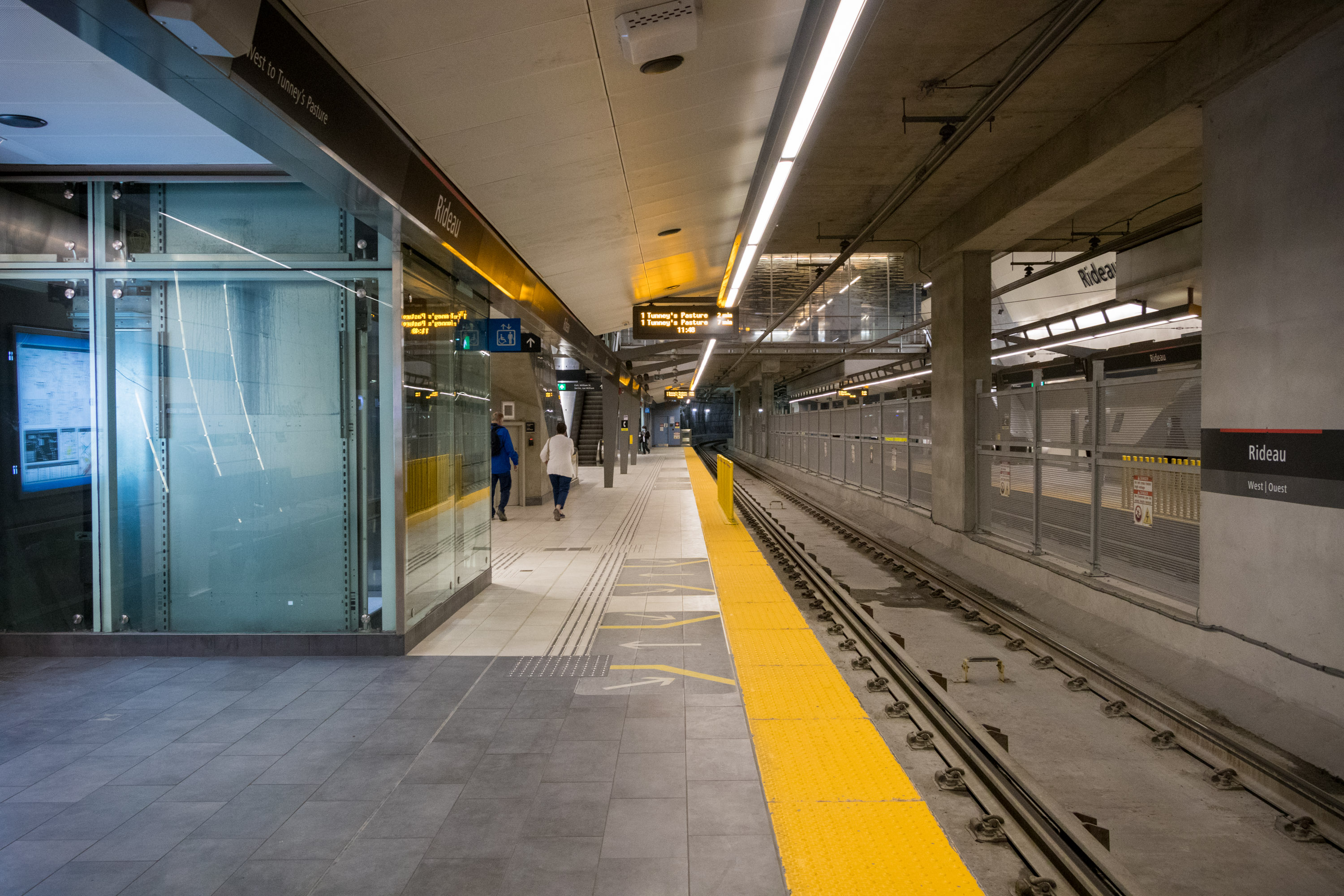
- Rideau station westbound platform

General information
- Other names: Mackenzie King
- Location: Rideau Street, Ottawa, Ontario; Canada
- Coordinates: 45°25′34″N 75°41′31″W
- Owner: OC Transpo
- Tracks: 2

Construction
- Structure type: Underground
- Accessible: Yes

History
- Opened: September 14, 2019

Services
Preceding station	OC Transpo	Following station
Parliament toward Tunney's Pasture	Line 1	uOttawa toward Blair
Location

Rideau station is a station on the O-Train Line 1 on Rideau Street on the border of the Sandy Hill and ByWard Market neighbourhoods in Central Ottawa, Ontario, Canada.

== Location ==
The underground station is beneath Rideau Street in Central Ottawa.

Originally, Rideau station was to be built under the Rideau Canal, with a station at Confederation Square, closer to Parliament Hill. It was decided to relocate the station to the east in partnership with Cadillac Fairview, the owners of the Rideau Centre, where it would serve more people and provide access to the ByWard Market.

There are two entrances from the Rideau Centre on the south side and another built into a Scotiabank on the north side of Rideau Street, at the threshold of the ByWard Market.

Through the Rideau Centre, riders can walk to Hudson's Bay, the Westin Hotel, the Shaw Centre, the Transportation Building and the National Defence Headquarters without stepping outside.

The station serves destinations such as the ByWard Market, National Gallery, US Embassy, Shaw Centre, Government Conference Centre, Rideau Canal, National War Memorial, Château Laurier and National Arts Centre, as well as retail shops, restaurants and hotels.

== Layout ==
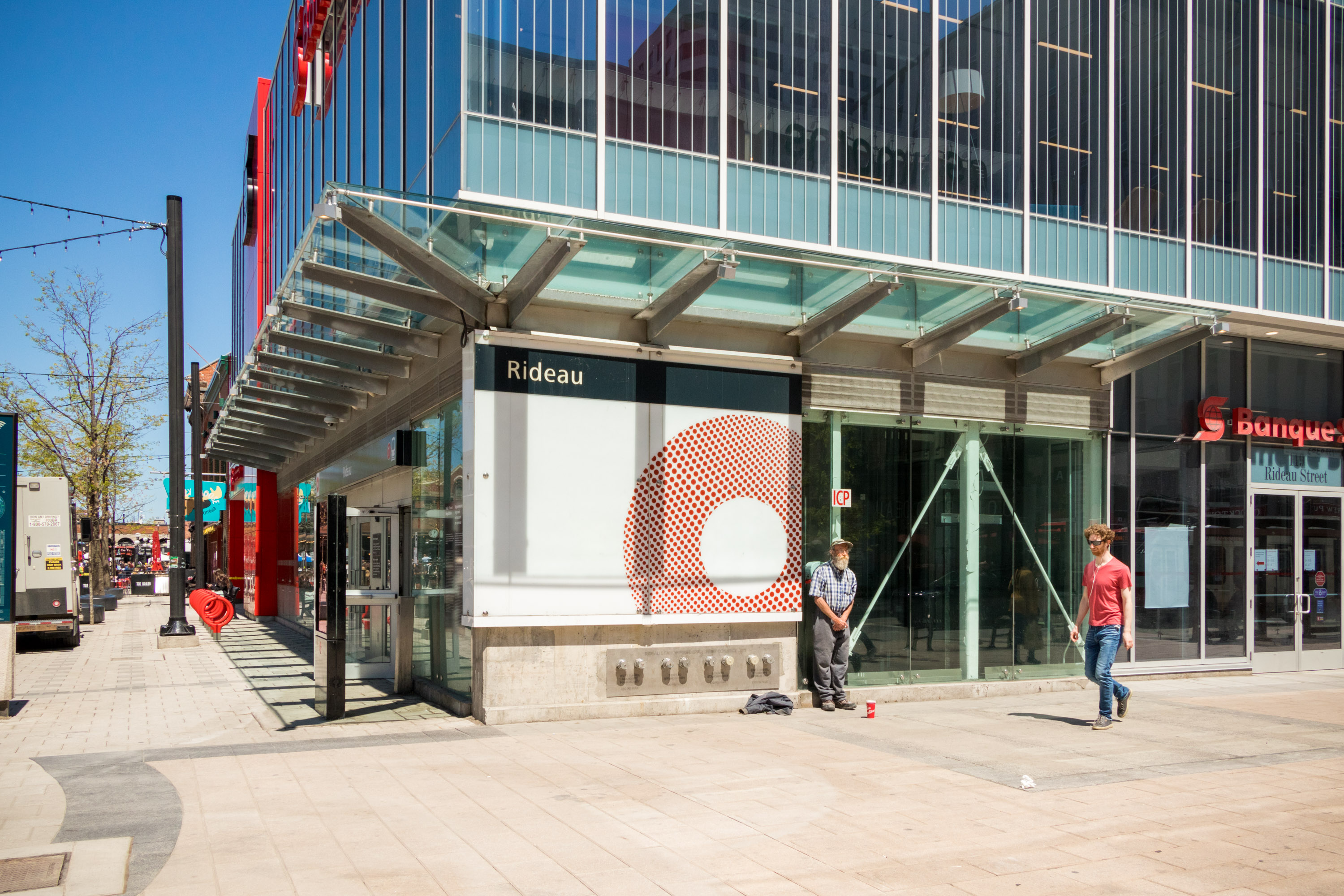
Entrance at the corner of Rideau and William Streets

Rideau station is an underground side platform station. Two concourses located above the two ends of the platforms contain the ticket barriers and give access to the Rideau Centre (west concourse) and the William Street/ByWard Market exit (east concourse). Both concourses feature elevators to the surface and the platforms.

The station is the deepest on Ottawa's network, with the platform 26.5 metres underground. It also has the longest transit escalator in Canada at 35.3 metres.

The station features two artworks: FLOW/FLOTS by Geneviève Cadieux, a set of two glass screens on the station concourses overlooking the platforms; and The shape this takes to get to that by Jim Verburg, a set of murals in the access stairwells. Additionally, an exhibition area called "Corridor 45|75" is located along the corridor connecting the west concourse with the access to the Rideau Centre.

== Service ==
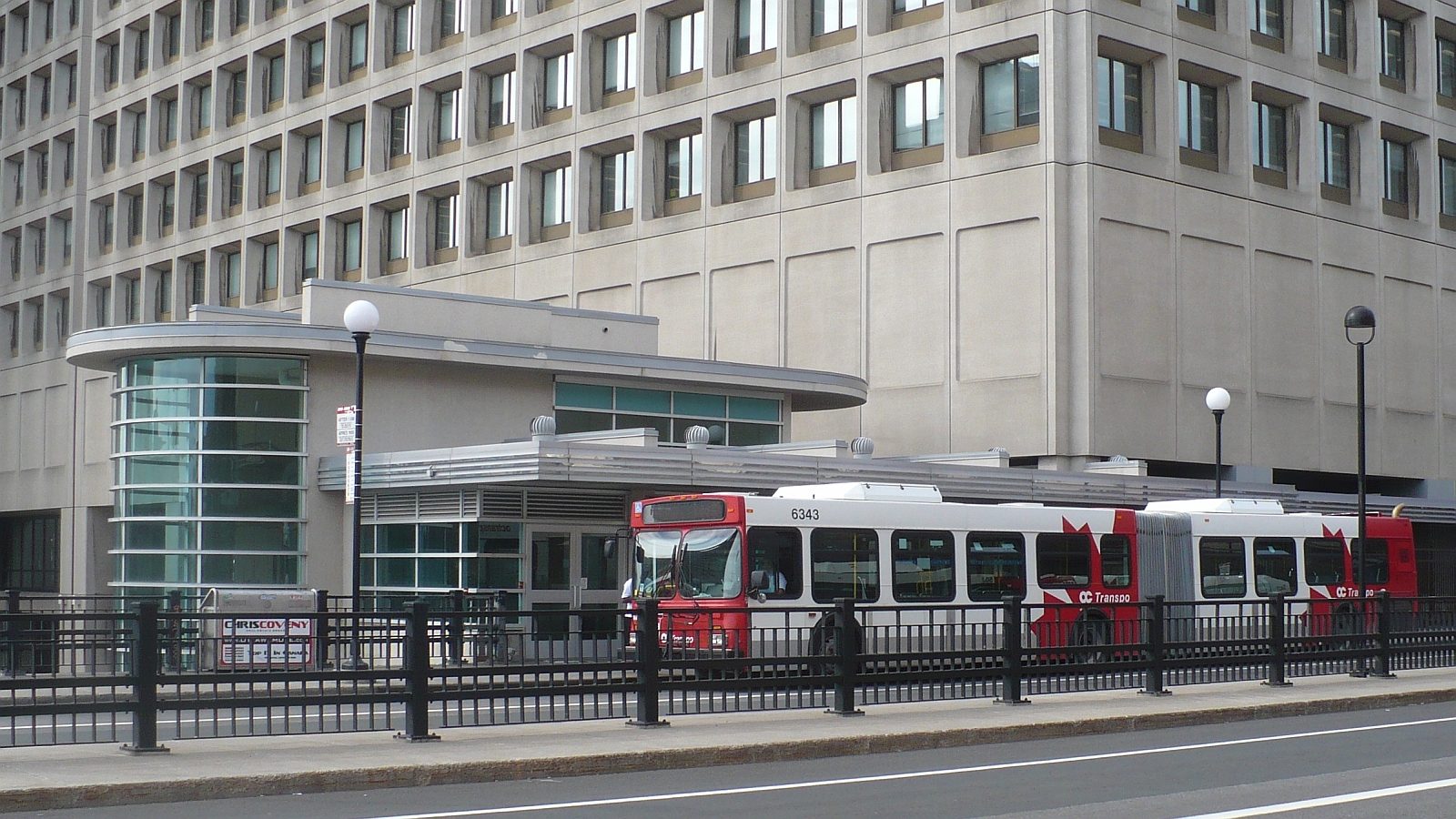
OC Transpo bus at Mackenzie King station, east platform.

The following routes serve Rideau station as of December 20, 2020: Route 12 is temporarily truncated west of St. Laurent Boulevard due to the Montreal Road revitalization project. Connections with Société de transport de l'Outaouais as well as OC Transpo routes R1, 11, 16, and 19, exist on the other side of the Rideau Centre, at Mackenzie King station, accessed via an indoor interchange.

Key
Line 1 (O-Train) Line 2 (O-Train) Line 4 (O-Train)	O-Train
E1	Shuttle Express
R1 R2 R4	O-Train replacement bus routes
N75	Night routes
40 12	Frequent routes
99 162	Local routes
275	Connexion routes
303	Shopper routes
405	Event routes
646	School routes
STO	Société de transport de l'Outaouais routes
Additional info: Line 1: Confederation Line; Line 2: Trillium Line; Line 4: Airport Link; Routes 5 to 199: Custom routing that that connects to Line 1 and/or 2; Routes 200 to 299: Connexion (peak-period only routes that connect to the O-Train); Routes 301 to 305: Shopper Routes (limited rural service); Routes 404 to 406: Canadian Tire Centre events; Routes 450 to 456: Lansdowne Park events; Routes 600 to 699: School Routes; Route R1: replaces Line 1 when it is out of service; Route R2: replaces Line 2 when it is out of service; Route R4: replaces Line 4 when it is out of service; Routes N39 to N98: night service (replaces Line 1 and N98 replaces Line 4); White backgrounds: limited service; Last two digits represent service area: 00s and 10s – Central; 20s – Gloucester; 30s – Orléans; 40s – Ottawa East; 50s – Ottawa West; 60s – Kanata, Stittsville; 70s – Barrhaven; 80s – Nepean; 90s – South Keys

Stop	Routes
East O-Train	Line 1 (O-Train)
West O-Train	Line 1 (O-Train)
A Rideau St. West	5 6 7 12 14 15 17 18 N57 N61 N63 N75 450
B Rideau St. East	5 6 7 12 14 15 17 18 N39 N45 N105
C Sussex Dr. North	9
D Rideau St. West	6 9
Mackenzie King A Mackenzie King Bridge North	R1 E1 10 11 19 19 STO
Mackenzie King B Mackenzie King Bridge South	R1 E1 10 11 19 606 STO

== Problems ==
A sinkhole unexpectedly appeared on June 8, 2016, on Rideau Street adjoining the excavation for the underground station.

Since the station opening, Rideau station have a 'rotten egg' smell and could not resolve.
