= Dominion station =

Transitway station in Ottawa, Ontario

Dominion
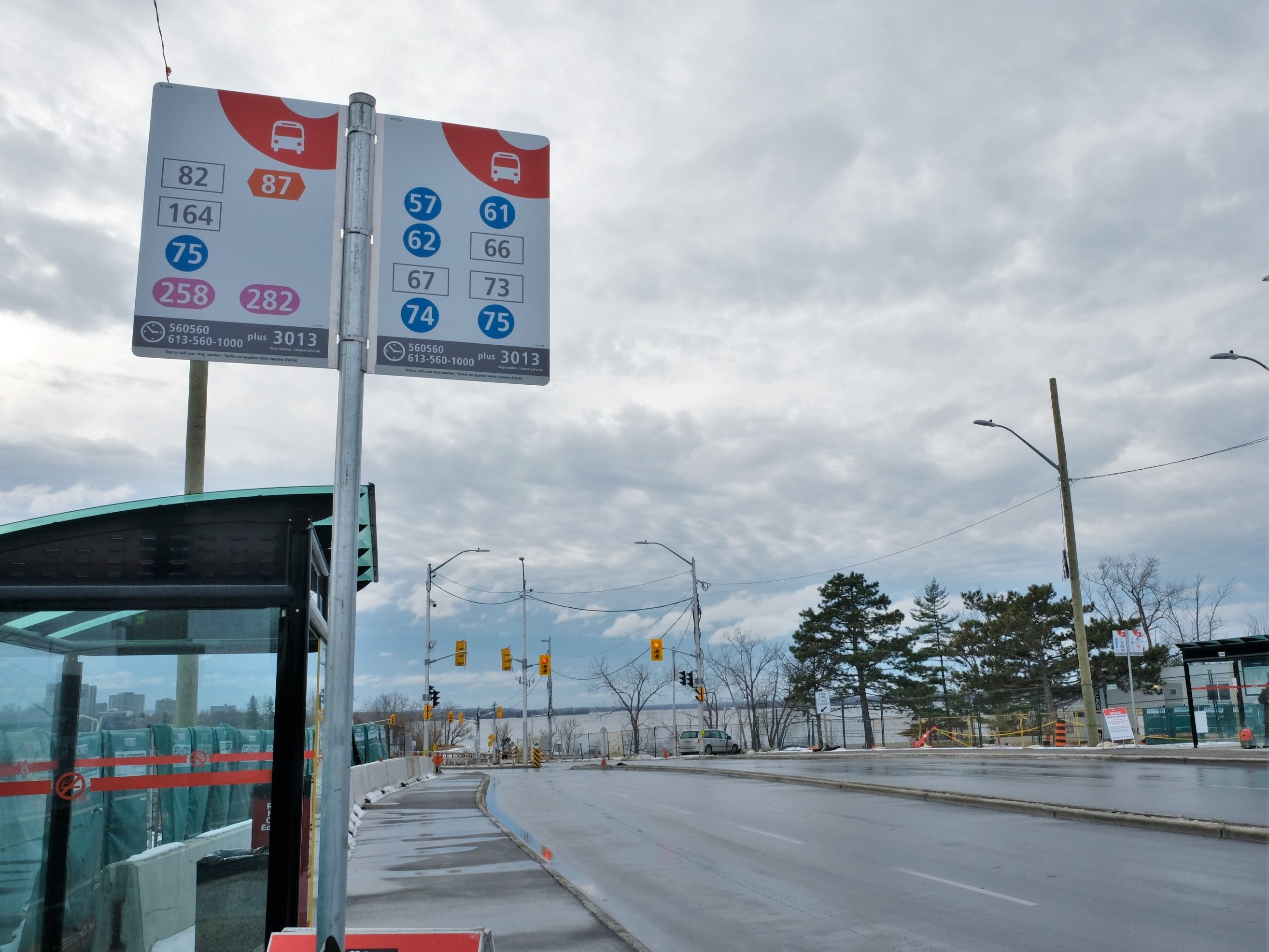

General information
- Location: Ottawa, Ontario; Canada
- Coordinates: 45°23′32″N 75°45′38″W
- Owner: OC Transpo

Construction
- Structure type: Trench (LRT station)

History
- Opened: November 29, 1999

Services
Preceding station	OC Transpo	Following station
Lincoln Fields toward Carling Campus	Route 57	Westboro toward Tunney's Pasture
Lincoln Fields toward Abbot POC	Route 58	Westboro toward Tunney's Pasture
Lincoln Fields toward Stittsville	Route 61	Westboro toward Tunney's Pasture
Lincoln Fields toward Stittsville	Route 62	Westboro toward Tunney's Pasture
Lincoln Fields toward Innovation	Route 63	Westboro toward Tunney's Pasture
Lincoln Fields toward Limebank	Route 74	Westboro toward Tunney's Pasture
Lincoln Fields toward Cambrian	Route 75	Westboro toward Tunney's Pasture

Future services
Preceding station	OC Transpo	Following station
Sherbourne toward Algonquin	Line 1 Opens 2027	Westboro toward Trim
Sherbourne toward Moodie	Line 3 Opens 2027	Westboro toward Trim
Location

Dominion station is a station on the Transitway in Ottawa, Ontario. It is located north of the western edge of Westboro village, where the below-grade transitway segment joins the Kichi Zībī Mīkan. The station is named after nearby Dominion Avenue.

Opened on November 29, 1999 as an intermediate station between the long-established Lincoln Fields and Westboro stations, Dominion station consists of two bus shelters and a grade level crosswalk rather than a true station with platforms. It has no connections to local routes but is actually very close (225m) to the commercial strip on Richmond Road in Westboro village and Westboro Beach.

It serves a primarily residential neighbourhood which previously had only frequent route 11 service on Richmond Road for regular transit service. The Académie de Formation Linguistique building at 495 Richmond Road (the former Denis Coolican Building, originally operated by the City of Ottawa) is also served by this station.

A new light rail station is being built as part of the western extension of O-Train Line 1. When the extension is complete, the station will be renamed to Kichi Zìbì to match the adjacent Kichi Zībī Mīkan and nearby Kitchissippi Lookout.

== Service ==
The following routes serve Dominion station as of April 27, 2025:

Key
Line 1 (O-Train) Line 2 (O-Train) Line 4 (O-Train)	O-Train
E1	Shuttle Express
R1 R2 R4	O-Train replacement bus routes
N75	Night routes
40 12	Frequent routes
99 162	Local routes
275	Connexion routes
303	Shopper routes
405	Event routes
646	School routes
STO	Société de transport de l'Outaouais routes
Additional info: Line 1: Confederation Line; Line 2: Trillium Line; Line 4: Airport Link; Routes 5 to 199: Custom routing that that connects to Line 1 and/or 2; Routes 200 to 299: Connexion (peak-period only routes that connect to the O-Train); Routes 301 to 305: Shopper Routes (limited rural service); Routes 404 to 406: Canadian Tire Centre events; Routes 450 to 456: Lansdowne Park events; Routes 600 to 699: School Routes; Route R1: replaces Line 1 when it is out of service; Route R2: replaces Line 2 when it is out of service; Route R4: replaces Line 4 when it is out of service; Routes N39 to N98: night service (replaces Line 1 and N98 replaces Line 4); White backgrounds: limited service; Last two digits represent service area: 00s and 10s – Central; 20s – Gloucester; 30s – Orléans; 40s – Ottawa East; 50s – Ottawa West; 60s – Kanata, Stittsville; 70s – Barrhaven; 80s – Nepean; 90s – South Keys

Stop	Routes
West O-Train	Under construction (opening in 2027)
East O-Train	Under construction (opening in 2027)
1A Transitway West	57 58 60 61 62 63 66 67 73 74 75 82 87 164 256 261 262 263 265 266 404
2A Transitway East	57 58 60 61 62 63 66 67 73 74 75 82 87
