= Teron station =

Bus stop in Ottawa, Ontario

Teron

General information
- Coordinates: 45°19′21.0″N 75°53′22.2″W
- Owner: OC Transpo

Other information
- Station code: 3018

History
- Opened: 2007

Services
Preceding station	OC Transpo	Following station
Terry Fox toward Stittsville	Route 62	Moodie One-way operation
Terry Fox toward Stittsville	Route 62	Eagleson toward Tunney's Pasture
Innovation Terminus	Route 63	Moodie One-way operation
Innovation Terminus	Route 63	Eagleson toward Tunney's Pasture
Innovation Terminus	Route 110	Eagleson toward Limebank
Location

Teron is a curbside bus stop operated by OC Transpo in Ottawa, Ontario. The stop is located in the suburb of Kanata on Campeau Drive just east of the intersection with Teron Road from which it takes its name, which in turn was named after William Teron, who was responsible for developing Kanata. It is near the western off-ramp of Highway 417 at March Road and an overpass north of Eagleson station and Park and ride. Teron was officially included in the Transitway system in the 2007 fall schedules.

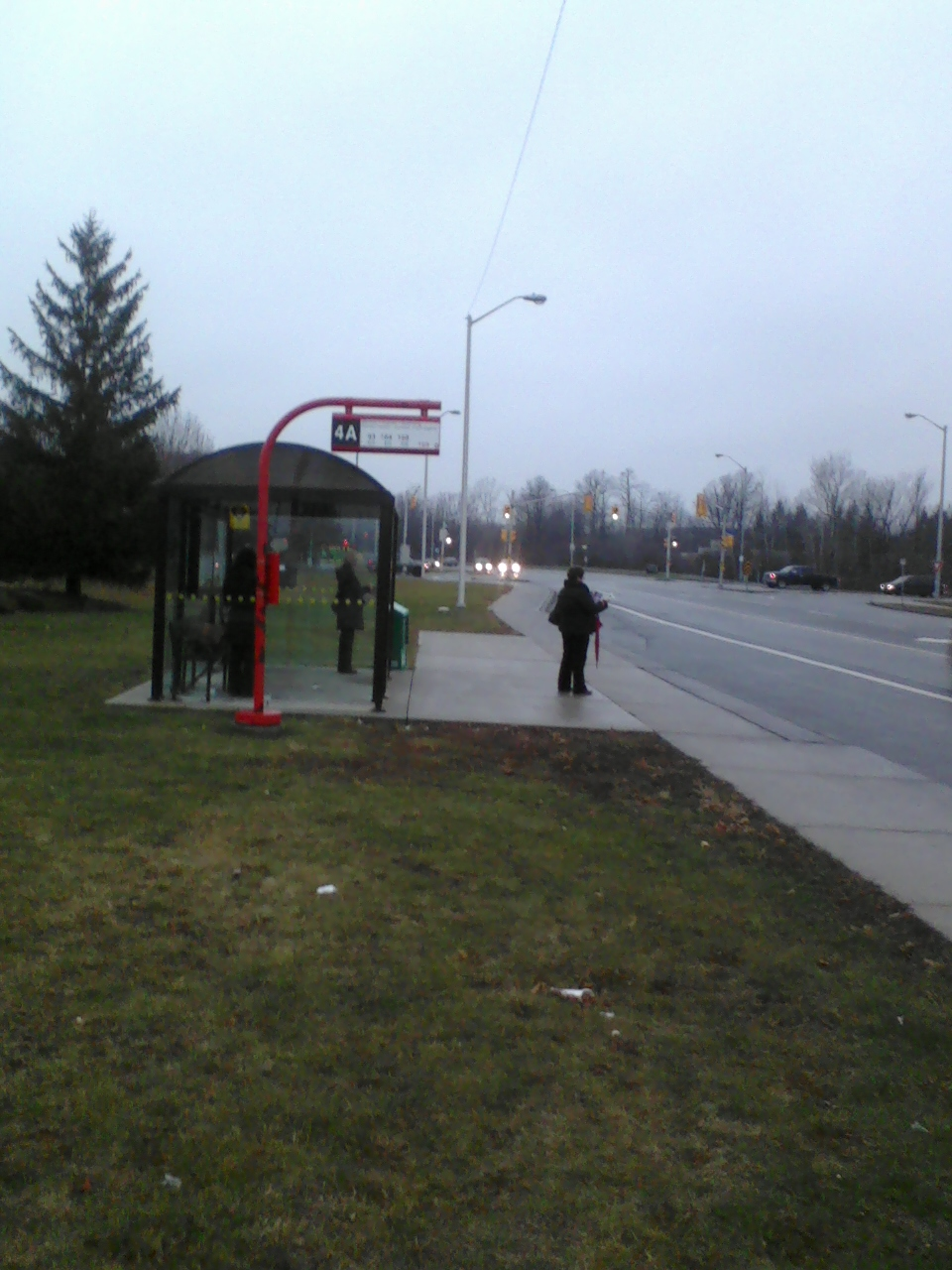
A picture of the station

The main purpose of the new Transitway facility according to OC Transpo's Transplan program as the result of public consultation process on transit improvement was to improve connections between local routes in Kanata North and routes 63 and 64, which travel to the Kanata North Business Park from Pimisi station and Lincoln Fields station. Other routes, such as route 62, route 164 (serving Hope Side Road), and route 168 (serving Beaverbrook and Bridlewood serve Teron, and routes 62, 164, and 168 all provide a connection to Kanata Centrum at Terry Fox station from routes 63 and 64 in Kanata North.

Additionally, Teron could be part of a future extension of the Western Segment of the Transitway. According to the Ottawa Transportation Master Plan, the segment from Eagleson Road to Terry Fox Drive is scheduled to be completed by 2031.

== Service ==
The following routes serve Teron station as of April 27, 2025:

Key
Line 1 (O-Train) Line 2 (O-Train) Line 4 (O-Train)	O-Train
E1	Shuttle Express
R1 R2 R4	O-Train replacement bus routes
N75	Night routes
40 12	Frequent routes
99 162	Local routes
275	Connexion routes
303	Shopper routes
405	Event routes
646	School routes
STO	Société de transport de l'Outaouais routes
Additional info: Line 1: Confederation Line; Line 2: Trillium Line; Line 4: Airport Link; Routes 5 to 199: Custom routing that that connects to Line 1 and/or 2; Routes 200 to 299: Connexion (peak-period only routes that connect to the O-Train); Routes 301 to 305: Shopper Routes (limited rural service); Routes 404 to 406: Canadian Tire Centre events; Routes 450 to 456: Lansdowne Park events; Routes 600 to 699: School Routes; Route R1: replaces Line 1 when it is out of service; Route R2: replaces Line 2 when it is out of service; Route R4: replaces Line 4 when it is out of service; Routes N39 to N98: night service (replaces Line 1 and N98 replaces Line 4); White backgrounds: limited service; Last two digits represent service area: 00s and 10s – Central; 20s – Gloucester; 30s – Orléans; 40s – Ottawa East; 50s – Ottawa West; 60s – Kanata, Stittsville; 70s – Barrhaven; 80s – Nepean; 90s – South Keys

Stop	Routes
1A West	62 63 110 168 265 660 661 688
2A East	62 63 110 168 265 660 661 688
