= Westboro station =

Bus station in Ottawa, Ontario, Canada

Westboro
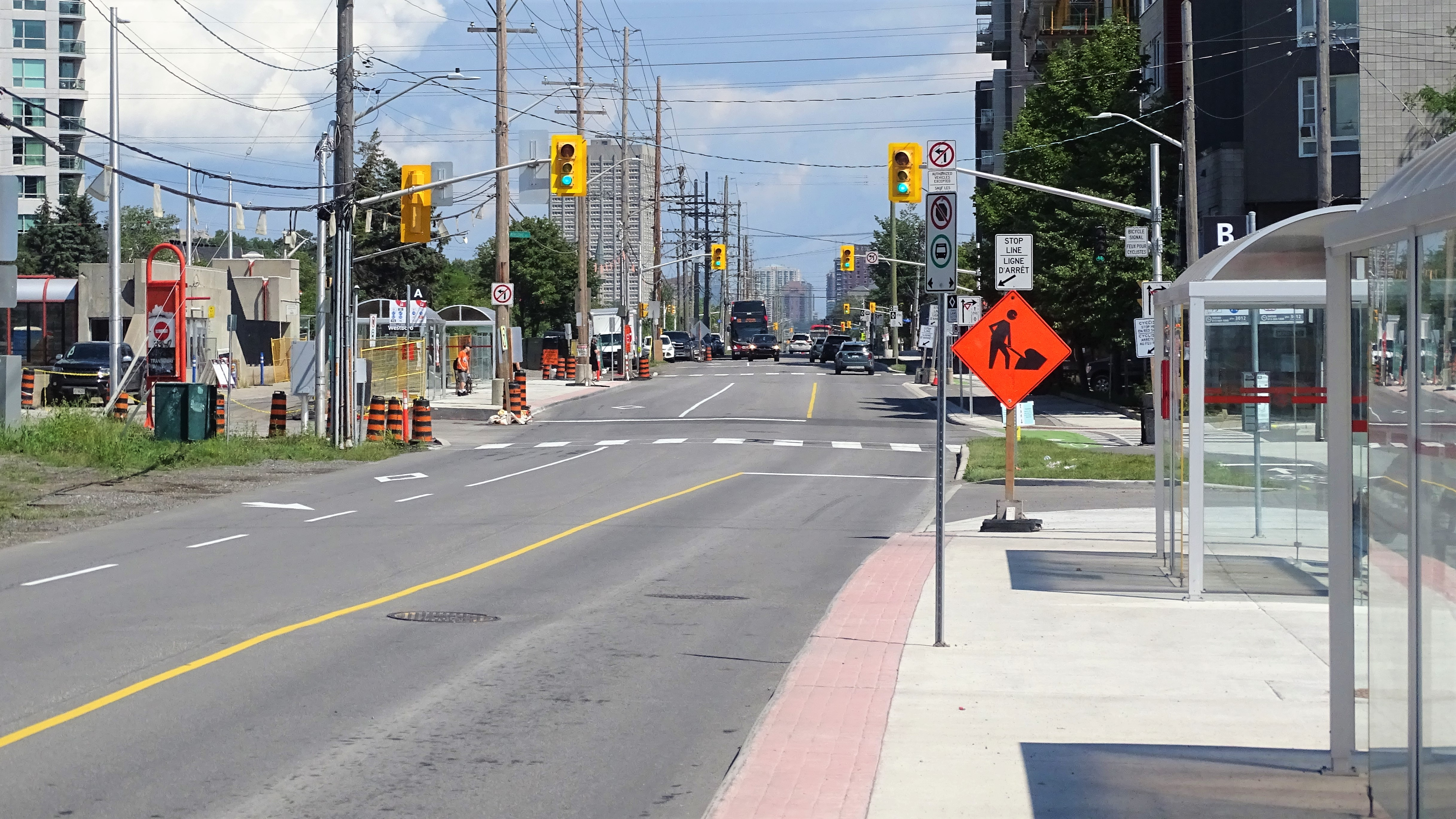
- Westboro's temporary bus station during O-Train Stage 2 construction

General information
- Coordinates: 45°23′47.5″N 75°45′08″W
- Owner: OC Transpo

Construction
- Structure type: Trench (LRT station)

Services
Preceding station	OC Transpo	Following station
Dominion toward Carling Campus	Route 57	Tunney's Pasture Terminus
Dominion toward Abbot POC	Route 58	Tunney's Pasture Terminus
Dominion toward Stittsville	Route 61	Tunney's Pasture Terminus
Dominion toward Stittsville	Route 62	Tunney's Pasture Terminus
Dominion toward Innovation	Route 63	Tunney's Pasture Terminus
Dominion toward Limebank	Route 74	Tunney's Pasture Terminus
Dominion toward Cambrian	Route 75	Tunney's Pasture Terminus

Future services
Preceding station	OC Transpo	Following station
Kìchì Sìbì toward Algonquin	Line 1 Opens 2027	Tunney's Pasture toward Trim
Kìchì Sìbì toward Moodie	Line 3 Opens 2027	Tunney's Pasture toward Trim
Location

Westboro station currently serves as a bus station in Ottawa, Ontario. It is located in the Westboro neighbourhood, on Scott Street between Athlone and Tweedsmuir avenues.

It was formerly a Transitway station, in a below-grade 'trench' paralleling Scott Street. Each platform had an elevator and stairway to the ground level above; the two sides were connected by an enclosed pedestrian bridge, and the ground-level station area also had platforms for local buses. In June 2022, this stretch of Transitway was permanently closed to facilitate O-Train Stage 2 construction. The bus stops were relocated to curbside along Scott Street, and the original station was closed.

== History ==
=== January 2019 accident ===
On January 11, 2019, an OC Transpo double-decker bus, operating on route 269 to Kanata, crashed into the bus shelter at Westboro Station. The crash killed three people and injured twenty-three others, and part of the upper deck of the bus was torn off on impact.

The collision was investigated by the Ottawa Police Service, with assistance from the Transportation Safety Board; they cleared the city of Ottawa and OC Transpo of criminal wrongdoing. The police arrested the driver and charged her with three counts of dangerous driving causing death and 35 counts of dangerous driving causing bodily harm. She was acquitted at trial after the judge placed blame for the crash on road conditions and misleading road markers.

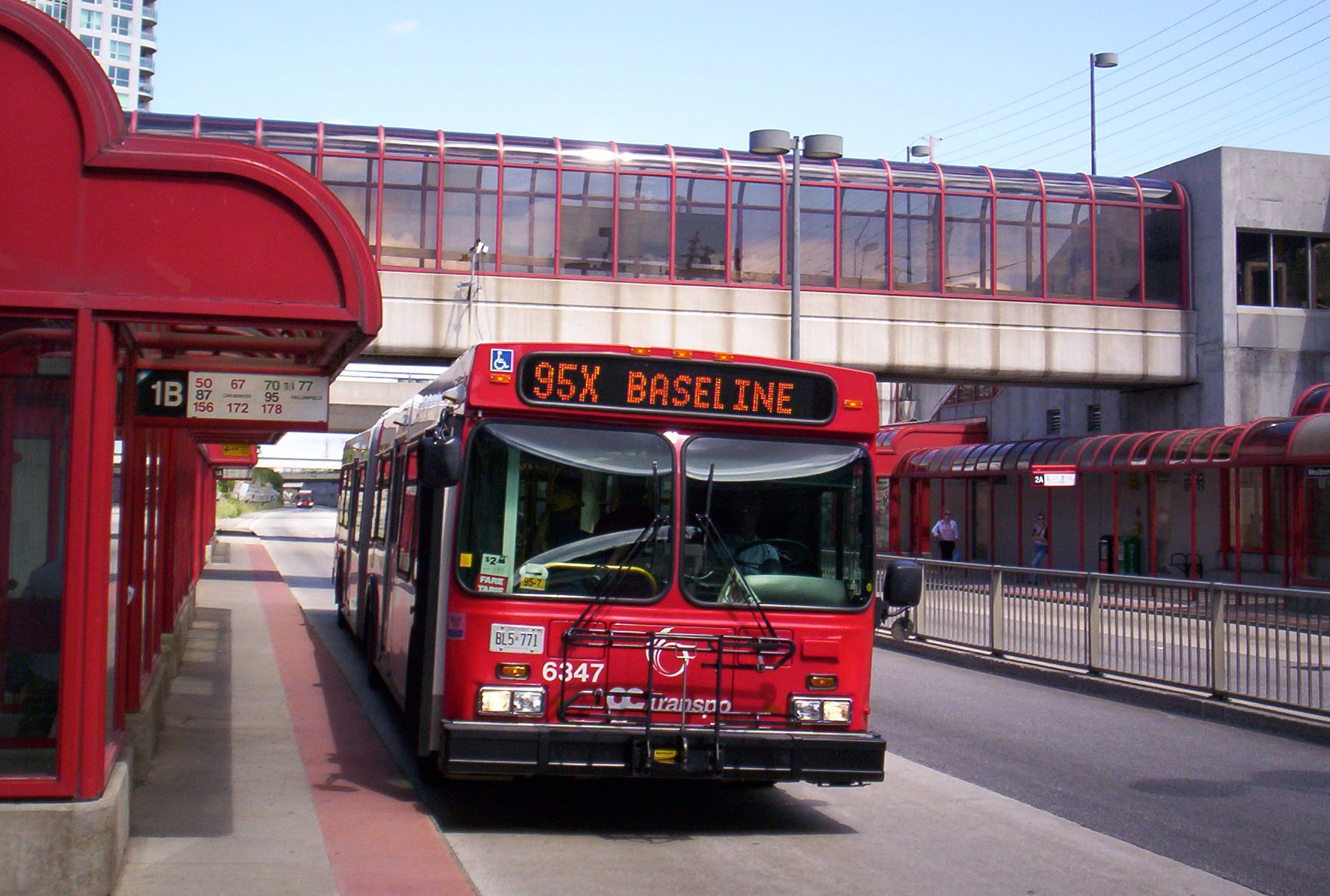
Original Westboro station on Transitway

== Service ==
The following routes serve Westboro station as of April 9, 2024:

Stop	Routes
West O-Train	Under construction (opening in 2027)
East O-Train	Under construction (opening in 2027)
A	57 58 60 61 62 63 66 67 73 74 75 81 82 87 256 261 262 263 265 266 404
B	57 58 60 61 62 63 66 67 73 74 75 81 82 87

Key
Line 1 (O-Train) Line 2 (O-Train) Line 4 (O-Train)	O-Train
E1	Shuttle Express
R1 R2 R4	O-Train replacement bus routes
N75	Night routes
40 12	Frequent routes
99 162	Local routes
275	Connexion routes
303	Shopper routes
405	Event routes
646	School routes
STO	Société de transport de l'Outaouais routes
Additional info: Line 1: Confederation Line; Line 2: Trillium Line; Line 4: Airport Link; Routes 5 to 199: Custom routing that that connects to Line 1 and/or 2; Routes 200 to 299: Connexion (peak-period only routes that connect to the O-Train); Routes 301 to 305: Shopper Routes (limited rural service); Routes 404 to 406: Canadian Tire Centre events; Routes 450 to 456: Lansdowne Park events; Routes 600 to 699: School Routes; Route R1: replaces Line 1 when it is out of service; Route R2: replaces Line 2 when it is out of service; Route R4: replaces Line 4 when it is out of service; Routes N39 to N98: night service (replaces Line 1 and N98 replaces Line 4); White backgrounds: limited service; Last two digits represent service area: 00s and 10s – Central; 20s – Gloucester; 30s – Orléans; 40s – Ottawa East; 50s – Ottawa West; 60s – Kanata, Stittsville; 70s – Barrhaven; 80s – Nepean; 90s – South Keys
