= Lincoln Fields station =

Bus station in Ottawa, Canada

Lincoln Fields
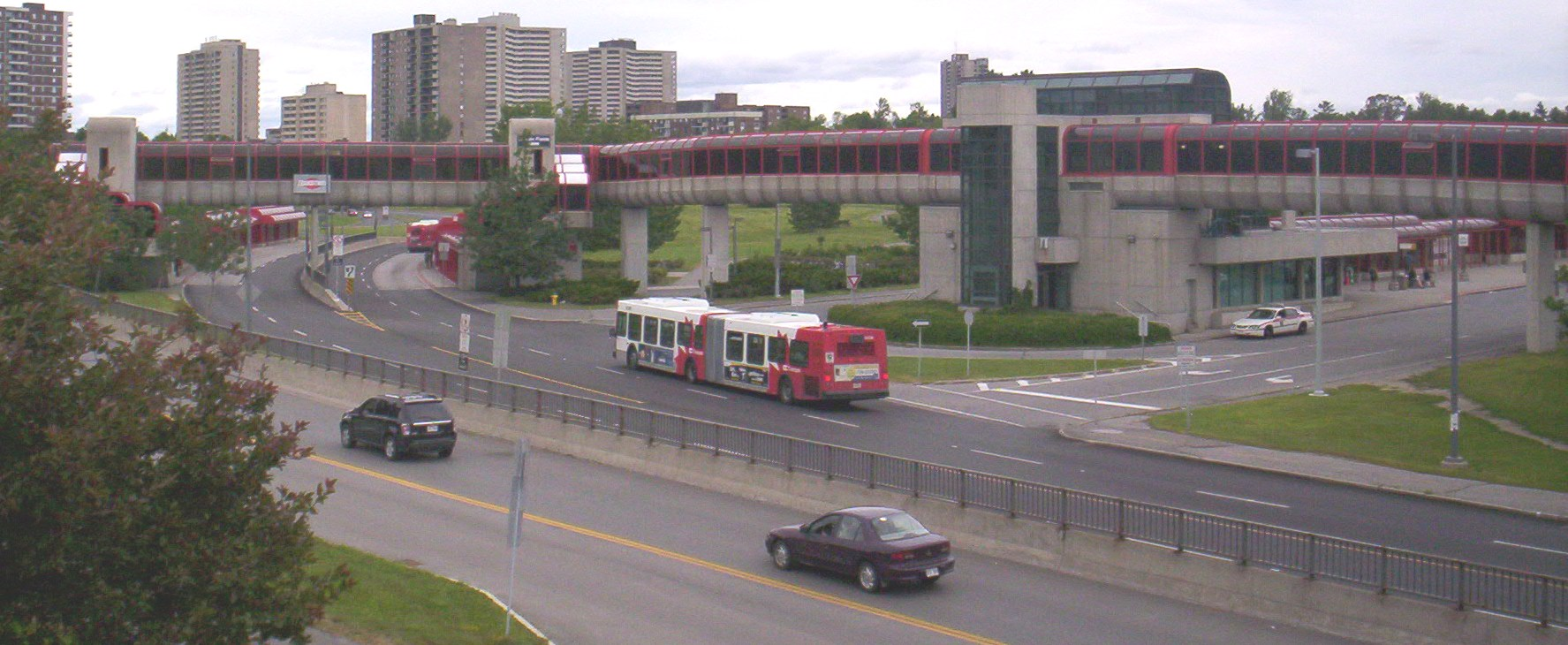

General information
- Coordinates: 45°21′56″N 75°46′58″W
- Owner: OC Transpo

Construction
- Structure type: Trench (LRT station)

Other information
- Station code: 3014

History
- Opened: 1982
- Closed: 2020
- Rebuilt: Under rebuild

Services
Preceding station	OC Transpo	Following station
Bayshore toward Carling Campus	Route 57	Dominion toward Tunney's Pasture
Bayshore toward Abbot POC	Route 58	Dominion toward Tunney's Pasture
Pinecrest One-way operation	Route 61	Dominion toward Tunney's Pasture
Queensway toward Stittsville	Route 61	Dominion toward Tunney's Pasture
Pinecrest One-way operation	Route 62	Dominion toward Tunney's Pasture
Queensway toward Stittsville	Route 62	Dominion toward Tunney's Pasture
Pinecrest One-way operation	Route 63	Dominion toward Tunney's Pasture
Queensway toward Innovation	Route 63	Dominion toward Tunney's Pasture
Queensway toward Limebank	Route 74	Dominion toward Tunney's Pasture
Queensway toward Cambrian	Route 75	Dominion toward Tunney's Pasture

Future services
Preceding station	OC Transpo	Following station
Iris toward Algonquin	Line 1 Opens 2027	New Orchard toward Trim
Queensview toward Moodie	Line 3 Opens 2027	New Orchard toward Trim
Location

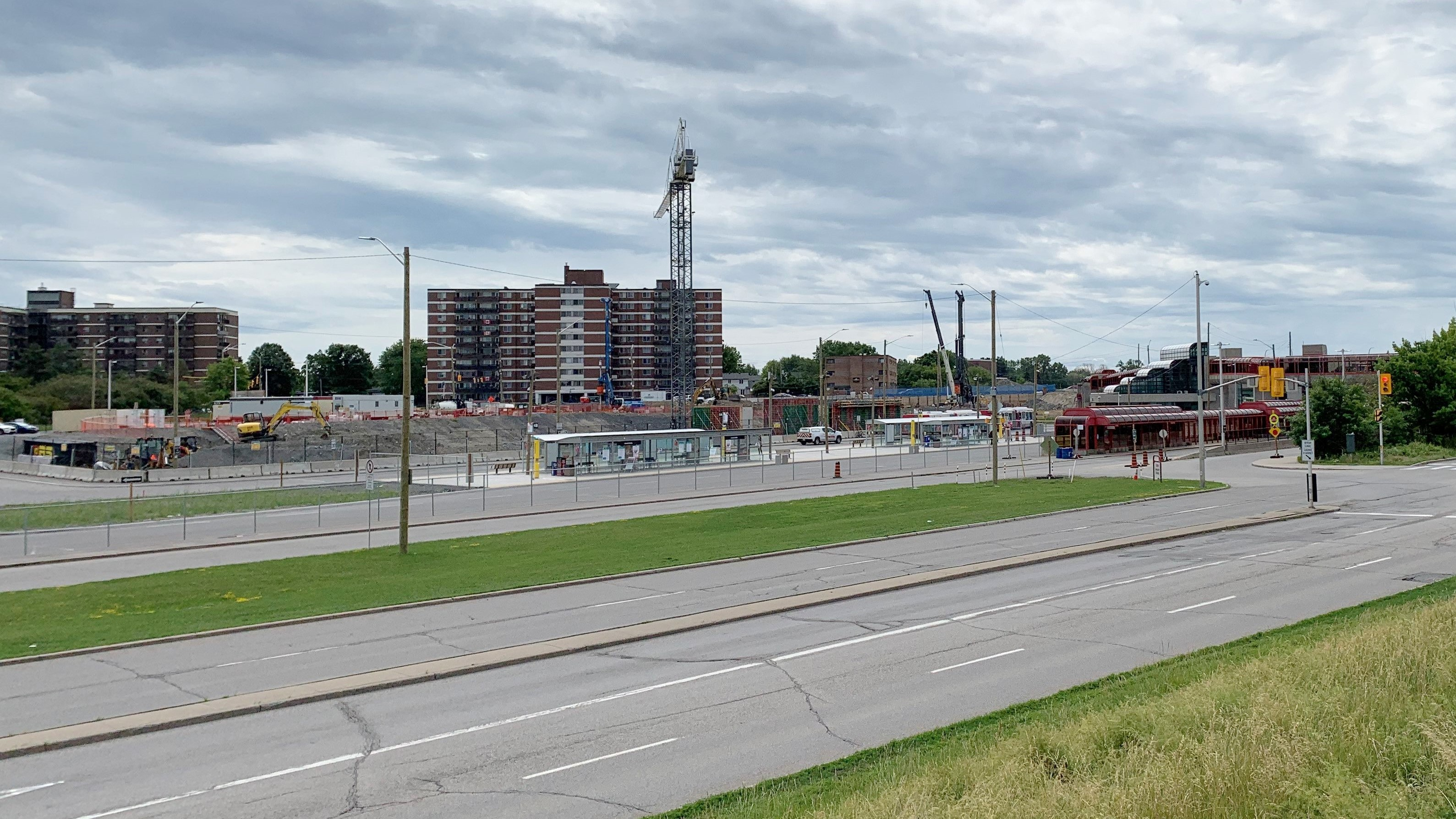
Lincoln Fields station during LRT Stage 2 construction (July 2021)

Lincoln Fields station is a station on Ottawa's transitway located at Carling Avenue and the Kichi Zībī Mīkan. It is adjacent to the now-shuttered Lincoln Fields Shopping Centre. It is the main western hub of the transitway system. Prior to Stage 2 O-Train construction, it had a ticket sales and information office as well as a small convenience store. The transitway routes branch off in two directions: westward to Kanata and Stittsville, and southward to Barrhaven.

The station has two distinct platform areas. One platform area serves main transitway routes 74 and 75 to Baseline station and Barrhaven, as well as routes 61, 62 and 63 to Bayshore station, and Kanata, along with numerous Connexion and peak period routes to the western and southwestern suburbs. A second platform serves routes local routes. Elevated walkways connected the two platforms, however, the elevated walkway is now disconnected from Carling Avenue and served by a temporary pathway from the south side of Carling adjacent the east side of the transitway.

Shopper's bus route 301 (serving Richmond on Mondays), route 303 (serving Carp and Dunrobin on Wednesdays), and route 305 (serving Manotick, Kars, and North Gower on Fridays) travel via Carling Avenue to/from Carlingwood Mall (the terminus for routes 301, 303, and 305).

Connexion routes from Barrhaven, Bells Corners, Stittsville, and Kanata only allow passengers to get off at this station in the morning upon request, but skip it altogether in the afternoon.

On December 6, 2020, the local bus platform at Lincoln Fields Station moved to the north of its original location due to construction work for the future Stage 2 O-Train station.

== Service ==
The following routes serve Lincoln Fields station as of April 27, 2025:

Key
Line 1 (O-Train) Line 2 (O-Train) Line 4 (O-Train)	O-Train
E1	Shuttle Express
R1 R2 R4	O-Train replacement bus routes
N75	Night routes
40 12	Frequent routes
99 162	Local routes
275	Connexion routes
303	Shopper routes
405	Event routes
646	School routes
STO	Société de transport de l'Outaouais routes
Additional info: Line 1: Confederation Line; Line 2: Trillium Line; Line 4: Airport Link; Routes 5 to 199: Custom routing that that connects to Line 1 and/or 2; Routes 200 to 299: Connexion (peak-period only routes that connect to the O-Train); Routes 301 to 305: Shopper Routes (limited rural service); Routes 404 to 406: Canadian Tire Centre events; Routes 450 to 456: Lansdowne Park events; Routes 600 to 699: School Routes; Route R1: replaces Line 1 when it is out of service; Route R2: replaces Line 2 when it is out of service; Route R4: replaces Line 4 when it is out of service; Routes N39 to N98: night service (replaces Line 1 and N98 replaces Line 4); White backgrounds: limited service; Last two digits represent service area: 00s and 10s – Central; 20s – Gloucester; 30s – Orléans; 40s – Ottawa East; 50s – Ottawa West; 60s – Kanata, Stittsville; 70s – Barrhaven; 80s – Nepean; 90s – South Keys

Stop	Routes
North O-Train	Under construction (opening in 2027)
South O-Train	Under construction (opening in 2027)
West O-Train	Under construction (opening in 2027)
1A Transitway West	60 61 62 63 66 67
1B Transitway South	73 74 75 256 261 262 263 265 266 404
2A Transitway East	57 58 60 61 62 63 66 67 73 74 75 82
3A Local	11 51
3B Local	51 85 153 301 303 305
4A Local	57 58 82
4B Local	11 85
5A Carling Ave. West	11 51 57 85 153
