= Eagleson station =

Bus station in Ottawa, Canada

Eagleson
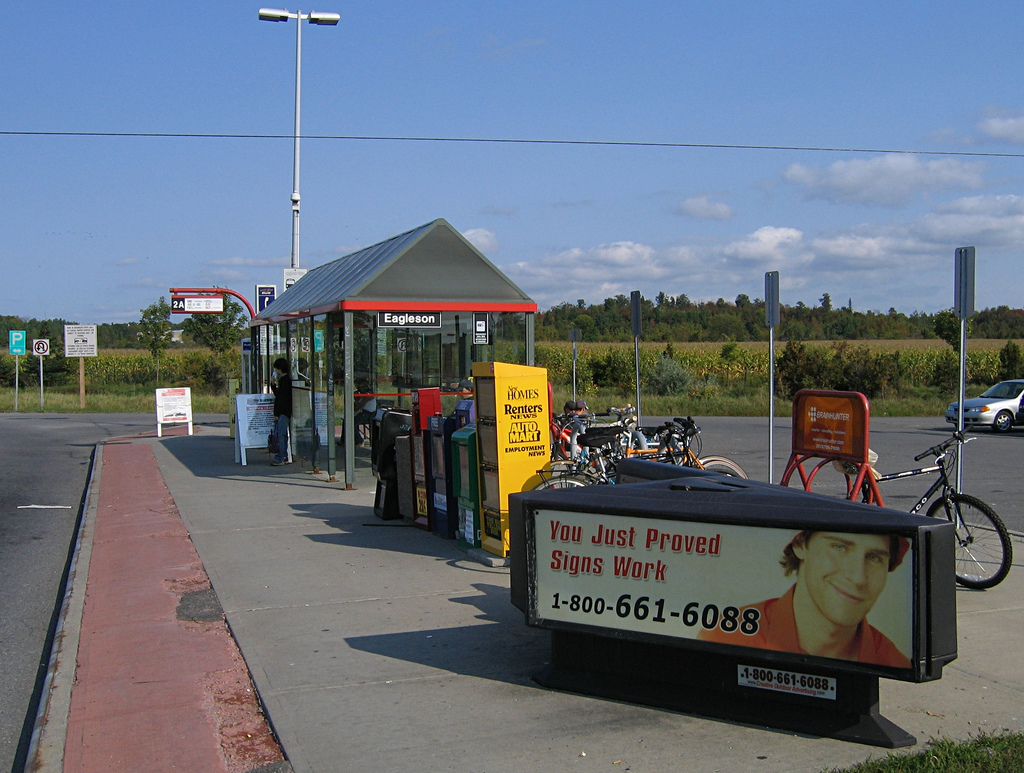

General information
- Coordinates: 45°19′07″N 75°53′02″W
- Owner: OC Transpo

Construction
- Parking: 811 at East Park & Ride; 406 at West Park & Ride

Other information
- Station code: 3055

Services
| Preceding station | OC Transpo | Following station |
|---|---|---|
| Terry Fox toward Stittsville | Route 61 | Moodie toward Tunney's Pasture |
| Teron One-way operation | Route 62 | Moodie toward Tunney's Pasture |
| Teron One-way operation | Route 63 | Moodie toward Tunney's Pasture |
| Teron toward Innovation | Route 110 | CitiGate toward Limebank |
Location

Eagleson is a station on Ottawa, Ontario's transitway served by OC Transpo buses. It is located in the western transitway section at Eagleson Road and Highway 417. Eastbound buses enter the station; westbound buses remain on Eagleson and service is from an adjacent bus stop.

The station also has a large park and ride facility, which was named after a former City of Kanata councillor, Eva James, who died in December, 1995, shortly after its official opening.

A second parking section was later added west of Eagleson Road.

== Service ==
The following routes serve Eagleson station as of April 27, 2025:

Key
| Line 1 (O-Train) Line 2 (O-Train) Line 4 (O-Train) | O-Train |
| E1 | Shuttle Express |
| R1 R2 R4 | O-Train replacement bus routes |
| N75 | Night routes |
| 40 12 | Frequent routes |
| 99 162 | Local routes |
| 275 | Connexion routes |
| 303 | Shopper routes |
| 405 | Event routes |
| 646 | School routes |
| STO | Société de transport de l'Outaouais routes |
Additional info: Line 1: Confederation Line; Line 2: Trillium Line; Line 4: Airport Link; Routes 5 to 199: Custom routing that that connects to Line 1 and/or 2; Routes 200 to 299: Connexion (peak-period only routes that connect to the O-Train); Routes 301 to 305: Shopper Routes (limited rural service); Routes 404 to 406: Canadian Tire Centre events; Routes 450 to 456: Lansdowne Park events; Routes 600 to 699: School Routes; Route R1: replaces Line 1 when it is out of service; Route R2: replaces Line 2 when it is out of service; Route R4: replaces Line 4 when it is out of service; Routes N39 to N98: night service (replaces Line 1 and N98 replaces Line 4); White backgrounds: limited service; Last two digits represent service area: 00s and 10s – Central; 20s – Gloucester; 30s – Orléans; 40s – Ottawa East; 50s – Ottawa West; 60s – Kanata, Stittsville; 70s – Barrhaven; 80s – Nepean; 90s – South Keys

| Stop | Routes |
|---|---|
| 2A Highway 417 East | 60 61 62 63 67 265 301 303 404 454 |
| 2B Highway 417 East | 60 61 62 63 67 265 301 303 404 454 |
| 3A Local South/West | 60 61 67 110 168 301 303 688 |
| 4A Local North | 110 168 688 |

=== Notes ===
1. Rapid route 63 from stop 4A (local north) only operated during morning rush hours on weekdays before June 2021. Since then, these trips were converted to Route 110 trips.
