= Terry Fox station =

Transitway stop in Ottawa, Ontario

Terry Fox
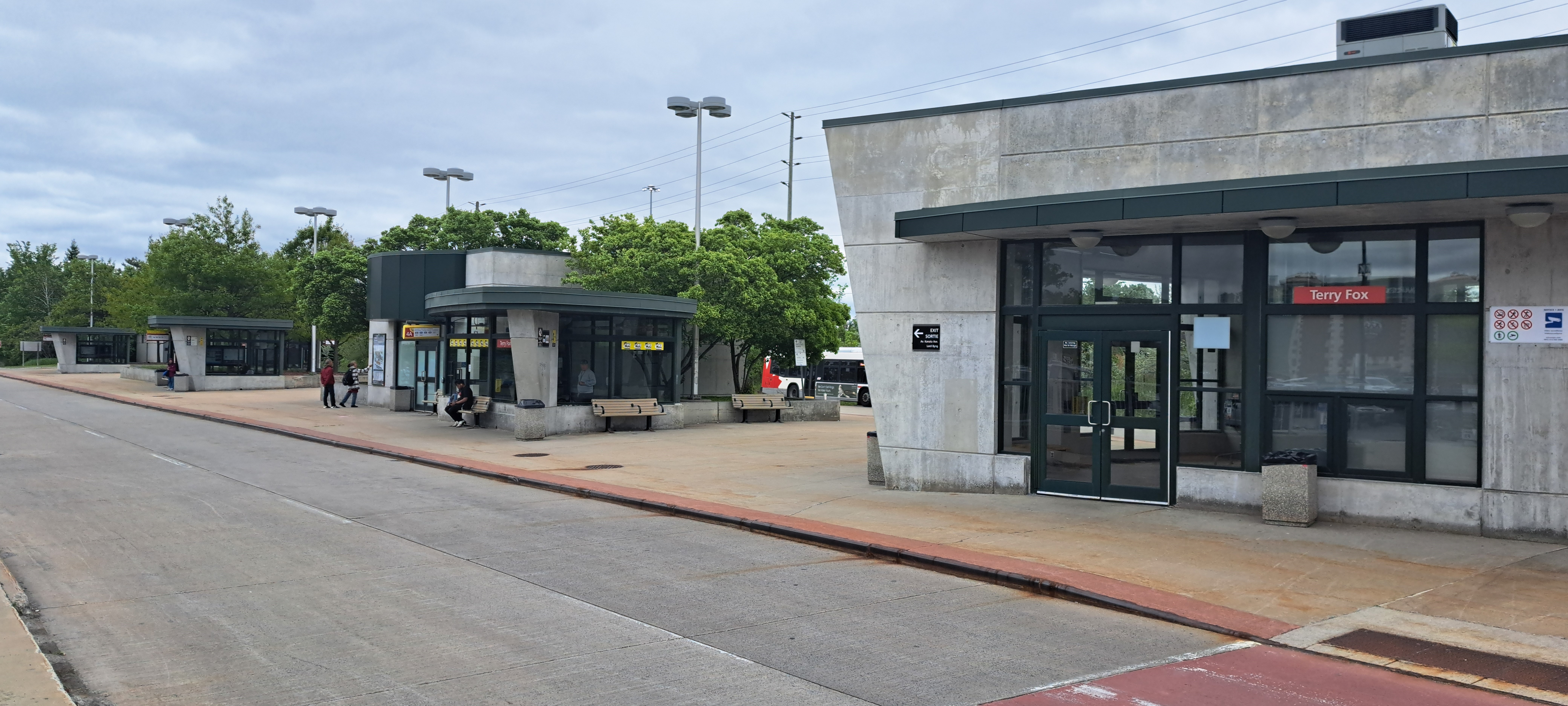

General information
- Coordinates: 45°18′34″N 75°54′24″W
- Owner: OC Transpo
- Connections: Ontario Northland; FlixBus

Construction
- Parking: 515 spaces

Other information
- Station code: 3058

Services
| Preceding station | OC Transpo | Following station |
|---|---|---|
| Stittsville Terminus | Route 61 | Eagleson toward Tunney's Pasture |
| Stittsville Terminus | Route 62 | Teron toward Tunney's Pasture |
Location

Terry Fox station is a bus stop on Ottawa, Ontario's transitway served by OC Transpo buses. It is located in the western transitway section and is the main western terminal of routes 61 and 62 for all trips not extended to/from Stittsville.

It is located adjacent the Kanata Centrum shopping centre at Kanata Avenue and Earl Grey Drive, just east of the Highway 417 exit at Terry Fox Drive. The station entered service in September 2004 with construction still having been underway at that time; it officially opened on February 22, 2005. Before the station's construction, a small terminal was located at Kanata Town Centre, located south of Highway 417 on Katimavik Road.

The station also contains a Park & Ride facility to supplement the often-full Eagleson station.

== Service ==
The following routes serve Terry Fox station:

Key
| Line 1 (O-Train) Line 2 (O-Train) Line 4 (O-Train) | O-Train |
| E1 | Shuttle Express |
| R1 R2 R4 | O-Train replacement bus routes |
| N75 | Night routes |
| 40 12 | Frequent routes |
| 99 162 | Local routes |
| 275 | Connexion routes |
| 303 | Shopper routes |
| 405 | Event routes |
| 646 | School routes |
| STO | Société de transport de l'Outaouais routes |
Additional info: Line 1: Confederation Line; Line 2: Trillium Line; Line 4: Airport Link; Routes 5 to 199: Custom routing that that connects to Line 1 and/or 2; Routes 200 to 299: Connexion (peak-period only routes that connect to the O-Train); Routes 301 to 305: Shopper Routes (limited rural service); Routes 404 to 406: Canadian Tire Centre events; Routes 450 to 456: Lansdowne Park events; Routes 600 to 699: School Routes; Route R1: replaces Line 1 when it is out of service; Route R2: replaces Line 2 when it is out of service; Route R4: replaces Line 4 when it is out of service; Routes N39 to N98: night service (replaces Line 1 and N98 replaces Line 4); White backgrounds: limited service; Last two digits represent service area: 00s and 10s – Central; 20s – Gloucester; 30s – Orléans; 40s – Ottawa East; 50s – Ottawa West; 60s – Kanata, Stittsville; 70s – Barrhaven; 80s – Nepean; 90s – South Keys

| Stop | Routes |
|---|---|
| 3A | Ontario Northland to Pembroke, North Bay, Sudbury |
| 3B | off only |
| 3C South/West | 60 61 62 67 162 163 301 303 404 |
| 4A South/East | 60 61 62 68 165 301 303 454 |
| 4B North | 161 165 168 265 |
| 4C | 646 661 663 688 |

== See also ==
- Kanata, Ontario
