= Bayshore station (Ottawa) =

Bus station in Ottawa, Canada

Bayshore
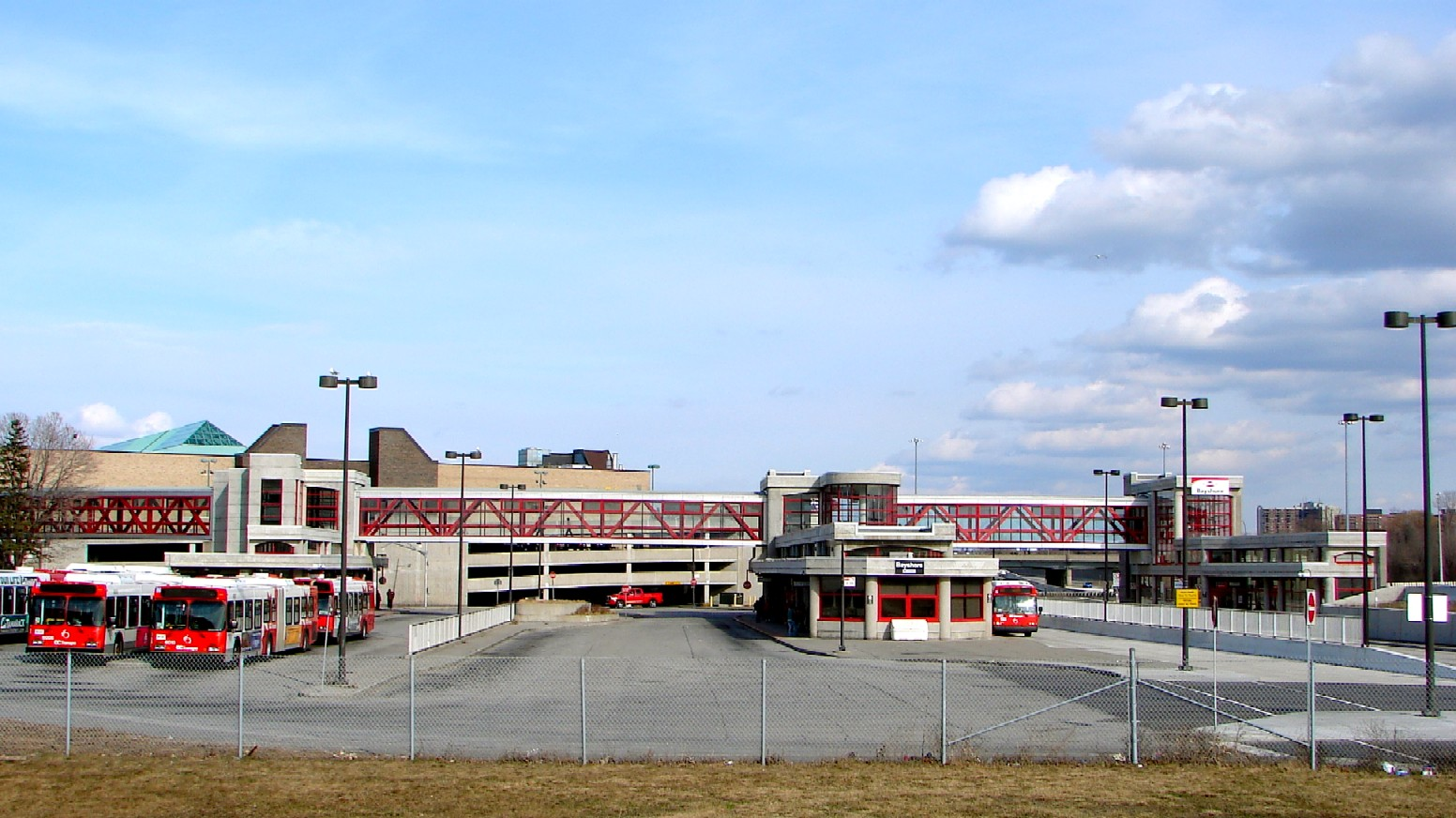

General information
- Location: Ottawa, Ontario; Canada
- Coordinates: 45°20′45″N 75°48′34″W
- Owner: OC Transpo
- Platforms: 2

Construction
- Parking: No
- Cycle facilities: Yes

Other information
- Station code: 3050

History
- Opened: December 14, 2000
- Closed: April 24, 2022
- Rebuilt: Under rebuild

Services
Preceding station	OC Transpo	Following station
Carling Campus Terminus	Route 57	Lincoln Fields toward Tunney's Pasture
Carling Campus toward Abbot POC	Route 58	Lincoln Fields toward Tunney's Pasture
Moodie toward Stittsville	Route 61	Pinecrest toward Tunney's Pasture
Moodie toward Stittsville	Route 62	Pinecrest toward Tunney's Pasture

Future services
Preceding station	OC Transpo	Following station
Moodie Terminus	Line 3 Opens 2027	Pinecrest toward Trim
Location

Bayshore station is a station on the Transitway in Ottawa, Ontario, served by OC Transpo buses. It is located in the West Transitway section at the Bayshore Shopping Centre in the neighbourhood of Bayshore.

Prior to its construction, buses used Woodridge Crescent and entered the shopping centre parking lot, which is prone to congestion and extensive delays.

A second platform allowed rapid routes 61, 62, and 63 to pass through the station via a transitway segment between Pinecrest station and Moodie station, which was originally built in 2009 and later extended towards Moodie in 2017.

On April 24, 2022 the Transitway was closed for construction of the Stage 2 O-Train extension. In addition, the buildings and pedestrian overpass to Bayshore Shopping Centre were closed for construction. It is expected to be completed in early 2027.

== Service ==
The following routes serve Bayshore station as of April 27, 2025:

Key
Line 1 (O-Train) Line 2 (O-Train) Line 4 (O-Train)	O-Train
E1	Shuttle Express
R1 R2 R4	O-Train replacement bus routes
N75	Night routes
40 12	Frequent routes
99 162	Local routes
275	Connexion routes
303	Shopper routes
405	Event routes
646	School routes
STO	Société de transport de l'Outaouais routes
Additional info: Line 1: Confederation Line; Line 2: Trillium Line; Line 4: Airport Link; Routes 5 to 199: Custom routing that that connects to Line 1 and/or 2; Routes 200 to 299: Connexion (peak-period only routes that connect to the O-Train); Routes 301 to 305: Shopper Routes (limited rural service); Routes 404 to 406: Canadian Tire Centre events; Routes 450 to 456: Lansdowne Park events; Routes 600 to 699: School Routes; Route R1: replaces Line 1 when it is out of service; Route R2: replaces Line 2 when it is out of service; Route R4: replaces Line 4 when it is out of service; Routes N39 to N98: night service (replaces Line 1 and N98 replaces Line 4); White backgrounds: limited service; Last two digits represent service area: 00s and 10s – Central; 20s – Gloucester; 30s – Orléans; 40s – Ottawa East; 50s – Ottawa West; 60s – Kanata, Stittsville; 70s – Barrhaven; 80s – Nepean; 90s – South Keys

Stop	Routes
West O-Train	Under construction (opening in 2027)
East O-Train	Under construction (opening in 2027)
A	11 57 58 61 62 81 85 88 454 658 669
B	61 62 63 66 158 256 261 262 263 265 301 303 404 406 660 691
C	57 58 60 67 158 301 303 658 660 669
