= Moodie station =

Local public transportation stop in Ottawa, Canada

Moodie
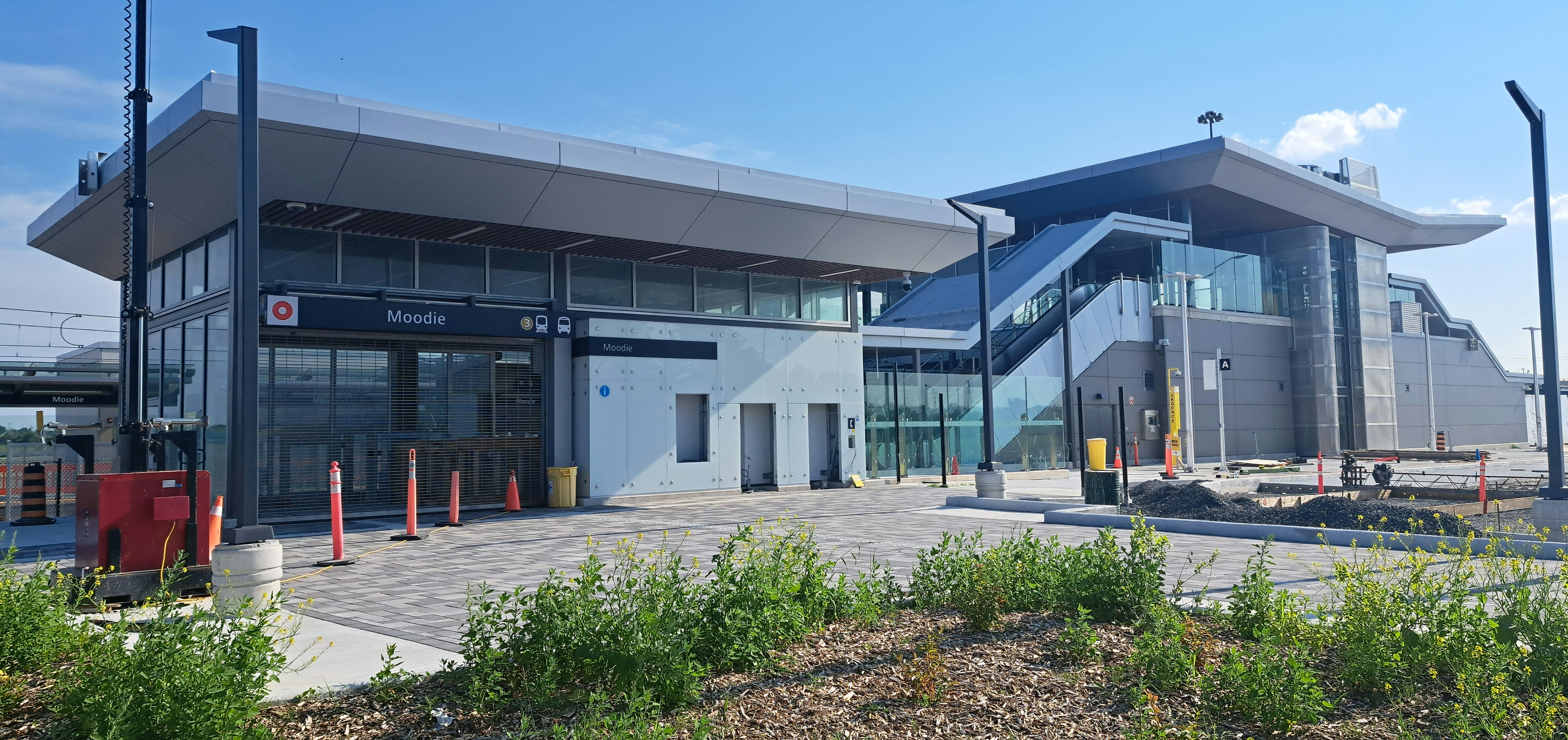

General information
- Location: Moodie Drive, Ottawa, Ontario; Canada
- Owner: OC Transpo

Other information
- Station code: 3042

History
- Opened: December 24, 2017; 8 years ago

Services
Preceding station	OC Transpo	Following station
Eagleson toward Stittsville	Route 61	Bayshore toward Tunney's Pasture
Teron toward Stittsville	Route 62	Bayshore toward Tunney's Pasture
Eagleson One-way operation	Route 62	Bayshore toward Tunney's Pasture
Teron toward Innovation	Route 63	Bayshore toward Tunney's Pasture
Eagleson One-way operation	Route 63	Bayshore toward Tunney's Pasture

Future services
Preceding station	OC Transpo	Following station
Terminus	Line 3 Opens 2027	Bayshore toward Trim

Moodie station is an OC Transpo bus station and future O-Train terminus in Ottawa, Ontario, Canada, located in the western transitway section near the interchange of Moodie Drive and Highway 417 near Crystal Beach. The station opened on December 24, 2017 as a bus rapid transit (BRT) station, with later plans to convert it to light rail transit (LRT).

== Service ==
The following routes serve Moodie station as of April 27, 2025:

Key
Line 1 (O-Train) Line 2 (O-Train) Line 4 (O-Train)	O-Train
E1	Shuttle Express
R1 R2 R4	O-Train replacement bus routes
N75	Night routes
40 12	Frequent routes
99 162	Local routes
275	Connexion routes
303	Shopper routes
405	Event routes
646	School routes
STO	Société de transport de l'Outaouais routes
Additional info: Line 1: Confederation Line; Line 2: Trillium Line; Line 4: Airport Link; Routes 5 to 199: Custom routing that that connects to Line 1 and/or 2; Routes 200 to 299: Connexion (peak-period only routes that connect to the O-Train); Routes 301 to 305: Shopper Routes (limited rural service); Routes 404 to 406: Canadian Tire Centre events; Routes 450 to 456: Lansdowne Park events; Routes 600 to 699: School Routes; Route R1: replaces Line 1 when it is out of service; Route R2: replaces Line 2 when it is out of service; Route R4: replaces Line 4 when it is out of service; Routes N39 to N98: night service (replaces Line 1 and N98 replaces Line 4); White backgrounds: limited service; Last two digits represent service area: 00s and 10s – Central; 20s – Gloucester; 30s – Orléans; 40s – Ottawa East; 50s – Ottawa West; 60s – Kanata, Stittsville; 70s – Barrhaven; 80s – Nepean; 90s – South Keys

Stop	Routes
East O-Train	Under construction (opening in 2027)
A Transitway East	61 62 63 158 301 454
B Highway 417 West	61 62 63 256 261 262 263 265 266 301 303 404 406
C Local South	58 60 66 67 158
D Local North	60 66 67
E Local East	58
