= Kanata Town Centre =

Office building in Ottawa, Canada

Coordinates: 45.3125406°N 75.895679°W

- Interactive map of the Kanata Town Centre area

General information
- Location: 150 Katimavik Road, Ottawa, Ontario, Canada
- Current tenants: Food Basics
- Opened: August 19, 1981; 44 years ago

Technical details
- Floor area: 10,000 square metres (110,000 ft^{2})

Design and construction
- Developer: Campeau Corporation
- Known for: Former Kanata City Hall

Other information
- Public transit: 61

The Kanata Town Centre is a three-storey office building with a smaller one-storey retail component in the city of Ottawa, Ontario, Canada. It is located at 150 Katimavik Road, south of Highway 417, in the Katimavik-Hazeldean community of the Kanata area. It contains approximately 10,000 square metres (110,000 ft^{2}) of gross floor area. Once intended as the first phase of a central business district for the (then) City of Kanata, the focal point of the planned commercial core for Kanata was later shifted to lands to the north of Highway 417. The office component of the Kanata Town Centre served as the City of Kanata's first permanent city hall.

== History ==
In 1978, March Township was amalgamated with parts of Goulbourn Township and of Nepean Township to form the new City of Kanata. Prior to the amalgamation, March Township Council proposed the development a new "Town Centre", located in the geographic centre of the urban portion of the new municipality, to serve as a new retail and office core for what would become Kanata. Before the plans for the first phase of the proposed Town Centre were completed, Goulbourn Township approved a competing proposal for a new shopping centre, later named Hazeldean Mall, in the part of Goulbourn that would be joining the new municipality. March Township Council initiated legal action, ultimately unsuccessful, to significantly reduce the size of the Hazeldean Mall development on the grounds that it would adversely affect the market potential of the Town Centre.

The first phase of the Kanata Town Centre was developed by Campeau Corporation and opened on August 19, 1981, almost two years after the opening of the much larger Hazeldean Mall. The main tenants in the mall component of the Town Centre were a Loblaws supermarket, a Boots pharmacy, a Brewers Retail outlet and a Cineplex cinema. The City of Kanata's municipal offices and Council chamber were located in the office component. All of these tenants, except the supermarket (now a Food Basics), have since relocated elsewhere.

The lands surrounding the Kanata Town Centre building remained largely undeveloped. In 2000, the City of Kanata approved a plan to shift the focus on the city's town centre central business district to lands to the north, on the other side of Highway 417 and away from the existing Kanata Town Centre building. The town centre developments to the north initially consisted mainly of big-box store retail development, but subsequent phases included the more pedestrian-oriented urban development originally contemplated for Kanata's core.

== Transportation ==
The OC Transpo transit hub was moved from the Kanata Town Centre north to the big-box Kanata Centrum retail centre in 2005 with the construction of Terry Fox Station. Rapid-transit route 96 and local route 168 continued to stop at the building entrance of the Kanata Town Centre until 20 April 2014, when OC Transpo stopped diverting buses onto the Town Centre property. Both routes were still available on nearby Katimavik Road until 28 June 2015, when route 168 was re-routed through Beaverbrook and Marchwood-Lakeside. As of 2021, service to Kanata Town Centre is via Route 61, from Tunney's Pasture and Stittsville.

=== Intercity bus ===
Kanata Town Centre served as a Greyhound bus (passenger and cargo) pick-up and drop-off until 2016, when Greyhound service moved to Terry Fox station. Ontario Northland's Bus 807 and 806 to Pembroke, North Bay, Sudbury and Sault Ste. Marie stopped at Kanata Town Centre until June 2021, when the stop was moved to Terry Fox Station.
