= Bayshore station =

Bayshore station may refer to:

- Bayshore station (Ottawa), a bus terminal in Ottawa, Ontario, Canada
- Bayshore station (Caltrain), a railway station in San Francisco, California, United States
- Bayshore MRT station, a MRT station in Singapore
- Bay Shore station, a railway station in Bay Shore, New York, United States
