= Line 3 (O-Train) =

Light rail line in Ottawa, Ontario

Overview
- Status: Under construction
- Owner: City of Ottawa
- Locale: Ottawa, Ontario
- Stations: 27 (23 shared with Line 1)
- Website: Line 3 (OC Transpo)

Service
- Type: Light rail
- System: O-Train
- Depots: Corkstown Yard; Belfast Yard
- Rolling stock: Citadis Spirit

History
- Planned opening: 2027

Technical
- Line length: 39.5 km (25 mi)
- Character: At-grade, underground
- Track gauge: 1,435 mm (4 ft 8 1/2 in) standard gauge
- Electrification: 1,500 V DC from overhead catenary
- Signalling: Thales SelTrac CBTC

Line 3 (French: Ligne 3) is an under-construction light rail line of the O-Train network in Ottawa, Ontario. It is expected to open in 2027.

== History ==
In November 2013, the City of Ottawa released its new transportation master plan, which included plans to build 35 kilometres (22 mi) of new rapid transit and 19 new stations. This also included plans to extend the Confederation Line westward to Bayshore station. In February 2017, the city announced an extension westward to Moodie Drive from Bayshore station. This totals an extension of 11 stations and 15 kilometres (9.3 mi) westward. Stage 2 will add a new light maintenance and storage facility along Corkstown Road, west of Moodie station.

Construction on Line 3 began in the second quarter of 2019, as the first segment of Line 1 became operational. While the western expansion of the O-Train was initially expected to be complete by 2026, the city stated in August 2024 that the full system could be operational by 2027. Construction is currently ongoing, for implementation of the city's plan to address the current gap in service between Dominion station and Lincoln Fields station where buses travel on the Kichi Zibi Mikan a little over 4 kilometres (2.5 mi) without stopping. The plan calls for burying trains for most of the route, creating a shorter, straighter alignment. The new route will also include two new LRT stations in an urban area with intensification opportunities.

The line was initially considered to be part of the Confederation Line but was given its own number and colour in November 2020.

== Route and stations ==
=== Route ===
Line 3 will run parallel to Line 1 for most of its route, splitting at Lincoln Fields and continuing west towards Moodie.

=== Stations ===
Line 3 will feature 27 stations, from Trim in the east to Moodie in the west. 23 of the stations will be shared with Line 1.

Station	Notes
Stage 2 West
Westboro	Will replace the existing Transitway station. Serves high-density residential and Westboro Village
Kichi Zìbì	Will replace Dominion station. The station will be renamed Kichi Zìbì to better associate with the region's Algonquin heritage, the nearby Kitchissippi lookout and the City ward of the same name.
Sherbourne	New station will be below-grade, built as part of a cut-and-cover tunnel along the Byron Linear Tramway Park at Sherbourne Road
New Orchard	New station will be below-grade, built as part of a cut-and-cover tunnel along the Byron Linear Tramway Park near New Orchard Avenue
Lincoln Fields	Will replace the existing Transitway station. This station will be a major transfer point between lines 1 and 3. It will include a fare-paid transfer zone as well as public washrooms.
Queensview	Will be located near OC Transpo's Pinecrest garage between Queensview drive and the 417. A pedestrian bridge across the 417 is also being constructed to directly link to the station; although it will be completed before the LRT is operational, it will not be open to the public until the beginning of train service.
Pinecrest	Will be located just west of Pinecrest Road and south of the existing Transitway station
Bayshore	Will replace the existing Transitway station
Moodie	Will replace the newly built Transitway station. A new maintenance and storage facility will be built beyond this station on the west side of Moodie Drive.
Stage 2 East
Montréal	Will replace existing at-grade Transitway request stops and be built across Montreal Road in a newly constructed and widened Regional Road 174 overpass
Jeanne d'Arc	Will replace the existing station and be built in the median of Highway 174 below Jeanne d'Arc Boulevard
Convent Glen	New station will be built in the median of the 174 below Orléans Boulevard
Place d'Orléans	Will replace existing Transitway station and be built in the median of the 174 and connect to the existing pedestrian bridge to connect to the Park and Ride and the Place d'Orleans Shopping Centre. This will be a major transfer station for riders living in Orléans and it will include a fare-paid transfer zone, with an additional pedestrian overpass constructed to provide direct between the bus and train platforms in the zone. It will also include public washrooms.
Trim	Will be located in the median of the 174 and connect to the existing park-and-ride south of the 174 via a new pedestrian bridge. In the longer term, there are plans to construct an additional pedestrian bridge to link the station with the communities north of the 174.

=== Long-term expansion plans ===
Station	Notes
Wesley Clover Parks	A future side platform station is protected along the guideway being constructed for the Stage 2 West expansion, west of the terminus at Moodie station and in close proximity to the Moodie Yard LMSF. If constructed, it would be used for special events only at Wesley Clover Parks on the other side of Corkstown Road.
