= Kichi Zibi Mikan =

Parkway in Ottawa, Ontario, Canada

Kichi Zībī Mīkan
- English: Great River Road; French: route de la grande rivière
- Formerly: Sir John A. Macdonald Parkway; Ottawa River Parkway
- Kichi Zībī Mīkan highlighted in red
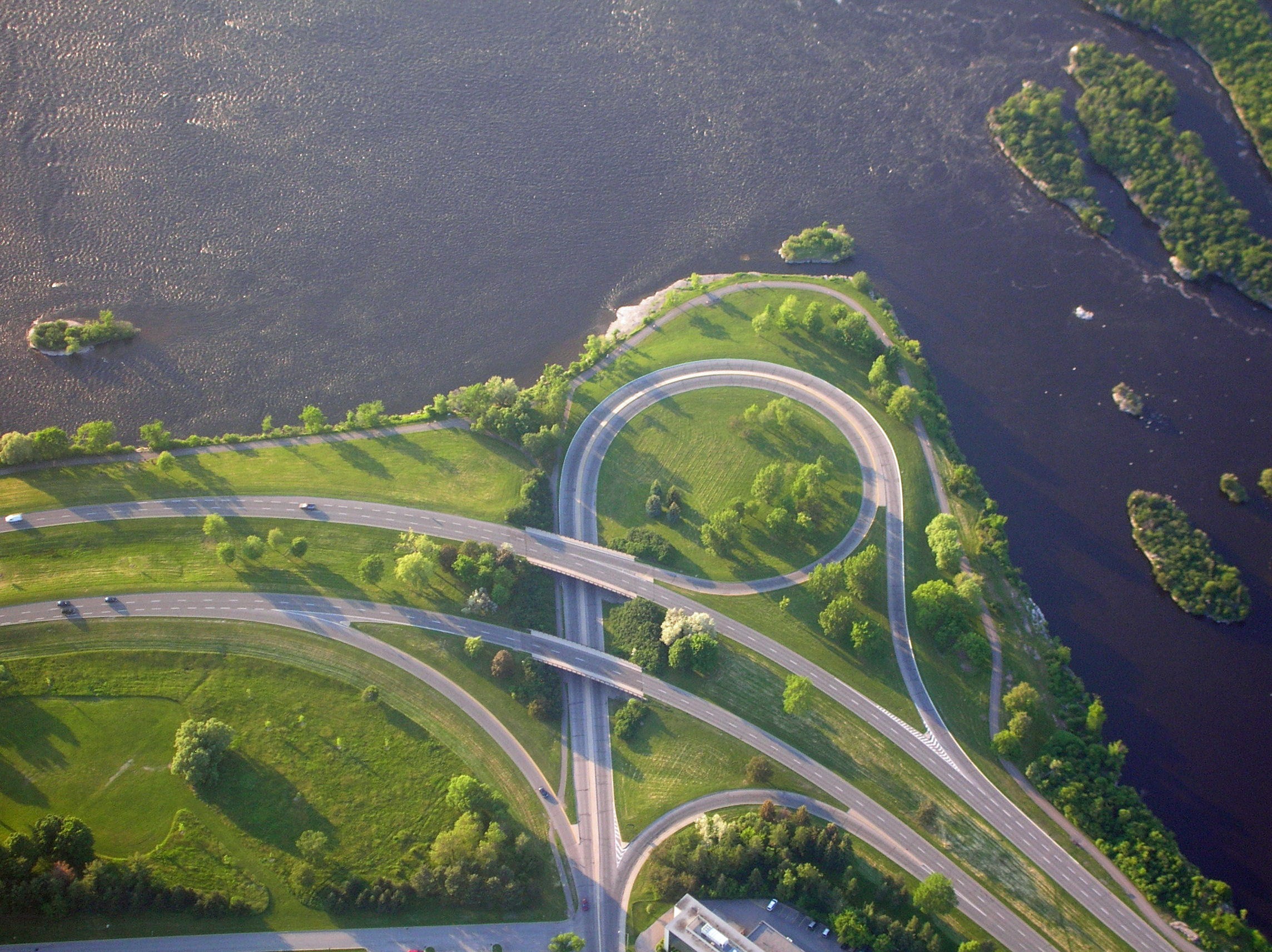
- Interchange with Parkdale Avenue

Route information
- Maintained by National Capital Commission
- Length: 9.4 km (5.8 mi)

Major junctions
- West end: Carling Avenue
- East end: Booth Street

Location
- Country: Canada
- Province: Ontario
- Major cities: Ottawa

Highway system
- NCC parkways in Ottawa
(in alphabetical order)
← Island Park Drive	Kichi Zibi Mīkan	Queen Elizabeth Driveway →

The Kichi Zībī Mīkan, (Note: In the Algonquin language, the macron ( ˉ ) represents a long vowel. Other writers use a grave accent ( ` ) or drop the diacritic entirely.) (/ˈkɪtʃɪ ziːbiː ˈmiːkʌn/ ki-chi zee-bee MEE-kun) formerly the Sir John A. Macdonald Parkway, and previously the Ottawa River Parkway, is a four-lane scenic parkway along the Ottawa River in Ottawa, Ontario, Canada. It runs from Carling Avenue near Connaught Avenue, to Booth Street at the Canadian War Museum and National Holocaust Monument. It is maintained by the National Capital Commission. The speed limit is 60 km/h (37 mph). Bicycles are allowed on the road and on a parallel recreational path along the parkway.

Besides being a scenic route, it serves as a commuter artery for westend residents who work in the downtown area, particularly government employees who work at the Tunney's Pasture office complex, and other areas. It is also used by the transit systems of Ottawa and Gatineau for express buses.

== Route description ==
The parkway begins with on and off-ramps from Carling Avenue. The interchange is also the site of the Lincoln Fields Transitway station, with access driveways for OC Transpo buses. The parkway proceeds north, passing under Richmond Road, then curving eastward along the Ottawa River. The parkway follows the shore, with both directions separated by a grass median. The area along the river is mostly cleared of trees, allowing a view of the River and far shore line. The area to the south is partially forested, separating the roadway from residential areas to the south.

Approximately 1 kilometre (1,100 yd) from the start of the parkway, is the Deschenes Rapids scenic lookout area. Driveways connect the two directions of the parkway to the area, which has a small parking lot and picnic areas. The road meets Woodroffe Avenue a few hundred metres east. Northbound Woodroffe Avenue traffic joins the parkway's eastbound lanes, while traffic from both directions of the parkway are allowed onto southbound Woodroffe.

The roadway continues east along the river shore until a signalized intersection with the OC Transpo Transitway. From this point east, the roadway is for the exclusive use of non-commercial vehicles and bicycles. The parkway follows the river bank to the north, while the Transitway diverges east along an old railway right-of-way.

The next landmark on the parkway is Kitchissipi Lookout and Beach. The beach is also known as Westboro Beach. The parkway passes over a pedestrian access walkway from the residential area to the east, with an intersection to the beach parking area. The beach is provided with a pavilion overlooking the River and the beach, which has changing rooms and a restaurant patio.

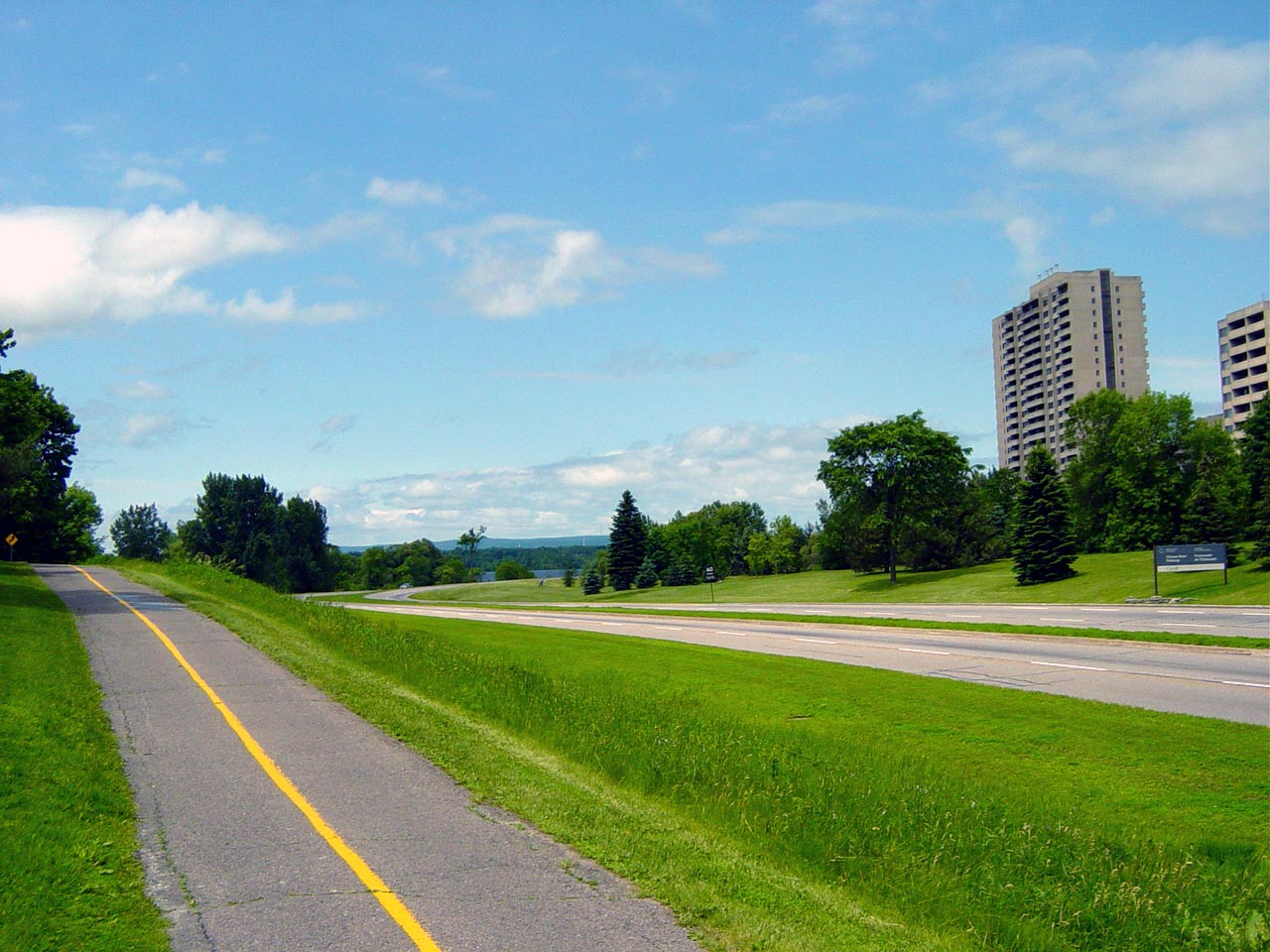
Bike path beside the parkway.

The parkway curves east and proceeds to a large intersection with Island Park Drive. Island Park connects north to Gatineau across a series of bridges and a park over the Ottawa River. The intersection's traffic lights are controlled to provide turning signals. Just east of the intersection is another park and lookout area, provided with driveways to a parking lot near the river.

The parkway continues east until a signalized intersection for access to the Tunney's Pasture campus of the federal government. An extra turning lane is provided to access the large parking lot of the campus. Further east, the parkway passes over Parkdale Avenue, with on and off-ramps between Parkdale and the parkway. A signalized intersection is provided to the east providing access to the Mechanicsville neighbourhood to the south, and Lemieux Island and its park and filtration station to the north, along an unnamed roadway. Access to and from the parkway and this intersection is only allowed during off-peak hours.

The parkway continues east along the shore of Nepean Bay and into the LeBreton Flats area. The parkway ends at Vimy Place, which is the roadway to around Lebreton Flats to get to the Museum of War. East of MacDonald Park at Vimy Place is the beginning of Wellington Street, which belongs to the City of Ottawa.

Use by buses

It is closed to commercial traffic, so the majority of vehicles are private cars. From Lincoln Fields to Dominion stations, it shares traffic with the Transitway rapid-bus network, as well as STO buses from Gatineau (between Tunney's Pasture and the Champlain Bridge).

Summer Sunday closures

On Sundays during summer months (Victoria Day to Labour Day), the parkway's westbound lanes are closed to motor vehicles and opened to pedestrian and bicycle traffic from 9 am until 1 pm.

Winter Trail

In 2016, the NCC approved a proposal to turn the parallel recreational path into a mixed use winter trail for cross country skiing, walking, snowshoeing and biking. The trail was an instant success and has since been expanded to cover a distance of 16 kilometres (9.9 mi) stretching from the Canadian War Museum down to Westboro Beach. The winter trail is now in its fourth season and is jointly managed by the groomer (Dave Adams) and Dovercourt Recreation Centre.

== History ==
The River Parkway was first proposed as part of Greber Plans for Ottawa in the 1940s. The parkway was built by purchasing former rail lands along the waterfront, and the purchase of private riverfront houses. The Parkway was designed as a scenic drive, with commercial vehicles prohibited. At the time of its construction, Carling Avenue was part of Ontario Highway 17, and the Parkway provided an alternative, scenic drive to the parliamentary precinct. When the Queensway freeway was constructed the River Parkway was not extended to the Queensway, and access from the Queensway is marked from the Richmond Road interchange.

In the 1990s, the expansion of the bridge at Island Park was a major issue. The National Capital Commission proposed a fully grade-separated interchange to the River Parkway, with a major expansion in capacity of the bridge over the river. Organized opposition in Ottawa to the plans led to a reduced plan by the NCC. The bridge is three lanes, with the direction of the middle lane switched during different hours of the day. The NCC also built a signalized intersection at Tunney's Pasture at the time.

The construction of the new Canada War Museum on Booth Street was done in conjunction with a re-routing of the section of the River Parkway in the area. The River Parkway's original route parallelled the river bank, bypassing the Lebreton Flats area, passing over Booth Street on an overpass, terminating at the Portage Bridge intersection. The War Museum now occupies the riverside location of the old Parkway. The new route connects from just south-west of the Portage Bridge intersection, along a route several hundred metres to the south, passing through Lebreton Flats and intersecting with area streets at signalized intersections. The intersection with Booth Street prohibits turns from Booth Street onto the River Parkway.

In 2015, the NCC and the City of Ottawa reached an agreement to run the light rail under a reconstructed and realigned Sir John A. Macdonald Parkway, from what will be Dominion to Cleary stations (East to West, roughly between present-day Churchill Avenue and Cleary Avenue).

=== Name debate ===
In 2012, the Ottawa River Parkway was renamed to honour Canada's first prime minister, John A. Macdonald. Foreign Affairs Minister John Baird, MP for Ottawa West-Nepean, announced the change on August 15, 2012. The renaming followed a grassroots campaign led by author and historian Bob Plamondon and future mayor Mark Sutcliffe. It was part of a process engaged in by the government of Stephen Harper of renaming sites in the National Capital Region after prominent former members of the Conservative and Progressive Conservative parties of Canada. On January 11, 2012, the former Wellington Street Bank of Montreal had been also renamed the Sir John A. Macdonald Building.

The name change, however, was not without some controversy. In June 2021, after the discovery of a large number of potential unmarked graves at Kamloops Indian Residential School, city councillors Catherine McKenney, Jeff Leiper, and Theresa Kavanagh wrote to the federal government, asking they remove Macdonald's name from the parkway and find a new name based on consultations with local First Nations. The parkway is located on the traditional lands of the Algonquin peoples.

On January 19, 2023, the Board of Directors of the NCC voted "to rename the Sir John A. Macdonald Parkway on the basis of an Indigenous naming and engagement exercise… aligned with the principles of the new NCC Toponymy Policy", to be concluded by the fourth quarter of 2023. On June 22, 2023, the NCC officially renamed the parkway Kichi Zibi Mikan, which means 'Great River Road' or 'Ottawa River Path' (in effect a variation of the road’s previous name). New signage was unveiled on September 29, 2023, the day before the National Day of Truth and Reconciliation.

== Exit list ==
The following table lists the major junctions along Kichi Zibi Mikan. The entire route is located in Ottawa. All exits are unnumbered.

km	mi	Destinations	Notes
0	0.0	Carling Avenue	
1	0.62	SW Transitway	Buses-only exit; westbound exit and eastbound entrance
3	1.9	Deschenes Rapids	Park access intersection to access riverside trail and parking
3	1.9	Woodroffe Avenue, Ottawa Road 15	At-grade intersection without traffic lights; no westbound access
5	3.1	Transitway	Buses-only exit; eastbound exit and west entrance
5	3.1	Kitchissipi Lookout	Park access intersection to access riverside trail, parking, and beach
6	3.7	Island Park Drive	At-grade intersection with traffic lights
6	3.7	Park Access	Park access intersection to access riverside trail and parking
8	5.0	Tunney's Pasture/Park Access	Access to Goldenrod Street (Tunney's Pasture) to the south, riverside trail and parking to the north
8	5.0	Parkdale Avenue, Ottawa Road 71	Trumpet Interchange
8	5.0	Slidell Street/River Street (not signed)	Northbound is access to Lemieux Island; southbound is access to Laroche Park, Mechanicsville, Hintonburg
9	5.6	Vimy Place	Wellington Street continues east
1.000 mi = 1.609 km; 1.000 km = 0.621 mi

== See also ==
- Airport Parkway
- Aviation Parkway
- Sir George-Étienne Cartier Parkway
