= Innovation station =

Bus station in Ottawa, Canada

Innovation
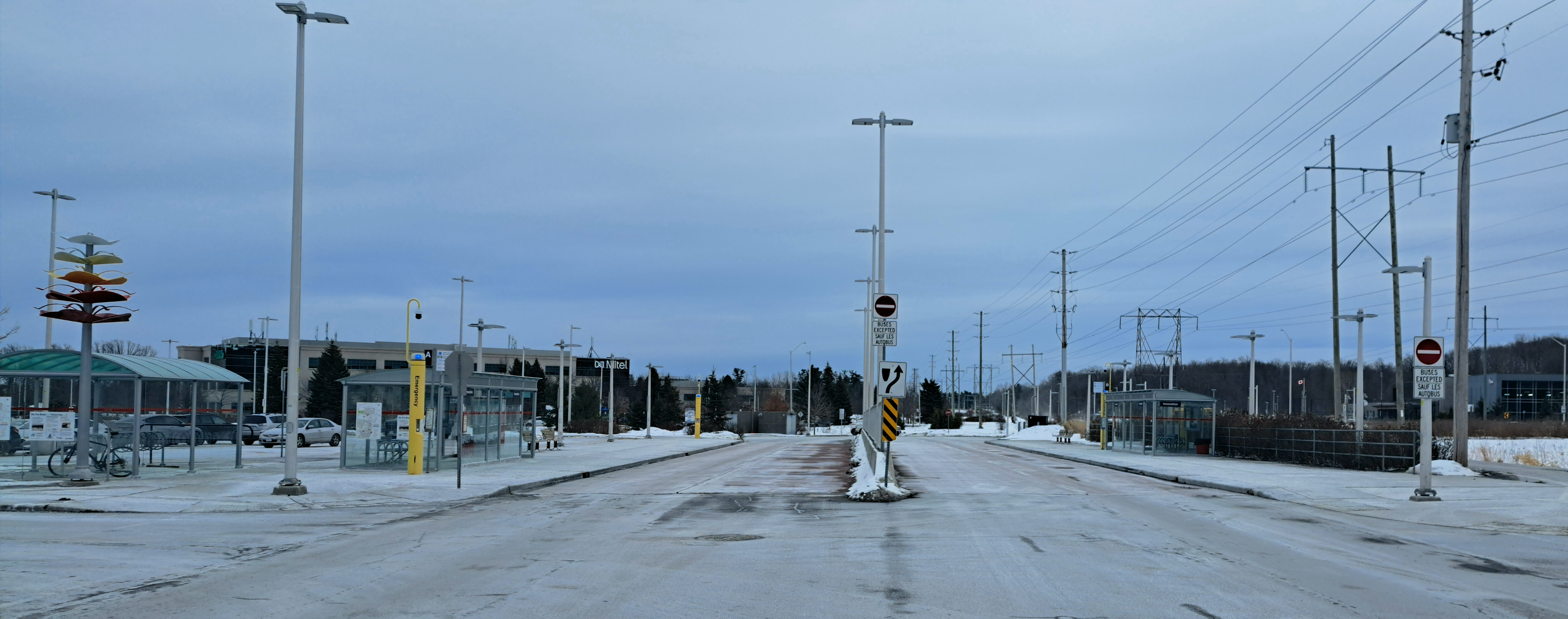

General information
- Coordinates: 45.3434°N 75.9311°W
- Owner: OC Transpo

Construction
- Parking: 246 (480 more planned)

Other information
- Station code: 3057

History
- Opened: December 2016

Services
Preceding station	OC Transpo	Following station
Terminus	Route 63	Teron toward Tunney's Pasture
Terminus	Route 110	Teron toward Limebank
Location

Innovation is a bus stop on Ottawa, Ontario's transitway. It is served by OC Transpo buses and is named after nearby Innovation Drive in the Kanata North Technology Park. Its primary purpose is as a park and ride facility for those in north Kanata. It opened in December 2016 for the 2016 winter service change and is served by rapid route 63.

== Service ==
The following routes serve Innovation station as of April 27, 2025:

Key
Line 1 (O-Train) Line 2 (O-Train) Line 4 (O-Train)	O-Train
E1	Shuttle Express
R1 R2 R4	O-Train replacement bus routes
N75	Night routes
40 12	Frequent routes
99 162	Local routes
275	Connexion routes
303	Shopper routes
405	Event routes
646	School routes
STO	Société de transport de l'Outaouais routes
Additional info: Line 1: Confederation Line; Line 2: Trillium Line; Line 4: Airport Link; Routes 5 to 199: Custom routing that that connects to Line 1 and/or 2; Routes 200 to 299: Connexion (peak-period only routes that connect to the O-Train); Routes 301 to 305: Shopper Routes (limited rural service); Routes 404 to 406: Canadian Tire Centre events; Routes 450 to 456: Lansdowne Park events; Routes 600 to 699: School Routes; Route R1: replaces Line 1 when it is out of service; Route R2: replaces Line 2 when it is out of service; Route R4: replaces Line 4 when it is out of service; Routes N39 to N98: night service (replaces Line 1 and N98 replaces Line 4); White backgrounds: limited service; Last two digits represent service area: 00s and 10s – Central; 20s – Gloucester; 30s – Orléans; 40s – Ottawa East; 50s – Ottawa West; 60s – Kanata, Stittsville; 70s – Barrhaven; 80s – Nepean; 90s – South Keys

Stop	Routes
A Northwest	63 110 165 166 660 664
B Southeast	63 110 165

== See also ==
- OC Transpo
- OC Transpo routes
- Transitway (Ottawa)
- Kanata, Ontario
