= Tunney's Pasture station =

Transit station in Ottawa, Canada

Tunney's Pasture
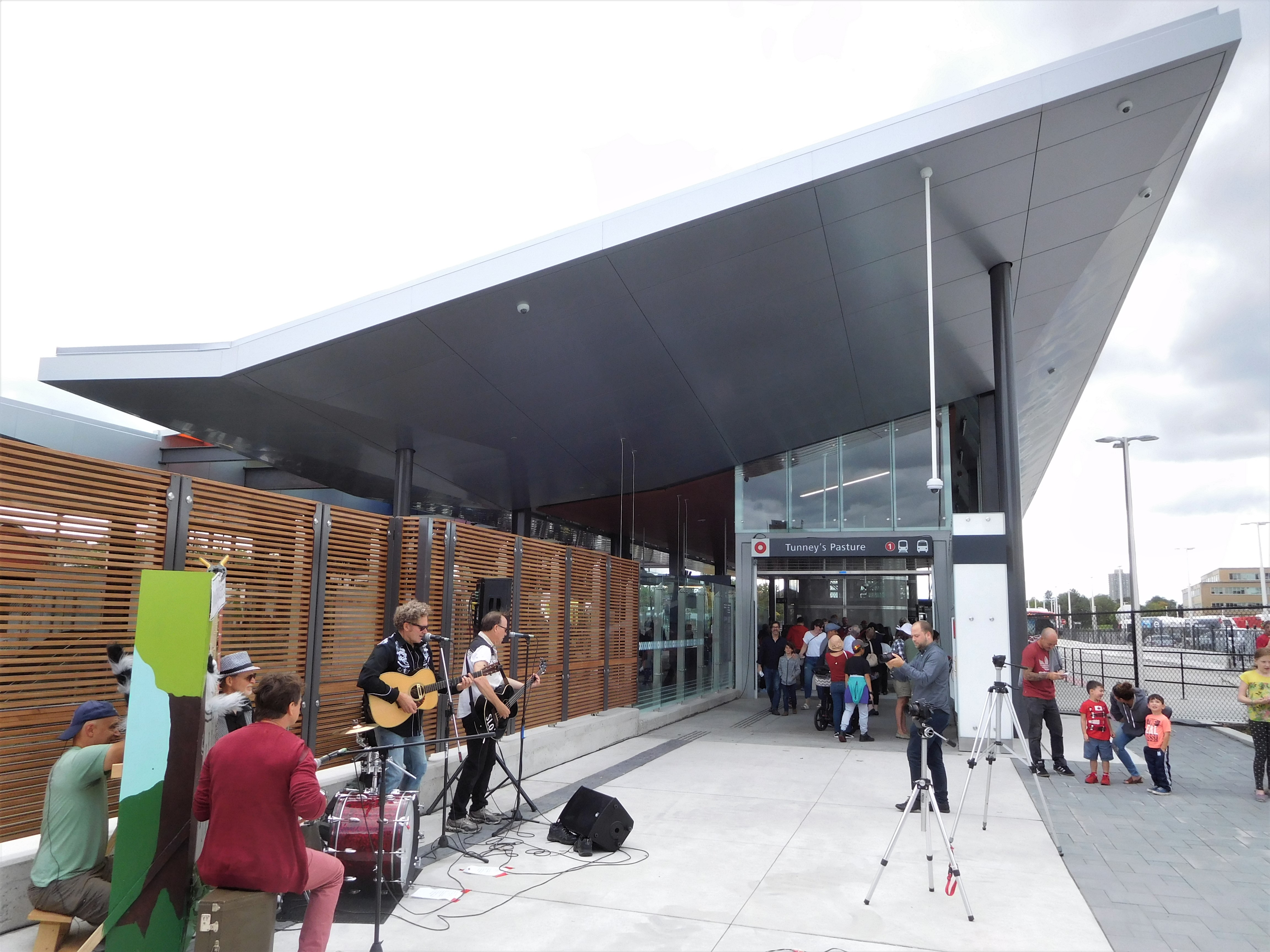
- Tunney's Pasture station

General information
- Coordinates: 45°24′14″N 75°44′06″W
- Owner: OC Transpo
- Platforms: 2 (train); 2 (bus)
- Tracks: 2

Construction
- Structure type: Trench (LRT station)
- Accessible: Yes

Other information
- Station code: 3011

History
- Opened: 1983 (Transitway); 2019 (O-Train)
- Rebuilt: 2015–2019

Services
Preceding station	OC Transpo	Following station
Terminus	Line 1	Bayview toward Blair
Westboro toward Carling Campus	Route 57	Terminus
Westboro toward Abbot POC	Route 58	Terminus
Westboro toward Stittsville	Route 61	Terminus
Westboro toward Stittsville	Route 62	Terminus
Westboro toward Innovation	Route 63	Terminus
Westboro toward Limebank	Route 74	Terminus
Westboro toward Cambrian	Route 75	Terminus

Future services
Preceding station	OC Transpo	Following station
Westboro toward Algonquin	Line 1 Opens 2027	Bayview toward Trim
Westboro toward Moodie	Line 3 Opens 2027	Bayview toward Trim
Location

Tunney's Pasture station is the western O-Train light rail terminal train station and a major bus transitway station in Ottawa, Ontario.

== Location ==
It is located at the Tunney's Pasture government office complex, on Scott Street at Holland Avenue.

== History ==
When originally opened in 1983, the transitway in the area consisted of a through station in a below-grade 'trench' parallel to Scott Street. Each platform had an elevator and stairway to the ground level above; the two sides were connected by an enclosed pedestrian bridge, and the ground-level station area also has platforms for local buses.

On 10 May 2003, an arson at the station inflicted damage estimated at $400,000 to $500,000 CAD. The fire left portions of the station out of service for months.

On June 24, 2016, the transitway station was closed for conversion to light rail, and reopened in 2019 as the western terminus of the first phase of the Confederation Line. There are provisions to permit the Confederation Line to extend further west along the transitway in the next stage.

== Layout ==
The station is a side platform station built below grade in a cutting. At street level, a broad concourse with two ticket barriers gives access to Scott Street and Tunney's Pasture Driveway. It also provides access within the fare-paid zone to the transitway terminal loop, allowing transfer between the bus and train without having to show a ticket or transfer.

As a terminus station, both platforms are used as arrival and departure platforms. Because of the station's side platform rather than island platform layout, displays on the concourse level are necessary to indicate which platform will next have a train departing.

The station features the artwork Gradient Space by Derek Root, a set of coloured mosaics lining the platform walls accompanied by a stained-glass skylight.

== Service ==
The following routes serve Tunney's Pasture station as of April 27, 2025:

Key
Line 1 (O-Train) Line 2 (O-Train) Line 4 (O-Train)	O-Train
E1	Shuttle Express
R1 R2 R4	O-Train replacement bus routes
N75	Night routes
40 12	Frequent routes
99 162	Local routes
275	Connexion routes
303	Shopper routes
405	Event routes
646	School routes
STO	Société de transport de l'Outaouais routes
Additional info: Line 1: Confederation Line; Line 2: Trillium Line; Line 4: Airport Link; Routes 5 to 199: Custom routing that that connects to Line 1 and/or 2; Routes 200 to 299: Connexion (peak-period only routes that connect to the O-Train); Routes 301 to 305: Shopper Routes (limited rural service); Routes 404 to 406: Canadian Tire Centre events; Routes 450 to 456: Lansdowne Park events; Routes 600 to 699: School Routes; Route R1: replaces Line 1 when it is out of service; Route R2: replaces Line 2 when it is out of service; Route R4: replaces Line 4 when it is out of service; Routes N39 to N98: night service (replaces Line 1 and N98 replaces Line 4); White backgrounds: limited service; Last two digits represent service area: 00s and 10s – Central; 20s – Gloucester; 30s – Orléans; 40s – Ottawa East; 50s – Ottawa West; 60s – Kanata, Stittsville; 70s – Barrhaven; 80s – Nepean; 90s – South Keys

Stop	Routes
West O-Train	Under construction (opening in 2027)
East O-Train	Line 1 (O-Train)
A Peak West	256 261 262 263 265 266
B Transitway West	57 58 60 61 62 63 66 67
C Rail Replacement	R1 N57 N61 N63 N75
D Local South/West	11 51 80 81 86 87
E Local East	11 12 13 14 53 56
F Transitway South	73 74 75 82
G Peak South	275 277 279
H Scott St. West	none
I Tunney's Pasture / Yarrow	STO

== Gallery ==
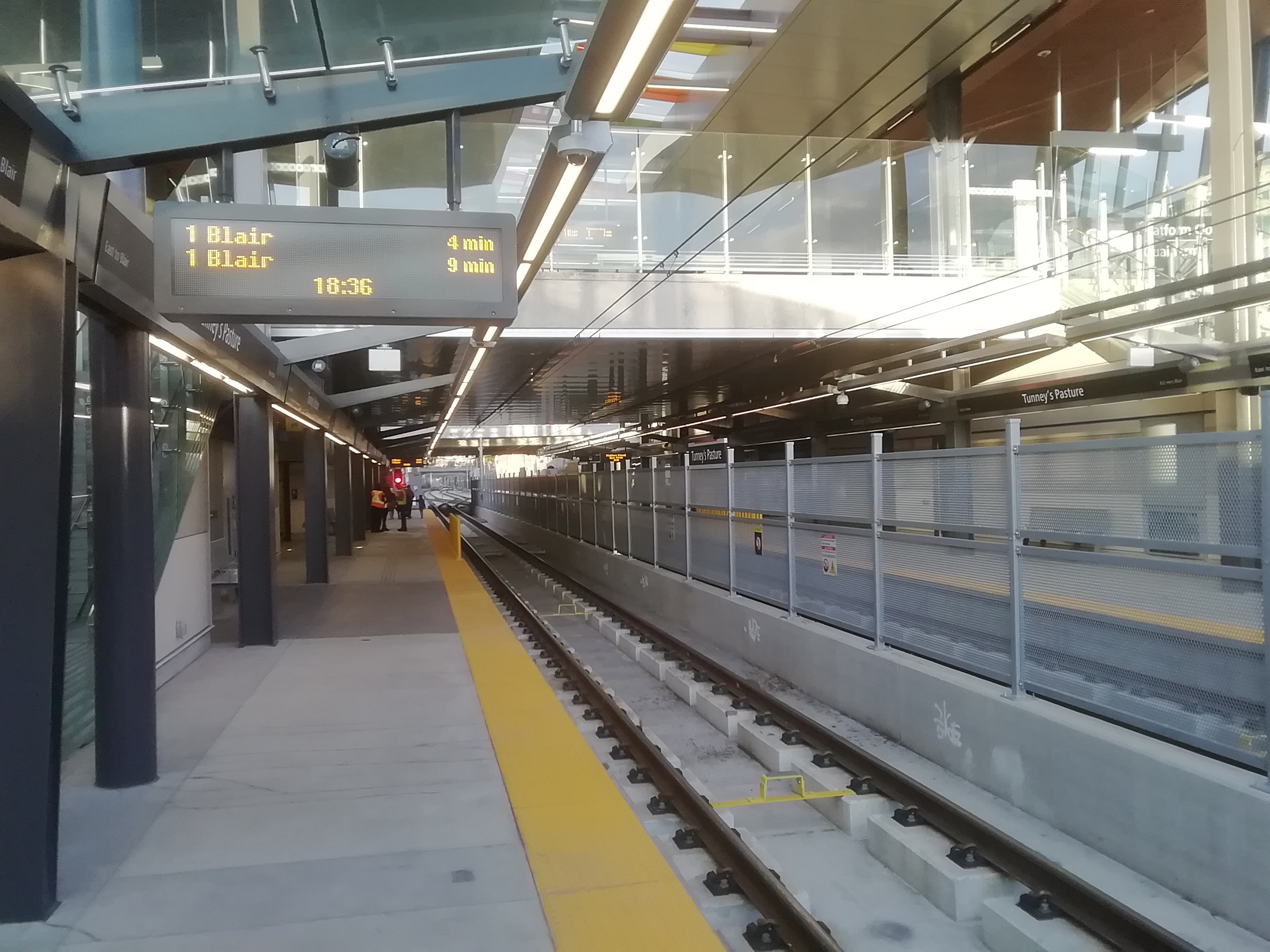
Track level platform

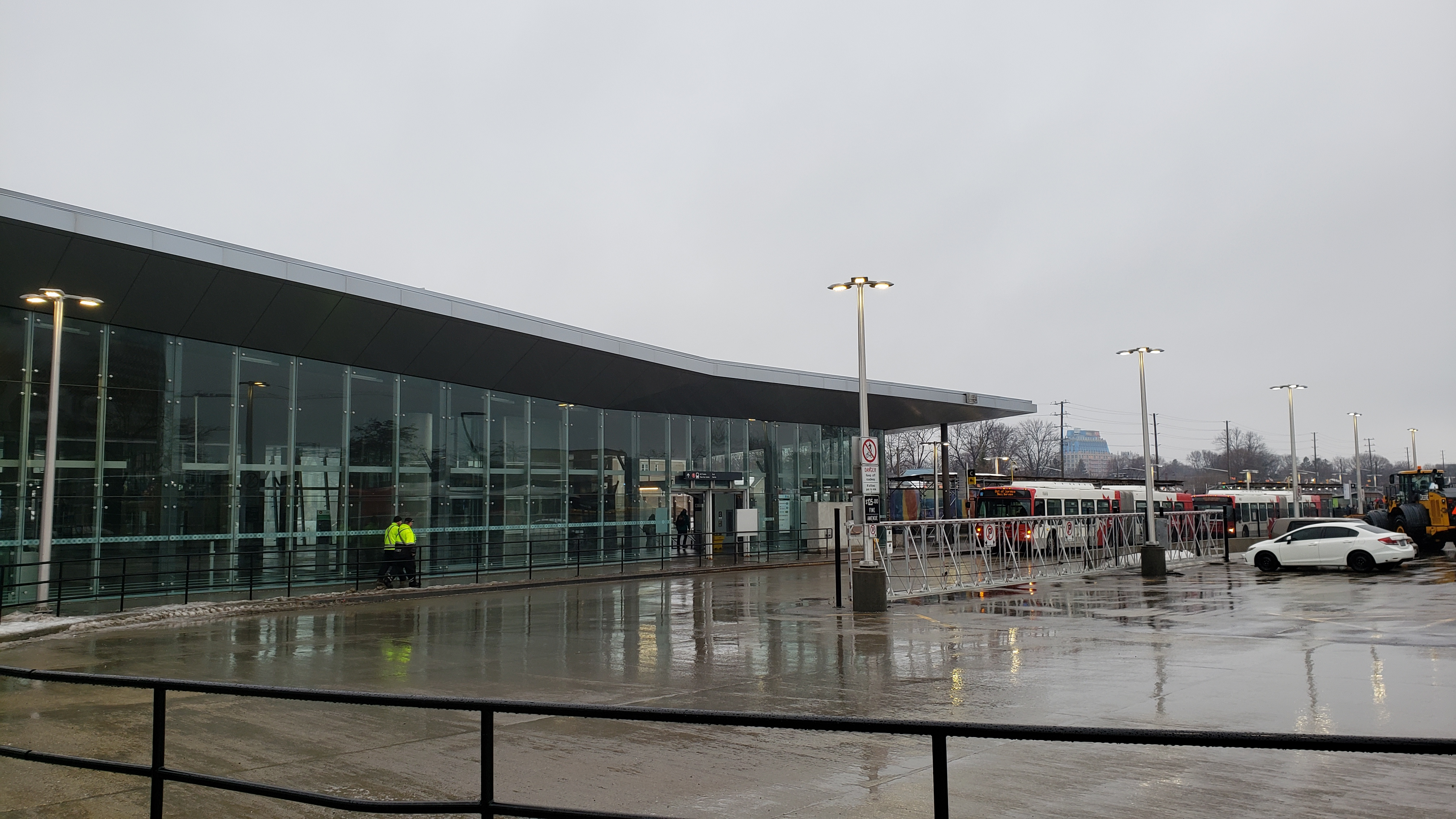
The bus loop at Tunney's Pasture station

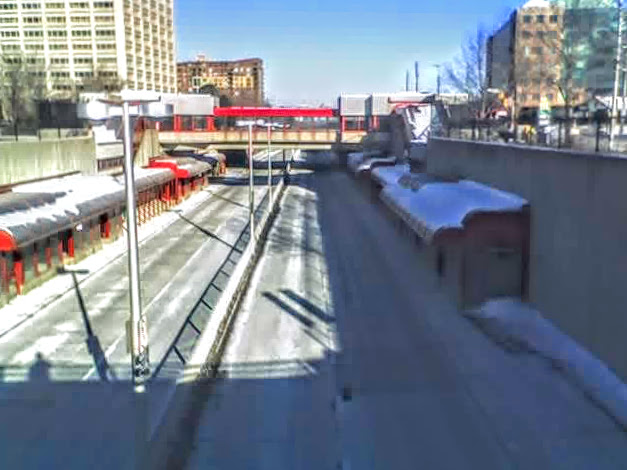
The former Transitway station in 2007, taken from above the Transitway

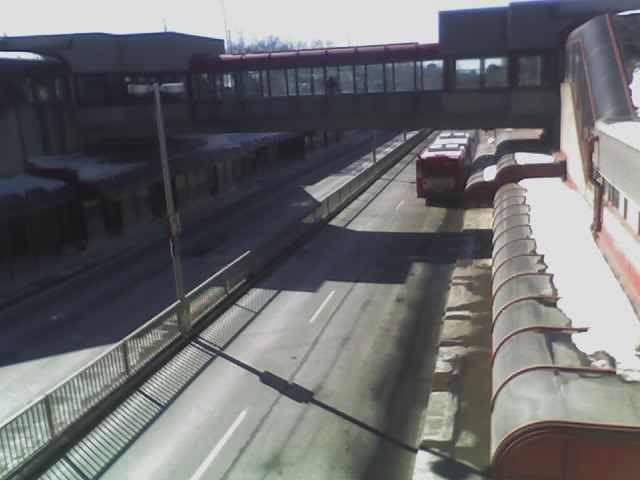
The former transitway station in 2007, facing eastbound
