= Stittsville station =

Stittsville

General information
- Location: Shea Road; Stittsville, Ontario; Canada
- Coordinates: 45°15′49″N 75°54′24″W
- Owner: OC Transpo

Services
Preceding station	OC Transpo	Following station
Terminus	Route 61	Terry Fox toward Tunney's Pasture
Terminus	Route 62	Terry Fox toward Tunney's Pasture
Location

Stittsville is a bus stop on Ottawa, Ontario's transitway served by OC Transpo buses. It located on Shea Road at the Goulbourn Recreation Complex in Stittsville, Ontario.

It is the western terminus of some route 61 trips. A park and ride facility is also located in Stittsville but it is not served by the 61 (only express route 262 runs by the facility near Carp Road and Highway 417). Service on route 61 to/from this station generally operates every 30 minutes during all time periods, except 15 minute peak service on route 61C (eastbound in the morning and westbound in the afternoon) and hourly frequencies on weekend evenings.

Service on route 61 and route 61C have been shortened to start/end at the Goulbourn Recreation Complex on Shea Road. Route 62 provides service on Granite Ridge Drive, previously served by route 61 and 61C.

As of June 28, 2015, route 96A trips were replaced by route 92 (now route 62). Route 62 operates on Campeau Drive between Kanata Avenue and Eagleson Road, replacing local route 164. At the same time, both route 61 and route 62 were shortened to start/end at St-Laurent station, as the eastern leg of the Transitway is being converted to LRT for the Confederation Line by 2018. Service on route 62 otherwise is the same as route 96A within Kanata and Stittsville. Route 62 only services Stittsville during weekday peak periods and weekday midday at 30 minute headway (as was the case with route 96A).

== Service ==
The following routes serve Stittsville station as of October 6, 2019:

Key
Line 1 (O-Train) Line 2 (O-Train) Line 4 (O-Train)	O-Train
E1	Shuttle Express
R1 R2 R4	O-Train replacement bus routes
N75	Night routes
40 12	Frequent routes
99 162	Local routes
275	Connexion routes
303	Shopper routes
405	Event routes
646	School routes
STO	Société de transport de l'Outaouais routes
Additional info: Line 1: Confederation Line; Line 2: Trillium Line; Line 4: Airport Link; Routes 5 to 199: Custom routing that that connects to Line 1 and/or 2; Routes 200 to 299: Connexion (peak-period only routes that connect to the O-Train); Routes 301 to 305: Shopper Routes (limited rural service); Routes 404 to 406: Canadian Tire Centre events; Routes 450 to 456: Lansdowne Park events; Routes 600 to 699: School Routes; Route R1: replaces Line 1 when it is out of service; Route R2: replaces Line 2 when it is out of service; Route R4: replaces Line 4 when it is out of service; Routes N39 to N98: night service (replaces Line 1 and N98 replaces Line 4); White backgrounds: limited service; Last two digits represent service area: 00s and 10s – Central; 20s – Gloucester; 30s – Orléans; 40s – Ottawa East; 50s – Ottawa West; 60s – Kanata, Stittsville; 70s – Barrhaven; 80s – Nepean; 90s – South Keys

Stop	Routes
#1795 Shea Rd. South	61
#2060 Shea Rd. North	62

== See also ==
- Kanata, Ontario
