= Old Ottawa East =

- Neighbourhood
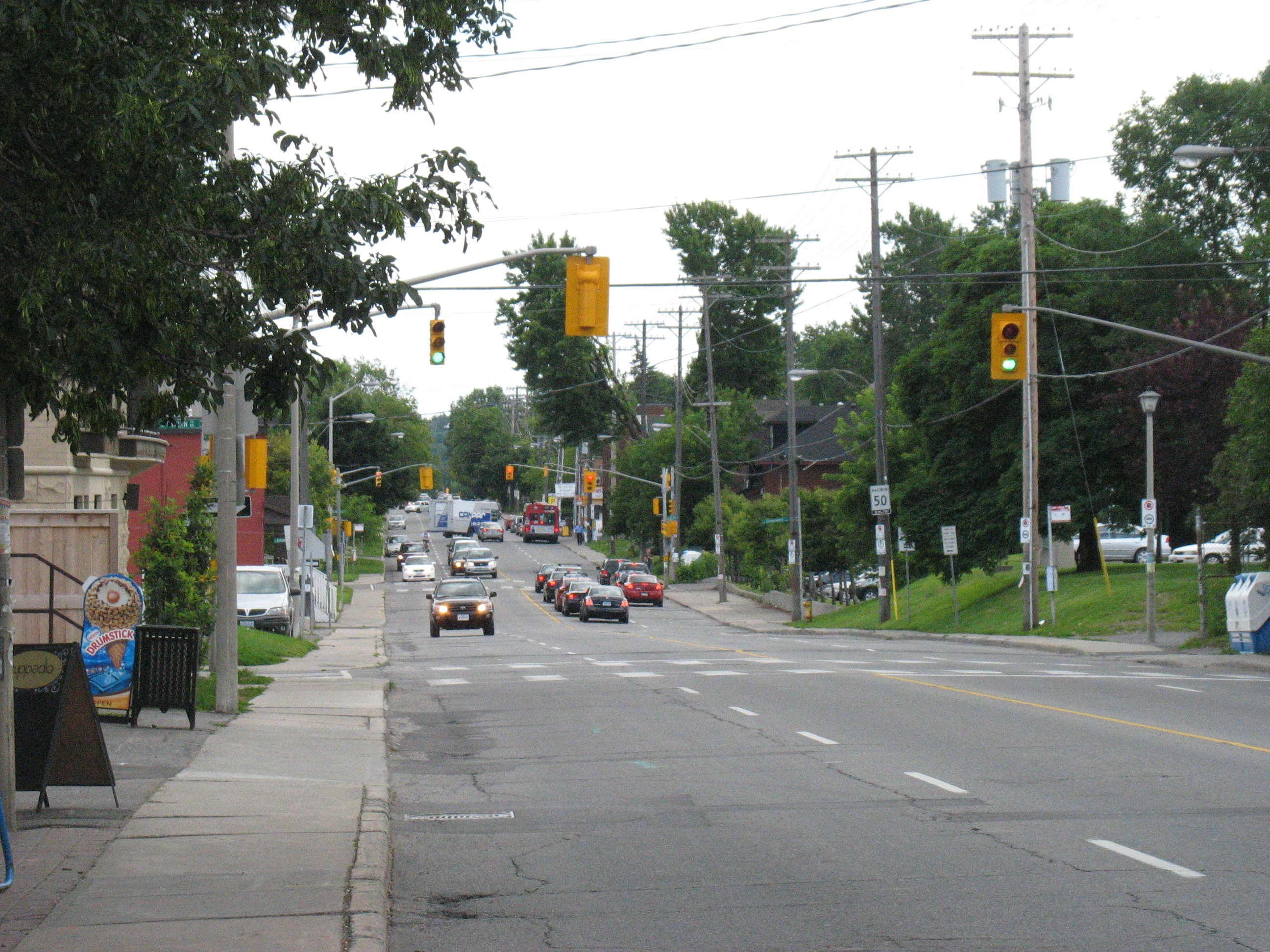
- Main Street

- Location in Ottawa
- Coordinates: 45°24′45″N 75°40′35″W
- Country: Canada
- Province: Ontario
- City: Ottawa
- Established: Archville
- Incorporated: 1888 (Village of Ottawa East)
- Annexation: 1907 (City of Ottawa)

Government
  - Mayor: Mark Sutcliffe
  - MP: Yasir Naqvi
  - MPP: Catherine McKenney
  - Councillor: Shawn Menard
- Elevation: 70 m (230 ft)

Population (2011)
  - Total: 7,279
- Canada 2011 Census
- Time zone: UTC-5 (Eastern (EST))
  - Summer (DST): UTC-4 (EDT)
- Forward sortation area: K1S

Old Ottawa East or just Ottawa East (Vieil Ottawa Est in French) is a neighbourhood in Capital Ward in central Ottawa, Ontario, Canada. It is located south of Nicholas Street and between the Rideau Canal and the Rideau River, with Avenue Road marking the southern border. To the south is the neighbourhood of Old Ottawa South and to the northeast is Sandy Hill. Old Ottawa East includes the Lees Avenue area. The Flora Footbridge, which opened to pedestrians in 2019, connects the community to The Glebe.

According to the Canada 2011 Census, the population of the neighbourhood was 7,279.

This small neighbourhood was originally the suburban community of Archville that was incorporated as the village of Ottawa East in 1888. In 1907 it was amalgamated with the growing community of Ottawa. Running through the centre of the neighbourhood is Main Street, which was the central road of Archville, but which is not particularly central to modern Ottawa. The neighbourhood is home to Saint Paul University, Lady Evelyn Alternative School, Au Coeur d'Ottawa elementary school, the central campus of St. Nicholas Adult High School, and Immaculata High School.

The centre of the neighbourhood is home to Greystone Village, a housing development that has been met with some objection by neighbourhood residents. The southern part of the neighbourhood is sometimes referred to as Rideau Gardens.

The Cuban embassy is located in the neighbourhood, along Main Street.

== History ==
The area now known as Old Ottawa East developed on the northeastern edge of historic Nepean Township. Organized settlement in Nepean began in the 1790s following the creation of Upper Canada, but the future Ottawa East remained only lightly settled for decades. Much of the surrounding land was tied up in Crown, clergy, and Loyalist grants, while absentee ownership and speculation slowed permanent settlement and agricultural improvement. By 1822, Nepean’s population remained very small, and settlement in its northeastern section was sparse.

A decisive turning point came in 1826 with the construction of the Rideau Canal under Lieutenant-Colonel John By. The canal reshaped the district's geography and brought a dramatic population increase to the northeast of Nepean, especially through the influx of labourers and associated settlement around Bytown. The project also permanently fixed the Canal as the western edge of Old Ottawa East. The Canal’s final route was itself shaped by speculative landholding, and the lands alongside the waterway remained difficult to regulate. Lieutenant-Colonel By attempted to settle canal workers on rented Ordnance lands, but after his recall, the system deteriorated into a patchwork of rented parcels, squatting, boundary disputes, and irregular occupation that persisted into the later 19th century.

The future Ottawa East area began to emerge more clearly in the 1840s and 1850s. The land between the Rideau Canal and Rideau River, then part of Nepean’s Merivale District, was known as the “back bush”. Much of it remained in the hands of absentee speculators until financial pressures forced sales in the late 1840s, opening the area to agricultural and later residential development. When Bytown became the City of Ottawa in 1855, the new city’s southern boundary stopped at Ann Street, later Gladstone and Mann avenues, leaving the future Ottawa East outside the city and politically suburban even as its economy became increasingly tied to Ottawa proper.

Several landowners played major roles in the district’s development. William Stewart acquired extensive holdings immediately south of the future city and successfully lobbied to have his property excluded from Ottawa’s 1855 boundaries. After his death, his land in the area passed to his son Archibald Stewart, who in 1873 registered the subdivision known as Archville West. This was one of the earliest formal suburban plans in the area and marked an important step in the transition from rural holdings to village development. The subdivision included streets later known as Greenfield, Montcalm, Havelock, Harvey, Concord, and Echo Drive.

Development was also shaped by changes in transportation. Before the canal, north–south travel followed older forced roads shaped by the terrain. After the canal severed these routes, a new road was cut from the Billings Bridge area to the canal road and Lower Town, improving access between Gloucester and Ottawa and helping establish the future Main Street–Echo Drive corridor as a key route for settlement and trade. In the 1870s, local landowners including, Robert Lees and Archibald Stewart, also supported the construction of Hurdman’s Bridge and its approach road, strengthening links to Gloucester and the agricultural land east of the Rideau River.

Religious institutions also left a lasting mark on the neighbourhood’s landscape. In 1863, land east of Main Street was sold to the Roman Catholic College of St. Joseph, later associated with St. Joseph’s Scholasticate of the Oblate Order and, eventually, Saint Paul University.

By the 1860s and 1870s, Ottawa East had become a mixed rural, industrial, and residential fringe. Large farms and market gardens dominated the centre and south, while the northern part of the district combined small residential clusters with brickyards, slaughterhouses, and other trades. Bruce Elliott characterizes Ottawa’s suburbs in this period as places that concentrated the disadvantaged and undesirable uses pushed to the edge of the city, and Ottawa East fits that broader pattern. By the end of the 1870s, the area was predominantly working-class and blue-collar, even as farming remained important in its southern reaches.

Among the most important local figures was Robert Lees, a lawyer, farmer, speculator, and political leader who acquired extensive holdings in the district beginning in 1859. His influence over land development and local politics helped shape the future village and played a major role in the fight against annexation in the late 1880s.

In the late 1880s, annexation became the central political question. Like other suburban districts beyond Ottawa’s municipal limits, Ottawa East was governed through Nepean Township, whose rural structure and limited legal powers made it difficult to provide urban services such as fire protection, policing, public health regulation, and sanitary infrastructure. Ottawa sought to annex surrounding suburbs, but local leaders argued that incorporation as a separate village would better protect local interests and secure services without surrendering control to the city. The County Council approved incorporation on 7 December 1888, creating the Village of Ottawa East, only weeks before annexation was otherwise expected to be imposed.

As a separate municipality, Ottawa East controlled its own local development for nearly two decades. During this period, the village expanded its civic works and consolidated its built form as a small but distinct urban community on the edge of Ottawa. However, pressures for metropolitan expansion did not disappear. In the early 20th century, Ottawa renewed its campaign to create a larger unified city, and Ottawa East was eventually annexed in 1907, bringing an end to its period of village self-government.

== Reeves ==
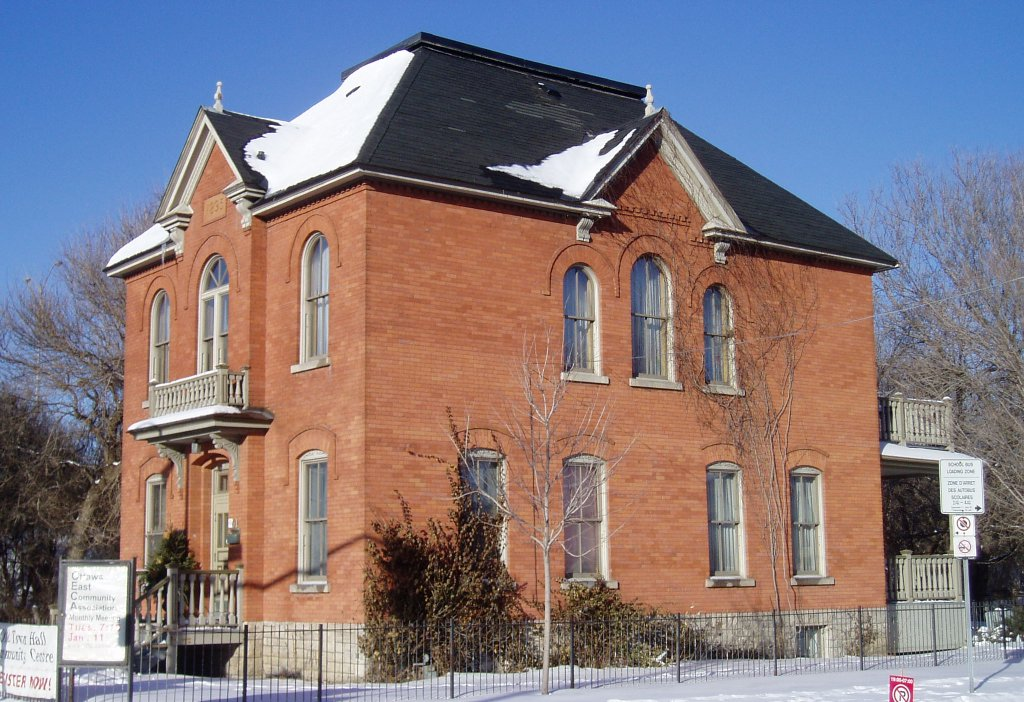
Former Ottawa East Town Hall

As an independent village, Ottawa East elected a reeve (similar to a mayor) to head a village council from 1888 to 1907. The reeves of the village were as follows:

- James Ballantyne (1888–1894)
- James S. Webster (?-1898)
- Henry George Roche (1899–1902)
- Ronald M. Saunders (1903–1905)
- Robert J. Biggars (1906–1907)

== Notable residents ==
- Jean Chrétien, former prime minister
- Paul Dewar, politician
- Wallis Giunta, opera singer
- Leonard Grosvenor, hockey player
- Patsy Guzzo, hockey player and olympian
- Don Loney, football player and coach
- Arnie Morrison, football player
- W.E. Noffke, architect
- Ralph St. Germain, hockey player and olympian
- Rick Vaive, hockey player

== See also ==
- List of Ottawa neighbourhoods
