= Champlain Park =

- Neighbourhood
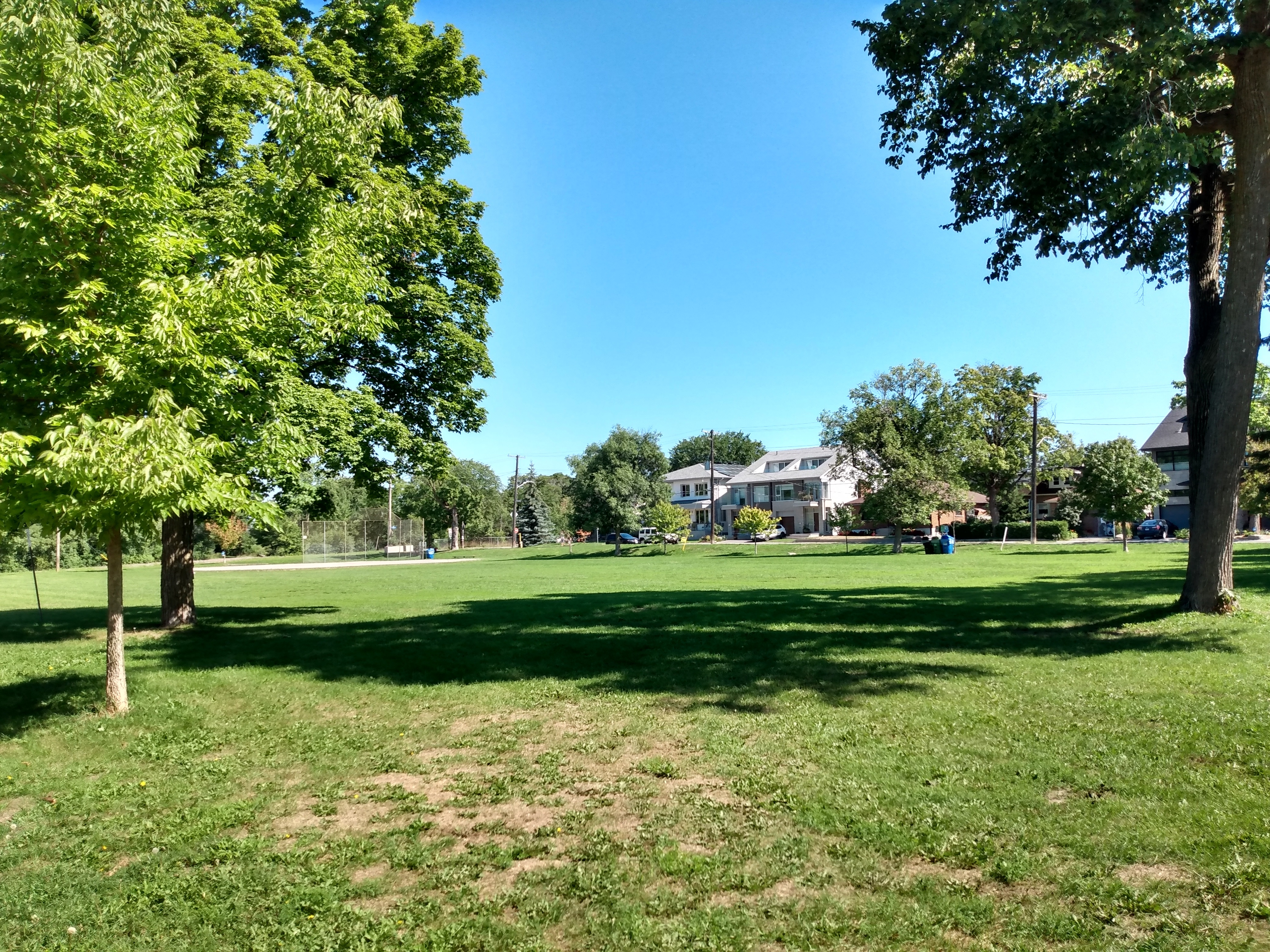
- Champlain Park

- Location within Ottawa
- Coordinates: 45.40268°N 75.74565°W
- Country: Canada
- Province: Ontario
- City: Ottawa

Government
  - MPs: Yasir Naqvi
  - MPPs: Catherine McKenney
  - Councillors: Jeff Leiper
  - Governing body: Champlain Park Community Association
  - Meeting chair: Nick Xenos

Area
  - Total: 1.047 km^{2} (0.404 sq mi)
- Elevation: 60 m (200 ft)

Population (Canada 2016 Census)
  - Total: 1,090
  - Density: 1,040/km^{2} (2,700/sq mi)
- Time zone: Eastern (EST)
- Website: Community Association

Champlain Park (French: Parc Champlain; also known as Ottawa West) is an urban neighbourhood in the Kitchissippi Ward in Ottawa, Ontario, Canada. In the 1930s, it was considered the west end of town. The boundaries of the neighbourhood are the Ottawa River to the north, and Scott Street to the south; to the east is Tunney's Pasture, and to the west is Island Park Drive, as well as Westboro Beach. As of the 2016 Canadian census, its population was 1090.

The area was part of the police village of Ottawa West from 1912 until being annexed by Ottawa in 1949. The police village was bounded by Ottawa's city limits, the Ottawa River and the Britannia street car line. Most of the homes were built in the 1920s and 1930s, with the last development in the 1950s. The community association was incorporated in 1991.

Notable buildings include St. George Elementary School, the Ottawa mosque where the Ottawa Muslim Association has their meetings, and the adjacent Hall of Peace, formerly the Northwestern United Church.

== Recreation ==
- Champlain Park
- NCC (National Capital Commission) bike path.
