= South Keys =

Neighbourhood in Ottawa, Ontario, Canada

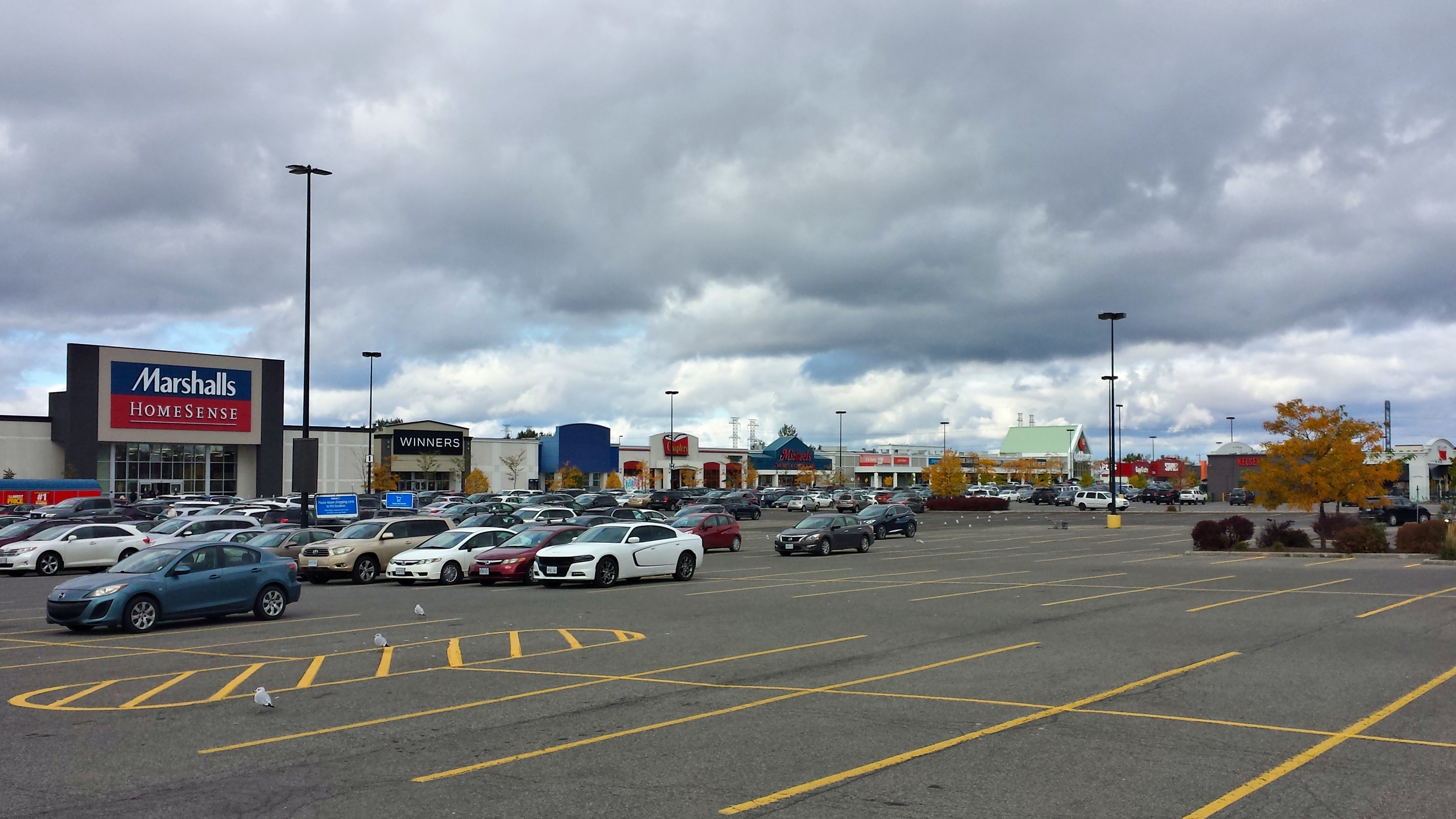
South Keys shopping centre

South Keys is a neighbourhood in Gloucester-Southgate Ward in the south end of Ottawa, Ontario, Canada. It is bounded by Johnston Road to the north, Albion Road to the east, the Airport Parkway to the west, and Hunt Club Road to the south. According to the Canada 2011 Census, the neighbourhood has a population of 2,849. The neighbourhood is part of the South Keys Greenboro Community Association.

South Keys was the first subdivision in Ottawa to be built south of the CNR railroad in the 1960s.

== Businesses ==
The main business area of the neighbourhood is the South Keys Shopping Centre, first opened in 1996, which comprises 32 national chains and local stores as of July, 2018. Anchor stores include Loblaws, Walmart, and Cineplex. South Keys also includes a CIBC branch and an RBC branch.

== Demographics ==
The South Keys Shopping Centre owner notes that there are 3,270 households comprising 8,513 people within a one-kilometre radius of the shopping centre. The average household income within this radius is $77,418. Expanding the radius to five kilometres captures 130,934 people living in 50,084 households with an average income of $85,092.

A June 2012 report by Ottawa Magazine called it one of the 20 best neighbourhoods in Ottawa for first-time home buyers.

== Transportation ==
Several main roads run from the South Keys neighbourhood directly downtown, such as Bank Street and the Airport Parkway (which becomes Bronson Avenue). The OC Transpo Transitway includes train and bus stops at South Keys and Greenboro Stations.

== Crime ==
The area has garnered a reputation for crime over time. The Ottawa Police Crime Mapping Tool shows a number of usually minor crimes in the South Keys area, including theft, vehicle theft, and break and enter.

A June 2012 report by Ottawa Magazine noted the relatively high crime rate in the South Keys area: 125.1 property crimes per 1,000 in 2006.

Around 4:30am on December 18, 2011, someone shot at the front window of the Walmart. No one was injured and the police investigation did not lead to any arrests.

On February 15, 2012 police responded to gunshots on Southgate Road. The shots fired went through a neighbour's window, resulting in tactical officers responding to the scene from where the shots were heard. Upon entry a body was found.

On July 28, 2013 around 9:00am the body of a deceased female was found in the ditch between the Kelsey's parking lot and Bank Street. The following day she was confirmed as Melissa Richmond, who had been missing for the previous two weeks. It was Ottawa's seventh homicide of the year. On August 2, 2013 her husband, Howard Richmond, was charged with first degree murder.

On Monday, November 25, 2013 around 6:30pm, an elderly woman disembarking a bus at South Keys Station was grabbed and had her personal belongings stolen. The police say it was just one of several robberies in the South Keys neighbourhood: a total of 11 robberies have taken place in the area since October 2013, and usually involve a man or group of men demanding property and threatening the use of a gun or weapon.

South Keys and other neighbourhoods in the surrounding areas of the south of the city have been plagued by shootings in recent years as well, registering the majority of the cities shootings and homicides in several years. It brought attention to communities leaders to take action and find solutions with included police presence. Although generally safe area, the communities in and around South Keys area continue to see shootings, homicides and other sorts of crime.
