= Société de transport de l'Outaouais =

Transport agency in the Outaouais region of Quebec

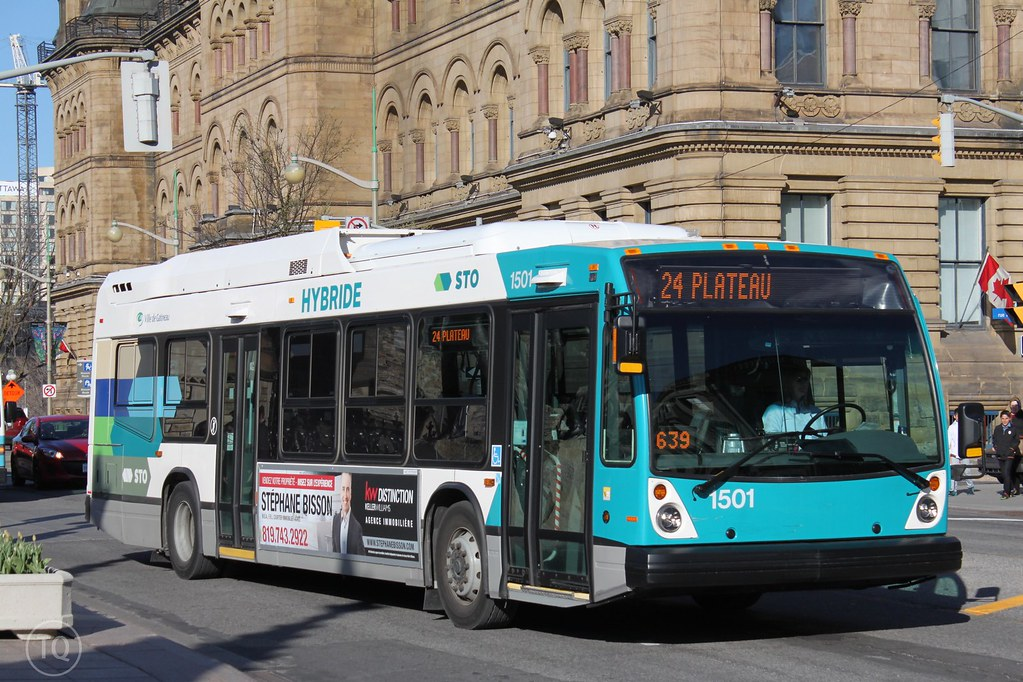
- A STO Novabus LFS HEV on Wellington Street in Ottawa
- Founded: 1971
- Headquarters: 111, rue Jean-Proulx; Gatineau, Quebec; J8Z 1T4
- Locale: Outaouais
- Service area: Gatineau and Downtown Ottawa
- Service type: Bus service, paratransit
- Routes: 66
- Stations: 11
- Fleet: 345 buses
- Annual ridership: 19.4 million (2010)
- Fuel type: Diesel, hybrid
- Chief executive: Patrick Leclerc
- Chairperson: Jocelyn Blondin
- Website: sto.ca

Société de transport de l'Outaouais ([sɔsjete də tʁɑ̃spɔʁ də lutawɛ], STO, "Outaouais Transport Company") is the transit service of the Outaouais region of Quebec. It operates conventional services and the Rapibus, a bus rapid transit service, in Gatineau, Quebec, including the districts of Hull, Aylmer, Gatineau, Buckingham and Masson-Angers. STO provided limited service to Chelsea and Cantley until June 2015 when Transcollines began operations in the Collines de l'Outaouais MRC. STO is located on the Quebec-side of Canada's National Capital Region, and operates several bus routes through Downtown Ottawa, Ontario.

== History ==
Prior to 1971, public transportation in Gatineau was operated by private sector companies, including Hull Electric Company and later Compagnie Transport urbain de Hull. In 1971, these companies had a total of 42 buses and 2.5 million clients. This same year, the Commission de transport de la communauté régionale de l'Outaouais (CTCRO) was created to improve regional transportation services that would otherwise exceed the means of the constituent cities.

In 1972, for $6.25 million, CTCRO purchased 8 private transit companies in the region: Transport urbain de Hull, Transport Hull métropolitain, Transport d'écoliers du nord de l'Outaouais. A year later, the CTCRO created an agreement with OC Transpo to make transfers between the two services easier.

It purchased only air-conditioned buses from its first one, 1990. In 1991, it changed its name to Société de transport de l'Outaouais (STO)

In 1998, the STO was named the "Canadian public transit operator of the year" by the Canadian Urban Transit Association (CUTA). From 1999 to 2001, to satisfy growing demand, the STO purchased additional second-hand buses from the Société de transport de Montréal, Société de transport de Laval, Société de transport de Sherbrooke and OC Transpo. They all have since been retired.

The STO introduced its first fleet of low-floor buses from NovaBus in 2002, and it has only such buses since then. The following year, the STO announced plans to build a bus-only roadway called the Rapibus. The project was initially expected to be completed by 2009, but it was finally opened in 2013.

In 2005, the STO announced a strategic plan for 2002–2015 in which it projected a ridership of 96 million by 2019 up from 2.4 million in 1992. Ridership from 1995 to 2006 had grown about 50%. In addition to the Rapibus, the STO planned to increase the number of park and ride facilities across the city as well as introduce bike racks, expand or add garages, and expand the fleet.

In 2012, it introduced its fleet of Novabus LFS articulated buses and the following year, it unveiled their new visual identity – L'avenir en commun (in English: the future together) as well as a new logo.

In 2013, STO launched a new bus rapid transit (BRT) system called Rapibus, which includes a dedicated 12-kilometre corridor that runs from Labrosse Boulevard to Alexandre-Taché Boulevard.

In 2015, the STO bought 10 Classics from Calgary Transit, the last buses to be purchased second-hand from another company.

In February 2020, the last Classic bus (#9225 an ex-Calgary Transit unit) retired, marking an end to the iconic bus model of the STO which span for more than four decades.

In June 2021, STO buses in downtown Ottawa were re-routed from Wellington Street and Rideau Street to Albert Street and Slater Street, using the bus lanes that had previously formed the downtown section of the Transitway until they were made obsolete by the opening of the Confederation Line.

In 2024, the STO began testing 100% electric buses in order to complete its future vision of fully electrifying its fleet of modern vehicles by 2042.

== Operations ==
According to its 2014 annual report, STO employed a total of 780 employees, of which 479 were drivers. It also has a total of 345 buses, 70 routes and 284 shelters. Its ridership in 2014 was approx. 19.8 million, a slight decrease from previous years. Similarly to other cities, it also has paratransit service (about 60 vehicles of various sizes) and park and ride service (23 locations as of 2014).

Fares are paid with the Multi Card (French: Carte Multi, stylised as MULTI). Multi is the city's second fare card; the first was originally introduced in 1998, and was replaced by Multi in 2012.

== Fleet ==
Since 2002, Novabus LFS's have been purchased annually to replace older vehicles and to expand the fleet over time. All generations have been purchased except the first generation as OC Transpo (its sister company) have found its first generation Novabus LFS's to be unreliable.

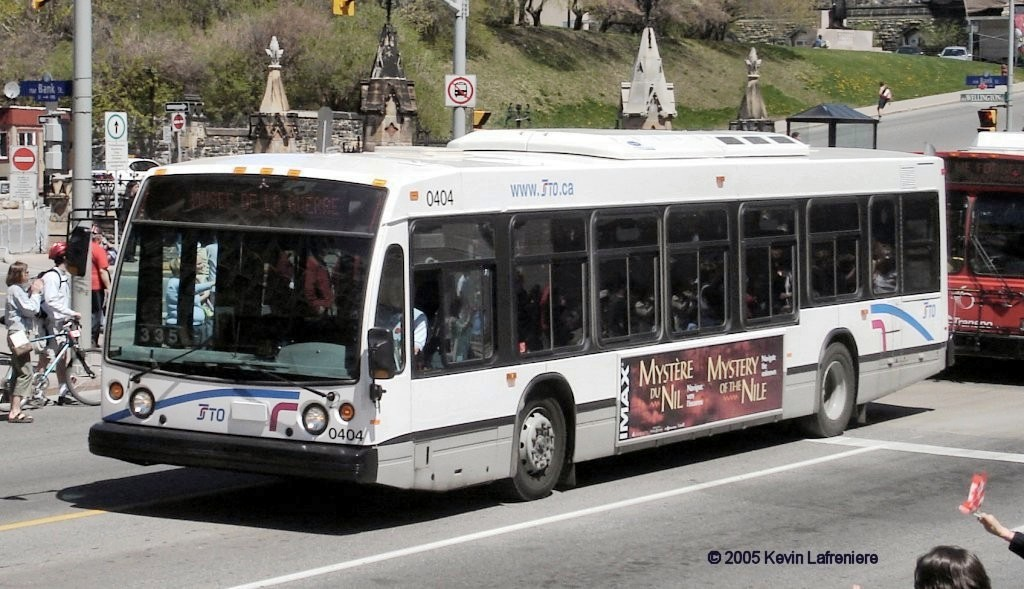
A NovaBus low-floor bus

=== Accessibility ===
The STO planned to convert half of its total bus fleet into low-floor, LFS model NovaBus by 2012. Unfortunately, the more recent models had a decreased seating capacity (room for 37 rather than 40). Another issue that was discovered with this model were the unreliable telescopic ramps that prevented wheelchair access to the bus. As of 1988, the fleet had wheelchair accessible buses. These were of the 1995 first-generation LFS's, which have the more reusable flick-out rooms. Aside from these plans, wheelchair users rely on the paratransit service.

=== Technology ===
A number of significant technology improvements and studies have been made over the past few decades by the STO. In 1998, the company introduced a smart-card fare system, making it the first company not only in the Americas but the entire Western Hemisphere to have a smart-card system. Paper card bus passes were gradually phased out until its official end in 2004 when smart cards became the exclusive bus pass.

In 2006–07, fishbowl buses had their rollsigns replaced with LED signs. In 2002 and again in 2007, the STO tested new hybrid buses for feasibility. During the summer of 2008, the STO has started a test trial of a prototype New Flyer articulated bus on several of its routes. The bus has 58 seats and a total capacity of 115 passengers.

In 2014, the STO added Wi-Fi to several of its lines, including all buses and stations associated with Rapibus. In 2015, the STO announced plans to introduce a trip planning app called Plani-Bus.

== Future ==
The STO is studying whether Gatineau's future transit needs will best be met by mixed rapid transit (bus rapid transit and tram) or tram only. A terminus near Lyon station has been suggested to facilitate transportation downtown without overwhelming the busy Bayview station.

== See also ==
- Public transport in Canada
