= Beatrice station =

Bus station in Ottawa, Canada

Beatrice
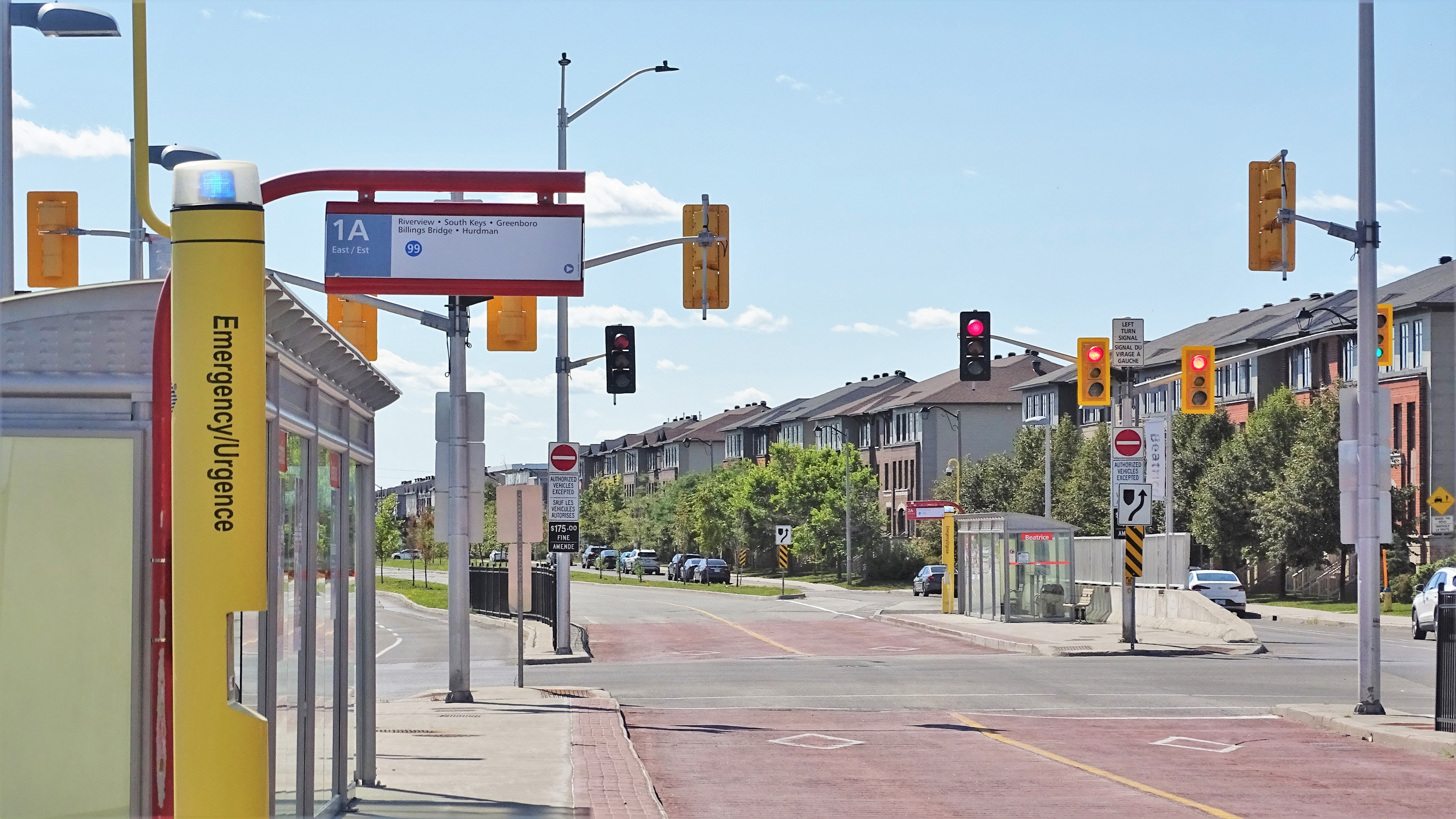

General information
- Location: Chapman Mills Drive at Beatrice Drive, Barrhaven, Ottawa, Ontario; Canada
- Coordinates: 45°16′18″N 75°43′33″W
- Owner: OC Transpo

History
- Opened: November 12, 2014

Services
Preceding station	OC Transpo	Following station
Marketplace toward Barrhaven Centre	Route 99	Nepean Woods toward Limebank
Marketplace toward Innovation	Route 110	Nepean Woods toward Limebank
Location

Beatrice station is a south-west Transitway station located in the Ottawa, Ontario, Canada, suburb of Barrhaven.

It is served by OC Transpo buses and opened on November 12, 2014. Beatrice Station straddles the corner of Chapman Mills Drive and Beatrice Drive in the heart of Barrhaven's shopping core and is served by a notable rapid-transit route, route 99. Two bus stops are located on Beatrice Drive directly to the north of the intersection, serving the rapid route 80, and Connexion route 277 on weekdays during peak times.

Connexion route 406 is extended from/to Riverview Station via Nepean Woods Station and the Vimy Memorial Bridge to provide residents with improved connections to events at the Canadian Tire Centre in Kanata.

== Service ==
The following routes serve Beatrice station as of April 27, 2025:

Key
Line 1 (O-Train) Line 2 (O-Train) Line 4 (O-Train)	O-Train
E1	Shuttle Express
R1 R2 R4	O-Train replacement bus routes
N75	Night routes
40 12	Frequent routes
99 162	Local routes
275	Connexion routes
303	Shopper routes
405	Event routes
646	School routes
STO	Société de transport de l'Outaouais routes
Additional info: Line 1: Confederation Line; Line 2: Trillium Line; Line 4: Airport Link; Routes 5 to 199: Custom routing that that connects to Line 1 and/or 2; Routes 200 to 299: Connexion (peak-period only routes that connect to the O-Train); Routes 301 to 305: Shopper Routes (limited rural service); Routes 404 to 406: Canadian Tire Centre events; Routes 450 to 456: Lansdowne Park events; Routes 600 to 699: School Routes; Route R1: replaces Line 1 when it is out of service; Route R2: replaces Line 2 when it is out of service; Route R4: replaces Line 4 when it is out of service; Routes N39 to N98: night service (replaces Line 1 and N98 replaces Line 4); White backgrounds: limited service; Last two digits represent service area: 00s and 10s – Central; 20s – Gloucester; 30s – Orléans; 40s – Ottawa East; 50s – Ottawa West; 60s – Kanata, Stittsville; 70s – Barrhaven; 80s – Nepean; 90s – South Keys

Stop	Routes
1A Transitway East	99 110
2A Transitway West	99 110 406 675
#0676 Beatrice Dr. North	277 675
#1579 Beatrice Dr. South	277

- Route 675 serves both stop 2A and the north bus stop on Beatrice Drive.
