= Marketplace station =

Transit station in Ottawa, Ontario, Canada

Marketplace
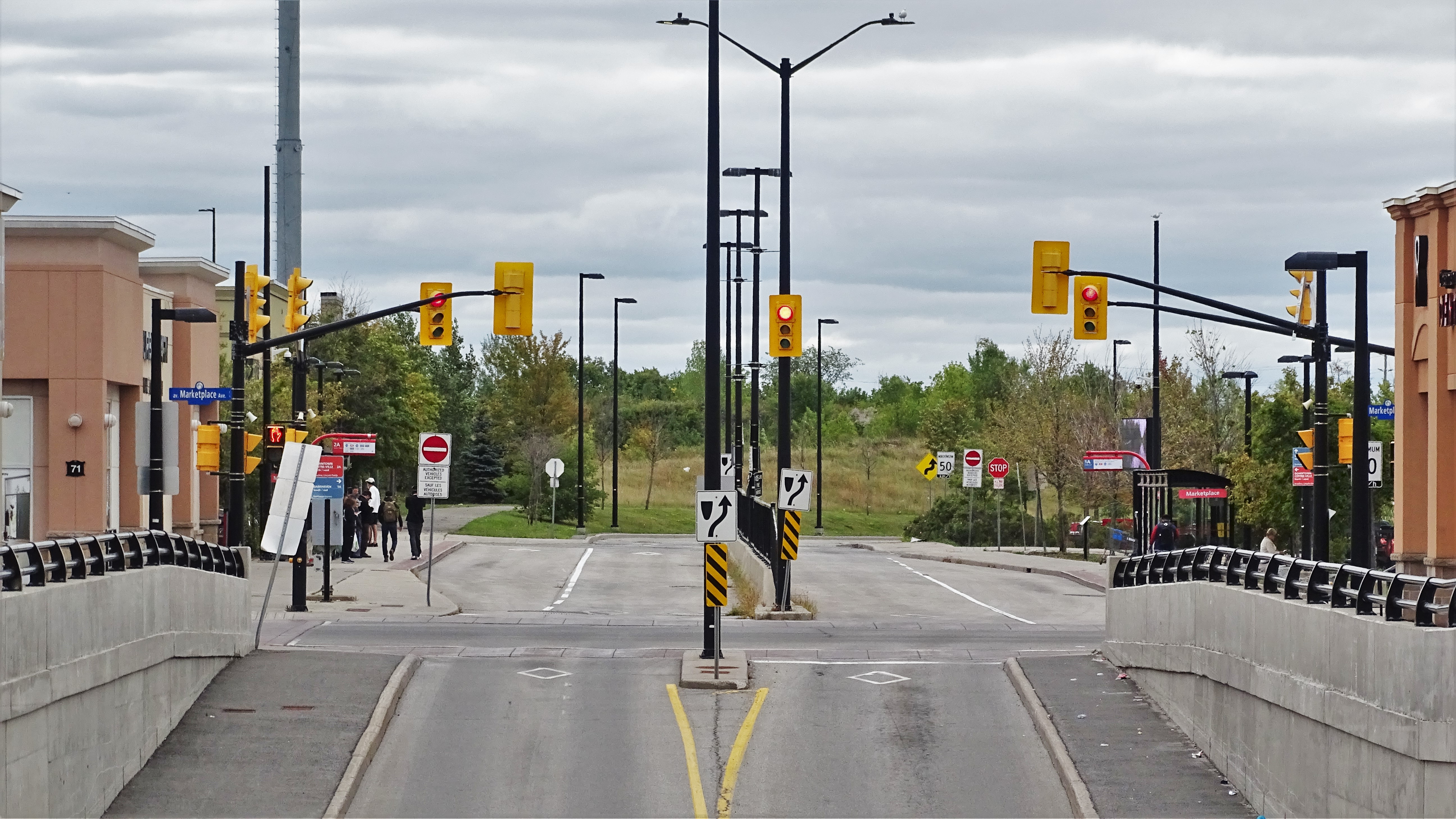

General information
- Location: Marketplace Ave, Barrhaven; Ottawa, Ontario; Canada
- Coordinates: 45°16′11″N 75°44′34″W
- Owner: OC Transpo

History
- Opened: April 17, 2011

Services
Preceding station	OC Transpo	Following station
Barrhaven Centre toward Cambrian	Route 75	Strandherd toward Tunney's Pasture
Barrhaven Centre Terminus	Route 99	Beatrice toward Limebank
Barrhaven Centre toward Innovation	Route 110	Beatrice toward Limebank
Location

Marketplace is a Southwest Transitway station in the Barrhaven neighbourhood of Ottawa, Ontario, Canada. The station is located at the Chapman Mills Marketplace shopping centre, an extensive commercial zone which contains big-box stores and department stores.

A temporary bus terminal served the neighbourhood initially. This street facility was replaced on April 17, 2011, by the permanent Transitway station and a new southerly terminus at Barrhaven Centre station which became the main connection point for local bus routes.

Starting July 19, 2014, route 99 has selected trips extended to/from Barrhaven Centre Station via Nepean Woods station, Beatrice station, and the Vimy Memorial Bridge, providing a connection to Riverside South and Greenboro station. This extension was later applied to all trips of route 99, and starting September 5, 2021, select routes were extended even further to CitiGate.

== Service ==
The following routes serve Marketplace station as of April 27, 2025:

Key
Line 1 (O-Train) Line 2 (O-Train) Line 4 (O-Train)	O-Train
E1	Shuttle Express
R1 R2 R4	O-Train replacement bus routes
N75	Night routes
40 12	Frequent routes
99 162	Local routes
275	Connexion routes
303	Shopper routes
405	Event routes
646	School routes
STO	Société de transport de l'Outaouais routes
Additional info: Line 1: Confederation Line; Line 2: Trillium Line; Line 4: Airport Link; Routes 5 to 199: Custom routing that that connects to Line 1 and/or 2; Routes 200 to 299: Connexion (peak-period only routes that connect to the O-Train); Routes 301 to 305: Shopper Routes (limited rural service); Routes 404 to 406: Canadian Tire Centre events; Routes 450 to 456: Lansdowne Park events; Routes 600 to 699: School Routes; Route R1: replaces Line 1 when it is out of service; Route R2: replaces Line 2 when it is out of service; Route R4: replaces Line 4 when it is out of service; Routes N39 to N98: night service (replaces Line 1 and N98 replaces Line 4); White backgrounds: limited service; Last two digits represent service area: 00s and 10s – Central; 20s – Gloucester; 30s – Orléans; 40s – Ottawa East; 50s – Ottawa West; 60s – Kanata, Stittsville; 70s – Barrhaven; 80s – Nepean; 90s – South Keys

Stop	Routes
Stop A Transitway South	70 75 80 99 110 173 275 279 305 671 673 677 683 684 690
Stop B Transitway North	70 75 80 99 110 173 275 279 305 406 456 671 673 677 683 684 690

== Public art ==
Artist Cheryl Pagurek was chosen as the winner of a competition to provide public art in Marketplace Corridor. Her artwork, titled Currents, features video imagery of the Jock River on a large screen. The images in the video present a link between a nearby body of water in an area of urban development.

The images used in Currents are sourced from various collections, including the City of Ottawa Archives, the Canada Science and Technology Museum, the Goulbourn Museum, the Nepean Museum, and private collections. Currents can also be viewed through a mobile device as you commute.
