= Strandherd station =

Strandherd
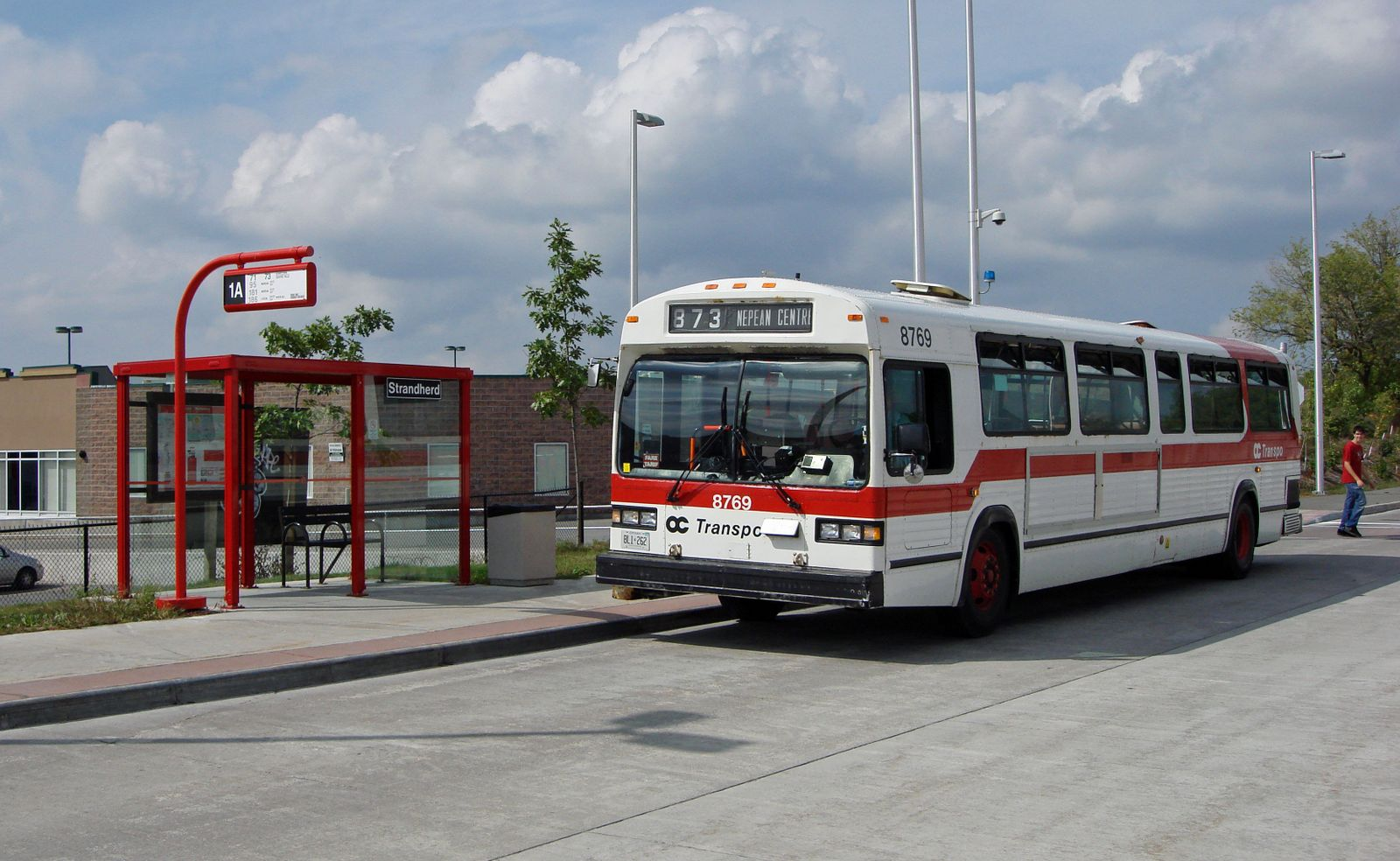
- Strandherd Station in 2008

General information
- Coordinates: 45°16′24″N 75°44′44″W
- Owner: OC Transpo

History
- Opened: January 2, 2007

Services
Preceding station	OC Transpo	Following station
Marketplace toward Cambrian	Route 75	Longfields toward Tunney's Pasture
Location

Strandherd Station is a transit station in Ottawa, Ontario. It opened on January 2, 2007, and contains a park and ride facility with over 300 parking spaces available. It is located northeast of the intersection of Strandherd Drive and the access to the Riocan Marketplace shopping area, where Barrhaven Centre Station and Marketplace Station opened in mid-2012. This is part of OC Transpo's plans to extend its southwest transitway to its suburban areas.

Route 75 was extended to Strandherd Station when the facility opened. The park and ride lot provides additional spaces for south end residents in Barrhaven, Heart's Desire, Davidson Heights and Manotick. Special routes 406 and 456 also serve the station.

Service was improved in 2012, when the new right-of-way (running through a field parallel to Greenbank Road) was finished, and buses now travel without having to stop for traffic signals or getting caught in traffic on Greenbank Road.

== Service ==
The following routes serve Strandherd station as of April 27, 2025:

Key
Line 1 (O-Train) Line 2 (O-Train) Line 4 (O-Train)	O-Train
E1	Shuttle Express
R1 R2 R4	O-Train replacement bus routes
N75	Night routes
40 12	Frequent routes
99 162	Local routes
275	Connexion routes
303	Shopper routes
405	Event routes
646	School routes
STO	Société de transport de l'Outaouais routes
Additional info: Line 1: Confederation Line; Line 2: Trillium Line; Line 4: Airport Link; Routes 5 to 199: Custom routing that that connects to Line 1 and/or 2; Routes 200 to 299: Connexion (peak-period only routes that connect to the O-Train); Routes 301 to 305: Shopper Routes (limited rural service); Routes 404 to 406: Canadian Tire Centre events; Routes 450 to 456: Lansdowne Park events; Routes 600 to 699: School Routes; Route R1: replaces Line 1 when it is out of service; Route R2: replaces Line 2 when it is out of service; Route R4: replaces Line 4 when it is out of service; Routes N39 to N98: night service (replaces Line 1 and N98 replaces Line 4); White backgrounds: limited service; Last two digits represent service area: 00s and 10s – Central; 20s – Gloucester; 30s – Orléans; 40s – Ottawa East; 50s – Ottawa West; 60s – Kanata, Stittsville; 70s – Barrhaven; 80s – Nepean; 90s – South Keys

Stop	Routes
1A Transitway South	70 75 80 173 275 279 305 671 672 677 690
2A Transitway North	70 75 80 173 275 279 305 406 456 671 672 677

== Notes ==
- School trips on Route 80 serve this station instead of Marketplace and Barrhaven Centre

== See also ==
- OC Transpo
- Ottawa Rapid Transit
- OC Transpo Route 95
- OC Transpo Routes
- Barrhaven
- Nepean, Ontario
- Ottawa
