= 2013 Ottawa bus–train crash =

Fatal crash in Ottawa, Canada

Ottawa bus–train crash
- The scene of the crash after the collision. The train, as well as Fallowfield train station, are visible in the background. Photo taken along the tracks looking west.

Details
- Date: 18 September 2013
- Location: Ottawa, Ontario, Canada
- Coordinates: 45°18′10″N 75°44′03″W
- Incident type: Grade crossing collision
- Cause: Obstruction of line

Statistics
- Deaths: 6
- Injured: 35

The Ottawa bus–train crash was a collision that occurred between an OC Transpo double-decker bus and a Via Rail train in the Ottawa suburb of Barrhaven on September 18, 2013, that killed six people.

== Details ==
The train after the collision, derailed

The collision occurred at 8:48 a.m. at a rail crossing near Fallowfield Road and Woodroffe Avenue on the Transitway, the city's dedicated road for buses.

The train, Via Rail #51 (pulled by General Electric P42 Genesis locomotive #915), departed Ottawa at 8:32 a.m., bound for Toronto. The bus, OC Transpo Route 76 (an Alexander Dennis Enviro500 double-decker #8017), had just departed from Fallowfield Transitway Station with 83 people aboard. The crossing's gates, lights, and bells engaged 47 seconds before the crash, and its gates were fully horizontal across the road 25 seconds before the crash. The train rang its bell but did not sound its whistle, due to a municipal whistle ban in effect between 8:00 p.m. and noon. The train was travelling at 75 kilometres per hour (47 mph) at the time of the collision – below its speed limit of 161 km/h (100 mph) – and its emergency brakes were applied 2 seconds prior to the collision. The bus was travelling at 67.6 km/h (42.0 mph) – above its speed limit of 60 km/h (37 mph) – before its brakes were applied, which occurred 3 seconds before the crash; the full force of the brakes was not initially applied. The collision sheared off the front end of the bus and derailed the train.

Five occupants of the bus were pronounced dead at the scene of the accident (including the bus driver) and one later died in hospital, while thirty-five occupants were injured, five seriously. None of the train's passengers or crew were injured.

Canadian Prime Minister Stephen Harper and Ontario Premier Kathleen Wynne were among those who offered condolences to the victims of the crash and their families. The bus and the train involved in the crash were both removed from the scene on September 19, 2013. Via Rail train service resumed through the area in the morning of September 20, 2013. A community memorial was held for all of the victims of the crash at Cedarview Alliance Church on September 22, 2013, where funerals for two of the victims were also held later in the week. Ottawa Mayor Jim Watson was among those who attended the community memorial.

== Investigation ==
The crash was investigated by the Transportation Safety Board of Canada (TSB). The TSB was not able to identify any issue with the track's condition or the operation of the train. The bus driver did not have any drugs or alcohol in his system and did not have any medical conditions that would have led to the crash. On September 28, 2013, TSB investigators and Ottawa Police investigators returned to the site of the incident in order to reenact the crash and collect more information on what might have led to the collision.

=== Interim measures ===
On October 16, 2013, based on early observations made by the TSB, Ottawa's transit commission, in the body's first meeting since the crash, outlined four new safety improvements for the level crossing that was the site of the crash. These measures were clearing trees and brush from the area of the crash site to improve visibility, reducing the speed along the Transitway approaching the level crossing from 60 to 50 kilometres per hour (37 to 31 mph), installing bigger signs, and installing a new early warning light to caution buses when a train is coming. The city stated that these measures would only be extended to the crossing where the crash occurred and that these observations made by the TSB should not be confused with causes of the crash.

In late fall of 2013, the City of Ottawa hired the consultant firm MMM Group to study whether or not the OC Transpo buses should be required to stop at all rail crossings as is done in many other regions in Canada. The results of the MMM group study were released on April 9, 2014, and suggested that requiring buses to stop at railway crossings actually increases collisions between buses and trains by 17 percent, prompting OC Transpo not to change their policy on the matter.

On January 9, 2014, the City of Ottawa was ordered by Employment and Social Development Canada (ESDC), as part of its workplace safety investigation of the crash, to assess the safety of each railway crossing in the city where OC Transpo buses and trains have the potential of coming into contact.

On February 25, 2014, the TSB sent two letters to the City of Ottawa. The first addressed four incidents that happened in the months following the bus and train collision where buses went through the crossing involved after its warning lights started flashing but before its gates closed. This first letter recommended that the city take additional measures to ensure that buses are able to safely stop at level crossings when the warning lights are activated. The second letter addressed another incident that happened on February 14, 2014, at the same level crossing where one gate stayed down and the warning lights remained on after the train had passed. This second letter recommends that OC Transpo and Via Rail create standard operating procedures for dealing with malfunctioning automated level crossings. Further malfunctions of Via Rail crossings near the site of the crash led then Foreign Affair Minister and local MP John Baird to call for the resignation of Via Rail President Steve Del Bosco, who was later replaced as president by Yves Desjardins-Siciliano.

On September 24, 2014, the TSB gave a progress update on the investigation. The update mentioned two potential factors in the crash: the speed of the bus, which exceeded the speed limit and affected its stopping distance, and a video screen located above the driver's work station used to monitor passengers on the upper level of the bus. The update stated that a passenger who was standing at the time of the crash or a similar situation may have caused a distraction. The update recommended that the video screen should go blank when the bus is moving and that more should be done to monitor bus speed, particularly around railroad crossings.

In July 2015, a draft of the TSB's report was submitted to the City of Ottawa and Via Rail.

=== Final report ===
On December 2, 2015, the report of the TSB found that the driver of the bus was most likely distracted by the video screens that he was required to monitor as part of his job. The report also made recommendations to Transport Canada to develop guidelines for the use of in-vehicle video screens to reduce distraction, to develop crashworthiness standards for passenger buses, to equip passenger buses with crashworthy event data recorders, and to develop specific guidance for grade separation. The last recommendation of the report was for the City of Ottawa to review the need for grade separation at the level crossings at Woodroffe Avenue, Transitway and Fallowfield Road.

== Aftermath ==
On July 11, 2014, the City of Ottawa decided to retire OC Transpo route 76, replacing it with route 72 in the fall schedule. On the first anniversary of the incident, city facility flags were lowered to half-mast. In October 2015, a memorial park was opened beside the Fallowfield Park and Ride which features six sections honouring each of the six victims.

On August 18, 2017, a survivor of the crash committed suicide. His family believes that his mental illness had been triggered by the events of the crash.

Several lawsuits were filed against the City of Ottawa and the estate of the bus driver by families of those who died in the crash as well as survivors. By September 19, 2017, of the 39 lawsuits filed against the city, collectively claiming $26 million, 31 had been settled with actual settlement payments totalling $8 million. By January 18, 2019, 35 of the 39 lawsuits had been settled, with the total payout rising to $9.7 million.

On February 26, 2016, the City of Ottawa stated that it will study whether underpasses or overpasses are required at five of the city's railway crossings, including the crossing involved in the crash.

Out of respect for the incident, Strathcona County Transit skipped the numbering of 8017 when their new Enviro500s were introduced in 2016.

== See also ==
- Fallowfield railway station (Ontario)
- 2019 Westboro Station bus crash
- List of deadliest Canadian traffic accidents
- List of rail accidents in Canada
- List of rail accidents (2010–2019)
