= Vimy Memorial Bridge =

Bridge in southern Ottawa, Canada

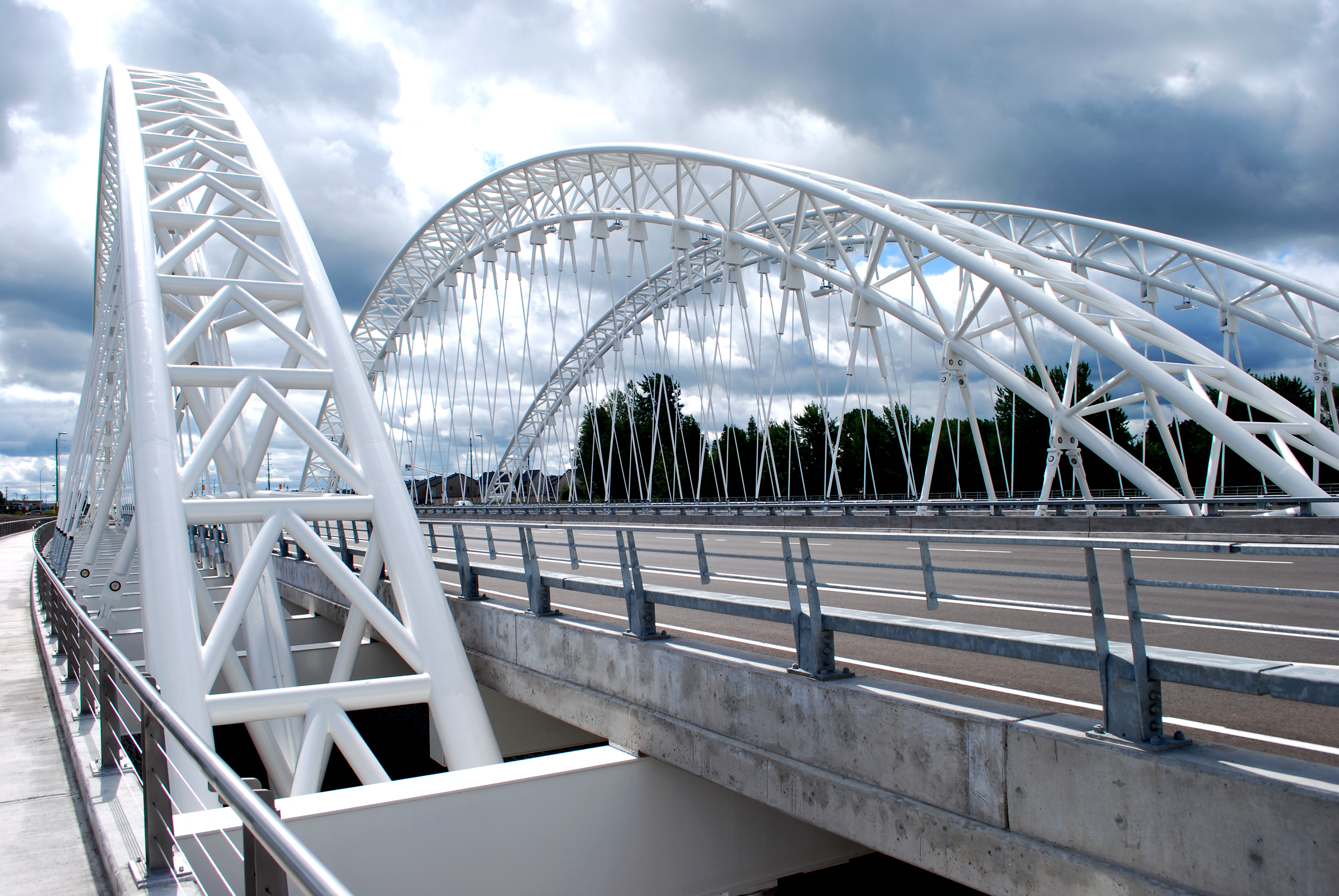
- Coordinates: 45.26991°N 75.70245°W
- Carries: vehicles (2x3 lanes) buses (2x1 lane) bicycles (2x1 lane)
- Crosses: Rideau River, Rideau Canal
- Locale: southern Ottawa
- Other name: Strandherd-Armstrong Bridge
- Website: ottawa.ca/en/city_hall/planningprojectsreports/construction/projects/strandherd_bridge/index.html
- Preceded by: Manotick
- Followed by: Hunt Club Road

Characteristics
- Design: triangular-truss arches, with two suspended decks
- Material: Steel
- Total length: 143 metres (469 ft)

History
- Construction cost: $50 million CAD
- Opened: 12 July 2014

Statistics
- Toll: free

Location
- Interactive map of Vimy Memorial Bridge

The Vimy Memorial Bridge (previously the Strandherd-Armstrong Bridge) is a bridge in Ottawa, Ontario, Canada. Completed in 2014, it crosses the Rideau River, connecting Strandherd Drive in Barrhaven and Earl Armstrong Road in Riverside South. The bridge was the 2015 winner of the Gustav Lindenthal Medal. It is named after the Battle of Vimy Ridge during World War I, as suggested by two Royal Canadian Legions in Ottawa.

== History ==
The idea for a bridge in this location was first brought up in 1993 as a road bridge. The location was later revisited as the location for a light rail crossing for the O-Train, but that extension plan was cancelled. In 2010, the city, provincial, and national governments invested equal amounts totalling $48 million in building the bridge. The original contractor hired, ConCreate USL, went into receivership when the project was about 60% complete and the bonding company, GCNA hired a new contractor, formed by former employees of ConCreate, now known as Horseshoe Hill Construction, to complete its bonded work. The project was initially expected to be completed in 2012. However, due to the contractor going bankrupt and the city's bonding company refusing to accelerate work, the completion date was delayed. The bridge was then due to be open in September 2014 but opened earlier than expected, on 12 July 2014.

== Features ==
The bridge has three vehicle lanes, a dedicated bus lane, and a bike lane in each direction. Pedestrian walkways are located on the outside of the bridge on both the north and south side.

== Public transit ==
The bridge's exclusive bus lanes are a part of the Ottawa bus rapid transit system known as the Transitway and are utilized by OC Transpo routes 74 and 99. OC Transpo Route 74 is a high frequency rapid transit route that runs from line 1 at Tunney's Pasture to line 2 Limebank station via Baseline station at Algonquin College and Barrhaven. The route is shared with OC Transpo Route 75 from Tunney's Pasture to Fallowfield Station. From there route 75 continues on the Transitway to Barrhaven Centre station or Cambrian (at Greenbank). Route 74 leaves the Transitway temporarily to drive south on Woodroffe Ave until it reaches Nepean Woods station, from which it crosses the Vimy Memorial Bridge on the way to Limebank Station. OC Transpo Route 99 operates in both directions from Hurdman station to Barrhaven Centre station via the southeastern Transitway, serves Riverside South via Spratt Road and connects to O-Train Line 2 at Greenboro station, which serves as its northeastern terminus in off-peak hours. During peak hours the route 99 continues onto Hurdman station through Billings Bridge station. The new bridge's exclusive bus lanes have improved transit service in Barrhaven and Riverside South.
