= Nepean Woods station =

Nepean Woods
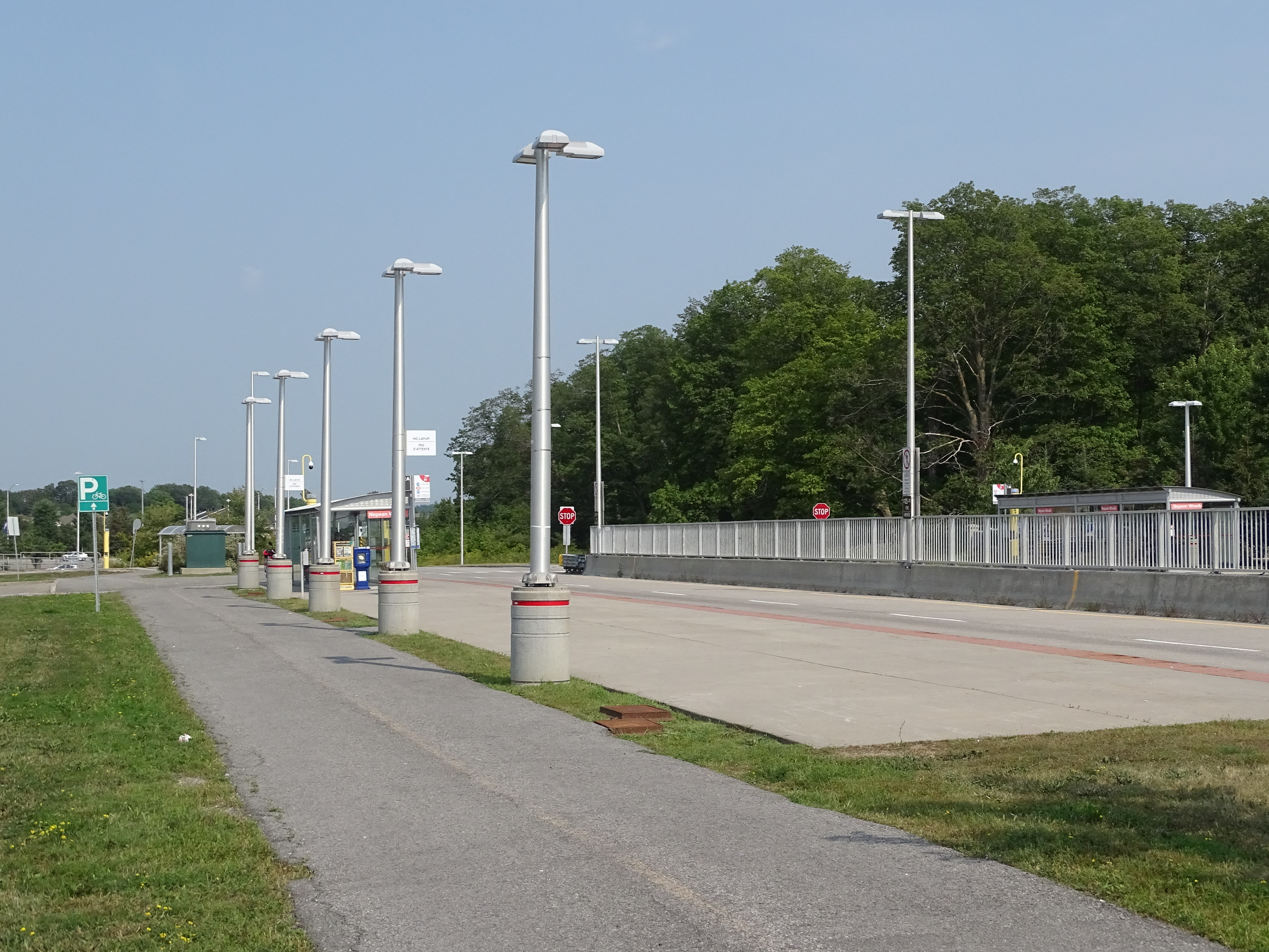

General information
- Location: Woodroffe Avenue, Barrhaven; Ottawa, Ontario; Canada
- Coordinates: 45°16′29″N 75°42′59″W
- Owner: OC Transpo

Construction
- Parking: 342 spaces

History
- Opened: April 21, 2013

Services
Preceding station	OC Transpo	Following station
Riverview toward Limebank	Route 74	Fallowfield toward Tunney's Pasture
Beatrice toward Barrhaven Centre	Route 99	Limebank Terminus
Beatrice toward Innovation	Route 110	Riverview toward Limebank
Location

Nepean Woods station is located in the Ottawa, Ontario, Canada suburb of Barrhaven, and is on the Southwest Transitway which is served by OC Transpo buses. Located near the intersection of Woodroffe Avenue and Strandherd Drive in southern Nepean, it was the westerly terminus of most trips of rapid-transit route 74, formerly numbered route 94. It is also the site of a park and ride lot for residents of Barrhaven, which opened on 24 February 2014.

In 2014, selected trips on route 74 (then 94) were extended to/from Riverview station via the then-newly opened Vimy Memorial Bridge. Route 99 has selected trips extended via the bridge and Nepean Woods Station to/from Barrhaven Centre Station. In 2024, in anticipation of the opening of O-Train Line 2, Route 74 was extended to terminate at Limebank station, restoring service to Riverview station after being truncated to terminate at Nepean Woods for 3 years as well as connecting it to the new line.

== Service ==
The following routes serve Nepean Woods station as of April 27, 2025:

Key
Line 1 (O-Train) Line 2 (O-Train) Line 4 (O-Train)	O-Train
E1	Shuttle Express
R1 R2 R4	O-Train replacement bus routes
N75	Night routes
40 12	Frequent routes
99 162	Local routes
275	Connexion routes
303	Shopper routes
405	Event routes
646	School routes
STO	Société de transport de l'Outaouais routes
Additional info: Line 1: Confederation Line; Line 2: Trillium Line; Line 4: Airport Link; Routes 5 to 199: Custom routing that that connects to Line 1 and/or 2; Routes 200 to 299: Connexion (peak-period only routes that connect to the O-Train); Routes 301 to 305: Shopper Routes (limited rural service); Routes 404 to 406: Canadian Tire Centre events; Routes 450 to 456: Lansdowne Park events; Routes 600 to 699: School Routes; Route R1: replaces Line 1 when it is out of service; Route R2: replaces Line 2 when it is out of service; Route R4: replaces Line 4 when it is out of service; Routes N39 to N98: night service (replaces Line 1 and N98 replaces Line 4); White backgrounds: limited service; Last two digits represent service area: 00s and 10s – Central; 20s – Gloucester; 30s – Orléans; 40s – Ottawa East; 50s – Ottawa West; 60s – Kanata, Stittsville; 70s – Barrhaven; 80s – Nepean; 90s – South Keys

Stop	Routes
1A	70 74 80 99 110 277
2A	70 74 80 99 110 406
