= Longfields station =

Bus station in Ottawa, Canada

Longfields
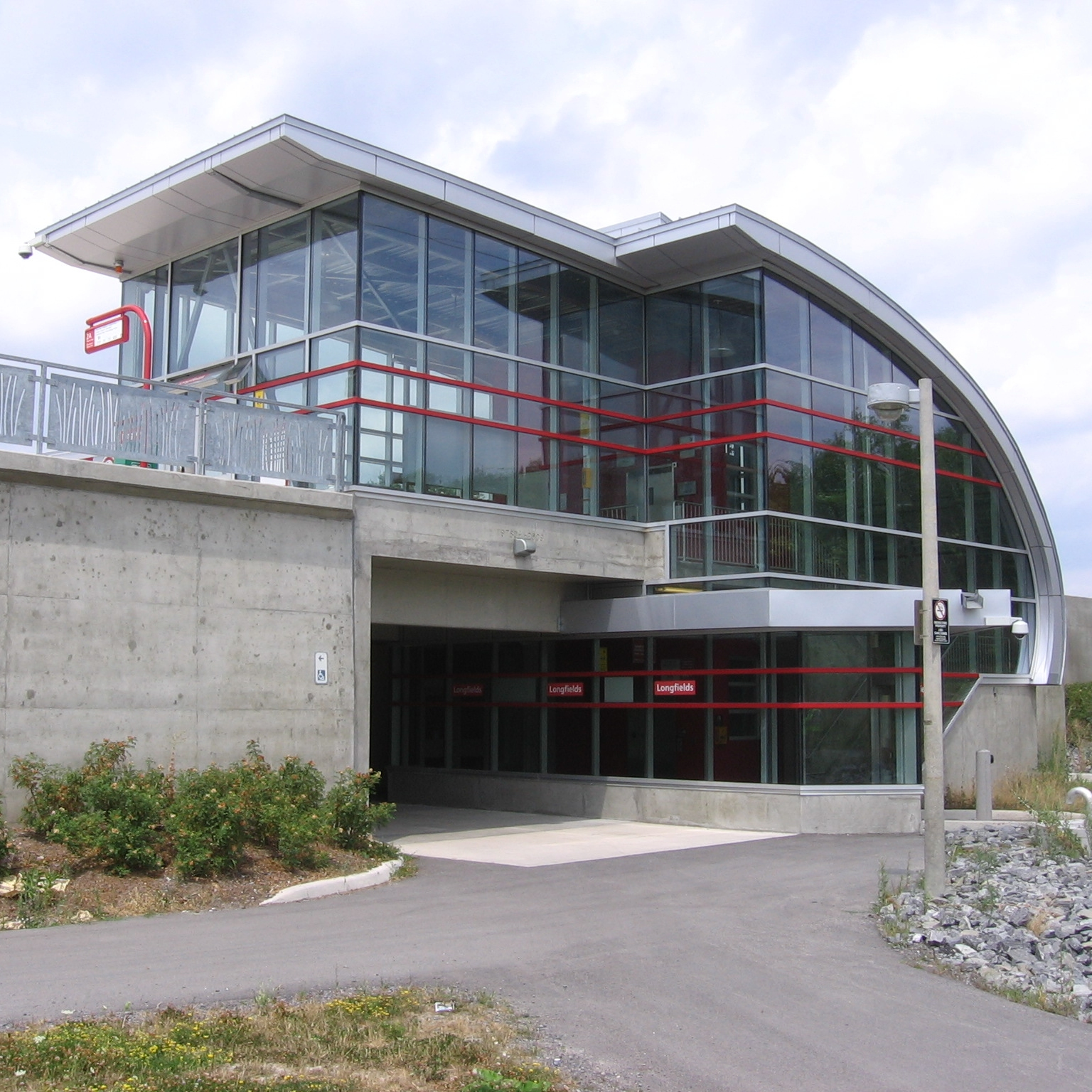
- Longfields station, 2012

General information
- Location: Longfields
- Coordinates: 45°17′06″N 75°44′50″W
- Owner: OC Transpo

History
- Opened: April 17, 2011

Services
Preceding station	OC Transpo	Following station
Strandherd toward Cambrian	Route 75	Fallowfield toward Tunney's Pasture
Location

Longfields is an Ottawa Transitway station in the Longfields neighbourhood of Ottawa, Ontario, Canada (Barrhaven). The station is located on a route that runs along the south side of the CNR railway line southwest from Fallowfield Station towards Strandherd Station.

Located close to the station are École élémentaire catholique Pierre-Elliott-Trudeau, Mother Teresa High School and Longfields-Davidson Heights Secondary School.

== Public art ==
Bronze sculptures created by Erin Robertson and Anna Williams entitled, Bellwether, were installed at the Longfield Transit Station in 2011. The artwork is composed of life-sized sculptures of four sheep and a border collie herding them across a green roof.

Bellwether is a permanent sculptural installation, primarily located on the vegetative roofs of the transit station, which consists of four life-sized sheep and one life-sized Border collie sheepdog all cast in bronze and finished with patina.

Bellwether is intended to create an overall sense of the movement of a community through a designated space. It investigates the subtleties of various roles and relationships within established groups. Playfully comparing the contemporary public transit system to traditional agricultural herding practices, the installation is suggestive of social cooperation and adaptation which are both characteristics of an effective transit system.

== Service ==
The following routes currently serve Longfields Station:

Longfields Station Service
Frequent routes	75
Local routes	173
Connexion routes	275 279
Shopper routes	305
Event routes	406 456
