= Fallowfield station (Ontario) =

Bus and train station in Ottawa, Ontario, Canada

Fallowfield
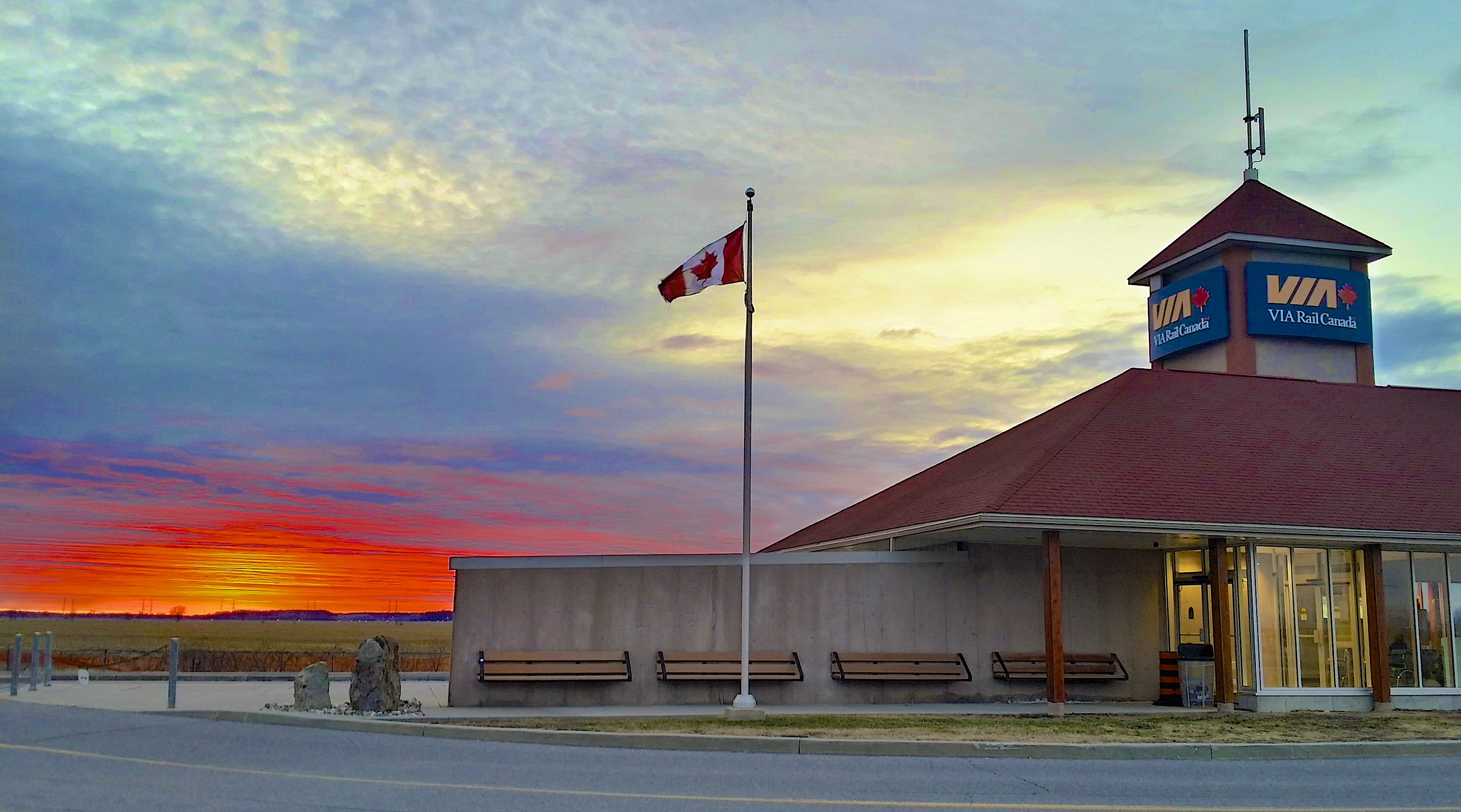
- Sunset at Fallowfield station

General information
- Location: 3347 Fallowfield Road, Ottawa, Ontario; Canada
- Coordinates: 45°17′57″N 75°44′12″W
- Owner: Via Rail
- Line: Corridor
- Platforms: 1 side platform and 1 island platform (low-level)
- Tracks: 2
- Connections

Construction
- Structure type: At-grade
- Parking: 107 spaces (Indigo Parking)
- Accessible: Yes

Other information
- Status: Staffed station
- Station code: Via Rail: FALL
- Website: Fallowfield train station

History
- Opened: 2002; 24 years ago

Services
| Preceding station | Via Rail | Following station |
|---|---|---|
| Smiths Falls toward Toronto | Toronto–Ottawa | Ottawa Terminus |
Location
- Location within Ottawa Location within Southern Ontario Location within Ontario Location within Canada

Fallowfield station (French: gare de Fallowfield) or Fallowfield Train Station is an inter-city passenger railway station and bus rapid transit station located at 3347 Fallowfield Road in the suburban neighbourhood of Barrhaven in Ottawa, Ontario, Canada.

== Location ==
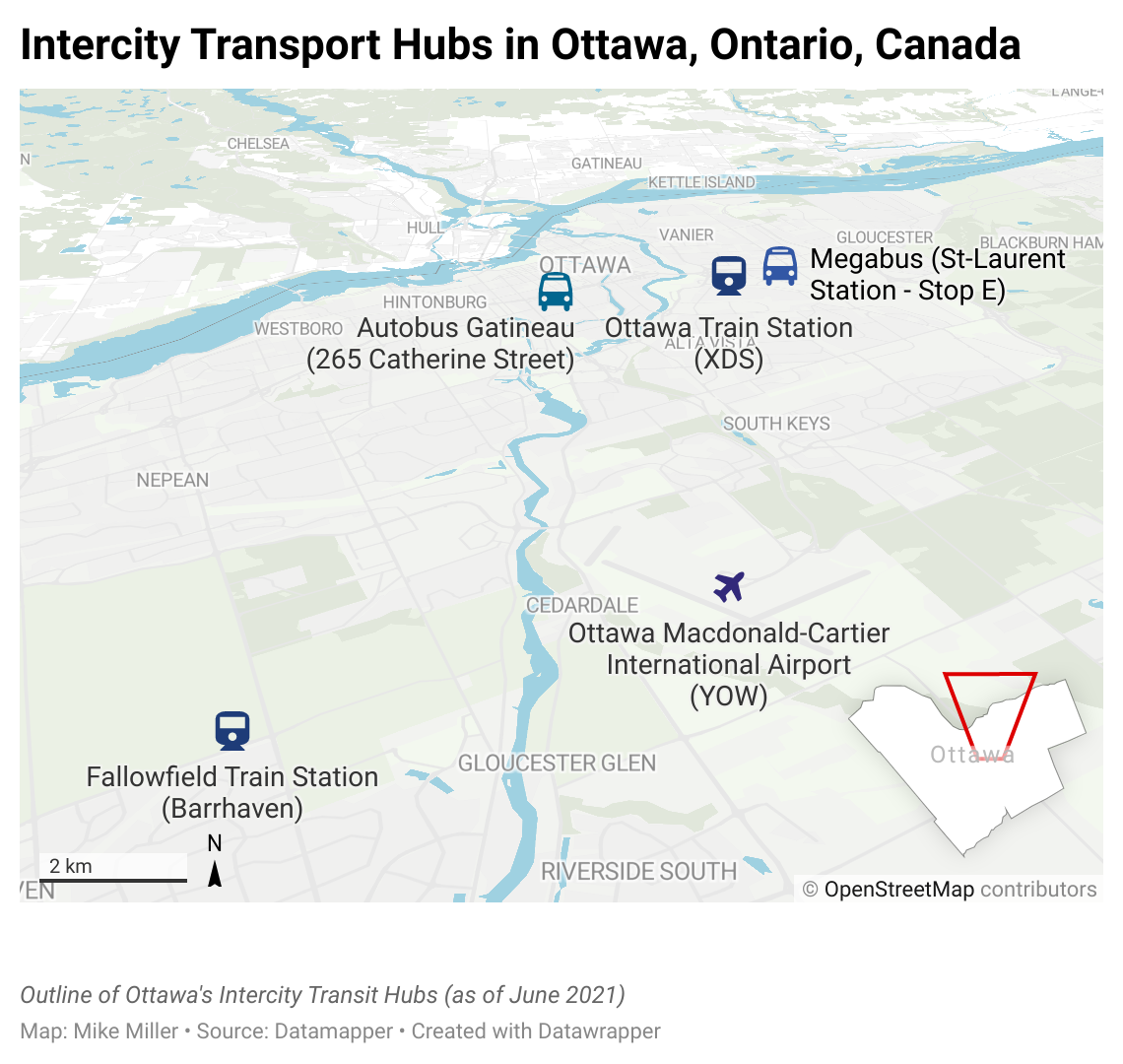
Intercity Transport Hubs in Ottawa, Ontario, Canada

Fallowfield station is located on the north side of Fallowfield Road (Regional Road 12) just west of its intersection with Woodroffe Avenue. The main station entrance faces southeast towards a short access road (Via Park Place) which connects the station to Fallowfield Road. On the northwest side of the station, trains call at 1 low-level side platform and two tracks bordering on agricultural lands of the Ottawa Greenbelt. Small paid parking lots are located to either side of the station, while to the southeast lies an OC Transpo Transitway bus rapid transit station and a large commuter park and ride parking lot.

The station is located southwest of downtown Ottawa on the edge of a low-density residential neighbourhood. The closest hotels are more than 5 kilometres to the northeast near Hunt Club Road and the Ottawa Macdonald–Cartier International Airport. South of the station, on the other side of Fallowfield Road, are various fast food franchises, including a McDonald's, Tim Hortons and a Gabriel Pizza location inside a small strip mall. Additional food options in the area are located more than a kilometre to the west on Fallowfield Road.

Fallowfield station is located approximately 12 kilometres to the west of the Ottawa Macdonald–Cartier International Airport.

== Station facilities ==
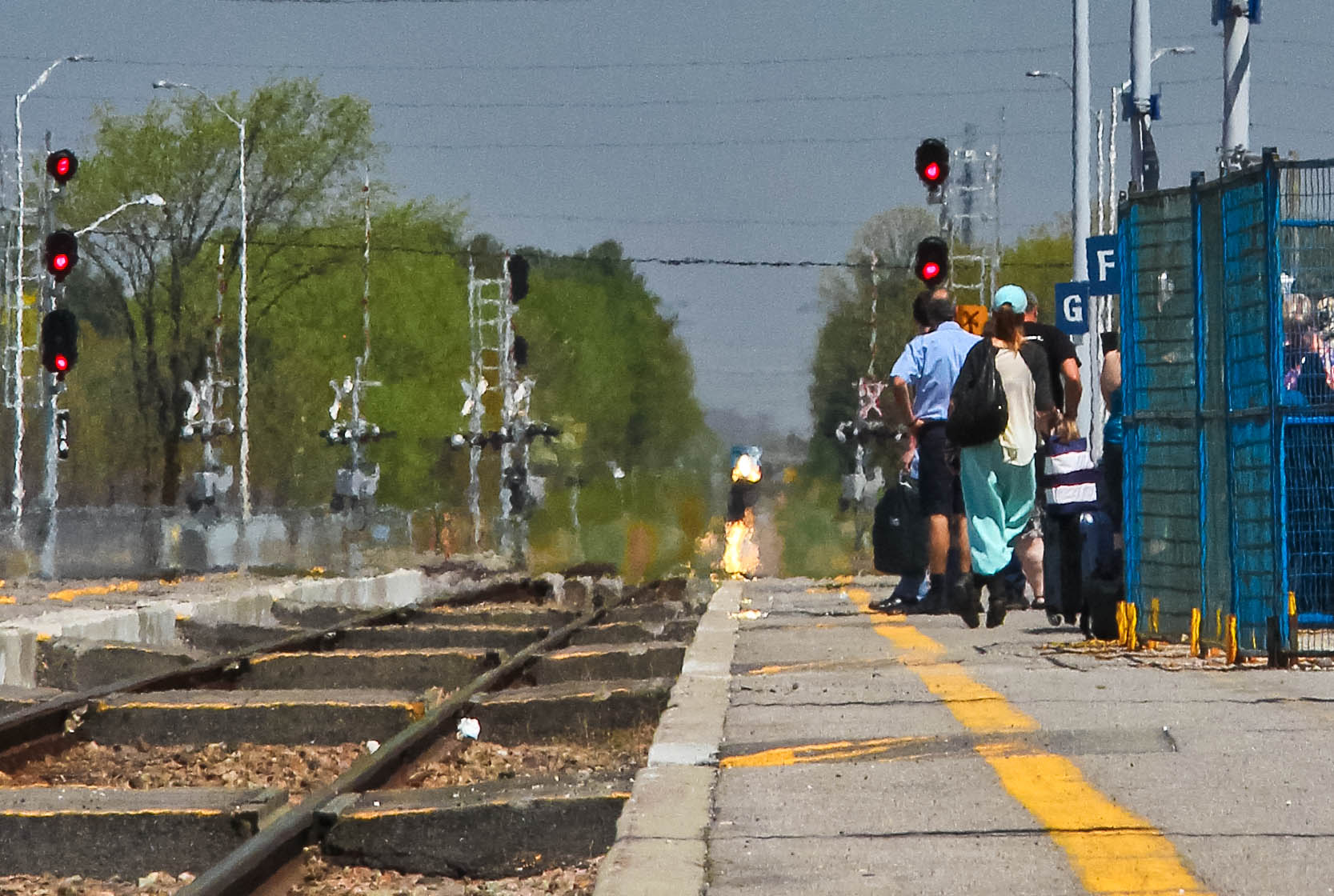
Train approaching Fallowfield station platform on a hot day

The wheelchair accessible station is staffed and the building is equipped with a ticket office, waiting room, vending machines, washrooms and Wi-Fi internet access.

1709 surface lot parking spaces are available in the OC Transpo park and ride lot south of the station, while the 107 paid parking spots on either side of the train station are managed by Indigo Parking. Hourly and monthly rates are available.

== Railway services ==
Fallowfield station is served by all trains on Via Rail's Toronto-Ottawa route. As of October 2023, the station is served by 8 to 10 trains per day in each direction.

== Transitway station ==
Fallowfield
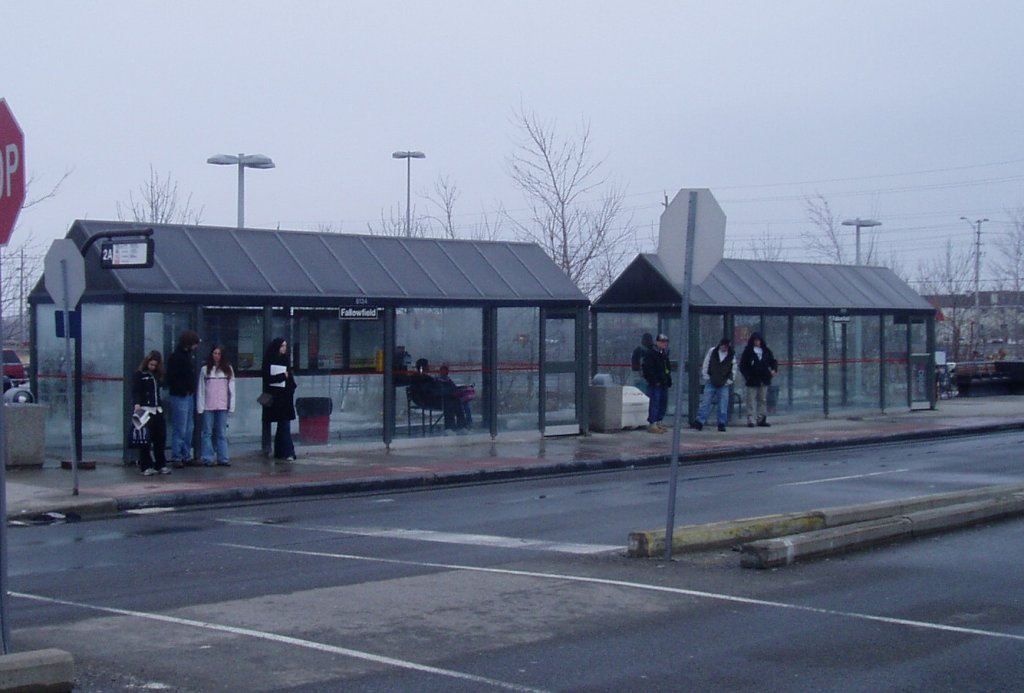
- Fallowfield bus platforms

General information
- Owner: OC Transpo
- Connections: Corridor

Construction
- Structure type: at-grade
- Parking: (OC Transpo Park & Ride); 1709 spaces including: 28 accessible spaces 3 expectant mother spaces 4 electric charging spaces
- Cycle facilities: Bike rack/shelter Bike repair station

Other information
- Station code: 3043
- Website: Fallowfield

History
- Opened: 2000; 26 years ago

Services
| Preceding station | OC Transpo | Following station |
|---|---|---|
| Nepean Woods toward Limebank | Route 74 | Baseline toward Tunney's Pasture |
| Longfields toward Cambrian | Route 75 | Baseline toward Tunney's Pasture |
Location

Southeast of the train station entrance is an OC Transpo Transitway bus stop (Fallowfield Transitway Station) offering frequent bus service to the west end of Ottawa and downtown. The following routes serve Fallowfield as of April 27, 2025:

Fallowfield station service
| Frequent routes | 74 75 |
| Local routes | 70 73 173 |
| Connexion routes | 275 277 279 |
| Shopper routes | 305 |
| Event routes | 406 456 |
| School routes | 682 |

=== Future plans ===
- The City of Ottawa plans to extend O-Train Line 1 to Fallowfield station sometime after 2031.

== Incidents ==
The 2013 Ottawa bus–train crash took place on September 18, 2013, between an OC Transpo bus and a Via train, at a level crossing located north of Fallowfield station. Six bus passengers died and several people were injured as a result.
