= Longfields =

- Neighbourhood
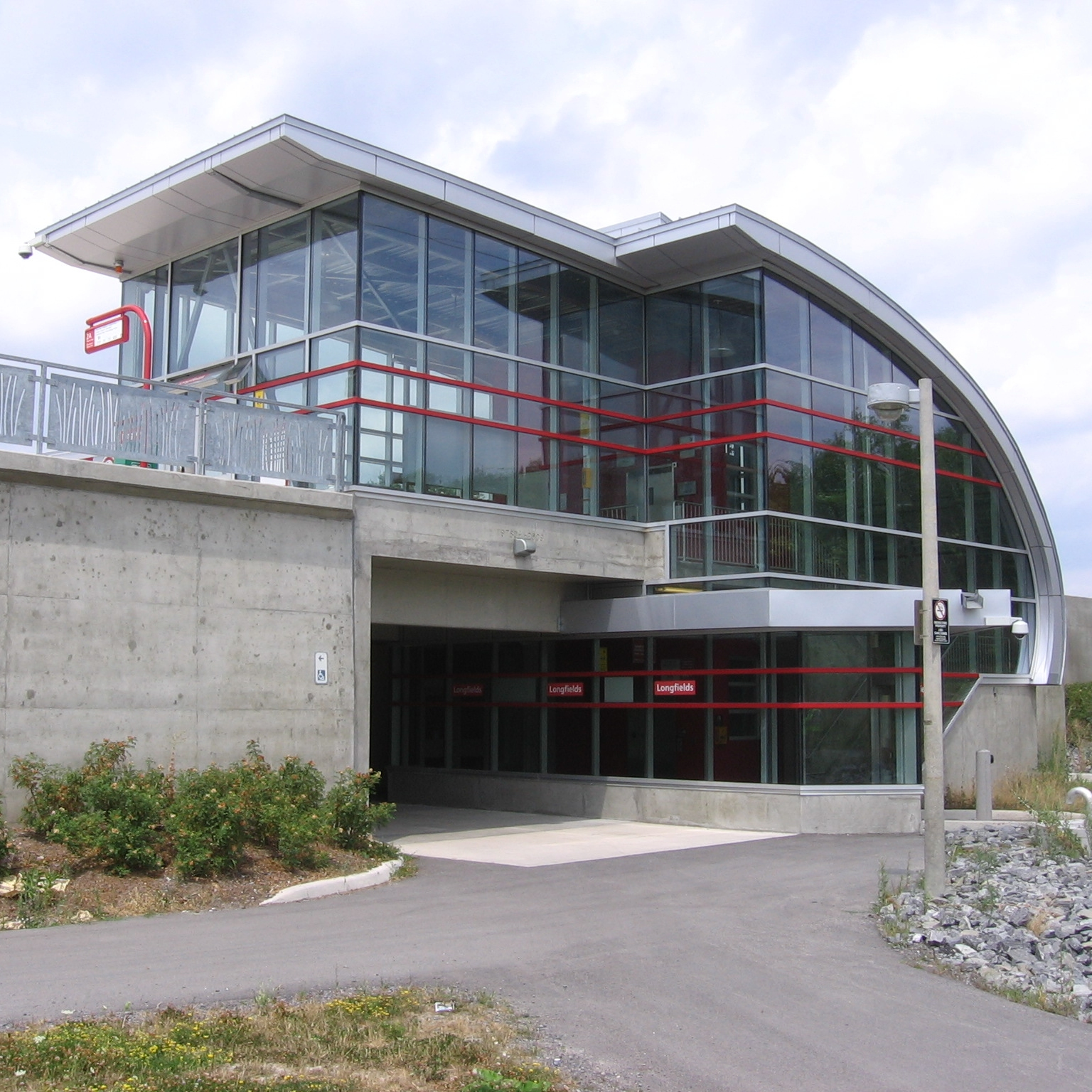
- Longfields Transit Station Barrhaven, soon after it opened in 2012

- Location within Ontario
- Coordinates: 45°17′15″N 75°44′00″W
- Country: Canada
- City: Ottawa
- Ward: Barrhaven

Area
  - Total: 4.609 km^{2} (1.780 sq mi)

Population (2016)
  - Total: 19,763
  - Density: 4,288/km^{2} (11,110/sq mi)
- Canada 2016 Census

Longfields is a neighbourhood in Barrhaven Ward in Ottawa, Ontario. This recent neighbourhood is located within the growing suburb of Barrhaven in the city's southwest and is bordered by Greenbank Road to the west, Strandherd Drive to the south, Woodroffe Avenue to the east, the CNR railway on the northwest and Fallowfield Road to the north.

Longfields was mostly built in the early 1990s during a period of major expansion. Barrhaven's most recent high school, Longfields-Davidson Heights Secondary School, is located in this neighbourhood. A station in the transitway corridor (also named Longfields) was built and opened in the Spring of 2011 .

There are also plans for major development south of Longfields with a large employment zone as well as a possible expansion of the O-Train north-south light rail project.

== See also ==
- List of Ottawa neighbourhoods
- Barrhaven
