= Riverview station =

Riverview station may refer to:

- Riverview station (Ottawa), a transit station in Canada
- Riverview railway station, a train station in Ipswich, Australia
