= Riverview station (Ottawa) =

Riverview
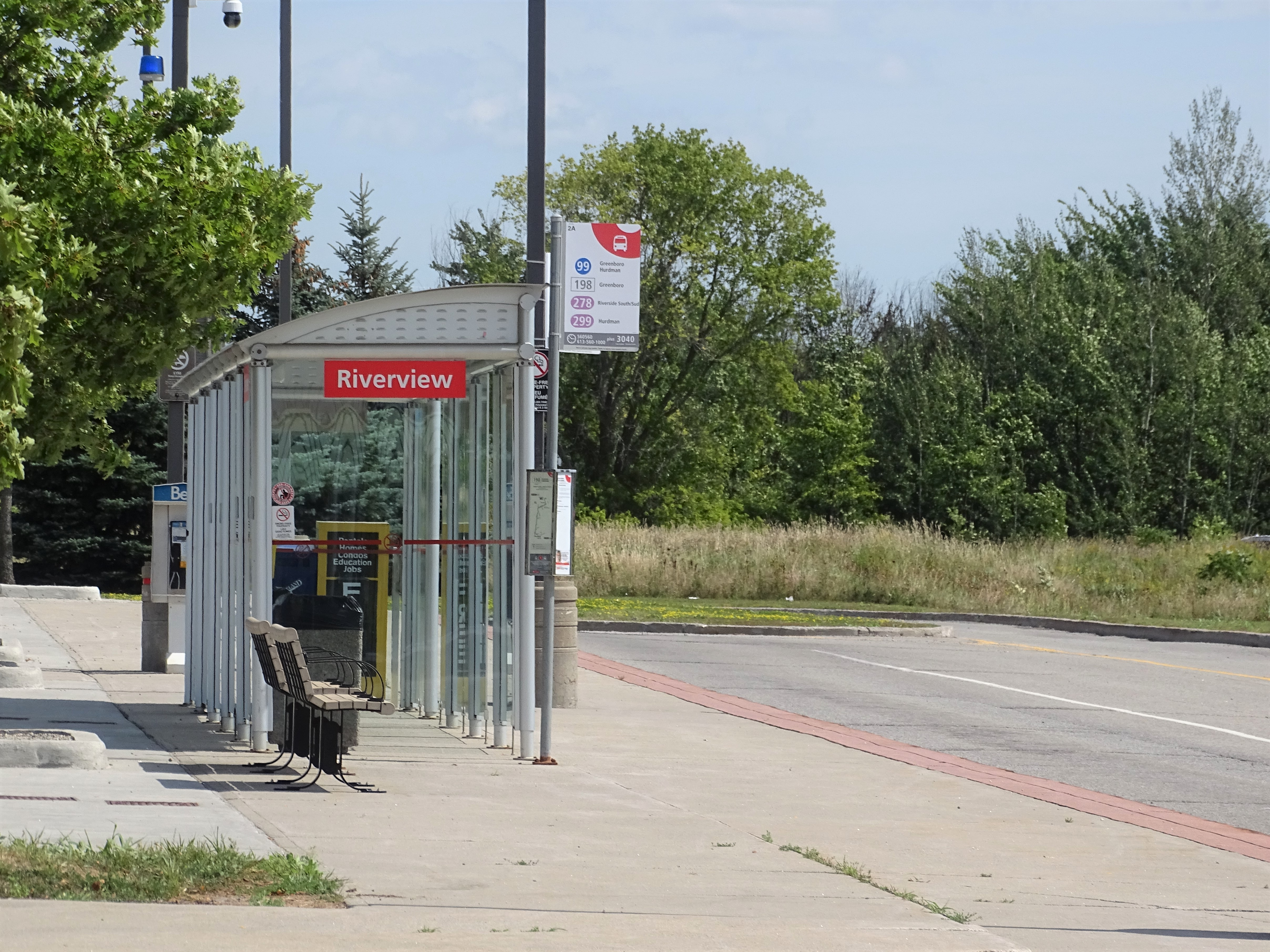

General information
- Location: Earl Armstrong Road, Ottawa, Ontario; Canada
- Coordinates: 45°16′07″N 75°41′41″W
- Owner: OC Transpo

Construction
- Parking: 381 spaces

History
- Opened: 2009

Services
Preceding station	OC Transpo	Following station
Nepean Woods toward Tunney's Pasture	Route 74	Limebank Terminus
Nepean Woods toward Innovation	Route 110	Limebank Terminus
Location

Riverview is an OC Transpo bus station and park and ride located in the Riverside South community in Ottawa, Ontario. The station is located south of Earl Armstrong Road east of River Road.

Riverview was officially designated as a Transitway station in the 2009 system map and was part of an eventual rapid transit corridor that would link with the existing Southeast Transitway that ends at Hunt Club Road and South Keys Shopping Centre. The corridor was intended for a previous light-rail extension towards Riverside South which was cancelled in 2006.

The station is located just east of the Vimy Memorial Bridge which was completed in July 2014 and connects Riverside South with Barrhaven across the Rideau River. A rapid transit corridor along Strandherd Drive and Earl Armstrong Road is planned and would eventually connect to the Southwest Transitway near Greenbank Road and Strandherd Drive.

== Service ==
The following routes currently serve Riverview:

Riverview station service
Frequent routes	74
Local routes	70 73 110 198
Connexion routes	283
Event routes	406
School routes	99 676 680

- As of April 2025, Route 99 does not serve this station except for school trips serving St. Francis Xavier which travel between Riverview and the school. Additionally, route 70 (formerly 170) and 73 serve this station.
- Only one school trip from Route 80 serves this station during PM hours only.
- School route 699 is available at the intersection of Brian Good Avenue and Earl Armstrong Road but does not serve this station.
