= Transitway (Ottawa) =

Bus rapid transit system in Ottawa, Canada

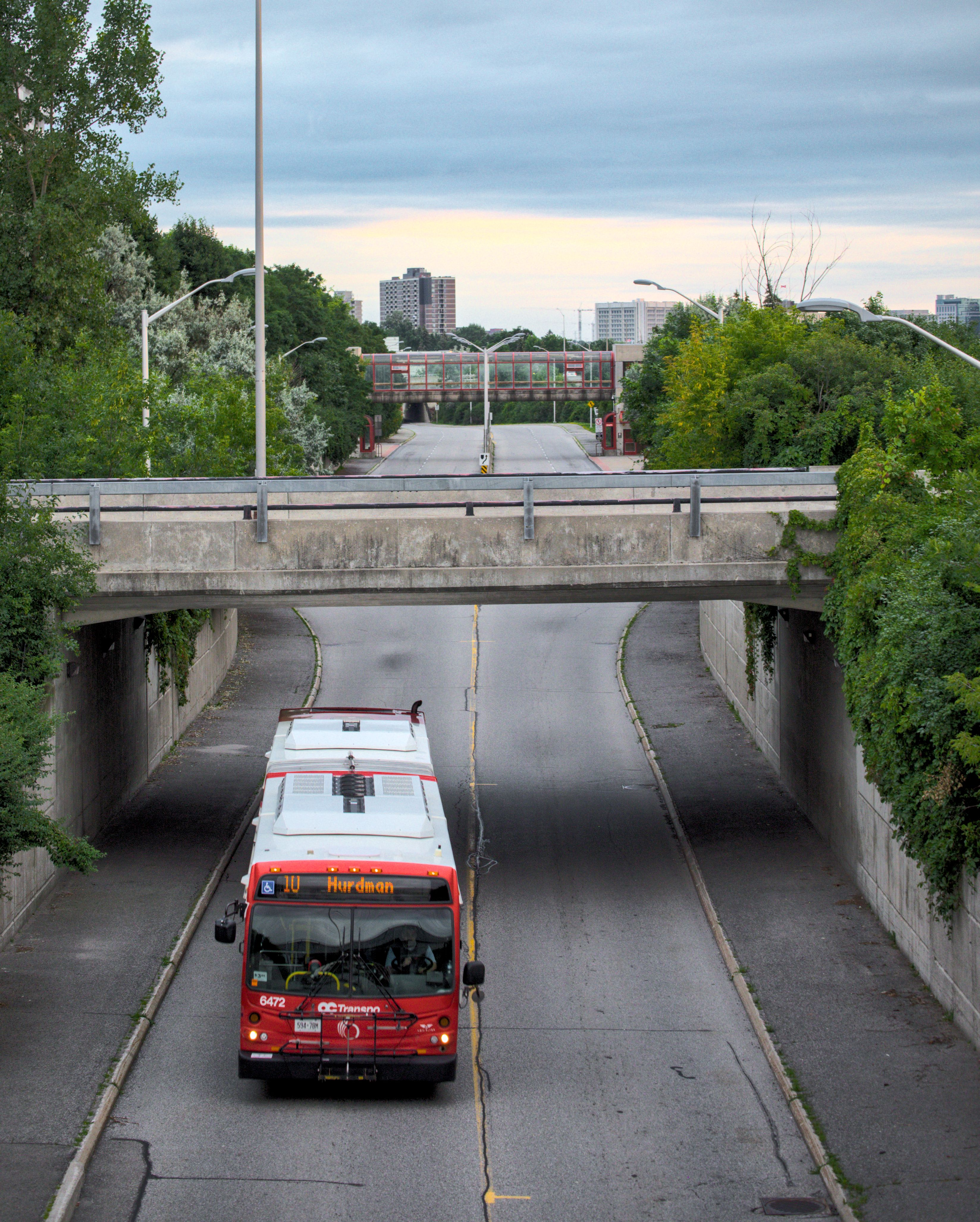

Overview
- Owner: City of Ottawa
- Locale: Ottawa, Ontario, Canada
- Transit type: Bus rapid transit
- Number of lines: 12
- Number of stations: 57
- Website: Rapid route network

Operation
- Began operation: 1983
- Operator: OC Transpo

Technical
- System length: 59 km (37 mi)
System map
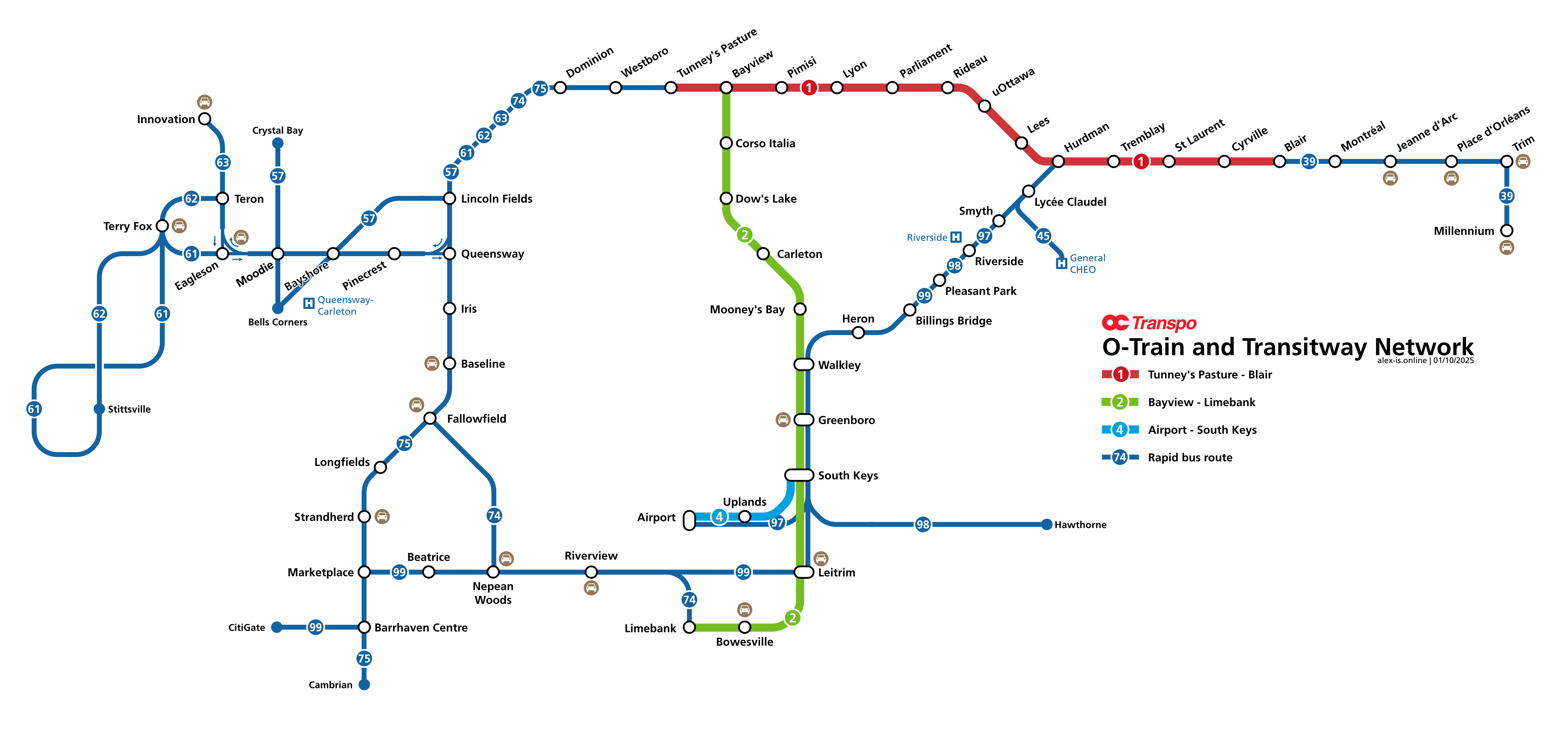

The Transitway is a bus rapid transit (BRT) network operated by OC Transpo in Ottawa, Ontario, Canada. It comprises a series of bus-only roadways and reserved lanes on city streets and highways. The dedicated busways ensure that buses and emergency vehicles on the Transitway rarely intersect directly with regular traffic, making it possible to run quickly and consistently, even during rush hour traffic. OC Transpo operates a network of rapid routes which use the Transitway to connect communities with the O-Train light rail system. Additional bus routes also use segments of the Transitway.

The Transitway opened in 1983 with five stations. The network expanded greatly to include over fifty stations at its peak.

In the 2010s, the central segment of the Transitway began reaching capacity, with buses bumper to bumper. To combat this, segments of the Transitway were closed in 2015 to allow conversion to a higher capacity light rail line, which opened in 2019 as the Confederation Line. More segments of the Transitway have been closed since construction began on Stage 2 of the O-Train expansion, and more will be converted when Stage 3 begins.

Ottawa's Transitway has been seen as a prime example of bus rapid transit internationally, and has influenced the design and creation of other systems worldwide. The Ottawa Transitway has also been used as a model for how to design bus rapid transit, such as is the case for Brisbane, Australia and Mississauga, among others.

== Design ==
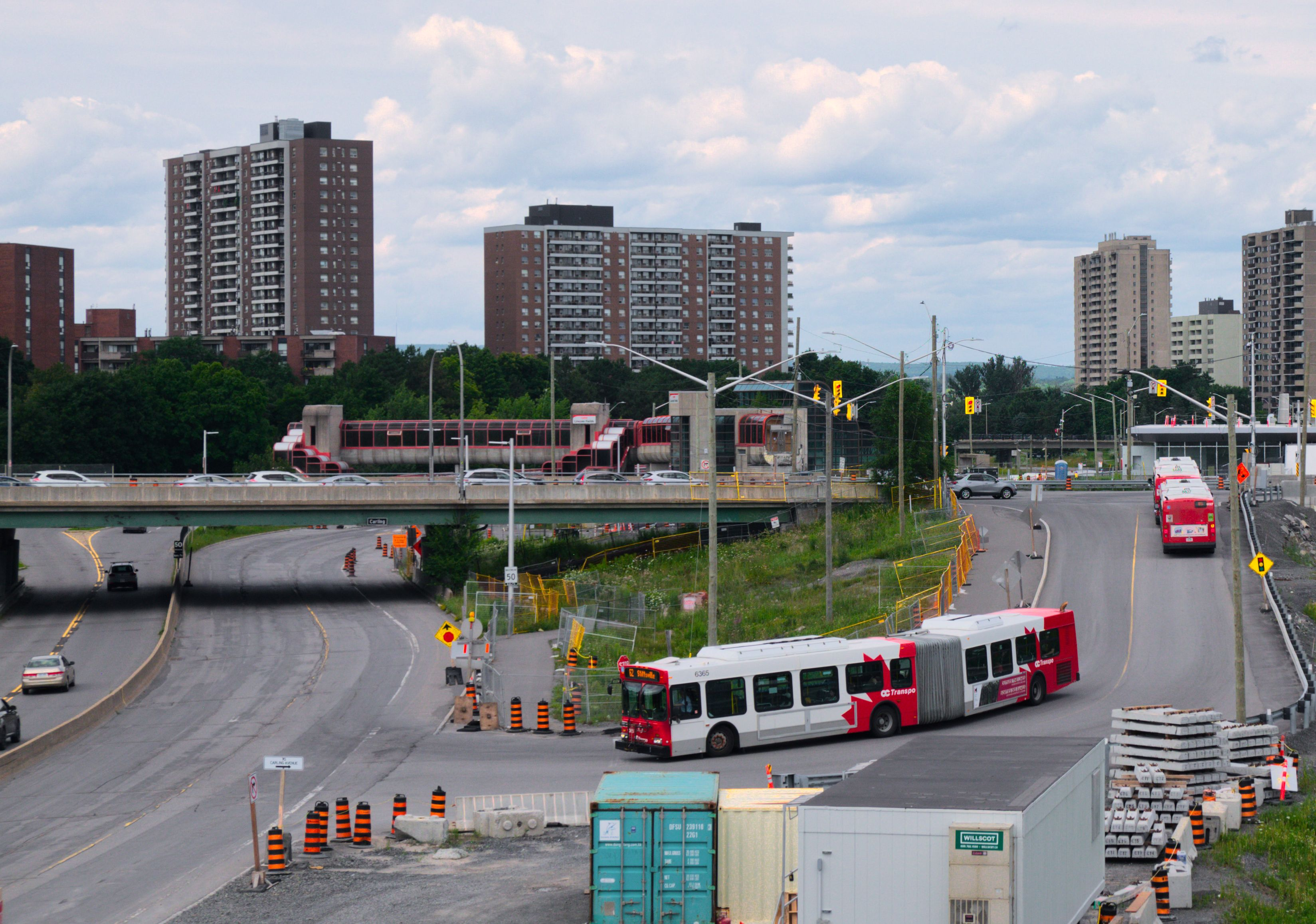
Articulated bus in Ottawa entering the Transitway trench using a ramp.

Most of the Ottawa Transitway is grade separated from other modes of traffic, using trenches and elevated structures to bypass intersections. These parts of the Transitway have access controlled to only allow buses, and are accessed from side streets using ramps. Being controlled access, they have high top speeds of up to 90km/h.

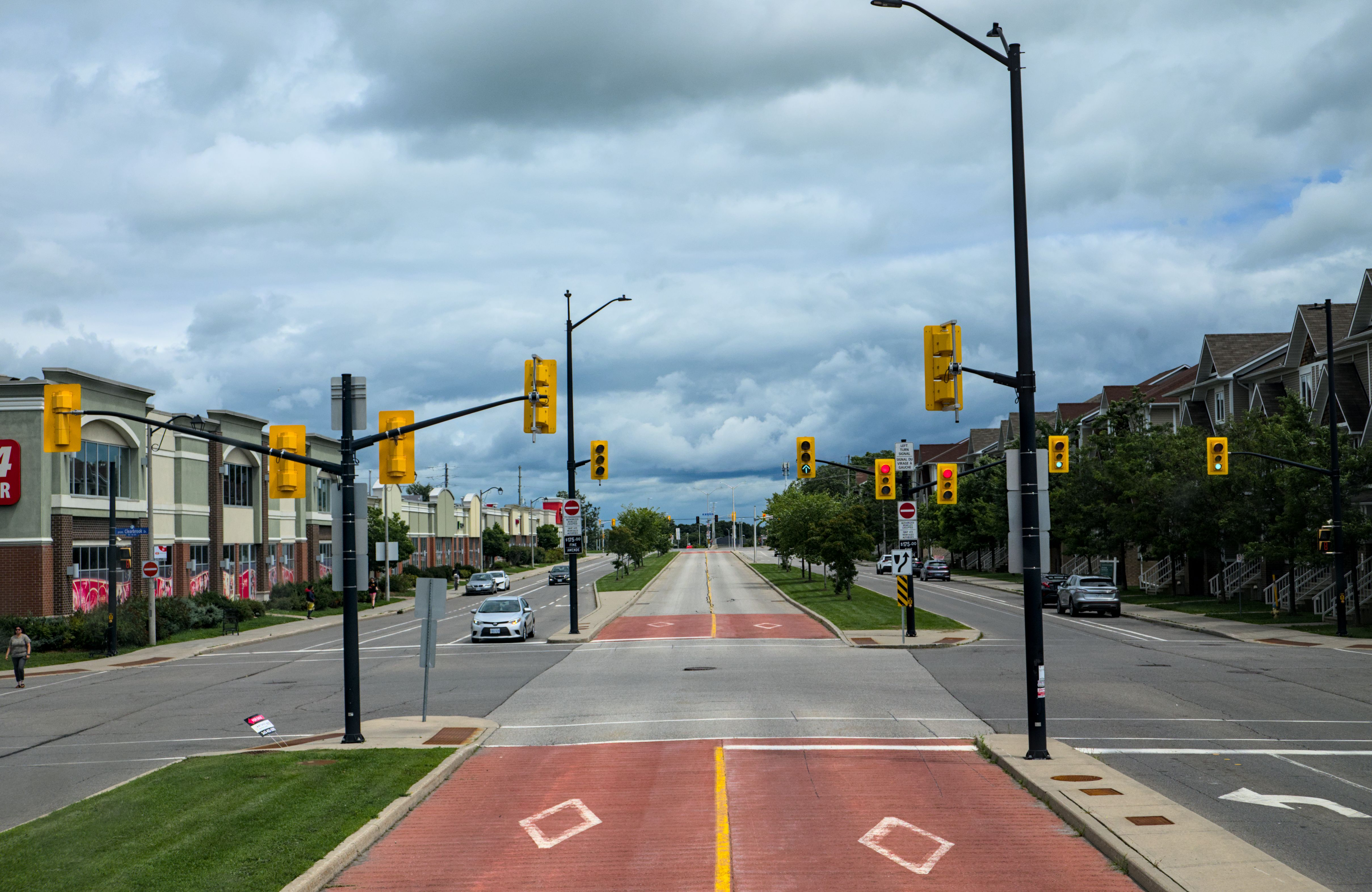
At-grade Transitway in Barrhaven

Other parts of the Transitway are at-grade, with signal priority given to buses at intersections. The city also has a large network of bus lanes on major roads, such as Highway 417 and Baseline Road, but it usually doesn't consider these a part of the rapid transit network.

All vehicles in Ottawa's bus fleet have on-board audio announcements and digital wayfinding. This is typically used to announce next stops, as well as what interchanges and notable destinations are available at that stop.

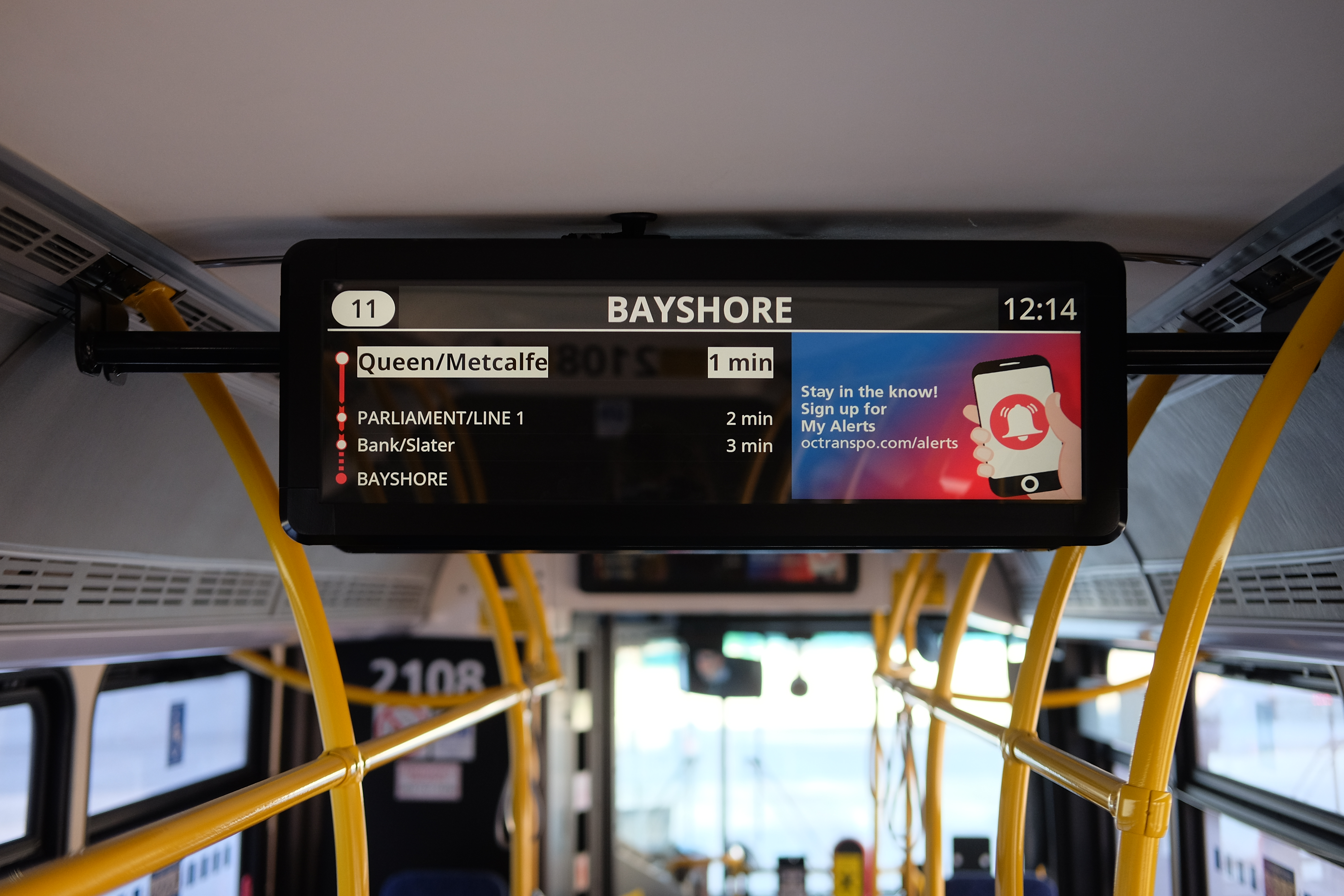
Digital wayfinding on new OC Transpo buses

=== Stations ===
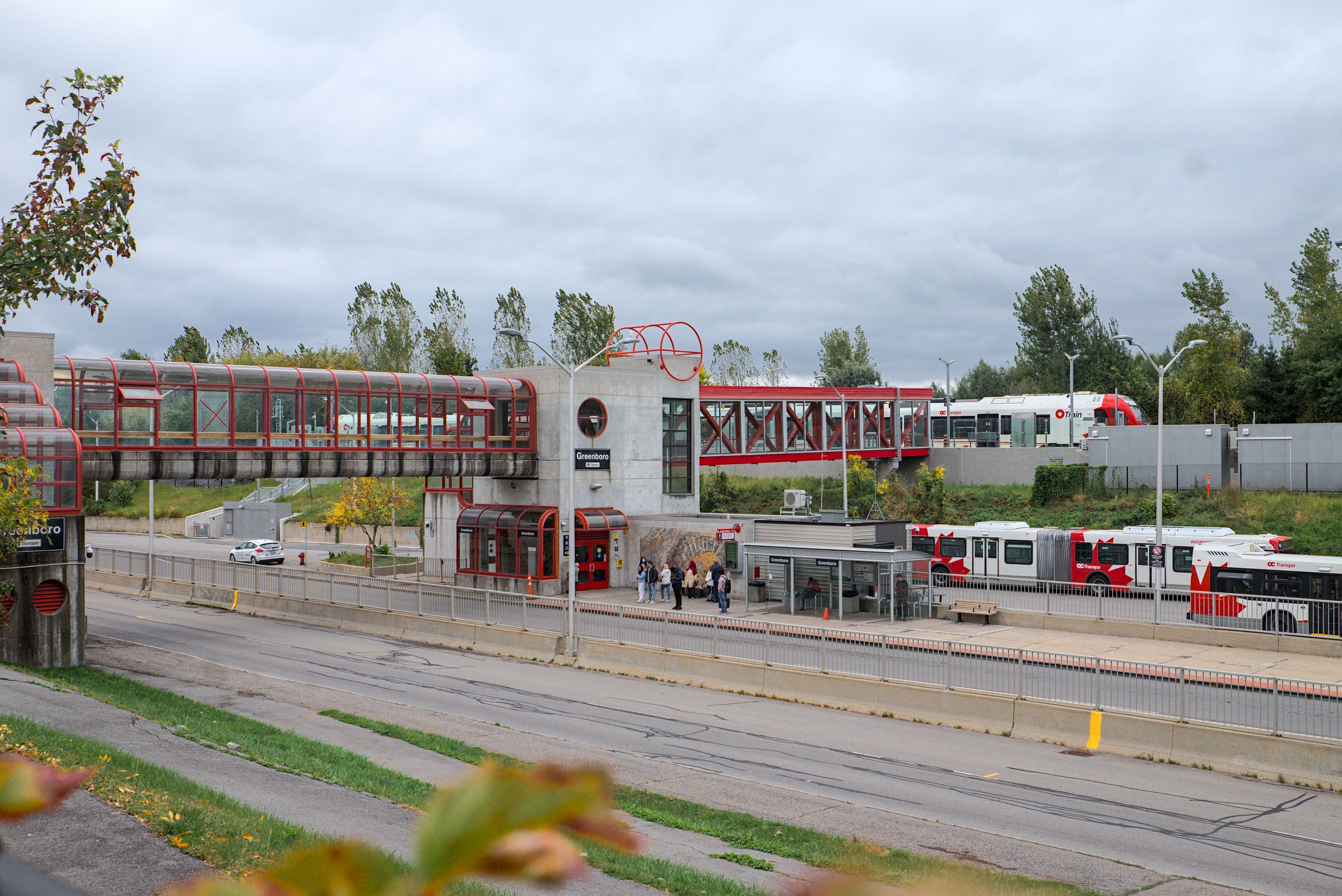
Greenboro station on the southeastern Transitway.

Stations on the Transitway typically have at least four lanes, two for buses stopping at the station, and two for vehicles travelling through the station. Almost all Transitway stations have shelters, and many Transitway stations have live departure boards, pedestrian bridges, and ticket machines. Older Transitway stations use modernist architecture, accented with red features.

== Legacy ==
The Transitway was the first bus rapid transit system of its kind in North America, and has had a significant impact on Ottawa, as well as cities across the world.

On the backs of the Transitway, Ottawa came to be seen as a gold standard for how to provide rapid transit cost effectively, and grew to champion one of the largest public transit mode shares in North America. Locally, the Transitway has come to form the backbone of the city's entire multi-modal transportation system, contributing to reducing congestion on the road network, making more of the city accessible to active transportation, and is the catalyst that enabled the current O-Train network. Abroad, the Transitway has created a perception of Ottawa as a "transit success story" in a continent otherwise resistant to taking transit, and is seen as a model for other cities internationally, especially within the United States.

== History ==
During the 1970s and 1980s, the Regional Municipality of Ottawa-Carleton approved the construction of a new transit corridor called the Transitway. The purpose of this busway was to increase the speed of city-bound services from east and west. The first two sections opened in 1983: the southwestern Transitway between Lincoln Fields and Baseline and the east between Lees and Hurdman.

The central Transitway was then added in the Westboro and Mechanicsville areas. In the downtown core, buses traveled along dedicated lanes on Albert and Slater streets. The eastern Transitway was extended in both directions, towards Laurier in the northwest and Blair in the east. These segments of the Transitway were serviced by route 95, travelling the full length of the Transitway from Baseline to Blair. Priority measures were later added to Woodroffe Avenue and Regional Road 174, extending service into the suburbs of Barrhaven and Orleans.

In the 1990s, a rail corridor was gradually converted into the southeast Transitway, spanning from Hurdman to South Keys. This new section necessitated the creation of route 97. Route 97 followed the new southeast Transitway before joining route 95 along the existing Transitway segments. The 97 was extended to service the suburb of Kanata. The Kanata section was later split off into route 96.

In 2001, the O-Train's Trillium Line (then simply the "O-Train") opened. Its northern terminus was at the new Bayview station on the central Transitway and its southern terminus at Greenboro on the southeast Transitway.

The southwest Transitway was gradually extended southward, first to Fallowfield in 2005 and then to Barrhaven Centre in 2011. A median busway section was added along Chapman Mills Drive to Nepean Woods in 2014. The first segment of the western Transitway opened in 2009 connecting Pinecrest and Bayshore. This was extended to Moodie in 2017.

Beginning in 2015, sections of the Transitway closed for conversion to light rail for the Confederation Line. Buses were rerouted to bus-only lanes along Highway 417, Regional Road 174, and city streets. The Confederation Line opened in 2019, along with a major re-organization of the Transitway network. Rapid routes no longer travelled through downtown Ottawa. Instead, all rapid routes use the Transitway to connect communities to the Confederation Line at one of three stations: Tunney's Pasture, Hurdman, or Blair. Routes were also renumbered to correspond with their geographic service area, resulting in the retirement of route 95, the Transitway's busiest and oldest route.

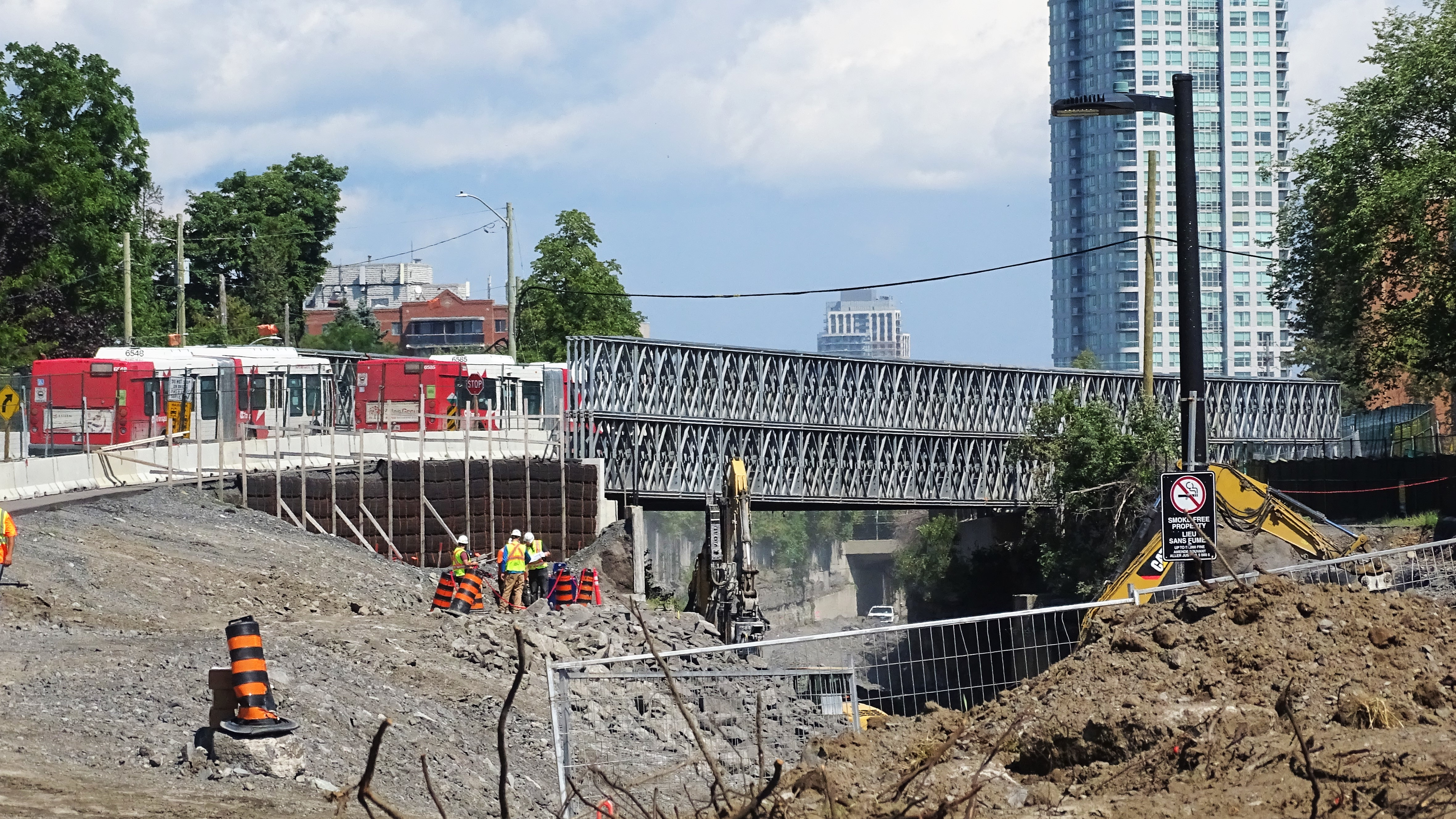
Temporary Transitway bridge connecting Scott Street to Dominion Station

Multiple sections of the Transitway were permanently closed for O-Train Stage 2 construction in 2021 and 2022. In September of 2021, the Transitway was closed between Moodie and Bayshore, followed by the section between Bayshore and Pinecrest in April of 2022. Buses were detoured along Highway 417, with Moodie station being relocated to temporary bus stops at the interchange ramps, and some bus routes bypassing Pinecrest and Bayshore stations eastbound as a result. In June, the entirety of the central Transitway between Tunney's Pasture and Dominion stations was closed, as well as the southwest Transitway between Iris and Baseline. Buses were detoured along Scott Street parallel to the former central Transitway, with a temporary extension and bridge connecting to Dominion Station. Buses were routed along Iris Street and Woodroffe Avenue between Iris and Baseline stations.

== Routes ==
The following are OC Transpo's bus routes that travel along the Transitway with frequent service connecting communities to the O-Train. Additional OC Transpo routes also use segments of the Transitway.

#	Terminus	Terminus	Notes	Map
13	Gatineau	Tunney's Pasture	Frequent peak period service between Tunney's Pasture and Gatineau	
39	Millennium; 39 Trim; 39 Place d'Orléans	Blair; N39 Rideau	Overnight extension N39 terminates at Rideau	
45	Hospital / Hôpital	Hurdman; N45 Rideau	Serves the Ottawa Health Sciences Complex, including The Ottawa Hospital's General Campus and Rehabilitation Centre and the Children's Hospital of Eastern Ontario; Overnight extension N45 terminates at Rideau	
57	Carling Campus	Tunney's Pasture; N57 Rideau	In September of 2025, Routes 57 and 58 will operate on a combined frequency between Tunney's Pasture and Bayshore station with certain portions operating every 30 minutes.; Overnight extension N57 terminates at Rideau	
58	Carling Campus; 58 Carling Campus to/vers Abbott Point of Care	Tunney's Pasture; 58 Bayshore	Most trips start/end at the Department of National Defense Carling Campus. Some weekday trips are extended to the Abbot Point of Care building near Moodie station during peak periods. In September of 2025, Routes 57 and 58 will operate on a combined frequency between Tunney's Pasture and Bayshore station with certain portions operating every 30 minutes.	
61	Stittsville; 61 Terry Fox	Tunney's Pasture; N61 Rideau	Early morning trips travel via Pinecrest Garage on Queensview; Overnight extension N61 terminates at Rideau; Serves Pimisi on Canada Day for customers with accessibility needs.	
62	Stittsville; 62 Terry Fox	Tunney's Pasture	Before noon on weekdays, eastbound buses travel via Fringewood between Abbott E. and Hazeldean, while westbound buses travel via Iber; After noon on weekdays, buses follow the reverse direction on both roads	
63	Briarbrook via Innovation	Tunney's Pasture via Briarbrook; N63 Rideau	Eastbound AM peak period trips travel via March instead of the business park; the reverse occurs in the PM peak for westbound; Overnight extension N63 terminates at Rideau	
74	Limebank	Tunney's Pasture	Select late evening northbound trips terminate at Fallowfield.	
75	Barrhaven Centre; Cambrian	Tunney's Pasture; N75 Rideau	Overnight extension N75 terminates at Rideau	
98	Hawthorne	Hurdman	Overnight extension N98 runs between Airport and Rideau Stations.	
99	Barrhaven Centre; 99 Weybridge (signed as Barrhaven Centre via Weybridge); 99 E.S. Pierre-de-Blois; 99 Riverview	Limebank; 99 St. Francis Xavier High School	Select trips extended from Barrhaven Centre to Weybridge. Select school trips serve St. Francis Xavier High School, trips serving St. Francis Xavier High School terminate at Riverview station even though most trips do not serve Riverview station. Some school trips are extended to E.S. Pierre-de-Blois. These trips do not loop through Weybridge.	
105	Airport	St-Laurent; N105 Rideau	New 24 hour bus route traveling along the Transitway between the Airport and St. Laurent stations.	
110	Innovation; 110 CitiGate	Limebank; 110 CitiGate; 110 Hurdman; 110 Earl of March	Serves the Amazon fullfilment Centre in Barrhaven. Select early morning trips which operate before the start of O-Train Line 2 service travel between CitiGate and Hurdman and serve Bowesville, Leitrim, South Keys, Greenboro, Walkley, Heron, Billings Bridge, Pleasant Park, Smyth and Lycee Claudel stations. School trips serving Earl of March Secondary School travel between Teron and Innovation stations only.	

== Stations and segments ==
=== East ===
Station	Connections	Notes
Blair	39	Bus terminal; Park & Ride
Montréal	39	Curbside
Jeanne d'Arc	39	Curbside; Park & Ride
Place d'Orléans	39	Bus terminal; Park & Ride
Trim	39	Curbside; Park & Ride
Millennium	39	Bus terminal; Park & Ride

The east Transitway currently consists of a series of intermittent bus-only lanes along Regional Road 174 between Blair and Place d'Orléans. It will be replaced by an east extension of Line 1 when it opens in 2026.

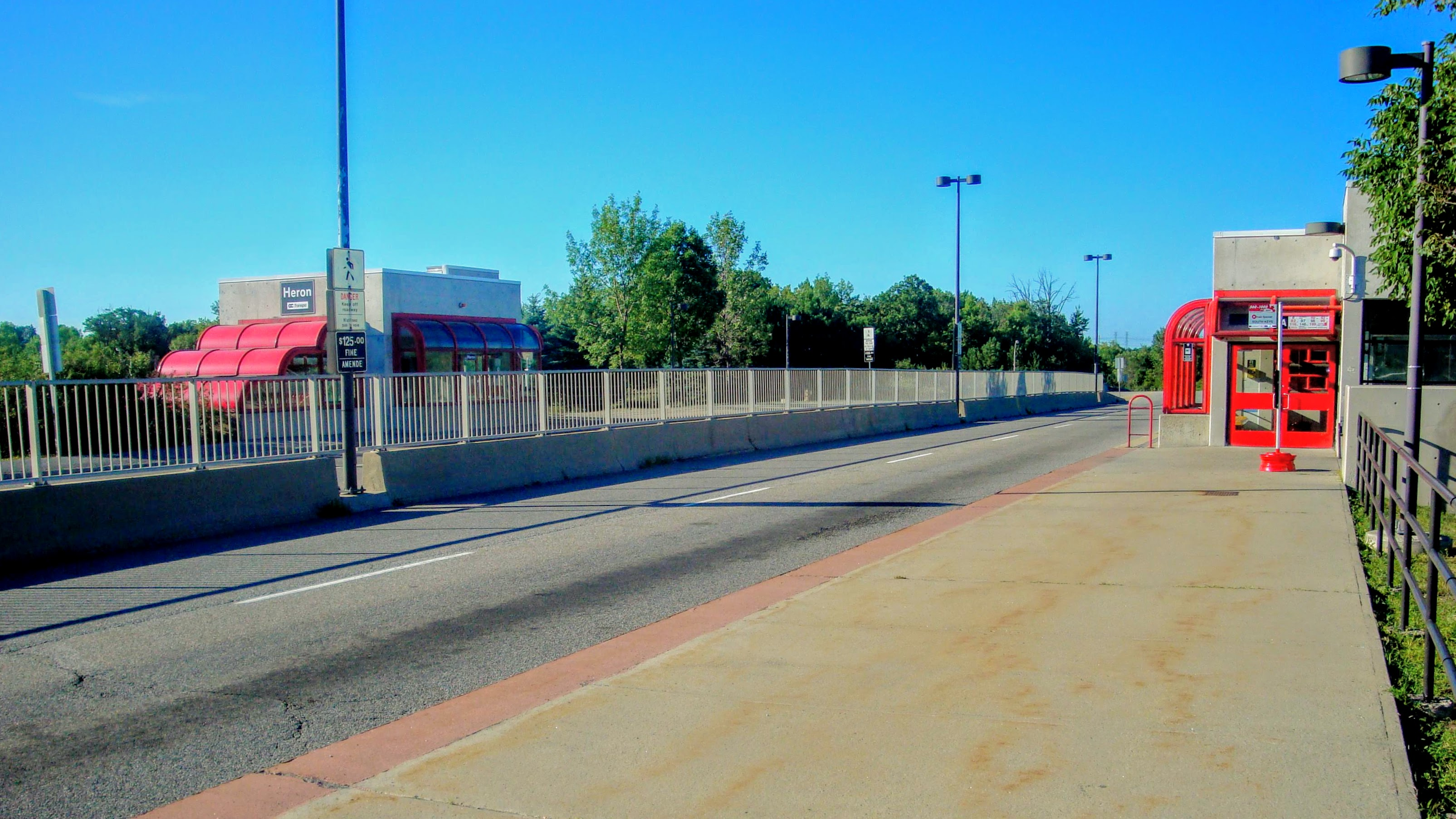
Heron station along southeast Transitway

=== Southeast ===
Station	Connections	Notes
Hurdman	45 98 105	Bus terminal
Lycée Claudel	45 98 105	Busway
Smyth	98 105	Busway
Riverside	98 105	Busway
Pleasant Park	98 105	Busway
Billings Bridge	98 105	Busway
Heron	98 105	Busway
Walkley	98 105	Busway
Greenboro	98 105	Busway; Park & Ride
South Keys	98 105	Busway
Leitrim	93 94	Bus terminal; Park & Ride
Airport	105	Curbside
Hawthorne	98	Curbside

The southeast Transitway is a dedicated busway adjacent to some rail corridors between Hurdman and South Keys.

=== Central ===
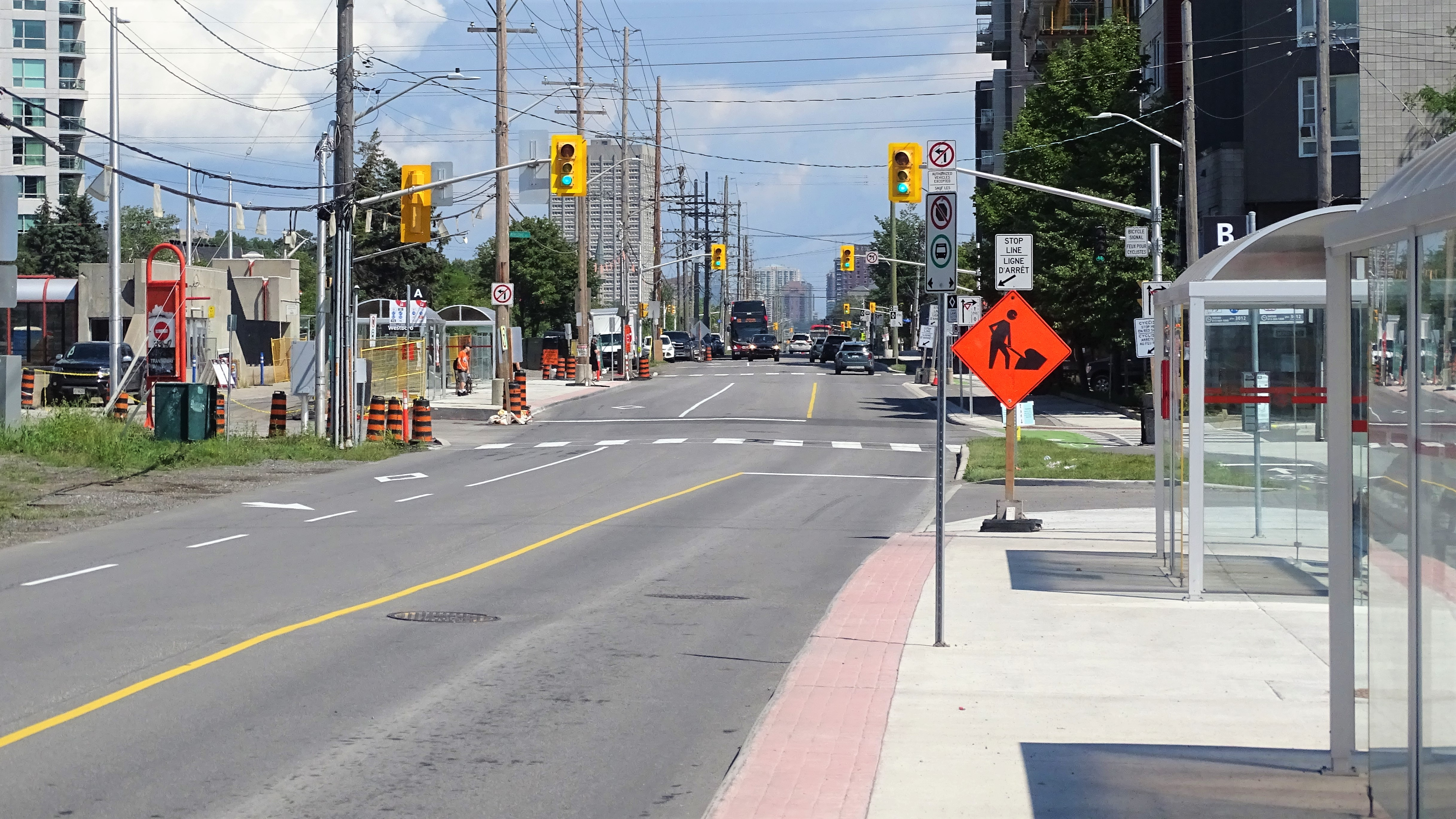
Westboro Station relocated to Scott Street following the closure of the central Transitway

Station	Connections	Notes
Pimisi	13	Curbside
Bayview	13	Curbside
Tunney's Pasture	13 57 58 61 62 63 74 75	Bus terminal
Westboro	57 58 61 62 63 74 75	Curbside
Dominion	57 58 61 62 63 74 75	Busway

The central Transitway was a dedicated busway between Pimisi (formerly LeBreton) and Dominion stations. The Pimisi to Bayview segment was closed in January 2016 for O-Train Stage 1 construction and the Bayview to Tunney's Pasture segment was closed in June 2016. In June 2022, the remaining segment of the central transitway west of Tunney's Pasture was closed for O-Train Stage 2 construction, with buses now running along dedicated bus lanes on Scott Street. A temporary Transitway was built from Dominion station to the intersection of Churchill Road and Scott Street. The new Transitway travels over the old one via the bailey bridge and then alongside until the intersection of Scott / Churchill. Route 12 serves central transitway stations between Rideau and Tunney's Pasture including Parliament and Lyon stations.

=== Downtown ===
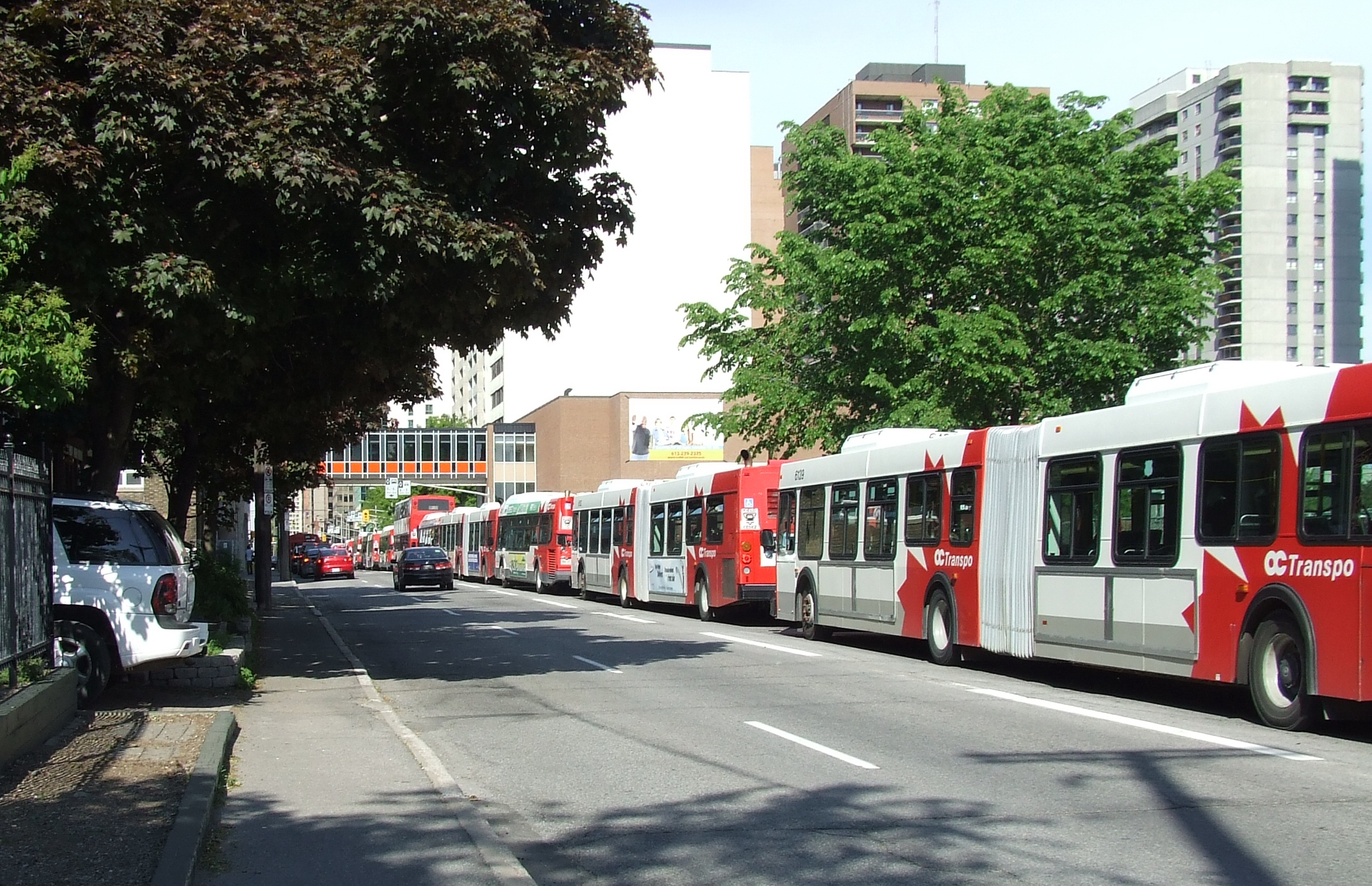
Bus congestion on the former downtown Transitway

The former downtown section of the Transitway consisted of two single bus-only lanes on Albert and Slater Streets (one-way public streets in opposite westbound and eastbound directions, respectively), with stops in each direction at Bay, Kent, Bank and Metcalfe Streets as well as on the Mackenzie King Bridge. Traffic congestion here, where the buses mingle with private vehicles, often caused service delays and was seen by some as the main weakness in the Transitway system.

Initial plans for the Transitway included a bus-only tunnel in this section but the cost of a ventilated tunnel for conventional buses was deemed too expensive and was not warranted at the time. In 2006, it was proposed to extend the O-Train downtown as a tramway over the same streets while keeping existing bus and car traffic. The idea was met with objections from businesses along those streets, as normal access to the businesses would be impeded.

In 2019, the Confederation Line opened, replacing the downtown portion of the Transitway with an underground, high-capacity rapid transit rail line. This service change greatly reduced the number of buses travelling on Albert and Slater streets.

=== Greenboro Busway ===
This former section of Transitway was a two lane bus-only corridor between Cahill and Lorry Greenberg Drives in the Greenboro neighbourhood in south Ottawa. Part of a planned neighbourhood in 1984, it opened in 1987 while the neighbourhood was still being developed. It was opened as a corridor with no stations, as it was planned to extend to Conroy Road once the neighbourhood was completed. It ran mostly without issue, servicing two routes and providing service during regular and peak periods.

As time went on, the planned neighbourhood's density was heavily reduced due to heavy backlash from the local community using the slogan “buses out of backyards”. By 1989, OC Transpo began phasing out the corridor, and by 1990 it was declared surplus lands. On September 2, 1995, OC Transpo ran its final bus on the corridor, and it was then gated up and left abandoned for the next 7 years. After being sold to the city, it was officially fully removed by 2002.

=== Southwest ===
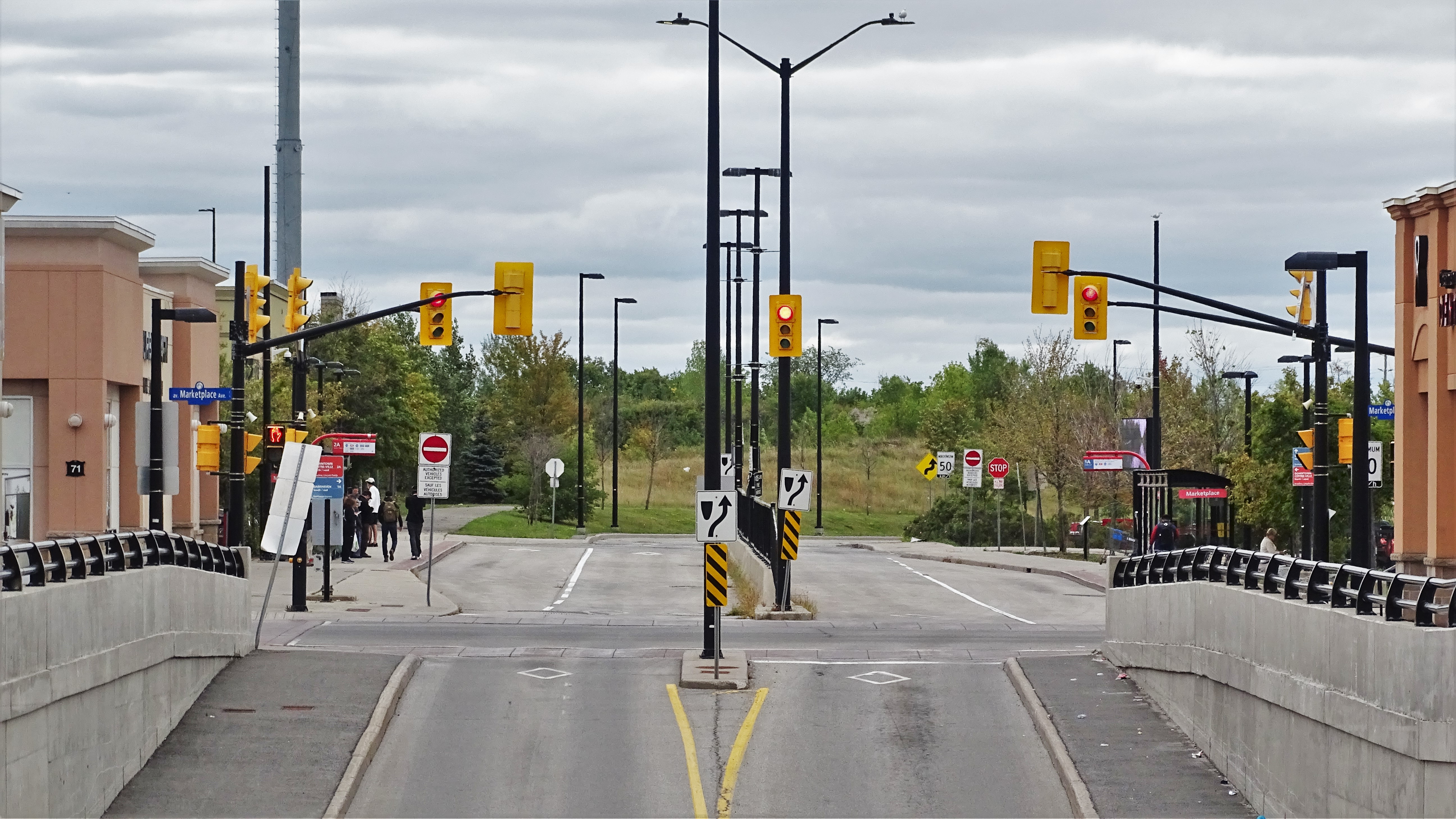
Marketplace station along southwest Transitway

Station	Connections	Notes
Lincoln Fields	57 58 61 62 63 74 75	Bus terminal
Queensway	61 62 63 74 75	Busway; Will be retired and turned into a multi-use pathway
Iris	74 75	Busway
Baseline	74 75	Bus terminal; Park & Ride; Located across from Algonquin College; Will be renamed to Algonquin once O-Train Line 1 is extended here.
Fallowfield	74 75	Busway; Park & Ride; Connection to Via Rail services
Longfields	75	Busway
Strandherd	75	Busway; Park & Ride
Marketplace	75 99 110	Busway
Barrhaven Centre	75 99 110	Busway
Citigate	110	Curbside; Located across from Amazon's YOW3 facility on Citigate Drive
Cambrian	75	Curbside
Beatrice	99 110	Busway
Nepean Woods	74 99 110	Busway; Park & Ride
Riverview	74 110	Bus terminal; Park & Ride
Limebank	74 99 110	Bus terminal

The southwest Transitway includes a dedicated busway from Lincoln Fields to Baseline. Buses then travel on reserved lanes before joining a busway before Fallowfield. This busway extends from Fallowfield to Barrhaven Centre. A separate median busway east of Marketplace connects Beatrice and Nepean Woods before traveling along reserved lanes to Riverview. There are plans to extend the transitway to Limebank. Route 110 offers station to station service between Limebank and CitiGate.

=== West ===
Station	Connections	Notes
Pinecrest	61 62 63	Busway
Bayshore	57 58 61 62 63	Bus terminal
Moodie	57 61 62 63	Busway
Bells Corners	57	Curbside
Eagleson	61 62 63 110	Bus terminal; Park & Ride
Terry Fox	61 62	Bus terminal; Park & Ride
Canadian Tire Centre	162	Bus terminal; Park & Ride
Stittsville	61 62	Curbside
Teron	62 63 110	Curbside
Innovation	63 110	Bus terminal; Park & Ride

The west Transitway consisted of a dedicated busway between Pinecrest and Moodie, however the section between Moodie and Bayshore closed permanently in September 2021, followed by the section between Bayshore and Pinecrest in April 2022. Buses also use reserved lanes on Highway 417 between Moodie and Eagleson.

== See also ==
- O-Train, OC Transpo's light rail transit system

Other bus rapid transit systems in Ontario

- Viva Rapid Transit
- Mississauga Transitway
- York University Busway
