= Limebank station =

Railway station in Ottawa, Ontario, Canada

Limebank
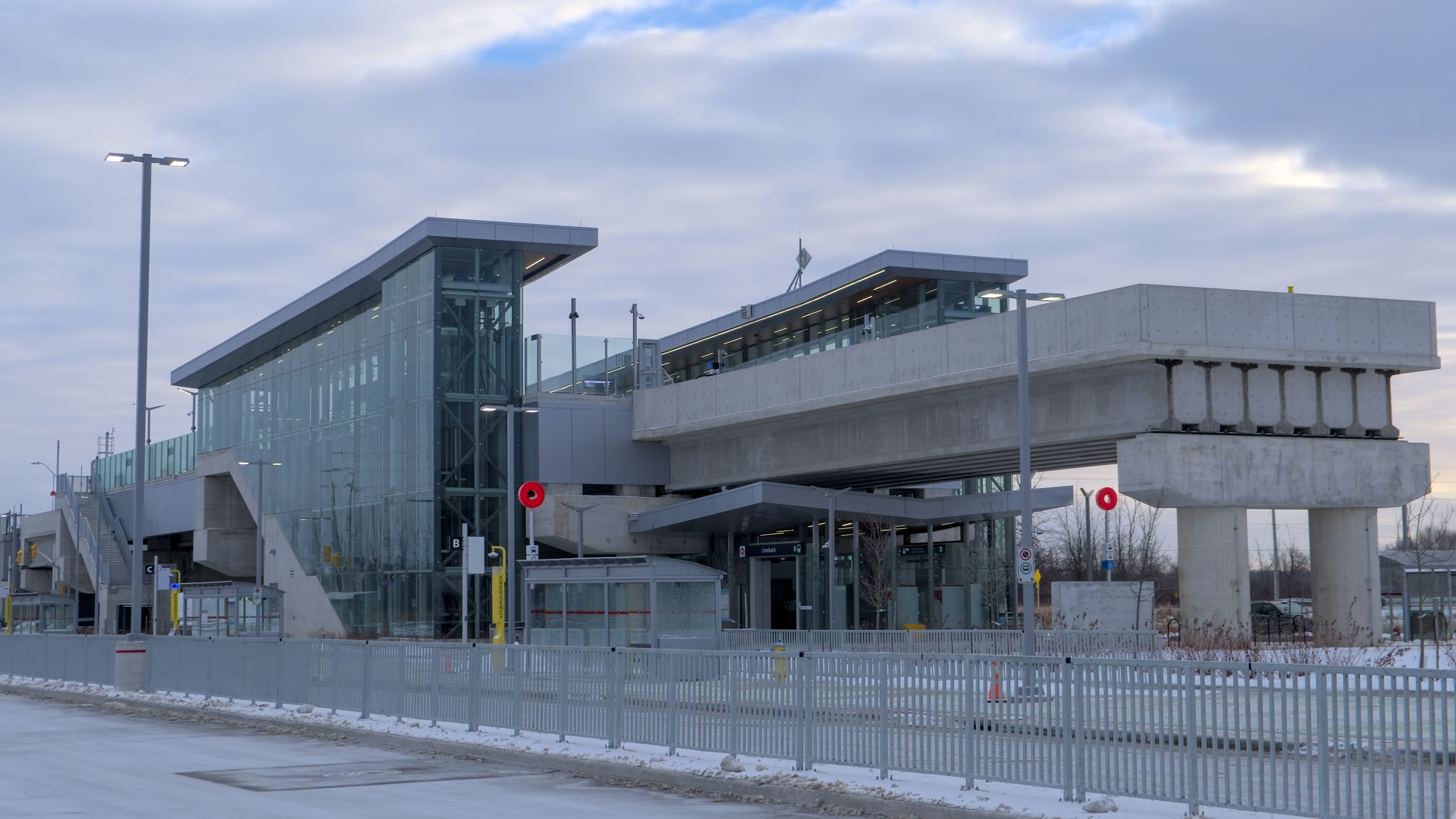
- Limebank station, shown from the north side

General information
- Coordinates: 45°16′35″N 75°40′06″W
- Owner: OC Transpo
- Platforms: Side platforms
- Tracks: 2

Construction
- Structure type: Elevated
- Cycle facilities: 40 parking spaces, sheltered
- Accessible: Yes

Other information
- Station code: 3068

History
- Opened: January 6, 2025

Services
Preceding station	OC Transpo	Following station
Bowesville toward Bayview	Line 2	Terminus
Terminus	Route 74	Riverview toward Tunney's Pasture
Nepean Woods toward Barrhaven Centre	Route 99	Terminus
Riverview toward Innovation	Route 110	Terminus
Former services
Preceding station	OC Transpo	Following station
Riverview toward Barrhaven Centre	Route 99 Truncated April 2025	Leitrim toward Hurdman
Location

Limebank is a terminal station on Line 2 in Ottawa, Ontario. The station is elevated with two side platforms and is located southwest of the intersection of Limebank and Earl Armstrong roads. OC Transpo routes 73, 74, 99, 110, 198, 283 and 299 connect to this station as of April 27, 2025. When revenue service began January 6, 2025, bus routes 74, 278, 99 (after 7 days service began) and 198 connected to this station.

This station serves the Riverside South community within an expansive area zoned for commercial and retail purposes. As with the Bayview terminus station, it features a public washroom. With the Line 2 expansion operational, OC Transpo Route 73 and 74 have been extended east from Nepean Woods station and Leikin station along Strandherd and Earl Armstrong, with a stop at Riverview station, before ending at Limebank station. Route 99 has also been shortened with its eastern terminus being moved to Limebank station. Route 99 service east of Limebank station was replaced by Line 2. Route 283 which used to serve Tunney's Pasture now terminates at Limebank station and follows a different alignment between Limebank and Richmond.

As of May 2023, under the City of Ottawa's Transportation Master Plan (TMP), the undeveloped-yet-protected transit corridor linking Limebank station with Riverview station and the park-and-ride to the west is slated to be used for a bus rapid transit (BRT) corridor. Despite this, there were growing local calls to zone this corridor for a future Line 2 LRT extension in the next version TMP, which was due to be published in late 2023 or early 2024.

== Service ==
The following routes service Limebank station:

Stop	Routes
North O-Train	Line 2 (O-Train)
A	198 283 299
B	
C	105 110
D	R2 406
E	
F	99 110 693
G	73
H	74
I	70

== Notes ==
- Route 110 serves stop C and is extended to Hurdman station during the early morning when O-Train Line 2 is not running. Between Limebank and Hurdman stations, it serves Bowesville, Leitrim, South Keys, Greenboro, Walkley, Heron, Billings Bridge, Pleasant Park, Riverside, Smyth and Lycée Claudel stations.
