= Barrhaven Centre station =

Barrhaven Centre
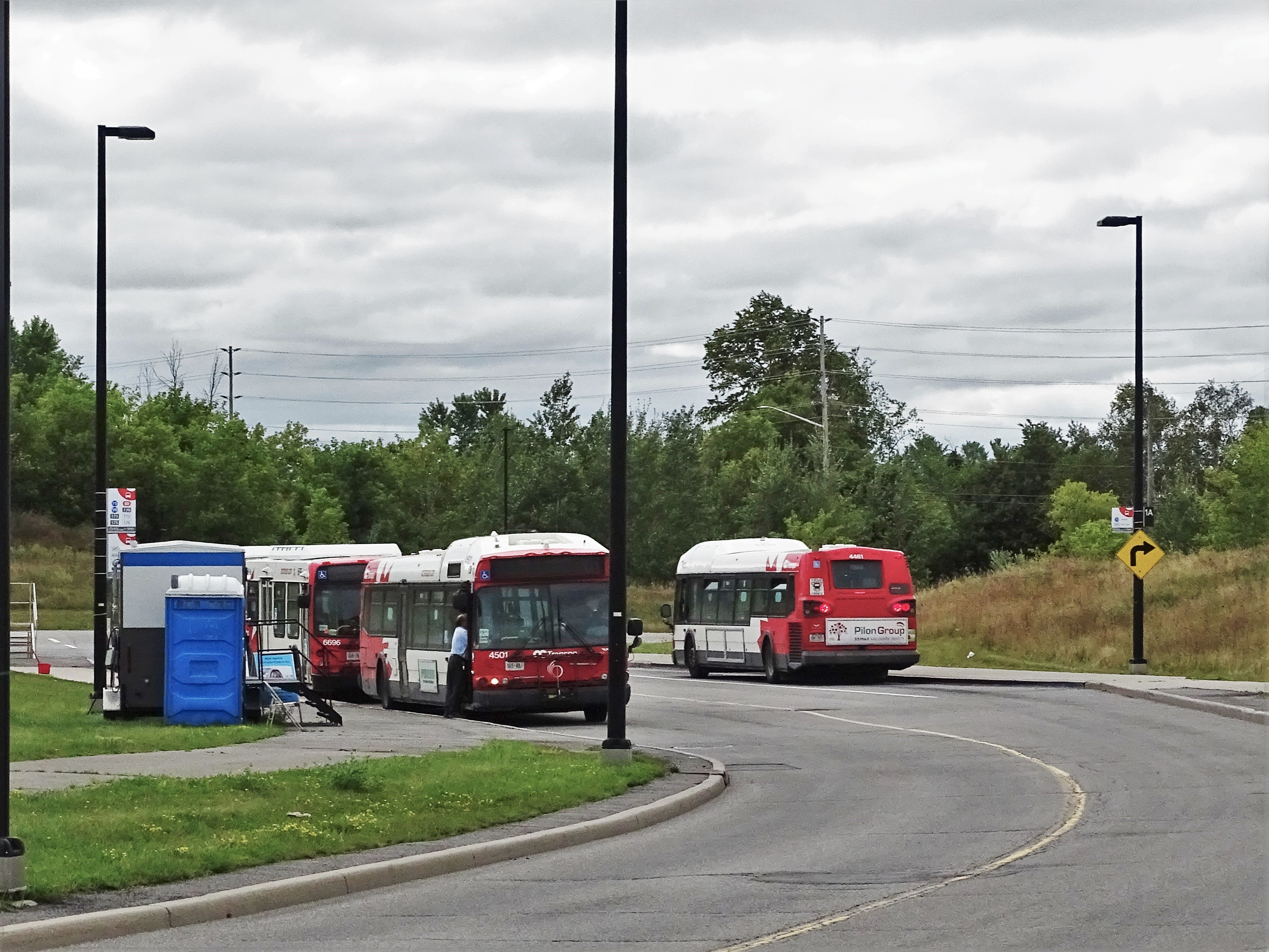

General information
- Location: Jockvale Road, Barrhaven
- Coordinates: 45°15′58″N 75°44′33″W
- Owner: OC Transpo

History
- Opened: April 17, 2011

Services
Preceding station	OC Transpo	Following station
Cambrian Terminus	Route 75	Marketplace toward Tunney's Pasture
Weybridge One-way operation	Route 99	Marketplace toward Limebank
CitiGate toward Innovation	Route 110	Marketplace toward Limebank
Former services
Preceding station	OC Transpo	Following station
Terminus	Route 99 Truncated April 2025	Marketplace toward Hurdman
Citigate Limited service Terminus	Route 99 Truncated April 2025	Marketplace toward Hurdman
Systemhouse Limited service One-way operation	Route 99 Truncated April 2025	Marketplace toward Hurdman
Location

Barrhaven Centre station is the southerly terminus of the Southwest Transitway in the Barrhaven neighbourhood of Ottawa, Ontario, Canada. It is the main western terminus of rapid route 75 for trips not coming from or heading to Cambrian, as well as local route 99 trips not looping around Jockvale/Weybridge. Local route 110 which travels between Limebank and Innovation continues through this station in both directions.

As part of the Stage 3 O-Train expansion to Barrhaven and Kanata, this station will be converted to light rail and will become the new western terminus for Line 1.

== Service ==
The following routes serve Barrhaven Centre station as of April 27, 2025:

Key
Line 1 (O-Train) Line 2 (O-Train) Line 4 (O-Train)	O-Train
E1	Shuttle Express
R1 R2 R4	O-Train replacement bus routes
N75	Night routes
40 12	Frequent routes
99 162	Local routes
275	Connexion routes
303	Shopper routes
405	Event routes
646	School routes
STO	Société de transport de l'Outaouais routes
Additional info: Line 1: Confederation Line; Line 2: Trillium Line; Line 4: Airport Link; Routes 5 to 199: Custom routing that that connects to Line 1 and/or 2; Routes 200 to 299: Connexion (peak-period only routes that connect to the O-Train); Routes 301 to 305: Shopper Routes (limited rural service); Routes 404 to 406: Canadian Tire Centre events; Routes 450 to 456: Lansdowne Park events; Routes 600 to 699: School Routes; Route R1: replaces Line 1 when it is out of service; Route R2: replaces Line 2 when it is out of service; Route R4: replaces Line 4 when it is out of service; Routes N39 to N98: night service (replaces Line 1 and N98 replaces Line 4); White backgrounds: limited service; Last two digits represent service area: 00s and 10s – Central; 20s – Gloucester; 30s – Orléans; 40s – Ottawa East; 50s – Ottawa West; 60s – Kanata, Stittsville; 70s – Barrhaven; 80s – Nepean; 90s – South Keys

Stop	Routes
1A Local South	70 75 99 110 275 279 305 671 677 683 690
2A Transitway North	70 75 80 99 110 173 275 279 305 406 456 671 677 683
