= List of O-Train stations =

Map of existing and under-construction O-Train system

The O-Train is a light rail system in Ottawa, Ontario, Canada operated by OC Transpo consisting of three lines and 25 stations, all fully grade-separated. Line 1 is an electric light metro line and consists of 13 stations, 4 of which are underground. It runs east-west across the city, a distance of approximately 12.5 kilometres (8 mi) from Tunney's Pasture to Blair. Line 2 is a fully grade-separated diesel light rail line and consists of 11 stations. The present line runs north-south on a railway line, from Bayview to Limebank, a distance of approximately 19 kilometres (12 mi) and consists of 11 stations. It is isolated from road traffic, but shared with other trains; after operating hours the track has been infrequently used by Ottawa Central for freight service to the National Research Council. Line 4 is a diesel light rail line splitting from Line 2 at South Keys and runs south to Ottawa Macdonald–Cartier International Airport, a distance of approximately 4 kilometres (2 mi).

Stage 2 will see the O-Train system expanded south, east, and west, with 16 new stations added to the existing lines.

== Stations ==
Line	Stations	Track	Ridership (Q2 2026 daily)
Line 1	13	12.5 km (7.8 mi)	89,500
Line 2	11	19 km (12 mi)	89,500
Line 4	3	4 km (2.5 mi)	89,500

Station	Line	Opened	Grade	Platforms	Transfers
Tunney's Pasture	Line 1 (O-Train)	2019	Trench	Side	Transitway; OC Transpo buses; STO buses
Bayview	Line 1 (O-Train) Line 2 (O-Train)	2019; 2001	Elevated; Underpass	Side	Transitway; OC Transpo buses
Pimisi	Line 1 (O-Train)	2019	Underpass	Centre	OC Transpo buses
Lyon	Line 1 (O-Train)	2019	Underground	Side	OC Transpo buses; STO buses
Parliament	Line 1 (O-Train)	2019	Underground	Side	OC Transpo buses; STO buses
Rideau	Line 1 (O-Train)	2019	Underground	Side	OC Transpo buses
uOttawa	Line 1 (O-Train)	2019	Surface	Side	None
Lees	Line 1 (O-Train)	2019	Trench	Side	OC Transpo buses
Hurdman	Line 1 (O-Train)	2019	Elevated	Side	Transitway; OC Transpo buses
Tremblay	Line 1 (O-Train)	2019	Trench	Side	Ottawa station
St-Laurent	Line 1 (O-Train)	2019	Underground	Side	OC Transpo buses
Cyrville	Line 1 (O-Train)	2019	Underpass	Centre	None
Blair	Line 1 (O-Train)	2019	Surface	Centre	Transitway; OC Transpo buses; Park and Ride
Dow's Lake	Line 2 (O-Train)	2001	Trench	Single	OC Transpo buses
Carleton	Line 2 (O-Train)	2001	Surface	Side	OC Transpo buses
Mooney's Bay	Line 2 (O-Train)	2001	Surface	Single	OC Transpo buses
Greenboro	Line 2 (O-Train)	2001	Surface	Single	Transitway; OC Transpo buses; Park and Ride
Corso Italia	Line 2 (O-Train)	2025	Trench	Side	OC Transpo buses
Walkley	Line 2 (O-Train)	2025	Underpass	Single	Transitway; OC Transpo buses
South Keys	Line 2 (O-Train) Line 4 (O-Train)	2025	Surface	Centre	Transitway; OC Transpo buses
Uplands	Line 4 (O-Train)	2025	Elevated	Side	None
Airport	Line 4 (O-Train)	2025	Elevated	Single	Ottawa Macdonald–Cartier International Airport
Leitrim	Line 2 (O-Train)	2025	Elevated	Side	OC Transpo buses; Park and Ride
Bowesville	Line 2 (O-Train)	2025	Elevated	Side	OC Transpo buses; Park and Ride
Limebank	Line 2 (O-Train)	2025	Elevated	Side	Transitway; OC Transpo buses

== Under construction ==
Stage 2 is a planned extension to the O-Train network which will add an additional 16 stations to Line 1 and 3.

Extension	Station	Line	Opening	Grade	Platforms	Transfers
Line 1/3 East	Trim	Line 1 (O-Train) Line 3 (O-Train)	2026	Surface	Centre	OC Transpo buses Park and Ride
Line 1/3 East	Place d'Orléans	Line 1 (O-Train) Line 3 (O-Train)	2026	Surface	Centre	OC Transpo buses
Line 1/3 East	Convent Glen	Line 1 (O-Train) Line 3 (O-Train)	2026	Surface	Centre	OC Transpo buses
Line 1/3 East	Jeanne d'Arc	Line 1 (O-Train) Line 3 (O-Train)	2026	Surface	Centre	OC Transpo buses
Line 1/3 East	Montréal	Line 1 (O-Train) Line 3 (O-Train)	2026	Elevated	Centre	OC Transpo buses
Line 1 West	Westboro	Line 1 (O-Train) Line 3 (O-Train)	2027	Trench	Side	OC Transpo buses
Line 1 West	Kichi Zìbì	Line 1 (O-Train) Line 3 (O-Train)	2027	Trench	Side	None
Line 1 West	Sherbourne	Line 1 (O-Train) Line 3 (O-Train)	2027	Underground	Centre	OC Transpo buses
Line 1 West	New Orchard	Line 1 (O-Train) Line 3 (O-Train)	2027	Underground	Centre	OC Transpo buses
Line 1 West	Lincoln Fields	Line 1 (O-Train) Line 3 (O-Train)	2027	Surface	Cross-platform interchange	OC Transpo buses
Line 1 West	Iris	Line 1 (O-Train)	2027	Surface	Side	OC Transpo buses
Line 1 West	Algonquin	Line 1 (O-Train)	2027	Underground	Centre	OC Transpo buses
Line 3 West	Queensview	Line 3 (O-Train)	2027	Trench	Side	OC Transpo buses
Line 3 West	Pinecrest	Line 3 (O-Train)	2027	Trench	Centre	OC Transpo buses
Line 3 West	Bayshore	Line 3 (O-Train)	2027	Surface	Side	OC Transpo buses
Line 3 West	Moodie	Line 3 (O-Train)	2027	Surface	Side	OC Transpo buses
