= South Keys Shopping Centre =

Strip mall in Ottawa, Ontario

Coordinates: 45.35624°N 75.6559°W

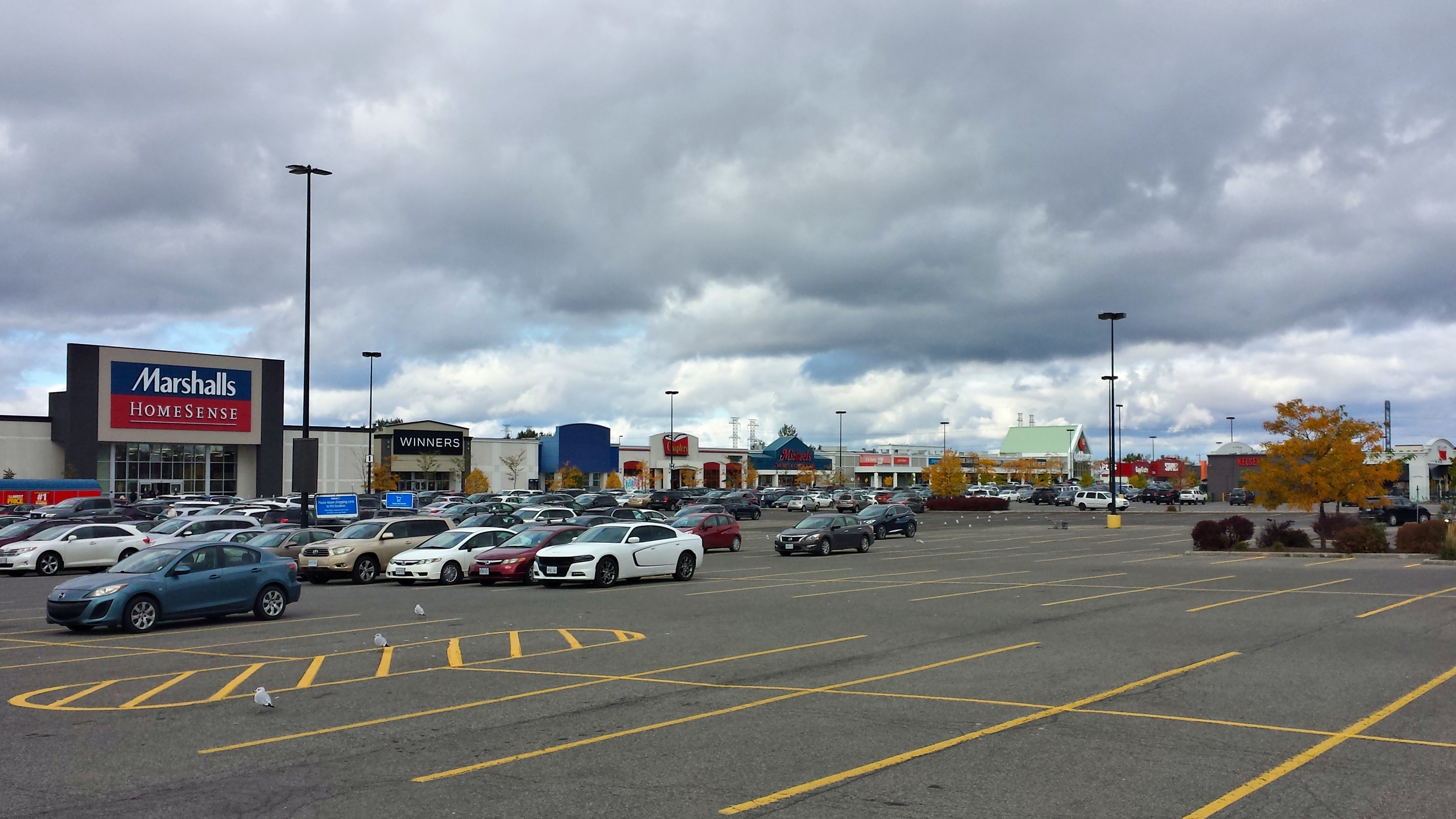
- Address: 2210 Bank Street; Ottawa, ON; K1V 1J5
- Opened: 1996
- Owner: SmartCentres
- Num. of stores: 20
- Num. of anchor tenants: 1
- Floor area: 486,127 sq ft (45,162.7 m^{2})
- Parking: 2,982
- Public transit: Greenboro; South Keys
- Website: SmartCentres Ottawa South

South Keys Shopping Centre, officially SmartCentres Ottawa South, is a shopping centre in the South Keys neighbourhood of Ottawa, Ontario, Canada. It is owned and operated by SmartCentres. The power centre is built on 56 acres of land with 486,127 square feet of store space. Walmart serves as the mall's anchor. Eight separate buildings house the centre's 20 stores and services which include supermarkets, restaurants, banks, and a movie theatre. South Keys Shopping Centre was first opened in 1996.

The property is bound by Johnston Road to the north, Bank Street to the east, Dazé Street to the south, and the Transitway to the west. SmartCentres notes that there are 50,638 households comprising 71,374 people within a 5km radius of the shopping centre. The average household income within this radius is CA$113,539.

OC Transpo's Transitway and O-Train run north-south along the back of the shopping centre with Greenboro station serving the mall's north end and South Keys station serving the south end. Greenboro station also features a park and ride.

The shopping centre has been the location of several minor and major crimes. At around 9:00 a.m. on July 28, 2013, the body of a deceased female was found in the ditch between the Kelsey's parking lot and Bank Street. The following day, she was identified as 28-year-old Melissa Richmond, who had been missing for the previous two weeks. It was Ottawa's seventh homicide of the year. On November 26, 2015, her husband, 53-year-old Howard Richmond, was found guilty of first degree murder. At around 6:30 p.m. on November 23, 2018, a 27-year-old man, Yonis Barkhadle, one of three brothers who were well known to police in the city, was fatally shot in the parking lot at the north end of the mall.

Since 2015, the City of Ottawa has been considering redeveloping South Keys Shopping Centre into a mixed-use area.
