= Greenboro station =

Railway station in Ottawa, Ontario, Canada

Greenboro
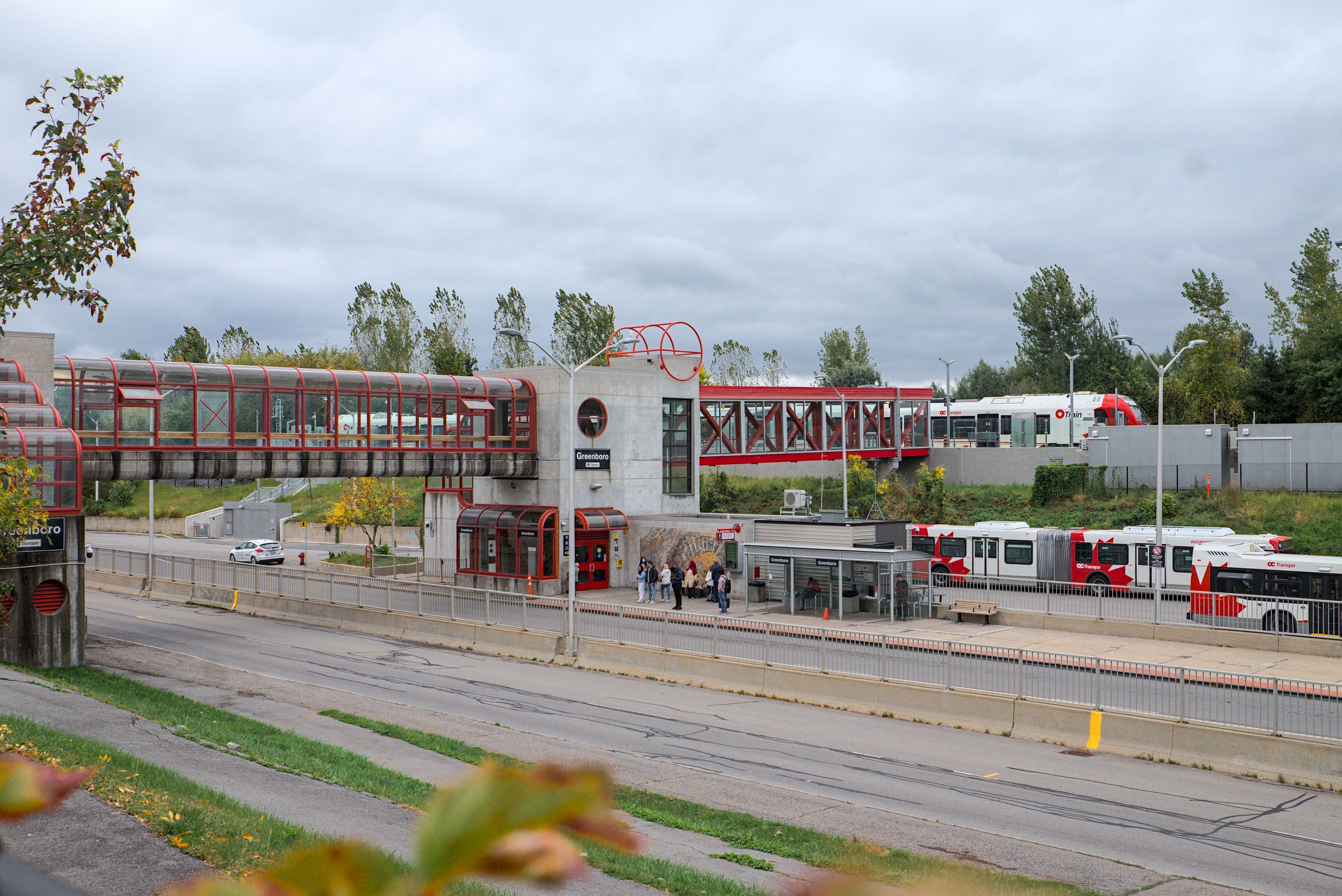
- Greenboro station in October 2024

General information
- Coordinates: 45°21′35″N 75°39′33″W
- Owner: OC Transpo
- Platforms: Side platform
- Tracks: 1

Construction
- Parking: 575 free spaces and 18 accessible spaces
- Cycle facilities: Yes
- Accessible: Yes

History
- Opened: 1995
- Rebuilt: 2001, 2020–2025

Services
Preceding station	OC Transpo	Following station
Walkley toward Bayview	Line 2	South Keys toward Limebank
South Keys toward Hawthorne	Route 98	Walkley toward Hurdman
South Keys toward Airport	Route 105	Walkley toward St-Laurent
Former services
Preceding station	OC Transpo	Following station
South Keys toward Airport	Route 97 Closed April 2025	Walkley toward Hurdman
South Keys toward Barrhaven Centre	Route 99 Truncated April 2025	Walkley toward Hurdman
Location

Greenboro station is a transitway stop and O-Train Line 2 (Trillium Line) station in Ottawa, Ontario, Canada. It is located at Bank Street and Johnston Road at the north end of the South Keys shopping complex. The station has a 575-space free park and ride lot, along with 15 paid "gold permit" spaces. The bus terminus was opened with the southern transitway on September 2, 1995.

From 2001 to 2020, Greenboro station served as the southern terminus for the Trillium Line. With the line's reopening on January 6, 2025, Greenboro station became a through station, while Limebank station serves as the line's new terminus. Service to Uplands (near the EY Centre) and Airport stations was relocated to the nearby South Keys station, which connects to these stations with a fare-paid interchange to Line 4 (Airport Link).

== Service ==
The following routes serve Greenboro station as of April 27, 2025:

Key
Line 1 (O-Train) Line 2 (O-Train) Line 4 (O-Train)	O-Train
E1	Shuttle Express
R1 R2 R4	O-Train replacement bus routes
N75	Night routes
40 12	Frequent routes
99 162	Local routes
275	Connexion routes
303	Shopper routes
405	Event routes
646	School routes
STO	Société de transport de l'Outaouais routes
Additional info: Line 1: Confederation Line; Line 2: Trillium Line; Line 4: Airport Link; Routes 5 to 199: Custom routing that that connects to Line 1 and/or 2; Routes 200 to 299: Connexion (peak-period only routes that connect to the O-Train); Routes 301 to 305: Shopper Routes (limited rural service); Routes 404 to 406: Canadian Tire Centre events; Routes 450 to 456: Lansdowne Park events; Routes 600 to 699: School Routes; Route R1: replaces Line 1 when it is out of service; Route R2: replaces Line 2 when it is out of service; Route R4: replaces Line 4 when it is out of service; Routes N39 to N98: night service (replaces Line 1 and N98 replaces Line 4); White backgrounds: limited service; Last two digits represent service area: 00s and 10s – Central; 20s – Gloucester; 30s – Orléans; 40s – Ottawa East; 50s – Ottawa West; 60s – Kanata, Stittsville; 70s – Barrhaven; 80s – Nepean; 90s – South Keys

Greenboro station service
North/South O-Train	Line 2 (O-Train)
A Transitway North	R2 90 92 98 105 110 304 452 697 698
B Transitway South	R2 6 40 43 90 92 98 105 110 116 117 197 198 294 304 617 640 644 649 697 698
C Off Only	

== Notes ==
- During the early morning before the beginning of O-Train Line 2 service hours, Route 110 is extended from Systemhouse/Pathway to Greenboro station. There is only two trips in the early morning on Saturdays, Sundays, and Mondays, and a single trip the rest of the weekdays.

== Gallery ==
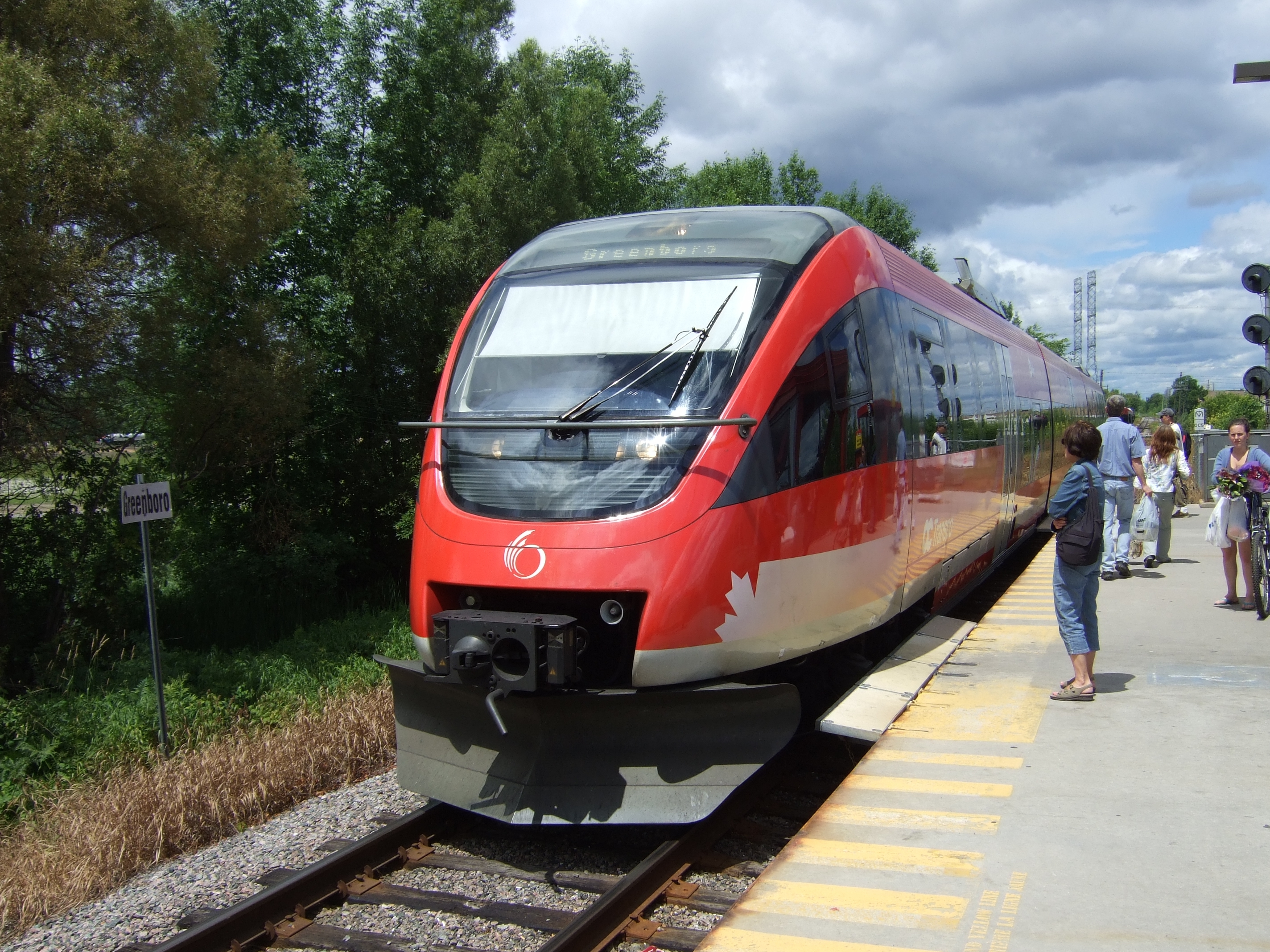
O-Train platform in 2005, with Bombardier Talent BR643

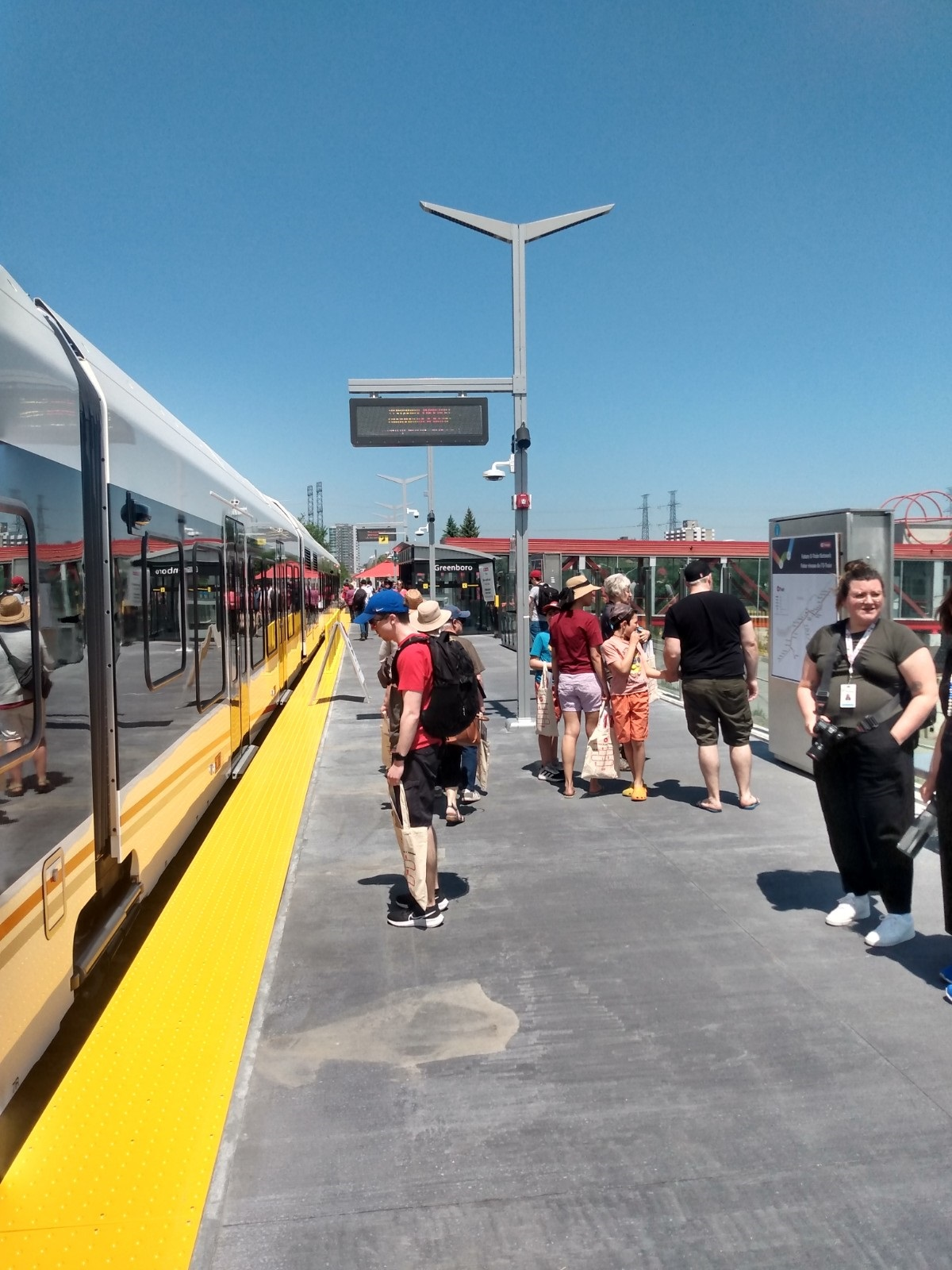
Greenboro station, opened to the public for Doors Open Ottawa 2023
