= Walkley station =

Railway station in Ottawa, Ontario, Canada

Walkley
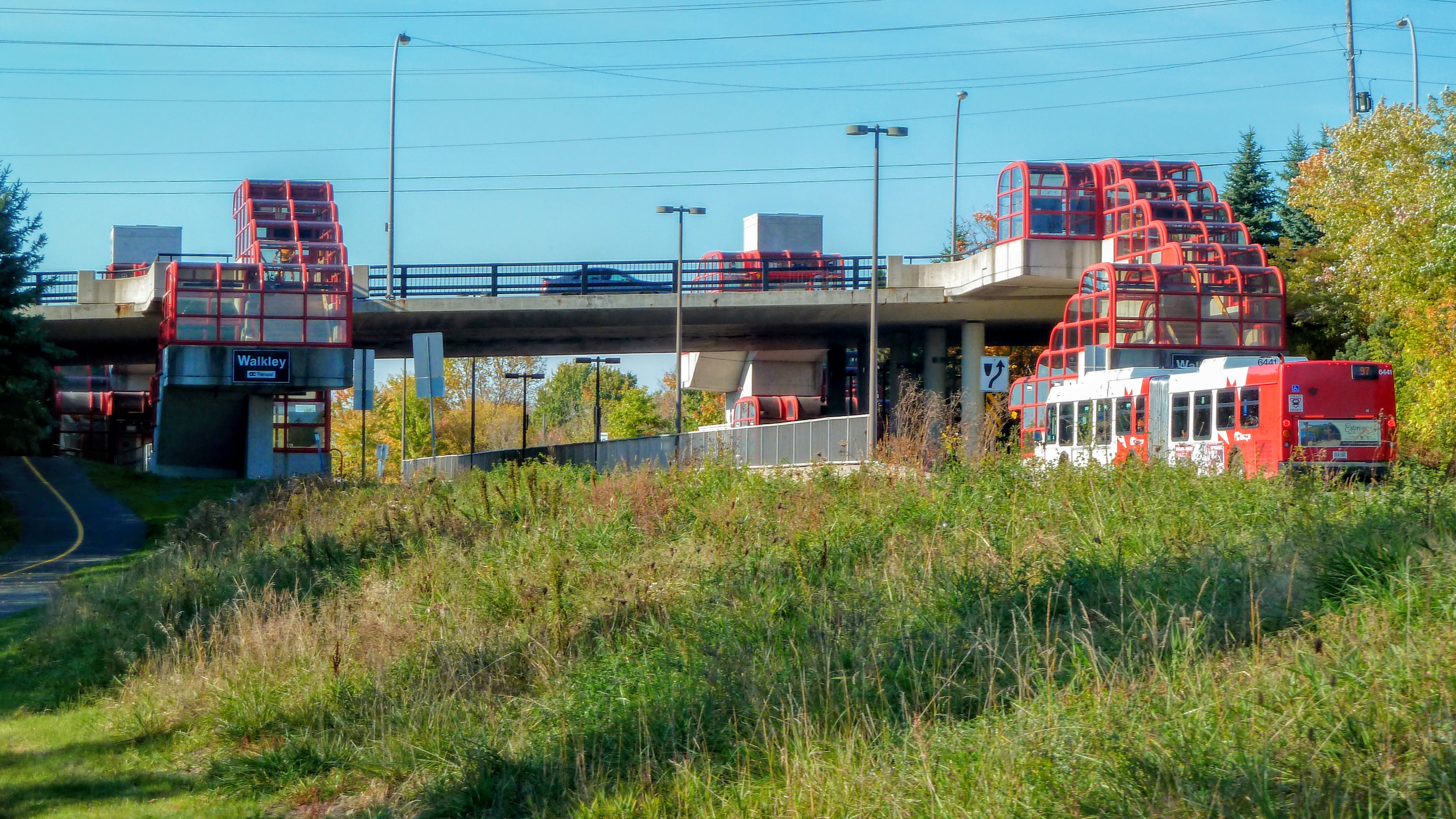
- Looking north at Walkley Transitway station

General information
- Location: Ottawa, Ontario; Canada
- Coordinates: 45°22′08″N 75°40′02″W
- Owner: OC Transpo
- Platforms: Single platform
- Tracks: 1

Construction
- Parking: No
- Cycle facilities: Yes (40 sheltered space)
- Accessible: Yes

History
- Opened: January 6, 2025

Services
Preceding station	OC Transpo	Following station
Mooney's Bay toward Bayview	Line 2	Greenboro toward Limebank
Greenboro toward Hawthorne	Route 98	Heron toward Hurdman
Greenboro toward Airport	Route 105	Heron toward St-Laurent
Former services
Preceding station	OC Transpo	Following station
Terminus	Route 99 Truncated April 2025	Marketplace toward Hurdman
Citigate Limited service Terminus	Route 99 Truncated April 2025	Marketplace toward Hurdman
Systemhouse Limited service One-way operation	Route 99 Truncated April 2025	Marketplace toward Hurdman
Location

Walkley station is an intermodal OC Transpo station in Ottawa, Ontario. It is located in on Walkley Road between Airport Parkway and Bank Street. There are plans for mixed-use development all around the station which is vacant.

Walkley station consists of a bus rapid transit station on the southeast Transitway and a rail station on the O-Train network. The two stations are not directly connected, requiring riders to go to street level in order to transfer. The railway station opened on January 6, 2025, as an infill station on Line 2.

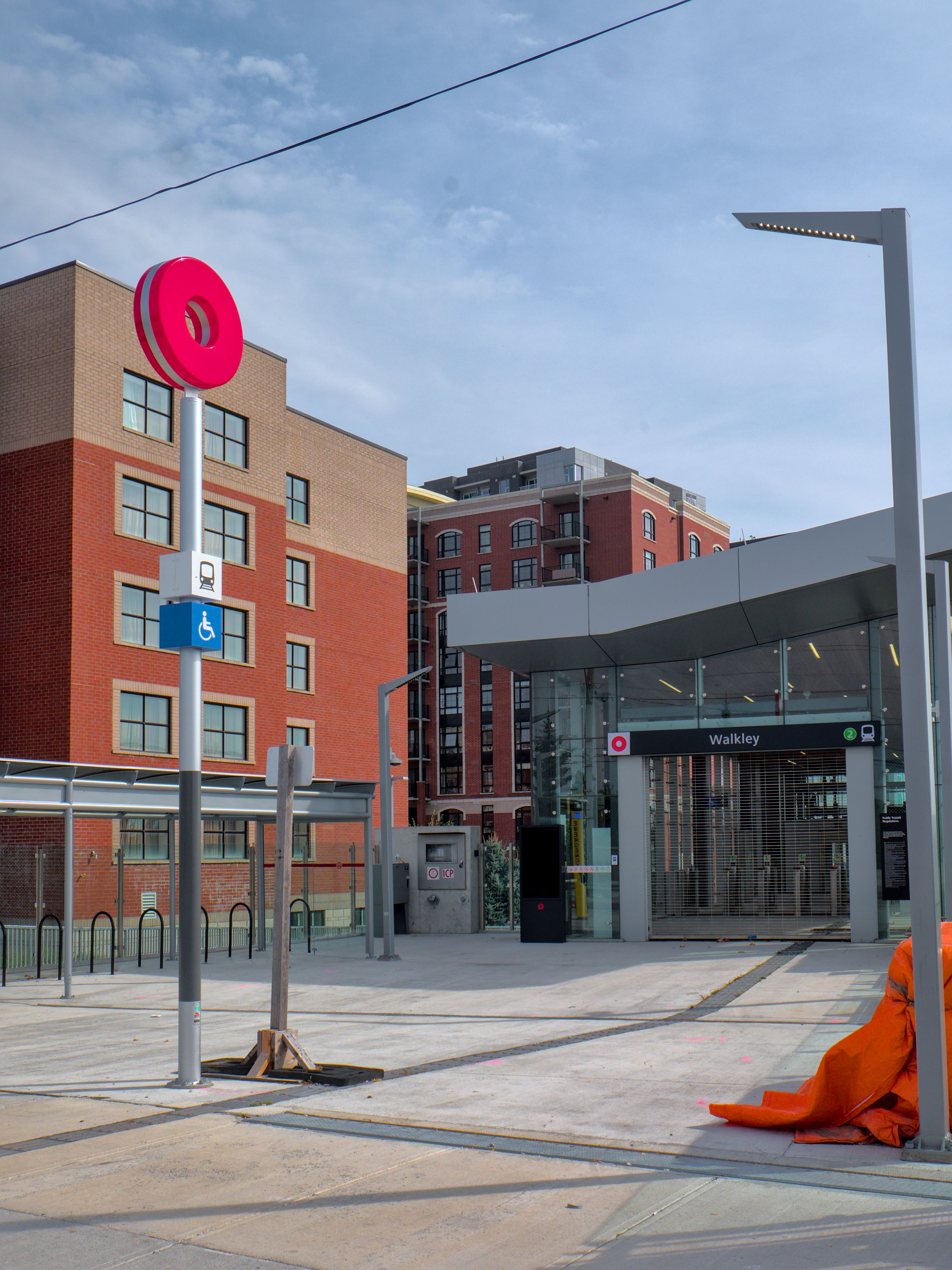
Entrance to the Trillium Line station, across the street from the Transitway station.

== History ==
Walkley station was originally planned to be part of the initial Trillium Line which opened in 2001, but it was cut for budgetary reasons before being added in the Stage 2 South expansion. A passing loop was added in 2013 just north of Walkley to increase train frequency and line capacity. Despite being single-tracked, the City of Ottawa has maintained that double-tracking the station is in its long-term plans.

== Service ==
The following routes serve Walkley station as of April 27, 2025:

Key
Line 1 (O-Train) Line 2 (O-Train) Line 4 (O-Train)	O-Train
E1	Shuttle Express
R1 R2 R4	O-Train replacement bus routes
N75	Night routes
40 12	Frequent routes
99 162	Local routes
275	Connexion routes
303	Shopper routes
405	Event routes
646	School routes
STO	Société de transport de l'Outaouais routes
Additional info: Line 1: Confederation Line; Line 2: Trillium Line; Line 4: Airport Link; Routes 5 to 199: Custom routing that that connects to Line 1 and/or 2; Routes 200 to 299: Connexion (peak-period only routes that connect to the O-Train); Routes 301 to 305: Shopper Routes (limited rural service); Routes 404 to 406: Canadian Tire Centre events; Routes 450 to 456: Lansdowne Park events; Routes 600 to 699: School Routes; Route R1: replaces Line 1 when it is out of service; Route R2: replaces Line 2 when it is out of service; Route R4: replaces Line 4 when it is out of service; Routes N39 to N98: night service (replaces Line 1 and N98 replaces Line 4); White backgrounds: limited service; Last two digits represent service area: 00s and 10s – Central; 20s – Gloucester; 30s – Orléans; 40s – Ottawa East; 50s – Ottawa West; 60s – Kanata, Stittsville; 70s – Barrhaven; 80s – Nepean; 90s – South Keys

Walkley station service
O-Train North/South	Line 2 (O-Train)
A Transitway North	R2 44 98 105 110 304 452
B Transitway South	R2 44 98 105 110 304
C	92
D	92
E	44 90 92 697 698
F	44 90 92 697 698

=== Notes ===
- Route 6 is available nearby at the corner of Bank and Walkley.
- Routes 90, 92, 697, and 698 only serve stops E and F once in each direction on school days during the school year.
- Route 110 only serves this station before the Trillium Line opens at 6:00 AM
- Route R2 is only active for Line 2 planned closures (replacement bus service).
