= Tremblay station =

Railway station in Ottawa, Ontario, Canada

Tremblay
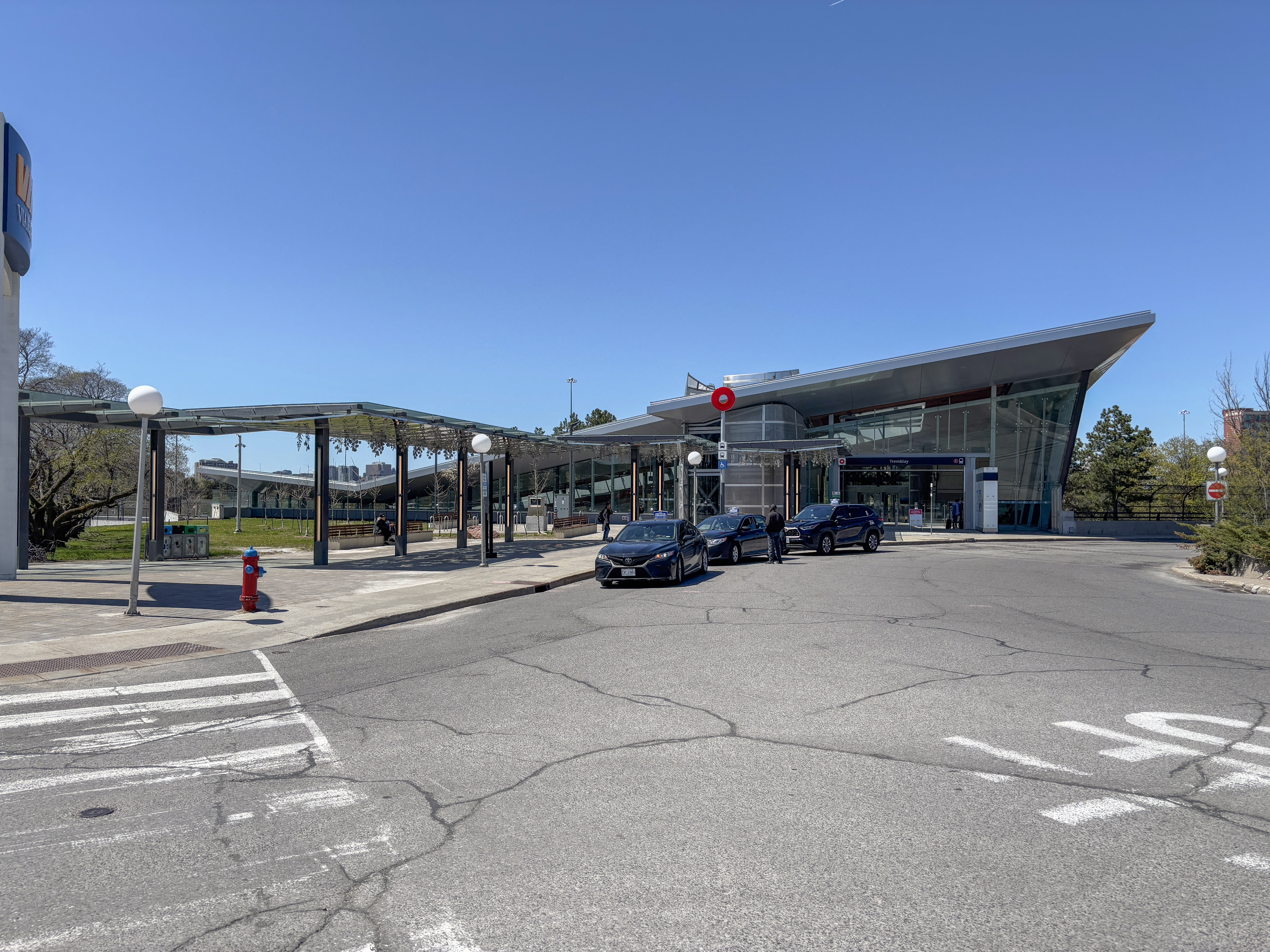
- Station entrance

General information
- Coordinates: 45°25′00″N 75°39′12″W
- Owner: OC Transpo
- Platforms: 2 side platforms
- Tracks: 2
- Connections: Ottawa train station

Construction
- Parking: No
- Cycle facilities: Confederation Pathway; Bicycle parking Stairway with bike ramps (runnels)
- Accessible: Yes

Other information
- Station code: 3024
- Website: Tremblay

History
- Opened: 17 November 1987 (As BRT station); 14 September 2019 (As LRT station)
- Rebuilt: 2015–2019
- Former names: Train station

Services
Preceding station	OC Transpo	Following station
Hurdman toward Tunney's Pasture	Line 1	St-Laurent toward Blair
Hurdman toward Airport	Route 105	St-Laurent Terminus
Location
- Location within Ottawa Location within Ontario Location within Canada

Tremblay station (/ˈtrɑːmbleɪ/ TRAWM-blay) is an O-Train station on Line 1 in Ottawa, Ontario. It is walking distance from the Ottawa train station, connecting to Via Rail Corridor inter-city rail services. The station opened on September 14, 2019 to replace the former Transitway bus rapid transit station known as Train Station (which closed on June 28, 2015).

== Location ==
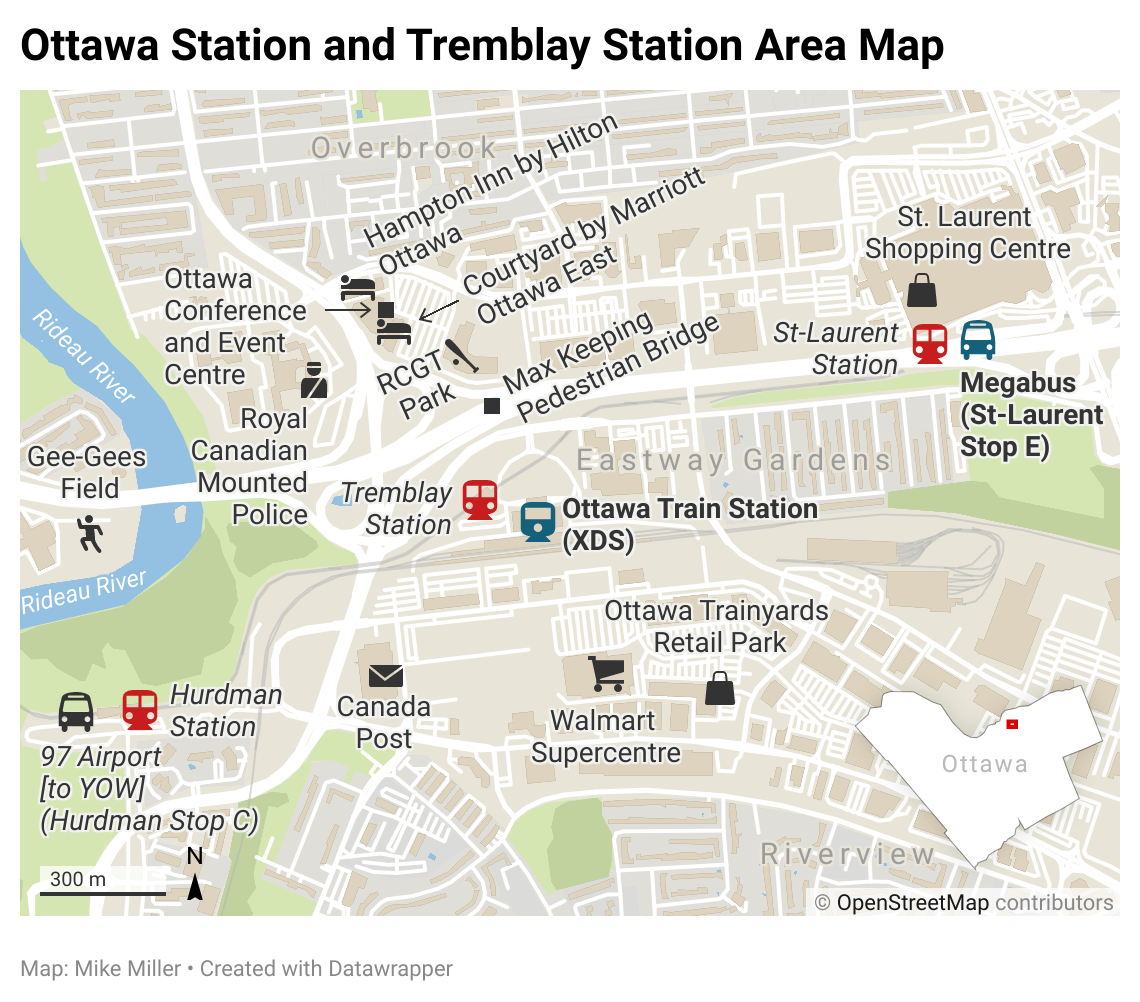
Ottawa station and Tremblay station area map

Tremblay station is located south of Tremblay Road and directly west of the Via Rail station known as Ottawa station. The Ottawa station entrance is less than a five minute walk from the O-Train Line 1 platforms on Level 1. While the stations are close to each other, the two buildings are not linked and transferring passengers are required to walk outside between them.

North of the station is the Max Keeping Pedestrian Bridge, which crosses Highway 417, allowing access to Ottawa Stadium (a minor-league baseball stadium) as well as the Courtyard by Marriott Ottawa East and Hampton Inn by Hilton Ottawa west of the stadium parking lot. These two hotels are the closest to the station, and are linked to each other by the Ottawa Conference and Event Centre. All of these are accessible within a 12–15 minute walk.

== Layout ==
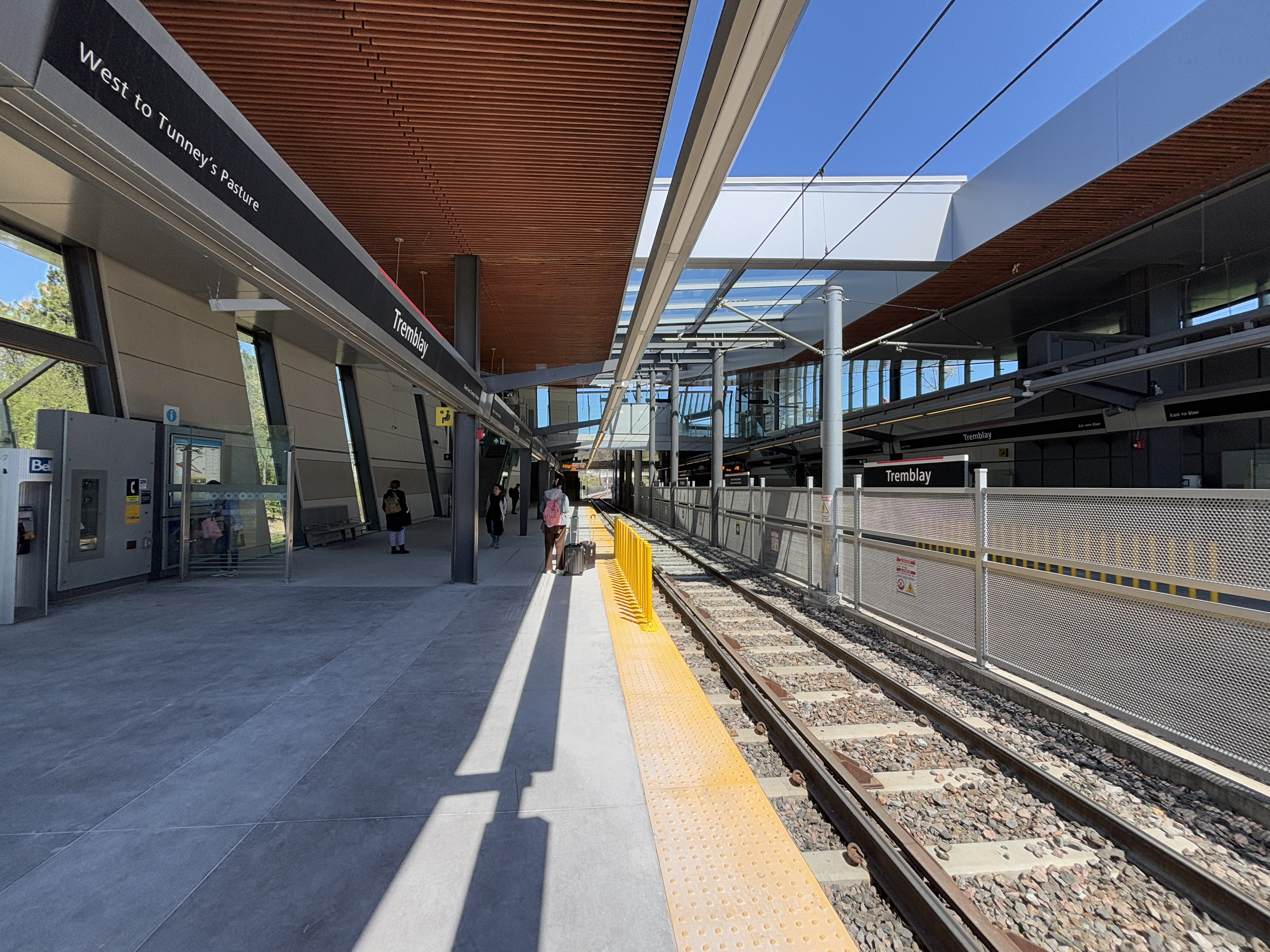
Tremblay station platform

Tremblay station is a side platform station located at grade in a cutting. The station's single entrance building, located at the same level and opposite the railway station entrance, contains the ticket barrier and exits onto a plaza.

The station's artwork is entitled National Garden, an installation by Jyhling Lee. A series of canopies on the plaza outside the station entrance features silhouettes of flowering plants seemingly cut out of the reflective material of the canopy ceilings and folded down to produce a suspended garden.

== Service ==
Key
Line 1 (O-Train) Line 2 (O-Train) Line 4 (O-Train)	O-Train
E1	Shuttle Express
R1 R2 R4	O-Train replacement bus routes
N75	Night routes
40 12	Frequent routes
99 162	Local routes
275	Connexion routes
303	Shopper routes
405	Event routes
646	School routes
STO	Société de transport de l'Outaouais routes
Additional info: Line 1: Confederation Line; Line 2: Trillium Line; Line 4: Airport Link; Routes 5 to 199: Custom routing that that connects to Line 1 and/or 2; Routes 200 to 299: Connexion (peak-period only routes that connect to the O-Train); Routes 301 to 305: Shopper Routes (limited rural service); Routes 404 to 406: Canadian Tire Centre events; Routes 450 to 456: Lansdowne Park events; Routes 600 to 699: School Routes; Route R1: replaces Line 1 when it is out of service; Route R2: replaces Line 2 when it is out of service; Route R4: replaces Line 4 when it is out of service; Routes N39 to N98: night service (replaces Line 1 and N98 replaces Line 4); White backgrounds: limited service; Last two digits represent service area: 00s and 10s – Central; 20s – Gloucester; 30s – Orléans; 40s – Ottawa East; 50s – Ottawa West; 60s – Kanata, Stittsville; 70s – Barrhaven; 80s – Nepean; 90s – South Keys

The following routes serve Tremblay station as of August 28, 2025:

Stop	Routes
West O-Train	Line 1 (O-Train)
East O-Train	Line 1 (O-Train)
A Tremblay Rd. East	N39 105 R1
B Tremblay Rd. West	N39 105 451 R1
