= South Keys station =

Railway station in Ottawa, Ontario, Canada

South Keys
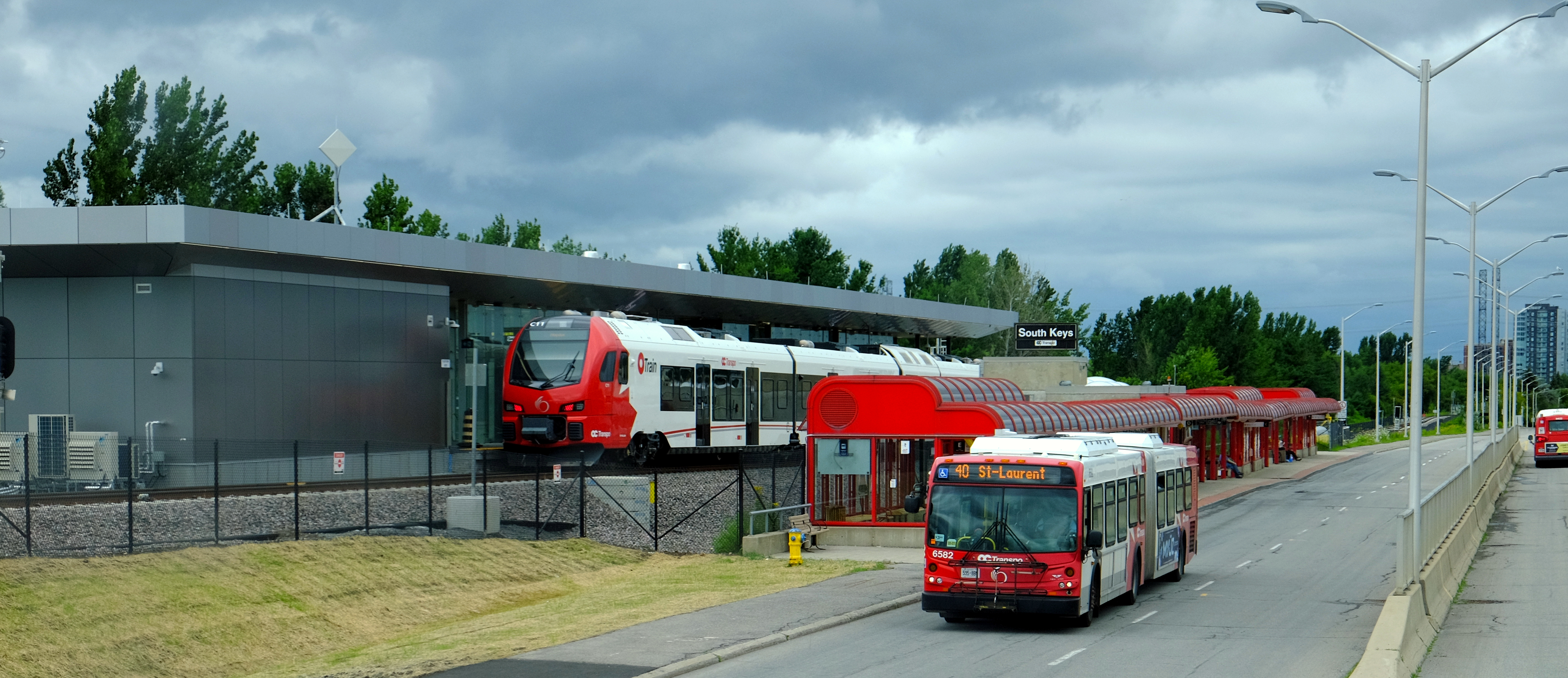
- South Keys station looking North.

General information
- Location: Ottawa, Ontario; Canada
- Coordinates: 45°21′13″N 75°39′19″W
- Owner: OC Transpo
- Platforms: Centre platform
- Tracks: 2

Construction
- Parking: 2982 spaces at South Keys Shopping Centre
- Cycle facilities: Yes (40 sheltered spaces)
- Accessible: Yes

History
- Opened: September 2, 1995 (Transitway); January 6, 2025 (O-Train)

Services
Preceding station	OC Transpo	Following station
Greenboro toward Bayview	Line 2	Leitrim toward Limebank
Terminus	Line 4	Uplands toward Airport
Hawthorne Terminus	Route 98	Greenboro toward Hurdman
Uplands toward Airport	Route 105	Greenboro toward St-Laurent
Former services
Preceding station	OC Transpo	Following station
Airport Terminus	Route 97 Closed April 2025	Greenboro toward Hurdman
Leitrim toward Barrhaven Centre	Route 99 Truncated April 2025	Greenboro toward Hurdman
Location

South Keys station is an O-Train station and the southernmost station of the Southeast Transitway in Ottawa. The station is located in the South Keys neighbourhood, behind the south end of the South Keys Shopping Centre, and between Bank Street and Airport Parkway. The Transitway station was opened for bus service on September 2, 1995.

In 2025, an O-Train station opened next to the existing Transitway station, serving as the transfer point between Line 2 (Trillium Line) and Line 4 (Airport Link).

== O-Train station ==
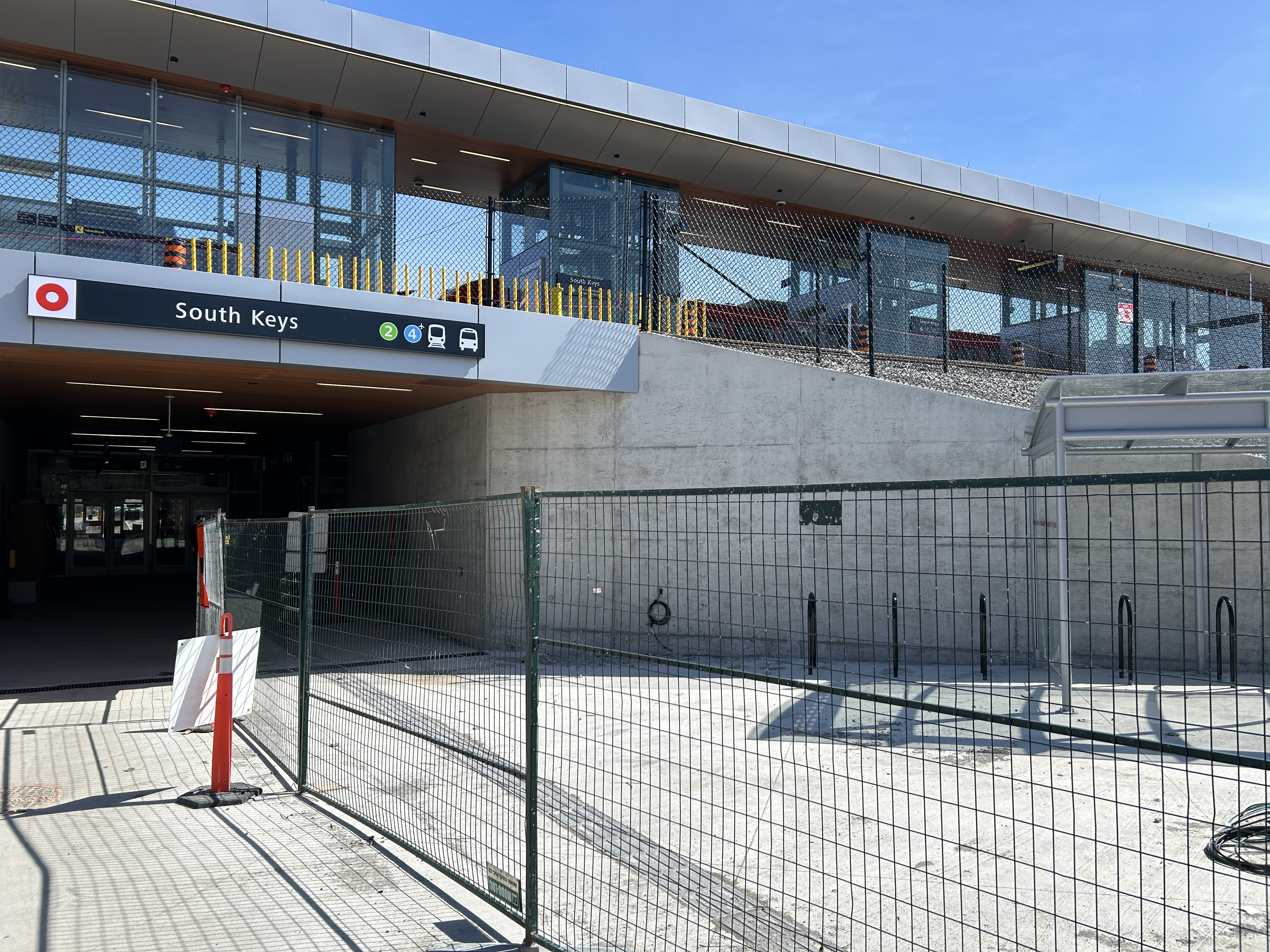
Upgraded west side entrance to South Keys

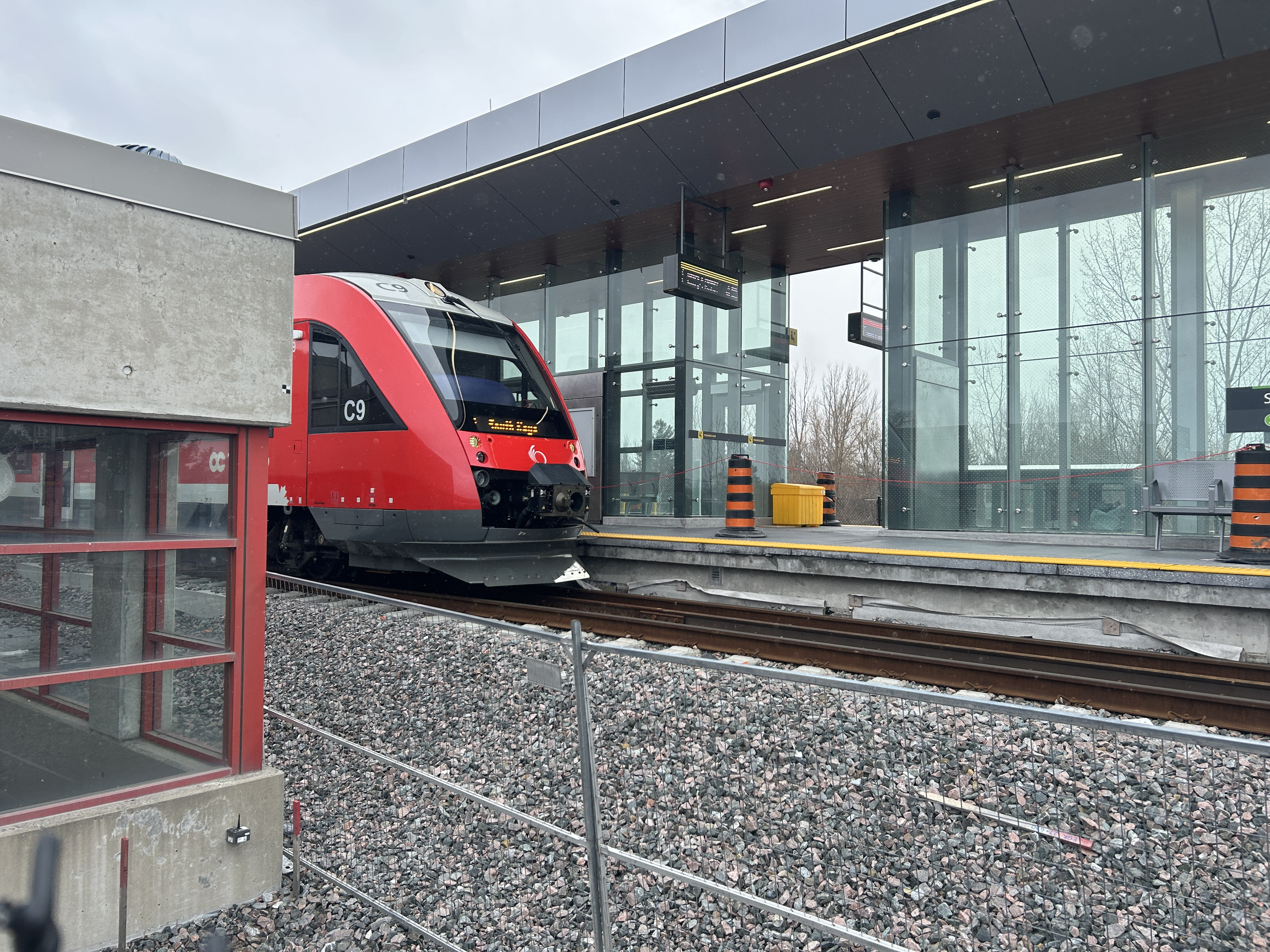
An Alstom Coradia LINT Line 4 train pulling into the northbound platform of the South Keys O-Train station

In 2025, an additional island platform O-Train station opened on the west side of the Transitway station, accessible by elevator or stairs via the existing pedestrian walkway beneath the station.

The South Keys O-Train station serves as a transfer station between Line 2 and Line 4, (the "Airport Link"), and was designed with a third pocket track to enable operations for cross platform transfers between the two lines. Line 4 trains solely use the southbound platform.

Previously, City Council approved the addition of an O-Train station at South Keys (instead of Lester) in conjunction of the expansion of the north–south light rail line. The project was cancelled on December 14, 2006.

== Service ==
The following routes serve South Keys station as of April 27, 2025:

Key
Line 1 (O-Train) Line 2 (O-Train) Line 4 (O-Train)	O-Train
E1	Shuttle Express
R1 R2 R4	O-Train replacement bus routes
N75	Night routes
40 12	Frequent routes
99 162	Local routes
275	Connexion routes
303	Shopper routes
405	Event routes
646	School routes
STO	Société de transport de l'Outaouais routes
Additional info: Line 1: Confederation Line; Line 2: Trillium Line; Line 4: Airport Link; Routes 5 to 199: Custom routing that that connects to Line 1 and/or 2; Routes 200 to 299: Connexion (peak-period only routes that connect to the O-Train); Routes 301 to 305: Shopper Routes (limited rural service); Routes 404 to 406: Canadian Tire Centre events; Routes 450 to 456: Lansdowne Park events; Routes 600 to 699: School Routes; Route R1: replaces Line 1 when it is out of service; Route R2: replaces Line 2 when it is out of service; Route R4: replaces Line 4 when it is out of service; Routes N39 to N98: night service (replaces Line 1 and N98 replaces Line 4); White backgrounds: limited service; Last two digits represent service area: 00s and 10s – Central; 20s – Gloucester; 30s – Orléans; 40s – Ottawa East; 50s – Ottawa West; 60s – Kanata, Stittsville; 70s – Barrhaven; 80s – Nepean; 90s – South Keys

South Keys station service
North O-Train	Line 2 (O-Train)
South O-Train	Line 2 (O-Train)
South O-Train (Airport Boarding Zone)	Line 4 (O-Train)
A Transitway North	R2 6 40 43 90 92 98 105 110 116 117 197 198 294 304 452 617 640 644 649 697 698
B Local South	40 294 697 698
C Local East	6 43 98 644 649
D Rail Replacement and Overnight	R2 105 110 304
E Local West	90 92 116 117 197 198 617 640

== Notes ==
- During the early morning before the beginning of O-Train Line 2 service hours, Route 110 is extended from Limebank to Greenboro station but it does not serve any extra stops along the extension.

== Safety issues ==
This station has a history of safety concerns during the night time hours. There were several incidents involving assaults, swarming and vandalism in the vicinity which prompted some increased safety measures. This station has a Transecure night stop which all buses use after 9 PM.
