= O-Train =

Urban rail transit system in Ottawa, Ontario

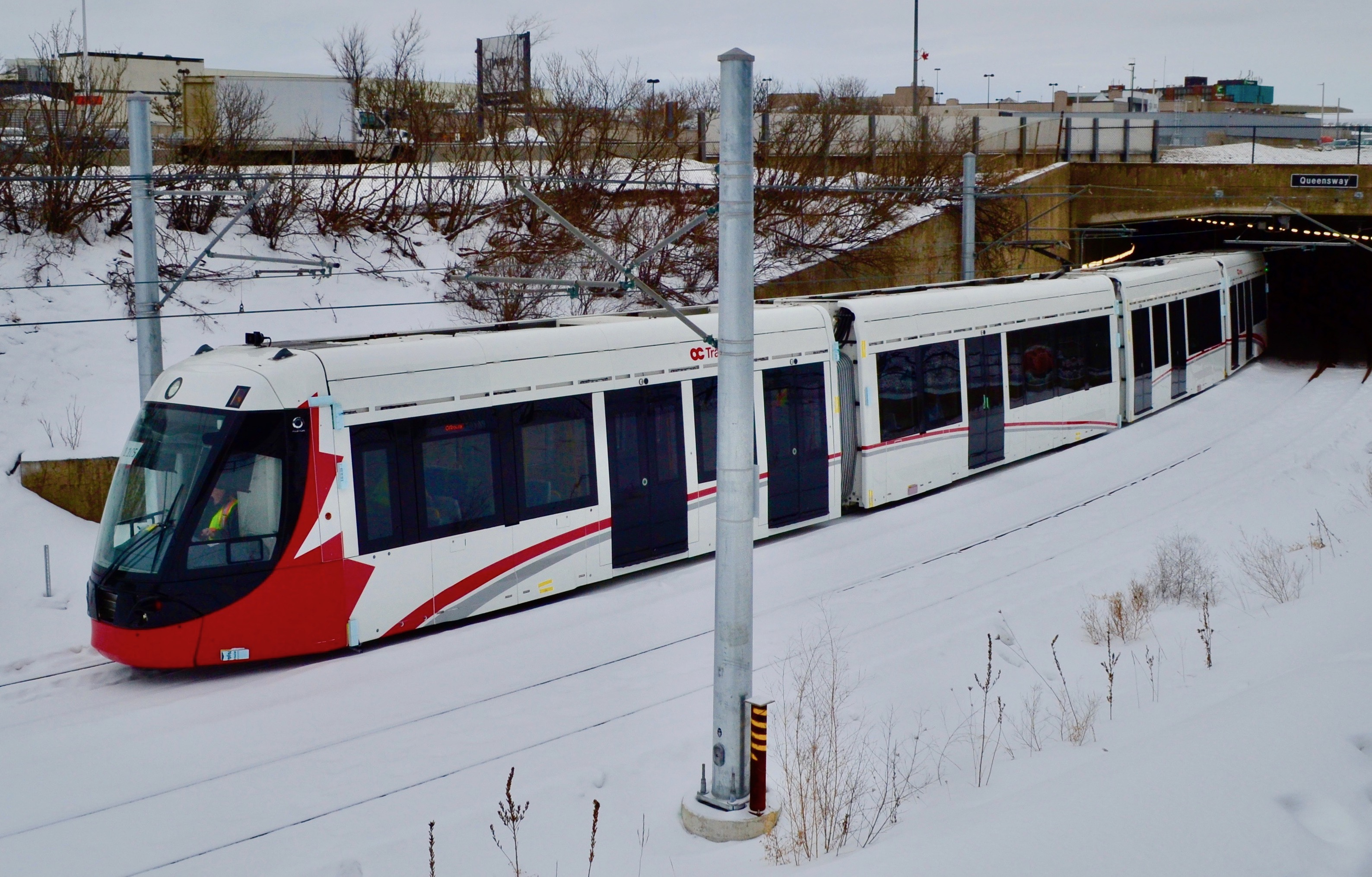
- A Citadis Spirit train on Line 1

Overview
- Owner: City of Ottawa
- Locale: Ottawa, Ontario
- Transit type: Light rail; Diesel light rail
- Number of lines: 3 (+1 under construction)
- Number of stations: 25 (+16 under construction)
- Daily ridership: 89,500 (weekdays, Q2 2026)
- Annual ridership: 26,523,100 (2025)

Operation
- Began operation: October 15, 2001; 25 years ago
- Operator: OC Transpo
- Character: At-grade, elevated and underground

Technical
- System length: 35.5 km (22.1 mi) (+27 km (17 mi) under construction)
- Track gauge: 1,435 mm (4 ft 8 1/2 in) standard gauge
- Top speed: 80 km/h (50 mph)
System map

Key

The O-Train is an urban rail transit system in Ottawa, Ontario, Canada, operated by OC Transpo. The O-Train system consists of three lines, all of which are fully grade-separated. As of May 2026, Line 1 is currently being extended and Line 3 will be constructed as part of the Stage 2 project, with new segments being phased in between 2026 and 2027.

The O-Train network currently operates one light rail line, Line 1, and two diesel light rail lines, Line 2 and Line 4. Line 1 travels in a 2.8 km tunnel in the downtown core, and the rest of the network continues to operate grade-separated on surface-level, trenched, or elevated tracks.

Line 1 is being extended in both directions, and the eastward extension to Trim station in Orleans was most recently scheduled to open first in Q2 2026, but there is no current timeline for its opening since testing has not yet begun. By 2027, the westward expansion of Line 1 to Algonquin station and the construction of new Line 3 to Moodie station in the west end are expected to be completed. These expansions will bring the system's total length to 64.5 km (40.1 mi), with four lines and 41 stations.

== Overview ==
Existing
Line	Opened	Stations	Length	Technology
Line 1	September 14, 2019	13	12.5 km (7.8 mi)	Light rail
Line 2	October 15, 2001	11	19 km (12 mi)	Diesel light rail
Line 4	January 6, 2025	3	4 km (2.5 mi)	Diesel light rail
Under construction
Line 1, Line 3	2026–2027	16	27.0 km (16.8 mi)	Light rail

There are 3 operating O-Train lines:

- Line 1 is a light rail line running east–west from Blair to Tunney's Pasture. It connects to Transitway services at each terminus and with Line 2 at Bayview. With the exception of the 2.8km downtown tunnel portion which includes three underground stations, the rest of alignment currently follows former Transitway bus rapid transit infrastructure. St-Laurent is the only underground station outside the downtown tunnel.
- Line 2 is a partially single-tracked, 19 km (12 mi) diesel light rail line that runs north to south from Bayview to Limebank, running alongside the southeast Transitway for part of its journey. Trains utilize sidings, as well as the two double-tracked sections in the northernmost and southernmost ends to pass each other. The line had closed May 2020 for numerous upgrades as part of the Stage 2 project, and reopened January 6, 2025.
- Line 4 is a 4 km (2.5 mi) single tracked diesel light rail line with a single passing siding at Uplands. The line runs west to east from Airport to South Keys where it connects to Line 2.

== History ==
=== Pilot project ===
The "O-Train" (now Line 2) was introduced in 2001 as a pilot project to provide an alternative to the busways on which Ottawa had long depended exclusively for its high-grade transit service. The original north-south 8 km (5 mi) single tracked line had cost $21 million to construct and purchase three low floor Bombardier Talent diesel multiple unit trains, and $8 million to operate for two years. Its relatively little cost stemmed from simple station construction, and the reuse of a Canadian Pacific Railway freight railway. It is often described as "light rail", partly because there were plans to extend it into Ottawa's downtown as a tramway-like service, and partly because the original trains are smaller and lighter than most mainline trains in North America and do not meet the Association of American Railroads' standards for crash strength.

=== Name ===
The system's name was proposed by Acart Communications, an Ottawa advertising agency. The name "O-Train" was based on the classic Duke Ellington signature tune "Take the 'A' Train", which refers to the New York City Subway's A train. Because Ottawa is a bilingual city, the name had to work in both English and French. It survived an internal OC Transpo naming competition and was adopted soon after.

From its inception until 2014, the term "O-Train" initially referred to the north–south diesel line. With the construction of a second line, the east/west Confederation Line, the O-Train branding was extended to include both rail transit services, with the original service being renamed as the Trillium Line.

=== Early extension plans ===
On July 12, 2006, Ottawa City Council voted by a vote of 14 to 7, with 1 councillor absent, to award the north–south expansion to the Siemens/PCL/Dufferin design team. The proposed extension, which was not undertaken, would have replaced the Trillium Line with an electric LRT system running on double track, as opposed to the current single-track diesel system.

According to the plan, the line was to be extended east from its current northern terminus to run through LeBreton Flats and downtown Ottawa as far as the University of Ottawa, and south-west from its Greenboro terminus to the growing Riverside South community and Barrhaven. Much of the route would have run through the undeveloped Riverside South area to allow a large new suburb to be constructed in the area south of the airport. The line would not have connected to the airport. Construction of the extension was scheduled to begin in the autumn of 2006, resulting in the shutdown of operations in May 2007, and to have been completed in autumn 2009 with operations resuming under the new systems and rolling stock.

The diesel-powered Talents would have been replaced with electric trams more suitable for on-street operation in the downtown area, specifically the Siemens S70 Avanto (due to the "design, build, and maintain" contracting process which has focused upon the bid proposing this vehicle). Other bids had proposed the Bombardier Flexity Swift and a Kinki Sharyo tram.

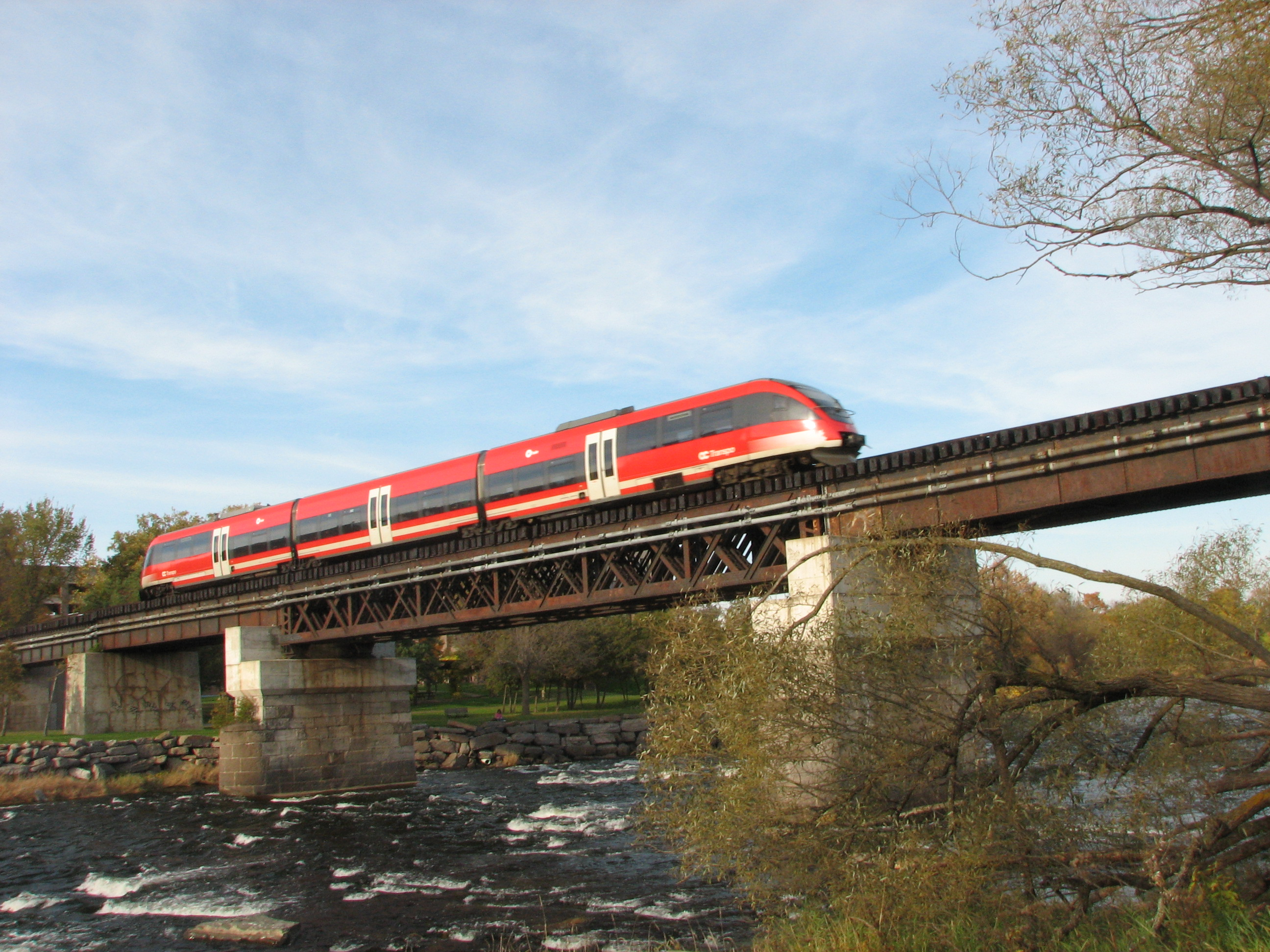
Trillium Line crossing Rideau River.

With the use of electric power, greater frequency, and street-level running in central Ottawa, the expanded system would have borne much more resemblance to the urban tramways usually referred to by the phrase "light rail" than does the pilot project (though the use of the Capital Railway track and additional existing tracks which have been acquired along its route may cause it to remain a mainline railway for legal purposes).

The estimated cost of the north–south expansion would have been just under $780 million (not including the proposed maintenance facility), making the project the largest in the city's history since the Rideau Canal project. The federal and provincial governments had each promised $200 million for the expansion, with the city contributing the remainder of the cost using funds from various sources including the provincial gasoline tax, the city's transit reserve fund, and the Provincial Transportation Infrastructure Grant. 4.5% of the total project cost was expected to come from the property tax base. The city also requested studies on an extension of the railway from the proposed University of Ottawa terminus through to Hurdman station.

=== Expansion controversies ===
The north–south expansion planning process became a source of great controversy. It was a major issue in the 2006 municipal election. The incumbent mayor Bob Chiarelli had long been the main advocate for light rail in Ottawa. Terry Kilrea, who finished second to Chiarelli in the 2003 municipal election and briefly ran for mayor in 2006, believed the plan was vastly too expensive and would also be a safety hazard for Ottawa drivers. He called for the entire light rail project to be scrapped. Mayoral candidate Alex Munter supported light rail but argued that the plan would do little to meet Ottawa's transit needs and that the true final expense of the project had been kept secret. He wanted to cut the Barrhaven leg and start work on an east–west line. Larry O'Brien, a businessman who entered the race late, wanted to postpone the project for six months before making a final decision.

Transport 2000 president David Jeanes, a longtime supporter of light rail in Ottawa and a member of the city's transportation advisory committee, stated that he believed that the project was being "designed to fail". City transportation staff, though long in favour of bus rapid transit systems, disagreed with Jeanes's assessment.

Numerous alternatives were proposed, including Alex Munter's plan, the "Practical Plan" by the Friends of the O-Train, and the Ottawa Transit group plan.

=== Cancellation of expansion ===
Abandoned extension plan

On December 1, 2006, the new council took office. It started a debate on the issue during the week of December 4 with three options including the status quo, the truncation of portions of the current track or the cancellation of the contract. An Ottawa Sun article had reported on December 5 that if the project were cancelled, there could be lawsuits by Siemens against the city totalling as much as $1 billion.

The new mayor, Larry O'Brien, opted to keep the extension to Barrhaven while eliminating the portion that would run from Lebreton Flats to the University of Ottawa. However, Council also introduced the possibility of building several tunnels in the downtown core in replacement of rail lines on Albert and Slater. Total costs for the tunnels would have been, according to city staff, about $500 million. The council voted by a margin of 12–11 in favour of continuing the project, but without the downtown section. An environmental assessment was to be conducted on the possibility of building a tunnel through downtown. Another attempt made by Councillor Gord Hunter to review the project later failed. At the same time, the Ontario government was also reviewing the project before securing its $200 million funding. However, it was reported that both the federal and provincial funding totalling $400 million was not secured before the contract deadline of December 15. O'Brien withdrew his support, and a new vote was held on December 14. With the presence of Rainer Bloess, who was absent during the previous vote, the council decided to cancel the project by a margin of 13-11 despite the possibility of lawsuits from Siemens, the contract holder. It was reported on February 7, 2007, that the cost of the cancelled project was about $73 million.

On February 14, 2007, it was reported that Siemens had written a letter to the city and gave two options. The first proposal was for the city to pay $175 million in compensation to Siemens in order to settle the dispute and cancel the contract. The second proposal was to re-launch the project with an additional price tag of $70 million to the cost of the original project. Councillor Diane Deans had tabled a motion for a debate on February 23, 2007, but it was later cancelled. A poll conducted by the mayor's office showed that a majority of south-end residents disagreed with the cancellation of the project but only a third wanted to revive it. In 2008, lawsuits against the city of Ottawa over its cancelled light rail system totalled $36.7 million.

=== East–west line ===
The city also committed funds to perform an environmental assessment for an east–west route, running between Kanata and Orleans mainly via an existing railway right-of-way bypassing downtown. Planners initially explored the possibility of using the system's three Talents for an east–west pilot project after they were to be replaced by electric trams on the north–south line. Due to the cancellation of the north–south electrification project, any further plans for the diesel-powered trains on that route are uncertain. It was once thought that Transport Canada might not approve its use on the existing tracks for an east–west system, since they would have to be shared with other mainline trains. The city opted to do the westward expansion in stages, beginning with the east–west LRT Confederation Line.

=== Other possibilities ===
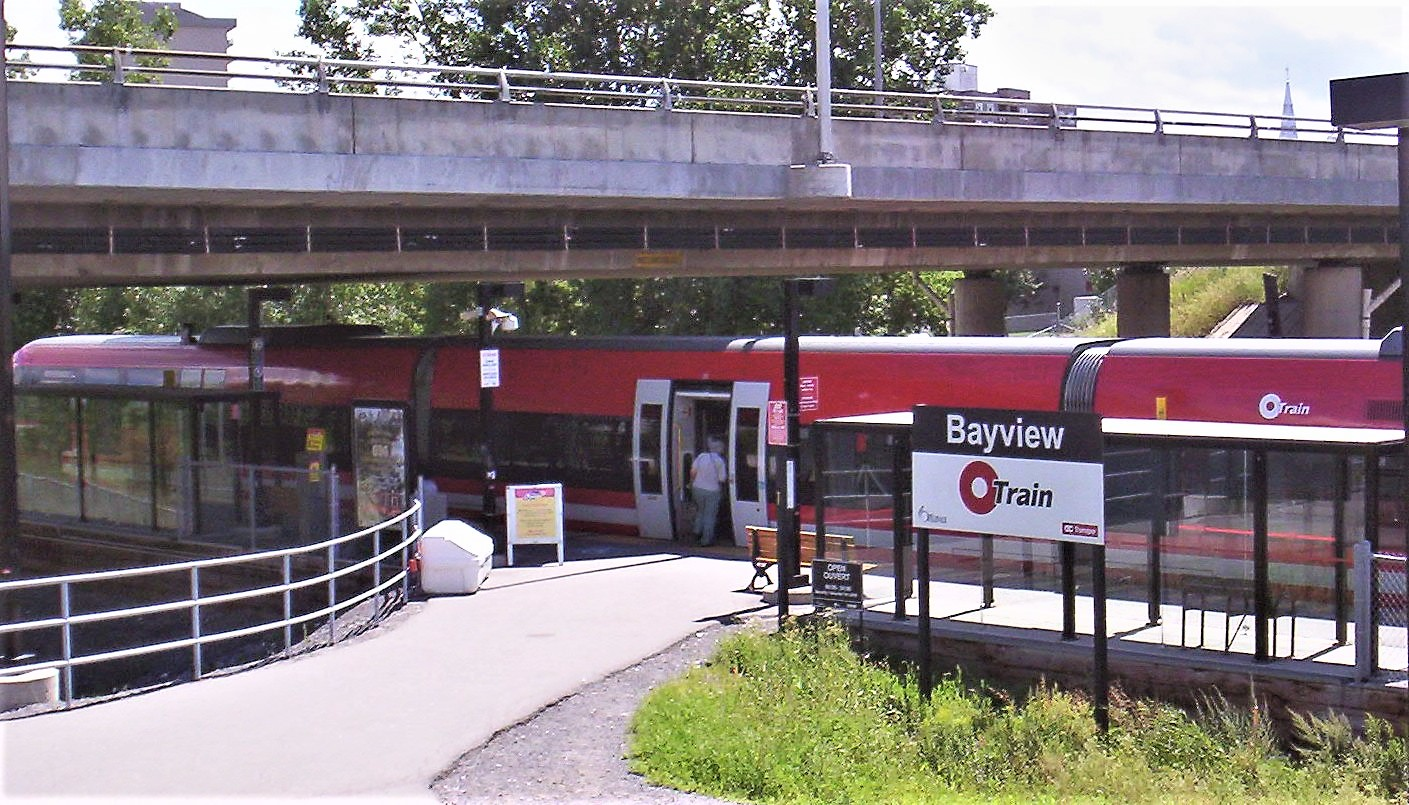
Bayview station's platform, pictured in 2005 before the construction of Line 1

Long-term plans had included lines on Carling Avenue from the existing Dow's Lake station westward to Bayshore and Bells Corners, and from the Rideau Centre south-east to the area of Innes Road and Blair Road via Rideau Street, Montreal Road, and Blair Road. The city has conducted a $4 million environmental assessment study for these two corridors. There were also possibilities of a rail link to Hurdman station.

Service to Gatineau would also be possible to serve commuters, as there is a railway bridge over the Ottawa River nearby, but the government of Gatineau was until 2016 opposed to extending the Trillium Line into its territory; Ottawa's city staff have taken steps to isolate the north–south line from the bridge, so it would need to be re-built north of Bayview station. A line running into Gatineau was not included in the plans for expansion up to 2021.

=== Mayor's Committee on Transportation ===
In January 2007, Mayor Larry O'Brien formed a special committee to review the city's transportation needs and provide a report to city council by the beginning of June 2007. On June 1, this report was presented to the mayor, and was subsequently released to the media and the public on June 6. This report was criticized by some for planning service to Smiths Falls and Arnprior while neglecting to plan service to Rockland and Embrun which were, at the time, rapidly growing communities east of Ottawa.

The committee, headed by the former member of parliament and cabinet minister David Collenette, recommended that Ottawa's needs would be best served by light rail through the future. This plan called for expansion of the system using rail rights-of-way and stations (Via Rail, CP Rail, and Ottawa Central Railway), constructing new stations and a tunnel through the downtown core, going through the former Union Station (now the Government of Canada Conference Centre). The plan called for using bi-mode diesel-electric trains or multiple units, allowing rapid expansion on current track powered by diesel engines, while switching to electric power through the tunnel downtown to remove the concerns about underground exhaust. Through the next thirty years, the plan called for expansion of up to six lines, including links to surrounding municipalities, the city of Gatineau and MacDonald-Cartier International Airport, with the lines gradually being electrified and expanded as required.

Only the initial portion of the project was budgeted, and using only rough numbers, but the committee felt that this could be completed for between $600 million to $900 million, including the downtown tunnel portion, within the following 5–10 years.

=== New transit plan ===
On November 28, 2007, the city council announced the expansion of rail service to Riverside South, as well as a downtown tunnel, with an environmental assessment study to determine whether it should be used by bus or rail service. Options were also open for additional extensions to Cumberland South to the east and south of Lincoln Fields Station at the Queensway via the transitway.

On March 3, 2008, the city of Ottawa revealed four different options for its transit expansion plan, and presented at Open House consultation meetings during the same week. All plans included the construction of a downtown tunnel or subway to accommodate transit service and possible addition of businesses underground, as well as the expansion of rapid transit to the suburbs. One of the plans included light rail from Baseline Station to Blair Station and an expansion to the Ottawa Airport. All plans would have a completion date of about 2031, and costs were estimated at least $3 billion in total including $1 billion for the downtown tunnel.

The majority of the public supported a downtown tunnel and the fourth transit option during public consultations meetings in Centretown, Barrhaven, Kanata and Orleans during the month. There were some suggesting that the light-rail service be extended to the suburbs rather than ending at the proposed stations. Concerns were particularly voiced by south-end residents where the initial rail plan was to be built. On April 16, 2008, the Transit Committee tabled a document which recommended the fourth option.

The plan was passed by the city council with a vote of 19–4 and included motions for possible rail extensions to the suburbs depending on population density and available funding. However, Kitchissippi Ward councillor Christine Leadman expressed concerns of the environment integrity impacts of light-rail along the Kichi Zibi Mikan which is situated on NCC land. At least three councillors, including Leadman, Capital Ward councillor Clive Doucet and Kanata North Ward councillor Marianne Wilkinson, expressed preferences for light-rail service along Carling Avenue instead of the Parkway, although rail would run through many traffic lights and stops. The NCC also suggested that the city consider options other than the Kichi Zibi Mikan. Three Ottawa Centre candidates for the 2008 federal election – incumbent New Democratic Party MP Paul Dewar, Liberal candidate Penny Collenette, and Conservative candidate Brian McGarry – also expressed opposition to building a light-rail line along the Parkway.

Another potential route identified between Lincoln Fields and the Transitway near Westboro was a small strip of land located on the southern side of Richmond Road near the location of the defunct Byron Avenue streetcar line although costs would be much higher than the Parkway route.

In early September 2008, city staff suggested that the first phase of the transit plan to be built would be similar to Option 3 with rail service from Riverside South to Blair Station via a downtown tunnel, the construction of a by-pass transit corridor via the General Hospital and a streetcar circuit along Carling Avenue, although Alex Cullen mentioned that Council already rejected the option of streetcars running on that road.

=== Confederation Line ===
On December 19, 2012, the city council unanimously approved the construction of the Confederation Line, to run east–west from Blair to Tunney's Pasture. The line runs on an existing Transitway infrastructure, with the exception of the 3-stop downtown tunnel. It began service on September 14 2019.

Corkstown Yard is a future second maintenance, storage and administrative facility for LRT fleet for the Confederation Line of Ottawa's O-Train light rail system. The yard will open in 2027 along with the Moodie Branch of the Stage 2 West extension for Line 3.

== Stage 2 ==
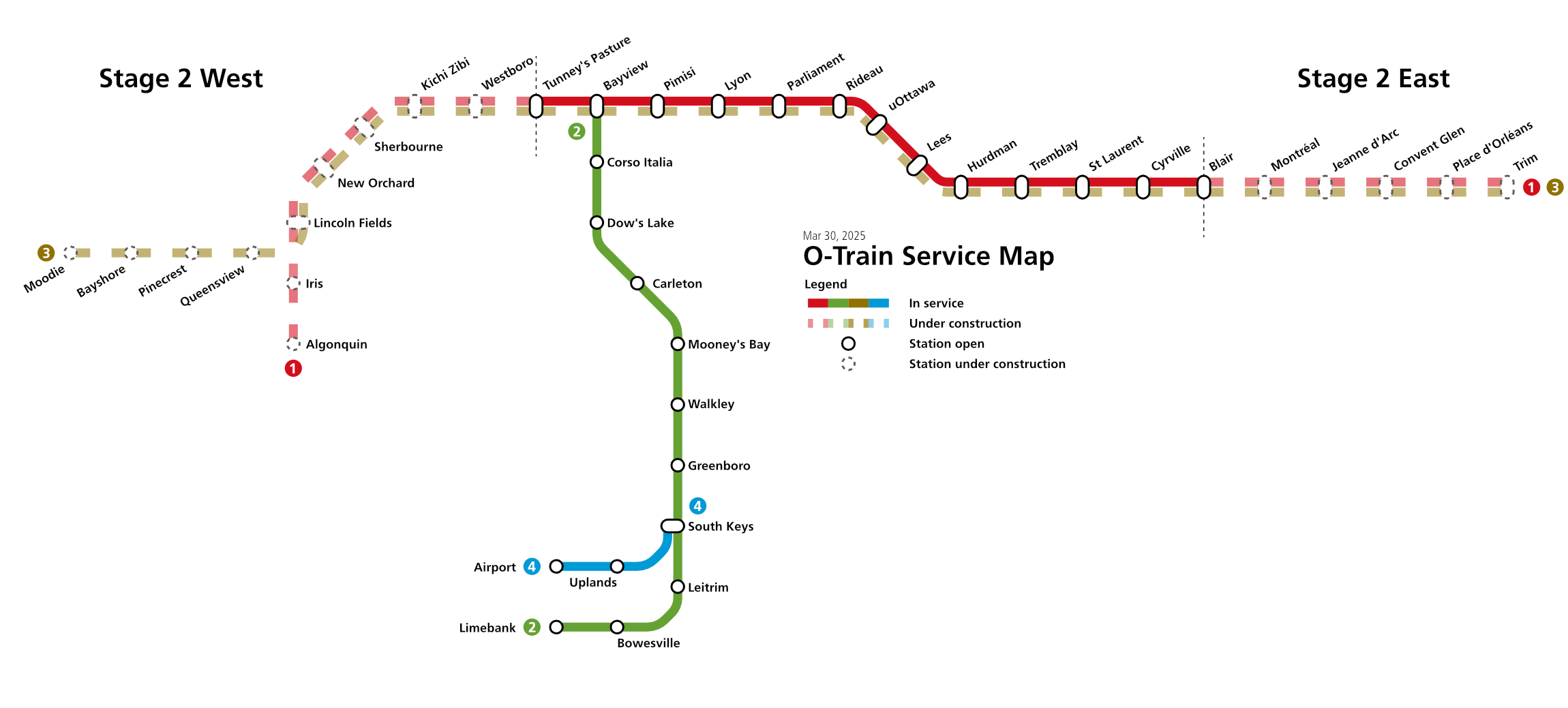
In service and under construction sections of the O-Train network, as of March 2025

Stage 2 is the ongoing project to add 44 kilometres of rail and 24 new stations in addition to stage 1 of the Confederation Line that was opened in September 2019. Initially approved in 2013, it will bring 77% of Ottawa residents within 5 km (3.1 mi) of rail. The expansion began construction in Q2 2019, and is expected to be entirely complete by 2027 with the extension south complete in 2025, east expected in 2026 and west in 2027.

The project is made up of three extensions: an eastern extension of the Confederation Line by five stations from Blair station to Trim Road, a western extension by 11 stations from Tunney's Pasture to Baseline station and Moodie station with a split at Lincoln Fields station, and an upgrade of the Trillium Line that includes two new stations along the existing alignment, an extension southwards by four stations to a new Limebank station, and a shuttle line to the Ottawa Macdonald–Cartier International Airport.

On March 6, 2019, the Ottawa city council voted 19–3 to approve the C$4.66 billion contracts to begin construction of the Stage 2 plan. The southern extension of the Trillium Line was awarded to TransitNext (solely operated by SNC-Lavalin), while the East and West extension of the Confederation Line was awarded to East West Connectors, a partnership between Vinci SA and Kiewit Corporation. Financial close was reached with TransitNext on March 29, 2019, and a month later with East West Connectors.

=== Openings ===
On January 6, 2025, the South extension reopened Line 2 after 4 years of construction, extending it south to Limebank station, as well as adding the Corso Italia and Walkley infill stations. Line 4, the shuttle to the airport, opened at the same time.

=== Construction ===
Construction began in 2019 with preliminary tree removal, utility work and road realignments. Work on the new rail yard for the Trillium Line as well as guideway work for the southward extension and airport link began over the summer of 2019. On May 3, 2020, the Trillium Line closed to allow upgrades to the existing alignment to be completed. On September 25, 2020, construction of the cut and cover tunnels for the westward Confederation Line extension began.

== Future extensions ==
Multiple major extensions of the O-Train are currently under construction or in the planning stages. This includes the above described Stage 2, as well as a future Stage 3 expansion plan.

Project	Status	Description	Length	Expected opening
East Extension	Under construction	Extends Line 1 east from Blair station to a new terminus at Trim Road in Orleans. The extension will run down the median of Highway 174 with five new stations.	12 km (7.5 mi)	2026 (Q4)
West Extension	Under construction	Extends Line 1 and creates Line 3 running west from Tunney's Pasture to Moodie Drive and Algonquin College. The extension will split at Lincoln Fields with Line 3 continuing West to Moodie Drive and Line 1 continuing south to Algonquin College. The extension will involve two cut-and-cover tunnels totaling 3 km (1.9 mi) in length and will add a total of 11 new stations.	15 km (9.3 mi)	2027 (Q3)
Kanata Extension	Environmental Assessment Complete	Extends Line 3 west from Moodie Drive to Kanata, with eight new stations and a new terminus at Hazeldean Road. The project would be a part of O-Train Stage 3.	11 km (6.8 mi)	After 2031 (Note: Extension could open sooner if federal and provincial funding is secured.)
Barrhaven Extension	Environmental Assessment Complete	Extends Line 1 south to Barrhaven Town Centre from Algonquin College, with seven new stations and a new Light Rail Maintenance and Storage Facility in Barrhaven.	10 km (6.2 mi)	After 2031

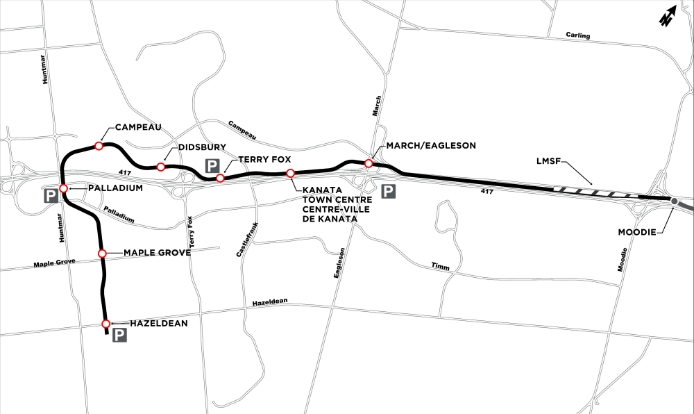
Kanata Extension

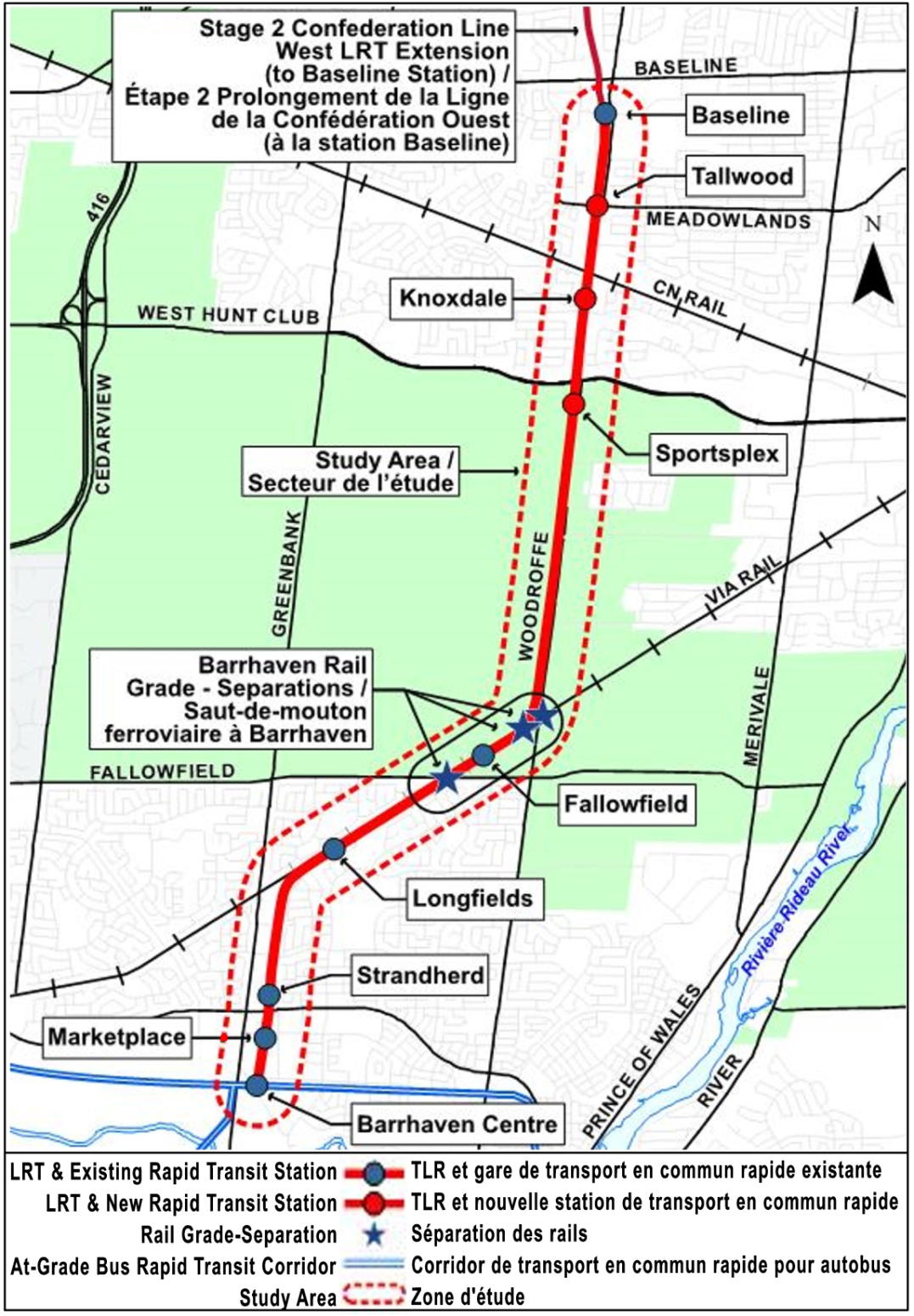
Barrhaven Extension

Planned Stage 3 LRT Extensions

=== STO connection ===
The O-Train could potentially become a connection point with the proposed Gatineau tramway system, to be run by the STO, which is planned to operate partly on the Ottawa side of the river. On May 15, 2020, the city of Gatineau presented two options to integrate its proposed tramway with Ottawa's transit system: either running the new LRT on the surface along Wellington Street to Elgin Street, or constructing a new tunnel below Sparks Street to Elgin. The surface option on Wellington also includes the possibility of creating a future transit loop by having the tramway cross back into Gatineau via the Alexandra Bridge. In May 2021, Gatineau announced that it found the Sparks Street tunnel option to be the "optimal solution," while noting the surface option remains a possibility should the tunnel prove to be unfeasible.

== See also ==
- 2016 Ottawa sinkhole
- Light rail in Canada
- Light rail in North America
- List of tram and light rail transit systems
- Ottawa Electric Railway
- Rapibus
- Public transport in Canada
