= Uplands station =

Railway station in Ottawa, Ontario, Canada

Uplands
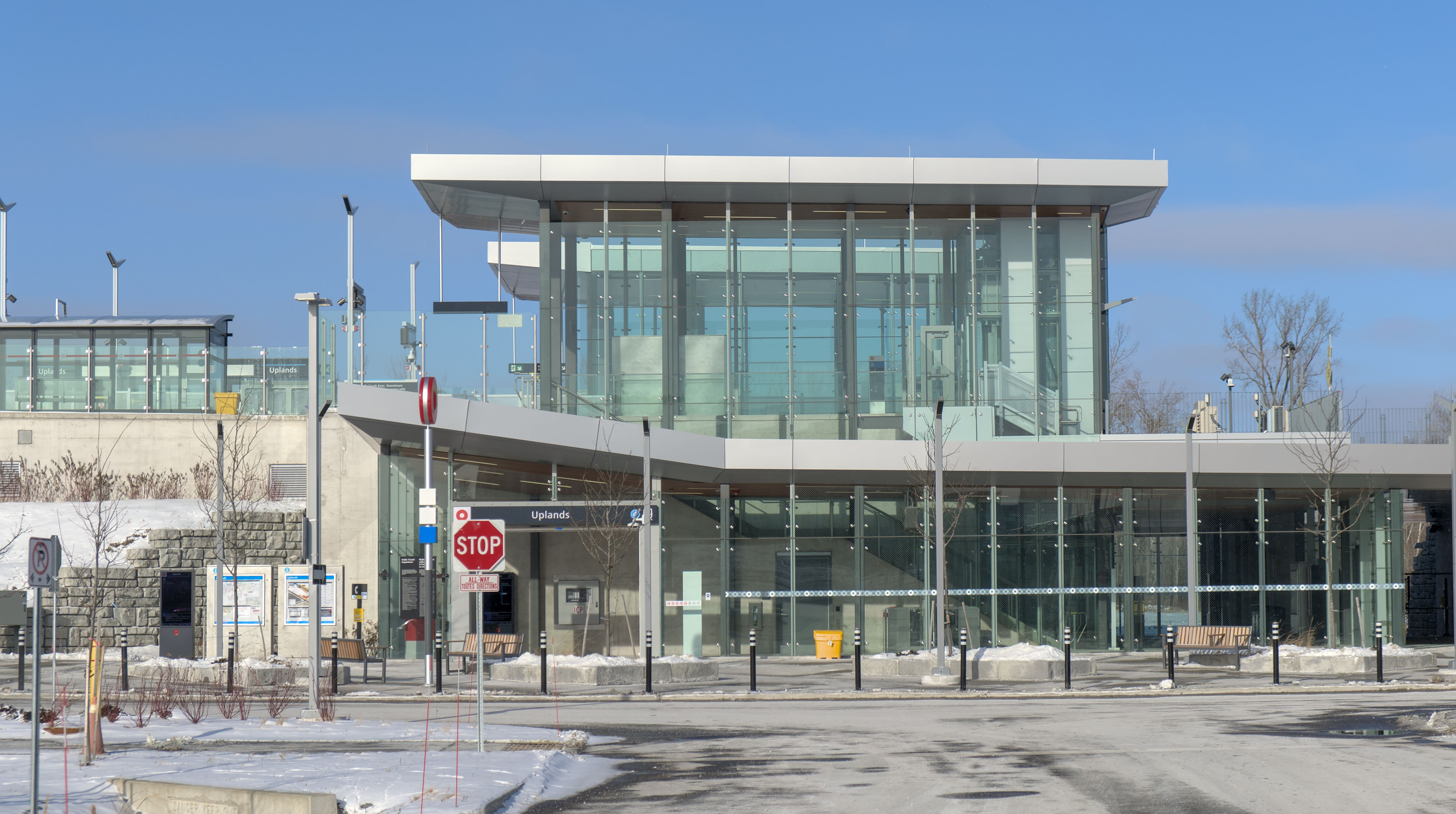

General information
- Coordinates: 45°20′00.2″N 75°39′25.7″W
- Owner: OC Transpo
- Platforms: Side platforms
- Tracks: 2

Construction
- Structure type: At-grade
- Accessible: Yes

History
- Opened: January 6, 2025

Services
Preceding station	OC Transpo	Following station
South Keys Terminus	Line 4	Airport Terminus
South Keys toward St-Laurent	Route 105	Airport Terminus
Location

Uplands station is a station on Line 4 of the O-Train system in Ottawa, Ontario. It was constructed as part of the Stage 2 O-Train expansion and opened on January 6, 2025.

The station has two side platforms and has the only passing loop on the line. It is located next to the EY Centre – a large convention centre.

== Service ==
The following routes service Uplands station:

Stop	Routes
North O-Train	Line 4 (O-Train)
South O-Train	Line 4 (O-Train)
A	105 197

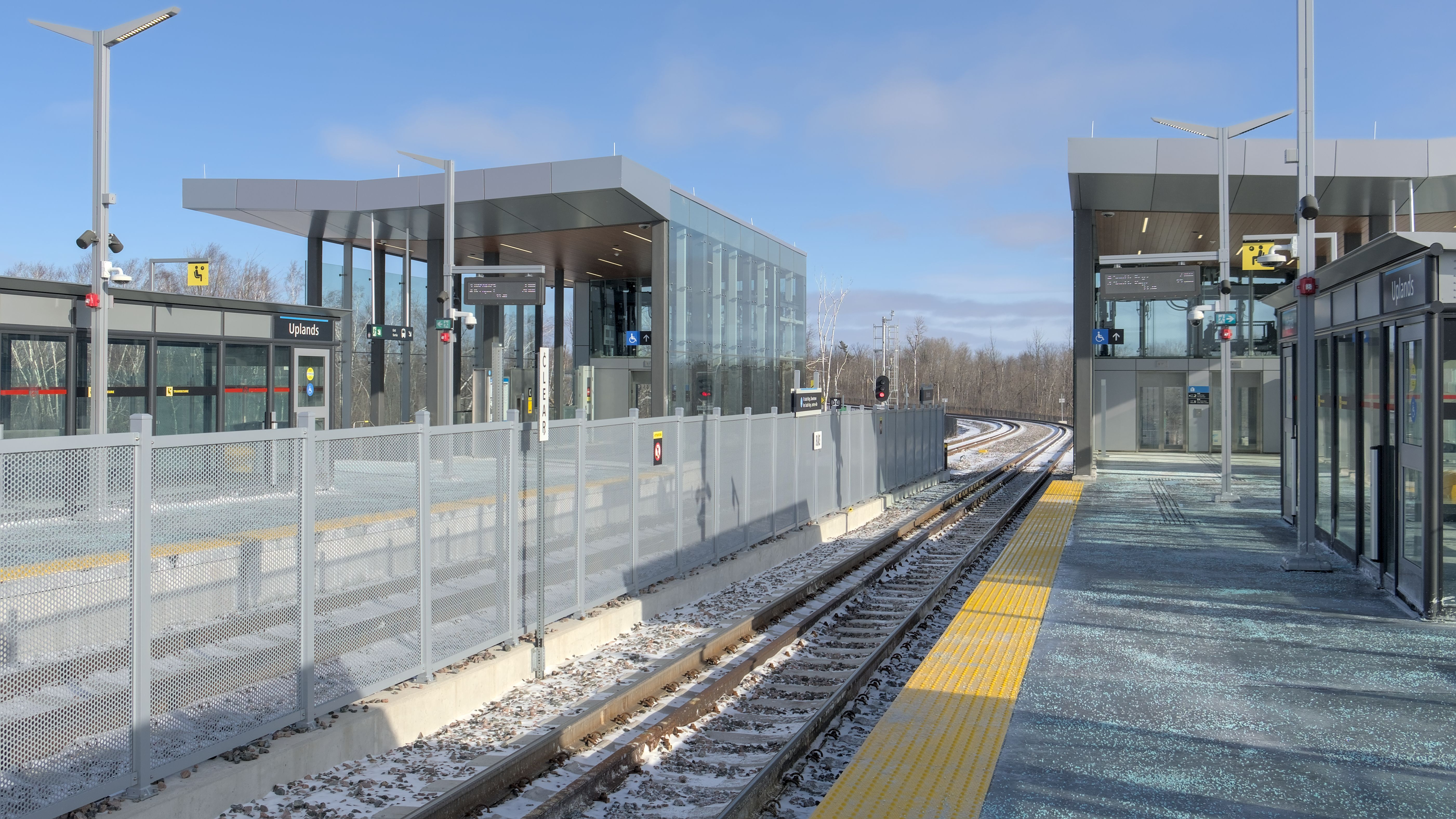
Line 4 platform
