= Airport station (Ottawa) =

Railway station in Ottawa, Ontario, Canada

Airport Aéroport
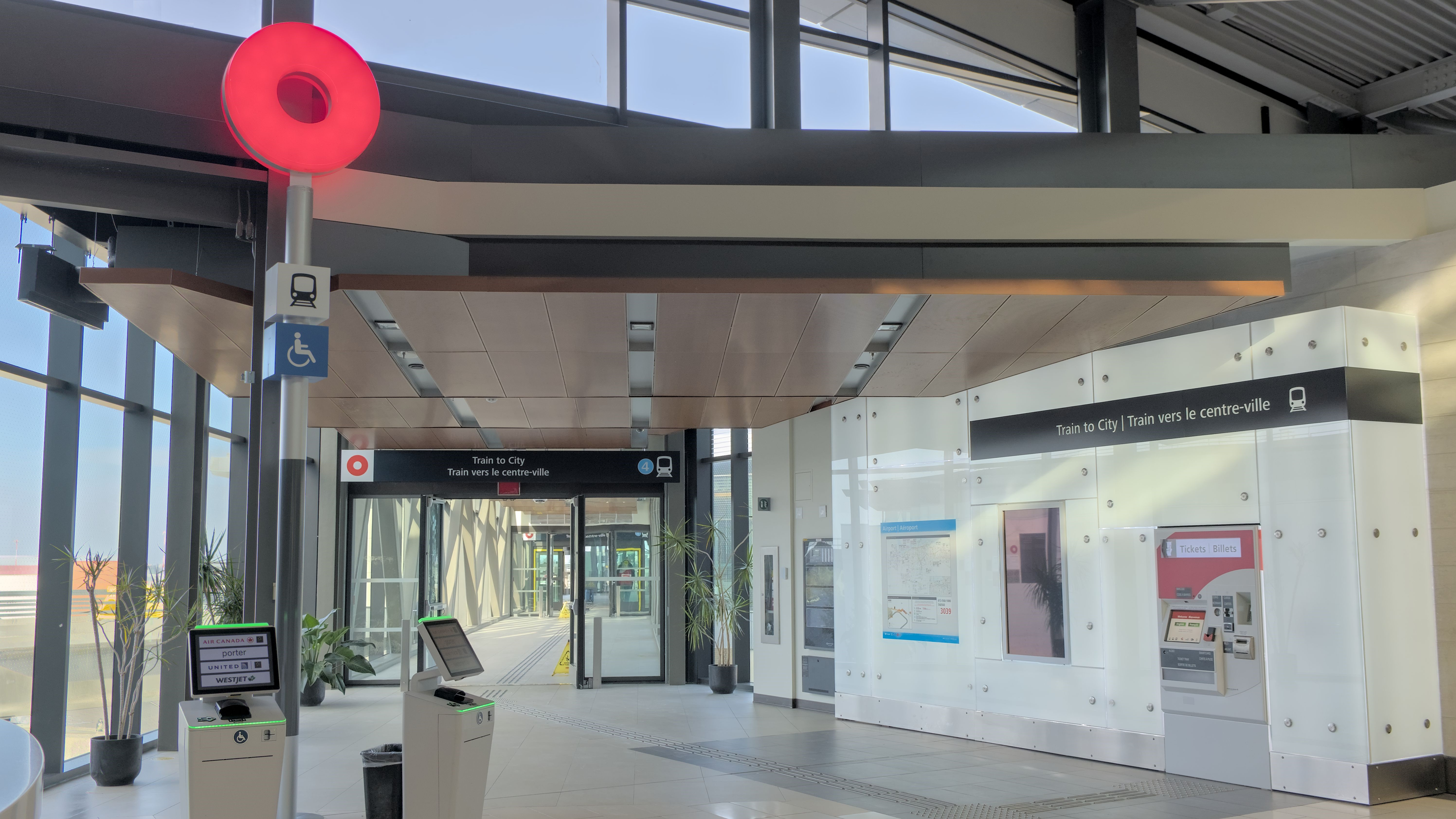
- The entrance to the station

General information
- Coordinates: 45°19′25.3″N 75°40′07.1″W
- Owner: OC Transpo
- Platforms: Single platform
- Tracks: 1

Construction
- Structure type: Elevated
- Accessible: Yes

History
- Opened: January 6, 2025

Services
Preceding station	OC Transpo	Following station
Uplands toward South Keys	Line 4	Terminus
Uplands toward St-Laurent	Route 105	Terminus
Former services
Preceding station	OC Transpo	Following station
South Keys toward Hurdman	Route 97 Closed April 2025	Terminus
Location

Airport station (French: Station Aéroport) is an O-Train rapid transit station. It is located at Ottawa Macdonald–Cartier International Airport in the south end of Ottawa. It serves as the southwestern terminus of the three-stop Line 4 which opened on January 6, 2025. The airport is also served by an OC Transpo bus stop.

== Service ==
Historically, Route 97 was the only bus that serviced the original stop. It was the southern terminus for this route. From Airport station, Route 97 continued northward and terminated at Hurdman station on the O-Train Line 1. In April 2025, Route 97 service to/from this station was replaced by Line 4 train service to/from South Keys station.

Route 105 (named after the Avro Canada CF-105 Arrow) supplements Line 4 service, connecting this station with Hurdman, Tremblay and St. Laurent stations. It also serves as a replacement for Line 4 when it is delayed or out of service.

At Hurdman, trains travel west to downtown Ottawa and east to Tremblay station (adjacent to Via Rail Ottawa station) before ending at the Blair station terminus.

The following routes provide service to the Airport:

Stop	Routes
North O-Train	Line 4 (O-Train)
A	105

== Gallery ==
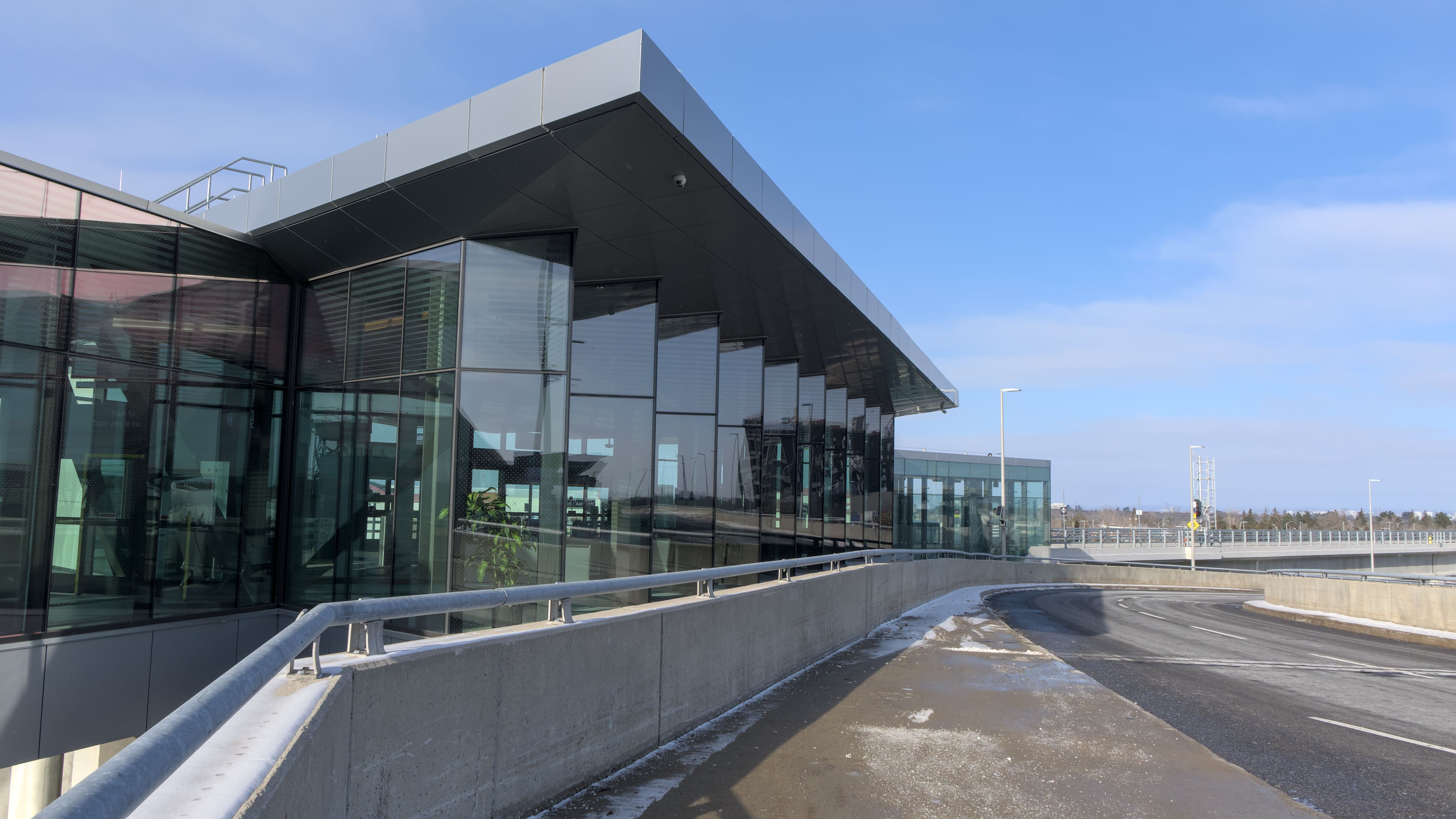
Exterior of station

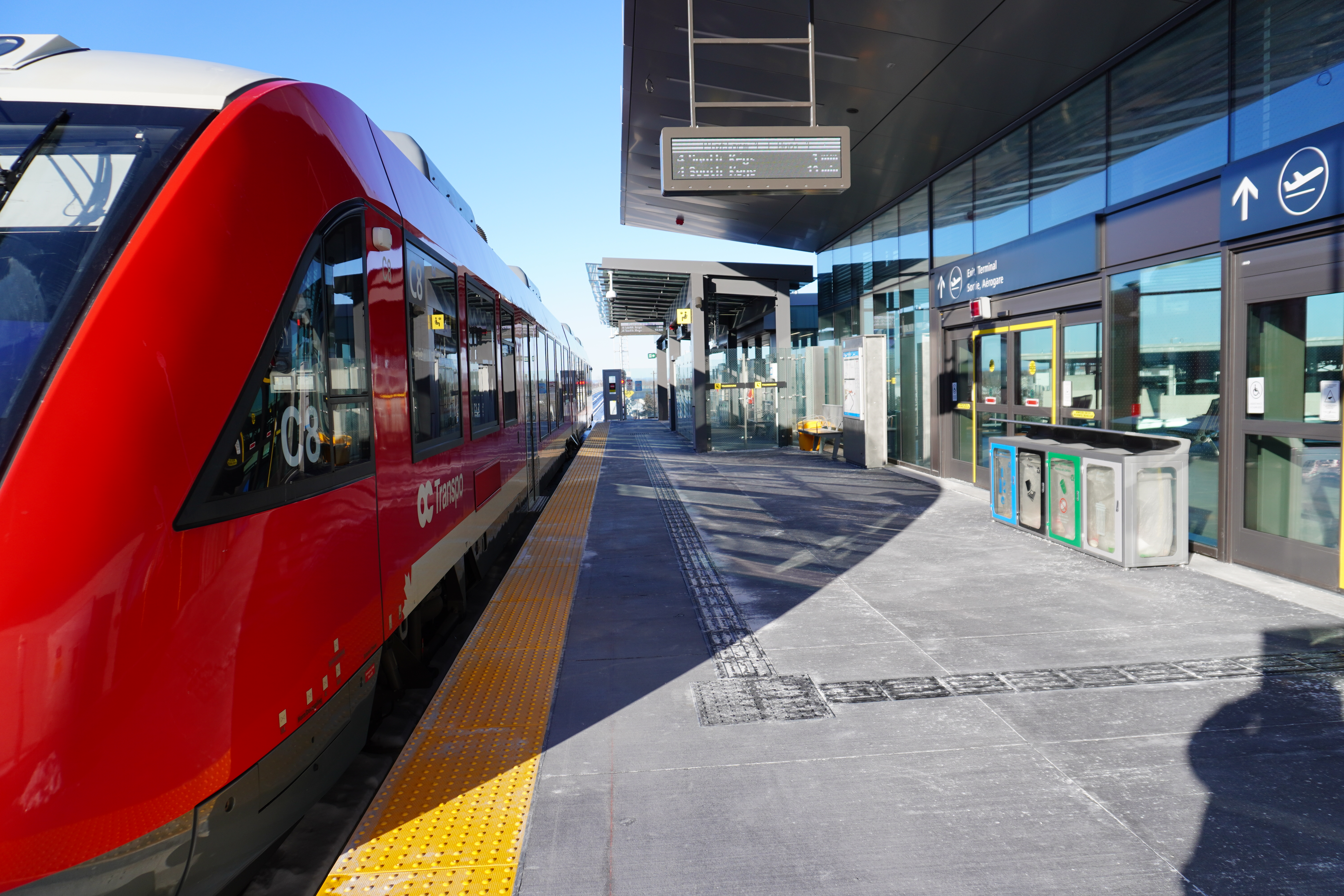
Rail platform

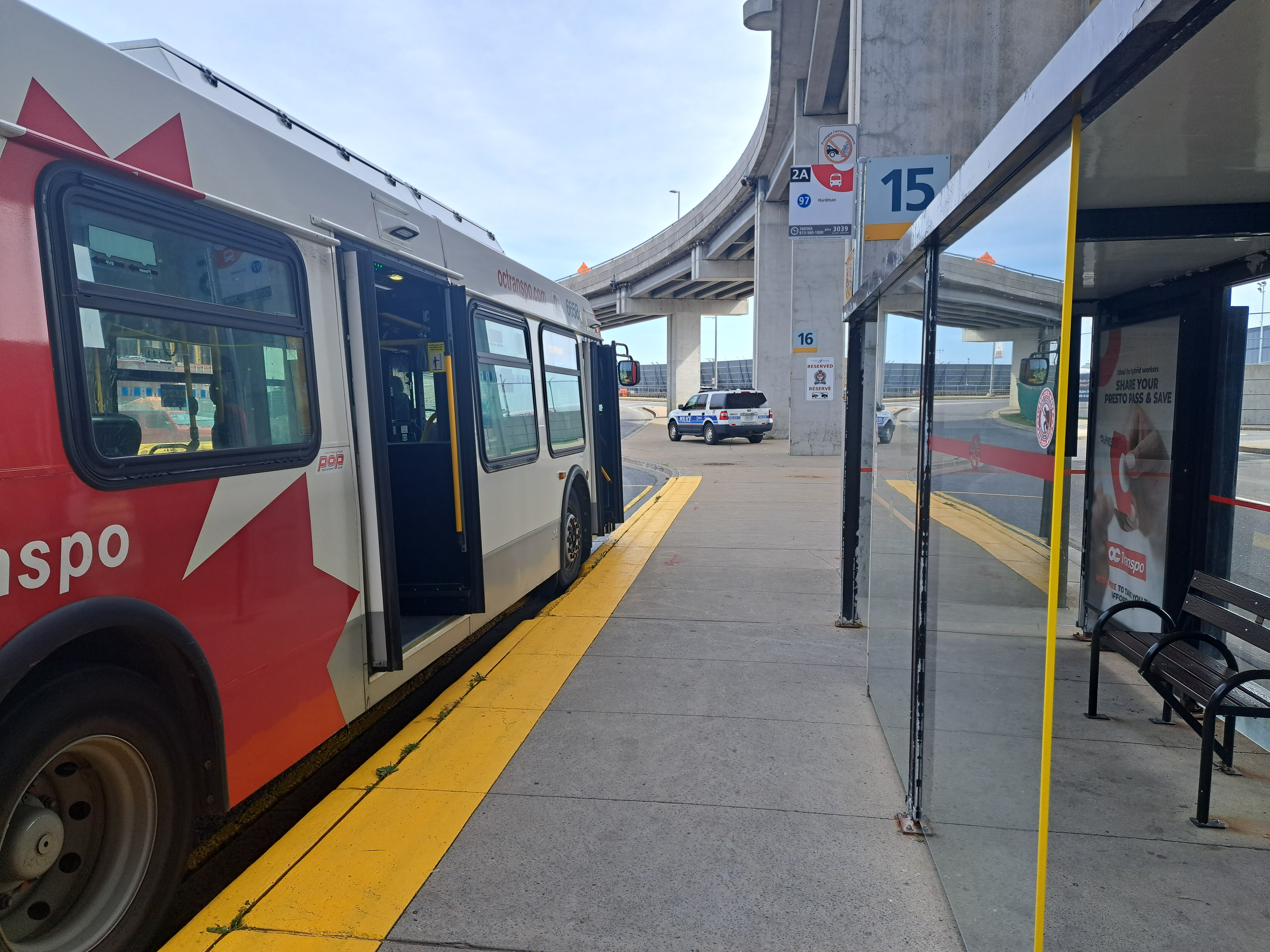
The bus stop outside the airport
