= Line 4 (O-Train) =

Diesel light rail line in Ottawa, Ontario

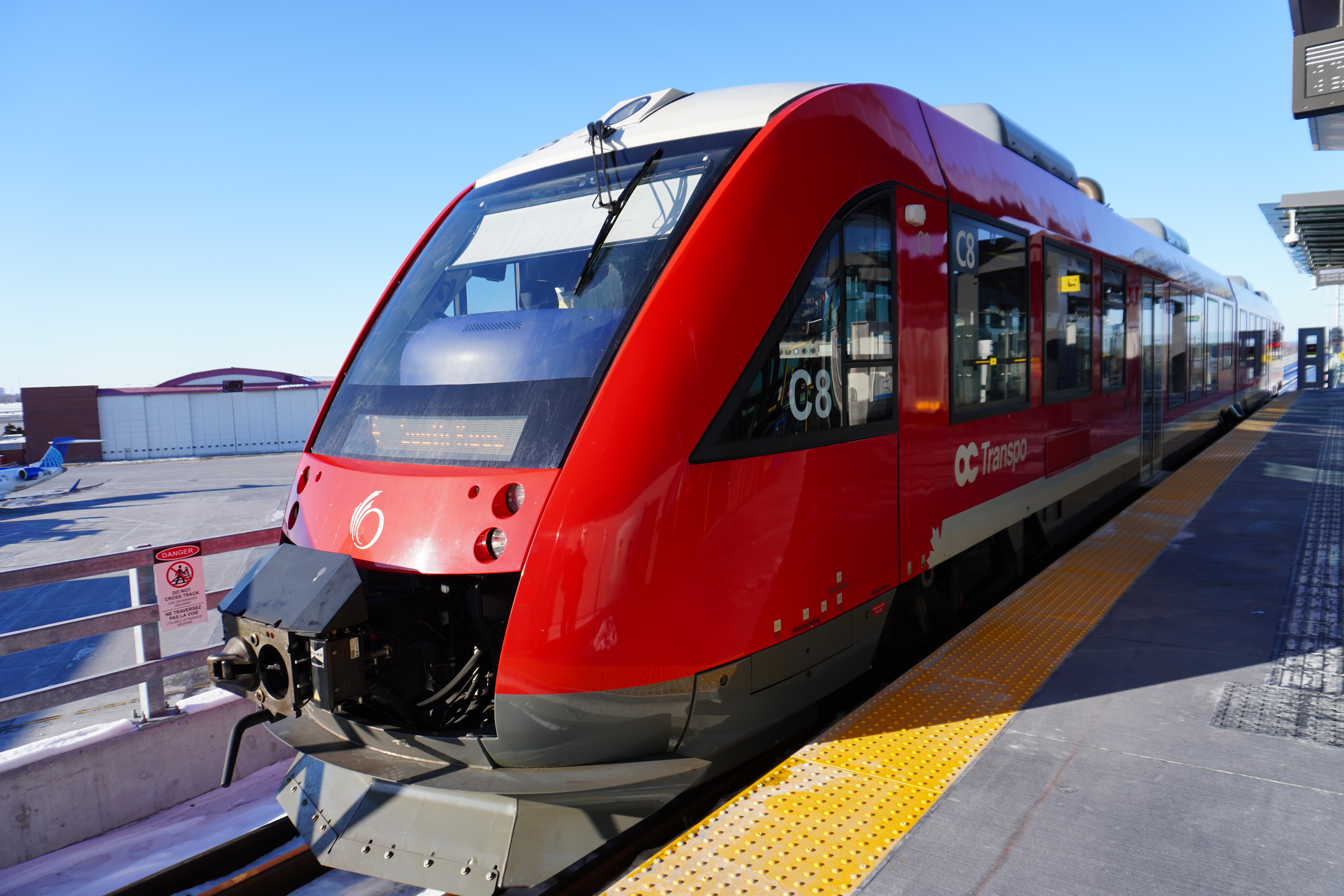
- Line 4 at Airport station

Overview
- Other name: Airport line
- Status: Open
- Owner: City of Ottawa
- Locale: Ottawa, Ontario
- Stations: 3
- Website: Line 4 (OC Transpo)

Service
- Type: Diesel light rail
- System: O-Train
- Rolling stock: Alstom Coradia LINT 41

History
- Opened: January 6, 2025; 20 months ago

Technical
- Line length: 4 km (2.5 mi)
- Track gauge: 1,435 mm (4 ft 8 1/2 in) standard gauge
- Operating speed: 50–80 km/h (31–50 mph)
Route map
Line 4 highlighted in blue

Line 4 (French: Ligne 4), also known as the Airport line, is a diesel light rail line on the O-Train network in Ottawa, Ontario. The line provides a connection between Line 2 (also known as the Trillium Line) at South Keys station, and Ottawa Macdonald–Cartier International Airport. The four-kilometre (2.5 mi) line opened on January 6, 2025.

== History ==
Initial plans for expansions of the Trillium Line in 2013 considered an expansion to Ottawa Macdonald–Cartier International Airport. However, these plans were discarded due to lack of funding and a focus on attracting ridership from the south of Ottawa. In 2016, the Ontario provincial government committed $1 billion to O-Train expansion, providing half the required funding for an extension to the airport, with an additional station at the EY Centre. Additional funding was acquired for the Airport Link through federal funding and the airport authority, who constructed the airport station for approximately $20 million, with $6.4 million from the federal government.

Construction of the line began in 2019. The line was initially considered to be part of the Trillium Line but was given its own number and colour in November 2020. Construction of Airport station was completed in 2023.

On January 6, 2025, Line 4 opened, the same day as Line 2's reopening. Line 4 began with a 5-day service week, expanding to a 6-day service week on January 25, and finally reached a 7-day service week on March 16.

== Stations ==
There are three stations on Line 4, with a connection to the Line 2 at South Keys station.

| Station | Notes |
|---|---|
| South Keys | The eastern terminus; this station provides an interchange with Line 2 in a fare-paid zone and access to the Transitway nearby. |
| Uplands | Located east of Uplands Drive next to the EY Centre and features two platforms. It is the location of the only passing loop on the line. |
| Airport | The western terminus; it is located at the Ottawa Macdonald–Cartier International Airport and built into the renovated and expanded terminal at the departures level. |

== Rolling stock ==
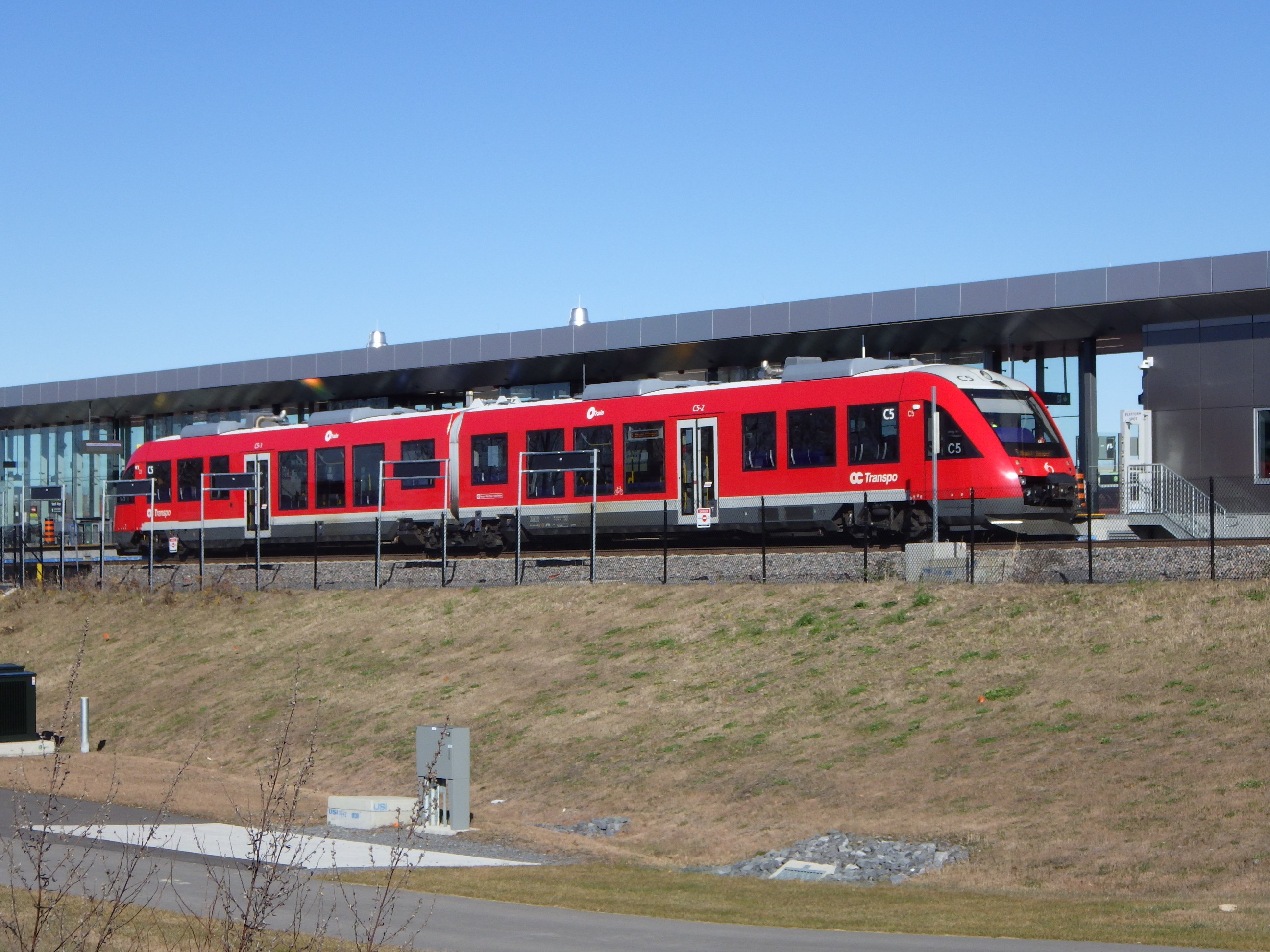
An Alstom Coradia LINT 41 train at South Keys station

The line uses Alstom Coradia LINT 41 diesel multiple units. Line 4 has 60-metre-long (200 ft) platforms, which are shorter than the 80-metre (260 ft) platforms on Line 2. The difference in length is due to the use of single-car trains instead of two-car vehicles, because of the line's lower projected ridership. The land and station construction at Uplands and Airport station have been reserved and protected for a potential future extension of the platforms, to accommodate 80-metre trains.
