= Carleton University =

Public university in Ottawa, Canada

- Coat of arms
- Motto: "Ours the Task Eternal"
- Type: Public university
- Established: 1942; 84 years ago
- Academic affiliations: ASAIHL; COU; IAU; UArctic; Universities Canada
- Endowment: C$401.2 million
- Budget: C$547 million
- Chancellor: Nik Nanos
- President: Wisdom Tettey
- Provost: L. Pauline Rankin
- Administrative staff: 5,328
- Students: 30,713
- Undergraduates: 25,119
- Postgraduates: 5,594
- Location: Ottawa, Ontario, Canada; 45.3831°N 75.6976°W
- Campus: Urban, 62 ha (150 acres)
- Newspaper: The Charlatan
Colours
Black, Red and White
- Nickname: Ravens
- Sporting affiliations: U Sports – OUA, RSEQ
- Mascot: Rodney the Raven
- Website: carleton.ca

Carleton University is an English-language public research university in Ottawa, Ontario, Canada. Founded in 1942 as Carleton College, the institution originally operated as a private, non-denominational evening college to serve returning World War II veterans. Carleton was chartered as a university by the provincial government in 1952 through The Carleton University Act, which was then amended in 1957, giving the institution its current name. The university is named after the now-dissolved Carleton County, which included the city of Ottawa at the time the university was founded.

Carleton is organized into five faculties with more than 65 degree programs. It has several specialized institutions, including the Arthur Kroeger College of Public Affairs, the Norman Paterson School of International Affairs, the Carleton School of Journalism, the School of Public Policy and Administration, and the Sprott School of Business.

As of 2025, Carleton yearly enrolls more than 25,000 undergraduate and 5,000 graduate students. Carleton has a 150-acre campus located west of Old Ottawa South, close to The Glebe and Confederation Heights. It is bounded to the North by the Rideau Canal and Dow's Lake and to the South by the Rideau River. Carleton has more than 188,000 alumni worldwide, including seven Rhodes Scholars, two Pulitzer Prize awardees, two Academy Award winners, eight Killam Prize winners, and several recipients of the Order of Canada. The university is affiliated with over 50 Royal Society Fellows and members and 3 Nobel laureates. Carleton is also home to 27 Canada Research Chairs, one Canada 150 Chair, 14 IEEE Fellows and 11 3M National Teaching Award winners.

Carleton competes in the U Sports league as the Carleton Ravens. The Carleton Ravens men's basketball team has won 18 W. P. McGee Trophy national championships in the sport.

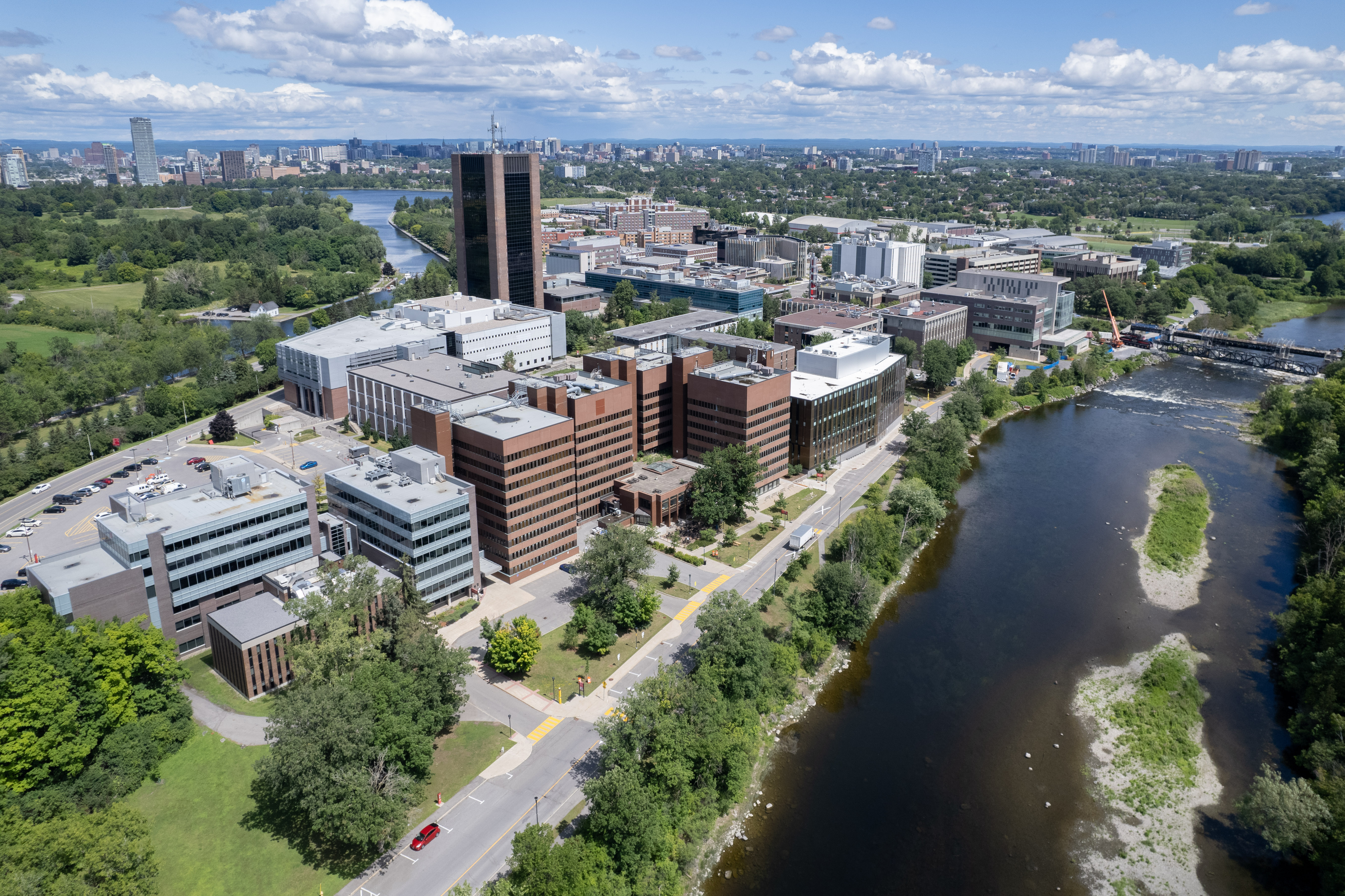
Carleton University campus in 2022

== History ==
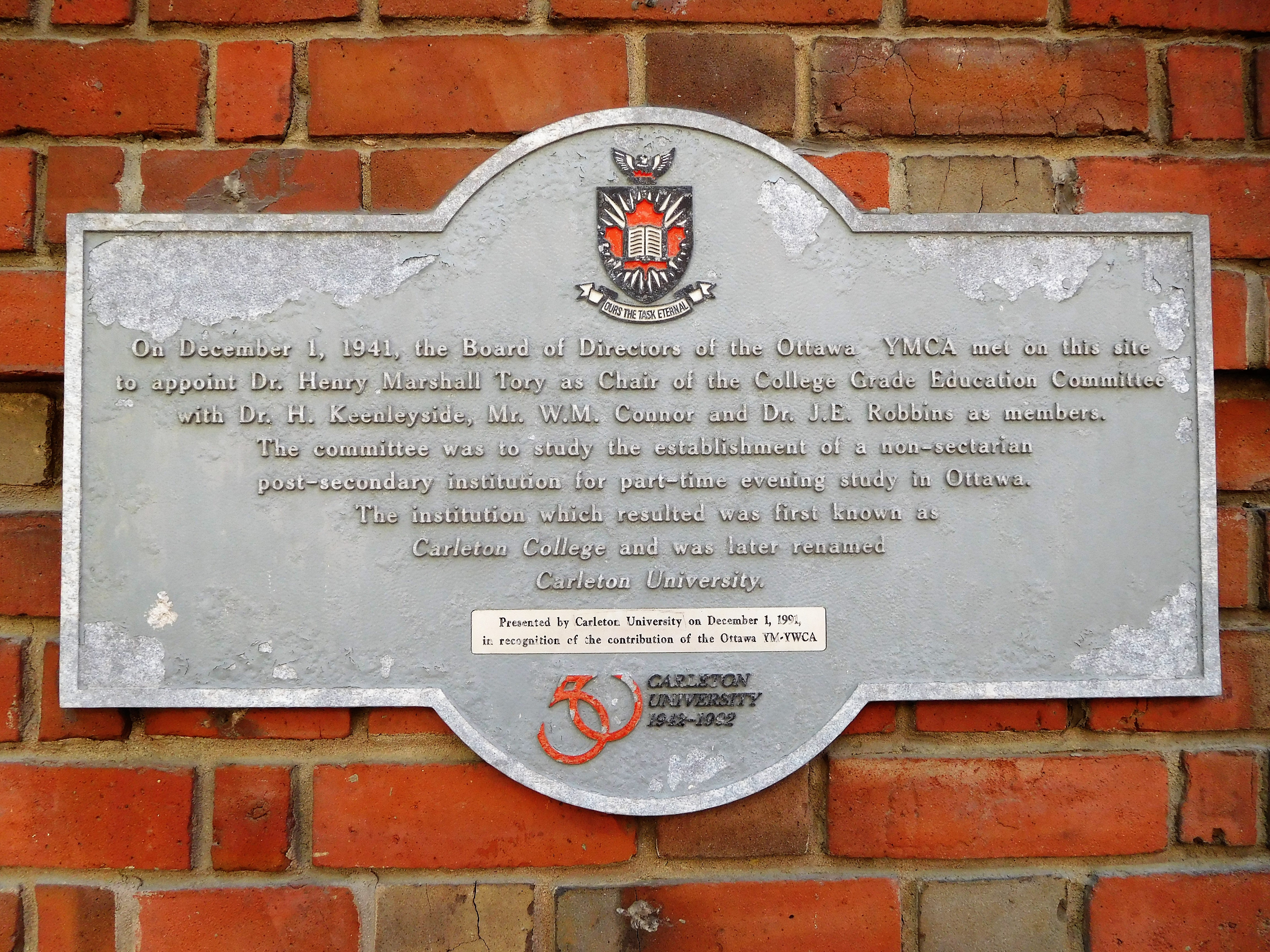
Historical plaque commemorating the inaugural meeting of the Ottawa Association for the Advancement of Learning in December 1941

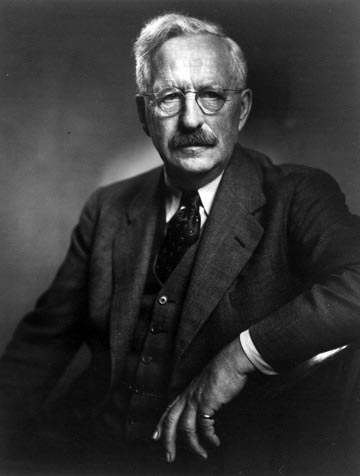
Henry Marshall Tory, first President of Carleton College

=== Carleton College (1942–1957) ===
Discussions on establishing a second post-secondary institution in Ottawa began in the fall of 1938 among a committee of members from the local YMCA chapter, to create a school accommodating the needs of Ottawa's non-Catholic population. While the Second World War ended the committee's activities, a new committee was organized by Henry Marshall Tory as the Ottawa Association for the Advancement of Learning at a meeting held in December 1941, with formal incorporation in June 1942.

Established in 1942 as Carleton College, a non-denominational institution, the school began offering evening courses in rented classrooms at the High School of Commerce, now part of the Glebe Collegiate Institute. Classes offered during the first academic year included English, French, history, algebra, trigonometry, chemistry, physics, and biology. With the end of the war in 1945 and return of veterans from the frontlines, the college experienced an upsurge in student enrolment during the 1945–46 academic year, accepting 2,200 new students.

To accommodate them, the school rented facilities in various buildings throughout the city, including classrooms at the Lisgar Collegiate Institute, Ottawa Technical High School, and the basements of several local churches. The academic offerings expanded with the establishment of the Faculty of Arts and Science, and new coursework in journalism and engineering.

In 1946, the college opened its first campus at the corner of Lyon Street and First Avenue in The Glebe neighbourhood. The four-story building was the former location of the Ottawa Ladies' College, which was purchased during the Second World War for use as barracks for the Canadian Women's Army Corps. Carleton's first degrees were conferred in 1946 to graduates of its Journalism and Public Administration programs.

For nearly a decade, the college operated on a shoestring budget, using funds raised mainly through community initiatives and student fees. Fees during the school's first academic year from 1942 to 43 were about $10.00 per course for first-year students, equivalent to $197 in 2025 dollars. Fundraising efforts by the college's president, Henry Marshall Tory, raised $1 million from donors throughout the Ottawa area, with half of the proceeds going towards the purchase of the new building, and the other to endow the college. Carleton's faculty was composed largely of part-time professors who worked in the public service, some of whom eventually left the government for full-time tenure positions.

In 1952, the Carleton College Act was passed by the Ontario Legislature, changing the school's corporate name to Carleton College and conferring upon it the power to grant university degrees. Carleton thus became the province's first private, non-sectarian college. The governance system was modelled on the provincial University of Toronto Act of 1906 which established a bicameral system of university government consisting of a Faculty Senate, responsible for academic policy, and a Board of Governors composed of local community members, exercising exclusive control over the institution's finances and formal authority over all other matters. The President, appointed by the Board, was to provide a link between the two bodies and to perform institutional leadership.

Though the acquisition of land tracts now part of the current campus began in 1947, it was only in 1952 that the college gained possession of the entire 150-acre property, a significant portion of which was donated by Harry Stevenson Southam, a prominent Ottawa business magnate. In March 1956, the college released a 75-year master plan for the development of the campus in stages, with the first stage costing an estimated $4.2 million, equivalent to $49.7 million in 2025 dollars, foreseeing the development of academic buildings, student residences, and athletic facilities on the new site.

In October 1956, the beginning of construction at the Rideau River campus was celebrated with a ceremonial sod-turning by Dana Porter, then Treasurer of Ontario.

=== Carleton University (1957–present) ===
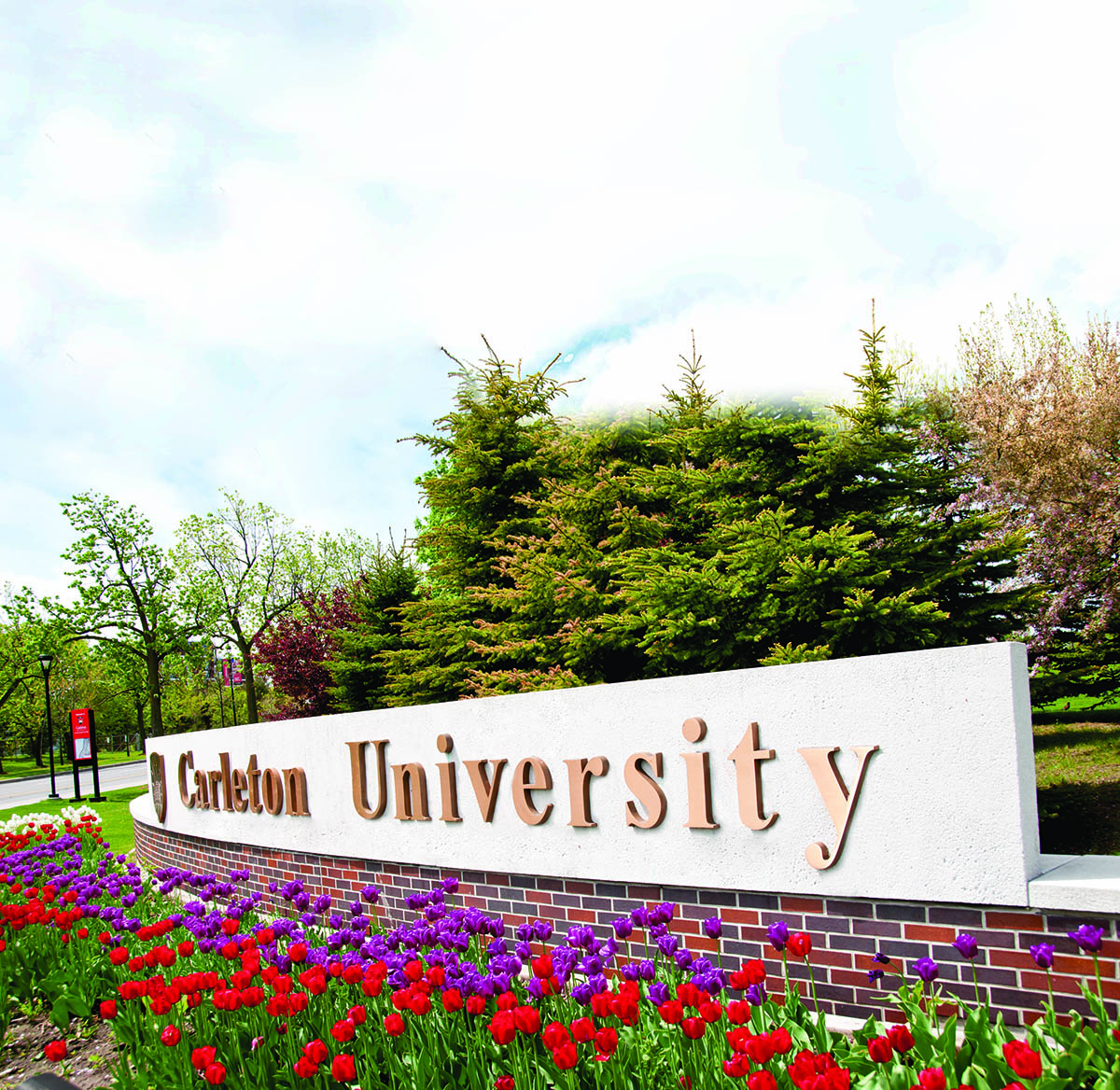
Bronson entrance

In 1957, the Carleton University Act was enacted as an amendment to the Carleton College Act, granting Carleton nominal status as a public university and resulting in its current name, Carleton University. This did not result in substantive changes to the school's governance and academic organization as it had already been granted university powers through the existing legislation.

==== Rapid development and growth (1960–1969) ====
The completion of initial construction at the Rideau River campus in 1959 saw the university move to its current location at the beginning of the 1959–60 academic year. Completed at a cost of $6.5 million, the first three buildings, the Maxwell MacOdrum Library, Norman Paterson Hall and the Henry Marshall Tory Building became the centre for academic life at Carleton, with Paterson Hall and Tory Building respectively serving the arts and sciences disciplines.

The 1960s saw meteoric growth in student enrolment, with the number of full-time students ballooning from 857 to 7,139 within the decade, which coincided with a sharp uptick in financial support from the provincial and federal governments towards post-secondary institutions.

An increasing share of these students came to the school from outside the National Capital Region, prompting the university to open its first purpose-built residence halls, Lanark and Renfrew Houses in the fall of 1962. The residences were initially segregated by sex, with Lanark House reserved for male students and Renfrew for female students. However, Carleton did away with the practice of mandatory sex segregation in 1969 in favour of co-educational housing, becoming the first university in North America to adopt this practice. By the end of the decade, the increased need for space to accommodate the growing faculty and student body saw the completion of several major academic buildings, including the Loeb Building in 1967 and the Mackenzie Building in 1968.

In 1967, a Catholic liberal arts college, Saint Patrick's College, became affiliated with Carleton. Saint Patrick's College was founded by the Missionary Oblates of Mary Immaculate to meet the higher educational needs of Ottawa's growing English-speaking Catholic population. Originally housed in a separate building Old Ottawa East, now the campus of Immaculata High School, a new building for the school was erected on the north end of the Carleton campus in 1973.

==== Steady expansion (1970–1999) ====
The arrival of a new decade ushered in the inauguration of the long-awaited Nideyinàn (formerly University Centre), designed to be the linchpin for student life on campus, housing a student-operated pub and other administrative services. With growing restrictions in physical space, the university hailed the completion of Dunton Tower, then referred to as the Arts Tower, in September 1972, which was the then-tallest academic building in Canada.

Rising attention towards recreation and fitness, coupled with generous grants from the provincial government, spurred the construction of the Athletics Centre in 1974, housing a multiplicity of different sports facilities, including a pool, squash courts, and gymnasium.

In 1979, Saint Patrick's College was dissolved and merged into Carleton with Gerald Clarke, a professor at the school since 1954, serving as its final Dean. While Carleton is a secular institution, the name of the St. Patrick's Building was kept as a nod to Carleton's historical relationship to the Catholic institution.

Although Carleton experienced a temporary decline in student enrolment toward the latter half of the 1970s, the 1980s saw a resurgence in the number of students attending the school, representing an increase of 76%, or 5,582 students over the course of the decade, leading to overcrowding in many of the school's buildings. Responding to the demands of a larger student population during the 1980s, the university built the Life Sciences Research Centre, the Minto Centre of Advanced Studies in Engineering (CASE), and funded an extension to MacOdrum Library.

Following renovations led by Toronto-based architect Michael Lundholm, 1992 saw the opening of the Carleton University Art Gallery in the St. Patrick's Building, supported by a fundraising drive within the local community and the bequest of several pieces of Canadian art from the estate of Frances and Jack Barwick. In fall 1994, a new computing system was introduced at Carleton, extending Internet and e-mail access to all students and faculty, where this had previously been only accessible to graduate and undergraduate students in specific courses.

==== Contemporary developments (2000–present) ====
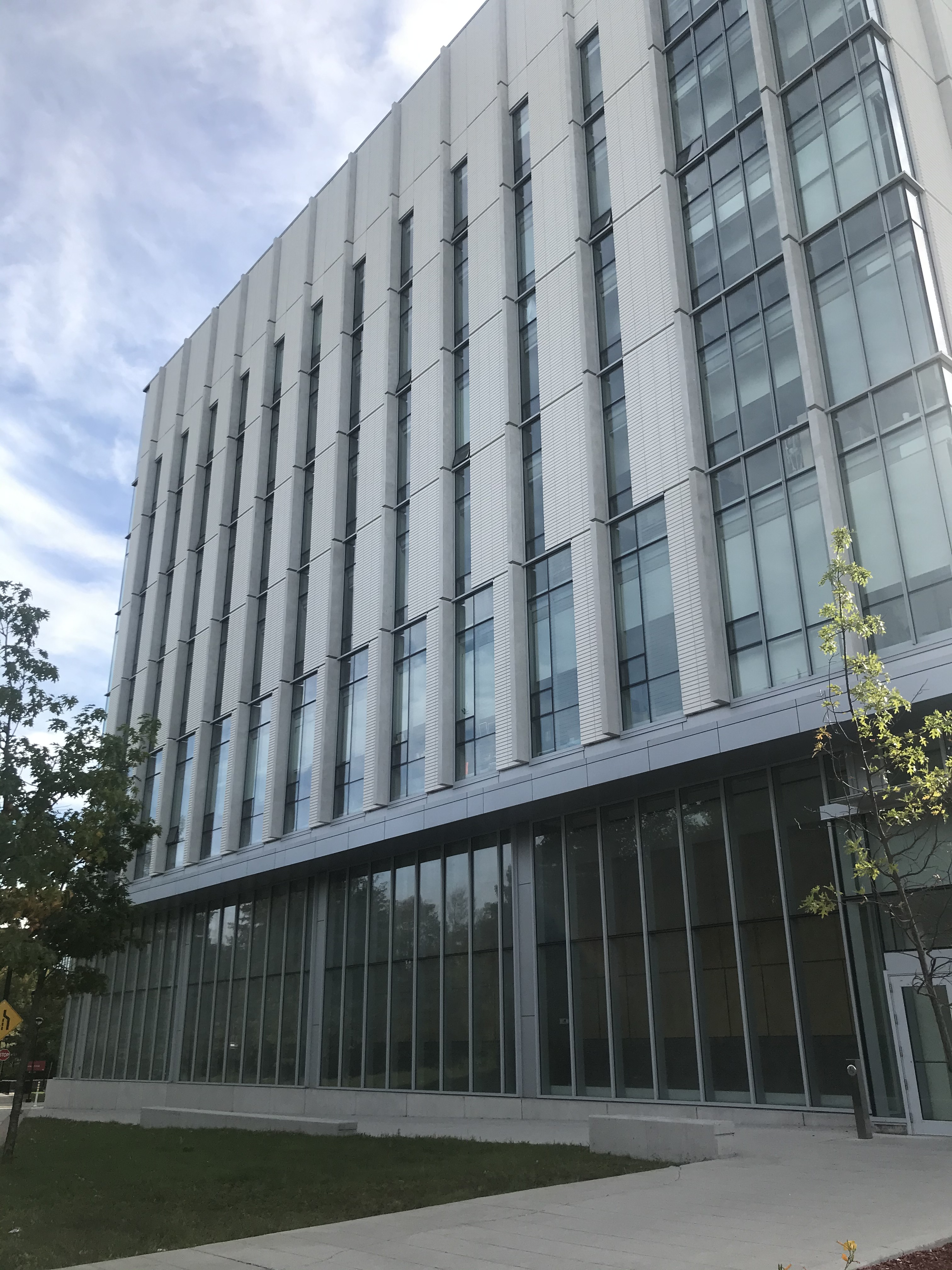
Health Sciences Building, completed in 2019

The new millennium brightened prospects for Carleton's finances, allowing it to fund the construction of several new buildings during the 2000s. These include, inter alia, the $30-million construction of new athletics facilities, the $22-million, 9,011 m^{2} (97,000 ft^{2}) Human Computer Interaction (HCI) Institute Facility and Centre for Advanced Studies in Visualization and Simulation (V-SIM), and the $17-million upgrade and expansion to Nideyinàn. In 2008, a sustainably-designed residence hall was added named Frontenac House, primarily serving returning second-year students. During this decade, Carleton inaugurated its first female President and Vice Chancellor, Roseann Runte in 2008, who served in this position until 2017, resigning to fulfill a new position as president and CEO of the Canada Foundation for Innovation. Runte's leadership also pushed forward the planning and construction of three new academic buildings, Canal Building (2010), and River Building (2011; renamed Richcraft Hall in 2016), and the Health Sciences Building (2018), as well as a new residence building, Lennox and Addington House in 2011.

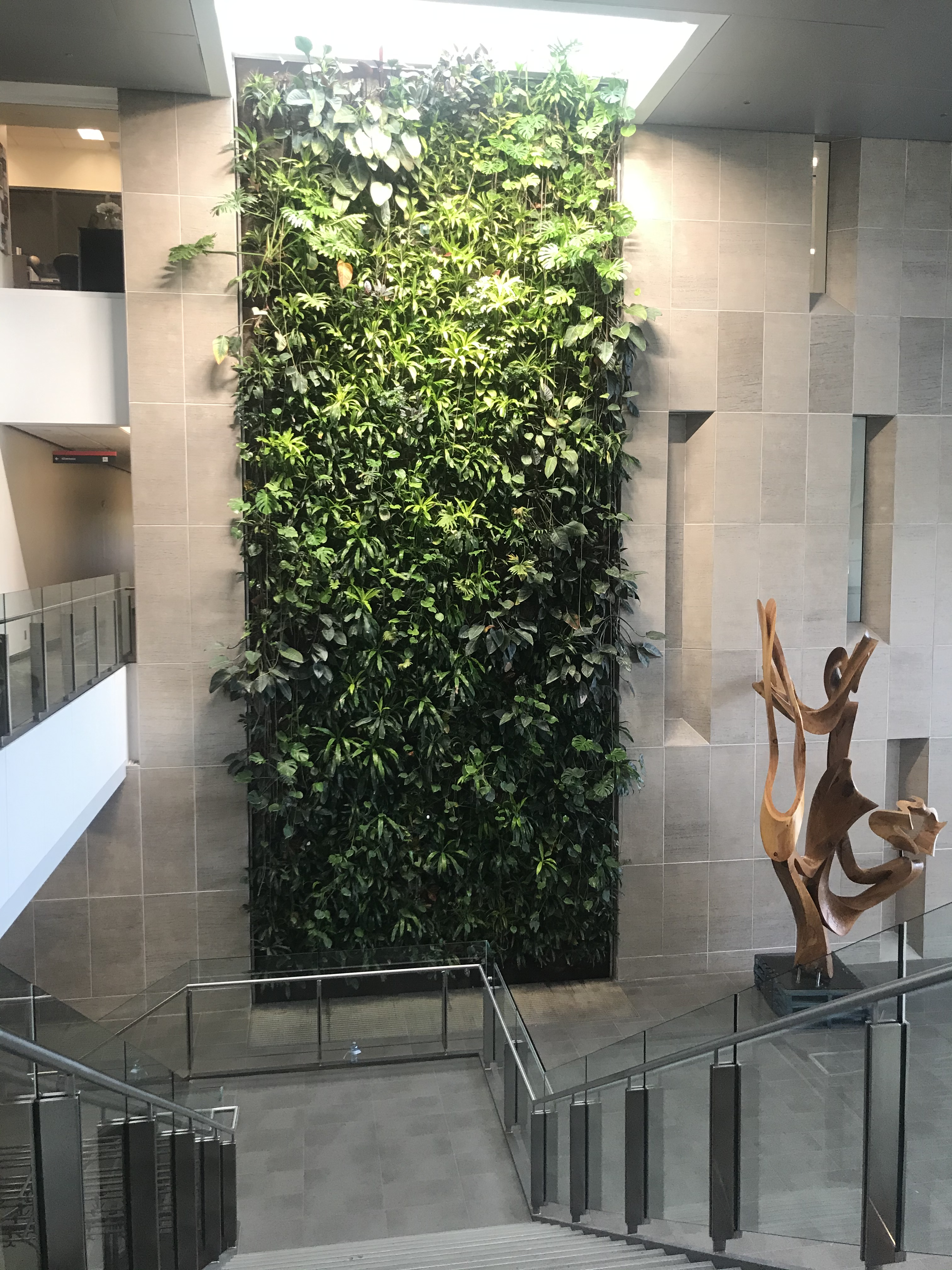
Green wall installed in Richcraft Hall

At the behest of Runte's successor, Benoit-Antoine Bacon, Carleton has continued to pursue several major construction projects, notably the Advanced Research and Innovation and Smart Environments (ARISE) Building, replacing the existing Life Sciences Building, to house applied research in smart technology.

In 2018, Carleton purchased the Dominion-Chalmers United Church located in Ottawa's Centretown neighbourhood to serve as a community and cultural hub, and host to artistic performances and academic lectures. The facility represents Carleton's first building situated in Ottawa's downtown area.

In 2021, Carleton completed construction on the Nicol Building, the new home of the Sprott School of Business. Located in the heart of Carleton's campus, the Nicol Building was designed by Hariri Pontarini Architects and provides 115,000 square feet of new, collaborative learning space. The cost of the building was estimated at $65 million, but was offset through a sizeable donation of $10 million from the late Ottawa real estate developer Wes Nicol, for whom the building is namesake.

In 2025, the construction of Rideau House was completed, built to meet the increasing demand for on-campus housing. This marked Carleton's first new residence building since Lennox and Addington House in 2011. Rideau House provides numerous amenities to all campus residents, including a fitness centre, community kitchen, and games room.

== Organization and administration ==
=== Governance ===
The university's governing framework is established through the Carleton University Act, 1952, enabling legislation which sets out the basic legal obligations and purposes of the institution. The Act establishes Carleton as a bicameral institution, governed by a Board of Governors and Senate. The Act establishes the objects and purpose of the university as the advancement of learning; the dissemination of knowledge; the intellectual, social, and moral development of its members and the community at large; and the establishment of a non-sectarian institution within the City of Ottawa.

==== Board of Governors ====
The Board of Governors oversees the corporate affairs of the institution, including finances, real property, risk management, and strategic direction. The Board is also responsible for appointing the President and Chancellor, and determines the compensation of staff, faculty, and members of the senior administration. The Board of Governors is composed of 36 members, with 18 members derived from the students, staff, and administration of Carleton. These include four students, two faculty members, two members of the University Senate, two alumni, two staff, as well as the President and Chancellor, who are ex-officio members of the Board. The remainder of the representatives are selected from the local community at large.

To support its mandate and oversight function, the Board has six standing committees, with each Governor holding membership in one or two of these committees over the course of a year. These standing committees include Executive, Audit & Risk, Building Program, Advancement and University Relations, Governance, and Finance.

The Board is led by the board chair, who presides over meetings, evaluates executive performance, advises senior administration, and represents the university's interests to government. The current board chair is Beth Creary, former Senior Vice-President, Legal & Compliance at Ligado Networks.

==== Senate ====
The Senate comprises 86 members, including 40 faculty members, two contract instructors, 10 undergraduate students, three graduate students, 23 ex-officio members, four members of the Board of Governors, and up to four special appointments.

=== Finances ===
For the 2023–24 academic year, Carleton reported a proposed budget of $525 million.

The largest annual sources of revenue for Carleton are tuition fees, which generate 50% of the university's income, representing $336 million in earnings, and provincial government funding, representing 26% of the university's income, or $174 million.

In 2023–24, Carleton received $111.5 million in sponsored research funding.

Carleton has an endowment fund of $353 million as of April 2021, with an increase of $54.4 million over the previous year.

== Academics ==
Carleton is a mid-sized comprehensive and research-intensive public university, and is part of several pan-institutional bodies, including Universities Canada and the Association of Commonwealth Universities. As of the 2020–21 academic year, Carleton received 23,544 applications, producing a first-year cohort of 6,227 In 2023, the school reported an enrolment of 30,760 students, comprising 25722 undergraduate and 5,038 graduate students, supported by 1062 faculty members and 861 contract instructors. Carleton's graduation rate within seven years is approximately 70.4% as of the 2017–18 academic year, with a graduate employment rate of 92.7% within two years of graduation. Among Carleton graduates, 87.7% are employed in a field related to their degrees.

Faculties of Carleton University
Faculties	Established
Faculty of Arts & Social Science	1997
Faculty of Engineering & Design	1963
Faculty of Public and Global Affairs	1997
Faculty of Science	1963
Sprott School of Business	2006

=== Academic units ===
==== Arts and Social Sciences ====
The Faculty of Arts and Social Sciences (FASS) offers 27 majors and 16 minors leading to the Bachelor of Arts (BA), Bachelor of Arts (Honours), Bachelor of Arts (Combined Honours), Bachelor of Cognitive Science (B.Cog.Sci.), Bachelor of Global and International Studies (B.GINS) degrees, and Bachelor of Humanities (B.Hum.) degrees. The faculty oversees a variety of disciplines in the humanities and social science fields, including African studies, anthropology, English, French, geography, history, music, psychology, and sociology.

The Faculty also houses the College of the Humanities, one of Canada's few Great Books programs, which leads to a B.Hum (Bachelor of Humanities) degree, and Carleton's Institute of Cognitive Science, which offers the only fully structured PhD program in Cognitive Science in the country, as well as undergraduate and masters programs. There is also a collaborative M.A. in Digital humanities, one of the first in Canada. The Public History Program is known nationally for its innovative teaching and research, having recently won national prizes. FASS offers, in total, 14 master's and nine doctoral programs.

==== Engineering and Design ====
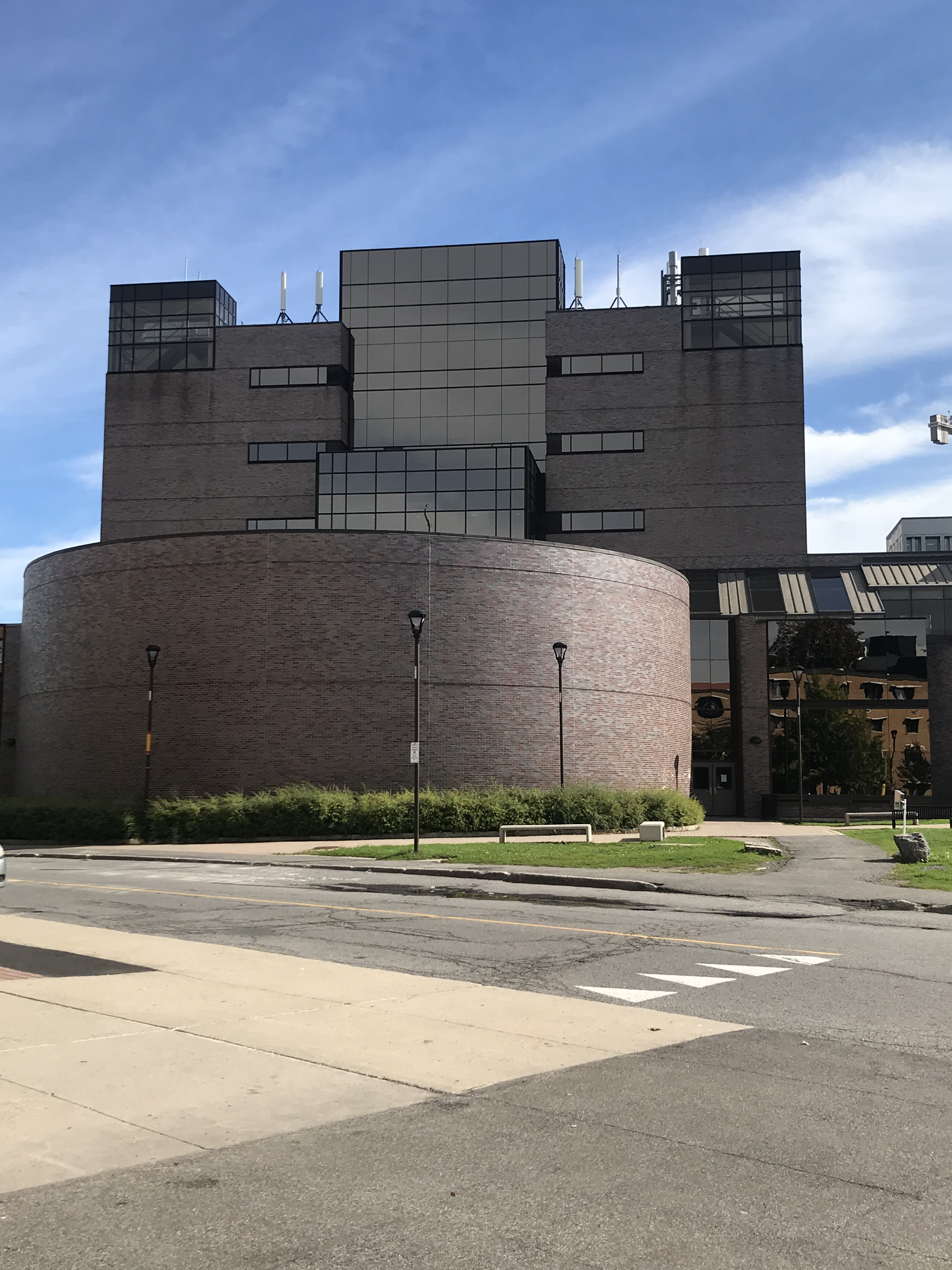
Minto Centre for Advanced Studies in Engineering (CASE), one of several buildings housing departments in the Faculty of Engineering and Design

The Faculty of Engineering and Design is among the oldest within the university, with the first engineering courses offered in 1945, and four-year engineering degrees being offered by the school beginning in 1956. The Faculty of Engineering and Design has since developed a broad range of coursework in the fields of engineering, architecture, industrial design, and information technology housing 20 distinct undergraduate programs under the Bachelor of Engineering (BEng), Bachelor of Architectural Studies (BAS), Bachelor of Industrial Design (BID), Bachelor of Information Technology (BIT), and Bachelor of Media Production and Design (BMPD), along with 37 graduate programs at the master's and PhD level. As of the fall 2019 semester, more than 5,800 undergraduate and 1,200 graduate students are enrolled in the Faculty.

The Faculty also houses one of Canada's first undergraduate programs focusing on aerospace engineering, and is considered to be one of the flagship offerings of the Faculty and the university at large. The program itself divides students into four streams, enabling students to specialize in a particular field within the broader spectrum of aerospace engineering. This includes Stream A: aerodynamics, propulsion, and vehicle performance, Stream B: aerospace structures, systems and vehicle design, Stream C: aerospace electronics and systems, and Stream D: space systems design.

Within the faculty the Azrieli School of Architecture and Urbanism houses undergraduate and graduate programs in the field of Architecture. Students in the Bachelor of Architectural Studies can specialize one of three areas: Design, Urbanism, and Conversation and Sustainability.

Carleton's Bachelor of Information Technology programs are offered jointly with Algonquin College, while the university's Bachelor of Media Production and Design is offered jointly between the School of Information Technology and the Faculty of Public and Global Affairs’ School of Journalism and Communication.

==== Public Affairs ====
The Faculty of Public and Global Affairs, formerly the Faculty of Public Affairs, houses the university's academic disciplines that deal directly with government, civil society, and the relationship between them, comprising twelve academic units, offering 12 undergraduate programs and 21 graduate programs in criminology, economics, European studies, legal studies, journalism, political science, and public policy. In 2024, the Faculty of Public Affairs officially changed its name to the Faculty of Public and Global Affairs. The new name captures the global nature of its programs and the work of its researchers, students and alumni.

Many of Carleton's flagship offerings are housed in the Faculty of Public and Global Affairs. This includes the School of Journalism and Communication, which offers the university's Bachelor of Journalism and Master of Journalism programs. The Norman Paterson School of International Affairs (NPSIA), which houses Canada's oldest foreign affairs graduate program. NPSIA, founded in 1965, is a member of the Association of Professional Schools of International Affairs (APSIA). The School of Public Policy and Administration is the oldest such academic division in Canada and one of the most respected, with the university's first graduate degree in the discipline being granted in 1946. Carleton's Arthur Kroeger College of Public Affairs offers two unique honours degrees: the Bachelor of Public Affairs and Policy Management (BPAPM) and the multidisciplinary Bachelor of Global and International Studies (BGInS). The college is also home to the Clayton H. Riddell Graduate Program in Political Management.

In September 2006, Carleton was designated a European Union Centre of Excellence by the European Commission in Brussels and was the first university to offer a BA (Honours) in European and Russian Studies and MA in European, Russian and Eurasian Studies. Its Department of Law & Legal Studies offers a BA (Honours) in Law and M.A and Ph.D. programs in Legal Studies, and is Canada's oldest legal department to take an epistemic, rather than professional approach to studying the influence of law within civil society. The faculty also features the Institute of Political Economy, the Institute of Criminology and Criminal Justice and African Studies, and is home to the School of Social Work and Department of Economics.

In 2019, Carleton ranked 101–150 in the world for politics and international studies, placing it within the top one per cent of global universities in this field.

===== Norman Paterson School of International Affairs =====
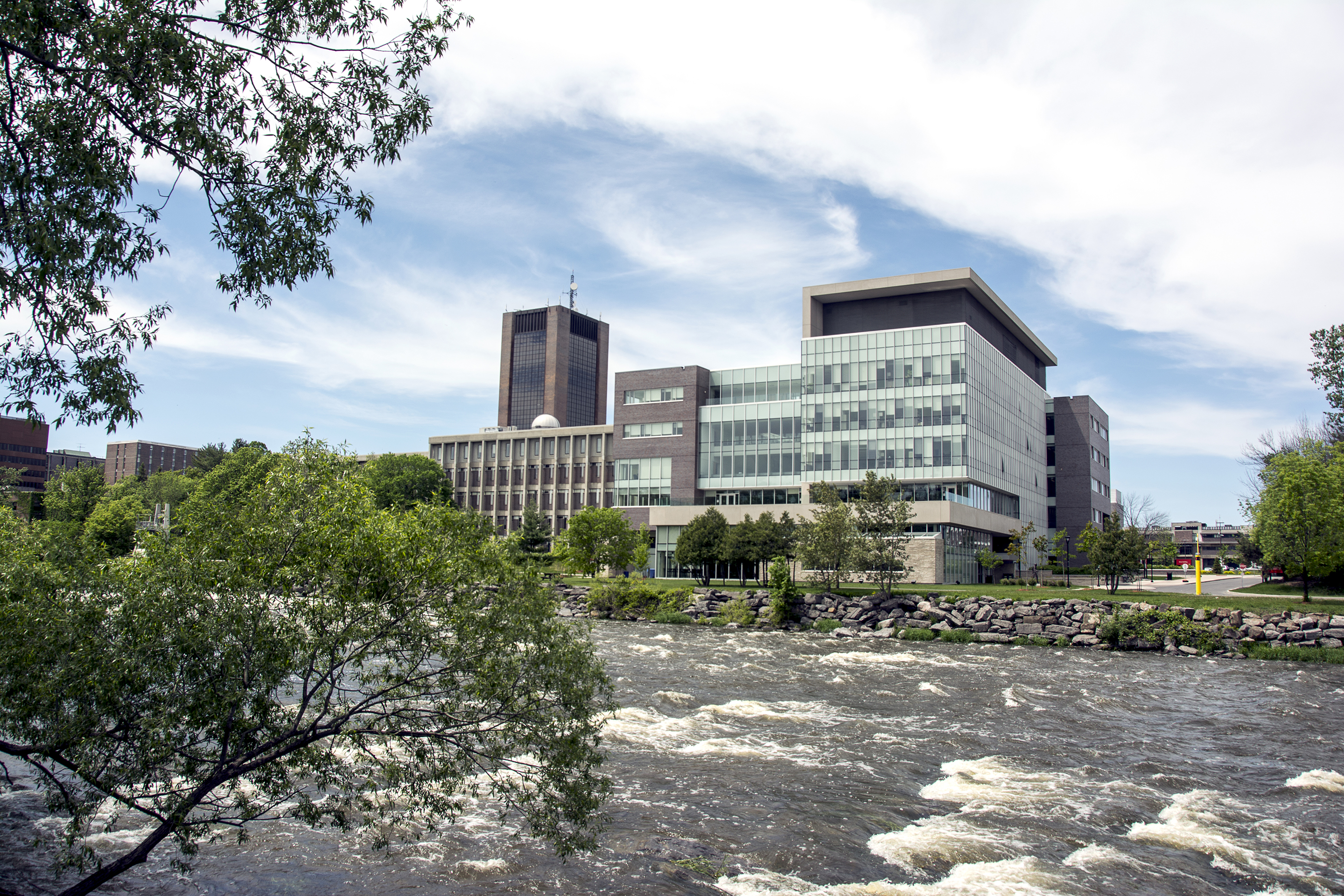
Richcraft Hall, home of the Norman Paterson School of International Affairs

The Norman Paterson School of International Affairs is a professional school of international affairs at Carleton University. Founded in 1965, the school has distinguished itself as Canada's leading school in the field of international affairs, producing graduates that have progressed onward into key leadership positions within the federal government, think tanks, and academia. Established during a 'golden age' of Canadian diplomacy, the school adopts an interdisciplinary approach to the study of global issues, divided into seven clusters organized according to different areas of study under the umbrella of international affairs. NPSIA is the only full Canadian member, as well as a founding member, of the Association of Professional Schools of International Affairs, a group of the world's top schools in international affairs.

==== Science ====
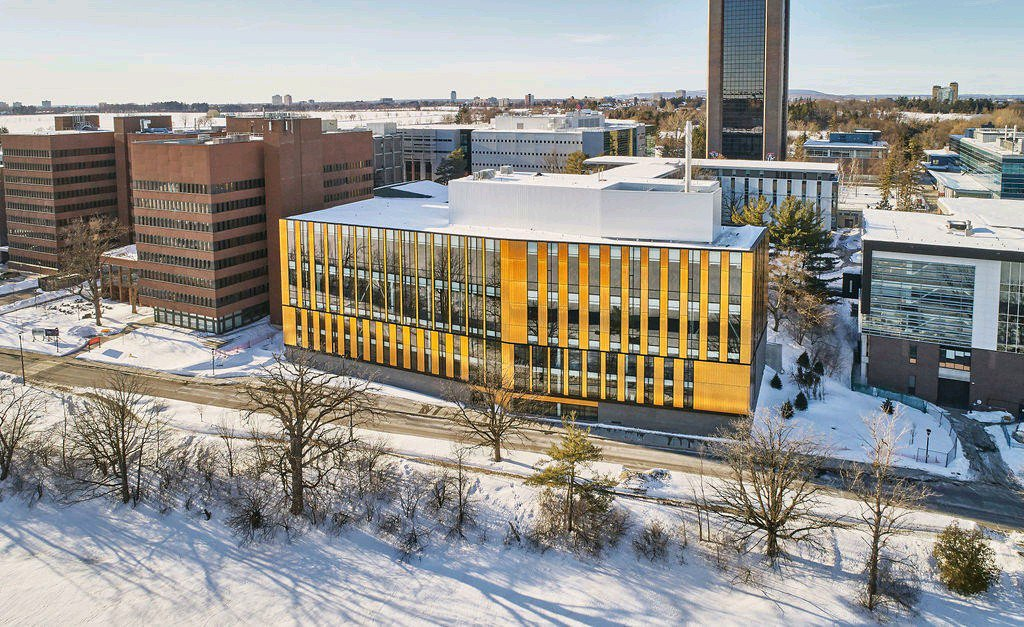
Carleton University's Institute for Advanced Research and Innovation in Smart Environments (ARISE)

The Faculty of Science offers 86 undergraduate and 39 graduate programs across various fields including biology, chemistry, physics, health sciences, nursing, mathematics, computer science, neuroscience, and earth sciences, with over 6,500 students enrolled, served by 177 faculty members. Initial coursework on biology, chemistry, geology, and mathematics was first introduced in 1942 as night classes. In 1947, the school introduced its first undergraduate degrees in science, graduating its first cohort of honours degrees by 1950.

The Faculty of Science is divided into eleven departments, each with distinct teaching and research focuses. Departments are housed in several buildings across campus, including Herzberg Laboratories, Steacie Building, Tory Building, the Nesbitt Biology Building, and the Health Sciences Building. Each of these buildings house laboratories and other facilities for faculty and students alike to conduct research. The Nesbitt Biology Building contains several climate-controlled greenhouses that are host to an annual Butterfly Show in late September to early October, attracting visitors throughout the National Capital Region. The National Wildlife Research Centre, a research facility of Environment and Climate Change Canada is also located on campus, and is home to the National Wildlife Specimen Bank, a repository of over 12,000 specimens of wildlife native to Canada. The centre conducts important research on the effects of toxic substances on wildlife, international migratory bird patterns, and the effects of human activities on wildlife.

==== Sprott School of Business ====
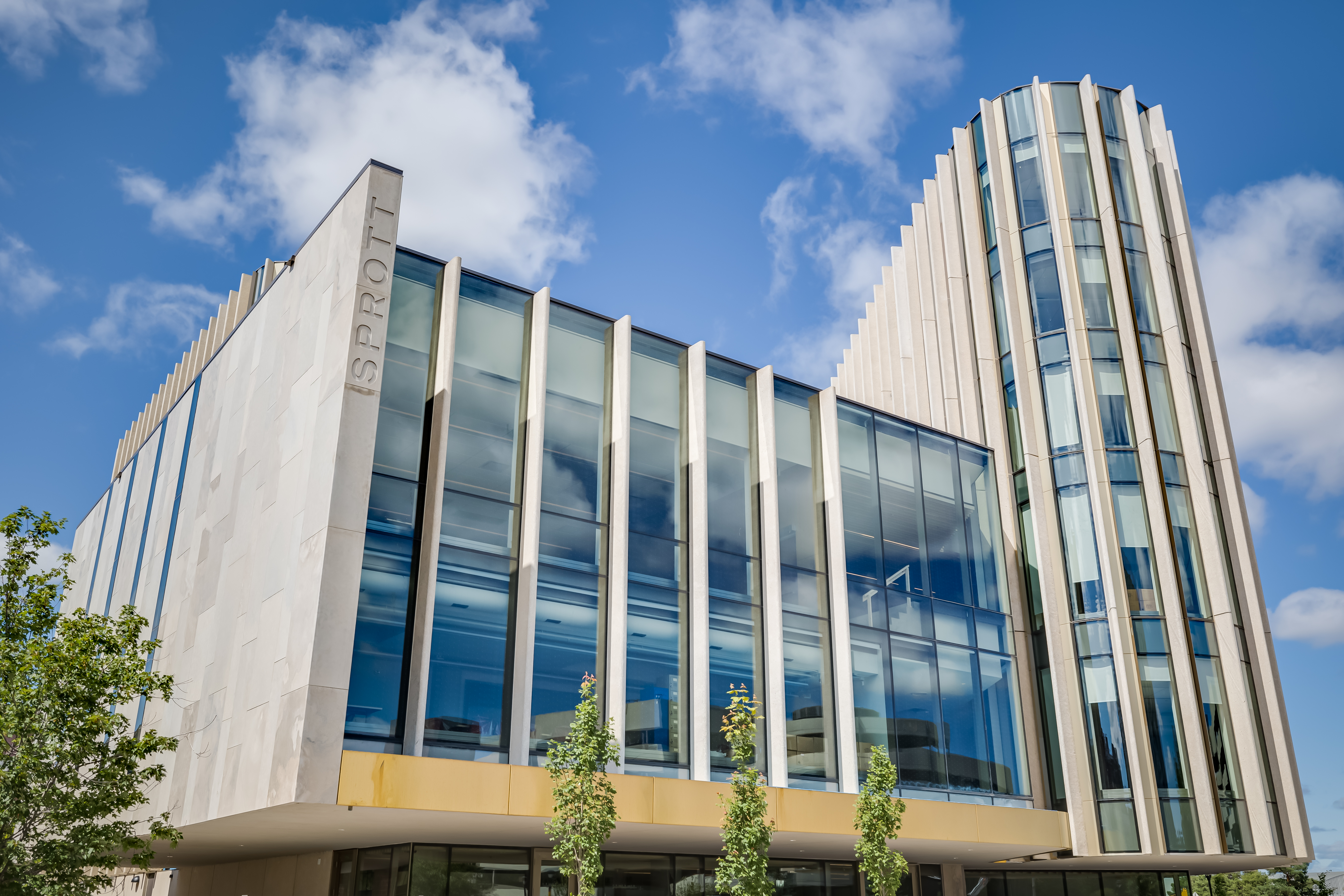
Nicol Building, the home of the Sprott School of Business

Carleton first began offering a Bachelor of Commerce (B.Com.) degree beginning in 1949, and functioned as a department-level academic unit under the Faculty of Arts & Sciences, the Faculty of Social Sciences, and lastly the Faculty of Public Affairs and Management before its establishment as a separate faculty in 2006. The School currently offers two undergraduate programs, the Bachelor of Commerce and Bachelor of International Business with various concentrations like marketing and entrepreneurship, in addition to five graduate-level programs and several certificate programs for professionals. As of the 2023–24 academic year, Sprott programs are attended by 2,043 undergraduate students, served by a full-time faculty of 64.

Sprott is accredited internationally by the Association to Advance Collegiate Schools of Business and by the Network of International Business Schools. The school has been the first in Canada to offer a Bachelor of International Business (BIB). Its principal undergraduate offering, however, is the four-year Bachelor of Commerce (Honours) degree, and at the postgraduate level, MBA and PhD programs are offered. The Sprott School has won the Overall Institution Performance Award, for its research contribution, at the Administrative Sciences Association of Canada (ASAC), in 2004, 2005, 2006, 2007, 2008, 2010, and 2012 among business schools at Canadian comprehensive universities.

=== Admissions ===
For the 2018–19 academic year, Carleton admitted 5,988 first-year undergraduate students. For the 2022–23 academic year, the average undergraduate entrance grade was 87.3%. Undergraduate admission averages and requirements vary by academic program, with some specialized and limited enrolment offerings (e.g., B.Sc., Bachelor of Journalism, B.Hum., B.P.A.P.M. and Aerospace Engineering) requiring admissions averages markedly higher (i.e., in the A/A+ range) compared to their counterparts in other faculties (generally in the B+/A- range).

=== Scholarships and bursaries ===
During the 2022–23 academic year, more than 15,000 scholarships and bursaries totaling over $31.9 million were awarded to undergraduate students.

Students admitted from high school with an academic average above 80% qualify for an entrance scholarship starting at $4,000 over four years, with $1,000 disbursed annually. The amount students receive increases incrementally with their admission average, with students entering with an average above 95% receiving $16,000 over four years. Nevertheless, students must maintain a minimum 10.0 CGPA (A−) year-to-year in order to retain their scholarship

=== Rankings and reputation ===
University rankings

World rankings
- ARWU World: 501–600
- QS World: 781-790
- THE World: 501–600
- USNWR World: 617
- 19–20

Canadian rankings
- QS National: 24
- THE National: 21–24
- USNWR National: 20
- Maclean's Comprehensive: 4
- Maclean's Reputation: 21

Carleton has been included in several Canadian and international college and university rankings. The 2022 international Academic Ranking of World Universities ranked the university in the 501–600 range. In the 2023 international QS World University Rankings, Carleton ranked in the 601–650 range, and 21st in Canada. According to the international 2023 listings for the Times Higher Education World University Rankings, Carleton ranks in the 601–800 range. In the 2022–23 U.S. News & World Report Best Global University Ranking, the university was ranked 526th in the world, and 20th in Canada.

In a 2009 worldwide survey of academics, which sought to determine the best professional Master's programs in International Affairs, Carleton's Norman Paterson School of International Affairs (NPSIA) was the only Canadian school to rank, and ranked 14th in the world. This was followed by a more recent domestic survey of International Relations academics, which, in 2015, recommended Carleton as the best choice for students seeking a career in policy.

Maclean's is a Canadian magazine that publishes an annual ranking of Canadian universities, which is intended to measure a university's overall "undergraduate experience." In its 2025 edition, Carleton ranked fourth in the comprehensive category.

In 2015, Maclean's began publishing program rankings for biology, business, computer science, education, engineering, mathematics, medicine, nursing, and psychology. As of 2019, Carleton is ranked 7th in Canada for engineering, 10th in computer science, 10th in mathematics and 14th in psychology. Carleton does not offer nursing, medicine, or education programs, specifically; however, it does have a Health Sciences faculty, which includes a biomedicine program and a disability and chronic illness program, and does have, in its Arts faculty, a Childhood and Youth Studies program originally rooted in Early Childhood Education (ECE).

85 Carleton researchers, past and present, were included on the 2024 Stanford-Elsevier list of the world's most-cited scholars. This places these researchers in the world's top 2% most-cited scholars.

In 2024, Carleton was recognized as one of Canada's Top 100 Employers for the third consecutive year. In 2025, it was recognized as a Top Employer for Canadians over 40 and one of Canada's Top Family-Friendly Employers, both for the third consecutive year. It was also named one of the National Capital Region's Top Employers for the 11th consecutive year.

=== Previously Affiliated institutions ===
- Dominican University College: Formerly an independent, bilingual Roman Catholic institution issuing undergraduate and graduate degrees in philosophy and theology located in the Centretown West neighbourhood of Ottawa. The school was affiliated with Carleton from 2012 to 2024.

== Campus ==
Carleton University campus
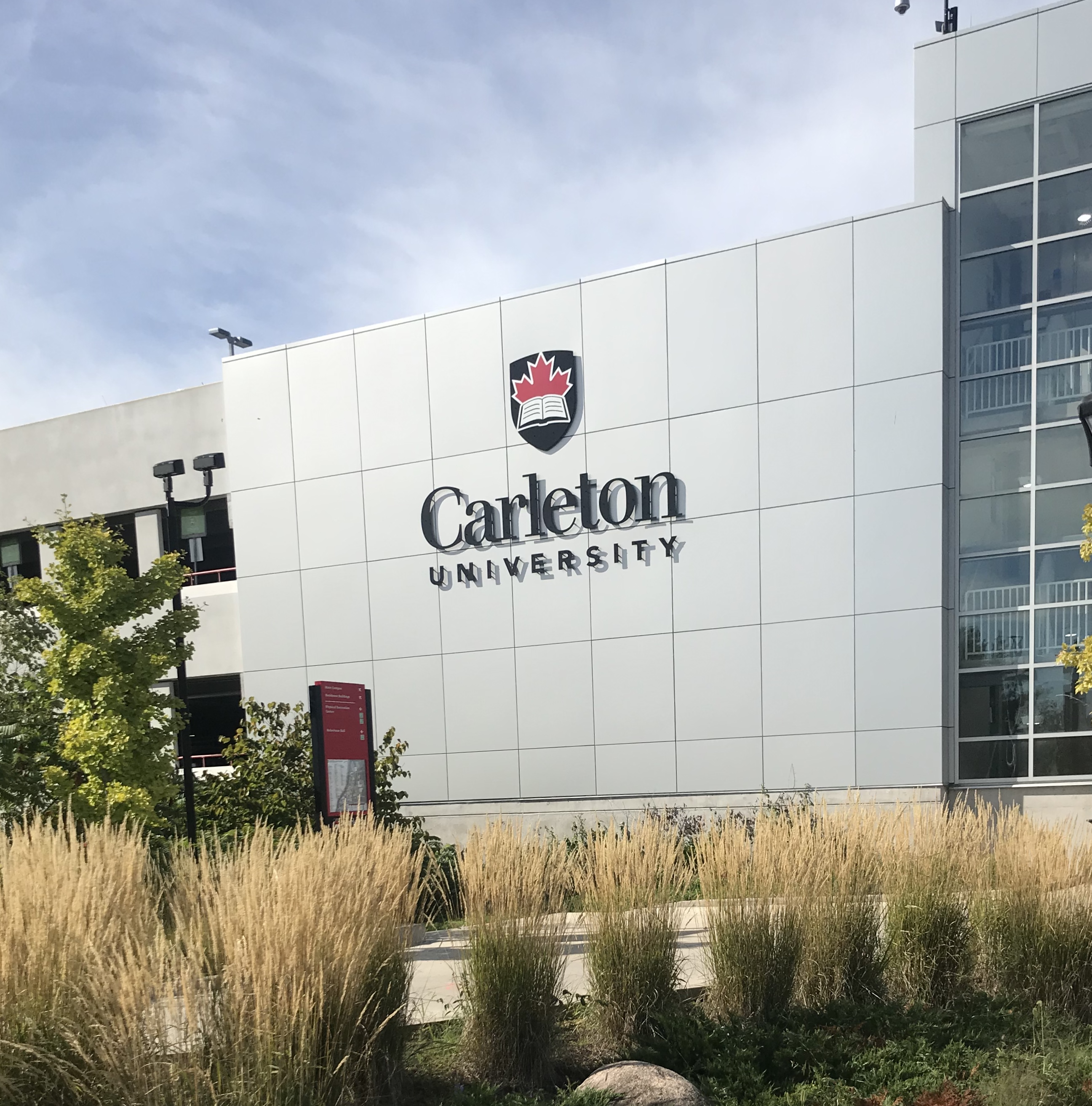
Parking garage near Bronson Avenue entrance

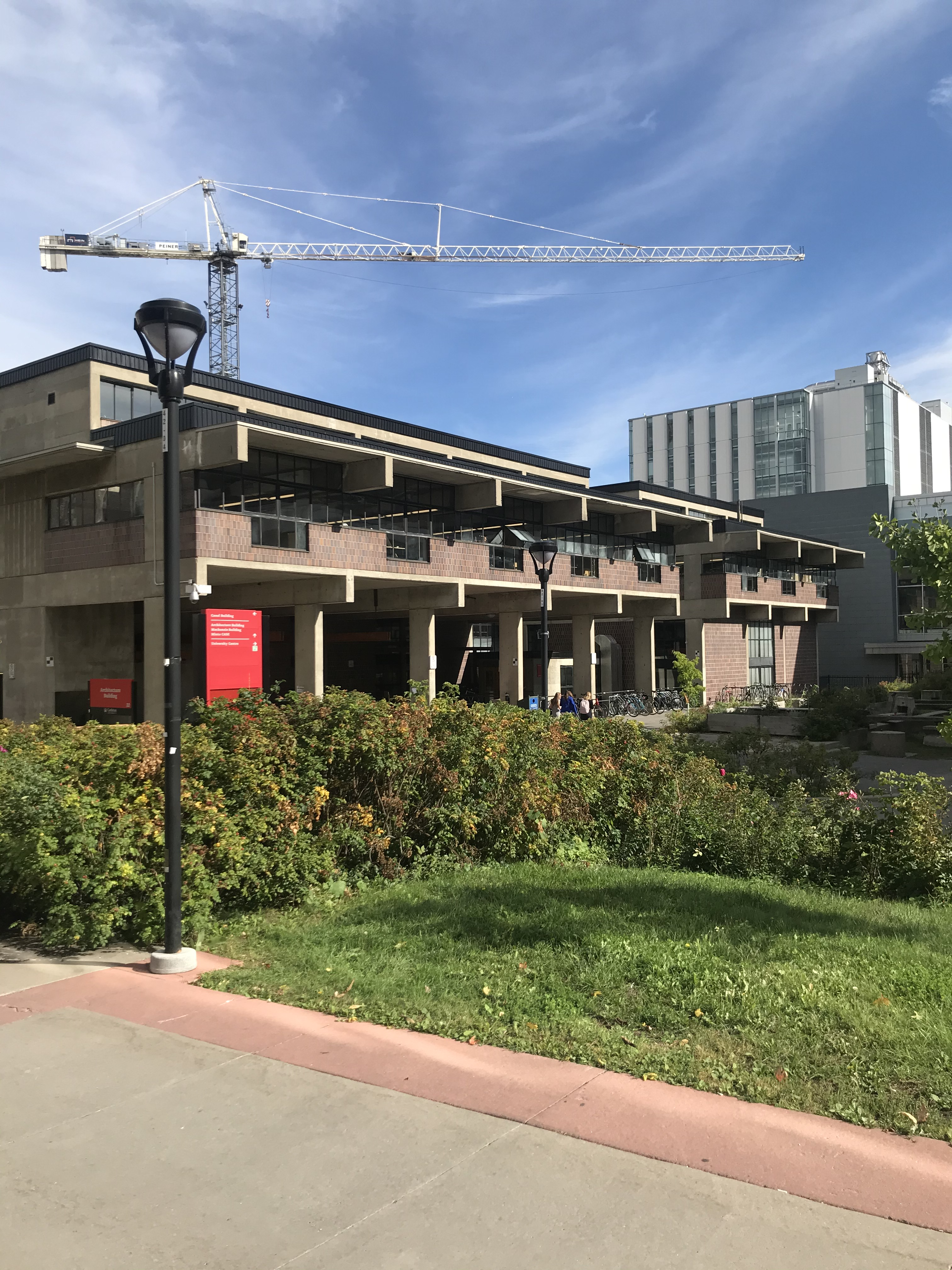
Architecture Building, housing the Azrieli School of Architecture and Urban Design

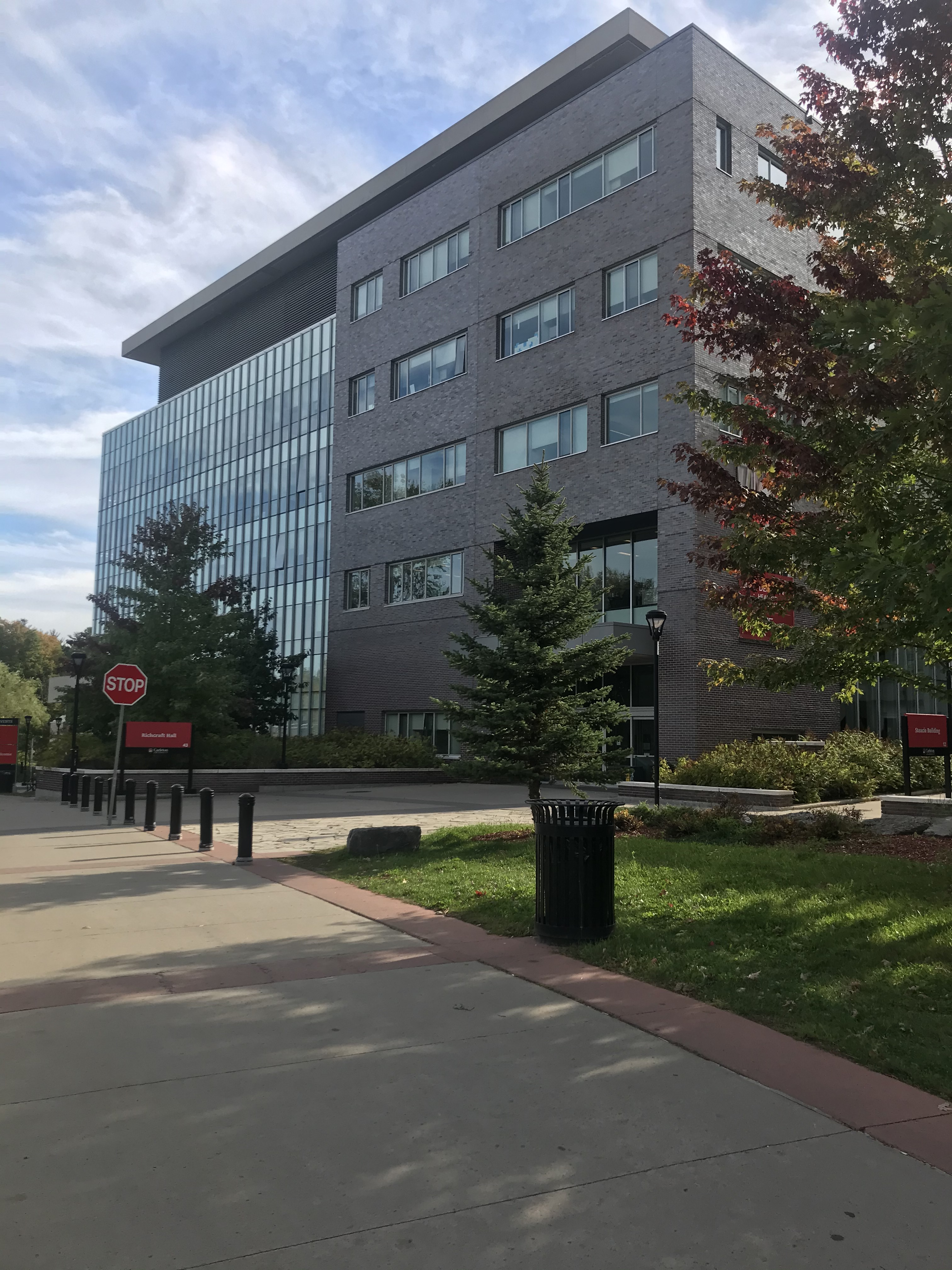
Richcraft Hall, formerly known as River Building, home of Carleton's journalism, public policy, and international affairs programs

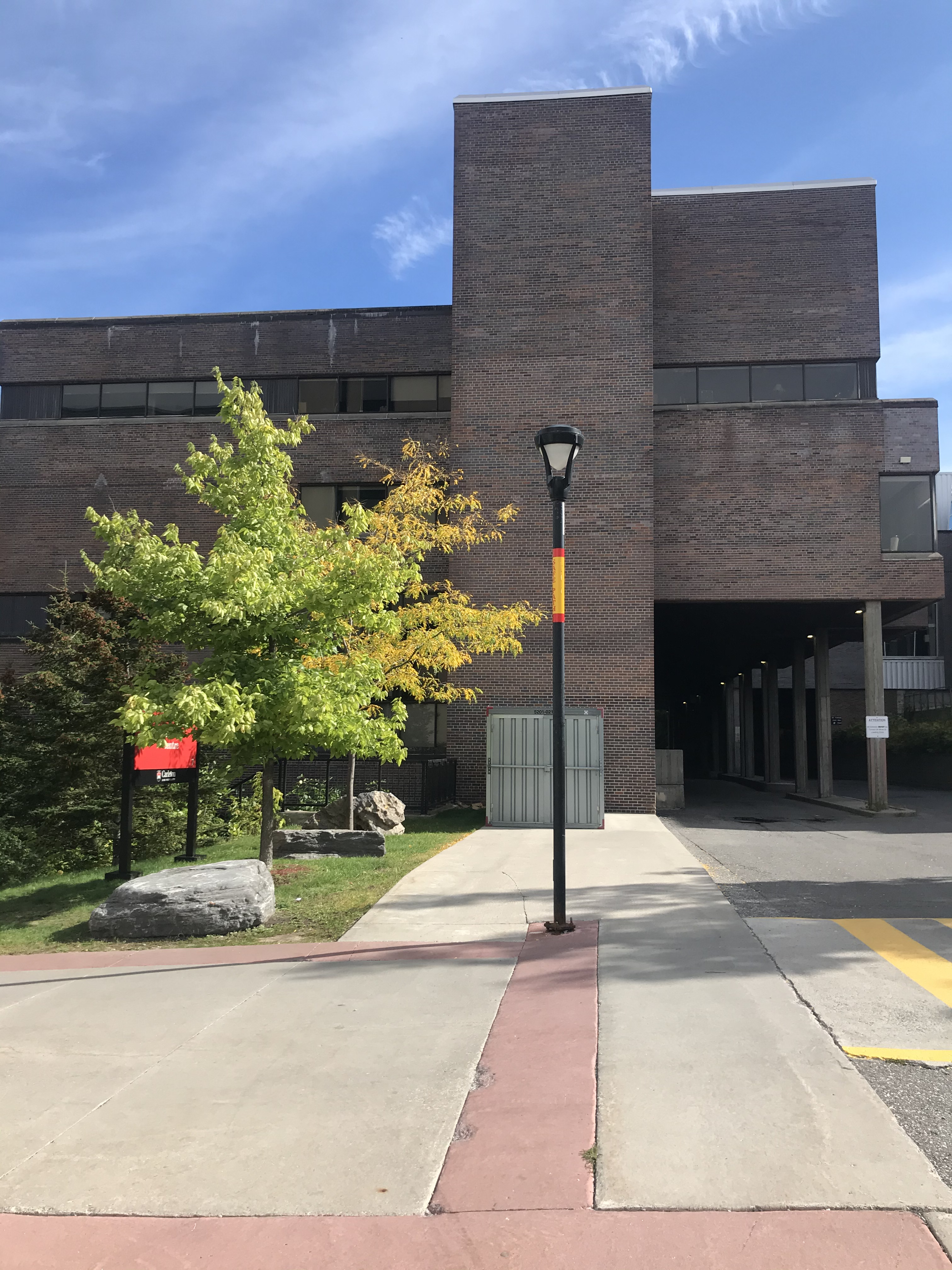
Nideyinàn, formerly University Centre, containing various student service centres and classrooms

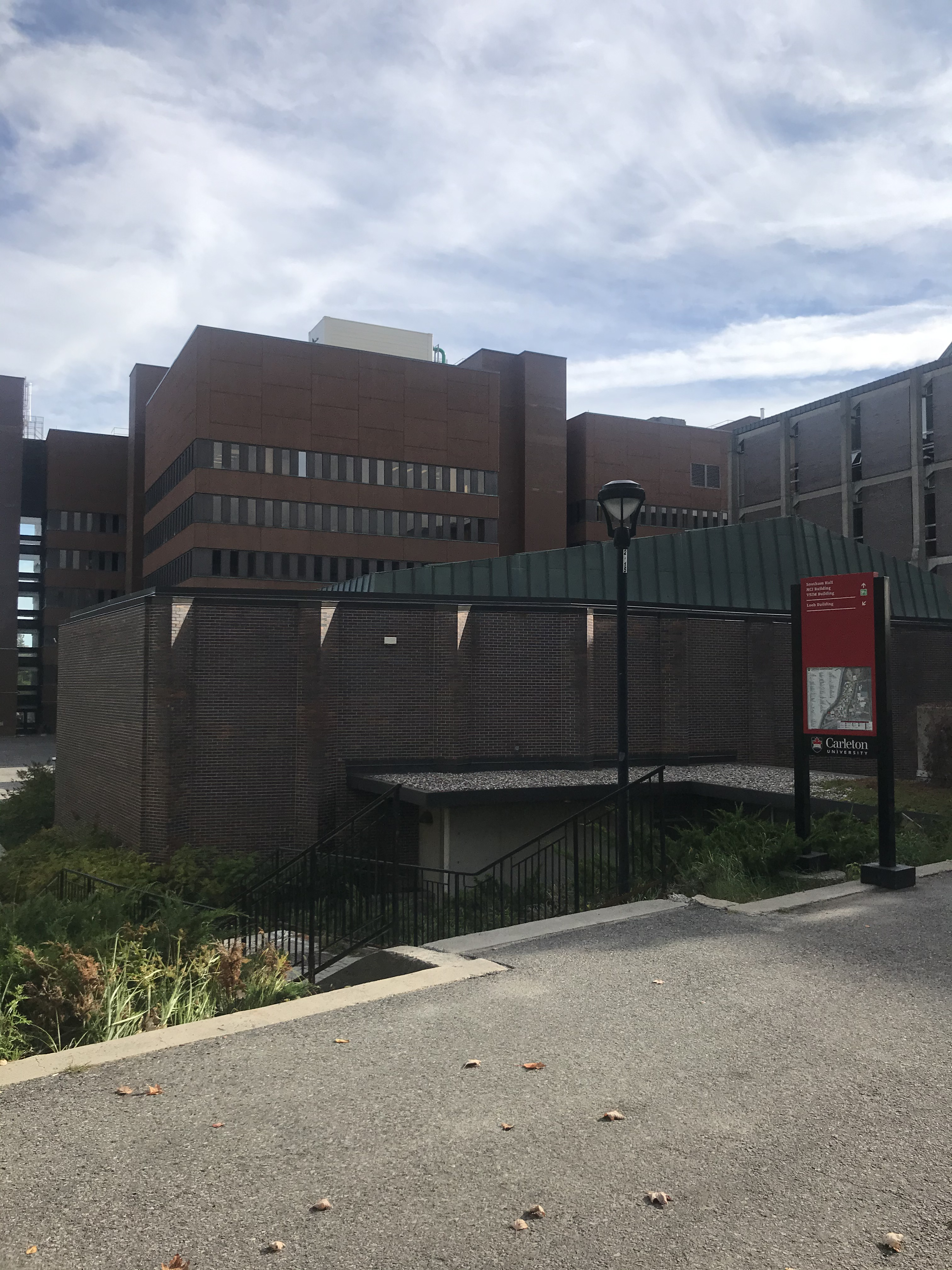
Southam Hall and Loeb Building

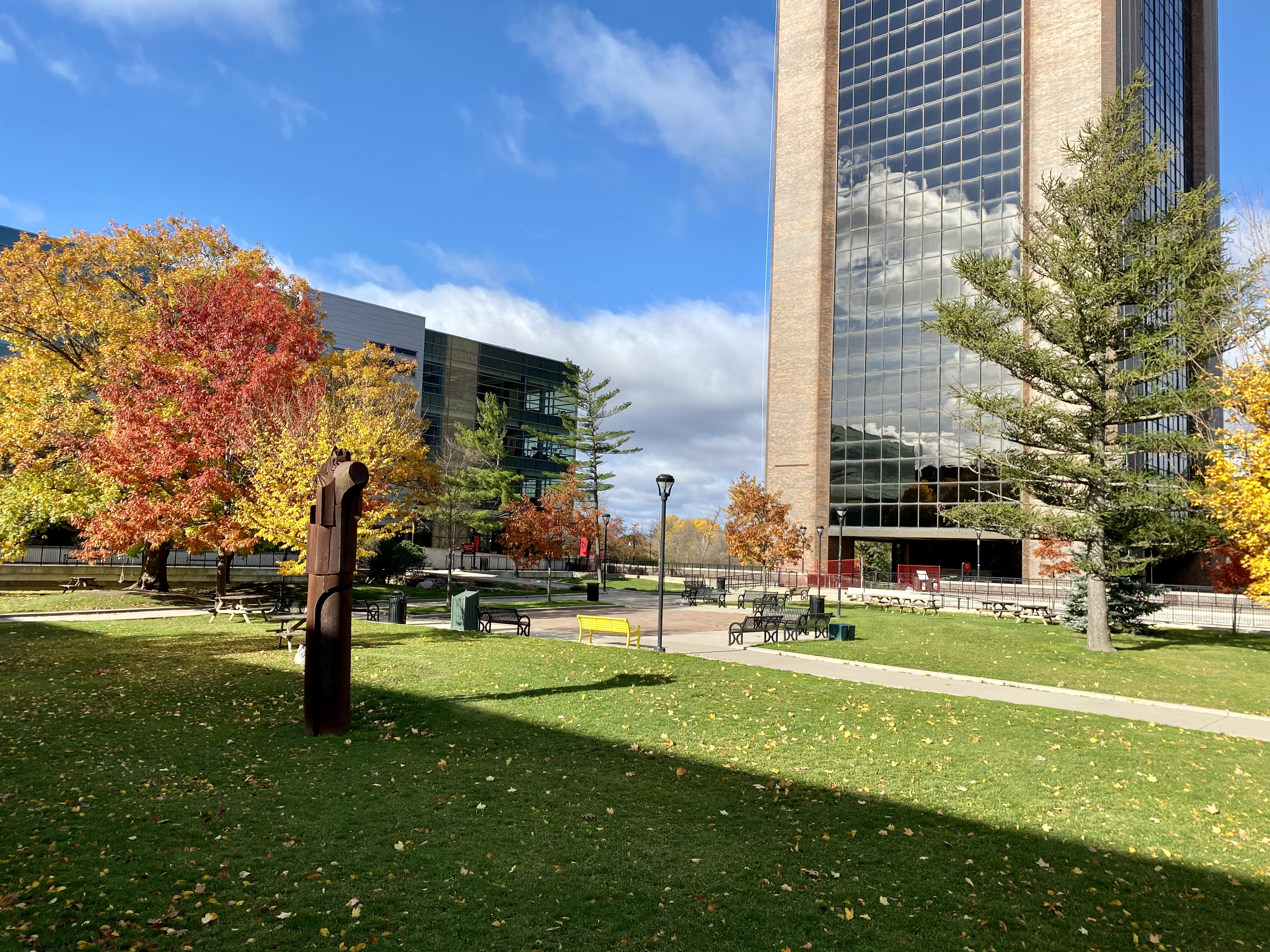
View of the main academic quadrangle, facing MacOdrum Library

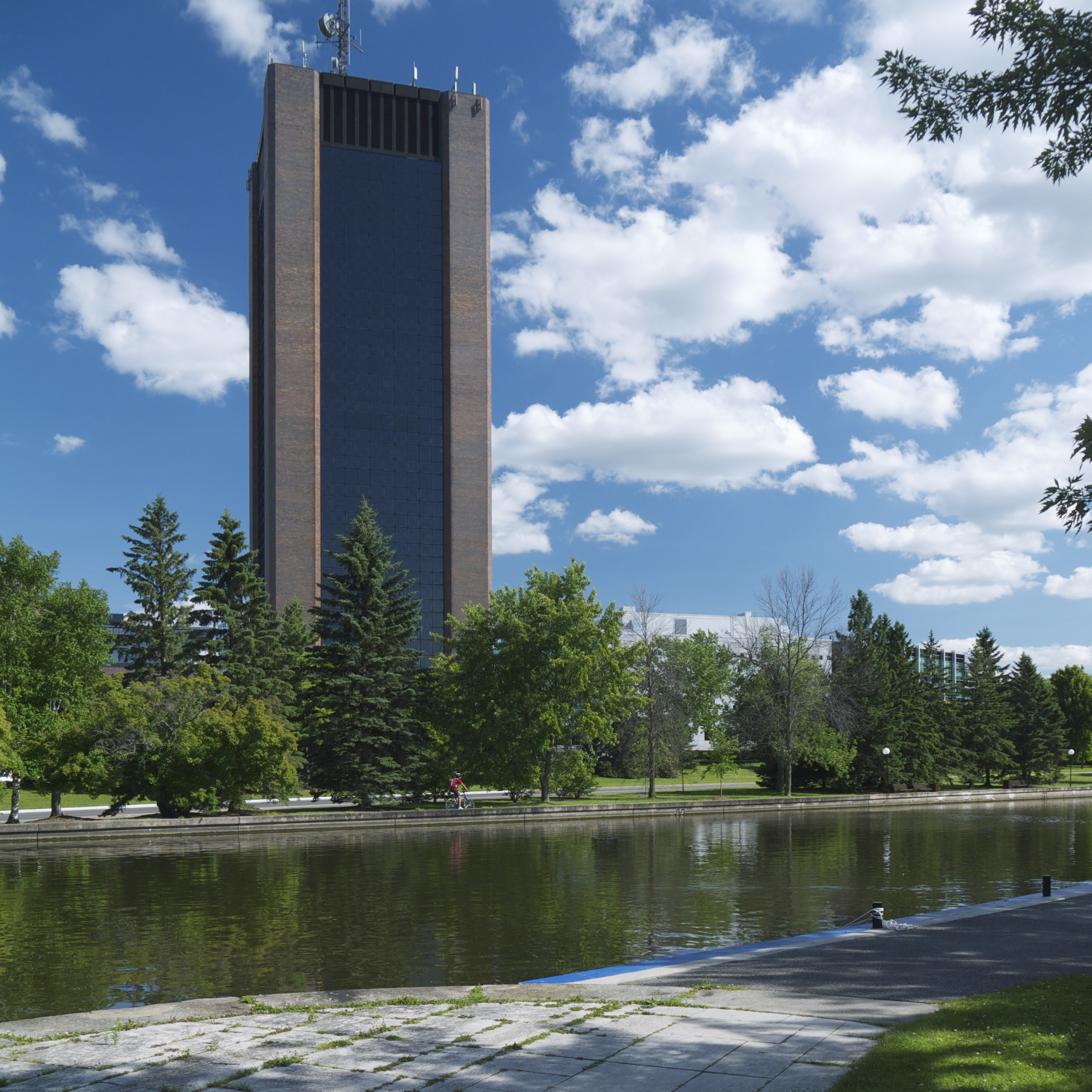
Dunton Tower viewed from Hartwells Locks

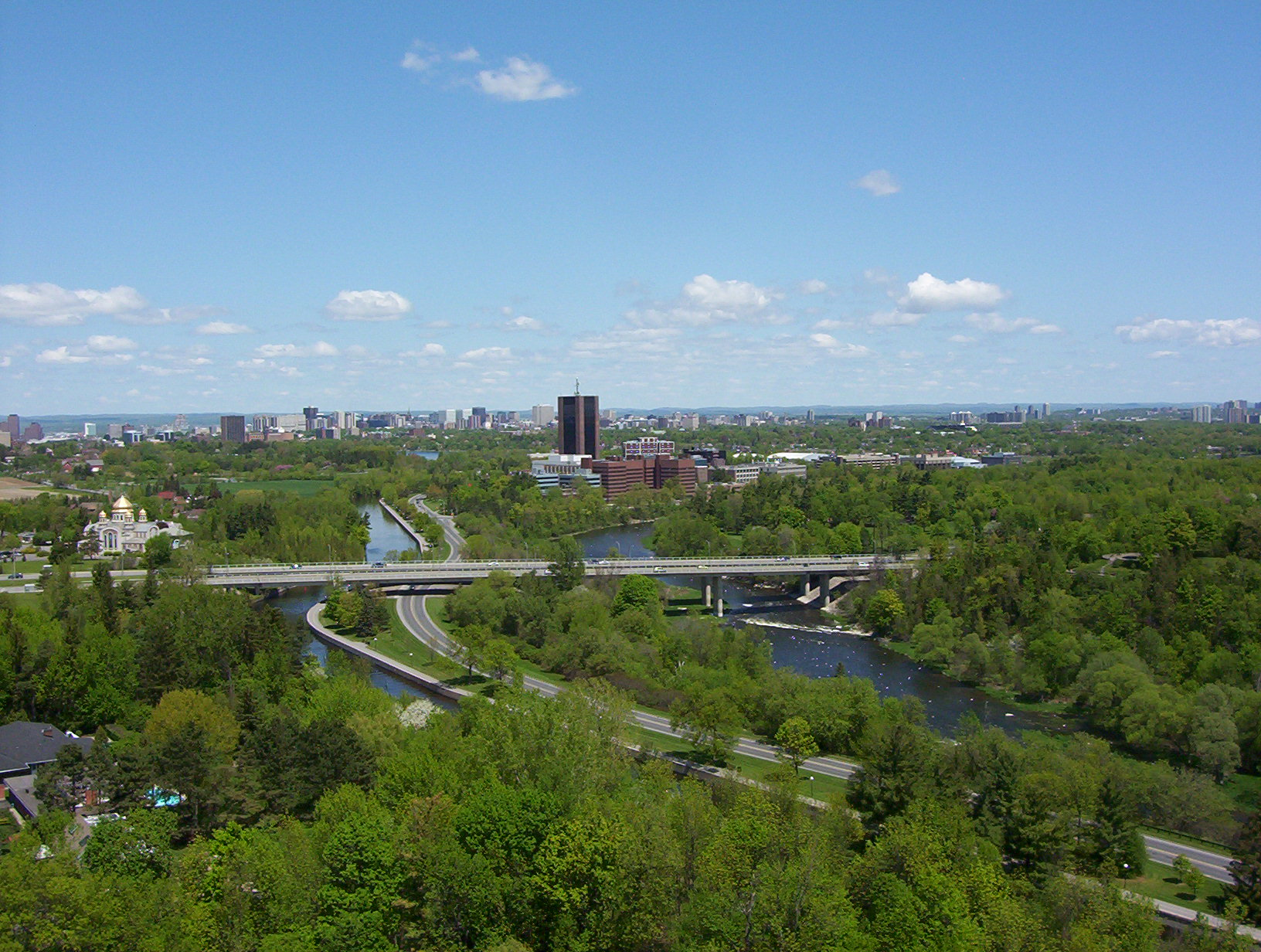
Carleton University campus as seen from the south

Carleton's campus is situated on 153 acres (62 ha) bounded to the west by Colonel By Drive and the Rideau Canal, to the east by Bronson Avenue, and the south by the Rideau River. The campus is situated adjacent to the Dominion Arboretum and the Central Experimental Farm.

During its initial construction in 1959, the campus consisted of three buildings, the MacOdrum Library, the Tory Building, and Paterson Hall, forming a quadrangle situated at the heart of the university's academic buildings. Since then, the university has expanded to forty-nine buildings, the newest addition being Rideau House, which was inaugurated in 2025.

The campus is accessible to road traffic through two entrances respectively located at Bronson Avenue and Colonel By Drive. Carleton's campus contains a series of surface roads to facilitate traffic in and out of the university, the most heavily used of them being Campus Avenue, which was converted to a single-direction road in 2019 to ease congestion.

Several OC Transpo bus routes, including the 7, 10, 48, and 111, serve the campus directly, in addition to the O-Train's Carleton station, located at the centre of campus.

The campus is bisected by O-Train Line 2, with several pedestrian and vehicular bridges and tunnels facilitating access between either side. The majority of the university's academic and residential buildings are situated on the western side of campus, while the eastern side contains the university's athletics facilities and administrative offices.

=== Architecture ===
The prevalence of modernist and brutalist architecture in the design of the earliest academic buildings on the Carleton campus represented a stylistic departure from traditional collegiate architecture in North America, which historically emulated the Gothic style dominant in many European universities. The decision to incorporate modernism into the campus' design was intentional, presenting Carleton as an egalitarian, progressive, and forward-thinking institution.

Architectural critics have looked to Carleton as a leading example of modernist collegiate architecture in Canada. The campus became the subject of Modern U, an exhibition by local artist Adrian Gröllner that sought to highlight the late modernist architecture embodied by many of Carleton's early buildings.

=== Tunnel system ===
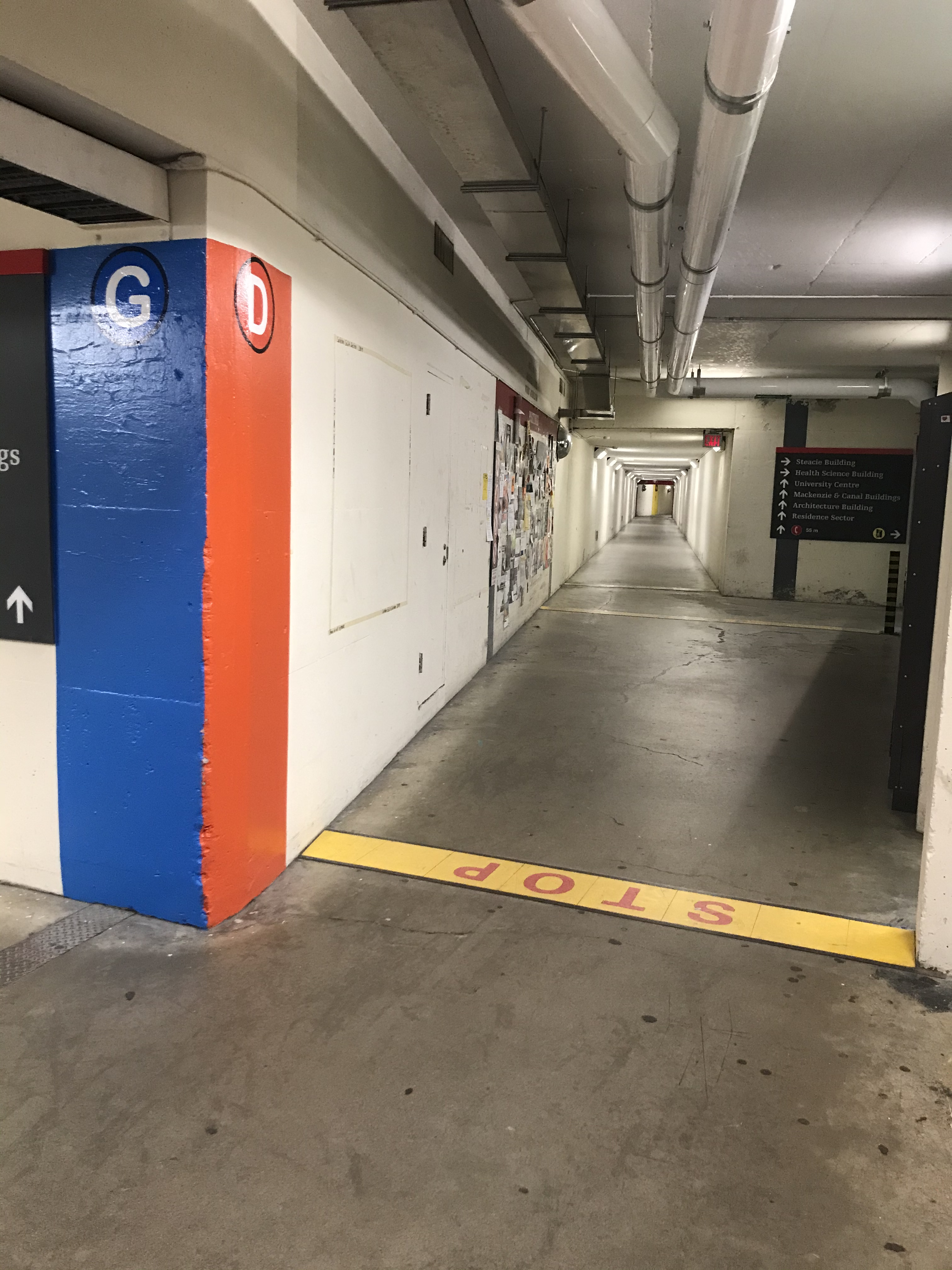
Junction between tunnels near the Health Sciences Building. Note the alphabetic wayfinding signage distinguishing tunnel routes.

Buildings on campus, with a few exceptions, are connected by a five kilometre-long system of underground pedestrian tunnels. The Carleton University tunnel system is the most extensive network of tunnels at a Canadian university or college campus. The tunnels were initially built as part of the second phase of initial construction on campus in the 1960s. Originally conceived as a maintenance crawl space connecting heating and ventilation between campus buildings, a suggestion by a staff member transformed them into accessible pedestrian tunnels for students and faculty to use when travelling between different buildings on campus. The tunnels receive heightened usage during the winter months due to the severity of winters in Ottawa. Maintenance staff use modified golf carts in the tunnels to transport personnel, supplies, and mail to different locations on campus.

In 2019, Carleton introduced a new wayfinding system to assist students, faculty, and visitors in navigating the tunnel networking, using a metro-style map to display the network.

=== Student housing ===
In 1969, the university introduced the first co-educational dormitories in North America. Since then, the university has gradually expanded the number of dormitories as enrolment has risen. On-campus housing at Carleton is configured in traditional and suite-style residences, with the latter offering students a kitchenette shared between four students. Unlike most collegiate dormitories, bathroom facilities are usually shared between two rooms, in contrast to the typical communal bathrooms. Residence floors are staffed by dedicated Residence Fellows, upper-year students hired by the university's Department of Housing and Residence Life Services to provide personal and academic support to students.

== Library and collections ==
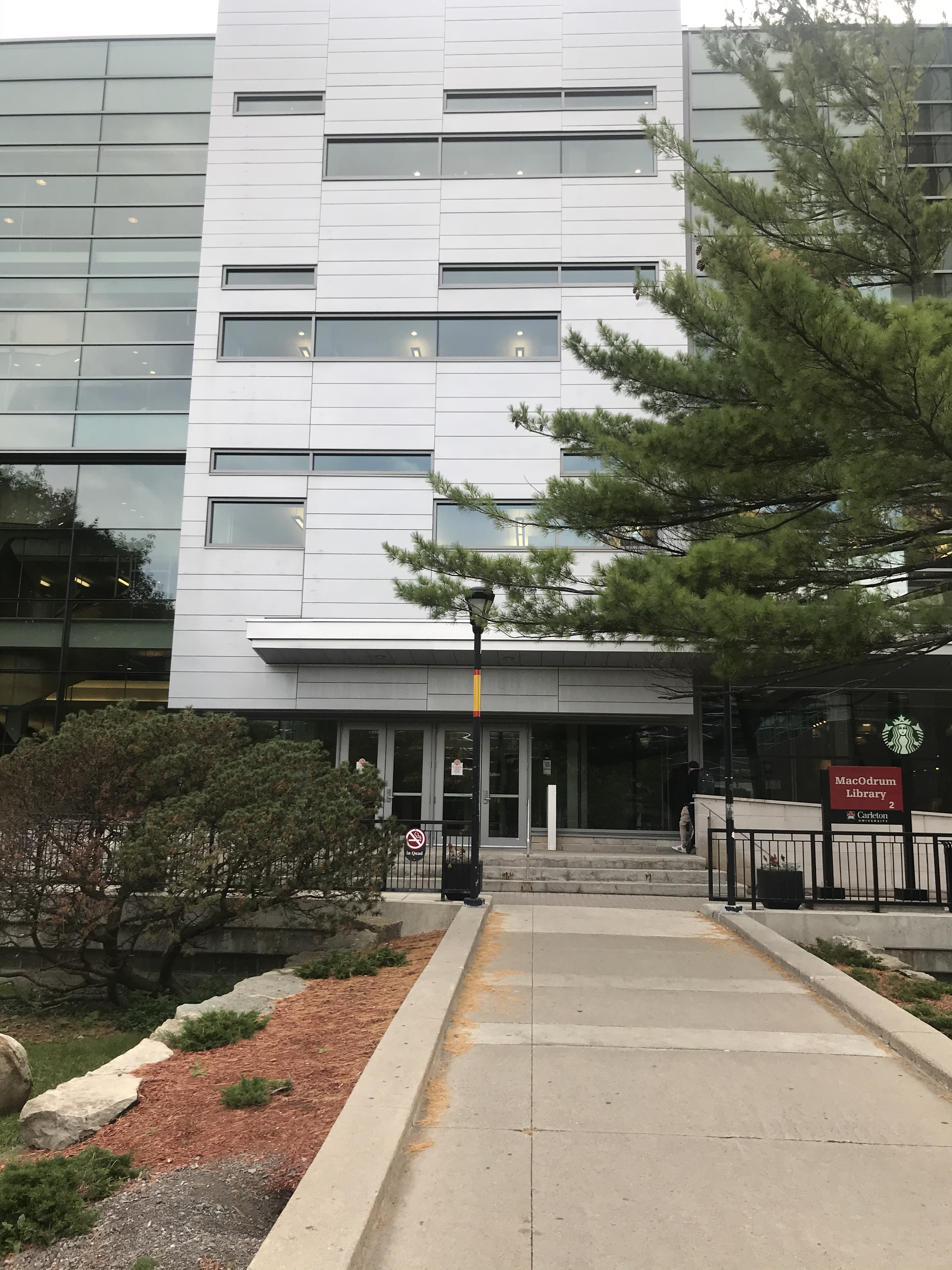
Main facade of MacOdrum Library, renovated in 2013

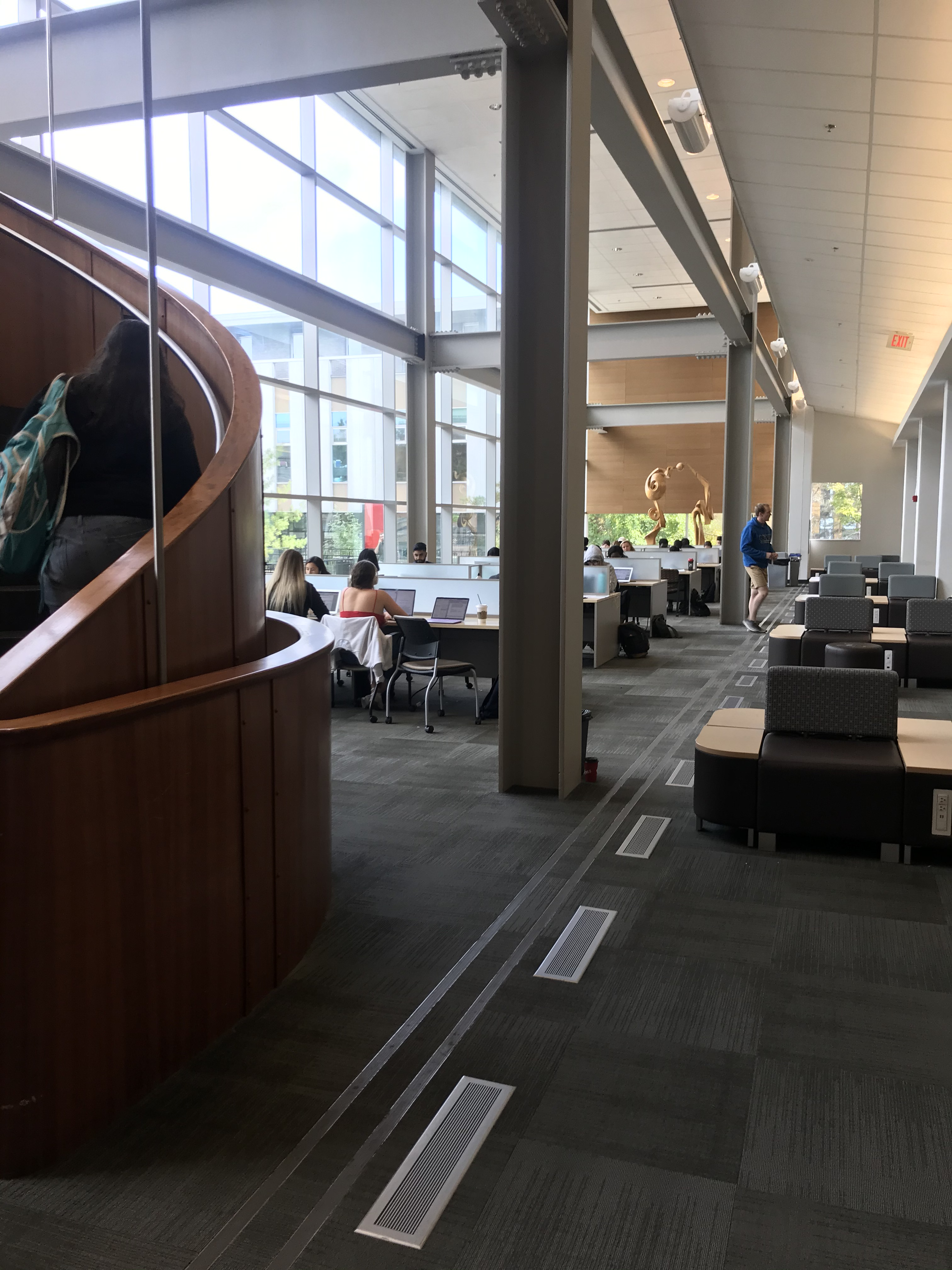
View of study carrels on the second floor of MacOdrum Library

=== MacOdrum Library ===
One of the three original buildings on the Carleton campus, the MacOdrum Library serves as Carleton's central library and archives. The library is named for former Carleton President and Vice-Chancellor Murdoch Maxwell MacOdrum. As of 2022, the Library maintains a collection of approximately 1.2 million print monographs, 2.7 million e-books, and over 260,000 e-journals. During final exam periods, the library extends its operating hours to twenty-four hours to accommodate students preparing for their examinations or completing assignments. On an annual basis, the library receives upwards of 1.6 million visits from students, faculty, and researchers.

In 2013, the library inaugurated the Discovery Centre for Undergraduate Research, a multi-purpose space containing meeting tables, multimedia collaborative spaces, video game laboratories, as well as 3D printers. In 2023, the fourth floor of the MacOdrum Library, including the Discovery Centre, was transformed into a newly designed space called the Future Learning Lab, which includes spaces for studying, events and workshops, along with an XR (mixed-reality) equipped space.

The library regularly hosts exhibitions on the second floor, covering a broad spectrum of topics and academic disciplines. The second floor is also home to the Book Arts Lab, an experiential and multidisciplinary learning space dedicated to hands-on learning about typesetting, letterpress printing, bookbinding, decorative paper techniques and illustrations, such as wood cuts.

==== Archives and Special Collections ====
The MacOdrum Library maintains extensive archives and research collections of documents, artifacts, and other materials related to specific academic disciplines, as well as the personal effects of various persons of historical significance. Notable collections include the W. McAllister Johnson Collection, containing artwork and other documents pertaining to French art history in the 17th and 18th centuries, The Uganda Collection, which houses newspaper clippings, documents, and artifacts related to the expulsion of Uganda's South Asian minority under the rule of Idi Amin, as well as Carleton University heritage material, including yearbooks, student newspapers, photographs, and ephemera significant to the history of the university itself.

=== Carleton University Art Gallery ===
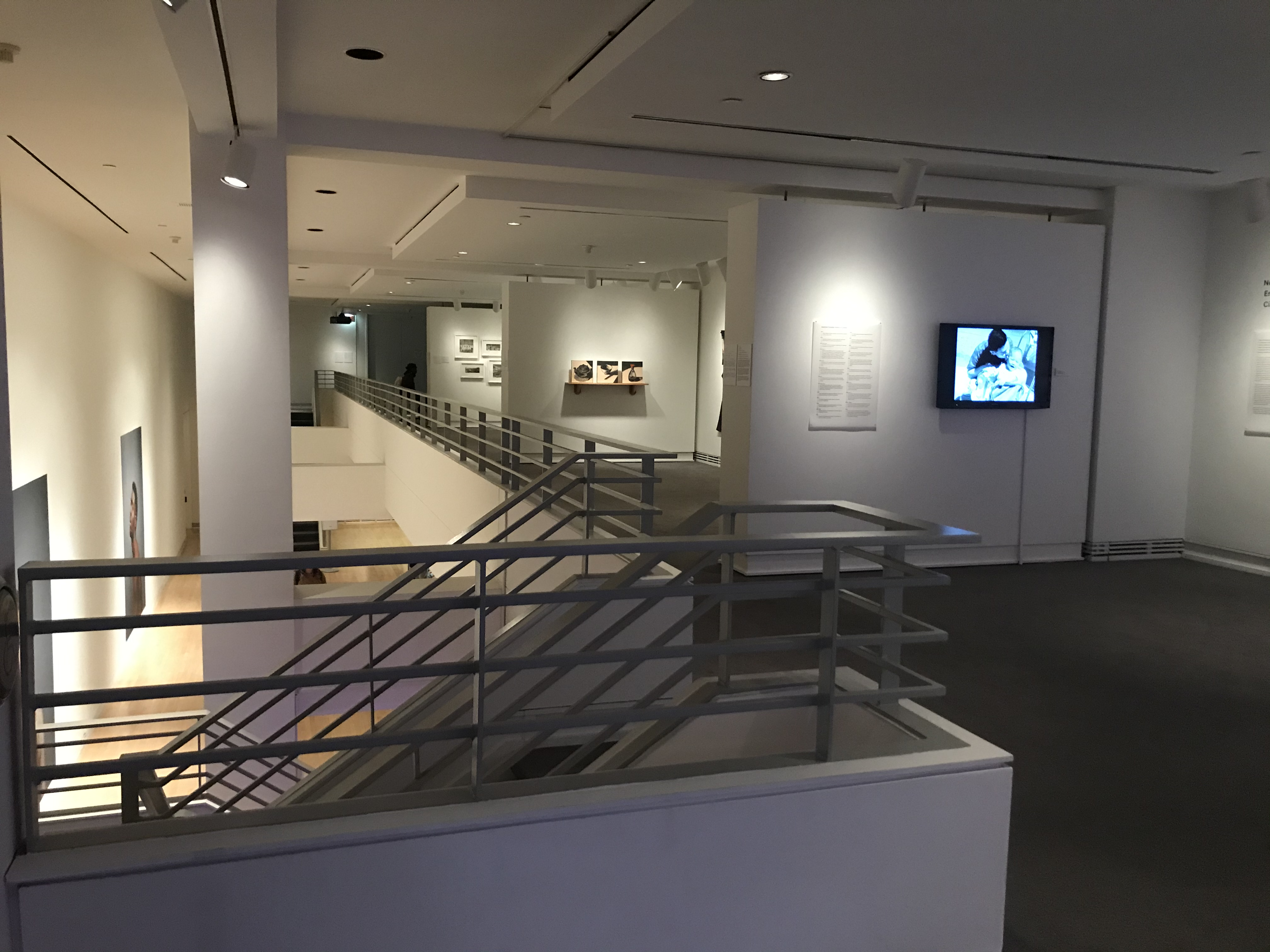
Carleton University Art Gallery, second floor exhibitions

Since 1992, the Carleton University Art Gallery (CUAG), located in a 9,255 sq ft (859.8 m^{2}) facility in the St. Patrick's Building at the north end of campus, has served as a community hub for the visual arts at Carleton. CUAG contains three distinctive galleries on two floors, offices, collection storage vaults, and exhibition preparation room.

Admission to the gallery is free, and is open from Tuesday to Sunday weekly, with the exception of statutory holidays. In addition to its main exhibitions, the CUAG has a Curatorial Laboratory dedicated to installations curated by members of the Carleton community.

Past notable exhibitions include The Other NFB, which featured photography taken by the now-defunct Still Photography Division of the National Film Board of Canada during World War II and through the post-war years, Here Be Dragons, which sought to display new experimental forms of protest art, and Dorset Seen, showcasing Inuit printmaking and its relation to the Inuit experience with the Canadian identity.

CUAG also oversees the university's art collection, which focuses on twentieth-century Canadian art after 1950, European prints and drawings from the 16th to 19th centuries, as well as Inuit and First Nations art.

=== Carleton Dominion-Chalmers Centre ===
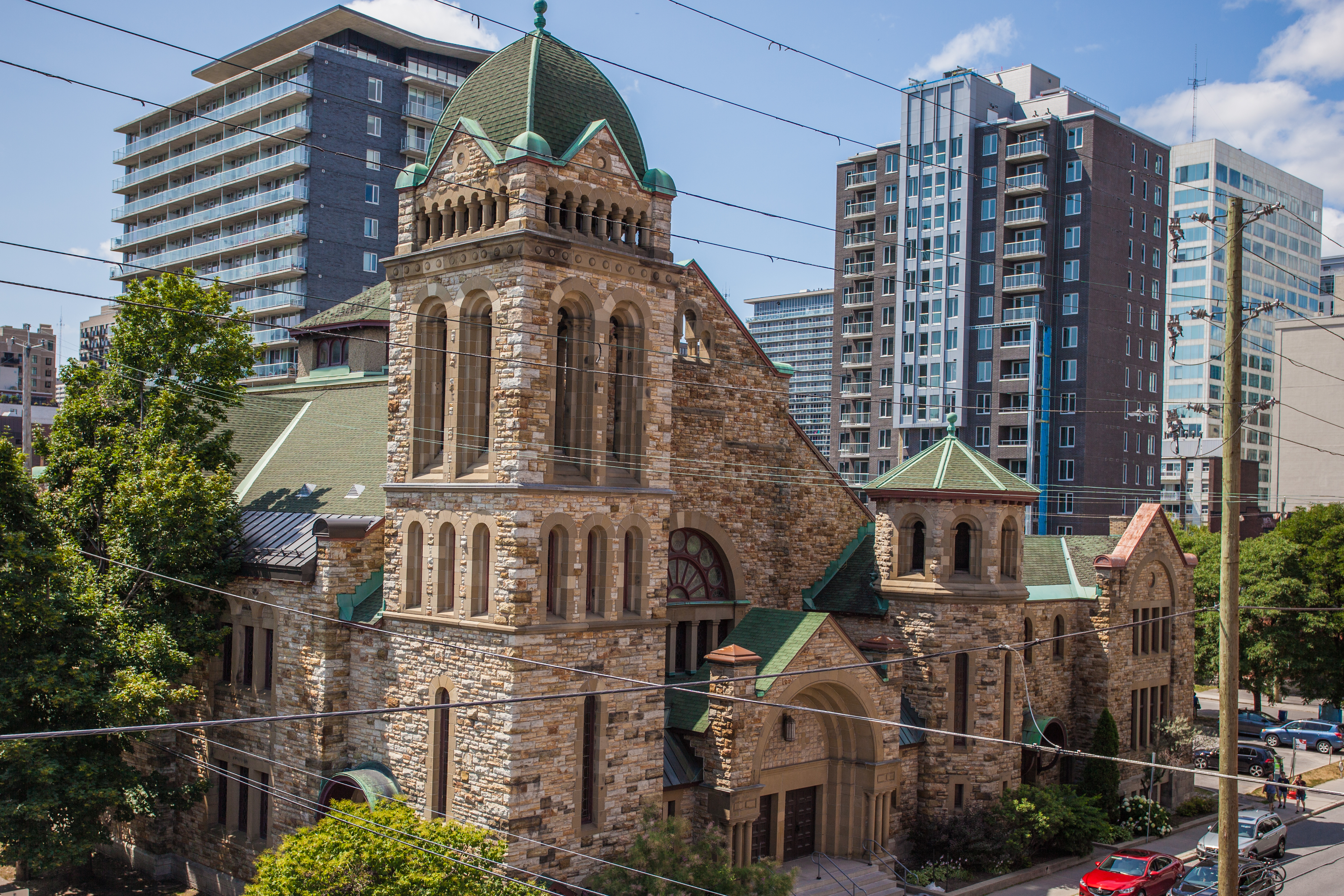
Carleton Dominion-Chalmers Centre

In 2018, Carleton purchased Dominion-Chalmers United Church, securing a future rehearsal and performance space for its Faculty of Arts and Social Sciences. Renamed, the Carleton Dominion-Chalmers Centre (CDCC), it is now Carleton's arts, performance and learning centre. The CDCC is the Carleton's first downtown Ottawa building and is managed by the Faculty of Arts and Social Sciences. The centre is about 37,000 square feet with a seating capacity of approximately 1,000. It continues to host religious services for the church's congregation as well as serve a variety of user groups from the community at large in addition to providing programing and experiential learning opportunities in arts and performance.

== Student life ==
Demographics of student body (2015–16)
	Undergraduate	Graduate
Male	52.7%	51.5%
Female	47.3%	48.5%
Canadian student	88.6%	78.8%
International student	11.4%	21.2%

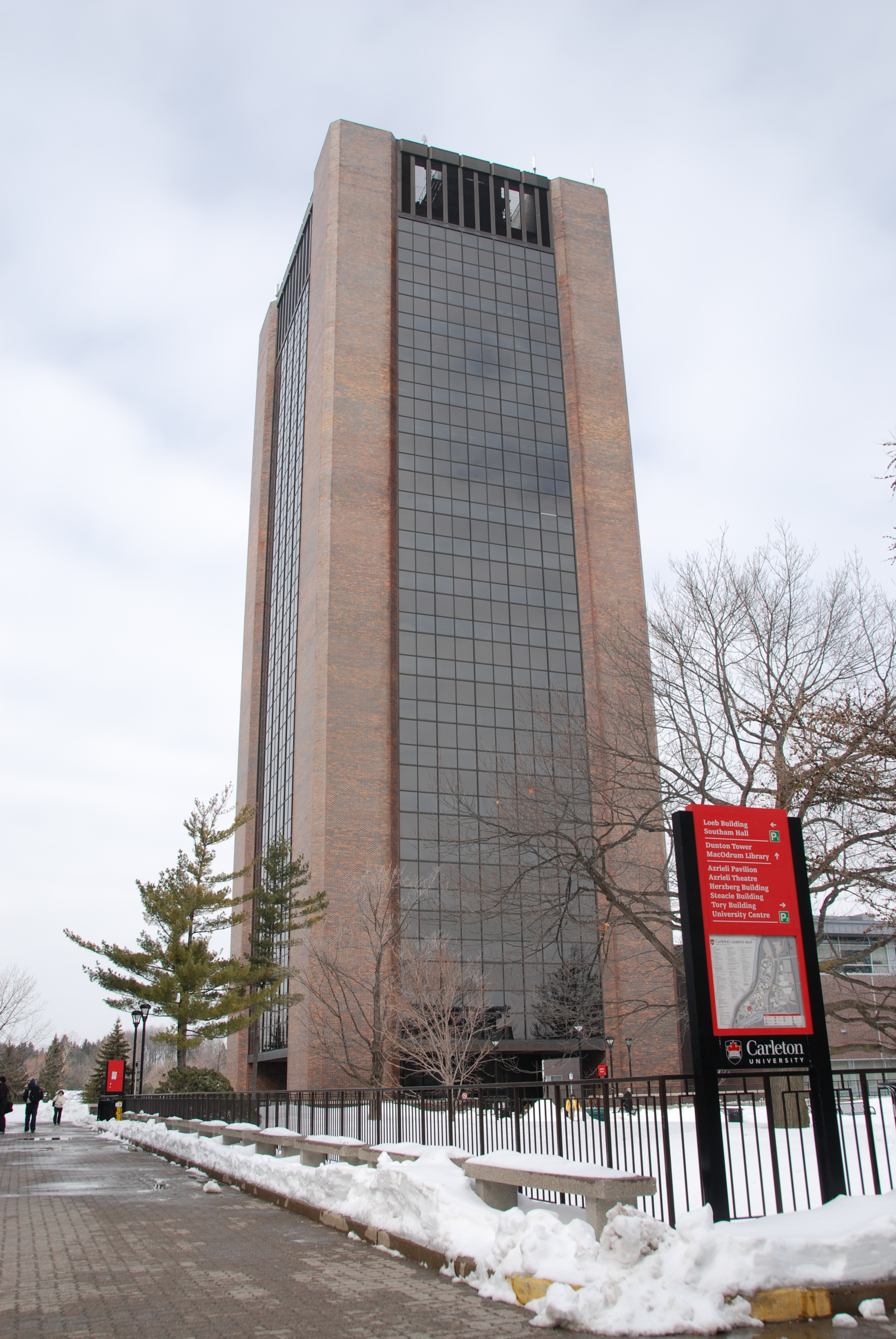
Dunton Tower, the tallest building on campus, measuring 22 floors

=== Student union and services ===
==== Carleton University Students' Association ====
All undergraduate students are members of the Carleton University Students' Association (CUSA), Canadian Federation of Students Local 1. The organization was established in 1942 and has a long history of being a nucleus of political activity on campus. The organization advocates for the interests of undergraduate students to the university's administration, organizes and delivers the annual Orientation Week in conjunction with the university, certifies and financially supports student-run clubs and societies and provides a variety of services to students.

CUSA is led by a six-member executive body comprising the President and Vice Presidents of Finance, Internal, Student Issues, Student Services, and Student Life, who are elected annually by the undergraduate student body. Undergraduate students also elect twenty-eight Councillors allocated proportionately to each faculty, with 2 seats to Business, 4 to Engineering & Design, 4 to Arts and Social Sciences, 8 to Public Affairs, and 3 to Science, in addition to ex-officio representatives from RRRA and the GSA.

The organization administers a number of student centres designed to cater to the safety and well-being of various members of the student body; these are the Mawandoseg Centre, the Carleton Disability Awareness Centre, Food Centre, Foot Patrol, Gender and Sexuality Resource Centre, the Racialized and International Student Experience Centre and the Women's Learning, Advocacy, and Support Centre. CUSA also runs a number of businesses: Oliver's Pub and Patio, an undergraduate student pub located on the first floor of Nideyinàn which in addition to serving traditional pub fare, hosts a range of student events throughout the year; Rooster's Coffeehouse, a café located in Nideyinàn that primarily serves coffee, baked goods, and light meals; Haven Books, a discount bookstore and coffeehouse located off-campus in the Old Ottawa South neighbourhood, and The Wing, a pop-up convenience store located in the Nideyinàn Atrium, adjacent to Rooster's.

==== Rideau River Residence Association ====
Undergraduate students living in the university's residence facilities are also members of the Rideau River Residence Association (RRRA). Founded in 1968 and incorporated in 1976, students elect a three-member executive consisting of a President and Vice Presidents for Programming and Administration respectively, in addition to floor representatives to the RRRA Council, which endeavours to represent the interests of Carleton's undergraduate residents. RRRA hosts a variety of events for students in residence, including an annual formal, and runs Abstentions, a convenience store located in Teraanga Commons.

==== Graduate Students' Association ====
All of the university's graduate students are members of the Carleton University Graduate Students' Association (GSA), Canadian Federation of Students Local 78. Graduate students elect an executive and council members to represent their respective interests within the organization, which in turn advocates on their behalf and provides a variety of services that cater to postgraduates, which include the operation of a Grad Lounge and Mike's Place, a student pub located in Nideyinàn specializing in Anglo-Indian cuisine, namesake of late Prime Minister and former Chancellor Lester B. Pearson. The GSA is also responsible for the provision of access to a variety of office services for graduate students.

=== Fraternities and sororities ===
Since 2007, most Greek activities at Carleton are overseen by the Carleton University Greek Council (CUGC), a student-led organization which plans and coordinates social, philanthropic, and academic events throughout the school year between fraternities and sororities. Three international sororities, Phi Sigma Sigma, Alpha Omicron Phi, and Delta Phi Epsilon are governed separately by the Carleton Panhellenic Council, which fulfills a mandate parallel to that of the CUGC.

==== Newspapers and magazines ====
Carleton's primary undergraduate student newspaper is The Charlatan, which was founded in 1945 and known as The Carleton until 1971. Until 2019, the newspaper published print editions on a bi-weekly basis when budgetary restraints forced the paper to reduce its frequency to once monthly. The Charlatan's operations are overseen by a volunteer Board of Directors, composed of representatives from the newspaper's staff, students, faculty, and the community at large.

Carleton is also served by The Leveller, a monthly newspaper established in 2009, representing student voice throughout the National Capital Region. The publication is characterized by its radical left editorial stance toward social issues.

During the school year, the School of Journalism publishes a community newspaper, Centretown News, which reports on the Centretown neighbourhood of Ottawa, and an online newspaper, Capital News Online.

The Department of English Language and Literature supports the student-run writers' zine, In/Words, featuring creative writing and short stories from Carleton students. Engineering students are similarly are served by The Iron Times, which is published by the Carleton Student Engineering Society.

==== Broadcasting ====
Carleton is home to a community radio station, CKCU-FM. Since its first broadcast in November 1975, CKCU-FM was the first licensed community-based campus radio station in Canada. CKCU-FM broadcasts a broad range of student and multicultural programming, featuring genres such as world music, avant-garde music, indie pop, and blues. In addition to an optional student-levy, CKCU-FM relies largely relies on donations from the local community and program sponsorships for financial support.

==== Theatre ====
The Sock 'n' Buskin Theatre Company, which was founded in 1943, is Carleton's amateur theatre company, having distinguished itself as one of Carleton's most important cultural fixtures. The Company puts on diverse showcase of theatrical productions each year, with recent productions including The Crucible, As You Like It, Twelfth Night, and Angels in America. Sock 'n' Buskin is entirely run and governed by student volunteers, who also comprise the actors and stage managers involved in each production.

== Athletics ==
Carleton competes as the Carleton Ravens, participating in intercollegiate competitions at both the national and provincial levels. Carleton is a member of both U Sports and Ontario University Athletics, with some teams competing in the RSEQ, encompassing 13 varsity sports.

=== Men's basketball ===
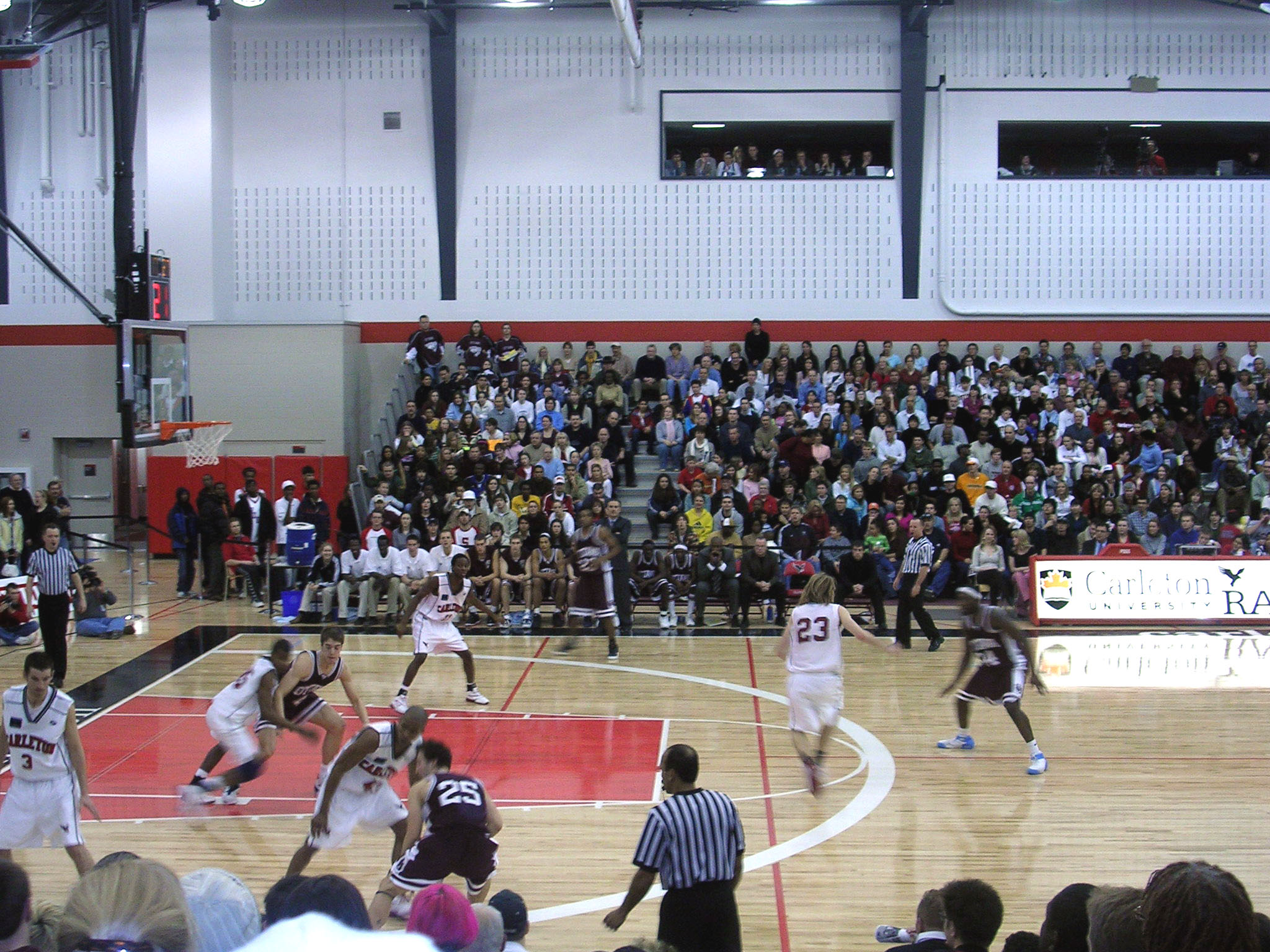
Basketball game between the Carleton Ravens and Ottawa Gee-Gees, 2005

Carleton is recognized for the strength of its men's basketball team, The Ravens. Between 1999 and 2019, Dave Smart served as the head men's basketball coach at Carleton, and is credited for building the team's capacity to its current reputation of repeated success. Smart resigned from his position in 2019 to serve as Carleton's director of basketball operations.

=== Women's basketball ===
The Ravens' basketball strength continues to the women's side with Carleton being home to the 2018, 2023 and 2024 U SPORTS National Championship. The team, previously coached by now men's coach Taffe Charles, is coached by Dani Sinclair.

The Ravens women's team has helped to develop a number of professional players including Marlee Ball, Nicole Gilmore, Alyssa Cerino and Catherine Traer.

=== Football ===
Carleton established a football team during the 1945–46 academic year, losing 15–0 to Macdonald College during its debut match. In tandem with basketball and hockey, Carleton's football matches transformed into a staple of student life at Carleton during the early years of the school, securing funding for sports equipment early in the school's history. In 1959, Carleton's move to the Rideau campus provided the team with updated facilities, including a field, training room, and equipment room.

In 1955, the football team began competing in the much-celebrated annual Panda Game against their rivals, the Ottawa Gee-Gees. The game evolved into an iconic highlight within student life at Carleton, gaining a sordid reputation for heavy drinking and outlandish parties. In 1999, the cancellation of Carleton's football program placed the game on indefinite hiatus, though was eventually revived in 2013. Since 2014, the game has taken place at TD Place in Lansdowne Park. While Ottawa holds a historical advantage over Carleton in terms of Panda Game victories, the current iteration of the Panda Game saw four consecutive victories for Carleton between 2014 and 2017. Ottawa won all six games held from 2018 to 2024, with the 2020 edition of the game being cancelled due to the COVID-19 Pandemic. In 2025, Carleton broke this streak by winning in front of a sellout crowd.

=== Other sports ===
The Carleton Ravens men's ice hockey team plays within the Ontario University Athletics conference of U Sports. Carleton also maintains a rivalry with the University of Ottawa in this field, having competed in the annual Colonel By Classic at TD Place Arena since the tradition began during the 2016–17 academic year for the men's team, and during the 2018–19 academic year for women.

The Ravens women's hockey team plays within the RSEQ.

Carleton is also home to a soccer program which recently won silver at the 2021 U SPORTS Men's Soccer Championship. The men's soccer team has won silver three times, 2021, 2002 and 1984. The team reached the final-eight tournament in four consecutive tournaments from 2017 to 2021.

Carleton's men's and women's fencing teams compete on the OUA circuit. The men's team won its most recent championship in 2015, while the women's team won its most recent championship in 2013.

In 2024, the women's Nordic ski team camptured the programs second CCUNC Championship at the Nordique Canada Championships. A dynasty in its own right, the team has won seven of the last eight OUA Women's Championships.

== Notable alumni and faculty ==
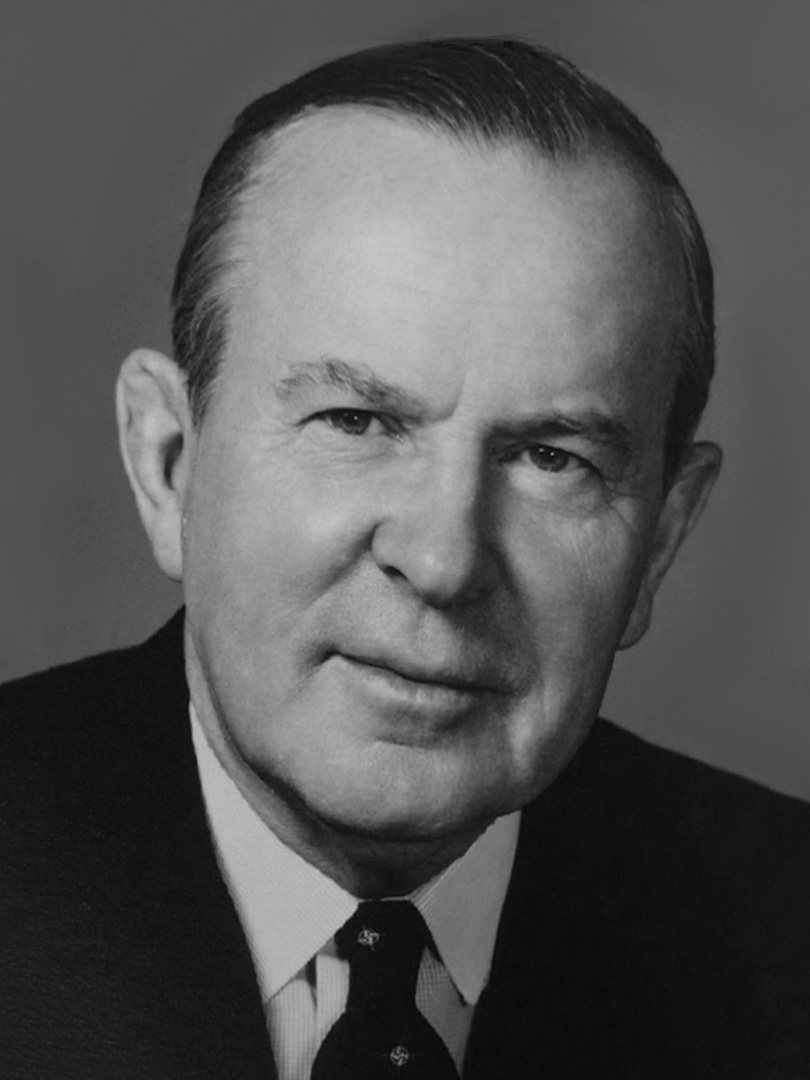
Lester B. Pearson, 14th Prime Minister of Canada

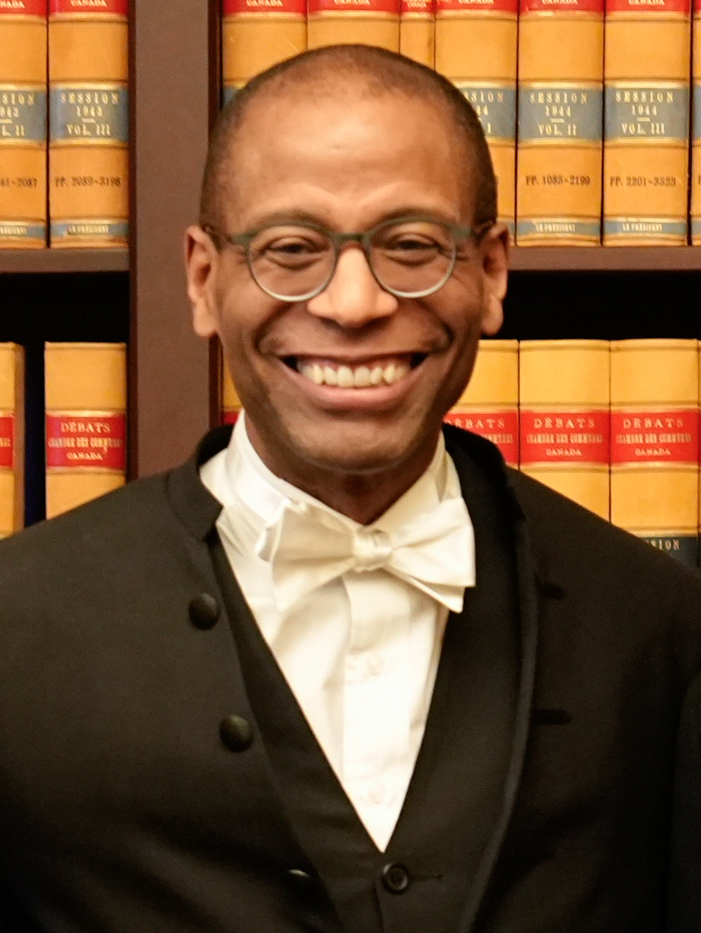
Greg Fergus, former Speaker of the House of Commons of Canada

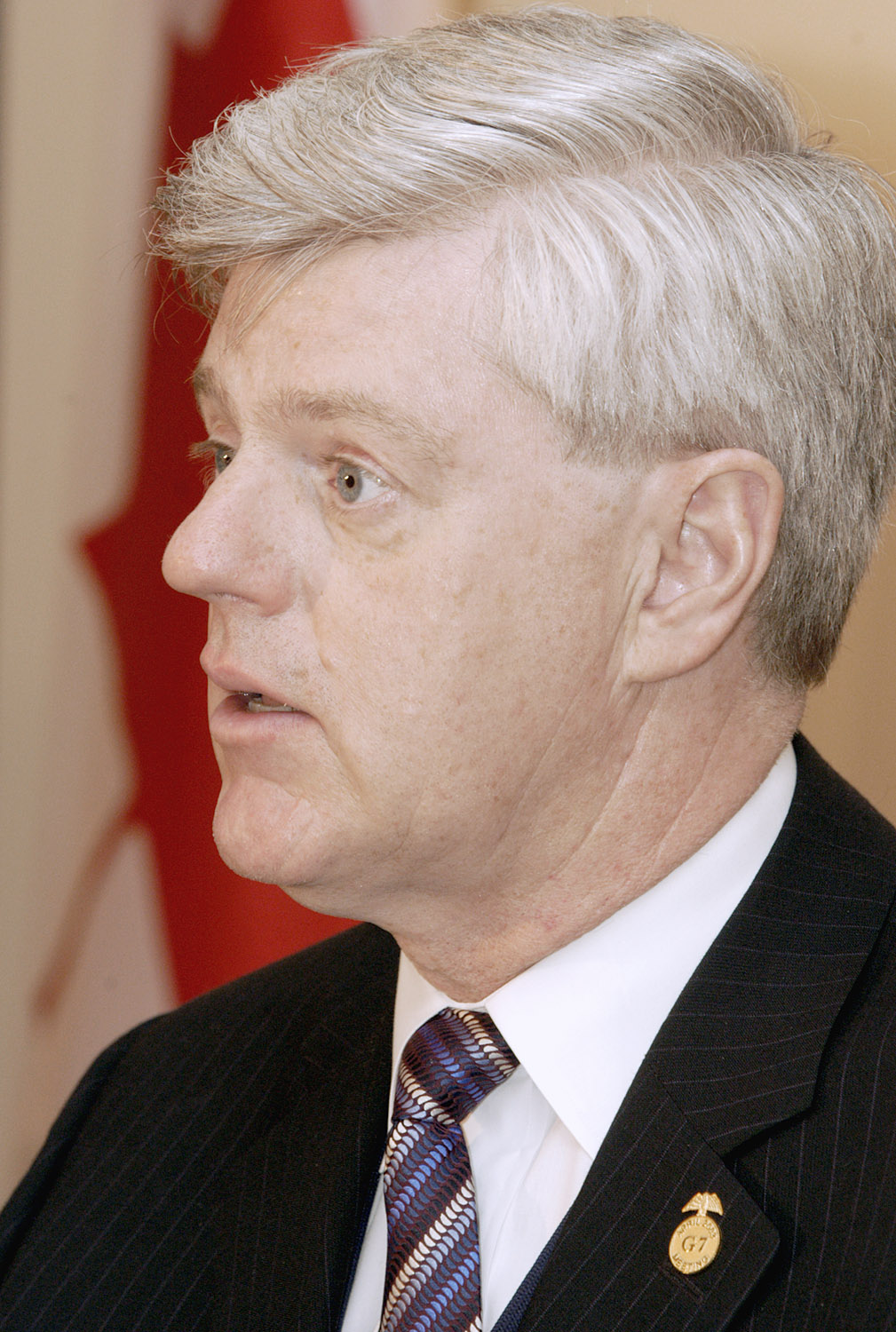
John Manley, former Deputy Prime Minister of Canada

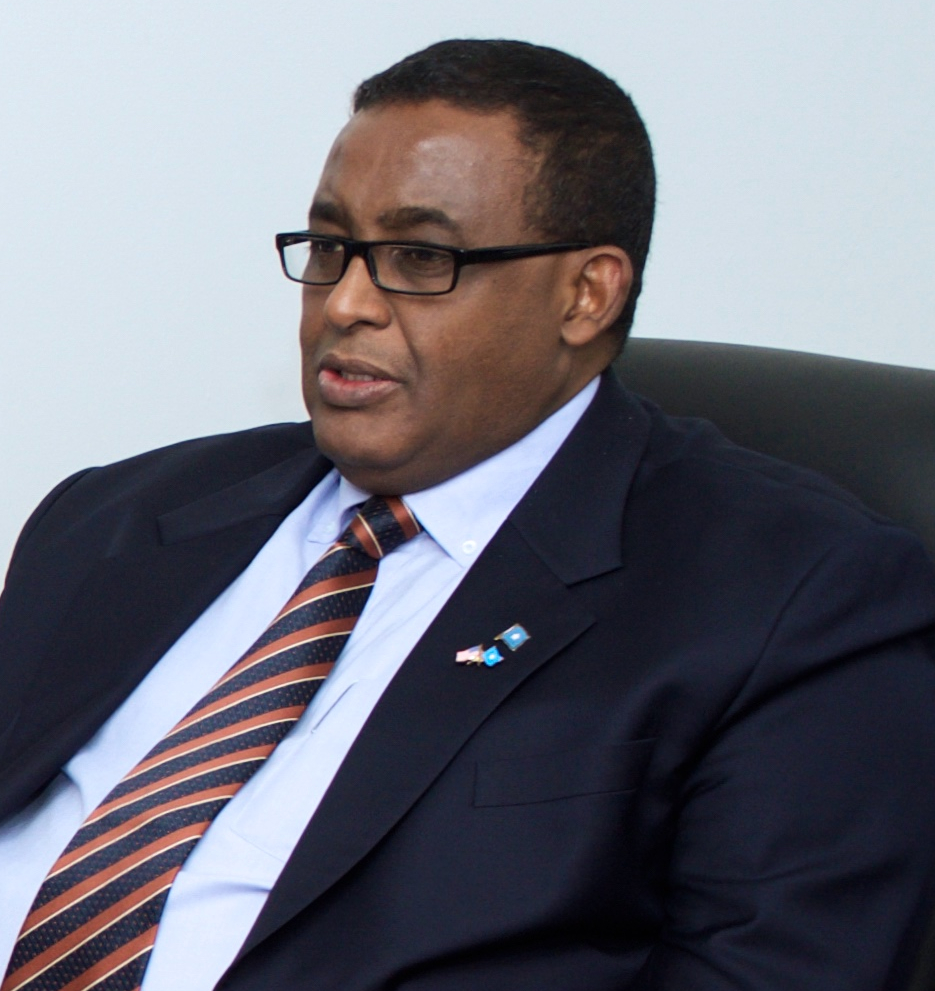
Omar Sharmarke, former Prime Minister of Somalia

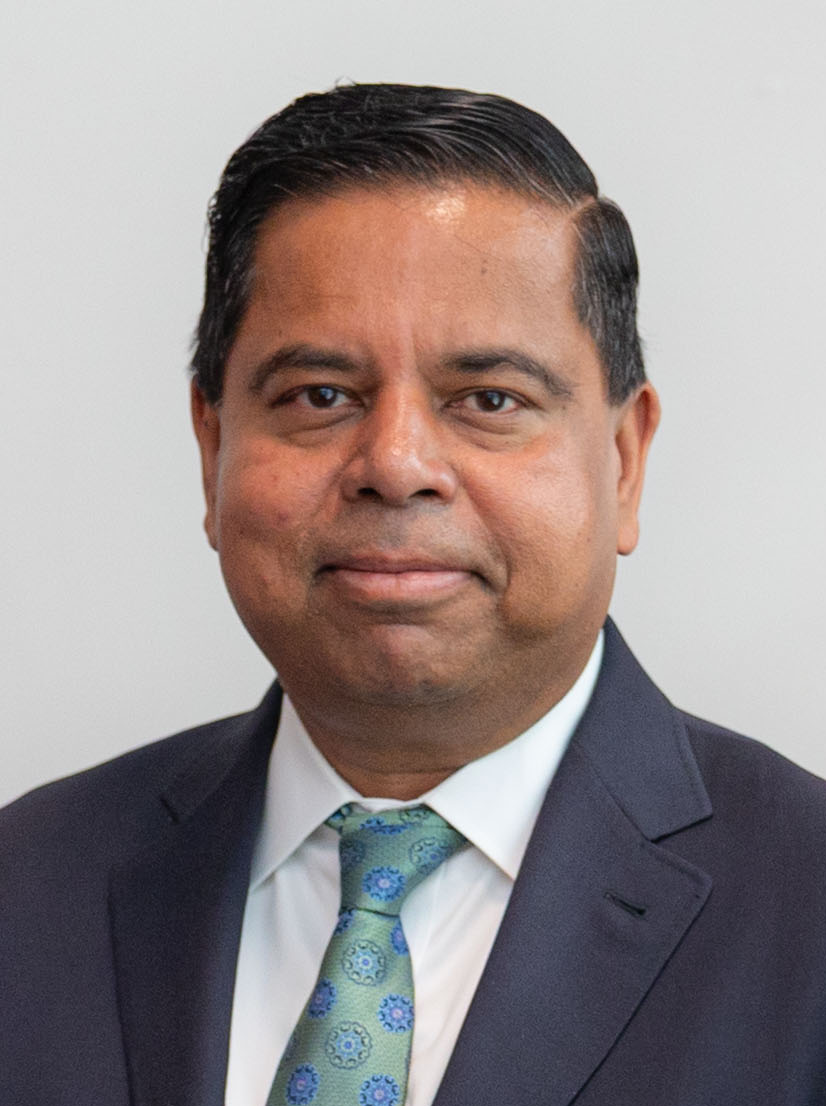
Gary Anandasangaree, Minister of Public Safety

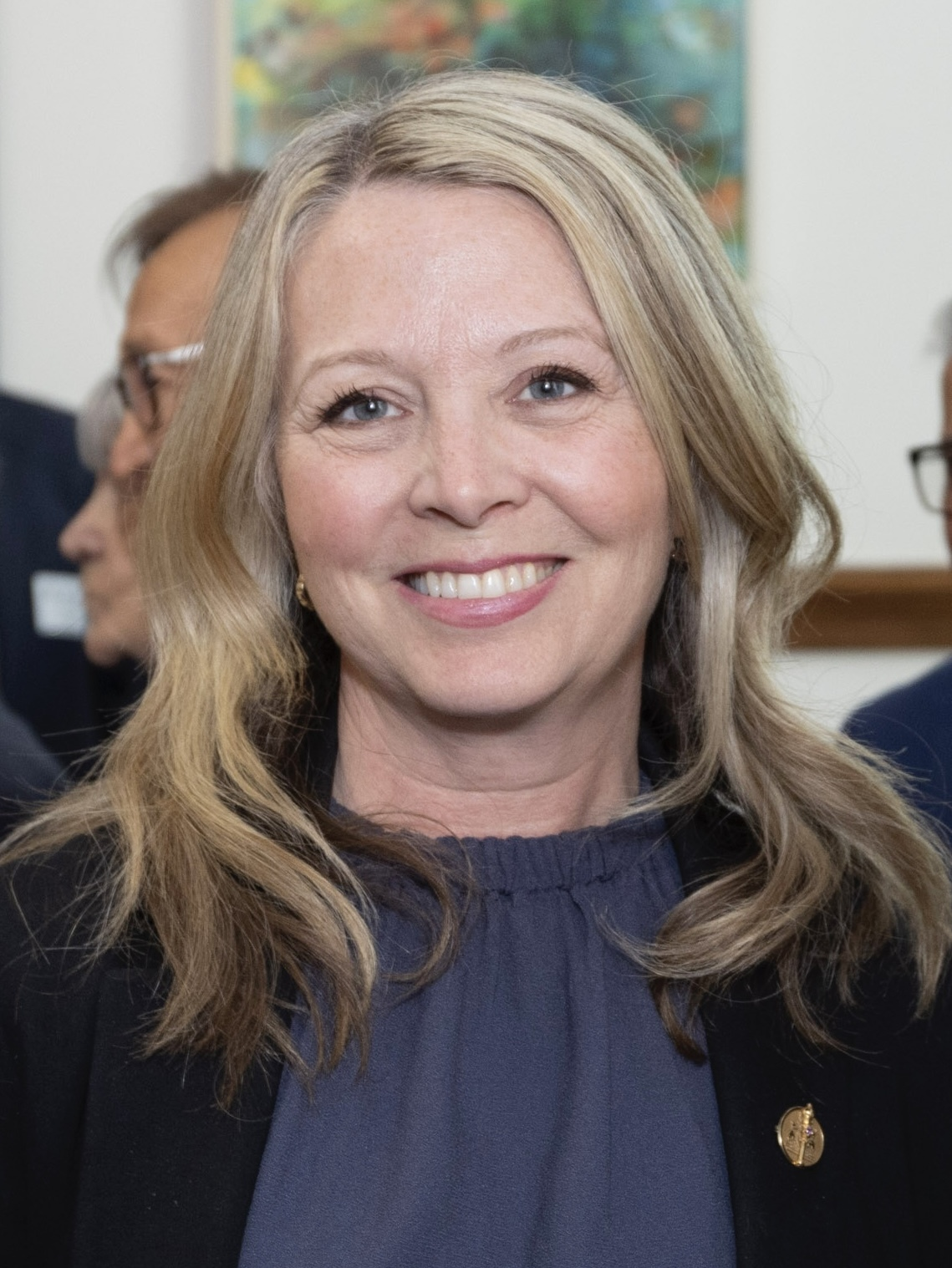
Marit Stiles, Leader of the Opposition in Ontario

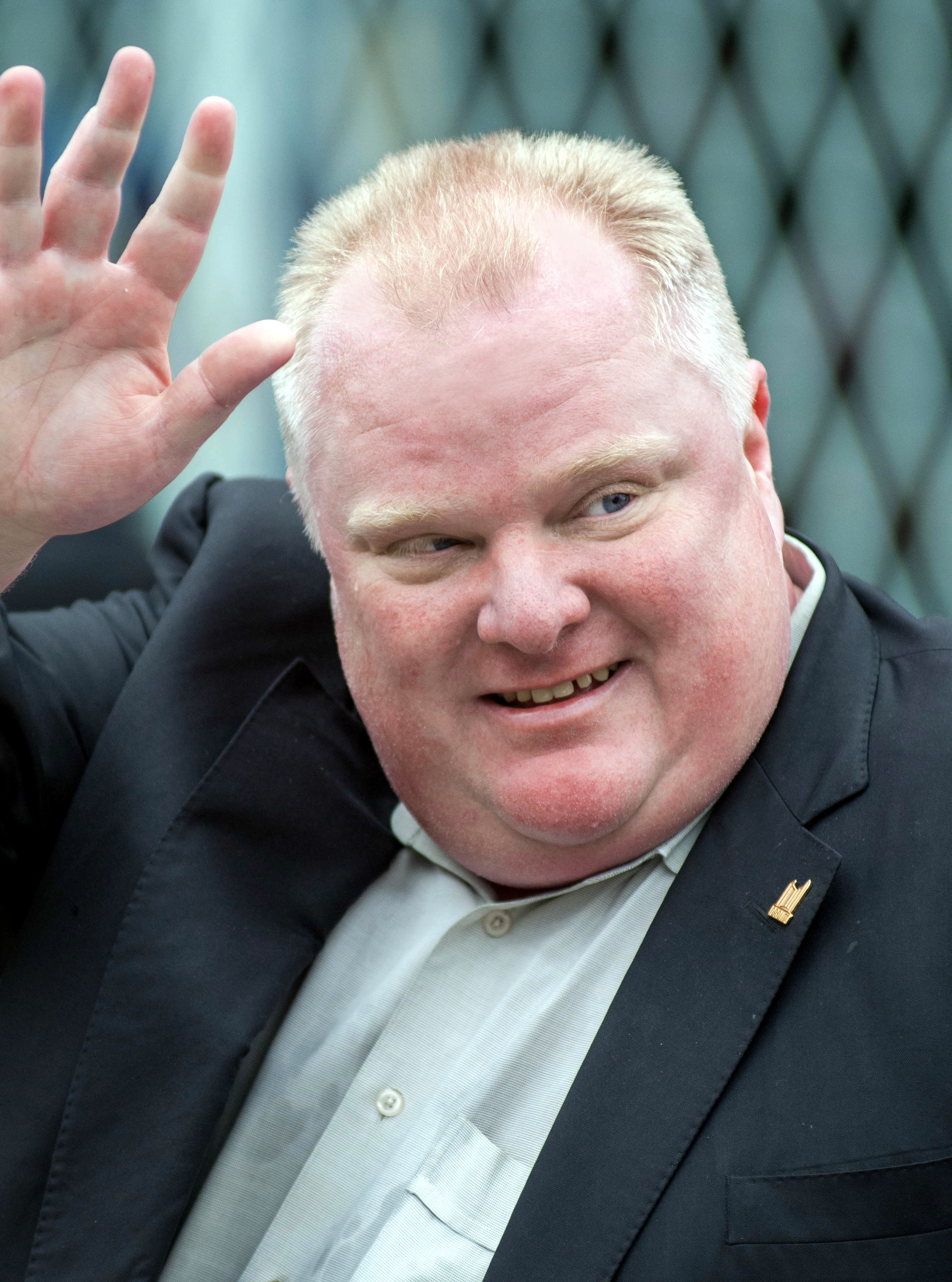
Rob Ford, former Mayor of Toronto

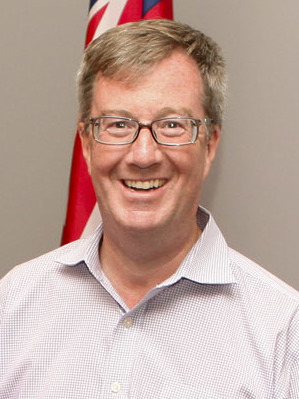
Jim Watson, former Mayor of Ottawa

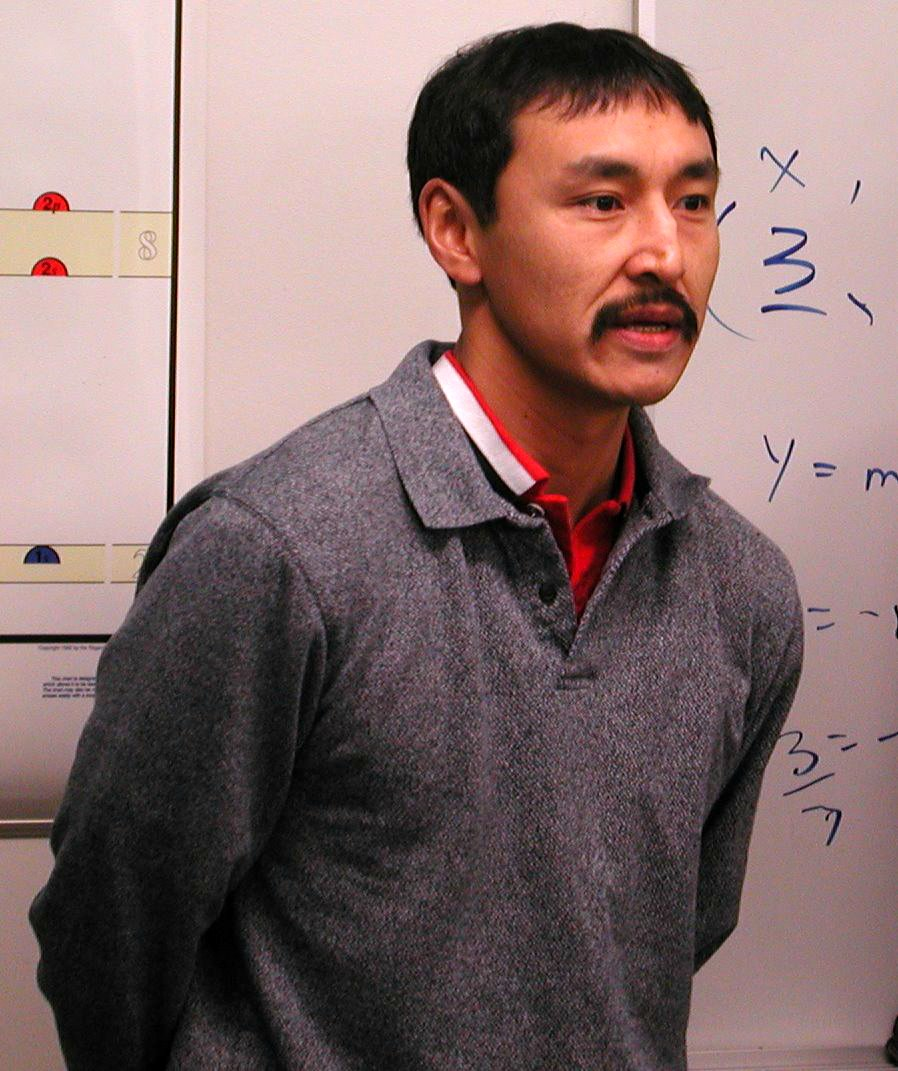
Paul Okalik, former Premier of Nunavut

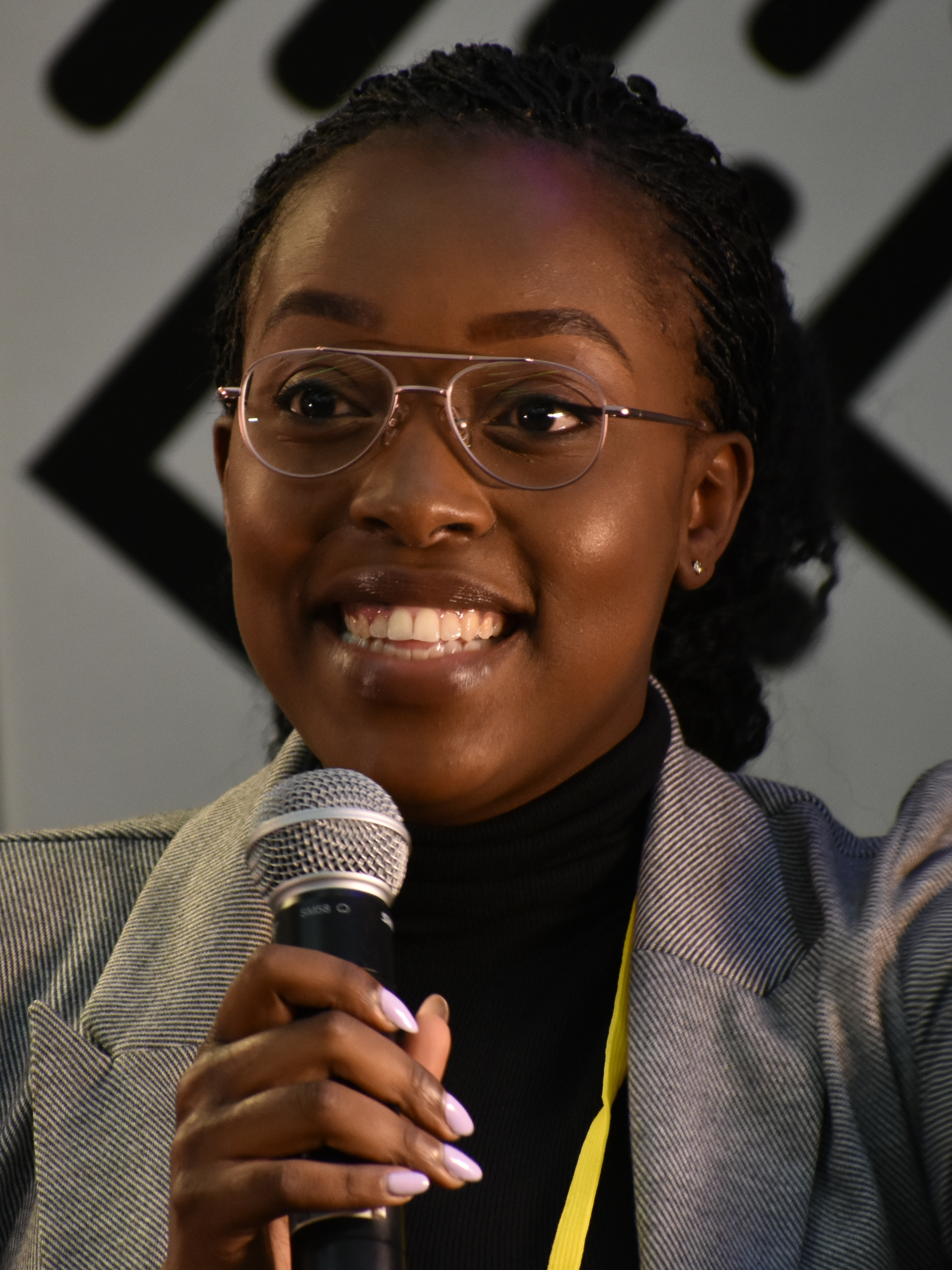
Arielle Kayabaga, Leader of the Government in the House of Commons of Canada

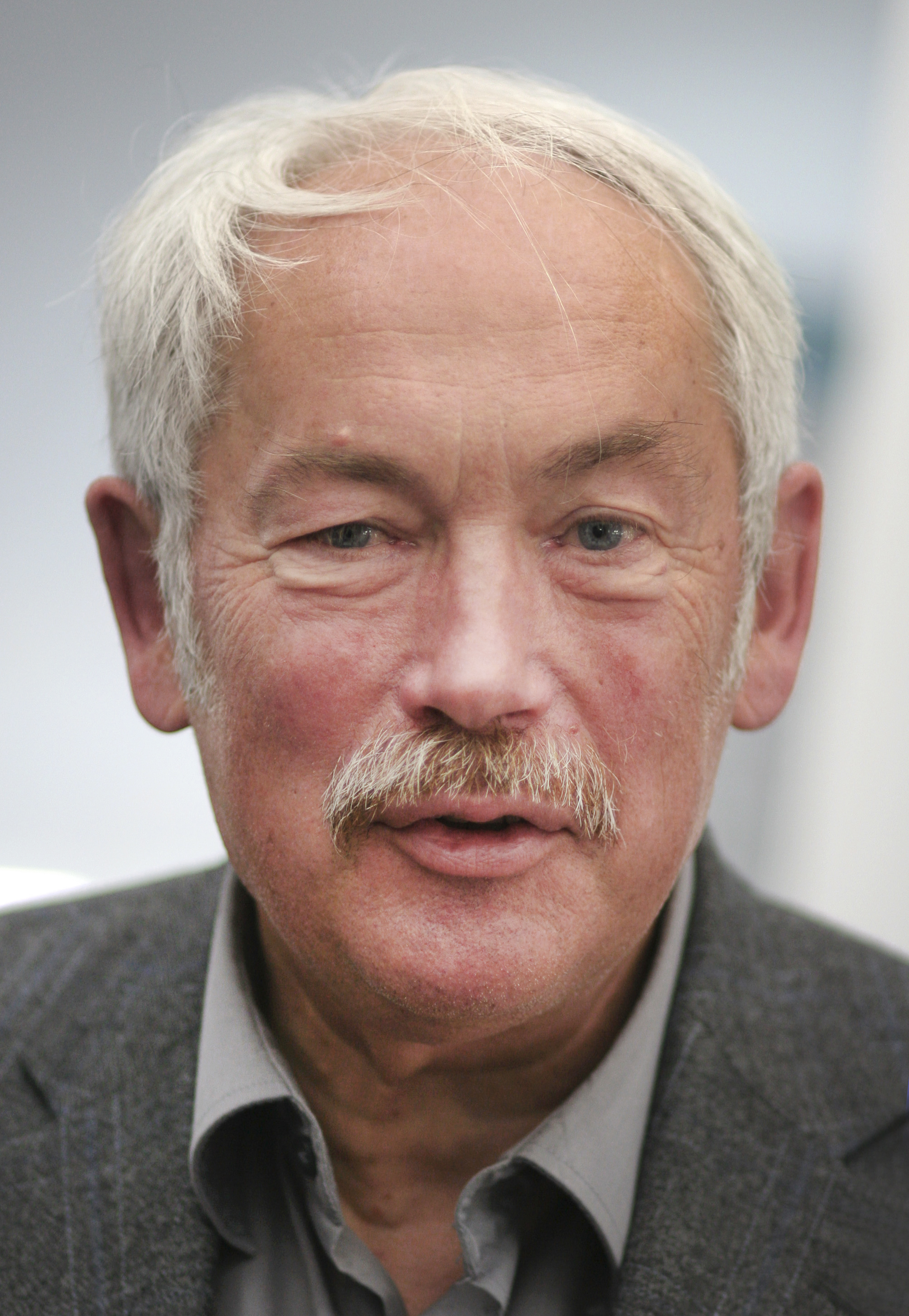
Peter Grünberg, Nobel laureate in physics

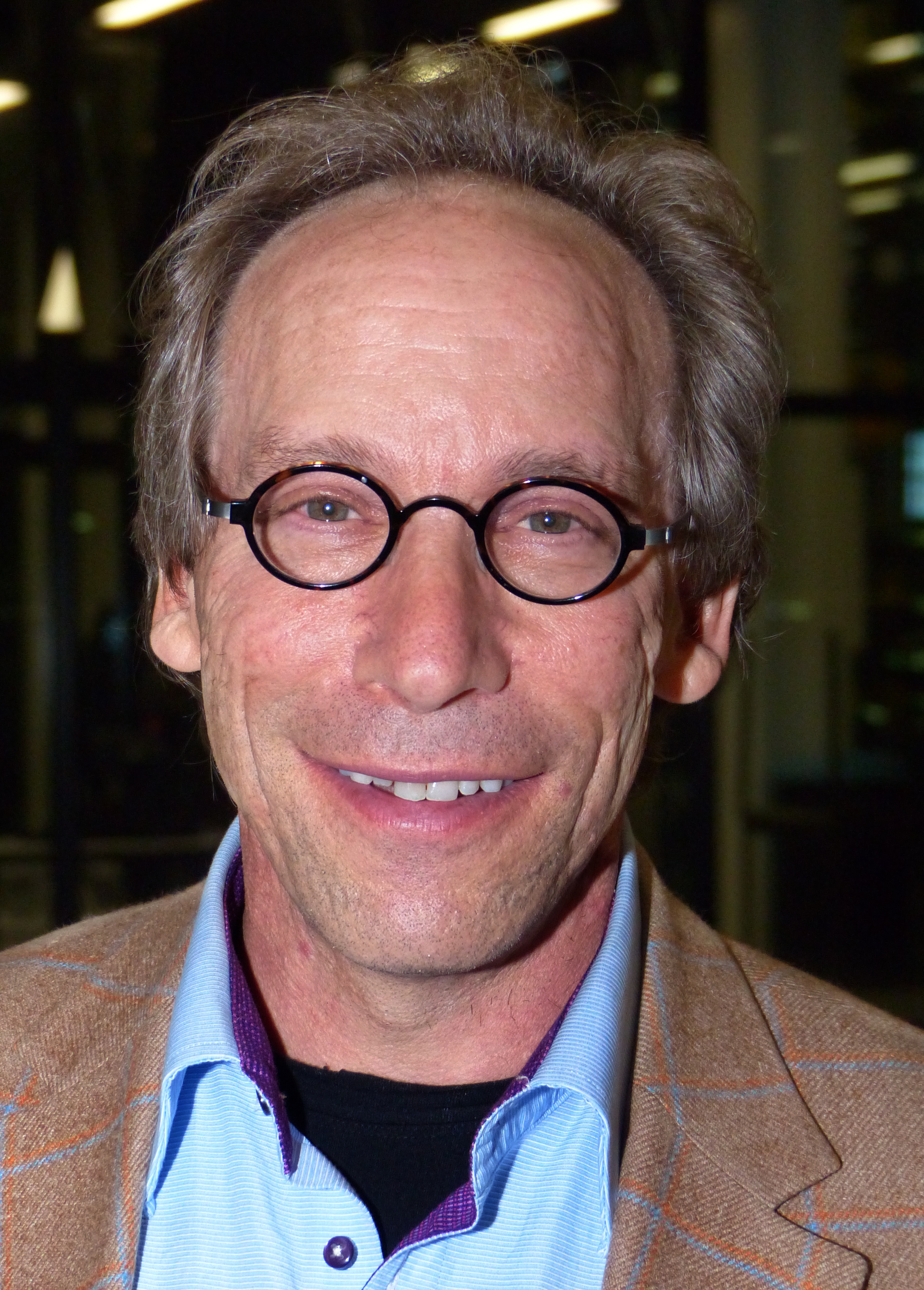
Lawrence Krauss, theoretical physicist and New York Times bestselling author

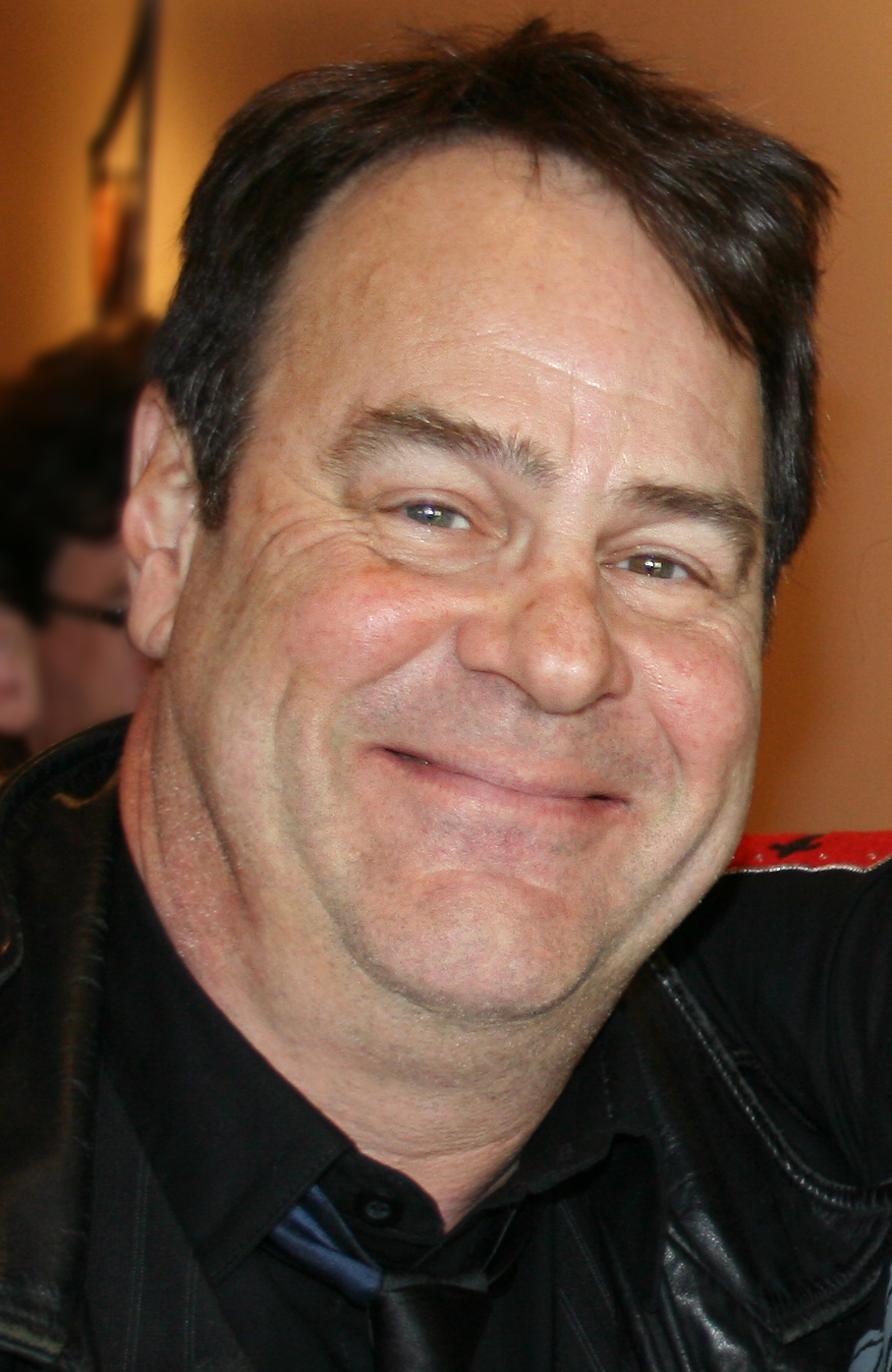
Dan Aykroyd, Academy Award–nominated actor

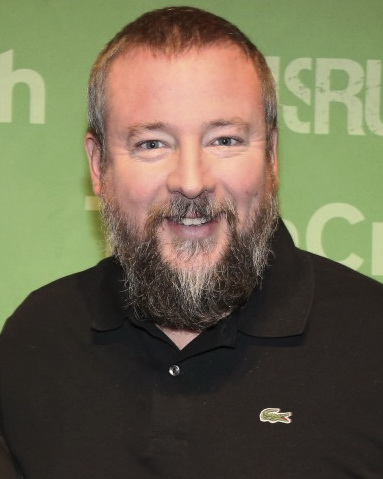
Shane Smith, founder of Vice Media

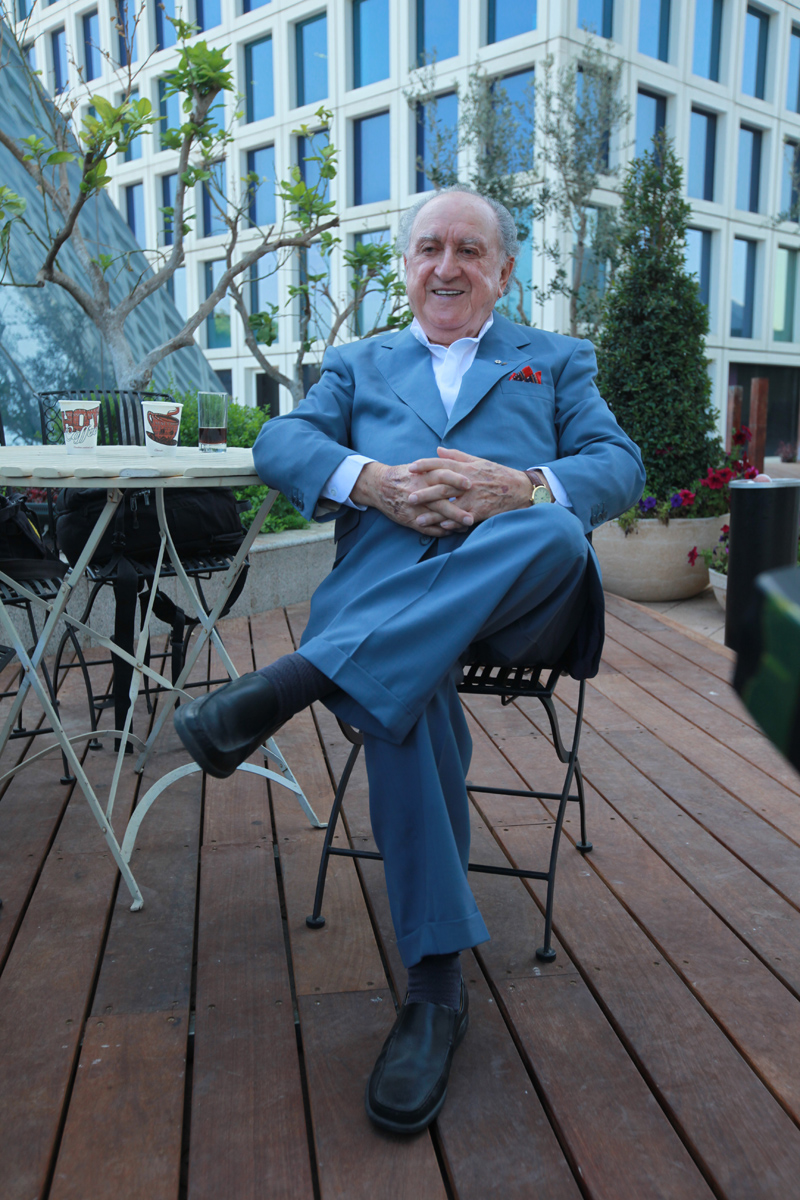
David Azrieli, Canadian real estate tycoon

=== Notable faculty ===
Past faculty include three Nobel laureates (pioneering scientists in physics and chemistry Gerhard Herzberg and Peter Grünberg and the former Prime Minister of Canada, Lester B. Pearson) as well as six Order of Canada recipients.

=== Chancellors ===
The Right Honourable Herb Gray, Canada's longest-serving continuous Member of Parliament, former Cabinet minister in the Trudeau, Turner, and Chrétien governments, former Deputy Prime Minister, and acting Leader of the Opposition, was the 10th Chancellor of the university. Gray was succeeded as Chancellor by Charles Chi (BEng '88), a venture capitalist and executive chairman of Lytro. His company has designed a revolutionary new camera that uses light field technology. Yaprak Baltacioğlu, former Secretary of Treasury Board Secretariat, was named the university's 12th Chancellor in December 2018. In 2022, Chancellor Professor Lenore Fahrig was awarded the prestigious Herzberg Prize for outstanding contributions in the field of conservation biology. She is the first Carleton faculty member to win the award.

=== Notable alumni ===
Carleton has produced notable graduates across numerous disciplines, including politicians, journalists, lawyers, entrepreneurs, architects and entertainers. Journalism being one of Carleton's traditional fortes, many of its alumni have gone on to leading positions in Canadian and international media outlets. These include Rosemary Barton and Andrew Chang, co-anchors of The National, Paul Watson, Pulitzer Prize–winning photojournalist, Greg Ip, chief economics commentator for The Wall Street Journal, Trina McQueen, founding president of the Discovery Channel, media mogul Conrad Black, Robert MacNeil, news anchor and journalist, Peter Worthington, Canadian News Hall of Fame inductee, Arthur Kent, Emmy Award–winning war correspondent, Nahlah Ayed, Middle East correspondent for the CBC, and Edward Greenspon, former Editor-in-Chief of The Globe and Mail. Moreover, Chairman of Vice Media Shane Smith founded the media company alongside alumnus Gavin McInnes. Alumnus Scott Burnside received the Elmer Ferguson Memorial Award for his career in ice hockey journalism.

Carleton alumni have served at all levels of government of Canada. These include the Speaker Greg Fergus of the House of Commons, the former Deputy Prime Minister John Manley, the former Premier Paul Okalik of Nunavut, the former Minister Peter MacKay of National Defence, the former Mayor Rob Ford of Toronto, and former Mayor Jim Watson of Ottawa.

In architecture, Gregory Henriquez of Vancouver is well known for his inclusive mixed-use rezonings and UNHCR social justice work. Paul Denham Austerberry, who graduated from Carleton's BArch program in 1989, won the Academy Award as well as the BAFTA Award for Best Production Design on Guillermo del Toro's 2017 film The Shape of Water. Another notable alumnus, Israeli-Canadian real-estate billionaire and architect David Azrieli, is the donor of the Azrieli Pavilion and the Azrieli Theater on campus.

Dan Aykroyd attended Carleton but did not graduate. In 1994, Aykroyd was conferred an honorary Doctor of Letters degree by the university. Comedian Norm Macdonald and journalist Peter Jennings also attended the university. Jennings was bestowed with an honorary doctorate in 1997. Other alumni in entertainment include the Canadian rapper k-os, Eisner Award–winning comics author Ryan North, YouTube personality Cristine Rotenberg, pop singer Mia Martina, actress Melody Anderson, and Grammy Award–winning setar player Kayhan Kalhor. While in the legal field, Louise Charron, a Puisine Justice of the Supreme Court of Canada, is also a Carleton alumna.

== Arms ==
Coat of arms of Carleton University
Notes Granted 5 November 1992 Crest A phoenix Gules quilled and beaked Or issuing from flames Proper. Escutcheon Sable a maple leaf Gules irradiated and charged with an open book Argent. Supporters On a grassy mount on either side a raven Sable beaked and membered Or armed Gules. Motto Ours The Task Eternal Badge On a sun in splendour Argent a maple leaf Gules charged with an open book Proper bound Or edged Bleu-Celeste.

== See also ==
- Canadian government scientific research organizations
- Canadian industrial research and development organizations
- Canadian university scientific research organizations
- Carleton Ravens
- Carleton School of Journalism
- Carleton O-Train Station
- Carleton University Students' Association
- The Charlatan, student newspaper
- CKCU-FM Radio Carleton
- Dominion-Chalmers United Church
- Higher education in Ontario
- List of Carleton University people
- List of colleges and universities named after people
- List of Ontario Universities
- Ontario Student Assistance Program
- Rideau River Residence Association
- U Sports
