= Architecture of Ottawa =

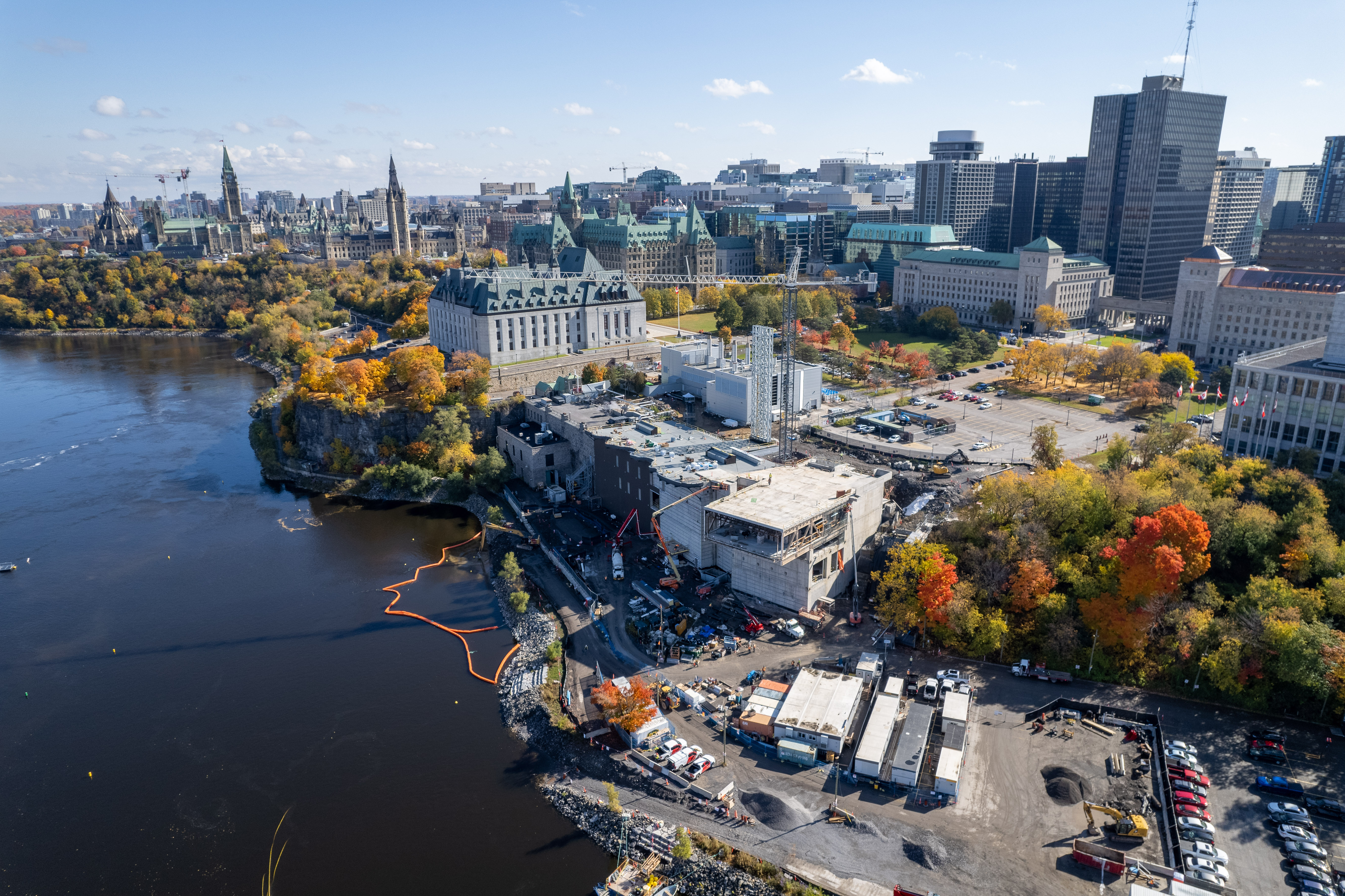
Skyline of downtown Ottawa from above the Ottawa River. The city is a mix of different architectural styles, varying based on what era the area was developed in.

The architecture of Ottawa is most marked by the city's role as the national capital of Canada. This gives the city a number of monumental structures designed to represent the federal government and the nation. As a historic city, the most significant architecture in the city centre tends to be Gothic Revival, Romantic and other Picturesque styles of architecture, with the Parliament Buildings, dating from the 1850s, being an example of Gothic Revival. Other buildings in the city follow formalistic and functional architectural styles.

Ottawa has always had a mix of different architectural styles, varying considerably based on what era a building or neighbourhood was constructed in. While founded in the early nineteenth century, few buildings outside of the Byward Market, Ottawa's old town, survive from that era and the vast majority of the city's structures date from the twentieth century. Much of the downtown was also greatly transformed in the 1960s and 1970s, and the swath of suburbs that surround the city also date from this period. Most of the city's remaining 19th century buildings are in the Byward Market, Parliament Hill, Sandy Hill, New Edinburgh, and to a lesser extent in Centretown. Areas such as the Byward Market and Parliament Hill allow the city to retain a certain European character despite the dominance of modern architecture.

== Urban planning ==
Unlike several other national capitals, such as Paris and Washington, D.C., Ottawa was never built to a master plan. However, several commissions have played a role in determining the shape of the city. Colonel By envisioned building several grand boulevards but the difficulties of expropriation and demolition prevented this from happening. In the late 1880s, Prime Minister Sir Wilfrid Laurier developed a 50-year vision of the city's future development and created the Ottawa Improvement Commission (OIC). The early years of the OIC under the direction of Montreal-born architect Frederick Todd saw the removal of industry along the canal, the definition of Patterson Creek and the transfer of Rockcliffe Park to the federal government. In 1913, Sir Robert Borden appointed the Sir Henry Holt Commission which was the first to state the need for a national capital region and also the removal of railway lines from the downtown core.

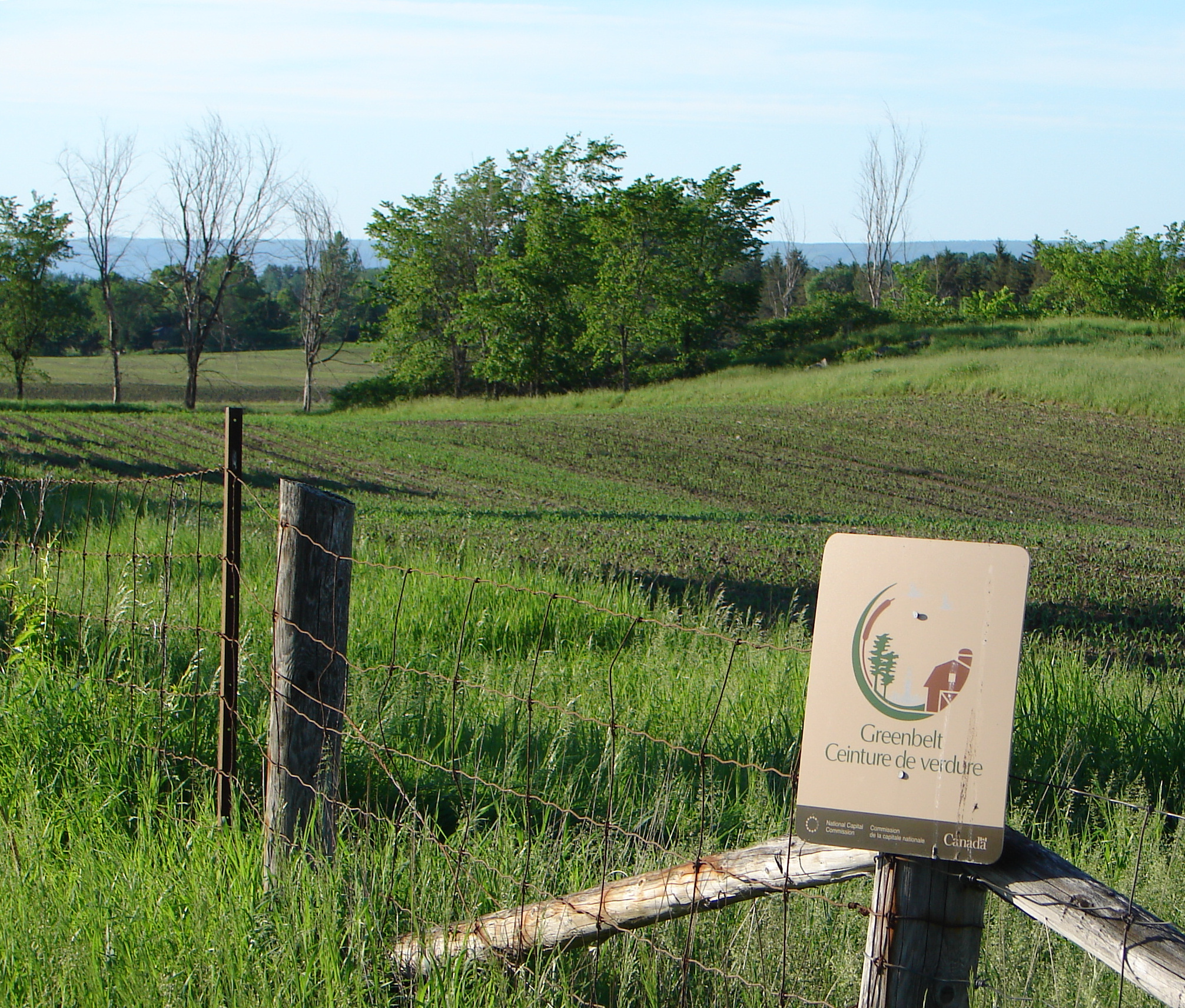
The Greenbelt is an area of protected green space within Ottawa. The Greenbelt emerged from the city's master plan in 1950.

Twenty years later, the Federal District Commission and Prime Minister Mackenzie King urged the federal government to acquire land, which eventually led to the creation of Confederation Square. In 1939, King invited Jacques Gréber to create a master plan for the city. This plan proposed new parkways along the Ottawa and Rideau Rivers, included the idea for the Greenbelt, and urged the need for a ceremonial route to Parliament but the plan was not approved until 1951 by the government of Louis St. Laurent. Gréber's Plan has mostly been implemented and still affects the city today.

In 1958, the National Capital Commission (NCC) replaced the Federal District Commission. As a federal agency, the NCC worked along with were then many individual municipal governments on the Ontario and Quebec sides in planning and designing the city. It acquired the lands for the Greenbelt and in the 1960s it removed the railway tracks from downtown, making rail travel less accessible, but also opening the Rideau Canal as a scenic tourist destination. The NCC continues to have a major role in planning and does have a long range plan for how to showcase the region as a national capital, but has limited legitimacy as an unelected bureaucracy.

The streets of central Ottawa follow a grid pattern, but it is frequently disrupted by the Rideau River and Rideau Canal, ensuring that few streets in most of the older neighbourhoods are very long. Outside of the core, the roads follow the modern standard of large avenues forming a grid, interspersed with a network of crescents and cul-de-sacs which create low-traffic, suburban neighbourhoods. The Queensway, a major highway, crosses almost all of the city from east to west, going just south of downtown. It was built in the 1960s, mostly over former railway tracks, and thus did not entail the same urban destruction as expressways in other cities. There are five road bridges, and one rail bridge, crossing over the Ottawa River, four of which are in the downtown area, ensuring that much of the interprovincial traffic, including many large trucks, pass through the centre of town.

Several planning decisions have played an important role in the development of Ottawa and its architecture. One long standing rule that had a great effect on the downtown core, was a prohibition on buildings being taller than the 92 metres (302 ft) tall Peace Tower. It was instituted to prevent the Parliament Buildings from being dwarfed by more modern structures. Therefore Ottawa's central business district does not have the towering buildings found in most other North American cities, instead having a considerable number of mid-sized towers.This rule however is relaxed outside the downtown area, resulting in tall structures across the city, such as the Claridge Icon in Little Italy.

Ottawa is home to a large Greenbelt circling the entire urban core. It was created as an attempt to limit sprawl and encourage density, with mixed success. The Greenbelt has remained largely intact, but Ottawa's newest suburbs such as Kanata, Barrhaven, and Orleans have jumped over the belt. The Greenbelt is increasingly becoming a wide avenue of green between two developed areas. Prior to amalgamation in 2000 the region was divided into several communities each with its own planning guidelines and the suburbs have distinct characters. Kanata is especially notable as developer Bill Teron's attempt to create a modern suburb embracing garden city principles.

=== Urban Design Review Panel ===
The Downtown Ottawa Urban Design Review Panel is a commission set up by the City of Ottawa to guide and raise architectural design standards within the downtown core. It was formed in 2005 and consists of seven architects and 3 landscape architects who review development proposals, suggest changes, and make approval recommendations. The panel is part of the city's official plan to improve the overall design standards through incentives such as awards and design competitions. But it received criticism for being ineffective. In December 2009, all seven architects on the panel resigned in protest to Ottawa City Council, stating "that they are wasting their time in a largely fruitless effort to improve architecture" and that "design doesn't matter to this pariticular council".

The panel was restructured on October 6, 2010. Ottawa's Urban Design Review Panel is now a permanent advisory panel made up of volunteer design professionals who perform a formal design review process and provide design recommendations for capital and private sector development projects that fall within the city's Design Priority Areas (no longer Downtown only). According to the panel's website, its purpose is to "enhance the City's capabilities in achieving architectural and urban design excellence."

== Institutional architecture ==
=== Federal government ===
The presence of the federal government has shaped every facet of the city of Ottawa, and its architecture has been dramatically affected for both good and ill. Ottawa exists as a major city almost solely because it was selected to be the capital of the new nation of Canada, and the federal government remains the dominant employer in the city. Many of Ottawa's most acclaimed structures are the result of federal government projects, but the affinity for cheapness and blandness of recent government buildings has also played a central role in Ottawa's perceived architectural dullness.

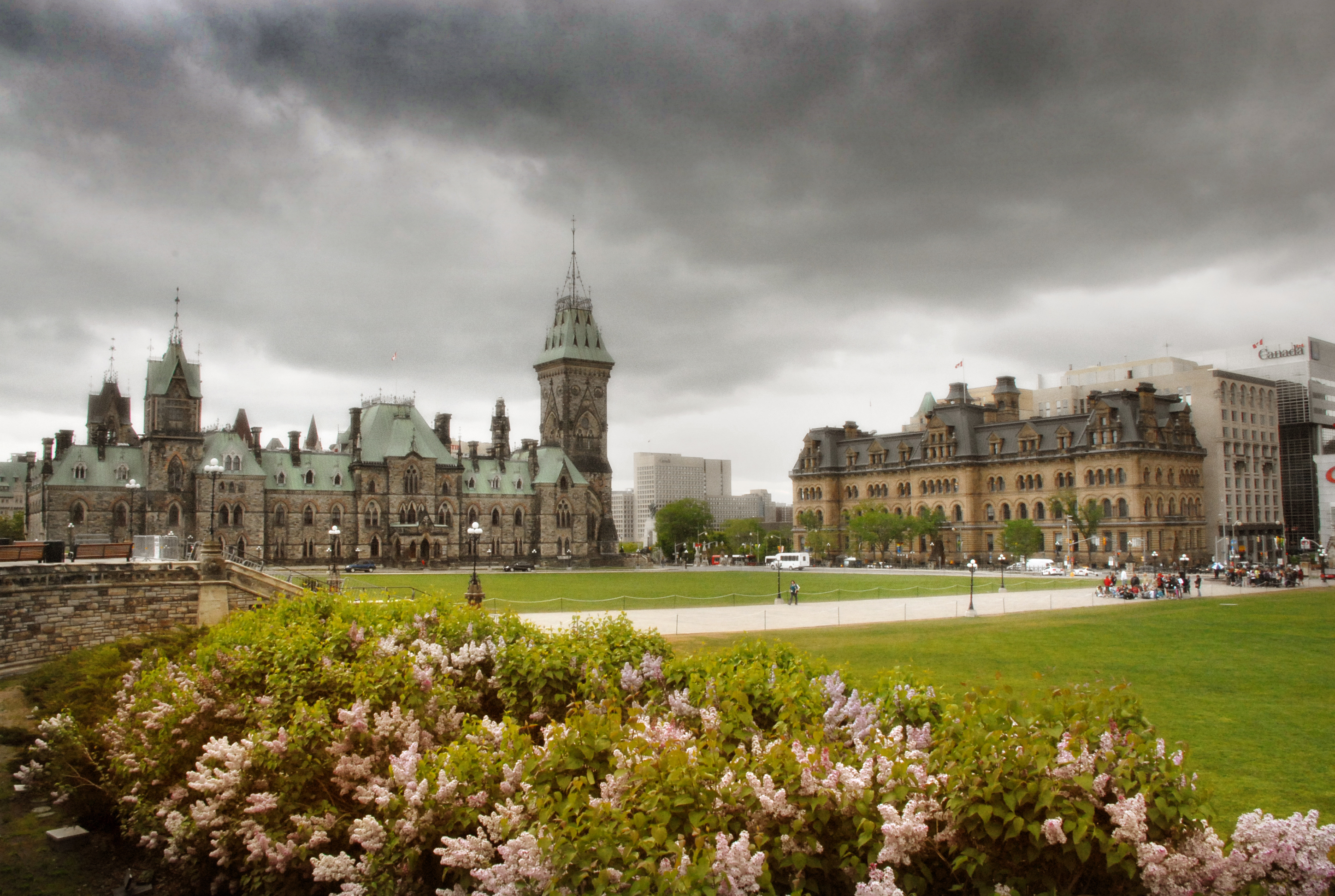
After Confederation, the federal government constructed a series of monumental structures, including the Victorian High Gothic Parliament buildings (left), and the Second Empire-styled Langevin Block (right).

In the years after Canadian Confederation, the Government of Canada constructed a series of monumental structures in Ottawa. The most important of these buildings was the Parliament of Canada, unquestionably Ottawa's most famous building and one also acclaimed by architectural critics. The parliamentary complex consists of a series of Neo-Gothic structures. They are one of the world's most prominent examples of Victorian High Gothic, with no attempts to ape medievalism, but rather a recombination of Gothic forms into a wholly original style of building. Early civil service buildings were built in similarly high style with the Second Empire Style Langevin Block and Baronial Connaught Building being two prominent examples. The Government of Canada Visitor Welcome Centre, a built addition to the parliament buildings as one of many ongoing projects on the site, and works to combine Neo-gothic and contemporary architectural styles in a way that blends the new architecture into its historical context.

Subsequent decades saw the federal government embrace modernism. The attitude towards government buildings also changed. In earlier eras, all government buildings were considered to be important symbols of the country, and designed to be both monumental and functional. However, by the 1960s, efficiency and cost effectiveness were the main goals of government projects. The many government structures built during this era thus tend to be models of International Style minimalism, unornamented, with no attempt at distinctiveness. Moreover, in an era of political discontent over high taxes it was even a priority that the buildings not be cheap, but also look cheap so that visitors from the regions wouldn't feel that the federal government was wasting their money in Ottawa. In this era the federal government decided to erect many of its new buildings outside of the downtown core. Partially for political reasons, the government of Prime Minister Pierre Trudeau opted to build a series of massive federal government office towers on the Quebec side of the border, most notably the Place du Portage and Terrasses de la Chaudière. In the western part of Ottawa a cluster of government buildings were built at Tunney's Pasture. The downtown core did see a great deal of building during this era, especially after the city eased its 150-foot height restriction on office towers. Examples include the Department of National Defence Headquarters by the canal and the Place de Ville complex, built by private developer Robert Campeau but largely housing government departments.

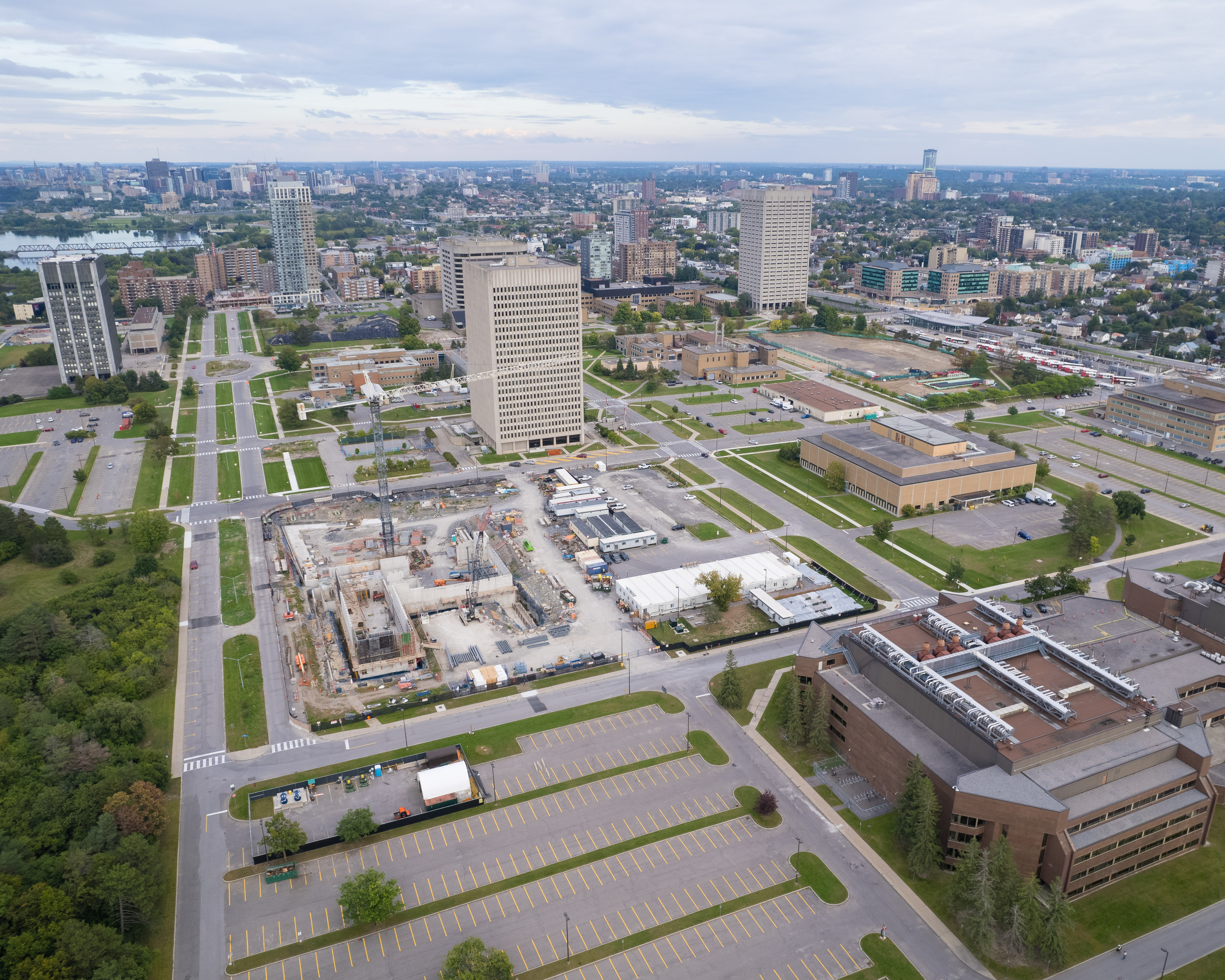
Tunney's Pasture is a cluster of government buildings in the western part of Ottawa. Most government structures built in the 1950s and 1960s were designed in a minimalist International Style.

Today the federal government has stuck with modernist simplicity for its functional buildings, but has turned again to monumental architecture for projects of national significance. Most notable are the three museums that have been built in the national capital over the last three decades. The new homes of the Canadian Museum of Civilization, National Gallery of Canada, and the Canadian War Museum are unique examples of postmodern architecture. All cost vast amounts of money, but they have also met with international acclaim. They also have allowed the capital to become a showcase for buildings by three of Canada's most prominent architects: Moshe Safdie, Douglas Cardinal, and Raymond Moriyama. The OPL and LAC Joint Facility is an ongoing project by the City of Ottawa, designed by Diamond Schmitt and KWC Architects whose form rejects traditional rectilinear geometry. The building's design is strongly connected to the natural landscape of the LeBreton Flats Area and will hopefully add to the list of critically acclaimed architecture found in Ottawa.

=== Universities ===
Ottawa's three universities, Carleton University, Saint Paul University and the University of Ottawa, encompass a wide variety of architectural styles.

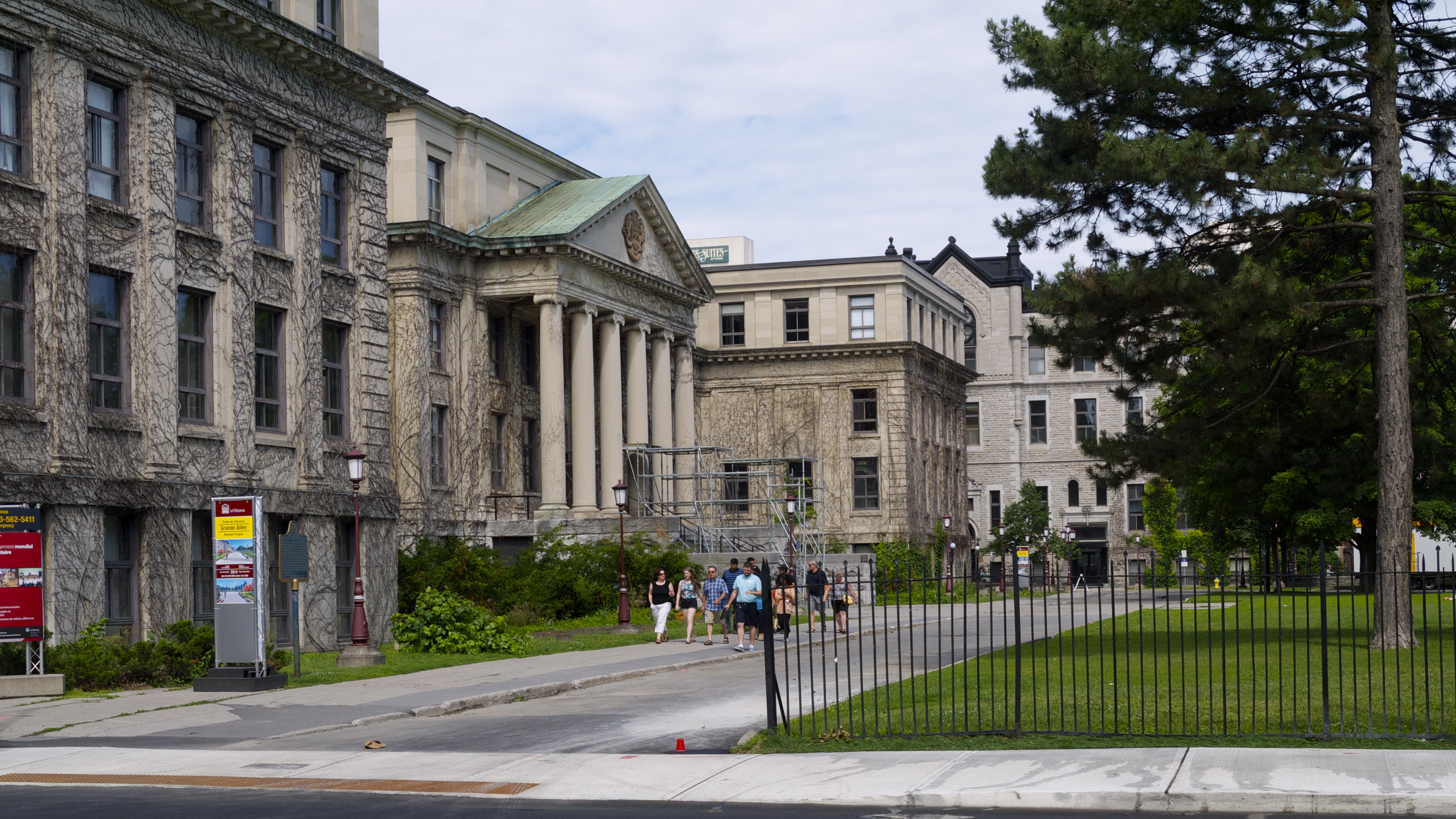
Tabaret Hall serves as the University of Ottawa's administrative building. Erected in 1905, the building is a neoclassical structure designed by A. Von Herbulis.

The University of Ottawa (U of O) was founded in the nineteenth century, reflected architecturally by the University's buildings of that era, including 100 Laurier, formerly the 'Juniorat du Sacre-Coeur', a college of the University once ran by the Oblates of Mary Immaculate. It currently houses the university's Department of Visual Arts and the University Gallery. Also notable is Tabaret Hall (erected 1905), a neoclassical building designed by A. Von Herbulis, which is an Ottawa landmark and also inspired the University's logo. The architecture of the U of O is also noted for its embrace of brutalism, including Morisset Hall, a massive poured concrete building that houses the central libraries of the University. The SITE Building completed in 1997, a highly postmodern structure that has attracted much acclaim, breaking with the University's late 20th century trend of modernist architecture. A newer project, the Desmarais building at the prominent intersection of Laurier and Nicholas, houses the Telfer School of Management and the Faculty of Arts.

Saint Paul University, an ecumenical Pontifical Catholic University which is loosely federated with the University of Ottawa, consists primarily of two buildings: Guigues Hall and Laframboise Hall. Both buildings have been constructed in the modern style, and are accompanied by a considerable amount of landscaping, as the Saint Paul campus is located on a prime spot along the Rideau River. The most notable building affiliated with Saint Paul University is the nearby Maison Deschatelets, a residence for religious scholars owned by the Missionary Oblates of Mary Immaculate.

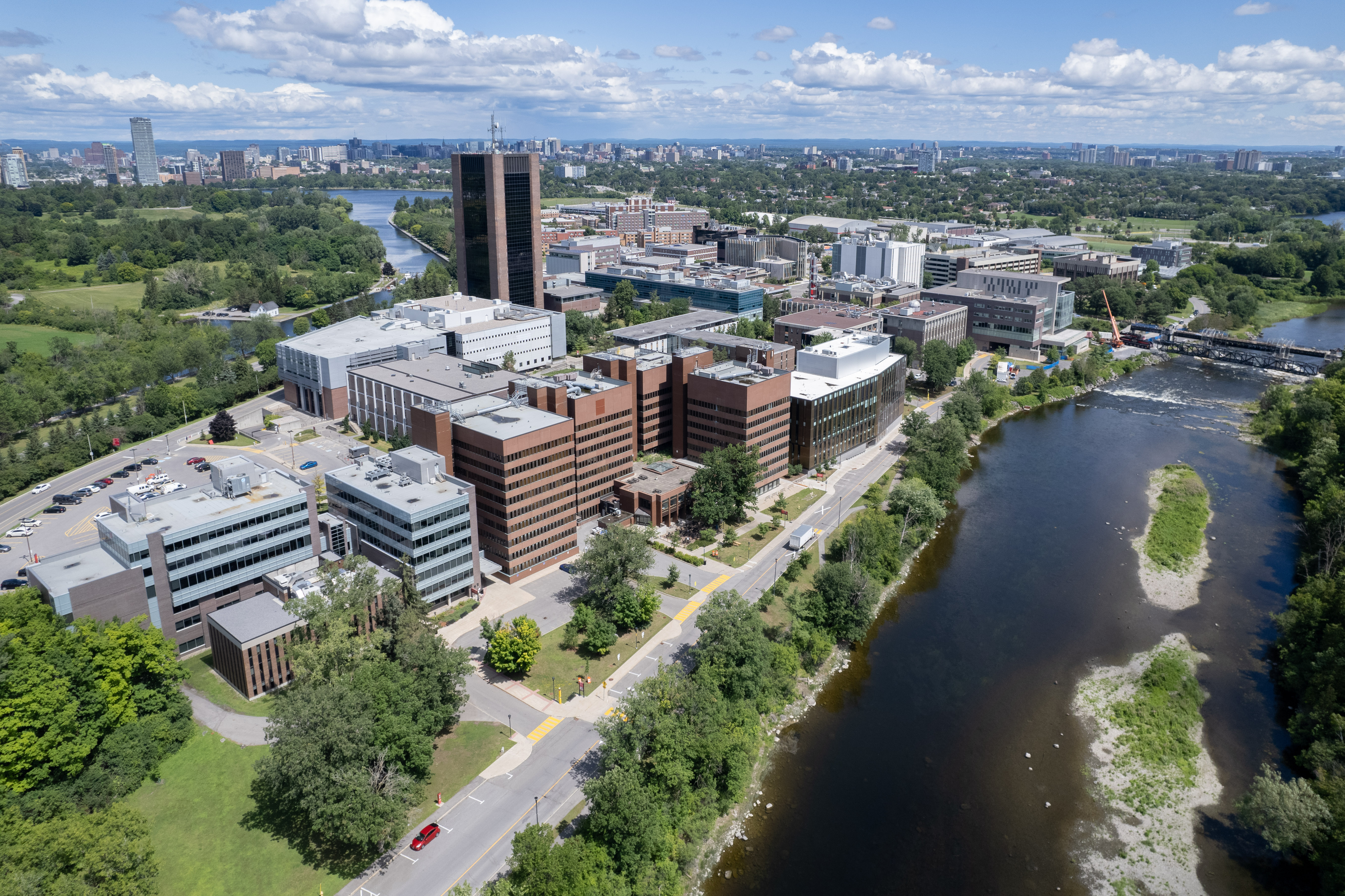
View of Carleton University, with its tallest building, Dunton Tower, in the background. The original design for Carleton University aimed to project the sense of egalitarian sensibilities.

Carleton University, founded in 1942, is located south of downtown on a verdant campus stretched between the Rideau Canal and Rideau River. It is itself home to one of Canada's premier schools of architecture. The design of Carleton's campus and buildings deliberately rejected monumentalism, focusing instead on the academic quadrangle, aiming to present an egalitarian rather than elite sensibility. The University's current building projects include the new residence Rideau House, which was officially opened in 2025. The tallest academic building in Ottawa is Carleton's Dunton Tower; completed in 1971, the international style building sits along one side of the quadrangle and is Carleton's most visible architectural landmark.

=== Embassies ===
Ottawa's role as the nation's capital also means that it is home to over a hundred foreign missions. These embassies have an important role in the city's architecture. Many embassies and ambassadorial residences are located in notable heritage structures.The former U.S Embassy on 100 Wellington Street for example has held a prominent location in Canada's parliamentary precinct, and has since been reclaimed as an Indigenous Peoples Space. Many of the old mansions built by lumber barons or early politicians now house embassies, and the foreign missions help keep many of these buildings in good condition. This is especially important in older parts of the city such as Sandy Hill and Rockcliffe Park. Examples include the Algerian Embassy in Fleck/Paterson House, the British high commissioner residence at Earnscliffe, and the High Commission of Brunei in Stadacona Hall. Those nations that choose to build a new structure to hold the embassy often incorporate local styles and motifs into their buildings, bringing added diversity to Ottawa's architecture. The new Saudi Arabian and Kuwaiti incorporate distinctly Middle Eastern design elements, while the American embassy is a distinctly Federal style structure.

== Domestic architecture ==
Ottawa's domestic architecture is dominated by single family homes. There are also smaller numbers of semi-detached, rowhouses, and apartment buildings. Most domestic buildings are clad in brick, with small numbers covered in wood or stone.

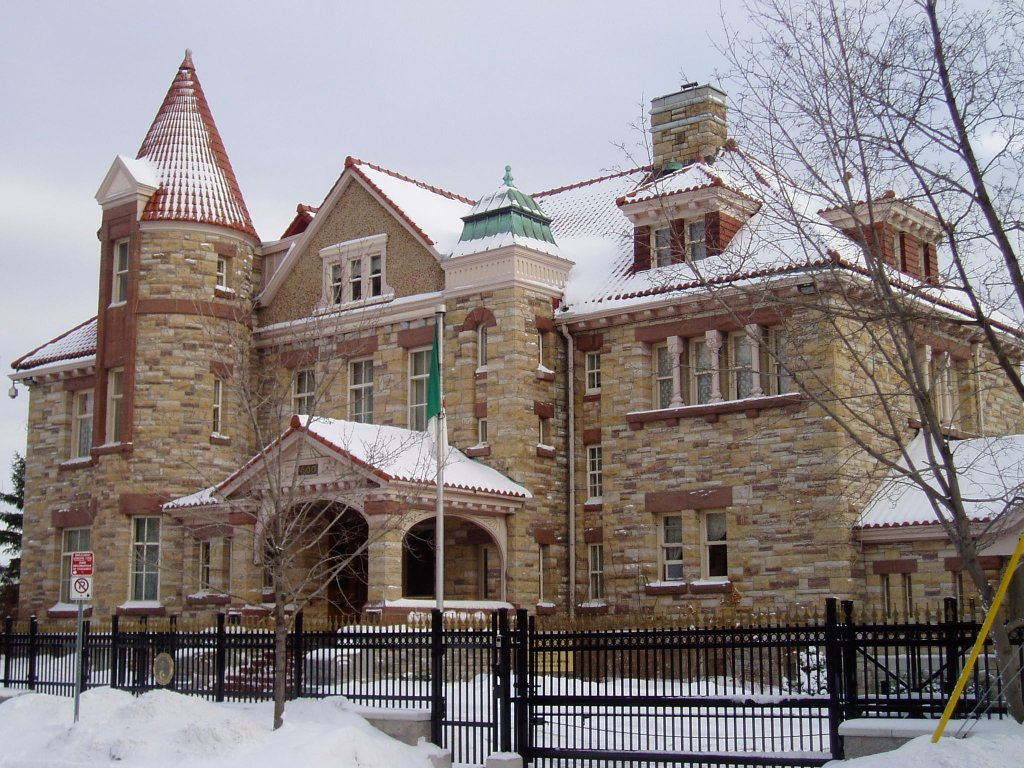
Fleck/Paterson House is an example of a Queen Anne Revival style residence. The residence presently serves as the Algerian embassy to Canada.

Ottawa has several older neighbourhoods clustered around the downtown core, including the Glebe, Sandy Hill, New Edinburgh, Centretown, Lower Town and Old Ottawa South. These areas were mainly built up in the late nineteenth and early twentieth centuries. The houses in these areas tend to be in Victorian or Queen Anne Revival style, but rarely have any conspicuous ornamentation. These are usually two- or three-storey single homes. Recent infills in these neighbourhoods have often taken the form of townhouses. Red brick, sometimes painted other colours, is the dominant surface material. Most houses have sizable lots, with a driveway running to a shed, or a small lane way running behind the buildings. In the 1920s and 1930s new styles were imported, and many houses from this era take inspiration from the Arts and Crafts and Prairie styles.

Like most of North American, the suburbs built in the years after the Second World War were dominated by the ranch house. Areas like Alta Vista and the older parts of Nepean are dominated by these quickly built single storey houses with a garage attached and little overt styling. More recent suburbs have moved to larger homes, generally with two or more stories and with more ornamentation, such as gables, dormer windows, and balconies. This neo-eclectic style dominates that rapidly growing areas outside the Greenbelt, such as Kanata and Barrhaven.

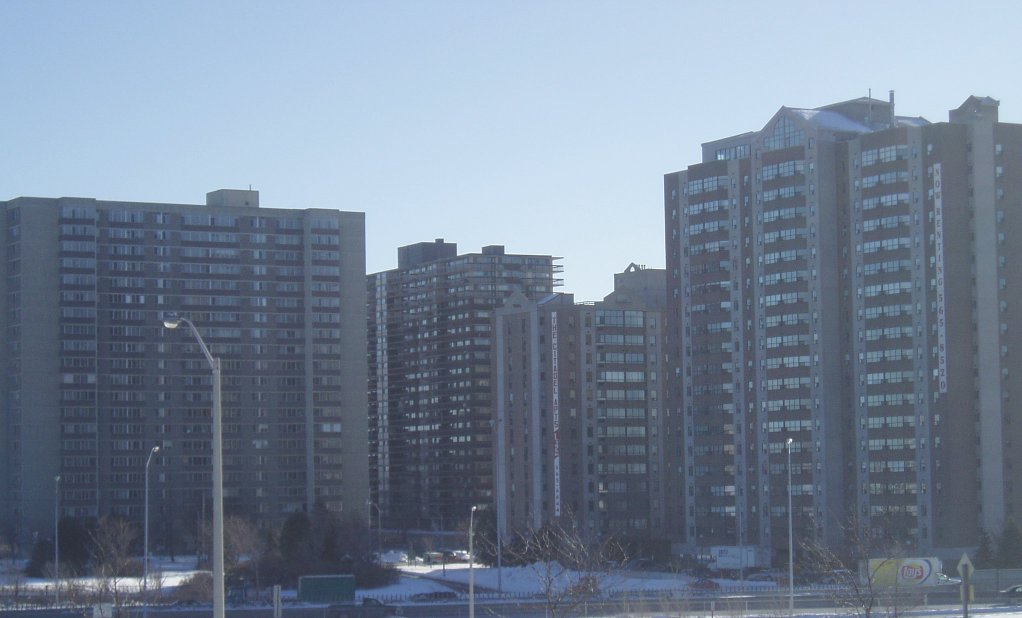
During the 1960s, clusters of buildings were placed in former industrial areas, including Lees Avenue.

Beginning in the 1960s, a number of large apartment buildings were erected in Ottawa, the first of these being the Juliana on Bronson St. which was built in 1962. During the years after the 1960s and 1970s Ottawa embraced a decentralized strategy, and while some of these buildings are located in the core, most are spread out across different parts of the city. Clusters of buildings were placed in former industrial areas such as Lees Avenue and Hurdman. Others were erected in the suburbs that were being built in this era such as Britannia in the west and Heron Gate in the south. The towers from this era share an almost universal design, brick or concrete facades unadorned except for the large numbers of balconies given to each suite. With the general recession in the Canadian real estate market of the 1980s and early 1990s most such developments halted. In the early years of the 21st century residential high-rises have returned, mostly in the form of condominiums. Ottawa has not seen as extensive a boom in condo construction as Toronto or Vancouver, but several prominent structures have been built including the Minto Metropole and a number of towers in the Byward Market area.

The Briarcliffe section of the Rothwell Heights was a showcase for modernist domestic architecture in the early sixties, thanks to the influence of architects Walter Schreier, Brian Barkham, James W. Strutt, Paul Schoeler and Matt Stankiewicz, as well as the area's proximity to the National Research Council, a magnet for international talent.

New residential developments in Ottawa include nationally significant structures featuring a modern sensitivity toward energy efficiency and sustainability. The first certified Passivehaus building designed and built in Canada for residential use was developed by Chris Straka of Vert Design Incorporated in 2010. The duplex, constructed in New Edinburgh adjacent to the Rideau River, demonstrates the integration of modern sustainable architecture into one of the city's oldest neighbourhoods.

== Commercial and industrial architecture ==
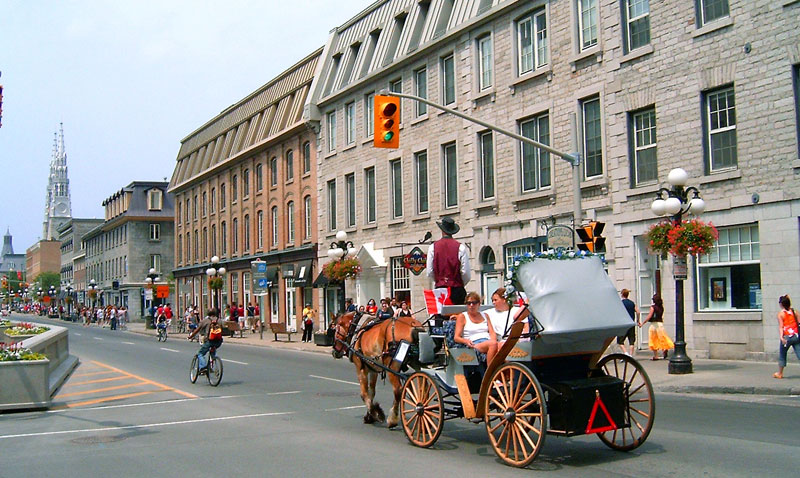
Byward Market is a distinctive area of Ottawa, home to dozens of small boutiques and restaurants.

While the economy is dominated by the federal government, and service industries that support government workers, Ottawa has had several other important industries. Before becoming the capital, Bytown was a centre of the logging industry. The lumber industry remained prominent in Ottawa until the early twentieth century. The lasting legacy in Ottawa are the mansions and buildings constructed by the lumber barons who made up much of the economic elite of early Ottawa. Most notable was John Rudolphus Booth, who commissioned several prominent structures from architect John W.H. Watts. While the lumber and pulp mills disappeared from Ottawa in the early twentieth century, Hull across the river remained an important industrial centre and its waterfront was largely industrialized. Most of those factories have now disappeared, but a few remain. Including the E. B. Eddy Company plant directly across from the Parliament Buildings. Ottawa itself does today have some industrial areas, mostly clustered around the rail lines in the Cyrville and Tanglewood areas south of the core. There is virtually no heavy industry, and most of the industrial buildings are warehouses serving as transshipment points for goods made elsewhere.

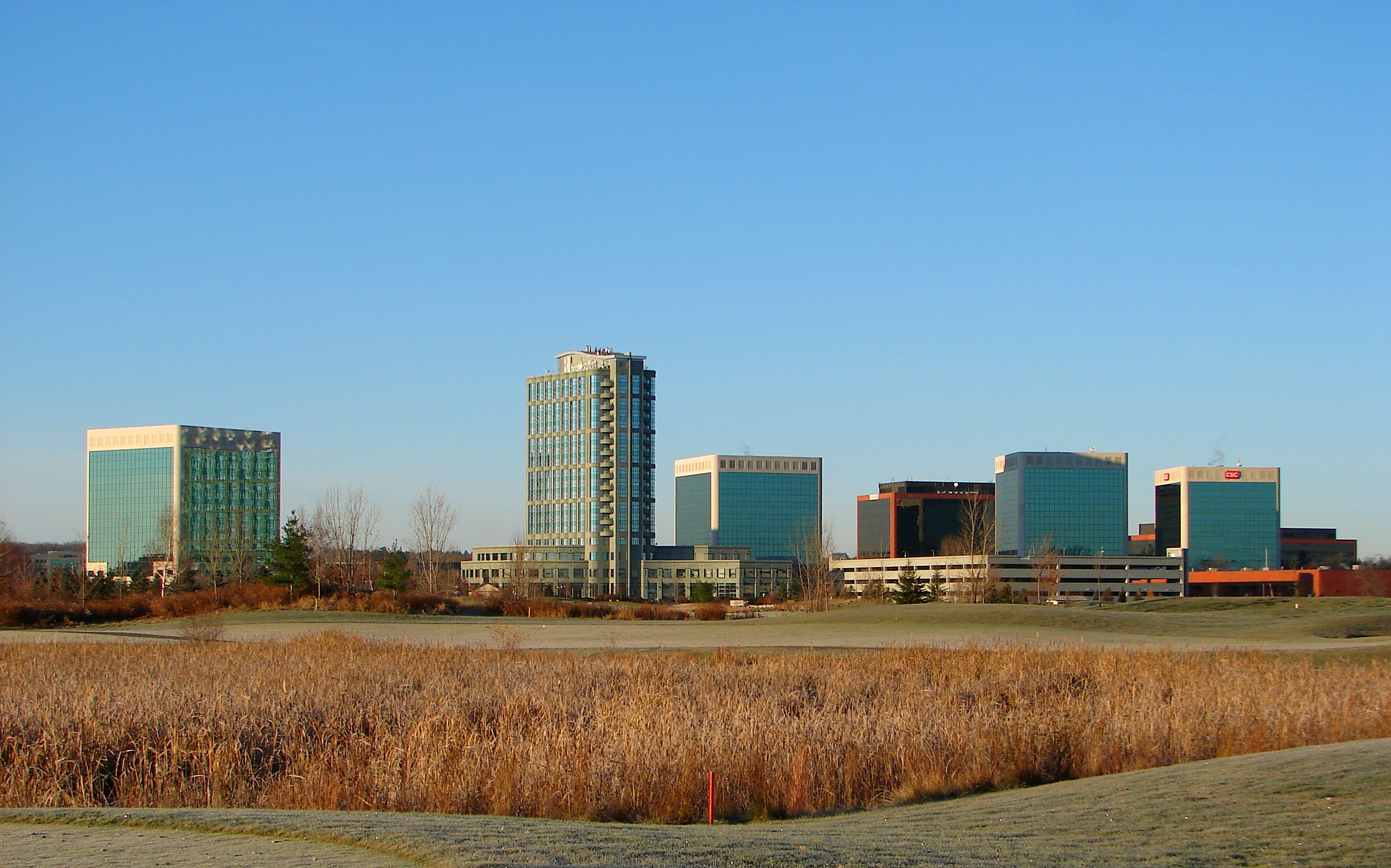
Kanata Research Park with the Marshes Golf Club in the foreground. Ottawa is home to a major high tech sector, most of whom are located in the neighbourhood of Kanata.

In recent years it has been the hi tech sector that has risen to prominence in Ottawa. Especially during the boom years of the 1990s Ottawa was often touted as "Silicon Valley North", home to such firms as Nortel, Corel, JDS Uniphase, and Cognos. This technology sector is almost wholly based in the western part of the city, especially around Kanata. Both Nortel and JDS Uniphase opted to build large compounds on the fringe of the city, while Corel has a series of towers by the Queensway. While the downturn severely hurt this industry, it has recovered in recent years with many smaller firms occupying office space in the west end.

Surviving commercial buildings from early Ottawa can be seen in some parts of downtown, most notably the heritage area along Sussex Drive and the Sparks Street pedestrian mall. These tend to be low stone structures densely clustered together. The vast majority of Ottawa's commercial buildings are similar to those that would be found anywhere in North America. Downtown Ottawa has several commercial streets, the most important being Bank Street the lower levels of many office towers also contain shopping areas. One distinctive area is the Byward Market, home to dozens of small shops and restaurants. The city has several shopping centres, the most central and prominent being the Rideau Centre. The older suburbs each have central shopping malls, such as Billings Bridge Plaza, Bayshore Shopping Centre, Carlingwood Mall. In recent years the newest suburbs have been home to large collections of big-box stores rather than traditional malls, with sprawling such complexes in Kanata, Barrhaven, and South Keys.

== Architects ==
Architects who have played an important role in designing Ottawa structures include:

- George Bemi, Ottawa Public Library Main Branch, St. Basil's Church, [former] Ottawa Congress Centre
- Moses C. Edey, Aberdeen Pavilion, Daly Building
- David Ewart, Royal Canadian Mint, Canadian Museum of Nature, Connaught Building
- Thomas Fuller, original Parliament of Canada Centre Block
- Raymond Moriyama, Ottawa City Hall and the Canadian War Museum
- W.E. Noffke, Central Post Office, Champagne Bath, Ogilvy's
- Moshe Safdie, the National Gallery of Canada and Old City Hall
- Thomas Seaton Scott, Cartier Square Drill Hall, Parliament's West Block
- Francis Conroy Sullivan, a number of buildings inspired by Frank Lloyd Wright
- John W.H. Watts, Booth House, Fleck/Paterson House, Australia House
- Paul Schoeler of Schoeler & Heaton Architects, Public Service Alliance of Canada Building.
- James Strutt, Uplands Air Terminal Ottawa, Canadian Nurses Association Headquarters, LOEB Building for the Social Sciences Carleton University

== Map ==
Below is a map of the National Capital Region showing the prominent buildings and structures. Click on the stars to read articles on the individual buildings.

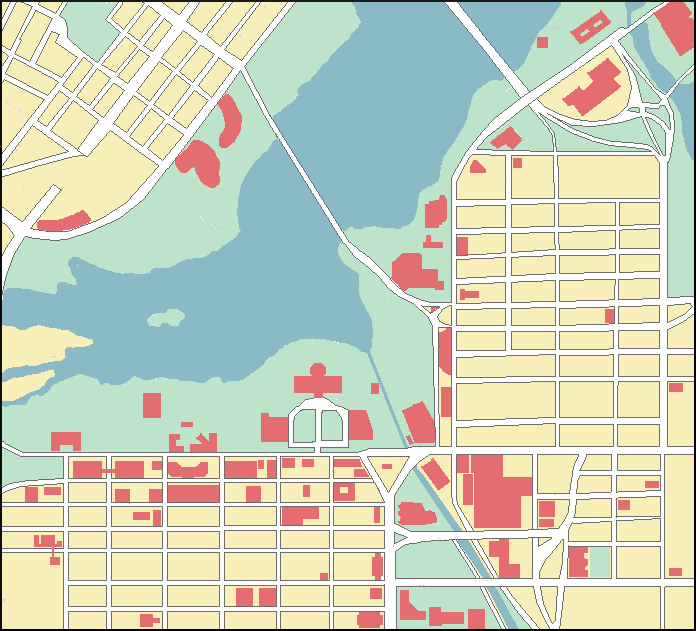

== See also ==
- Architecture of Canada
- List of buildings in Ottawa
- List of tallest buildings in Ottawa-Gatineau
- List of designated heritage properties in Ottawa
- List of National Historic Sites of Canada in Ottawa
