= Centretown United Church =

Coordinates: 45.410254°N 75.692351°W

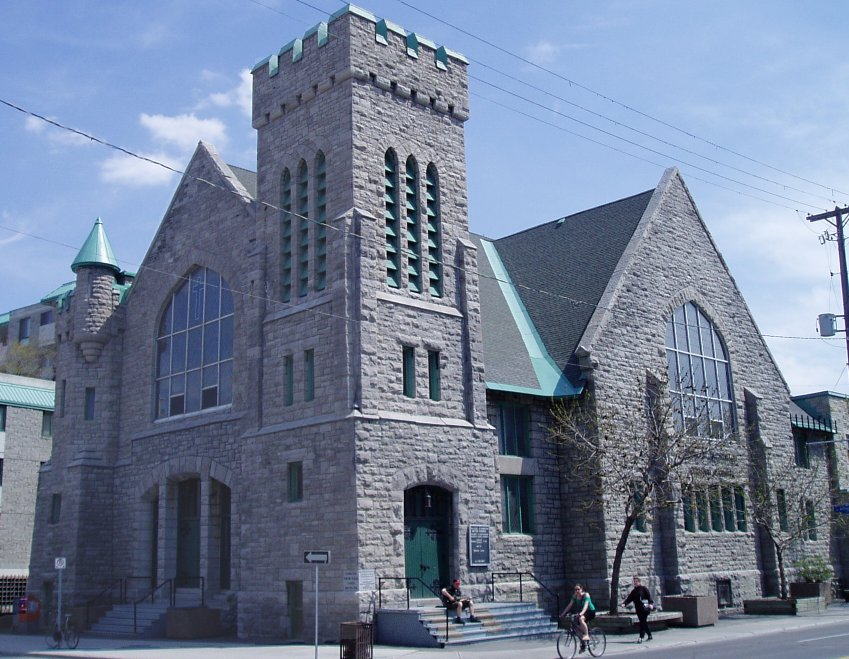
- Centretown United Church
- Centretown United Church
- Location: 507 Bank Street, Ottawa, Ontario
- Country: Canada
- Denomination: United Church of Canada
- Previous denomination: Presbyterian

History
- Former name(s): Stewarton Presbyterian Church; McLeod-Stewarton United Church
- Status: Cathedral

Architecture
- Functional status: Active
- Architect: under the architecture of Moses Chamberlain Edey,
- Architectural type: Norman-Gothic
- Style: Gothic Revival architecture

Centretown United Church is an historic church located in Ottawa, Ontario, Canada at 507 Bank Street at Argyle in the Centretown area. It was built in 1906 as the Stewarton Presbyterian Church using Gothic Revival architecture under the architecture of Moses Chamberlain Edey, (designer of Heritage site the Aberdeen Pavilion and the Daly Building). The corner stone was laid by Sir William Mortimer Clark, Lieutenant Governor of Ontario. Centretown United Church is a member church of the United Church of Canada.

== War memorials ==
A memorial is dedicated to the members of Stewarton Church killed during the First World War. The McLeod Street Church Sunday School erected a brass plaque dedicated to the memory of the members who were killed during the First World War. A bronze plaque on the inside wall of the church was dedicated to the memory of Russell Cleveland Budreo, a member of the 38th Infantry Battalion, Canadian Expeditionary Force, killed in France on 24 March 1918. A brass plaque was dedicated to Signaller Harold Ivan Sawyer, 32nd Battery, Canadian Field Artillery, who was killed during the Battle of the Somme on 23 November 1916. A memorial plaque is dedicated to George Townsend Raynor, a member of the 4th Canadian Mounted Rifles, Canadian Expeditionary Force, killed in action near Ypres, Belgium, on 2 June 1916.

== Recent history ==
The church was created on September 14, 2008 when McLeod-Stewarton United Church merged with Bell Street United. The building had previously been inhabited by McLeod-Stewarton.

McLeod-Stewarton, which was created on November 19, 1961 when McLeod Street Methodist Church amalgamated with Stewarton Presbyterian Church (Stewarton being the original inhabitant). The church's original name is due to the area formerly being called Stewarton, then a village south of Ottawa city limits, on land owned by the family of former Ottawa mayor McLeod Stewart. The building they chose was the Stewarton building, erected in 1906, and whose cornerstone was laid by Sir William Mortimer Clark, Lt. Governor of Ontario.

McLeod Street Methodist Church was built in 1890 and had its cornerstone laid by Prime Minister Sir John A. Macdonald.

During the 1950s the National Sunday Evening Hour broadcast from the church (then Stewarton). In 2004, the congregation voted against continuing amalgamation talks with First United Church with the 58% of votes in favour not meeting the 67% criteria set for continuation. The church is heavily involved with social programs in the community, and abroad. The church often sends a youth delegation abroad on Habitat for Humanity trips. Located on the second floor of the building is Centre 507 which is an outreach centre providing food and clothing for the neighbourhoods homeless population. The position of minister is currently held by the Reverend David Illman-White.

== 2008 amalgamation ==
McLeod-Stewarton amalgamated with Bell Street United Church on September 14, 2008. The churches voted to amalgamate on May 4, 2008.

Church	Yes	%	No	%
McLeod-Stwarton	49	96.1%	2	3.9%
Bell Street	53	86.9%	8	13.1%

On May 25, in a joint service of both churches, the congregations voted on the new name of the amalgamated church, to be now called Centretown United Church.

== List of ministers ==
=== McLeod Street Methodist Church ===
1. C.S. Deeprose (1890–1891)
2. George McRitchie (1891–1894)
3. James Elliot (1894–1898)
4. William Timberlake (1898–1902)
5. Francis Lett (1902–1906)
6. R.L. Richardson (1906–1908)
7. W.J. Hunter (1908–1909)
8. R. Peever (1909–1913)
9. Isaac Gough (1913–1917)
10. George McIntosh (1917–1922)
11. H.A. Frost (1922–1926)
12. C.F. Logan (1926–1932)
13. W.D. Spence (1932–1938)
14. A.E.M. Thomson (1938–1945)
15. William H. Shaves (1945–1950)
16. Arthur D. Waite (1951–1961)

=== Stewarton Presbyterian Church ===
1. R.E. Knowles (1891–98)
2. Robert Herbison (1898–1904)
3. William A. McIlroy (1904–1916)
4. Wesley Megaw (1917–1925)
5. F.S. Milliken (1925–1956)
6. Herbert Reid (1956–1960)

=== McLeod-Stewarton United Church ===
1. Matthew Taylor (1961–1977)
2. Cyril S. Cook (1977–1994)
3. Bill Jay (1994–2003)
4. Grant Dillenbeck (2003–2005)
5. Daniel Hayward (2005–2006)
6. Sam Wigston (2007–2008)

=== Centretown United Church ===
1. Shaun Yaskiw (2008–2009)
2. David Illman-White (2009–2025)
3. Steve Clifton (2025–present)
