= George Bemis =

George Bemis is the name of:

- George Bemis (lawyer) (1816–1878), American lawyer and legal scholar
- George P. Bemis (1838–1916), American developer, politician and women's rights activist

== See also ==
- George E. Bemi (1926–2023), Canadian architect
