= Moses Chamberlain Edey =

Canadian architect

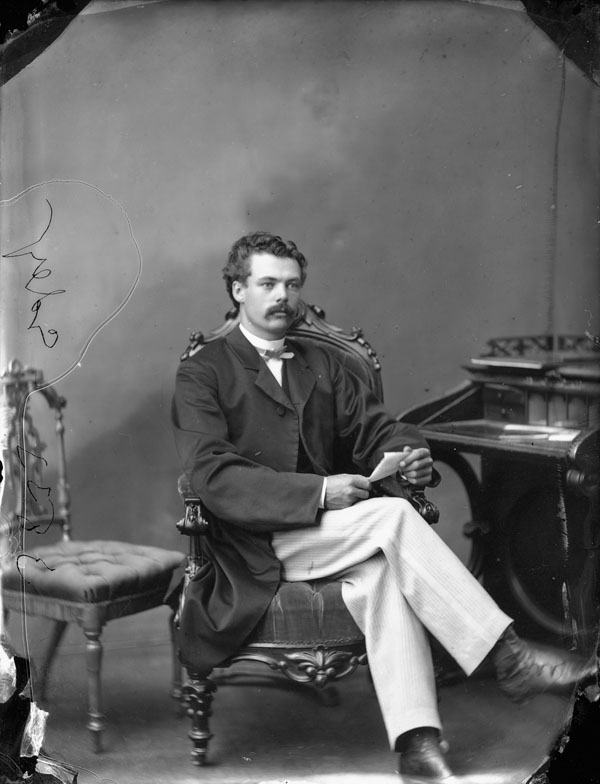
- Moses Edey in 1869
- Born: 1845 near Shawville, Canada East.
- Died: February 1, 1919 (aged 73–74)
- Education: Ottawa School of Art
- Occupation: Architect
- Buildings: Aberdeen Pavilion; Daly Building; Centretown United Church; Garland Building

Moses Chamberlain Edey (1845–1919) was an Ottawa architect who designed the Aberdeen Pavilion at Lansdowne Park, a National Historic Site and the Daly Building (1905–1992), which was Ottawa's first department store.

His architectural styles were Gothic, Romanesque, and Beaux Arts, with the Daly Building a Chicago style. Edey had worked with Ottawa architect W.E. Noffke and Ottawa architect Francis Conroy Sullivan had once worked as a draftsman for Edey.

== History ==
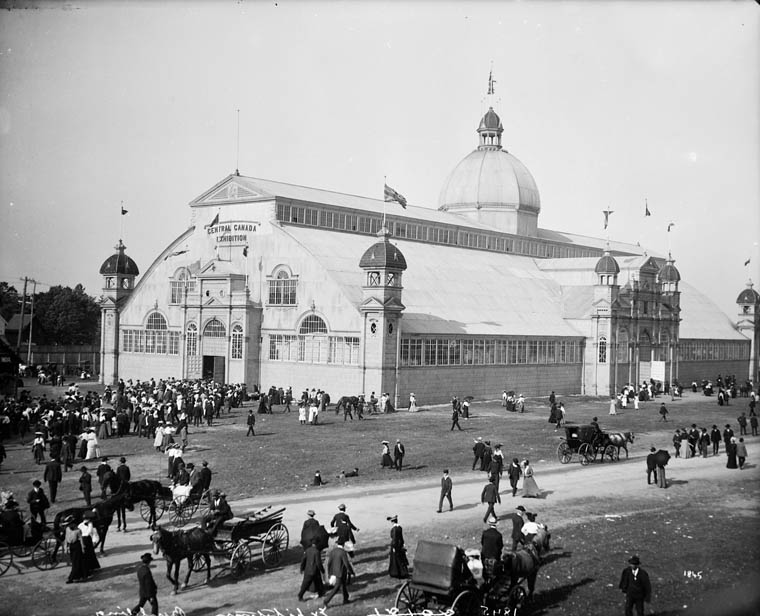
The Aberdeen Pavilion, Lansdowne Park, Ottawa in 1903

Moses Edey was born 1845 in the southwestern area of Quebec, Pontiac County near Shawville. He was the second son of six children of Richard and Mary Edey, descendants of United Empire Loyalists. The Edeys were part of the second wave of settlers to the Ottawa Valley, after Philemon Wright arrived in 1800 (the founder of Hull, Quebec). Moses Edey came to Hull, Quebec from Randolph, Vermont, in 1805. Moses' father, Richard had been born in 1812 in Aylmer, Quebec. Moses designed the red-brick Methodist chapel that still stands on Vanier Road, Aylmer. Artifacts from the Mayflower still exist, the possessions of the family of Moses' mother, whose ancestors journeyed on that famous ship.

Following some time with the Casey Tool Company of Auburn, New York, he later worked for 10 years in design and construction in Ottawa under an A. Sparks. Thereafter, he concentrated on architecture.

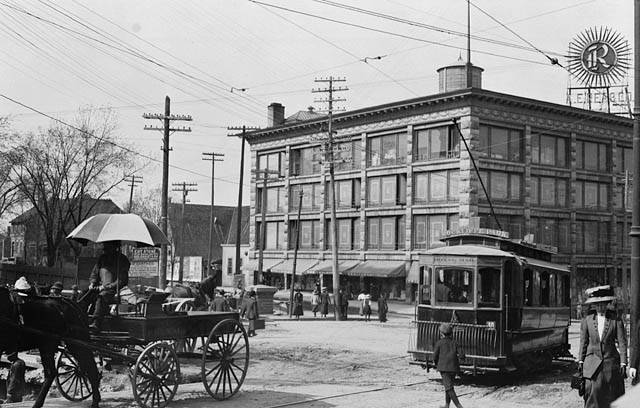
Daly Building ca. 1912, Rideau Street with tram streetcar. This building was demolished in 1991-1992 accompanied by a huge amount of publicity, controversy and criticism.

By the 1860s Moses Edey had completed apprenticeships in architecture and building construction, as well as in carriage design and construction. He had moved to Arnprior at 17, where he worked in carriage making for two years, and two more in Ottawa in that trade. He then studied under Thomas in Toronto and went to Moravia, New York and studied under Z. D. Stearns

During this time, he spent five years at the Ottawa School of Arts and held diplomas from the Ontario School of Art. He joined the Ontario Society of Architects. After studying design at the Ottawa Art School, he set up shop on Sparks Street

Moses Edey married Mary Whillans from Russell, Ontario and had two children, Mabel Gertrude Mary Edey, and Isabel Maude Edey.

Edey had building plans for Lansdowne Park, a fairground in Ottawa, with the centrepiece the Aberdeen Pavilion, which came to be known affectionately as the "Cattle Castle". The building survived despite sustained calls for demolition, and was rehabilitated.

== Work ==
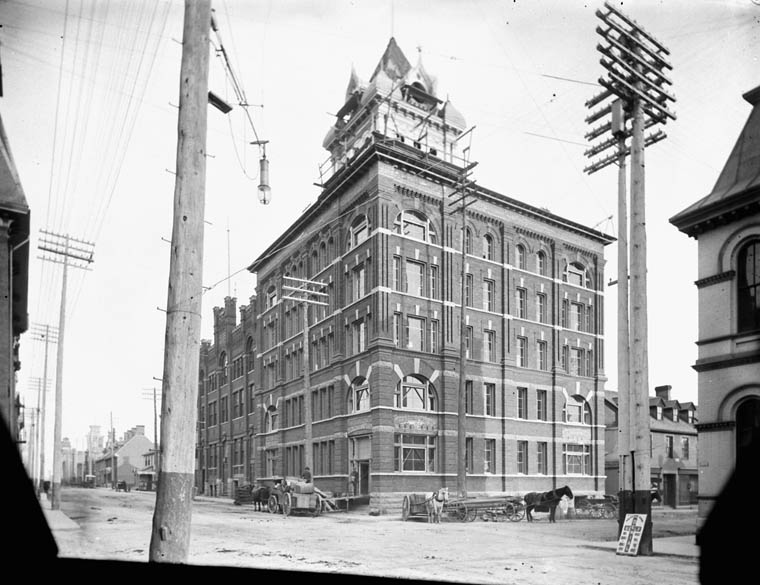
Garland Building, southeast corner of Queen Street & O'Connor Street, Downtown Ottawa, Ontario, November 1898. This building was later demolished.

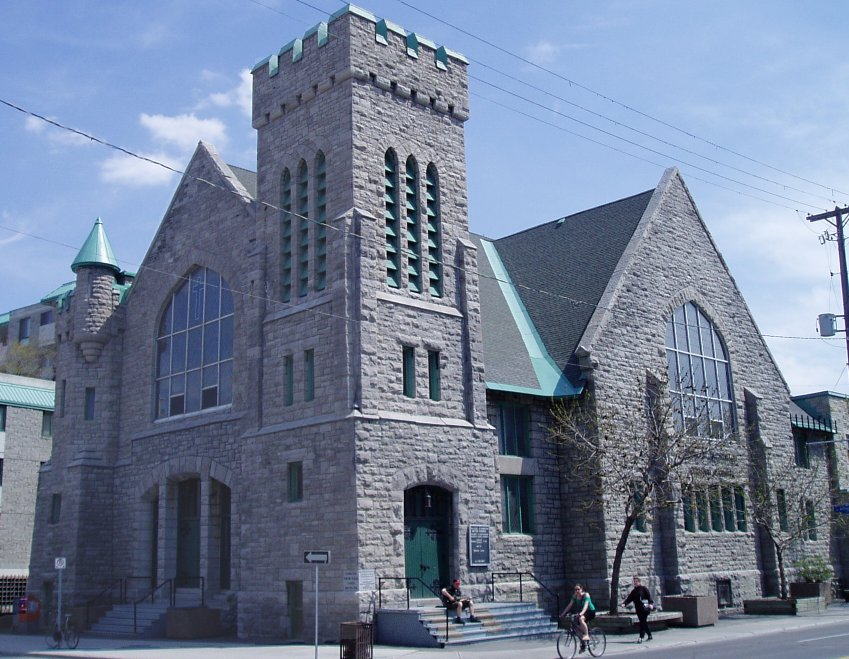
Centretown United Church

- Aberdeen Pavilion at Lansdowne Park for (a.k.a. the "Cattle Castle" for the Central Canada Exhibition), which is a National Historic Site
- Daly Building (1905-1992) which was Ottawa's first department store.
- Centretown United Church
- Mountain View Chapel, chemin Vanier, Aylmer, Qc
- Garland Building (demolished)

He also possibly designed:

- The Geggie Home at 801, Chemin Riverside, Wakefield, Quebec
- Mount Pleasant (apparently gone), a home at 40 Riverdale Avenue (City of Ottawa has an archive picture probably CA-2954)

== See also ==
- Architecture of Ottawa and the Architecture of Ottawa#Architects section
- Aberdeen Pavilion
- Daly Building
- Centretown United Church
