= Bemi =

Bemi or BEMI may refer to:

- George E. Bemi (1926–2023), Canadian architect
- Bemi, a name in the Guidonian hand, a mnemonic device for singers
- Buchla Electronic Musical Instruments, a defunct manufacturer of synthesizers and unique MIDI controllers
