= Dunton Tower =

Educational Tower in Ottawa

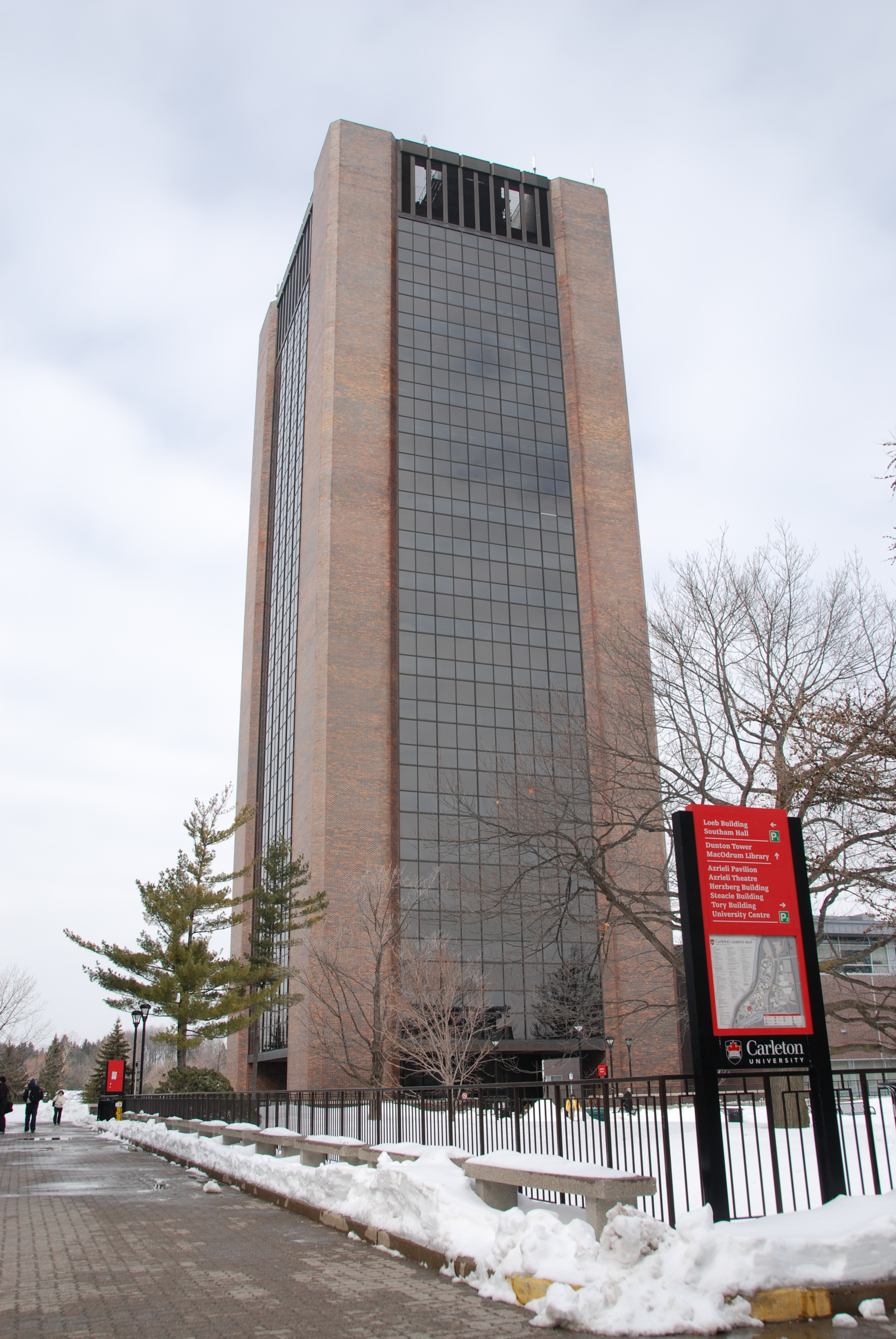
- Interactive map of the Dunton Tower area

General information
- Location: Ottawa, Canada
- Coordinates: 45.38267°N 75.69933°W
- Completed: early 1970s (Note: Completion date is unclear. Various sources say 1972, 1970, and 1974.)

Height
- Height: 77m

Technical details
- Floor count: 22

Design and construction
- Architects: Murray and Murray

Dunton Tower is the tallest building on the Carleton University campus and one of the tallest in Ottawa. The tower is currently used as an education facility with classrooms and study areas. The buildings surrounding the tower are MacOdrum Library, Paterson Hall, Tory Building, and the Azrieli Pavilion.

== History ==
Dunton Tower was completed in the early 1970s, and named after former president of Carleton University, A. Davidson Dunton. The tower was formerly known as the Arts Tower. In 2017, the tower was recommended to be placed on Ottawa's heritage registry.

== Institutions Housed ==
Dunton Tower houses many of Carleton University's institutions:

- School of Social Work
- School of Indigenous and Canadian Studies
- Institute of Cognitive Science
- Institute of Interdisciplinary Studies
- Feminist Institute of Social Transformation
- Institute of Criminology and Criminal Justice
- The departments of English and French

== Notability ==
The tower is currently the 58th tallest educational building in the world. It has served as a dominating landmark in Ottawa and serves as one of the main landmarks of Carleton University due to its distinctive appearance.

== Criticism ==
At the time of construction and completion the tower was controversial, with some critics arguing it was inappropriate for a university campus and would negatively impact views of the Rideau Canal.

The tower is often criticised by students; some complain about elevators not working, others complain about the design, and other criticisms of the building.
