= Lansdowne Park =

Exhibition grounds in Ottawa

Coordinates: 45.399°N 75.683°W

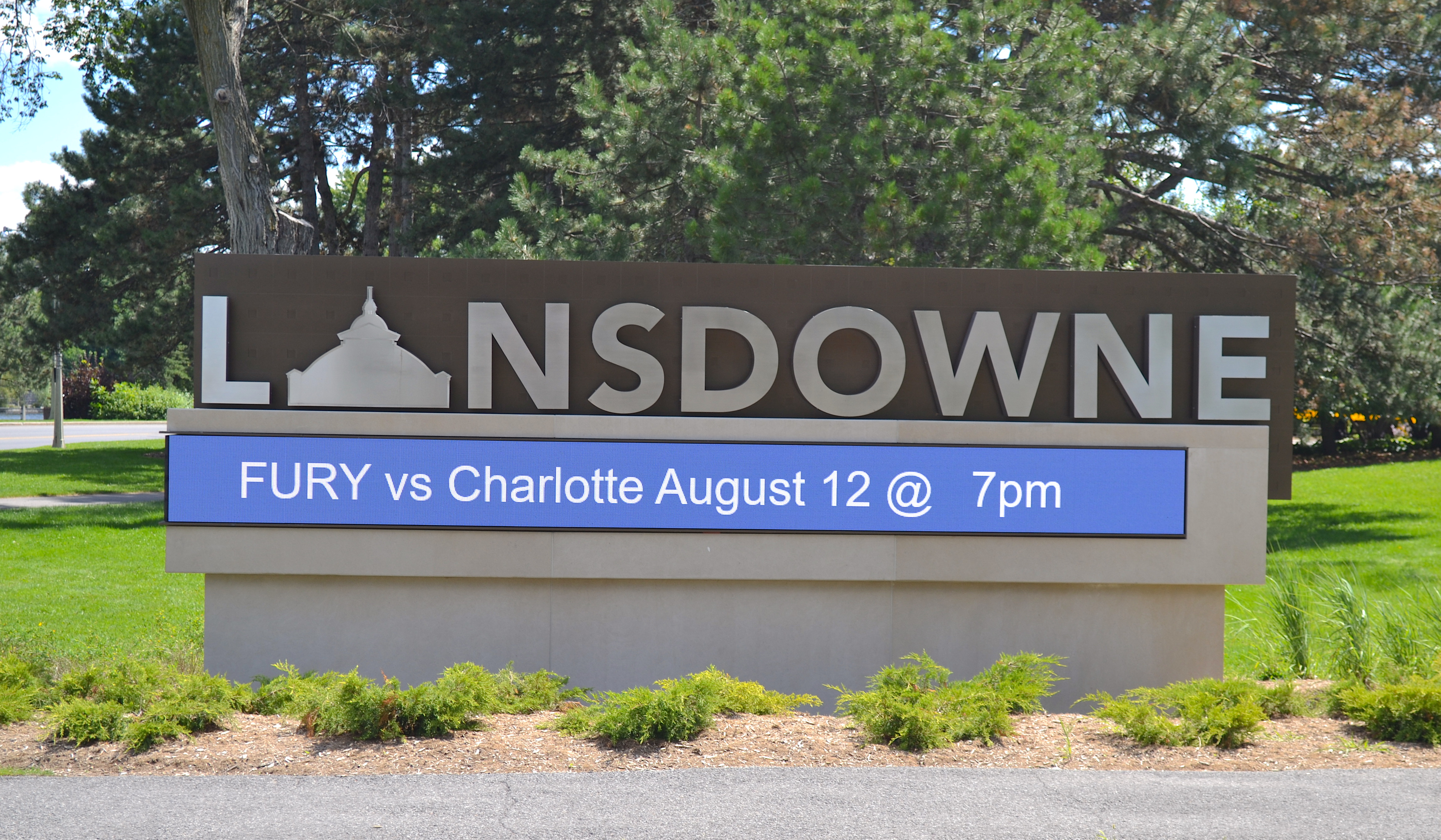
- Interactive map of Lansdowne Park
- Type: Urban Park
- Location: 1015 Bank Street, Ottawa, Ontario
- Area: 40 acres (16 ha)
- Created: 1868
- Operator: City of Ottawa

Lansdowne Park is a 40-acre (16 ha) urban park, historic sports, exhibition and entertainment facility in Ottawa, Ontario, Canada, owned by the City of Ottawa. It is located on Bank Street adjacent to the Rideau Canal in The Glebe neighbourhood of central Ottawa. Lansdowne Park contains the TD Place Stadium and Arena complex (formerly Frank Clair Stadium and the Ottawa Civic Centre, respectively), the Aberdeen Pavilion, and the Horticulture Building.

In 2012, the park began a major redevelopment. The stadium complex was partially rebuilt and major retail, commercial and residential developments were added to the site. Along the Rideau Canal, the open space which used to be parking was converted into an urban park with green space and recreation facilities. Parking for the site was relocated underground. Basketball courts, a skate park, and water features were also constructed. Since 2020, further redevelopment has been proposed and planned.

== History ==
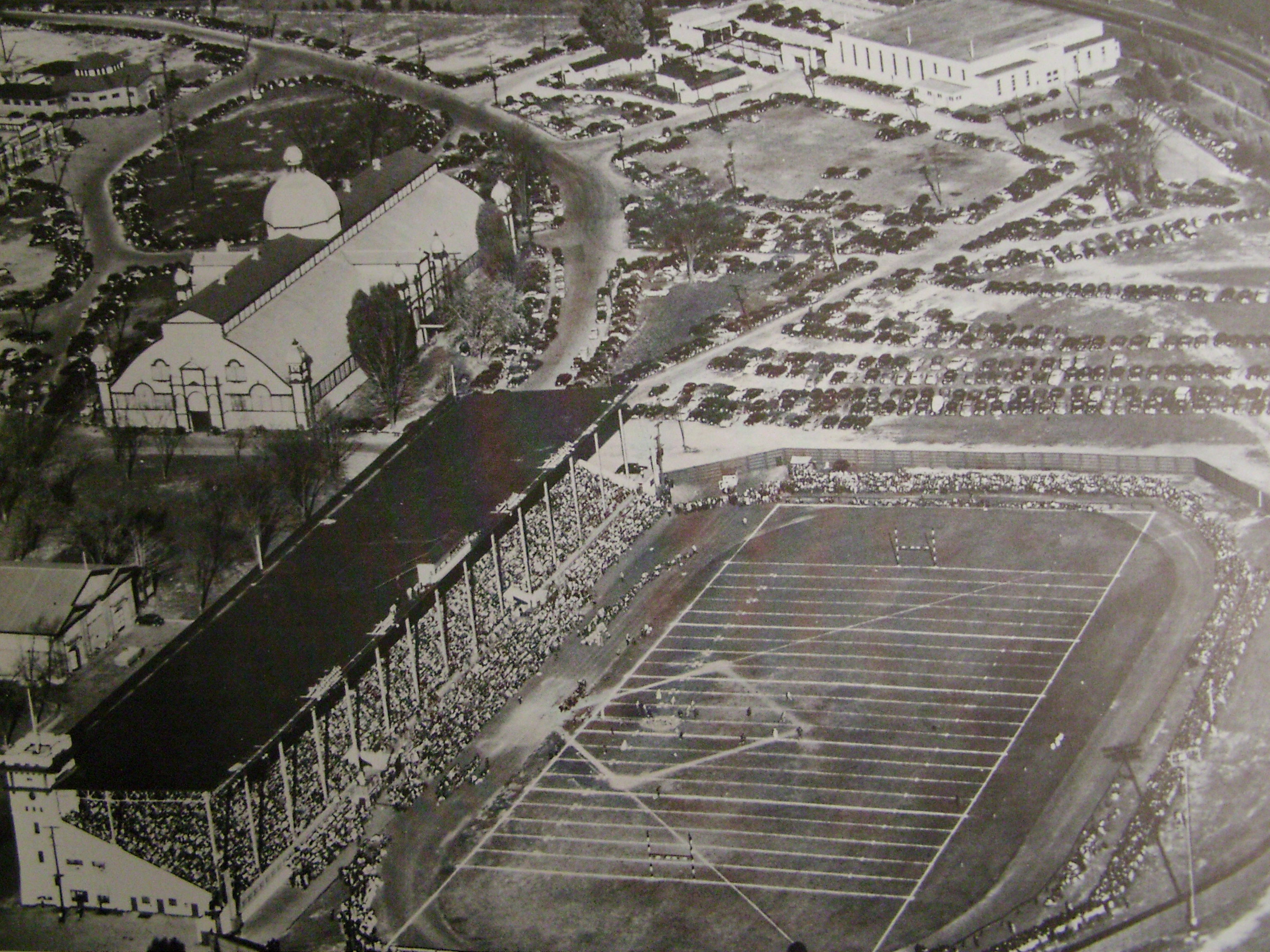
Lansdowne Park, 1950

In 1847, the then Bytown was deeded 24.5 acres (9.9 ha) acres by the government of the Province of Canada, and acquired another 15 acres (6.1 ha) bought from owners over several years, to make up the initial grounds of what is now called Lansdowne Park. Two notable exhibitions occurred prior to the first Central Canada Exhibition. In 1875, the City of Ottawa hosted the thirtieth annual Exhibition of the Provincial Agricultural and Arts Association. In 1877 an exhibition included the first public demonstration of the telephone in Canada.

A third provincial exhibition was held at Lansdowne in 1879. In order to provide sufficient space for subsequent fairs, the City acquired more of Lansdowne and the buildings that were there in 1883 for $25,000. The Central Canada Exhibition Association was formed in 1888 and the site witnessed many improvements, including the erection of a new Horticultural Hall and Grandstand. The first Central Canada Exhibition opened on 20 September 1888 and was held annually until 2010. In 1890 the park was named for the 5th Marquess of Lansdowne, who served as Governor General of Canada from 1883 to 1888.

The Aberdeen Pavilion has figured prominently in military matters: troops of Lord Strathcona's Horse were encamped there during the Boer War; the Princess Patricia's Canadian Light Infantry mustered there before being sent to France in the First World War; and during World War II it served as an induction centre for thousands of Canadian troops heading overseas and was the home to The Cameron Highlanders of Ottawa (4th Princess Louise Dragoon Guards).

In 1947, the Marian Congress was held at Lansdowne Park from June 18 to 22, 1947, hosted by the Roman Catholic Archdiocese of Ottawa. Estimates of attendance vary from 100,000 to 250,000. A huge outdoor site was built for the religious spectacular. In front were benches enough to seat 75,000 people. There were also 110 exhibits on the site. Msgr. John O'Neill, assistant pastor at St George's Church was the prime organizer of the Congress. Its purpose was to celebrate the centenary of the Archdiocese of Ottawa and to pray for lasting peace in the world. Although now largely forgotten, in its day it was the largest religious conference in North America, with thousands of visitors coming from all parts of North America to witness this week of prayer. Many were locals but visitors arrived by car, bus, plane, and 66 special excursion trains. During the five-day Congress there was a procession of floats along the canal driveway. The Congress also featured the Dionne Quintuplets (age 13) singing hymns in both English and French. The event ended with an event called "the greatest fireworks display ever held in Canada" depicting scenes in the life of the Blessed Virgin. A message to the Congress from Pope Pius XII was broadcast during a Mass on June 19 and carried by major radio networks across the country.

In April 1952, the fairground at the park was selected in an exercise by the federal civil defence organization as an assembly point where the survivors of a nuclear attack on Ottawa gathered to receive food and water.

The City of Ottawa periodically reviews the use and state of the facility. Lansdowne was developed as a municipal fairgrounds, and somewhat rural in nature. Over time, permanent buildings were built on the site, and a majority of the site was paved, both for parking and for exhibition use. As the result of a review in the 1990s, the city demolished some of the buildings, and restored the parkland. The city restored the Aberdeen Pavilion at the time, using funds planned for a Central Canada Ex move, in exchange for allowing the Ex to continue to use the site.

Lansdowne Park has long been the primary sports facility in Ottawa. The sports venues located on the site have played host to championships in curling, figure skating, Canadian football, ice hockey and association football. The Aberdeen Pavilion hosted Stanley Cup championship games in 1904 played by the Ottawa Silver Seven. The Civic Centre has hosted the Canadian Men's curling championship, Canadian and World championships in figure skating and the Memorial Cup Canadian junior-age ice hockey championships.

In particular, Frank Clair Stadium and its outdoor field has a long history of sports usage in baseball, football, lacrosse and soccer (including Olympic soccer). The stadium has held Grey Cup football, and World Cup Under 20 soccer championships. Before the south stands were built, the field was a combination baseball, outdoor lacrosse and football facility. The Ottawa Giants and Ottawa Athletics professional baseball teams used the facility from 1951 to 1954. The Ottawa Lacrosse Club and the Ottawa Capitals lacrosse clubs used the field from before 1900 for field lacrosse. Prior to the redevelopment, the CFL professional football franchises Ottawa Rough Riders and Ottawa Renegades used the field until 2005.

Currently, the stadium is home to the CFL franchise Ottawa RedBlacks and Canadian Premier League soccer team Atletico Ottawa. Major annual events in the stadium include the Panda Game with rival university football teams from Carleton University and University of Ottawa, and the Escapade Music Festival.

Lansdowne Speedway, a 0.25 miles (0.40 km) dirt track, existed at the field, and was used initially for horse racing. In 1955, it was converted to host stock car racing. The track was extended to 0.33 miles (0.53 km), banked and paved in 1957. Successful financially, the stock cars were evicted from the site after lobbying by local residents. Race promoter Gerry Bisson then built a race track west of Ottawa in Stittsville, Ontario (now part of Ottawa) which is today known as Capital City Speedway.

The Horticulture Building, built in 1914, was designed for winter use as a curling rink with seasonal exhibition uses. Other buildings including the General Purpose Building and the McElroy Building, both since demolished, also had sheets of ice installed for curling.

== Exhibition and entertainment usage ==
The site hosted the annual Central Canada Exhibition, also known as the 'Ottawa Super Ex' from 1888 until 2010. The Exhibition used the full site, offering agricultural and cultural exhibits, midway rides and various entertainments for 10 days every year in August. The Central Canada Exhibition Association (CCEA) was the primary manager of Lansdowne Park for the city until turning over operation of the park to the city on May 1, 1973. The Central Canada Exhibition completed its last season at Lansdowne Park in August 2010.

The Arena at TD Place and Coliseum (now demolished) buildings are used regularly for other exhibitions such as home shows, industrial exhibitions and conventions, including political conventions. Since 1967, when the Ottawa Auditorium was demolished, Lansdowne Park has become a site of musical concerts, both inside the Arena at TD Place and outside on the Stadium field. Although the Canadian Tire Centre arena was built in 1996 and hosts the largest indoor concerts in Ottawa, the Arena at TD Place continues to host musical concerts.

== Redevelopment ==
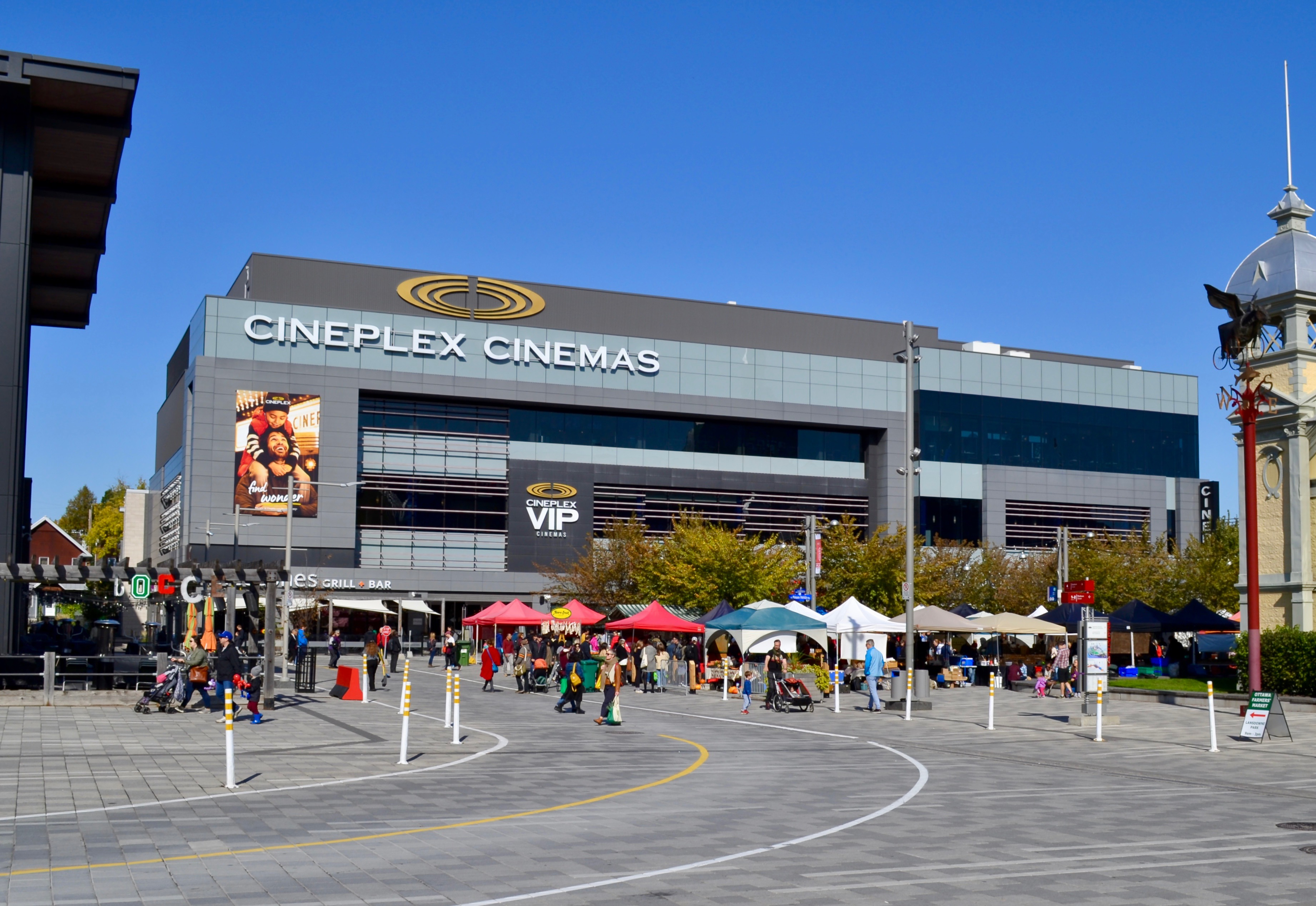
The Lansdowne Farmer's Market, mid-October 2019

In September 2007, cracks were found in Frank Clair Stadium, necessitating the demolition of a portion of its south-side stands. The City of Ottawa subsequently started a review to redevelop Lansdowne Park. A group of Ottawa businessmen, known as the Ottawa Sports and Entertainment Group (OSEG), were awarded a new Canadian Football League franchise (now the Ottawa Redblacks) in March 2008, contingent on securing a stadium in which to play. OSEG proposed a public-private partnership with the city to rebuild the stadium and redevelop the grounds with residential and commercial uses to finance the reconstruction and annual upkeep of the site. Ottawa City Council decided to enter into a partnership with the OSEG group and abandoned its own review.

The redevelopment plan split into two components after the City rejected the portion of the OSEG proposal regarding the lands bordering the Rideau Canal. OSEG was assigned the precinct around the stadium and along Bank Street, while a design competition was held for an urban park to be located along the canal. The OSEG plan envisioned two towers along Bank Street, a new set of grandstands at the football stadium and a new residential and commercial precinct to the north of the stadium. The new greenspace along the Rideau Canal frontage is intended as a new front lawn for Lansdowne. The estimated cost to the city for the stadium renovation and its share of the parking development was $129.3 million. OSEG's funding of the commercial redevelopment and its share of the parking was $118 million. The urban park is estimated to cost $35 million and $8.5 million has been spent for a new trade show and exhibition hall built near Ottawa airport, to replace the existing space at Lansdowne. The total estimated cost was $290.8 million, $172.8 million coming from the city. The city retains ownership of the site, leasing the commercial and retail component to pay off the debt under a revenue-sharing formula with OSEG.

The redevelopment plan was opposed by some Ottawa residents, particularly those near the Lansdowne site. Heritage activists objected to a plan to move a heritage building on the site. An organization called the Lansdowne Park Conservancy made an unsolicited stadium and park bid for Lansdowne that was rejected by the City of Ottawa. The $98 million proposal included retaining the existing buildings and a renovated stadium. Under the LPC plan, the city would fund the entire redevelopment cost to be repaid through site revenues. Other opponents opposed the redevelopment plan at the Ontario Municipal Board, who moved forward with the redevelopment plan after they agreed to height restrictions and rejected other appeals. A court challenge brought by the Friends of Lansdowne group was heard at Ontario Superior Court, arguing that the project was illegal and the city acted in bad faith. In a verdict delivered on July 28, 2011, the court rejected all of the group's arguments. Both the Conservancy and Friends groups filed appeals. The Conservancy appeal was dismissed without merit as an "abuse of process," and awarded a legal judgment of $10,000 costs against. The Friends appeal was dismissed in April 2012 in a unanimous decision by the court. It dismissed all points raised by the Friends' appeal but did not award costs to the City.

The first phase of redevelopment was completed in 2014 with the construction of the 47000 square metre underground parking garage, retail stores, a commercial and two condominium towers, and the relocation of the Horticulture Building, a project which the consulting engineers touted as "a successful sports and entertainment destination".

== Lansdowne 2.0 and Debate ==
In December 2020, Ottawa City Council directed city employees and OSEG to consider options to "enhance the sustainability and long-term viability" of Lansdowne Park. In July 2021, Council agreed to move forward with the recommendations of a staff report. Since then, the city has been developing and promoting the Lansdowne 2.0 plan. The plan has faced many criticisms including:

- average losses of about $11 million per year since the initial renovations were completed in 2014, yet the Lansdowne 2.0 design includes 40% fewer seats in the arena, 20% fewer seats in the north stands, and 2% more retail/commercial space, making it questionable that the redeveloped site could be any more profitable despite its $500 million cost
- demolishing the current stadium when it is still viable, at a cost of $419 million or more when maintaining the existing stadium would cost $3.8 million per year and extend its life up to 40 more years
- demolition of new retail space that was only built in 2014 during the previous redevelopment
- the new 5,500-seat event centre "is a bet against women’s sport in Ottawa" and would be too small to host events such as the Ottawa Charge hockey games, which regularly attract more than 8,000 fans
- no affordable housing is proposed in the new towers
- there is no roof on the new, smaller north side stands, so there is no shelter from the weather
- a "pinch point" in the design which cause pedestrian-vehicle conflicts and accessibility issues

The city Office of the Auditor General noted that construction cost estimates were optimistic and identified risks in specific revenue and expense projections which could affect partners' ability to repay debts to the city. The auditor also noted that the City is responsible for the cost of construction and any cost overruns, but the significant revenue from the project (waterfall distributions to partners) is only expected to occur in the later years of the Partnership Agreement, increasing risk and uncertainty.

Shawn Menard, Ottawa city councillor for Capital Ward accused the city of using "scare tactics" to justify the redevelopment since city staff and engineering reports confirm the current buildings are safe, with decades of life left in them. Menard has presented a petition of over 5000 signatures asking for a referendum on the project, but the mayor says there is "no need" and the city plans to tender for construction on June 16, 2025.

== Gallery ==
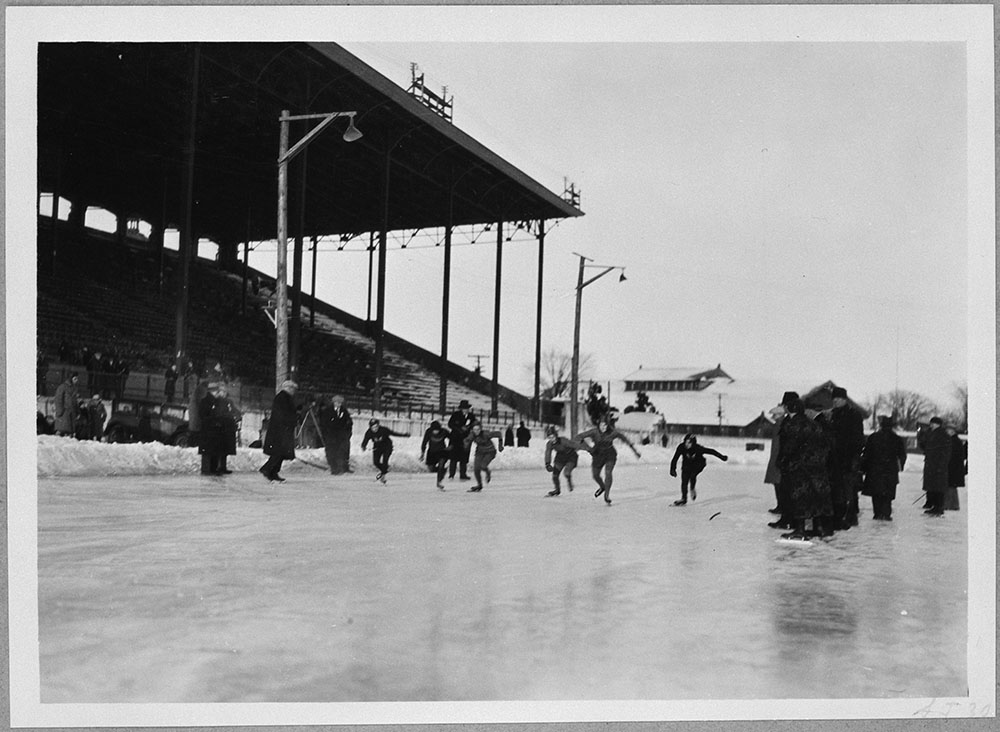
Beginning of the girls' speed-skating race on the sports field at Landowne Park, 1930

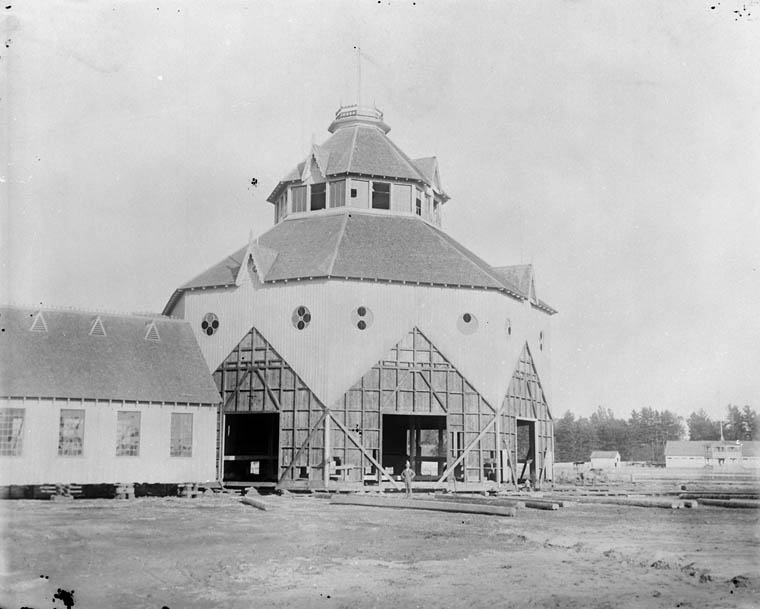
Exhibition Building at Lansdowne Park, early 20th century (Topley, William James, 1845-1930)

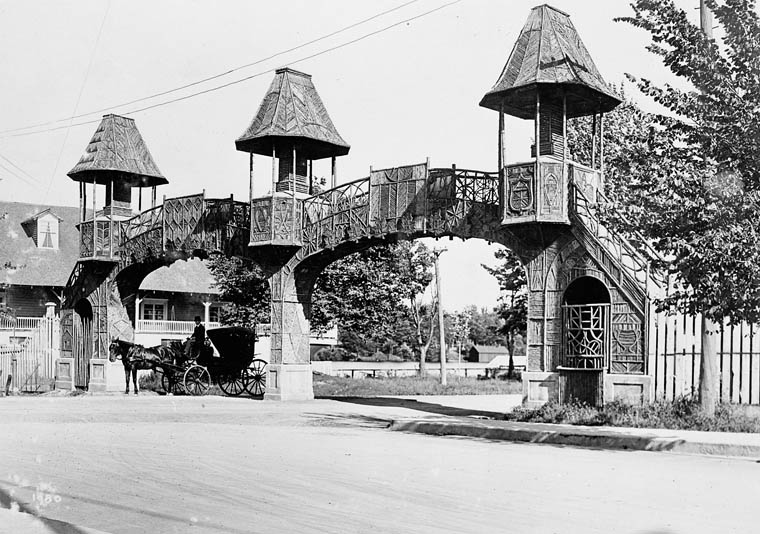
Lansdowne Park entrance arches, early 20th century (Topley, William James, 1845-1930)

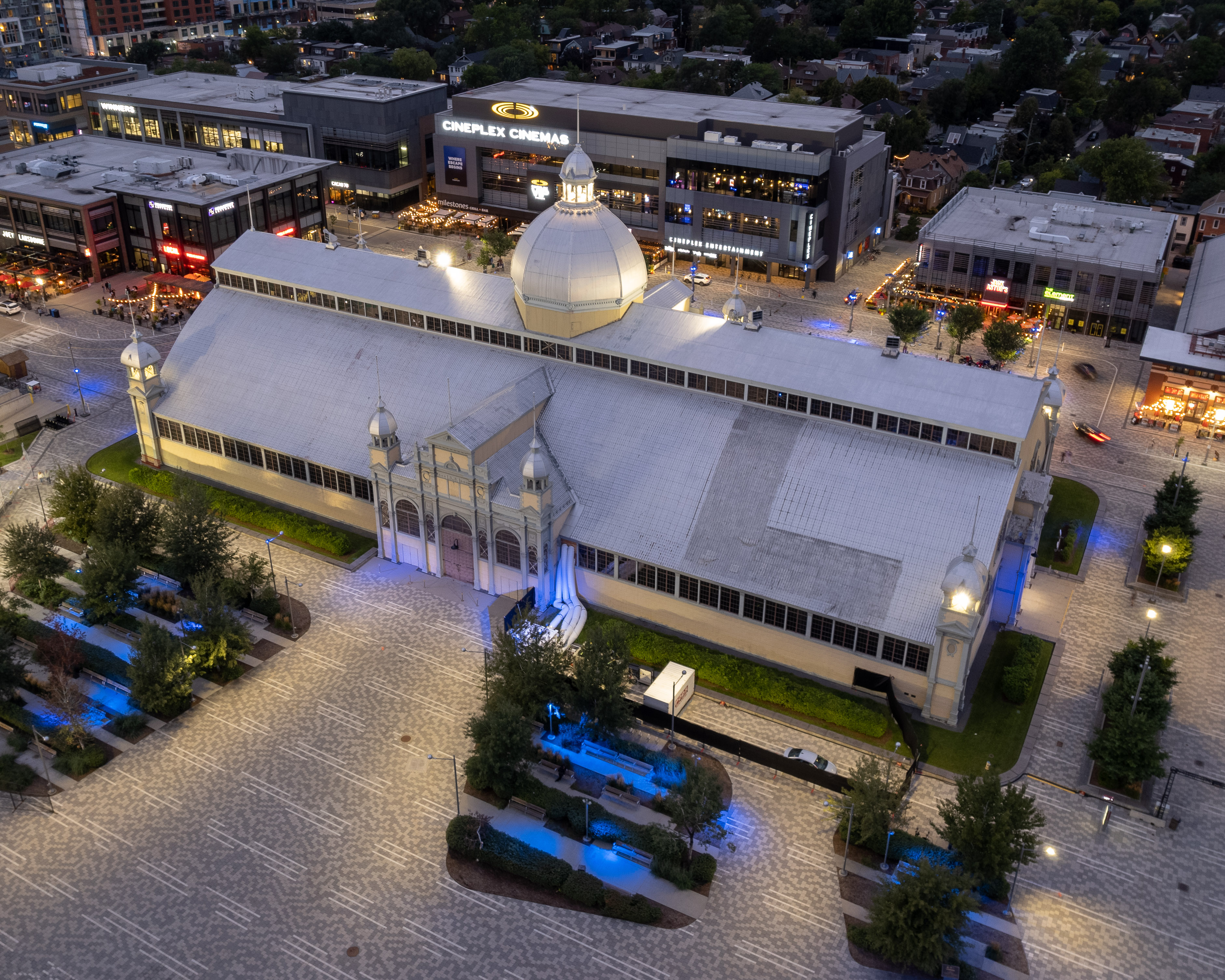
The Aberdeen Pavilion in 2021

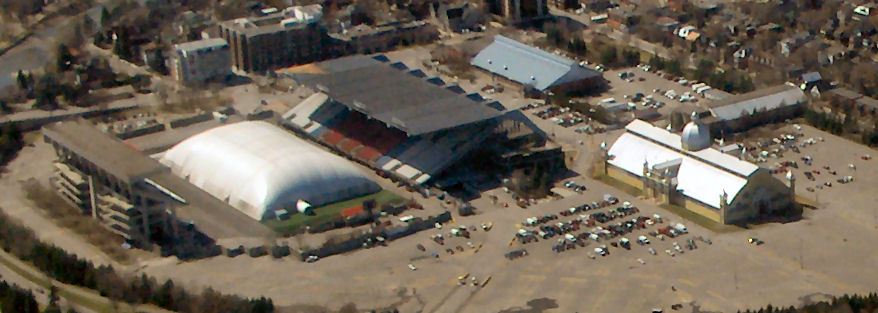
Lansdowne Park, as seen from the air before redevelopment. The field was covered to allow for use during the winter months

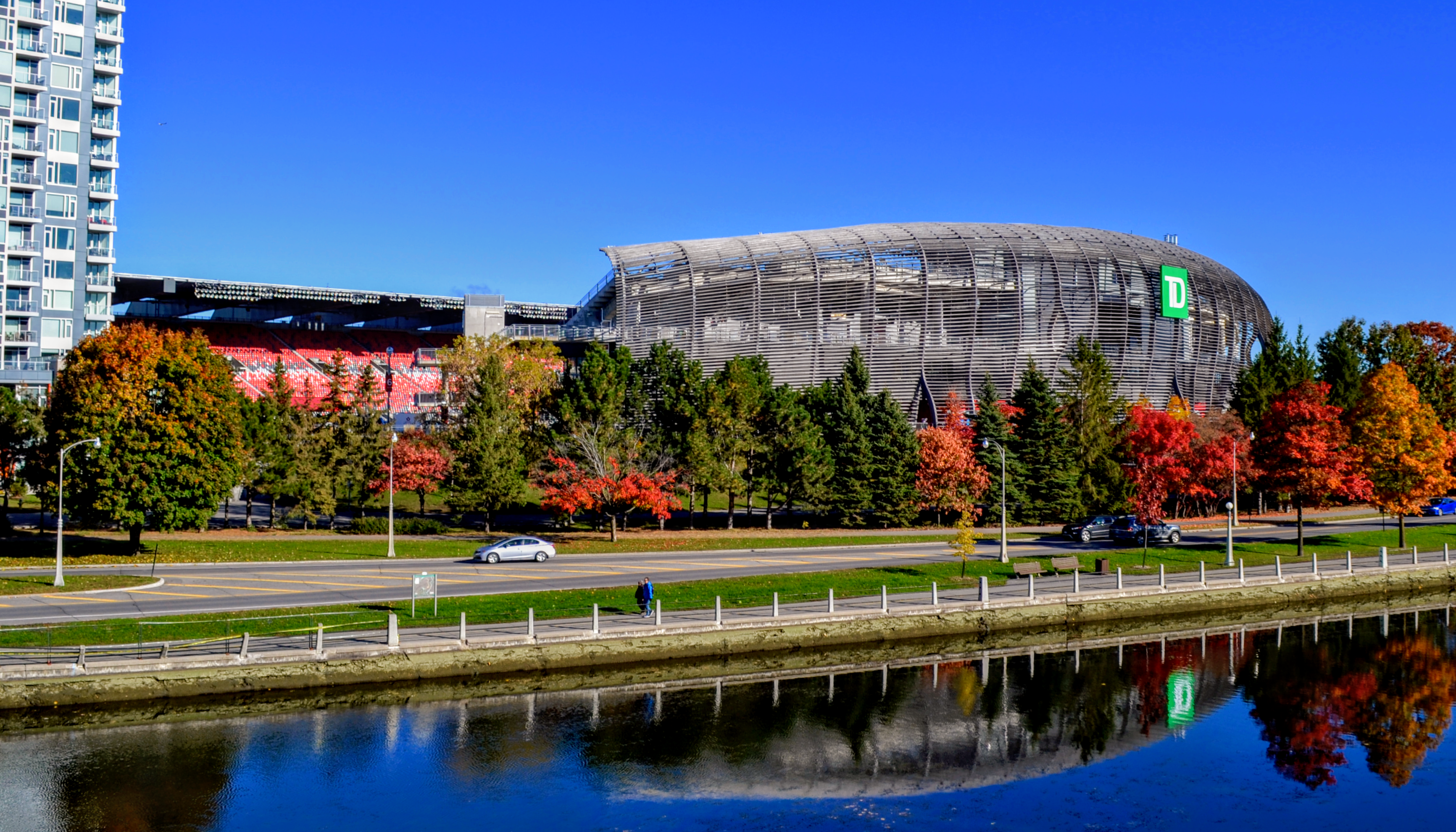
TD Place and Lansdowne Park, mid-October 2019
