= Daly Building =

Historic building in Ottawa, Canada

Coordinates: 45.425828°N 75.694057°W

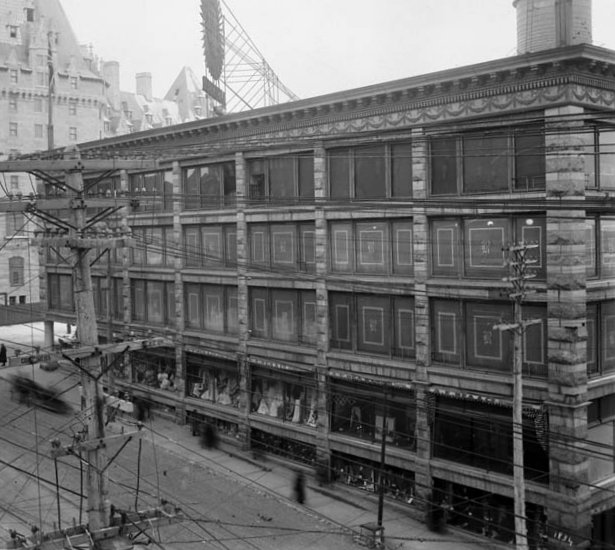
An early image of the Daly Building.

The Daly Building was a historic department store and office building in Ottawa, Ontario, Canada, that was demolished with much controversy in 1991–92.

== History ==
=== 20th century ===
The building, designed by Moses Chamberlain Edey, opened as the T. Lindsay department store on June 21, 1905 and was Ottawa's first department store. It was located at the prominent intersection of Rideau Street and Sussex Drive. The building was the only Chicago Style structure built in Ottawa, and one of the few such buildings erected in Canada. Later owned by A.E. Rae & Co, it was expanded at the north end and two additional stories were added in 1913. H.J. Daly acquired the building in 1915.

The Daly Building became a government office building in 1921 and served this role for many decades. Owned by the National Capital Commission (NCC), they had the cornice removed in 1964 after stone fell from it killing a pedestrian on the street below. The building was left unrenovated. In 1978 it was abandoned as unsuitable for office work. During the 1980s, the NCC tried to find a company that would restore the building, and in 1987 a Montreal firm was given a $45 million contract to restore the structure. However, when the building was examined it was found that portions were structurally unsound, and if it were to be restored large sections would have to be wholly rebuilt. Further studies found that if left alone the building posed a danger to the public, and could collapse under winter snow.

The developers did not have the funds to do such an extensive project, and in a controversial decision the NCC chose not to look for a new partner and in September 1991 authorized the destruction of the building. This was the first designated heritage building destroyed in the city since the heritage guidelines were introduced in 1982. It was a hugely controversial decision in Ottawa, that drew much criticism of the NCC both for the years of neglect that let the building decline and for the final decision to demolish it. It was demolished piecemeal circa October 1991-March 1992.

=== 21st century ===
The Daly Building site remained vacant for more than a decade. There was much discussion of what would be built there; some advocated a park, and for a time there was a scheme to build a national aquarium on the site. Eventually, the NCC leased the site to a developer who erected an 11-storey luxury apartment building, which opened in 2004.
