= Aberdeen Pavilion =

Exhibition hall in Ottawa

- Pavillon Aberdeen
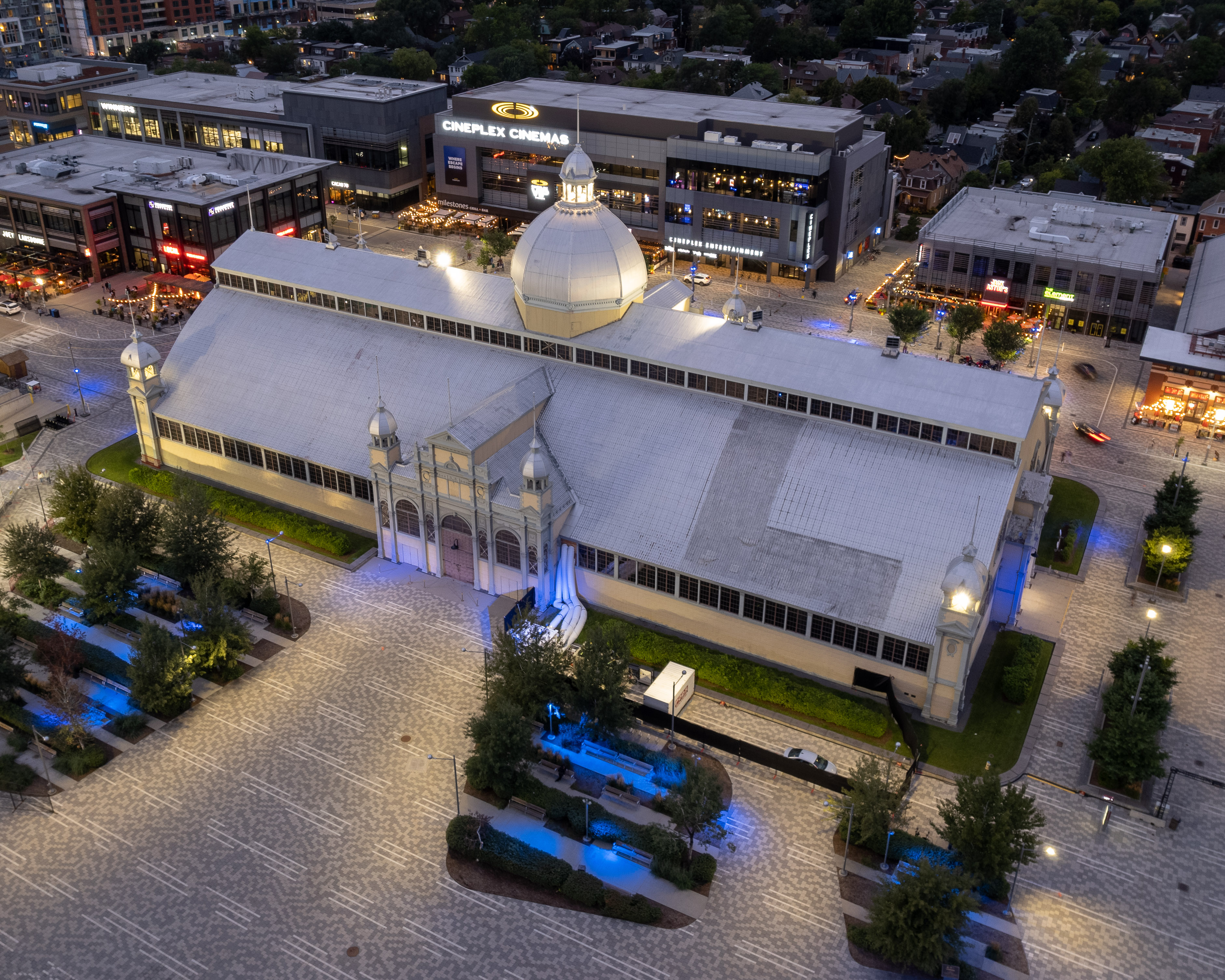
- The Aberdeen Pavilion in 2021
- Former names: "Cattle Castle" (informal)

General information
- Type: Exhibition Hall
- Architectural style: Victorian
- Location: 1000 Exhibition Way; Ottawa, Ontario; K1S 5J3
- Coordinates: 45°24′00″N 75°40′58″W
- Completed: 1898
- Cost: CA$75,000 (1878)
- Owner: City of Ottawa

Design and construction
- Architect: Moses C. Edey
- Awards: Designated under the Ontario Heritage Act

National Historic Site of Canada
- Official name: Aberdeen Pavilion National Historic Site of Canada
- Designated: 1983

Ontario Heritage Act
- Type: Municipal Heritage Designation (Part IV)

The Aberdeen Pavilion (Pavillon Aberdeen in French) is an exhibition hall in Ottawa, Ontario, Canada. Overlooking the Rideau Canal, it is located in Lansdowne Park, Ottawa's historic fairgrounds. For many years, the building was known as the "Cattle Castle", due to its use for the Central Canada Exhibition's agricultural exhibits and shows. It is the last surviving Canadian example of what was once a common form of Victorian exhibition hall, and was designated a National Historic Site of Canada in 1983.

It is one of the oldest surviving indoor ice hockey venues in the world, although it is no longer used for ice hockey. It is the oldest surviving venue in which the Stanley Cup was contested, having hosted Stanley Cup challenge matches in 1904 between the Ottawa Hockey Club and challengers.

== History ==
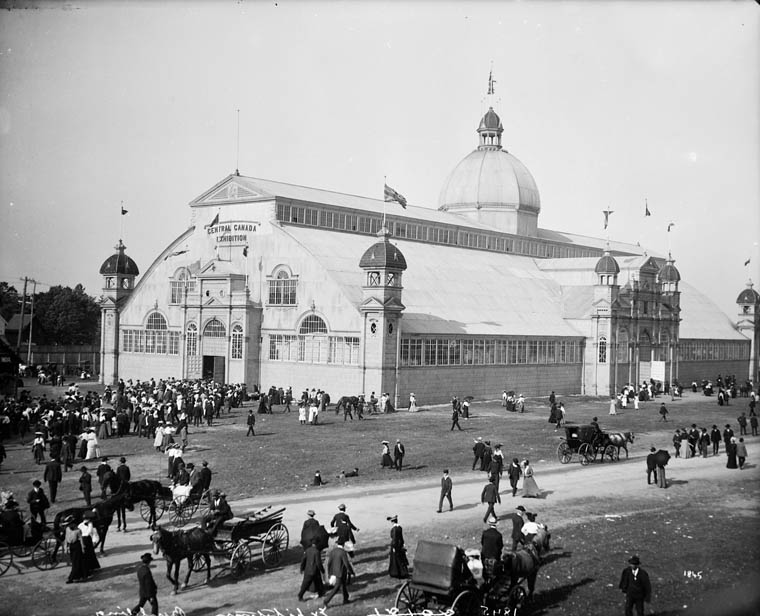
The Aberdeen Pavilion in 1903

The pavilion was built in 1898 to serve as the central hall for the Central Canada Exhibition. Designed by Moses C. Edey, it was inspired by London's Crystal Palace. It was named after Governor General Lord Aberdeen who presided over its opening. The structure was built by the Dominion Bridge Company, and took only two months and CA$75,000 ($3.21 million in 2025 dollars) to complete. The structure consists of a series of large steel arches holding up the roof. This allows for a large and column-free interior space of some 3,000 square metres (32,000 sq ft).

For many years, the main purpose of the structure was for agricultural shows, and from this came its "Cattle Castle" nickname. In wartime, the building became an important military structure. It was the home of Strathcona's Horse before they departed for the Boer War. In the First World War, it was the mustering point for Princess Patricia's Canadian Light Infantry, and it served as a general recruiting centre and the home to the Cameron Highlanders of Ottawa and the 4th Princess Louise Dragoon Guards during the Second World War.

=== Restoration ===
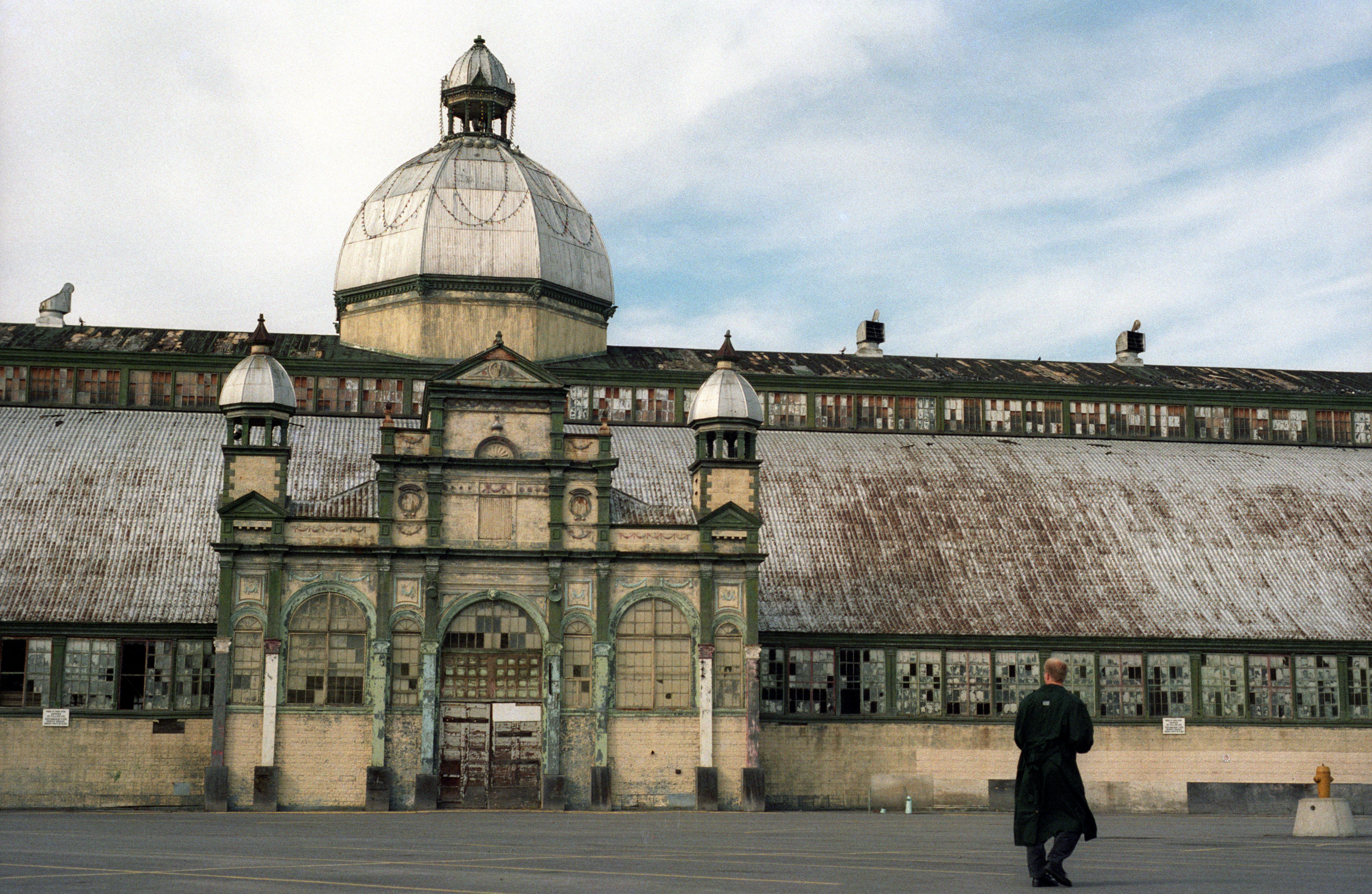
In 1991, the Aberdeen Pavilion was in such disrepair that City Council voted to demolish it; the decision was reversed in 1992.

In 1982, the building was designated a heritage structure under the Ontario Heritage Act, but it was showing its age, and required significant restoration work that would have cost several million dollars. Given serious structural problems, the pavilion had been closed to the public for a number of years. Many of the structure's windows were broken, the exterior paint was peeling, and the words "Cattle Castle" had been ignominiously painted on the front of the once elegant structure. City Council agreed to help finance the pavilion's restoration, but the federal and provincial governments refused to assist financially. In 1991, Ottawa City Council voted to demolish the building rather than pay the full restoration cost. The fate of the Aberdeen Pavilion became a major issue in the 1991 municipal election, and in 1992, City Council reversed its earlier decision and approved a basic renovation plan that cost CA$5.3 million. The newly restored structure re-opened in 1994.

In 2000, the Royal Architectural Institute of Canada chose the building as one of the top 500 buildings produced in Canada during the last millennium.

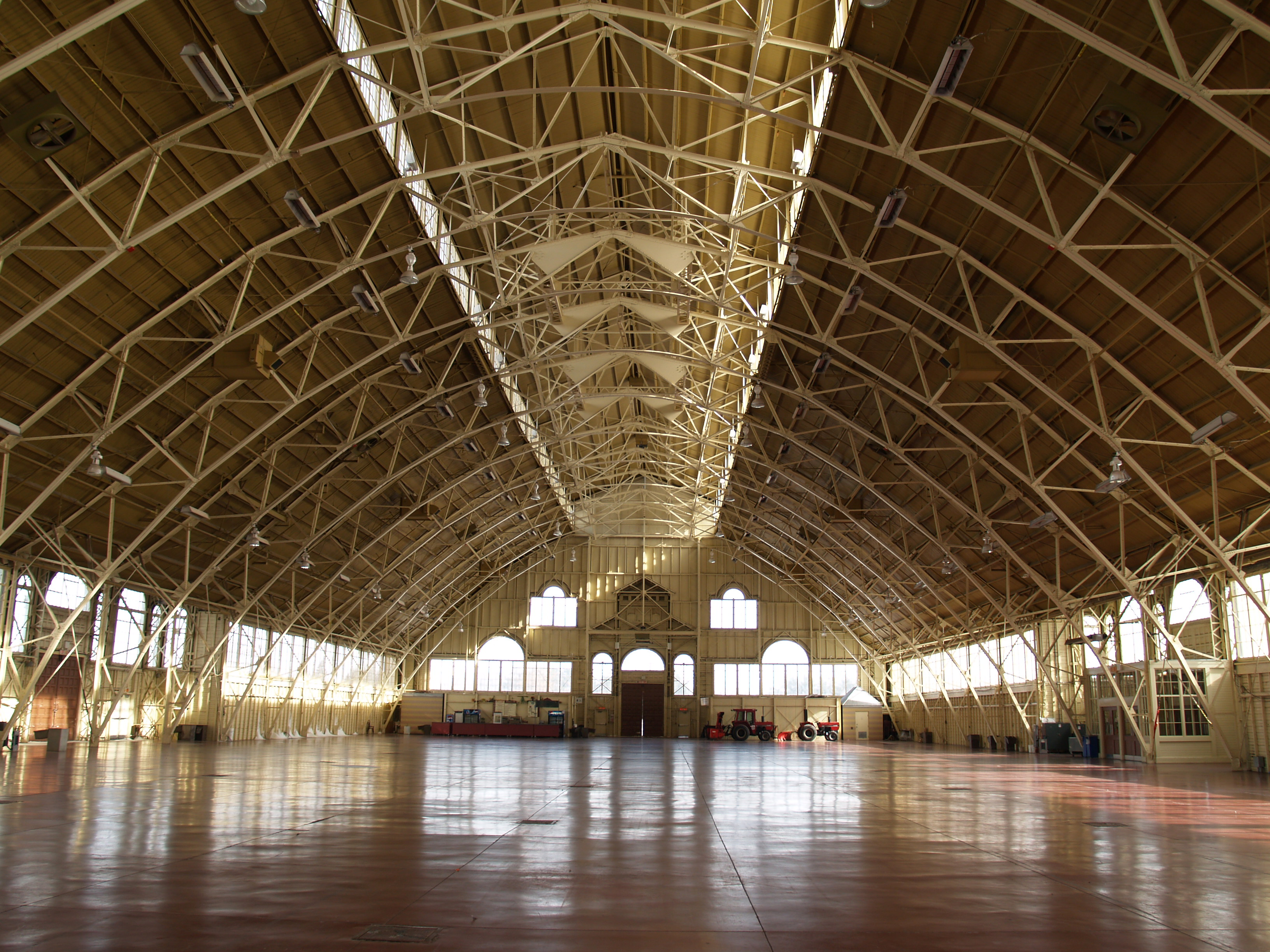
Aberdeen Pavilion - Interior

== Usage ==
The pavilion was used for many years to display cattle for the Central Canada Exhibition, which has since been discontinued. The pavilion is used for special events, and for the Ottawa CityFolk Festival in September each year since 2015. It is also used for a farmer's market during the winter months (during the summer, the market is outside) and a Christmas market in December.

In 2017, the pavilion was the host of Impact Wrestling's annual Bound for Glory pay-per-view pro wrestling show.

=== Sports usage ===
In 1902, the Ottawa Senators (then known as the Ottawa Hockey Club) built a hockey arena inside the Pavilion. In 1903-04, the club played the full 1904 season and Stanley Cup challenges in the Pavilion.

In 1918, the Ottawa Senators nearly moved to the Pavilion and investigated refurbishing it as an arena. Ted Dey (who had control over Dey's Skating Rink and The Arena) was not willing to rent time to the Senators. This turned out to be a ploy to gain control of the hockey club. The City of Ottawa was unwilling then to restore an ice rink inside the Pavilion, as bleachers had been built inside.

In 2017, as part of the NHL 100 Classic festivities, the Aberdeen Pavilion hosted participation events, exhibits, merchandise vendors and the like. After over 110 years, the Stanley Cup returned for a display at the Pavilion. The game itself took place nearby outdoors on the TD Place football field, played between Ottawa and Montreal.

== See also ==
- Ice hockey in Ottawa
