= George E. Bemi =

Canadian architect (1921–2023)

- Born: 26 September 1926; Winnipeg, Manitoba
- Died: 22 May 2023 (aged 96); Ottawa, Ontario
- Education: University of Manitoba (BArch 1951)

George Edward Bemi (26 September 1926 – 22 May 2023) was a Canadian architect who practiced in Ottawa, Ontario, from 1955 to 2005. During his prolific career, he contributed over 300 buildings to the National Capital area, including significant projects such as St. Basil's Church, the Main Branch of the Ottawa Public Library, the downtown YM-YWCA, and the Ottawa Police Headquarters. His buildings are primarily designed in a Modernist or Brutalist style of architecture, characterized by massive concrete forms, asymmetrical volumes, curtain wall, honest materiality, and a play between solids and voids.

== Early life ==
Born into a low income family on September 26, 1926, Bemi grew up in a working-class neighborhood in the north end of Winnipeg, Manitoba, Canada. At the age of fifteen, he dropped out of school and took up odd jobs to help support his family. On the outbreak of WWII, he enlisted in the Navy at only seventeen and served as a stoker for two years. Although after returning from the war he had no plans to become an architect, he was rejected from the fire–fighting department because he was still too young to be accepted into the pension plan. He then approached the Department of Veteran affairs, an organization developed to help veterans re-integrate into society. Since, he had previously shown promise at drawing in school so it was suggested he become a draftsman.

The Department of Veteran Affairs offered a month-for-month education program in which war veterans were entitled to one month of free education for every month served in the war. Grants were provided for those who wished to continue onto university afterwards. Through this program, Bemi completed an accelerated high school diploma at the Ford Plant, one of the temporary schools set up to educate war veterans. He subsequently went on to study architecture at the University of Manitoba, graduating in 1951.

== Career ==
Bemi emerged from university during the post-war construction boom and immediately established a contracting business, Associated Architectural Services. The service completed construction drawings for architecture firms that were not able to handle the sudden influx of projects. He then went on to work for Defense Construction Limited, a government organization formed in 1951 with the mandate to expedite construction of military projects due to the Korean War. From there, he obtained a position with the Canadian Mortgage and Housing Corporation, a government organization established in 1946 to deal with post-war housing shortages. CMHC transferred Bemi to Ottawa where he continued to practice for the remainder of his career.

In 1955, he joined the Montreal firm of Greenspoon, Freelander, and Dunn, as the architect in charge of their Ottawa division. Two years later, when the firm asked him to relocate to Montreal for the Jeanne-Mance slum clearance project, he declined and established his own firm of Bemi & Associates. He continued his own architecture practice until 2005, designing over 400 buildings and garnering several professional awards. In 2000, he was inducted into the Royal Architectural Institute of Canada’s College of Fellows for his contributions to architecture in the National Capital region.

== Death ==
George E. Bemi died on May 22, 2023, at the age of 96.

== Architectural works ==
George E. Bemi's earlier works were primarily Modernist buildings, but as his firm matured it evolved a Brutalist style of architecture. Projects such as Sampan Restaurant and Champlain Towers, which both won Ontario Architecture Association awards, exhibit strong modernist qualities: an exposed structure, a minimal and refined palette of materials, a lack of ornamentation, and a grid system. Later works reflect more expressive characteristics of the Brutalist style. The firm's more important government commissions, including the Ottawa Congress Centre and the Ottawa Downtown Library, were part of this later body of work. These projects established Bemi & Associates as one of the leading architecture firms practicing in the National Capital region at the time.

=== St. Basil’s Church 1960 ===
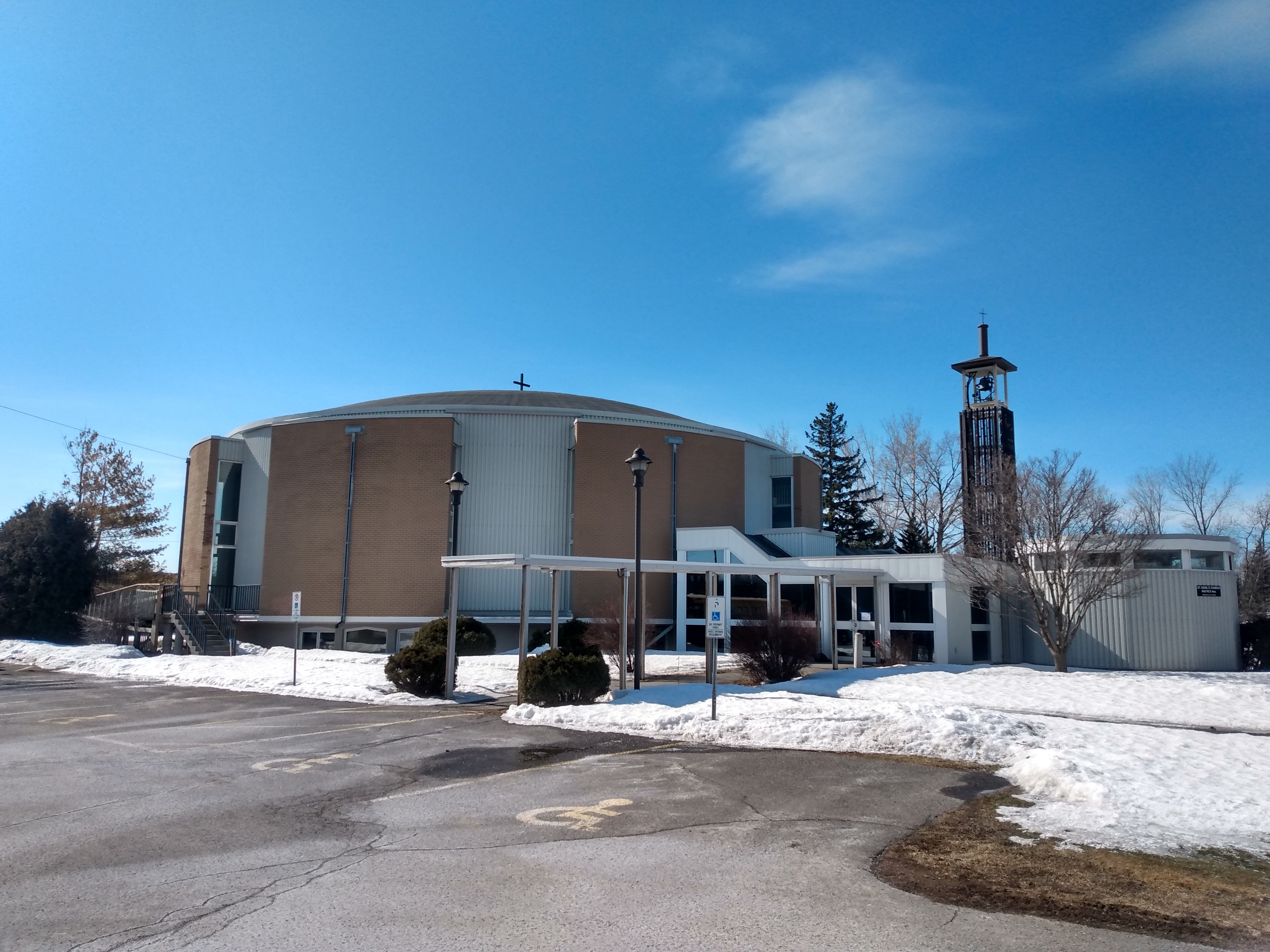
The church as seen on a snowy day

In 1959, Bemi & Associates hired Tim Murray and from 1960 to 1962 the firm became Bemi, Murray & Associates. In 1960, the firm completed its first major recognized work, St. Basil's Roman Catholic Church. The intimate, circular design fit seating for 700 people within 70 feet of the altar. Due to the close nature of the church, an acoustical study was done to limit echoing. As a result of the study's recommendations, the unique form of the church emerged. The design consisted of undulating walls topped by a thin-shelled concrete dome, sunken so that its centre point lay below grade. The most innovative aspect of the design was that the priest faced the congregation, six years before this was approved by the Second Vatican Council.

=== Ottawa Public Library Main Branch ===
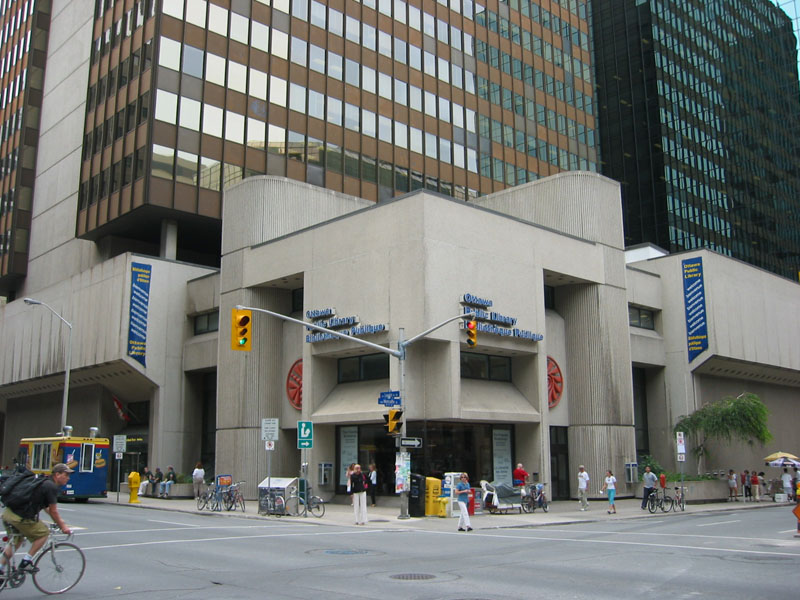
The library in modern day

The Ottawa Downtown Library is a concrete, sculptural, Brutalist building and was the firm Bemi & Associates’ most notable project. The building replaced the neo-classic Carnegie Library that was demolished due to unstable soil conditions. A 10-foot high stained glass window was preserved from the Carnegie Library and incorporated into the foyer of the new library. At the time of its completion in 1973, Canadian Architect wrote of the project: "In the middle of this urban desert, George Bemi’s Ottawa Public Library sits as an unexpected and welcome relief". The white, precast concrete stands in contrast to the surrounding glass office towers and preserves the identity of the library. Due to its compact nature it became the first building in North America to lease its air rights, a controversial legal problem at the time. It is once again the subject of debate over its size. Critics of the library say it is too small, outdated, and inaccessible to function as the main library branch. While proponents of the building claim that it is Ottawa's best surviving example of Brutalist architecture.

=== Ottawa Congress Centre ===
The Ottawa Congress Centre was designed by a consortium of Bemi, Pye, and Richards Architects Associated and was opened by Pierre Elliot Trudeau in 1983. It was a tight design problem, bounded by a bridge to the South, Daly Street to the North, and the Rideau Centre to the East. Situated on the former railway lands, the project was part of a revitalization initiative for the downtown core. The building itself was Brutalist style architecture, consisting of intersecting terraces of textured concrete. It was lauded for its integration into the site and the inclusion of public artworks, containing a mural by the Canadian artist David Gerry Partridge. The Ottawa Congress Centre was demolished between 2008 and 2009 and a new Convention Centre, designed by Brisbin Brook Beynon Architects (BBB Architects), opened in 2011.

=== Terry Fox Elementary School ===
Designed in 1979, the Terry Fox Elementary School was an exploration in plug-in, plug-out architecture. The main hub of the school was fixed, while the classroom wings were prefabricated, detachable units that could be added to the hub as the school's population increased. At the time, the Ottawa School Board was expanding rapidly and many students were being taught in temporary, portable structures. The design was awarded the American Association of School Administrators’ Educational Design Award for its innovative attempt to create flexible, portable classrooms that are simultaneously comfortable and aesthetic.

== Other notable projects ==
(Listed chronologically)

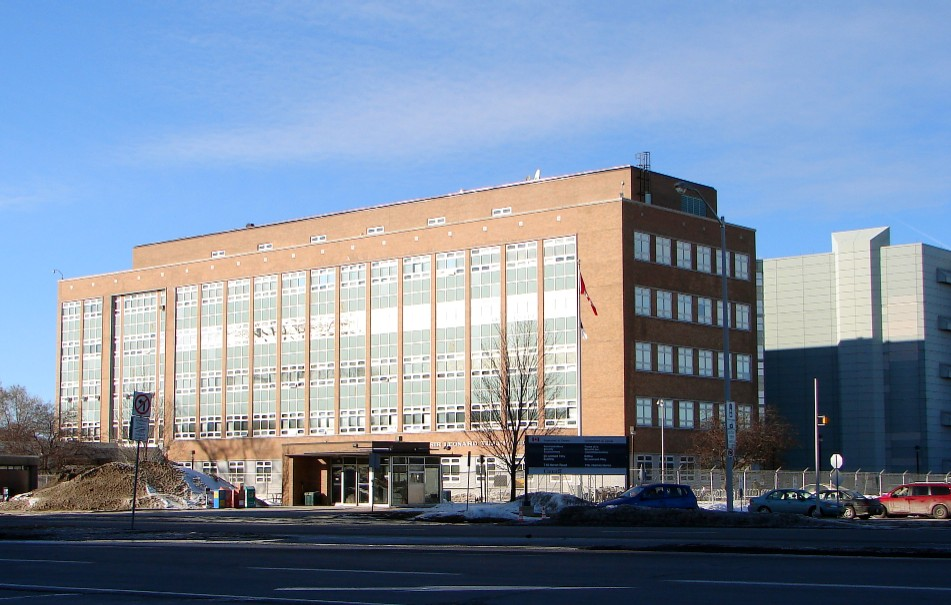
Sir Leonard Tilley Building

- Champlain Towers (1959) O.A.A Design Award
- St. Basil's Church (1960)
- Colonel By Towers (1960)
- Firestone House (1960)
- St. Bartholomew's Church (1962)
- Post Office in Carlton Place (1963)
- Rhodes Real-Estate Building (1963)
- Constitutional Hall (1963)
- Sampan Restaurant (1964) O.A.A. Design Award
- Virus Research Laboratory (1964)
- The Ottawa YM-YWCA (1965)
- Bell Canada Building Vanier (1972)
- Rideau Valley Middle School (1973)
- Headquarters for the CBC (Lanark Street) (1974)
- Tartan Housing Project (1975)
- Terry Fox Elementary School (1979)
- Base Maintenance Building (1979)
- Ottawa Congress Centre (1982)
- Ottawa Police Services building (1983)
- Hintonburg Community Center (1984)
- West Carleton Secondary School (1986)
- Sir Leonard Tilley Building (1987)
- The Grace Hospital Addition (1987)
- Bell Canada Regional Headquarters on Rideau Street (1990)
