= List of works by W. E. Noffke =

W. E. Noffke was an architect in Ottawa, Ontario, Canada, best known for his residential works. His houses, some of the grandest in the city at the time, are designed in a large variety of styles, most in an eclectic style, often with Mediterranean influences. Most of his extant houses are in the Glebe neighbourhood, specifically the Clemow Development. The other major location for his residential buildings includes Sandy Hill, with many others in smaller neighbourhoods around the city of Ottawa. Noffke also designed several high-profile Ottawa institutional buildings, including the Central Post Office, Blackburn Building, Hope Building and several embassies. Most of Noffke's projects are located in the greater Ottawa area; however, he has made contributions to communities all across the country.

== Table key ==
Demolished or destroyed Regularly open to the public Residential or Private Ownership

== Completed works ==
This list is a chronological list of selected residential, commercial buildings, government projects, and other works by W. E. Noffke.

Name	Location (Street)	City	Province	Year built	Other Information	Image	Ref.
W. E. Noffke House	209 Wilbrod Street	Ottawa	Ontario	1904	Noffke's first home built for him and his bride, Ida.		
Bank of Ottawa	186 Bank Street	Ottawa	Ontario	1906	Classical Greek motifs including temple front facade		
Union St. Joseph du Canada	325 Dalhousie St.	Ottawa	Ontario	1906	Stone and brick Richardsonian Romanesque commercial building built with above-ground stores		
Charles Ogilvy LTD.	126-132 Rideau St.	Ottawa	Ontario	1907	a Classical Revival commercial building		
J.J. Cadville Residence	443 Daly Ave.	Ottawa	Ontario	1907	Now the Embassy of the Polish Republic, with a small extension added later		
CCEA Grandstand	Lansdowne Park	Ottawa	Ontario	1909	Included a fire station and sub police station, TD Place Stadium now sits on the lot		
George J. Bryson House	207 MacLaren Street	Ottawa	Ontario	1909	A residence built in Centretown reminiscent of the Victorian era		
David V. Ranger	395 Daly Avenue	Ottawa	Ontario	1909	Two-storey townhome in Sandy Hill		
Laurier House Garage	335 Laurier Avenue East	Ottawa	Ontario	1909	An automobile garage built for Sir Wilfrid Laurier		
Hope Building	61-63 Sparks St.	Ottawa	Ontario	1910	Classically influenced high-rise also nicknamed the "Bible House"		
Clemow Development	The Glebe	Ottawa	Ontario	early 20th c.	City beautification plan due to the rise in population led to an architecturally diverse upper-class neighbourhood in the Glebe. The land came from part of Miss H. Adelaide Clemow's property, which gave the community its name.		
Hayden House	534 Queen Elizabeth Dr.	Ottawa	Ontario	1910	Currently the Greek Embassy just off the Rideau Canal		
Blackburn Building	85 Sparks St.	Ottawa	Ontario	1912	A classically influenced commercial building with early-age fireproofing		
Machinery Hall	Lansdowne Park	Ottawa	Ontario	1912	Series of machinery structures built for Lansdowne Park		
Charles Hopewell House	11 Clemow Avenue	Ottawa	Ontario	1912-1913	Yellow brick residence built for the mayor of Ottawa at the time, Charles Hopewell, in the new Clemow development		
W.F. Powell House	85 Glebe Ave.	Ottawa	Ontario	1913	A Spanish Colonial residence, now the Embassy of Vietnam		
Plaza Building	45 Rideau St.	Ottawa	Ontario	1913	A commercial building in the heart of downtown with ornamentation on the upper storeys		
Austin E. Blount House	515 O'Connor St.	Ottawa	Ontario	1913	Currently the Embassy of the Republic of Tunisia		
G. Frederick Hodgins House	517 O'Connor St.	Ottawa	Ontario	1913	Residence built with Frank Lloyd Wright-inspired features		
W.E. Noffke House	20 Clemow Ave.	Ottawa	Ontario	1913	Noffke's first home he built for his family, based on Stickley's Craftsman aesthetic		
Ernest C. Powell House	12 Allan Place	Ottawa	Ontario	1913	Spanish Colonial Revival style residence		
St. Luke's Evangelical Lutheran Church	326 Mackay St.	Ottawa	Ontario	1914	A Tudor-Gothic church for the German congregation of New Edinburgh		
Iona Mansions	1123-1131 Wellington St.	Ottawa	Ontario	1914	Tudor Gothic commercial property		
Lansdowne Park		Ottawa	Ontario	1914	Lavatories for women that flank the Horticulture Building at Lansdowne Park		
Francis X. Plaunt House	1 Clemow Ave.	Ottawa	Ontario	1915	Currently the Ghana High Commission		
Holbrook Apartments	404 Elgin Street	Ottawa	Ontario	1915	Utilitarian apartment buildings built for builders and developers		
Ottawa Car Garage	352 Albert St.	Ottawa	Ontario	1916	Ottawa Car Manufacturing Company garage and showroom		
Vimy Apartments	244 Charlotte St.	Ottawa	Ontario	1919	The apartments were named in honour of the battle at Vimy Ridge		
Fire Hall No. 10	260 Sunnyside Ave.	Ottawa	Ontario	1920	A low-slung fire hall in Spanish-Colonial Revival, now a community centre		
The Street House	18 Range Road	Ottawa	Ontario	1920	A Prairie-Style home, currently the Embassy of the Democratic Republic of Congo		
St. Anne's Rectory	17 Myrand Ave., Anglesea Square	Ottawa	Ontario	1921	The Roman Catholic Church was built in the Beaux-Arts style		
Champagne Public Baths	321 King Edwards Ave.	Ottawa	Ontario	1922	The public baths are one of two in the city; the pool's front facade is classically ornamented		
J. N. Rougvie House	Alymer	Lucerne	Quebec	1922	A Spanish-style residence built for John N. Rougvie		
St. George's Parish Hall and Rectory	415 Piccadilly St.	Ottawa	Ontario	1923	Gothic Revival style Roman Catholic Church		
Ethel Chamberlain House	18 Clemow Ave.	Ottawa	Ontario	1923	Tudor Revival home with bulging roofs		
Project for Commercial Building		Los Angeles	California	1925	Project for a 14-storey building with a landing strip above an oval parking garage		
Congregation Mackziky Adaths	239 King Edward Ave.	Ottawa	Ontario	1926	Romanesque-style synagogue		
Levi W. Crannell House	26 Clemow Ave.	Ottawa	Ontario	1926	A Mission-style residence built with inspiration from the Spanish Colonial Revival style		
Corpus Christi School	Fourth Ave. and Lyon St.	Ottawa	Ontario	1926	Roman Catholic elementary school built to serve the Roman Catholic population of the neighbourhood		
Dr. Albert Charlebois House	203 Chapel Street	Ottawa	Ontario	1927	An L-shaped pediatrician's office and residence		
Chauncey R. Bangs House	236 Queen Elizabeth Dr.	Ottawa	Ontario	1927	A Modernist residence built on the Driveway with elements inspired by Spanish and California styles		
H. A. Plant House	245 Clemow Ave.	Ottawa	Ontario	1927	A Mediterranean-style home equipped with a sunroom and separate breakfast room		
Kert Apartments	180 Augusta St.	Ottawa	Ontario	1927	A Sandy Hill apartment building for the middle-class		
Ottawa General Hospital	25-43 Bruyere St.	Ottawa	Ontario	1927	Noffke added an addition to the 4th storey of the General Hospital. Today it goes by the name Elizabeth Bruyere Health Centre.		
Medical Arts Building	180 Metcalfe St.	Ottawa	Ontario	1928	Art Deco high-rise with Spanish and Egyptian influences		
F.W.G. Mohr Residence	540 Acacia Rd.	Ottawa	Ontario	1928	Nicknamed "Greystone" for its grey rusticated exterior. Current residence of the Korean Ambassador		
Ambassador Court Apartments	612 Bank St.	Ottawa	Ontario	1928	Art Deco-inspired condo suites		
J. Ambrose O'Brien Residence	453 Laurier Ave. E	Ottawa	Ontario	1928	Tudor Revival mansion, now Le Cordon Bleu. Noffke contributed Alterations to the residence		
S.F. Kirkpatrick Residence	539 Island Park Drive	Ottawa	Ontario	1929	Tudor-Gothic style home, now residence of the Peruvian Ambassador		
O'Brien Theatre	334 Raglan St. S	Renfrew	Ontario	1929	Was owned and operated by Ottawa Valley Amusement, part of a small chain with one other Theatre in Arnprior		
W.F. Powell House	27 Clemow Ave.	Ottawa	Ontario	1929	Tudor-style residence in Clemow Development		
Immaculata High School	211 Bronson Ave.	Ottawa	Ontario	1929	Originally a catholic high school for girls run by the Grey Sisters, now the Bronson Centre		
Ambrose O'Brien Country Residence	650 Chemin du Meech Lake	Chelsea	Quebec	1929	Locally resourced cottage with a picturesque lakeside view		
St. John Evangelical Lutheran Church	274 Concorde Ave.	Toronto	Ontario	1930			
G. Bates Residence	32 Range Road	Ottawa	Ontario	1930	Classically inspired homestead, currently the Embassy of the Bolivarian Republic of Venezuela		
St. Theresa Roman Catholic Church	95 Somerset St. E	Ottawa	Ontario	1930	Romanesque Revival with Mediterranean flavour		
Christ the King Church and School	254 Argyle Ave.	Ottawa	Ontario	1930	intimate church with neo-classical references		
Department of Mines Building Complex	Booth and Rochester St.	Ottawa	Ontario	1930-1940	Complex of offices and laboratories with classical motifs		
Chapel of Hulse Bros. Funeral Home	315 McLeod St	Ottawa	Ontario	1932	Tudor Revival style for Anglophone patrons		
Richard Noffke House 182 Glenora Ave.	Ottawa	Ontario	1933	Spanish Colonial Revival style home built for a relative of Noffke			
Epstein Apartments	115-119 O'Connor St. and 151-55 Laurier Ave. W	Ottawa	Ontario	1933	Apartment with high-class finishes for middle-class tenants		
Mother House, Soeur Grises del la Croix	9 Bruyere St.	Ottawa	Ontario	1935	Indication of Noffke's turn in practice following the Great Depression towards larger building projects		
Archibald W. Peterson House	140 Ruskin St.	Ottawa	Ontario	1935	Tudor-inspired residence in newly developing neighbourhood of Westboro		
Moses Greenberg and Morris Goldberg Houses	124 & 126 Ruskin Street	Ottawa	Ontario	1935	Pair of Tudor and Georgian Revival homes built adjacent to one another		
Royal York Apartments	180 Lisgar St.	Ottawa	Ontario	1935	Neo-modernistic apartment building, originally connected to a similar apartment on the parallel street		
Redeemer Lutheran Chapel	725 Ferguson St.	North Bay	Ontario	1935	Gothic-inspired church in a picturesque location		
Department of Mines Complex	Booth St.	Ottawa	Ontario	1937-1944	Complex built with six laboratories right before World War II		
Central Post Office	59 Sparks St.	Ottawa	Ontario	1938	Monumental building in the heart of Ottawa, Château-style structure with Art Deco references		
W. E. Noffke House	255 Harmer Ave.	Ottawa	Ontario	1939	Noffke’s third family home, built in collaboration with his son and interior designer, W. Edgar Noffke		
Churchill Apartments	Friel and Besserer St.	Ottawa	Ontario	1941	Multi-storey apartment block built in Sandy Hill		
St. Jean Baptist Roman Catholic Church	500 Isabella St.	Pembroke	Ontario	1941	Typical Roman Catholic Church design		
Athlone Apartments	Maclaren St. at Metcalfe	Ottawa	Ontario	1942	Centretown apartment block		
Trinity Evangelical Lutheran Church	619 Sherbourne St.	Toronto	Ontario	1944	Gothic Revival, traditionally for a German-speaking audience		
Salon D'Or	179 Prom. du Portage	Gatineau	Quebec	1947	Banquet room located in Chez Henri Hotel, with Baroque inspiration		
No. 5 Rideau Gate	15 Sussex Dr.	Ottawa	Ontario	1947	Stone cottage, current residence of the South African Embassy		
Trinity Evangelical Lutheran Church	746 Colborne St	London	Ontario	1949	Art Moderne		
Crane Ltd. Office and Warehouse	288 Catherine St.	Ottawa	Ontario	1949	Brick and glass building built after the war with pre-war Art-Deco elements		
C. P. Mahoney Residence	842 Tavistock Rd.	Ottawa	Ontario	1952	Britannia Heights bungalow demonstrates Noffke's taste for warmth and protection of the home		
Our Saviour Lutheran Church	715 Roosevelt Ave	Ottawa	Ontario	1954	Gothic Revival with International Style influence		
Standish Hall Hotel	2 Rue Montcalm	Gatineau	Quebec	1954	Noffke restored this building after the 1951 fire, now demolished in the early 1970s		
Embassy of Russia	285 Charlotte Street	Ottawa	Ontario	1956	Stalinesque; Soviets monitored design and construction closely		
J. R. Linn Residence	303 Cunningham Ave.	Ottawa	Ontario	1956	Vernacular-inspired wartime bungalow built in developing neighbourhood of Alta Vista		
Mount Calvary Lutheran Church	933 Smyth Road	Ottawa	Ontario	1957	This structure acknowledges Noffke's shift in interest to Modernism		
