= High Commission of South Africa =

The High Commission of South Africa may refer to these South African embassies:

- High Commission of South Africa, New Delhi in India
- High Commission of South Africa, London in the United Kingdom
- High Commission of South Africa, Ottawa in Canada
