= Canada–South Africa relations =

- Canada: South Africa

Canada and South Africa established bilateral relations in the 1930s. Both countries are former British colonies and share similar cultures in terms of sports and language. Both countries are members of the Commonwealth of Nations.

It is estimated that as of 2006 around 38,310 South Africans resided in Canada.

== Relations ==
Canada's relationship with South Africa can be traced back to 1899, when Canada sent more than 7,000 troops to support Britain in its war against Transvaal and the Free State. The two countries collaborated closely in transforming the British Empire into the Commonwealth, exchanging High Commissioners in the 1930s and then ambassadors after South Africa left the Commonwealth in 1961. In September 1936, the Canadian prime minister William Lyon Mackenzie King visited London, where he met the South African high commissioner to Britain, Charles te Water. Te Water was a close friend of the South African prime minister J. B. M. Hertzog and was given much leeway to act as he saw fit. King told te Water the Dominion Office was "just a glorified Colonial Office" whose officials did not treat him with respect, an assessment that te Water shared. Te Water became close to King and in September 1937 visited Ottawa, where it was agreed that South Africa and Canada would establish diplomatic relations. Alexander Cambridge, 1st Earl of Athlone also served as governor-general of both Canada and South Africa with William McKenzie and Jan Smuts as prime ministers respectively.

In December 1948, te Water returned to Ottawa to lobby the new prime minister Louis St. Laurent who had replaced Mackenzie King after his retirement that year to lobby him to have Canada vote against condemning South Africa at the United Nations for its apartheid policy. Te Water told St. Laurent that it greatly mattered to his government that the fellow members of the Commonwealth should stand with South Africa. The meeting went very badly with St. Laurent failing to offer the expected support, causing te Water to declare that he had come to Ottawa to discuss practical politics, not "philosophical problems". St. Laurent told te Water "how opposed he was in principle to the philosophy which lay beyond the Union's racial policies", saying that Canada would vote at the UN to condemn South Africa for apartheid.

Canada and South Africa had active diplomatic and economic ties during the latter country's apartheid era. In 1961, the then Canadian Prime Minister John Diefenbaker called for the expulsion of South Africa from the Commonwealth of Nations during that year's Commonwealth Prime Ministers' Conference: Yves Engler has argued that this was motivated by a desire to hold the Commonwealth together, as the non-white Commonwealth members such as India, Pakistan, Ceylon (modern Sri Lanka), Malaya, Nigeria, Ghana and Sierra Leone threatened to leave the organisation if South Africa remained, quoting an official from the Canadian Department of External Affairs as saying that "nothing has been more constant in Diefenbaker’s approach than his search for a tolerable way of averting South Africa’s withdrawal", and noting Diefenbaker's refusal to cancel the trade agreement the two nations had signed in 1932.

In 1964, Tommy Douglas asked Diefenbaker's successor, Lester B. Pearson, in a House of Commons question if he would exert pressure on the South African government to use clemency in sentencing Nelson Mandela and seven associates after they had been convicted in the Rivonia Trial. Pearson replied that as the defendants had not yet been sentenced, it would be "improper" for the Canadian government to make public comment on the convictions or sentencing. In the early 1970s the Montreal Gazette reported that the South African Police had received training in intelligence gathering from the Royal Canadian Mounted Police. Although the government of Pearson's fellow Liberal Pierre Trudeau formally supported the UN arms embargo on South Africa, the then-publicly owned Canadair sold the South African government's forestry department amphibious water bombers, which it promoted as being especially useful for "internal troop-lift operations". In 1982, also under Trudeau, the Canadian government cast its 4.91 percent of International Monetary Fund votes in favour of extending a billion dollars of credit to South Africa, helping to form a narrow majority of 51.9 percent of the vote in support of loan, despite the opposition of 68 IMF members and five of the fund's executive directors, who argued that South Africa did not meet the standards of conditionality expected of other recipients of credit.

The Canadian government recognised the African National Congress in 1984. Sanctions on South Africa were introduced by the government of Brian Mulroney in 1986, after they had been introduced by several other countries and Canada maintained diplomatic relations, unlike nations such as Norway, Denmark, New Zealand, Brazil and Argentina. From October 1986 to September 1993, when sanctions were in place, trade between the two nations was worth $1.6 billion, 44 percent of the value of trade between 1979 and 1985.

The post-apartheid Constitution of South Africa was, in part, inspired by the Constitution of Canada, particularly the Canadian Charter of Rights and Freedoms. Former South African President Nelson Mandela made an official state visit to Canada in September 1998 and spoke at the Human Rights Monument in Ottawa. Mandela was made an honorary Canadian citizen, during his second visit to Canada. A 2003 visit by President Thabo Mbeki in November 2003, ended with the signing of the Joint Declaration of Intent to strengthen relations between the two countries.

Canada has assisted South Africa in the areas of development (over $200 million) and the fight against AIDS in South Africa and to strengthen services provided by the Government of South Africa.

Bilateral consultations between the two countries are held annually typically focusing on issues relating to foreign policy, trade, defence and economic development.

As of 2014/15 Canadian government assistance to South Africa focuses on four issues:

1. Improved service delivery with a focus on the poor
2. Institutional capacity building of South African government and civil society organisations
3. Improve management of natural resources
4. Promote a high level of skills, ethics and integrity within government.

== High-level visits ==
High-level visits from Canada to South Africa

- Prime Minister Jean Chrétien (1999, 2002)
- Governor General Michaëlle Jean (2006)
- Governor General David Johnston (2013)
- Prime Minister Stephen Harper (2013)
- Prime Minister Mark Carney (2025)

High-level visits from South Africa to Canada

- Deputy President Nelson Mandela (1990)
- President Nelson Mandela (1998)
- President Thabo Mbeki (2003)
- President Jacob Zuma (2010)
- Deputy President Kgalema Motlanthe (2013)
- President Cyril Ramaphosa (2018, 2025)

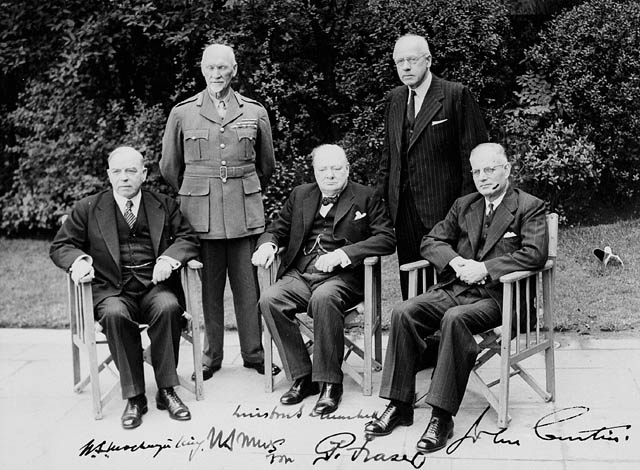
Prime Ministers of Canada W.L. Mackenzie King and of South Africa Jan Smuts, along with the Prime Ministers of Britain, Australia and New Zealand in London; May 1944.

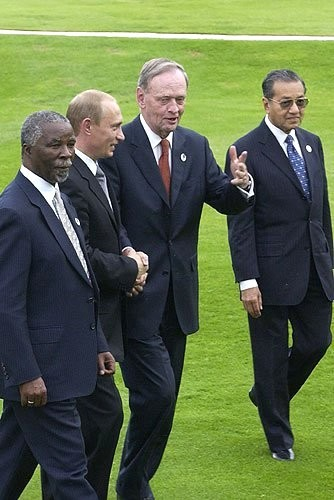
Prime Minister Jean Chrétien and President Thabo Mbeki in Évian-les-Bains, France; June 2003.

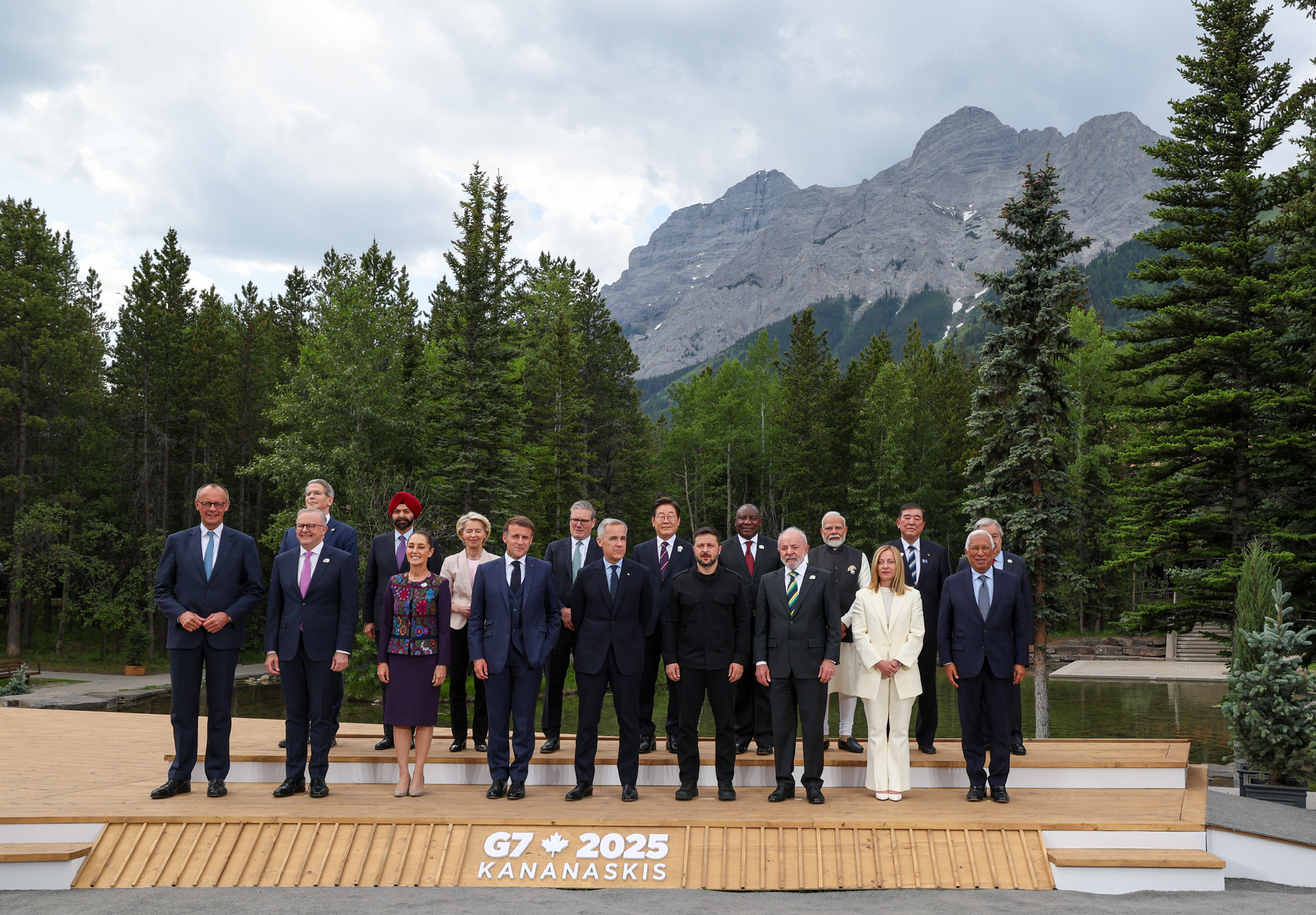
Prime Minister Mark Carney and President Cyril Ramaphosa attending the 51st G7 summit in Kananaskis, Alberta, Canada; June 2025.

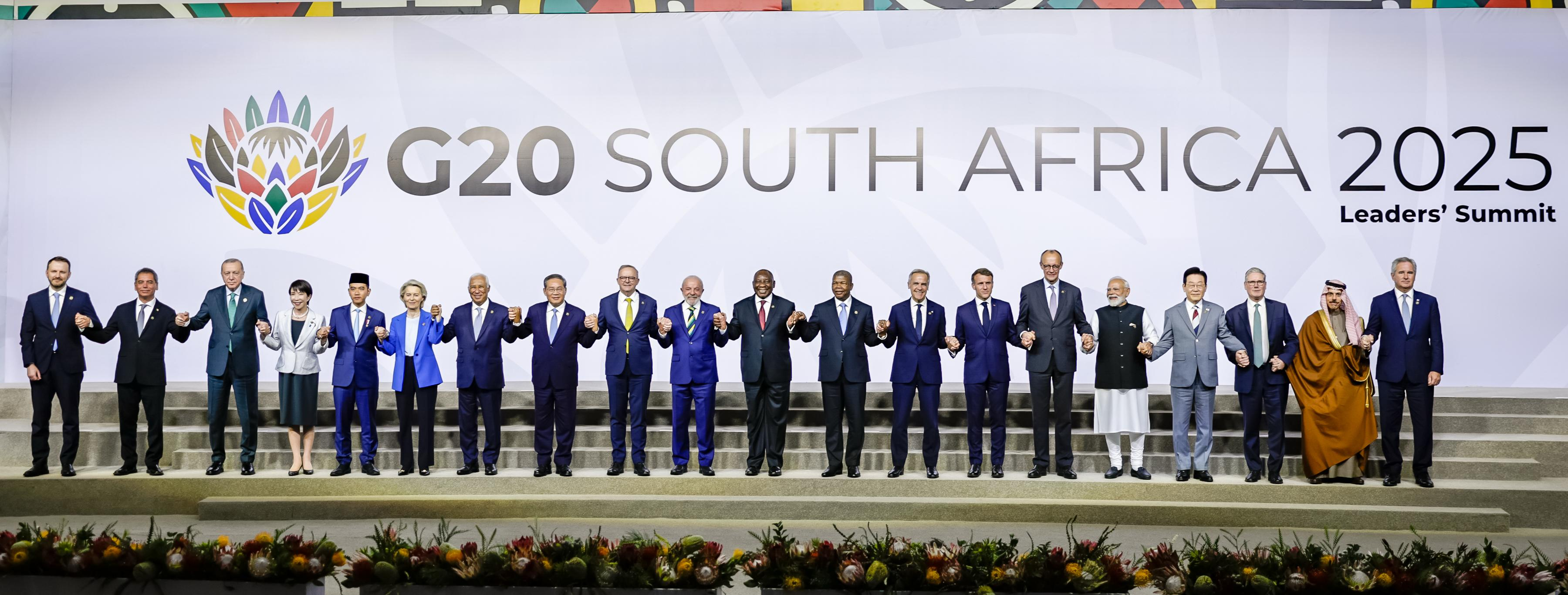
President Cyril Ramaphosa and Prime Minister Mark Carney attending the G20 Johannesburg summit; November 2025.

== Trade ==
In 2024 South African exports to Canada totaled US$2.9 billion. Both countries are members of the Cairns Group.

South Africa is a major access point for Canada to access the African market. Canada is an important investor in the South African economy with Canadian companies having investments in a range of South African industries including transportation, food processing, hospitality, information and communication technologies, and instrumentation sectors with the largest focus of Canadian investment being in the mineral and mining sector.

== Resident diplomatic missions ==
of Canada in South Africa

- Pretoria (High Commission)

of South Africa in Canada

- Ottawa (High Commission)
- Toronto (Consulate-General)

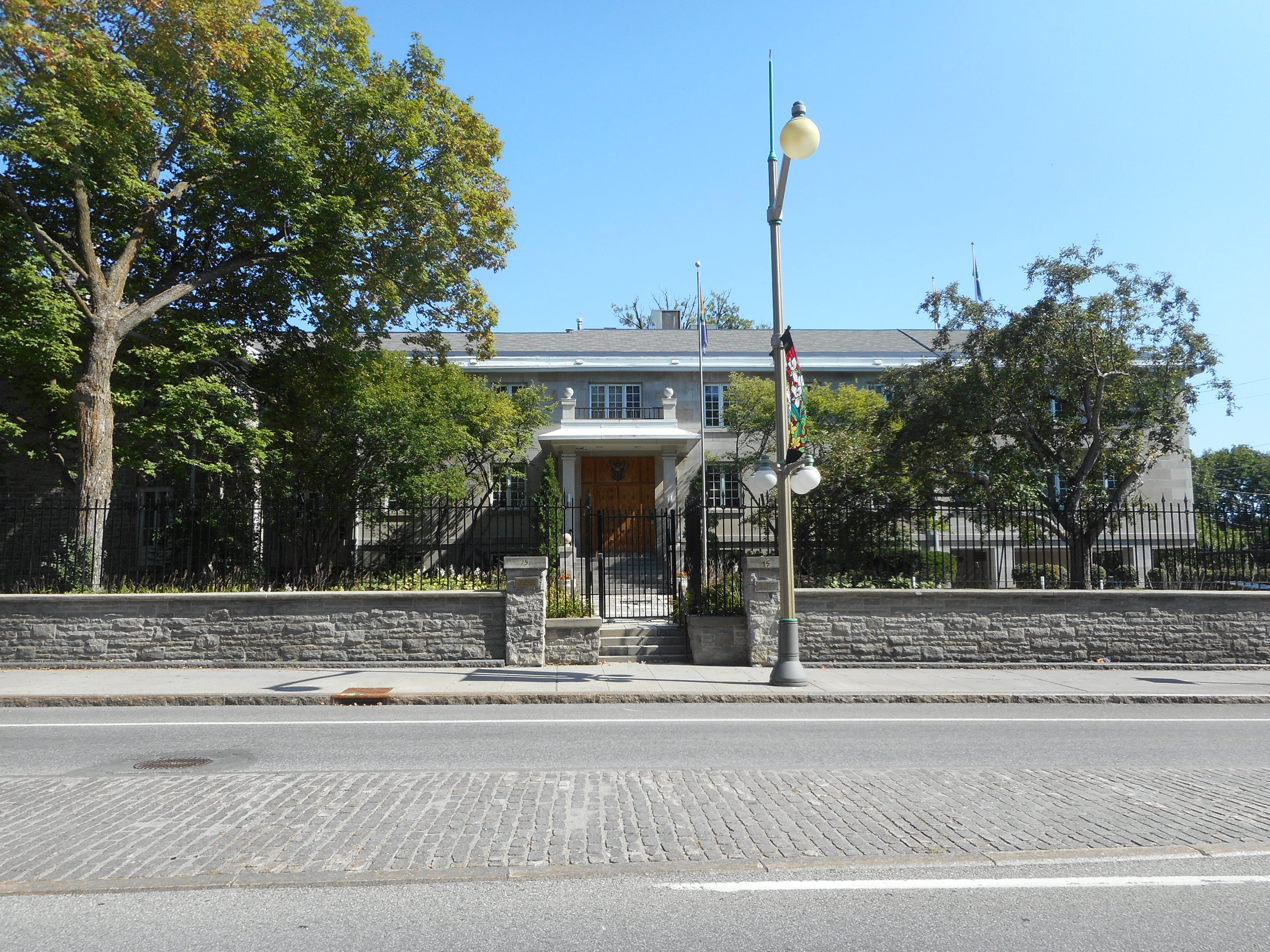
High Commission of South Africa in Ottawa

== See also ==
- Foreign relations of Canada
- Foreign relations of South Africa
- South African Canadians

== Books and articles ==
- Reid, Escott (1971). "Five Memories of Louis St. Laurent 1946-49". In Norman Penlington (ed.). On Canada: Essays in Honour of Frank H. Underhill. Toronto: University of Toronto Press. pp. 71–82. ISBN 978-1-4875-7746-9.
- Tennyson, Brian Douglas (1982). Canadian Relations with South Africa: A Diplomatic History. Lanham: University Press of America. ISBN 0819126322.
