= Shepherd Mdladlana =

South African politician (1952–2024)

South African High Commissioner to Canada
- Incumbent
- Assumed office September 2012
- Preceded by: Mohau Pheko

Minister of Labour
- In office July 1998 – 30 October 2010
- President: Jacob Zuma; Kgalema Motlanthe; Thabo Mbeki; Nelson Mandela
- Preceded by: Tito Mboweni
- Succeeded by: Mildred Oliphant

Personal details
- Born: 12 May 1952 Keiskammahoek, Cape Province, Union of South Africa
- Died: 18 October 2024 (aged 72)
- Party: ANC
- Education: University of South Africa
- Occupation: Politician
- Profession: Teacher

Membathisi Mphumzi Shepherd Mdladlana (12 May 1952 – 18 October 2024) was a South African politician who served as the South African High Commissioner to Canada. He was born in Keiskammahoek, Eastern Cape.

== Life and career ==
Mdladlana was born in Keiskammahoek, Cape Province, Union of South Africa on 12 May 1952.

From 1998 until 2010, he served as Minister of Labour, following his appointment by Nelson Mandela. A teacher by training, Mdladlana earned a Bachelor of Arts from the University of South Africa in 1997 in education and the IsiXhosa language. From 1972 to 1981, Mdladlana was a teacher at Vukukhanye Primary School in Gugulethu, a township outside of Cape Town. From 1982 to 1994, he was the principal of Andile Primary School in Crossroads, Western Cape. In 1994, the Eastern Cape native was elected to the first non-racial parliament in South African history with the African National Congress. In 1998, President Nelson Mandela appointed him to the position of Minister of Labour. He served under four Presidents: Mandela, Thabo Mbeki, Kgalema Motlanthe, and Jacob Zuma.

Mdladlana died on 18 October 2024, at the age of 72, from COVID-19.
