= Bronson Centre =

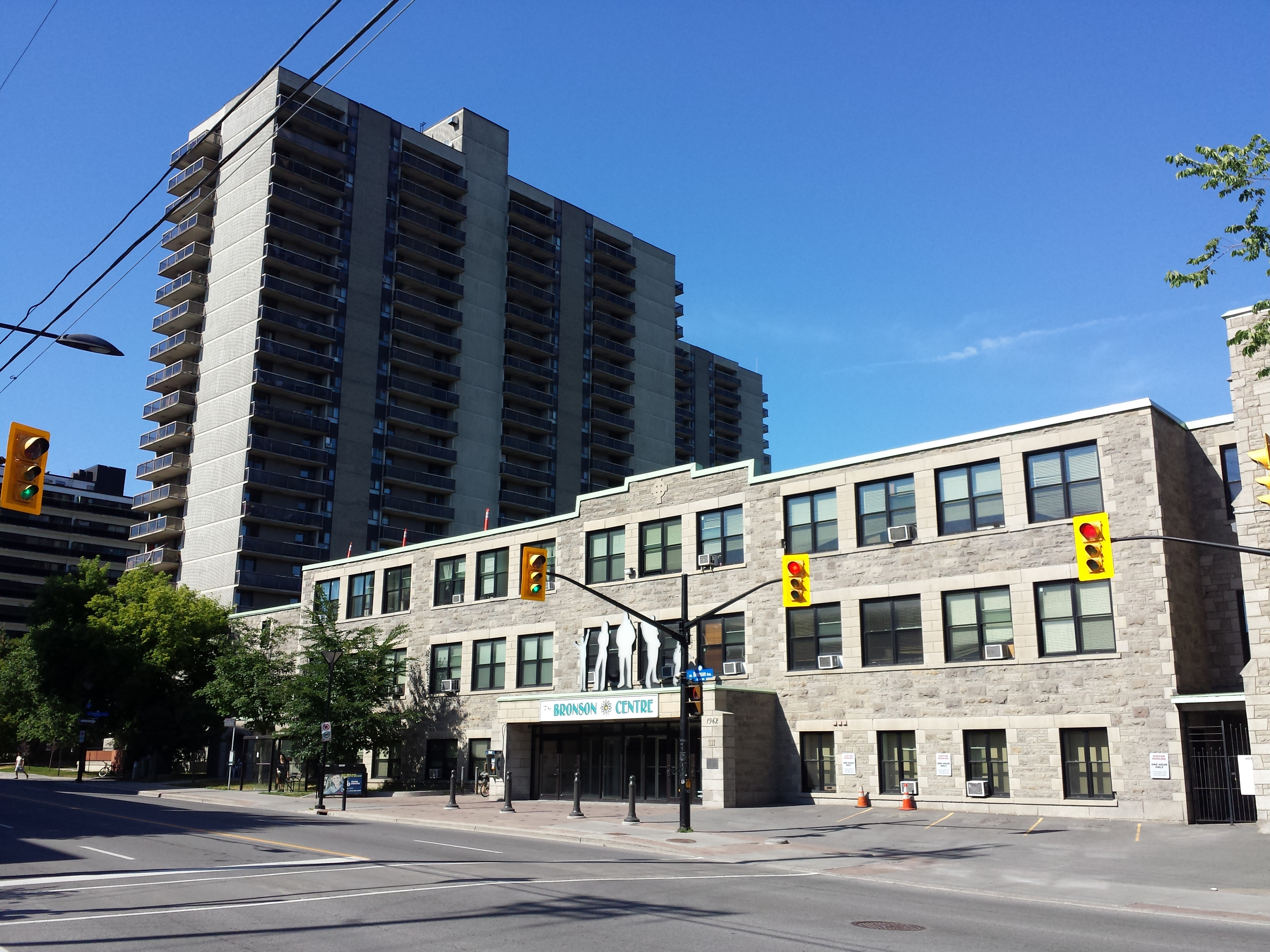
- Bronson Centre
- Interactive map of Bronson Centre
- Address: 211 Bronson Ave, Ottawa, ON K1R 6H5
- Coordinates: 45.413611°N 75.706389°W
- Seating type: Reserved seating
- Type: Concert Hall

Website
- bronsoncentremusictheatre.com

The Bronson Centre is a community facility in Ottawa, Ontario, Canada, which provides office and meeting facilities for non-profit organizations. It is located at 211 Bronson Avenue, on the western edge of the city's downtown core.

The building was the original site of Immaculata High School, which was originally constructed in 1928 and expanded several times until the school relocated in 1994. The Grey Sisters religious order, owners of the building, spent CA$400,000 to transform the building into office space and other community facilities. The facility reopened as the Bronson Centre in 1996, operating under a non-profit administration.

== Theatre ==
The main theatre facility has a capacity of 900 seats and has featured concerts by musicians such as Jello Biafra, Matthew Good, Emily Haines, Melanie C, Sarah Harmer, Lady Gaga, Tory Lanez, Michel Pagliaro, Gowan, and Sigur Rós.
