= Glenn Babb =

South African politician and diplomat

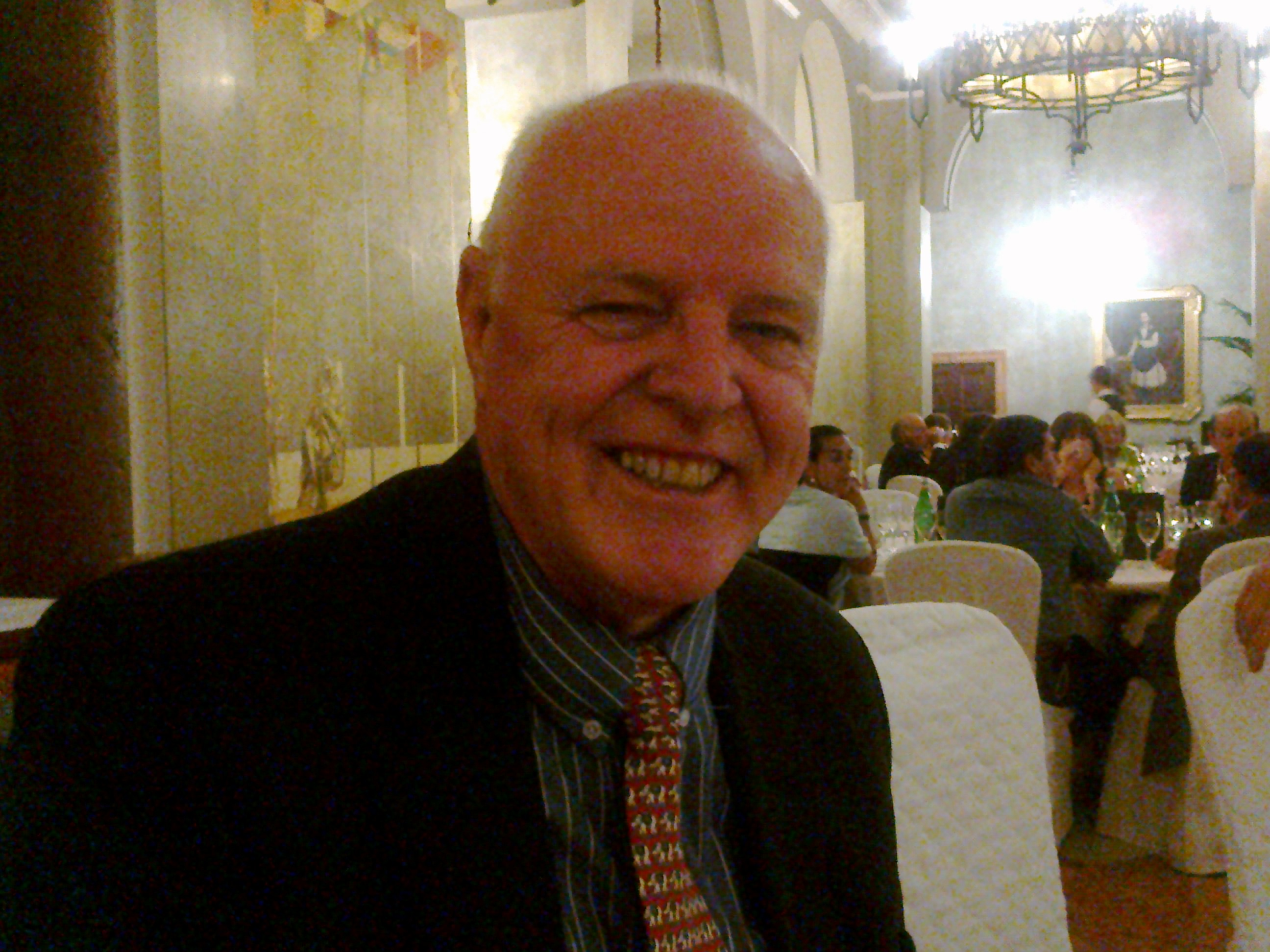
Glenn Babb in Verona

Glenn Robin Ware Babb (4 June 1943 - 25 June 2024) was a former politician and diplomat for the former apartheid government in South Africa. More recently he was a businessman and entrepreneur. From 1985 to 1987 he had a high-profile posting in Canada where he was his government's ambassador to Ottawa and made frequent public statements against the anti-apartheid movement and in defence of his government and in opposition to the movement for economic sanctions on and disinvestment from South Africa that the Canadian government was leading internationally.

Babb was educated at Stellenbosch University and at Oxford having been awarded the Joerg Gosteli bursary. While at Oxford, he rowed with the Lincoln College VIII and was part of the first crew to attempt to beat the Guards' record of fifteen and half hours for rowing from Oxford to London. Thereafter he joined South Africa's Department of Foreign Affairs. He also earned a law degree from the University of South Africa with a distinction in Constitutional Law.

== Family ==
Glenn Babb was born in Johannesburg to Eric Ware Babb and Ora Constance Loverock, and was educated at St John's College, Johannesburg, a private school for boys. At St John's he was made Head of House and won the trophy for the best Drum Major in the Witwatersrand Command band competition. His maternal great-grandfather, Charles Doering, came from a prominent Ontario family (United Empire Loyalists) which owned the Doering Stock and Dairy Farm in Chesterville, Ontario. Charles Doering with his brother Frederick became the first dentists in Johannesburg. Frederick famously gave dental treatment to the imprisoned Leander Starr Jameson and his men after the Jameson Raid. Charles sent his son, Lawrence, to St John's College as a founder pupil in the Union Grounds. Five generations of his family have attended the same school. His paternal grandfather, Horace Edwin Babb, was once the owner of The Kraal, a house in Orchards, Johannesburg, where Gandhi took refuge. He later served on the South African Boxing Board of Control. Boxing was very much part of the family culture

=== Marriage ===
Glenn Babb married Tracey Dibb on 31 May 2003; Glenn Babb has two sons and two daughters.

== Early career ==
Babb worked as a schoolteacher in 1964 before continuing his education at Oxford University (Lincoln College). In 1967, he joined the Department of Foreign Affairs where he produced the book "Prison Administration in South Africa" while in the legal division of the Department. In 1969 he had his first overseas posting when he was assigned to the South African embassy in Paris where he served as secretary for three years.

During this time he was made Chairman of the Young Diplomats Association of Paris. He returned to Pretoria in 1972 and was Training Officer with the Department. He authored the book "Training for the Diplomatic Service".

In 1975, he returned to Paris where he was the embassy's counsellor and then in 1978, he moved to the South African embassy in Rome. Here he was asked to play cricket for the first Italian international team against the Indian Globetrotters and played in two matches. In 1981, he again returned to South Africa to become head of the Africa Desk at the Department of Foreign Affairs and held that position for four years.

== Ambassador to Canada ==
Babb's mission as Ambassador to Canada began in 1985 while South Africa was in crisis and international pressure on Pretoria was mounting. Canadian Prime Minister Brian Mulroney threatened to break off diplomatic relations with the country when he spoke at the United Nations.

During his two-and-a-half-year posting, Babb appeared on Canadian television more than 132 times and even more frequently on radio. He heavily lobbied politicians, journalists, intellectuals and universities in support of the Reagan Administration's policy of "constructive engagement" rather than sanctions or divestment. Babb referred to apartheid as a relatively "benign policy" and a means of controlling "urbanization" and claimed that sanctions would harm South African blacks more than the white minority. He also said of sanctions, "Whether you shoot the zebra in the white stripe or the black stripe," he said, "you are going to kill the zebra." He claimed that the disruption of mineral production in South Africa was in the interests of the Soviet Union and that South Africa was the only force standing in the way of an expansion of Soviet intervention in the African continent.

Many of Babb's appearances across Canada were met with protests. In 1985, when he was speaking at the University of Toronto's Hart House, anti-apartheid activist Lennox Farrell hurled the debating society's ceremonial mace at him. In Montreal, when entering the private Mount Stephen club to give a speech, club members and Babb were pelted with eggs and snowballs by protesters who called him "racist scum". In 1986, Babb appeared on the CBC Radio program Sunday Morning to debate Montreal human rights lawyer Irwin Cotler. The appearance was picketed by 50 anti-apartheid activists.

He was interviewed by the famous Jack Webster in Vancouver who told him: "You're doing very well, laddie". Elizabeth Grey of CBC spent a day with him and submitted her report for the broadcasting prize of 1985. His first interview after arrival in Ottawa was on "Crossfire" which immediately launched public interest in his frank and direct approach to what he regarded as the Canadian misapprehensions about South Africa's future. Southam News' E Kaye Fulton followed his activities through Canada for a week and wrote a thought-provoking article which caught the nuances of the South African diplomacy in transition.

In an article in Fortune, Babb compared South Africa's treatment of its black population with Canada's treatment of Native peoples. "The media reaction was phenomenal, and some Indian leaders said I was on the right track," said Babb retrospectively. Accepting an invitation by Chief Louis Stevenson, Babb made a high-profile visit to a First Nations reserve, the Peguis Band in Manitoba, with media in tow, in order to press his point. Thereafter, delegations from the Indian representative body, the Assembly of First Nations, visited South Africa and gave credence to the view that there was indeed a comparative advantage for South African blacks.

In 1987 he addressed the Royal Military College, Kingston, Ontario on the "Strategic Value of South Africa".

== Return to South Africa ==
In 1987, Babb was recalled to South Africa to take over as head of the Africa division and deputy director-general of the Department of Foreign Affairs. As such, he initiated, after a meeting with President Sassou Nguesso of the Republic of the Congo, the Brazzaville talks for the withdrawal of South African troops from Angola and ending the country's involvement in the South African Border War.

In the 1989 general election in South Africa, he entered politics as the ruling National Party's candidate in the constituency of Randburg. He was the first ever National Party candidate to share an election platform with a black person. President F.W. de Klerk made a point of visiting his constituency during polling day. He was eventually defeated by Wynand Malan, co-leader of the liberal Democratic Party. His was the only constituency which recorded an increase in voters for the NP which lost 31 seats in Parliament in the election. He was nevertheless appointed to a seat in the South African parliament by F.W. de Klerk who, as State President, had the constitutional right to fill four seats in the House of Assembly, the whites-only chamber of the tricameral Parliament, through direct appointment. While in Parliament, he formed the Felix Trust. Founded to promote peaceful race relations in South Africa, its first Trustees were Wendy Ackerman, Aggrey Klaaste, Peter Bedborough, Danie le Roux and Thijs Nel (and later Pieter Toerien): it donated a fountain "Peace in Africa" to the University of Pretoria, built ceramic housing with an innovative heating process and nominated Thuli Madonsela, Public Protector, for the Civil Courage Prize in New York where for the second time ever the Train Trust awarded an Honorable Mention to her.

Babb subsequently left parliament after two years, in 1991, and returned to the Department of Foreign Affairs, serving as South Africa's ambassador to Italy During that time, South Africa established diplomatic relations with Albania, Malta and San Marino, to which he was accredited as ambassador. He was appointed the first South African Permanent Representative to UN Food and Agriculture Organisation since 1963.

Between 1991 and 1992, he participated in the Mozambican peace negotiations in Rome between RENAMO and FRELIMO under the aegis of the Rome Sant' Egidio community. His role is mentioned positively in Sant' Egidio's report on the success of the Peace Protocol. During his ambassadorship in Rome, he was nominated to be South Africa's Commissioner at the Venice Biennale in 1993 and 1995. South Africa participated for the first time in three decades again in 1993 with an impressive exhibition of several artists' work called "Incroce del Sud" which received good reviews. He was also appointed in 1991 by the Board of the Non-Catholic Cemetery in Testaccio as the administrator of the cemetery and presided over the 200th anniversary of Shelley's birth - both Shelley and Keats are buried in the cemetery.

He also served as Commissioner of the Commonwealth War Graves Commission in Italy. In 1995, Babb left government service. Later that year he became chairman of AGIP Lubricants. From 1995 to 2002 he was a trustee of the Arthur Childe Army Award Trust.

In 1997 he was appointed Director of the Cape Philharmonic Orchestra. A year later, he was appointed consultant to the government of the Western Cape and he continued in that role till 2002. In the same year, he was appointed Honorary Consul General of the Republic of Turkey with jurisdiction for the Western, Northern and Eastern Cape Provinces.

In 1999 he arranged Profumo d'Italia Flavour of Italy with the backing of the Italian Ambassador and the Italian-South African Chamber of Commerce and Industry at the V&A Waterfront, a wide-ranging promotion of Italian goods which included a masked ball, two nights of opera, a gondola on the harbour, stands for Maserati and Alfa Romeo, two Italian film stars, Franco Nero and Claudia Pandolfi, who opened the Italian film evenings, Italian music in the Amphitheatre and Italian cooking and cheese-making lessons. Two million people visited the event.

In 2005, his firm Babrius was appointed by the Secretariat of the African, Caribbean and Pacific Group of Countries [ACP] aligned to the EU to write a report, "Study on the Future of the African, Caribbean and Pacific Group of Countries" which was published in French and English by the ACP in Brussels on 13 February 2006

Babb was chairman of the Owl Club, from 2006 to 2007, a gentlemen's club, in Cape Town.

In 2010 he authored the monograph "Abubakr Effendi - A young Turk in Afrikaans" relating to the work of the Islamic scholar sent in the 19th Century by the caliph to instruct the Muslims of the Cape. He has also been active with various business pursuits such as long-lasting milk [PARMALAT], oil lubricants, manufacturing, a tourism service, manufacturing wine vats and owning an office support and internet service.

In January 2009 Babb was shortlisted for the position of Chief Executive Officer of NEPAD in the African Union.

In December 2012 he published an article in the African Yearbook of Rhetoric on rhetorical action in diplomacy with specific reference to the relative fortunes of Indians in Canada and indigenous peoples in South Africa. This led to an interview on CBC Radio.

In July 2014 Babb was appointed chairman of the Ethics Committee of Southern Wind Shipyard and non-executive director of the company.

In September 2015 Babb organised the international Sol d'Oro Southern Hemisphere Olive Oil competition in Cape Town which ended with a gala prize-award evening at the residence of the first Italian ambassador to South Africa, Casa Labia. It was attended by the Premier of the Western Cape, Helen Zille, and the Minister of Agriculture, Alan Winde.

He was elected Chairman of the Muizenberg Historical Conservation Society in December 2016. In October 2018 he was elected Trustee of the Fish Hoek Valley Museum.

In 2022 he published his diplomatic memoirs under the title "In One Era and out of the Other" (Footprint Press) In 2023 he published a book on Johannesburg and his family's history in the city under the title "My Joburg Family"

== Publications ==
Babb has published short stories and poetry, articles on legal subjects, and numerous other reports and articles, including:

- Prison Administration in South Africa. Department of Foreign Affairs, 1968.
- Training for the Diplomatic Service. SA Institute for International Affairs, 1975.
- South Africa: Where we stand. C-FAR Canadian Issue Series, 1986.
- Il Capo: una delle prime citta d'acqua del Nuovo Mondo. Aquapolis Quarterly, International Centre Cities on Water, 2000, Vol 3–4.
- The Future of the African Caribbean and Pacific Group of Countries. ACP/28/012/06 Brussels, 13 Feb 2006.
- Abubakr Effendi: Among the Young Turks in Afrikaans. Quarterly Bulletin of the National Library of South Africa, 2010, Vol 64, No 1.
- International rhetoric and diplomatic discourse "African Yearbook of Rhetoric" Vol 3, No 3 2012
- Cape Town's Devious Designs Cape Times 1 April 2014
- Kanada Trap Steeds Klei Rapport 31 January 2016
- SA, Pik Botha, die Pleidooie en Sir Percy Rapport 20 August 2016
- Die Kaap en die k-woord (The Battle of Muizenberg 222 years later) Rapport 6 August 2017
- Muizenberg's Famous Station False Bay Echo 27 September 2018
- Ons taal se begin in die Bo-Kaap Rapport 5 January 2020
- The Hollowness of the National Party's Foreign Policy and the Hollow Man who Pursued it - Pik Botha: an Assessment https://politicsweb.co.za/opinion/the-hollowness-of-pik-botha
- Revolution and White Privilege https://politicsweb.co.za/opinion/on-revolutions-and-white-privilege
- African despair https://www.politicsweb.co.za/opinion/african-despair
- Nee vir Turkye se boelie Islamis Rapport 17 January 2021
- Glenn Babb: "Ek het nie uitgesluit gevoel op US" Rapport 28 March 2021
- "Le Canada ne peut pas donner des lecons aux chinois" fr.sputnik.news.com>radio 17 June 2021
- Siedaar: Kanada se eie apartheid Rapport 5 September 2021
- Is Westerse Breinselle met 'n Siekte Besmet? Rapport 26 June 2022
- In One Era and out of the Other - copyright Glenn Babb ISBN 978-1-77634-555-7 2022 Published by Footprint Press, South Africa pages 506 www.footprintpress.co.za
- My Joburg Family copyright Glenn Babb ISBN 978-0-6398050-6-1 2023 Published by Footprint Press, South Africa pages 183 www.footprintpress.co.za

== See also ==
- Foreign relations of South Africa
- Angola-South Africa relations
