= Trinity Evangelical Lutheran Church (Toronto) =

- Trinity Evangelical Lutheran Church
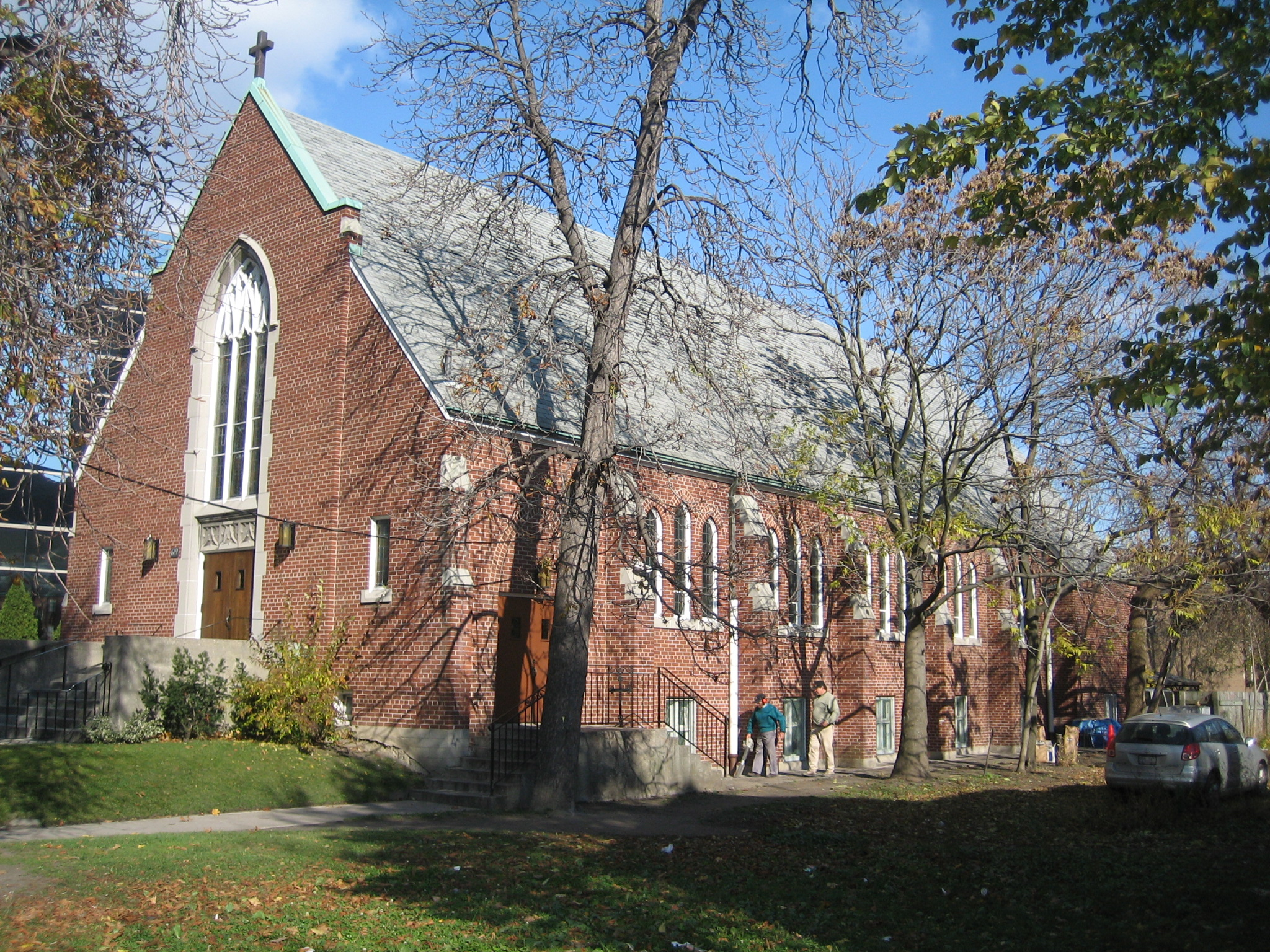
- Trinity Evangelical Lutheran Church
- Trinity Evangelical Lutheran Church
- 43°42′N 79°24′W
- Location: 619 Sherbourne Street; Toronto, Ontario; M4X 1L7
- Country: Canada
- Website: www.trinitytoronto.com

History
- Former name: Lutheran Church–Missouri Synod
- Founded: c. 1931

Trinity Evangelical Lutheran Church is a Lutheran Church–Canada congregation in Toronto, Ontario, Canada. The church was completed in 1952. It was designed by W.E. Noffke, who was a prolific architect in Canada, he designed many Lutheran church buildings across the province. It is located at the corner of Sherbourne and Bloor Street in the northeast of the downtown core. It was founded in 1931 as a Lutheran Church–Missouri Synod congregation, the second in the city after St. John's Lutheran Church. It originally catered to German immigrants in the city, and the services were all in German until the Second World War when it was decided to switch to English. After meeting in a number of temporary sites around the city, the church purchased land at Bloor and Sherbourne in 1943 and completed the present building in 1952. Services in German resumed, and as new immigrant groups to Canada arrived services began in other languages including Latvian and Estonian in 1952 and separate Korean services in 1988.
