= W. E. Noffke =

Canadian architect (1878-1964)

Werner Ernst Noffke
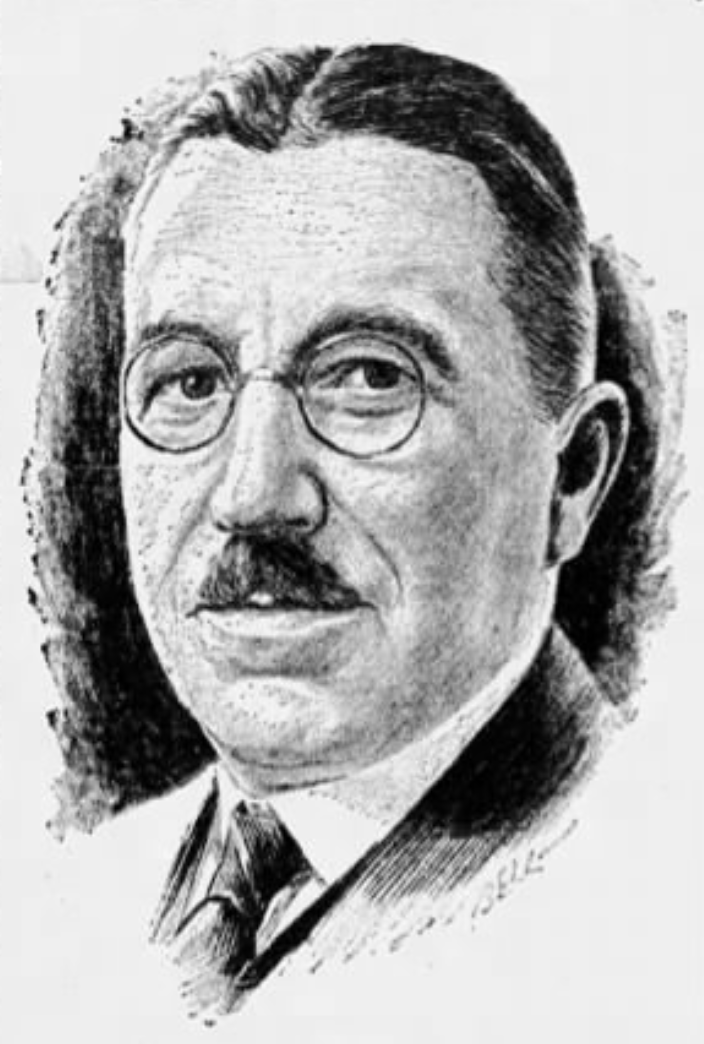
- Born: April 9, 1878; Stolp
- Died: July 30, 1964 (aged 86); Ottawa, Ontario
- Occupation: Architect
- Practice: Architecture
- Buildings: Central Post Office; St. Theresa's Catholic Church; Champagne Bath; Embassy of Russia
- Projects: Clemow Development
- Design: Eclectic

W. E. Noffke (1878–1964) was an architect in Ottawa, Ontario, Canada, best known for his residential works. His houses, some of the grandest in the city of the time, are designed in a large variety of styles, most in an eclectic style, often with Mediterranean influences. Most of his extant houses are in the Glebe neighbourhood, specifically the Clemow Development. The other major location for his residential buildings includes Sandy Hill with many others in smaller neighbourhoods around the city of Ottawa.

Noffke also designed several high-profile Ottawa institutional buildings, including the Central Post Office, Blackburn Building, Hope Building and several embassies. Most of Noffke's projects are located in the greater Ottawa area, however, he has made contributions to communities all across the country.

Noffke's initials stand for Werner Ernst, but his full first name is rarely used.

== Biography ==
Werner Ernst Noffke was born in 1878 in the German region of Stolp, which later became part of Poland. Werner was born to steelworker Franz J. Noffke and Henrietta Shillings, in 1883, the family immigrated to Canada. He grew up in Ottawa and attended German school at St. Paul Lutheran Church located on Wilbrod Street. To further his education, he later studied applied arts at the Ottawa School of Art. During his school career, Noffke won the Ontario School of Art mechanical and architecture medals in 1894 and 1895 respectively. In contingency with his education in arts, Noffke worked at a brickyard to save enough money to earn himself an apprenticeship at the age of 14 with a local Ottawa architect, Adam Harvey. Sadly, he could not take part in any academic architectural training as there were no programs available in Canada during his early years of education. In 1896, Noffke began working in the office of Moses Chamberlain Edey as a draftsman, Edey introduced him to many of his future clients. this opportunity boosted his popularity in the Ottawa area. Before starting his career in architecture, he was an instructor at Ottawa's first Technical School, teaching architectural drawing, in 1899.

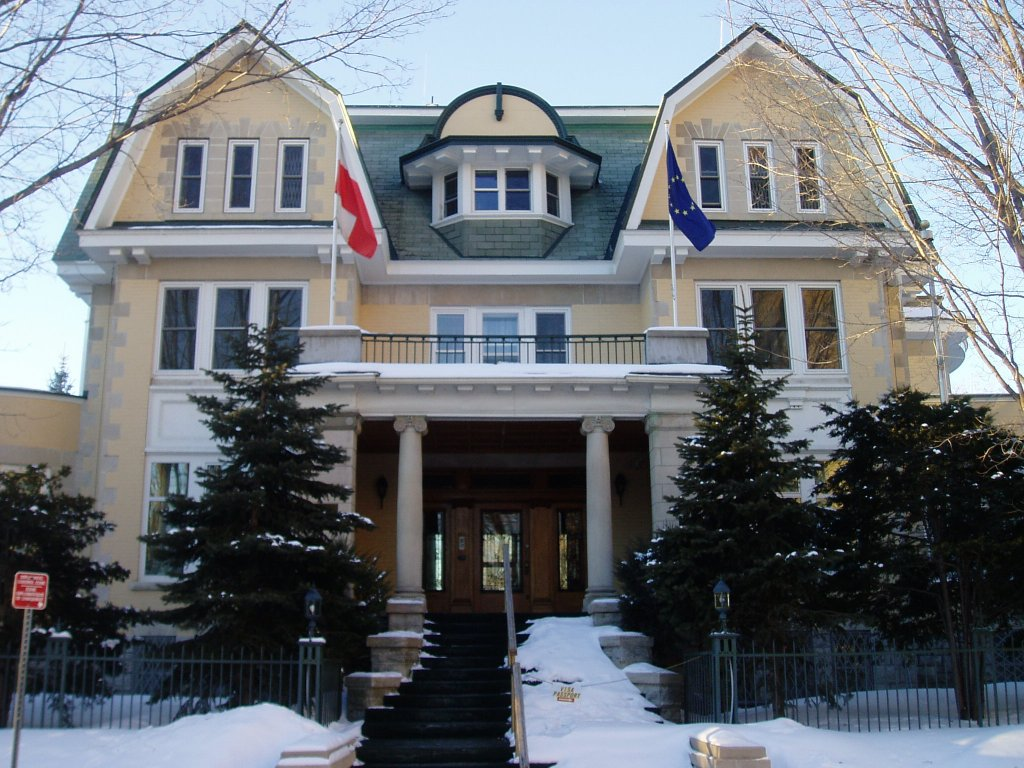
Noffke, J.J. Cadville Residence, 1907

Noffke opened his own firm in 1901. During his career he experimented with many different types of architecture, he built homes, Lutheran churches, commercial buildings, schools and many government projects. Several of his structures are distinctively a Noffke build due to his love for the Spanish Colonial- Revival style, and the deep red brick of the Georgian-Revival. He was additionally known to create projects in Romanesque, Gothic Revival, Art-Deco and many other styles, his architectural palate was never limited. In the early development of his career Noffke took part in many large milestones, he served on the Governor Generals Foot Guard for 14 years in 1901 to 1912 inclusively. At the GGFG Noffke was given the titles of major and armed guard of honour in 1914. He operated as the president of the Ontario Association of Architects (OAA) between 1910-1911 just a year after the association was founded. He additionally took part in the Architects Club of Ottawa and the Liberal Club. As his career evolved, he expanded his region of interest and contributed design ideas to many buildings across Ontario and all of Canada. In 1923 Noffke moved down to the United States and started up a small practice in Los Angeles, here he only worked for half a year, however, he was fortunate enough to meet Frank Lloyd Wright at his office in Taliesin before moving back to Canada in 1924. Most of Noffke’s projects were constructed in Ottawa including small towns in the greater Ottawa area, although some were erected in larger cities such as London and Toronto, and some of his schools appeared in provinces such as Saskatchewan and territories like the Yukon.

During many of these projects, Noffke worked with several local Ottawa architects on a variety of different building projects but never made an official partnership with anyone until 1954. Noffke partners with fellow Lutheran, Earle Ingram, for the latter part of his career and in 1961 the partnership concluded when W.E. Noffke retired from the practice. In response, Earle Ingram moved into his mentor's old office at 46 Elgin Street and opened his own practice under the name Earle Ingram and Associates. After retiring from the business Noffke enjoyed his remaining three years in his self-designed home on Harmer Ave. where he passes away in 1964 at the age of 86. Today many of his remarkable buildings have been marked as heritage sites, which preserves his contribution to Canada for future generations to enjoy.

In the workplace Noffke was depicted as a very authoritarian individual and a perfectionist, he was often very involved in checking the quality of the construction and the work of the trades on his buildings. Nevertheless, he was very rewarding to the employees who took care in their assignments and did their jobs well. In his personal life, Noffke married Ida Jordan in 1904, at the age of 27, and together they had one son by the name of Wilfred Edgar Noffke who grew up to become an interior designer and contributed to a few projects of his fathers. As the Noffke family matured they lived in multiple homes designed by Noffke himself and even a family cottage that he designed on a lake north of Buckingham. Noffke owned the lake that he built his family cottage on, and he filled it with rainbow trout. He chose to name the lake, Lake Eda, after the nickname that everyone referred to his wife as. Although he was a hardworking and well-established architect in the city, he always had time for his family and time to take part in hobbies such as hunting and fishing, which drove him to join the Laurentian, Ottawa Hunt and Golf Club.

== Styles ==
=== Spanish Colonial Revival ===
Noffke was drawn to this style of architecture and used it very frequently on some of the residential buildings he was commissioned to build. Early in his career, Noffke took a trip to California where he learned to fall in love with this Mediterranean style. Noffke was drawn to the charm and romance associated with the style, the revival is known for its stark stucco exterior walls and warm red or orange tiled roofing. Upon his return, Noffke implemented Spanish Colonial aspects such as the Spanish colonettes, tall chimneys and small semi-enclosed porches to his projects. He adopted these characteristics to his residences for L.W. Crannell and F.X. Plaunt while he worked on the Clemow development in the current day Glebe.

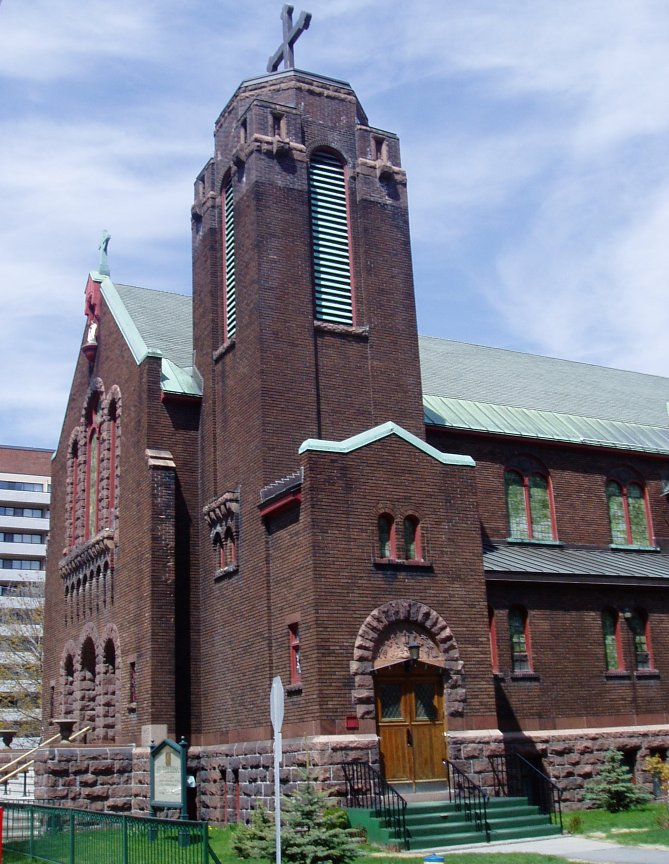
Noffke, St. Theresa's Catholic Church, 1944

=== Neoclassical ===
Many different buildings of Noffke's from his churches, his residential to his commercial included Neoclassical references. Often a cornice would be added or references to columns would be included in his build. Some apartment designs make references to a tympanum over the entrance using their front plaque or a large glass window. His most noticeably Neoclassical build would be the Bank of Ottawa. It has now been changed and taken over by Scotiabank but when Noffke first designed the building it was built with a temple-front façade with engaged iconic columns and a large pediment. Another early build that had classical motifs was the Charles Ogilvy's Building with a cornice around the roof and Greek key-motif spandrel panels as an ornament around the structure. As his career continued the structures with classical motifs were more modern in design but still contained basic forms from the classical vocabulary such as all of his buildings designed for the Department of Mines & Resources Complex.

=== Gothic Revival ===
Gothic style has always been most popular in church designs. Noffke is one of many to adopt this style to his religious projects. Typically, Noffke adopts the buttressing on the sides of the nave, he includes large stained glass windows in lancet and pointed arch styles. Noffke has designed many of these Gothic revival churches all over Ontario. You can find one of his Lutheran Churches in Toronto at Trinity Evangelical Church and St. John's Lutheran Church in Pembroke. Noffke used Gothic influences in many of these church designs up until 1950 when he replaced the influence with a more contemporary point of view. Noffke has also incorporated some of these gothic elements in some of his residential structures such as the F.W.C Mohr Residence which emphasizes light in the same respect as the typical gothic structure.

=== Georgian Revival ===
Georgian Revival a very popular style of Canadian homes in the 19th century, the style was most commonly used in the residential builds of the new nation. As Noffke grew up in this era, the Georgian style was sure to appear in his own architecture. Just like the century before, Noffke used the Georgian Revival style in his residential architecture. Some of the most prominent projects he used the style on are the Goldberg Residence, the H. Plant Residence and his third family home on Harmer Ave. In his Georgian homes, he uses the typical deep red brick on the exterior of the residence, classical features and symmetrical façades.

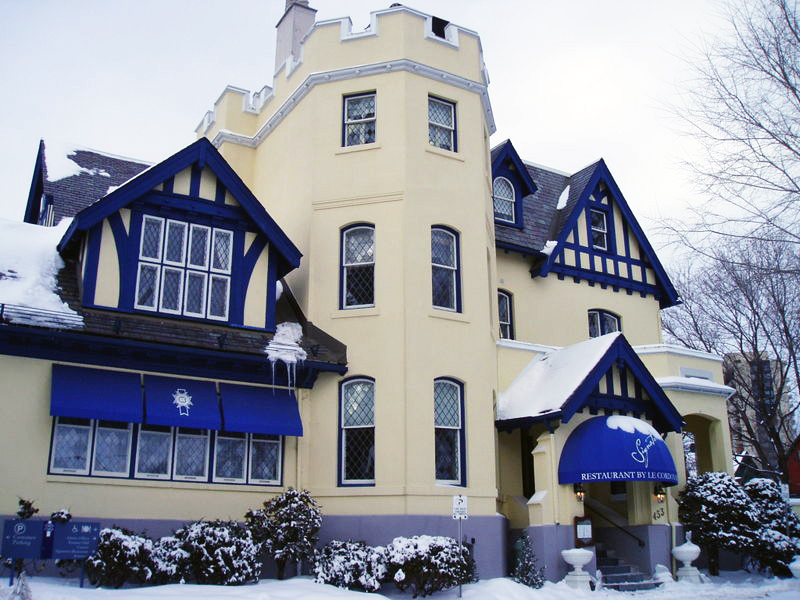
Noffke, J. Ambrose O'Brien's Residence, 1928

=== Tudor Revival ===
The revival of the Tudor style was very popular in the 20th century during the time Noffke was producing designs, the style imitates architectural details used in rural English cottages. Common features in the Tudor style used by Noffke included vertical wood framing backed by stucco walls in contrast to earth tones throughout the rest of the structures. Noffke used the Tudor Revival style on several residential projects such as J. Ambrose O’Brien's Residence. But also, on the Chapel of Hulse Bros. Funeral Home. Many families in the Centertown neighbourhood were Anglophones, therefore introducing this building style to one of the facilities was to evoke a sense of home away from home. Using the Tudor style in the Ottawa area was Noffke's way of connecting with the neighbourhood and making immigrants feel welcome and familiar in this new and developing country.

=== Art Deco ===
Art Deco is known to be a style of bold geometric shapes and decorative features that mimic more exotic styles. It can be considered a more modern style as it has often been used for many building structures that were new to the 20th century, such as skyscrapers. Even before Art Deco was of style it was said that Noffke design for the Entrance and Ticket Office of the CCEA in 1914 share some of these decorative ideas. Noffke returns to these aspects when Art Deco becomes more popular in the architectural world. He uses these geometric shapes in the structure and ornamentation as well as references to the Egyptian ziggurats. This style appears in many of his most popular structures in the downtown Ottawa core including the Medical Arts Building and the Central Post Office. He also adopts the style to some of his residential designs including the Mohr Residence now used as an Embassy.

=== Modernism Shift/International Style ===
When Noffke swapped out the Gothic influence in his church projects he replaced it with a more contemporary approach. This included the international style, he made this most evident in his work on Our Saviour Lutheran Church, where he uses the same geometric massing as the popular style of the century. The church also has a patterned screen instead of stained-glass windows to make the building cheaper and more modern. Crane Ltd. Warehouse is an example of an industrial project that Noffke worked on in a more contemporary style with its large glass walls and severe geometric shape. Noffke became interested in the modern movement when he went on his trip to California while visiting he interacted with a number of buildings by Irving Gill and borrowed his horizontal massing and clean lines for his design on the C.W. Bangs Residence.

== Associations ==
=== Northwood ===
Northwood was the firm individual to partner with Noffke after the development of Noffke's own firm in 1901. Northwood joined Noffke the following year for a brief period of time. Together the two worked on the Fat Stock Building (1905) and the Bank of Ottawa (1906) in the city of Ottawa. In 1905 Northwood took off to Winnipeg where he worked alongside Noffke and one other individual, in this arrangement they managed clients in both cities with Noffke staying back in Ottawa and the other two working in Winnipeg together, this collaboration lasted only a year before Northwood was quick to move on to new opportunities. Northwood joined partnership with a few other individuals in Winnipeg for the next 10 or so years. In 1915 Northwood enlisted in WW1 efforts and was sent overseas. During his time in battle, he was captured as a prisoner of war by the Germans for three years. Following this horrific incident, he was released and returned home where he continued to practice architecture back in Winnipeg.

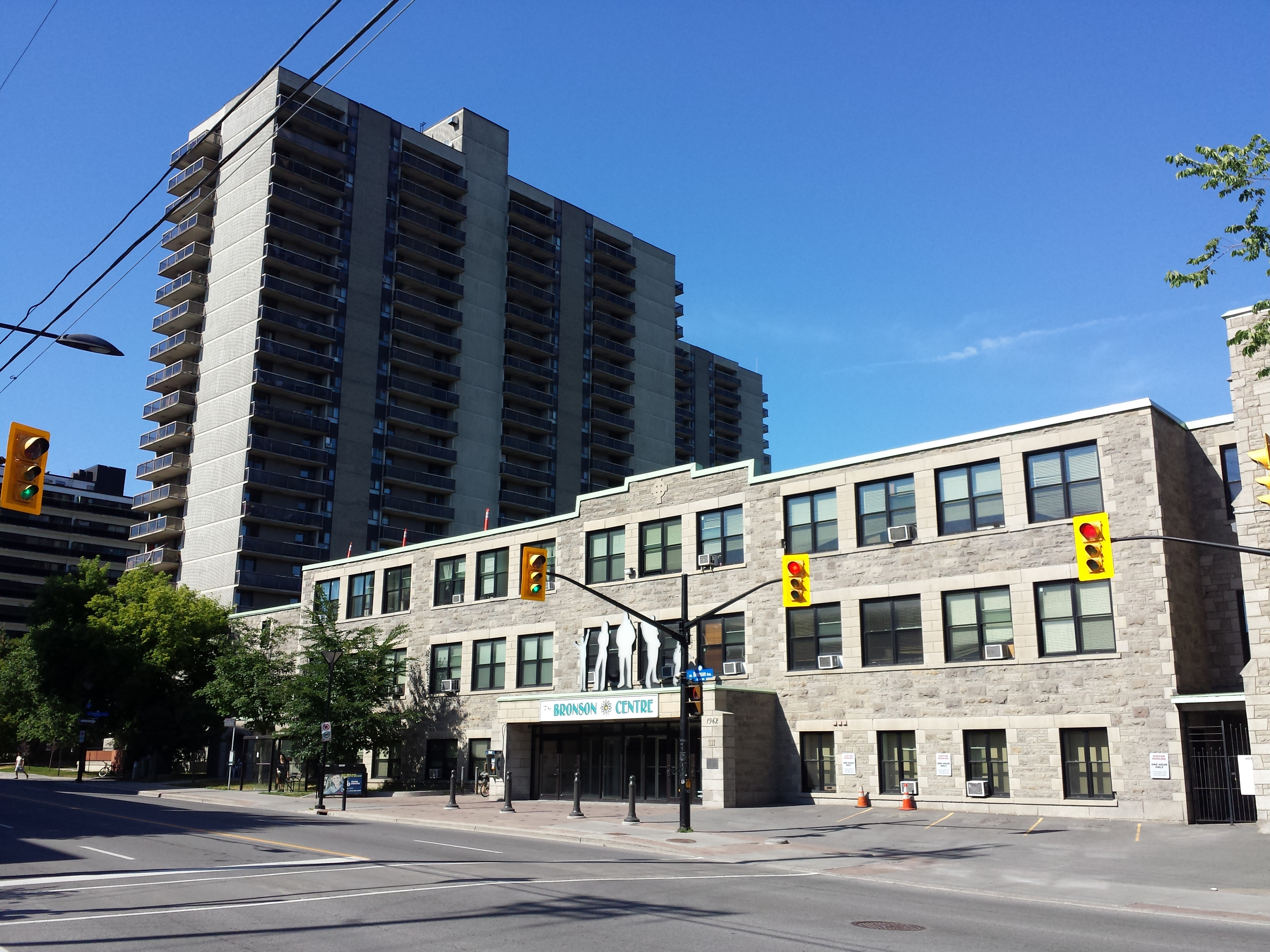
Noffke, Immaculata High School, 1929

=== Morin and Sylvester ===
Noffke worked solo for a few years between his partnership with Northwood, in 1922 he was joined by Morin and Sylvester. [8] Together the three partners worked on building projects such as the Ottawa General Hospital (1927) and Immaculata High School (1929) along with many others. Just 10 years following the start of the partnership Morin was dropped from the firm. Due to a lack of business, Morin was let go and started his own firm after changing his name to Moran, he worked closely with Fred Taylor for a few years before deciding to work on his own.

=== Sylvester ===
Before the initial partnership with Noffke, Morin and Sylvester. Sylvester worked under Noffke between the years of 1909-1914 as a junior draftsman. This time spent with the architect allowed him to score the opportunity to work in a partnership when he finished his training and became a full-time architect himself. After Morin was let go from the partnership Noffke and Sylvester continued to work together until 1935, at this time Sylvester decided to go off on his own and make a name for himself individually.

=== Ingram ===
Just like many other partners before him, Ingram worked as a draughtsman in the office of Noffke. Succeeding this experience, he officially partnered with Noffke in 1954, during this term they collaborated on projects such as the reconstruction of the Embassy of the USSR (1956–57) and the renovation of the former Mortimer Building (1957). Noffke retired from the practice in 1961, leaving Ingram to head a mainstream Practice, under the name of Earle Ingram and Associates, that produced well-designed schools, churches, healthcare facilities, and municipal buildings in a contemporary style. His churches were considerably more traditional and cautious, with distinct avoidance of parabolic swoops or dramatic silhouettes characteristic to many churches of that time.

=== Ingram and Pye ===
Ingram practices on his own for 3 years until 1964. Brian Pye joined Earle Ingram to form Ingram and Pye Architects, the firm designed different churches, office buildings, and schools. They are most recognized for their work on Renfrew Presbyterian Church (1965) and Carleton County Jail (1969) they worked together until the retirement of Ingram in 1973. Pye continued the Practice alone until 1977.

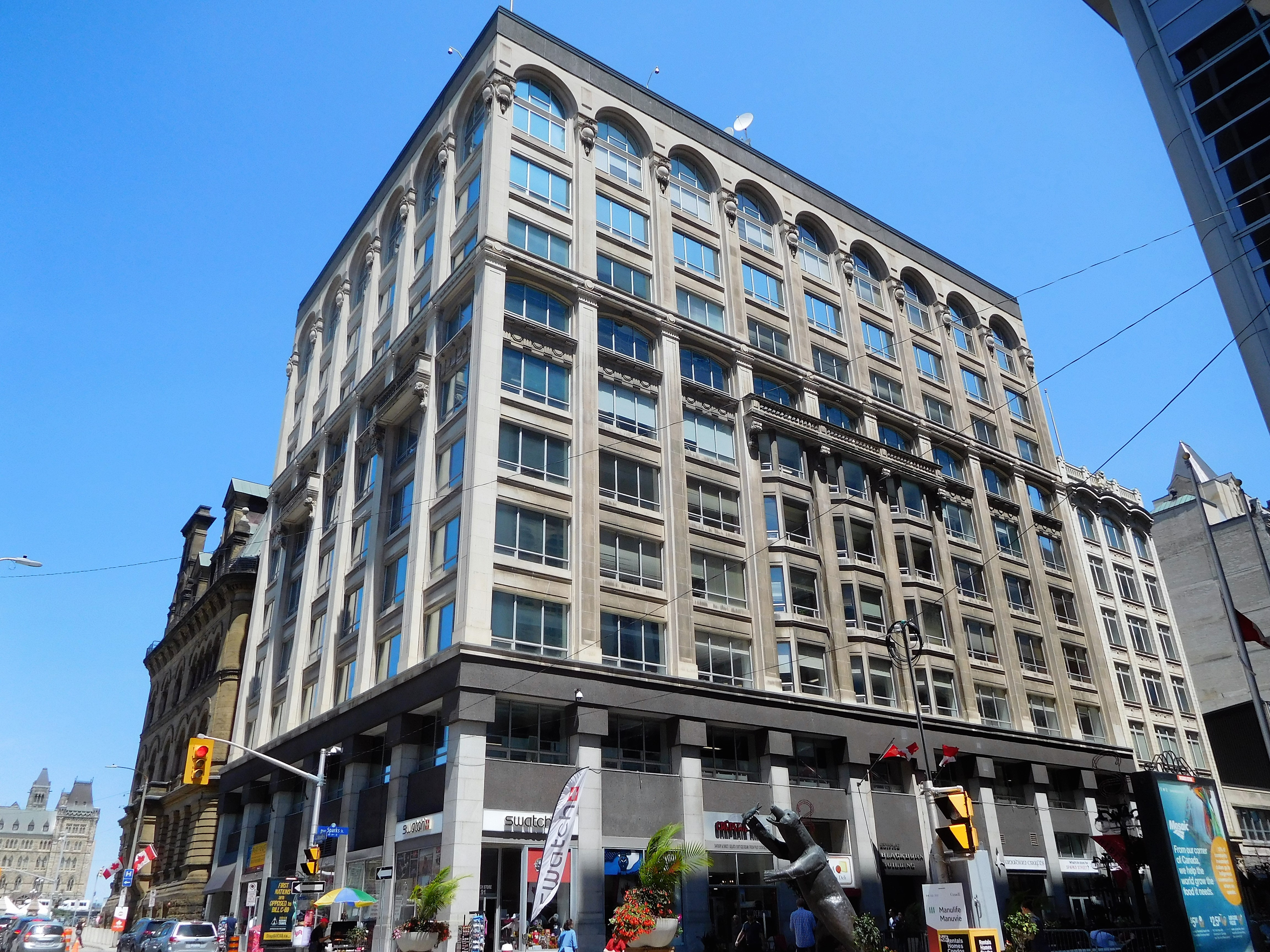
Noffke, Blackburn Building, 1913

=== Pye and Richards ===
Idwal Richards joined the partnership to create Pye and Richards Architects in the year 1977. The firm designed many different buildings types throughout Ottawa and its greater area. The firm provides many architectural services including pre-design programming, space planning, building design, project management, and interior design. Pye and Richards just like their predecessors work with clients for public and private spaces, and institutions, in addition, they work with the federal, and provincial governments. Pye continued to practice with Richards until 1994 when he chose to retire. The firm continued under this name until 2019 when it was merged with its most recent partner.

=== Pye and Richards - Temprano and Young Architects ===
In 2019 the Pye and Richards were joined with Temprano & Young when Eliseo Temprano created the partnership. The firm today operated under the name Pye & Richards - Temprano & Young (PR-TY), continuing the legacy of the 120-year-old lineage. Currently, PR-TY has a very large scope of projects from commercial to residential with some of their most major ongoing projects in the religious sector and with the school board. One of the goals of the current firm is to bring more awareness to the long history of the firm and how its predecessor firms shaped the Ottawa community and other locations around Ontario. The firm looks towards the future development of the profession and upcoming trends in historical recognition, they have directed a large focus onto their online presence and making the collection of data from the past firms available to the public to further educate and understand its importance.

== Selected works ==
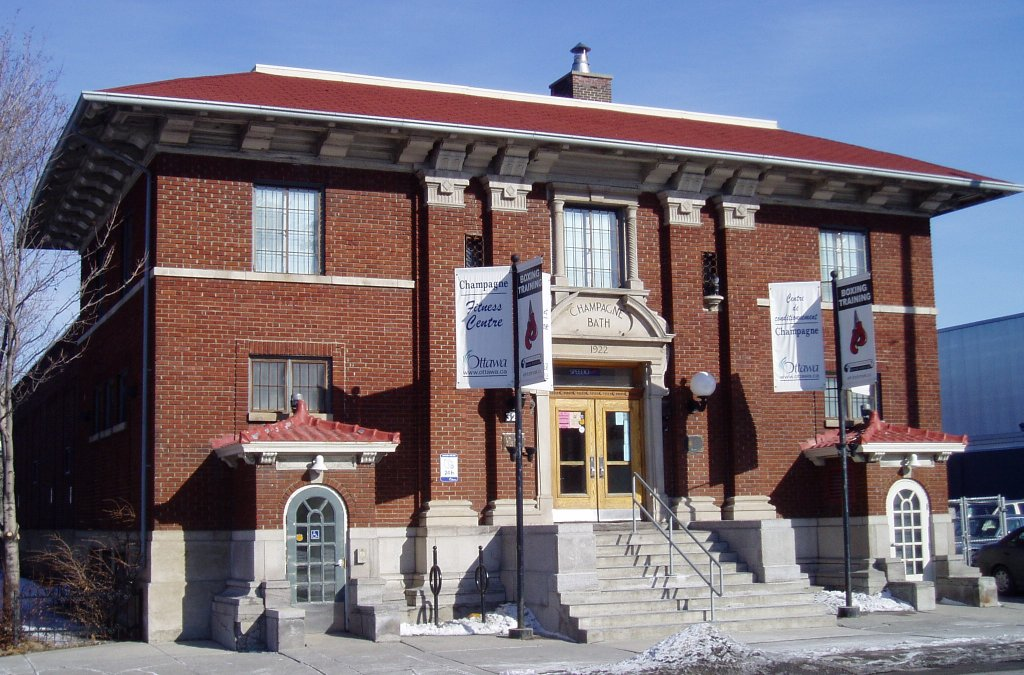
Noffke, Champagne Bath, 1922

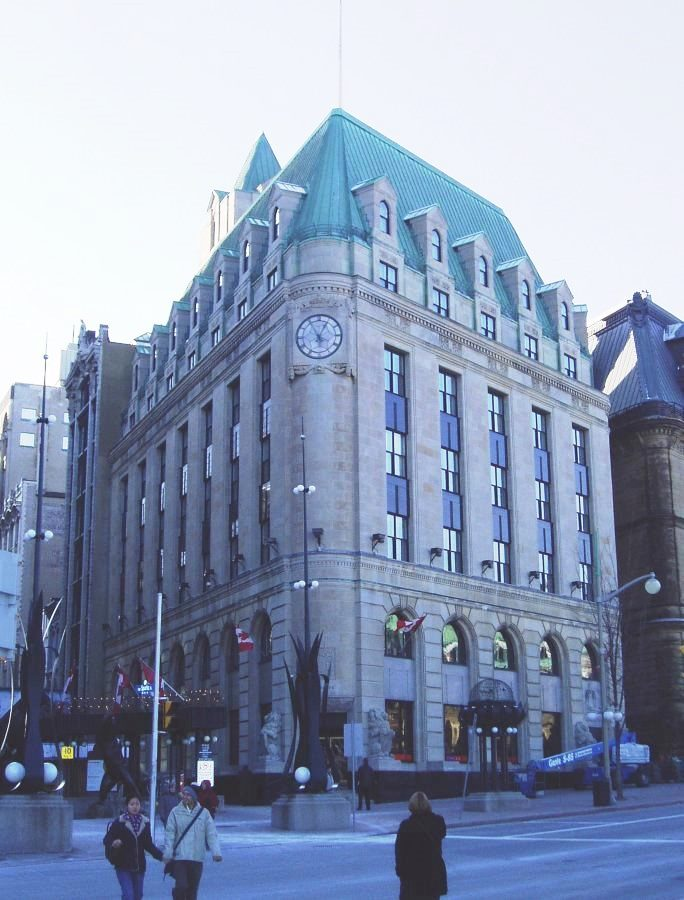
Noffke, Central Post Office, 1948

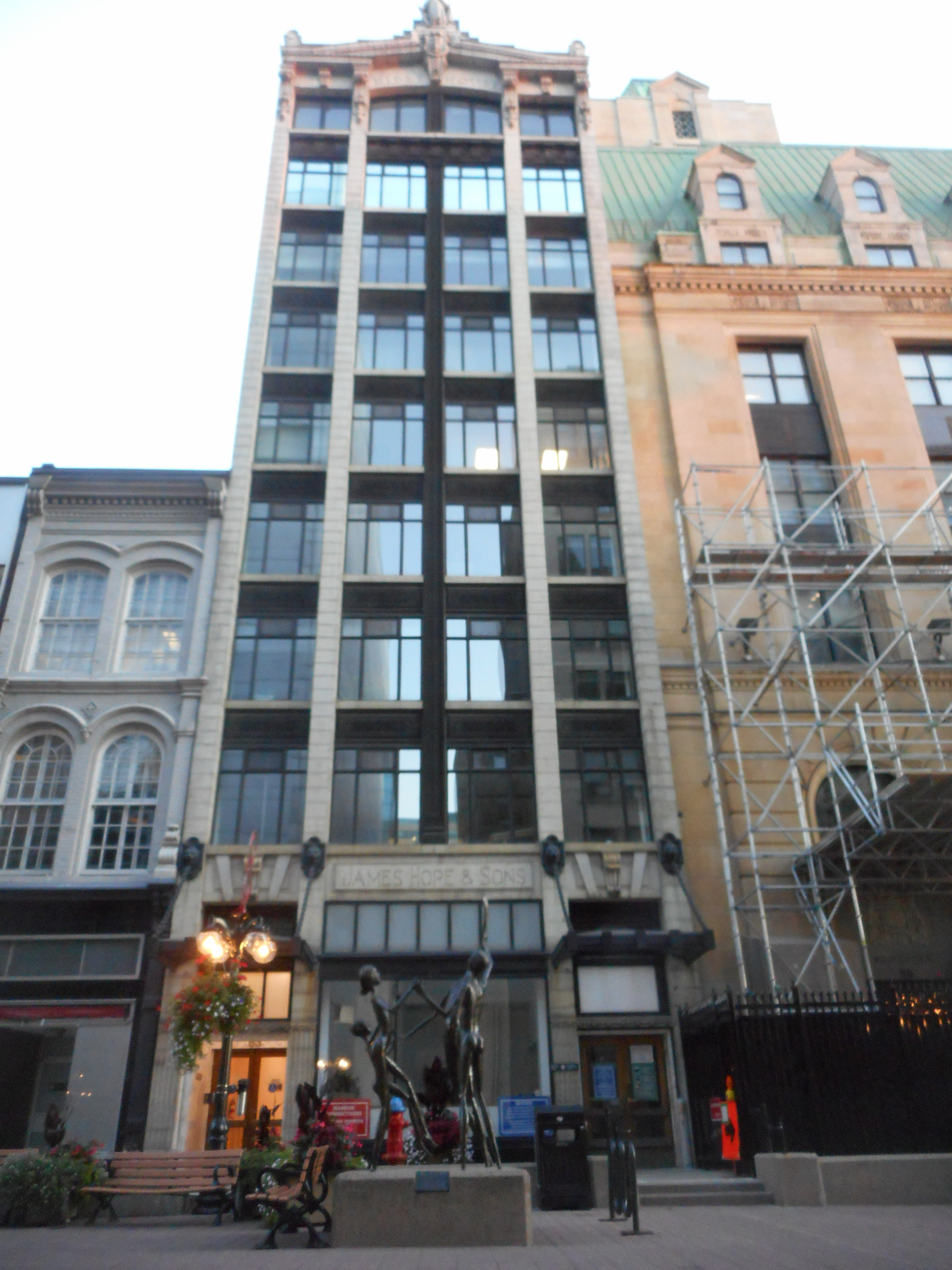
Noffke, Hope Building, 1910

- Bank of Ottawa, Ottawa, 1906
- Charles Ogilvy LTD., Ottawa, 1907
- J.J Cadville Residence, Ottawa, 1907
- CCEA Grandstand, Ottawa, 1909
- Hope Building, Ottawa, 1910
- Clemow Development, Ottawa, early 20th c.
- Hayden House, Ottawa, 1910
- W.F. Powell House, Ottawa, 1913
- Plaza Building, Ottawa, 1913
- Blackburn Building, Ottawa, 1913
- W.E. Noffke House, Ottawa, 1913
- St. Lucas Evangelical Lutheran Church, Ottawa, 1914
- Iona Mansions, Ottawa, 1914
- Vimy Apartments, Ottawa, 1919
- Fire Hall No. 10, Ottawa, 1920
- The Street House, Ottawa, 1920
- St. Anne's Rectory, Myrand Avenue, Ottawa, 1921
- Champagne Public Baths, Ottawa, 1922
- Kert Apartments, Ottawa, 1927
- C.R. Bangs House, Ottawa, 1927
- Ottawa General Hospital, Ottawa, 1927
- Medical Arts Building, Ottawa, 1928
- F.W.G. Mohr Residence, Ottawa, 1928
- Ambassador Court Apartments, Ottawa, 1928
- J. Ambrose O'Brien Residence, Currently Le Cordon Bleu, Ottawa, 1928,
- S.F. Kirkpatrick Residence, Ottawa, 1929
- O' Brien Theatre, Renfrew, 1929
- W.F. Powell House, Ottawa, 1929
- Immaculata High School, Ottawa, 1929
- Ambrose O'Brien Country Residence: Meech Lake, Chelsea Quebec, 1929
- St. John Evangelical Lutheran Church, Toronto, 1930
- G. Bates Residence, Ottawa, 1930
- St. Theresa Roman Catholic Church, Ottawa, 1930
- Christ the King Church and School, Ottawa, 1930
- Department of Mines Building Complex, Ottawa, 1930 s
- Chapel for Hulse Bros. Funeral Home, Ottawa, 1932
- Epstein Apartments, Ottawa, 1933
- Royal York Apartments, Ottawa, 1935
- Redeemer Lutheran Chapel, North Bay, 1935
- Central Post Office, Ottawa, 1938
- St. Jean Baptist Roman Catholic Church, Pembroke, 1941
- Trinity Evangelical Lutheran Church, Toronto, 1944
- Salon d'Or at Chez Henri Hotel, Gatineau, 1947
- No. 5 Rideau Gate, Ottawa, 1947
- Trinity Evangelical Lutheran Church, London, 1949
- Our Saviour Lutheran Church, Ottawa, 1954
- Standish Hall Hotel, Gatineau, 1954
- USSR Embassy, Ottawa, 1956
- Mount Calvary Lutheran Church, Ottawa, 1957
