= Central Post Office (Ottawa) =

Building in Ontario, Canada

Coordinates: 45.423494°N 75.696353°W

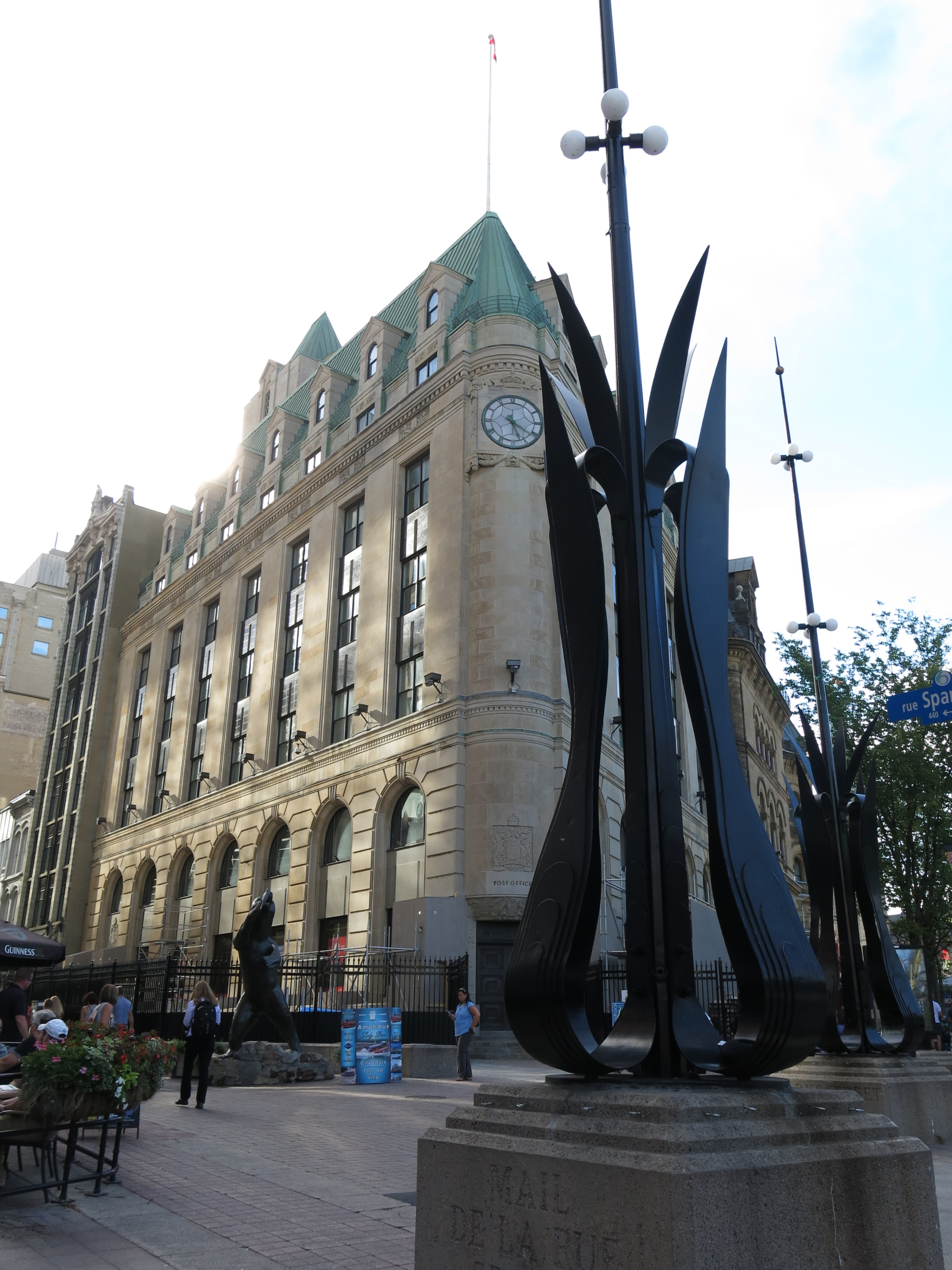
The Central Post Office

The Central Post Office is a historic building in Ottawa, Ontario, Canada. The building was completed in 1939, replacing a Second Empire style office built in 1876. This original office was located in what is today Confederation Square, and was demolished in order to construct the grand public space. The new office was designed by W.E. Noffke, it is located on the western edge of the square at the end of Sparks Street. The new site required the demolition of the Royal Bank of Canada building (built originally for James Hope and Company). The office combines the distinctly Canadian Chateauesque style with Art Deco elements. It is noted for the decorative carved lions arranged around its base.

The Central Post Office is currently home to offices for the Privy Council of Canada, with a Canada Post post office on the main floor.
