= St. Theresa's Catholic Church (Ottawa) =

Church in Ottawa, Canada

Coordinates: 45.419032°N 75.688205°W

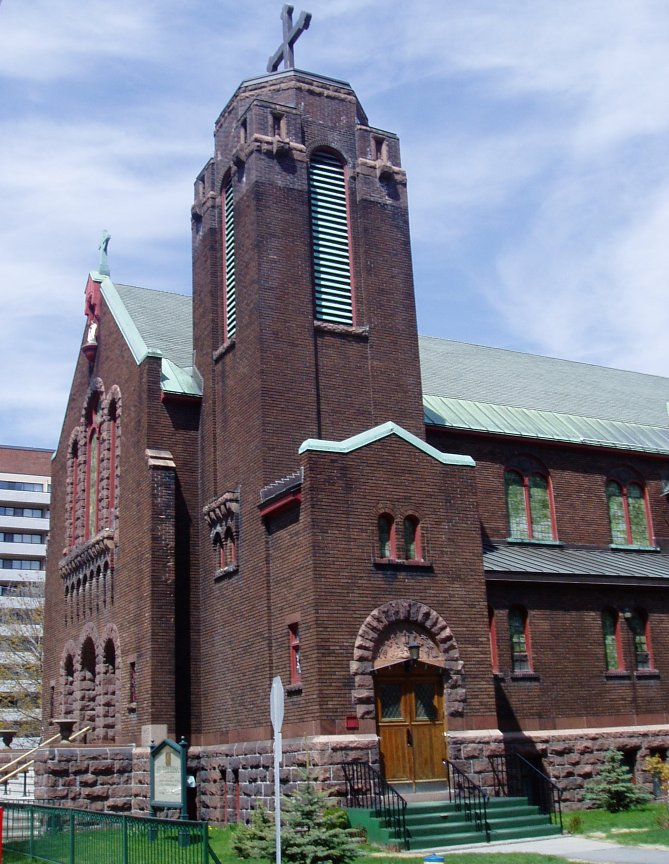
- St. Theresa's Catholic Church in Downtown Ottawa
- St. Theresa's Catholic Church (Ottawa)
- Denomination: Roman Catholic

Administration
- Province: Canada
- Diocese: Roman Catholic Archdiocese of Ottawa
- Parish: Ontario

St. Theresa's Catholic Church is a Roman Catholic church on Cartier Street in Ottawa, Ontario, Canada. The church is located in the eastern section of downtown Ottawa, on Somerset Street between Elgin Street and the Rideau Canal.

== History ==
The parish was founded in 1929, split off from St. Patrick's parish, which had covered all of Centretown. The Romanesque Revival church building was completed in 1933 designed by noted Ottawa architects W.E. Noffke, Sylvester and Morin.
