= Immaculata High School (Ottawa) =

Location
- 140 Main Street; Ottawa, Ontario, K1S 5P4; Canada; 45.410323°N 75.680523°W

Information
- School type: Public, separate high school
- Motto: Study Builds Character
- Religious affiliation: Catholic
- Founded: 1928
- School board: Ottawa Catholic School Board
- Superintendent: Sean Kelly
- Area trustee: Luka Luketic-Buyers
- Principal: Linda Meulenbroek
- Grades: 7–12
- Enrollment: 985 (September 2018)
- Language: English/French
- Colours: White and Navy Blue
- Mascot: Bernie Mac, a St. Bernard
- Team name: Saints
- Website: imh.ocsb.ca

Immaculata High School is a Roman Catholic high school in Ottawa, Ontario, Canada, operated by the Ottawa Catholic School Board. It is currently located along the Rideau Canal in Old Ottawa East neighbourhood of Ottawa. Like other Catholic schools, it is publicly funded under the Ontario school system.

== History ==
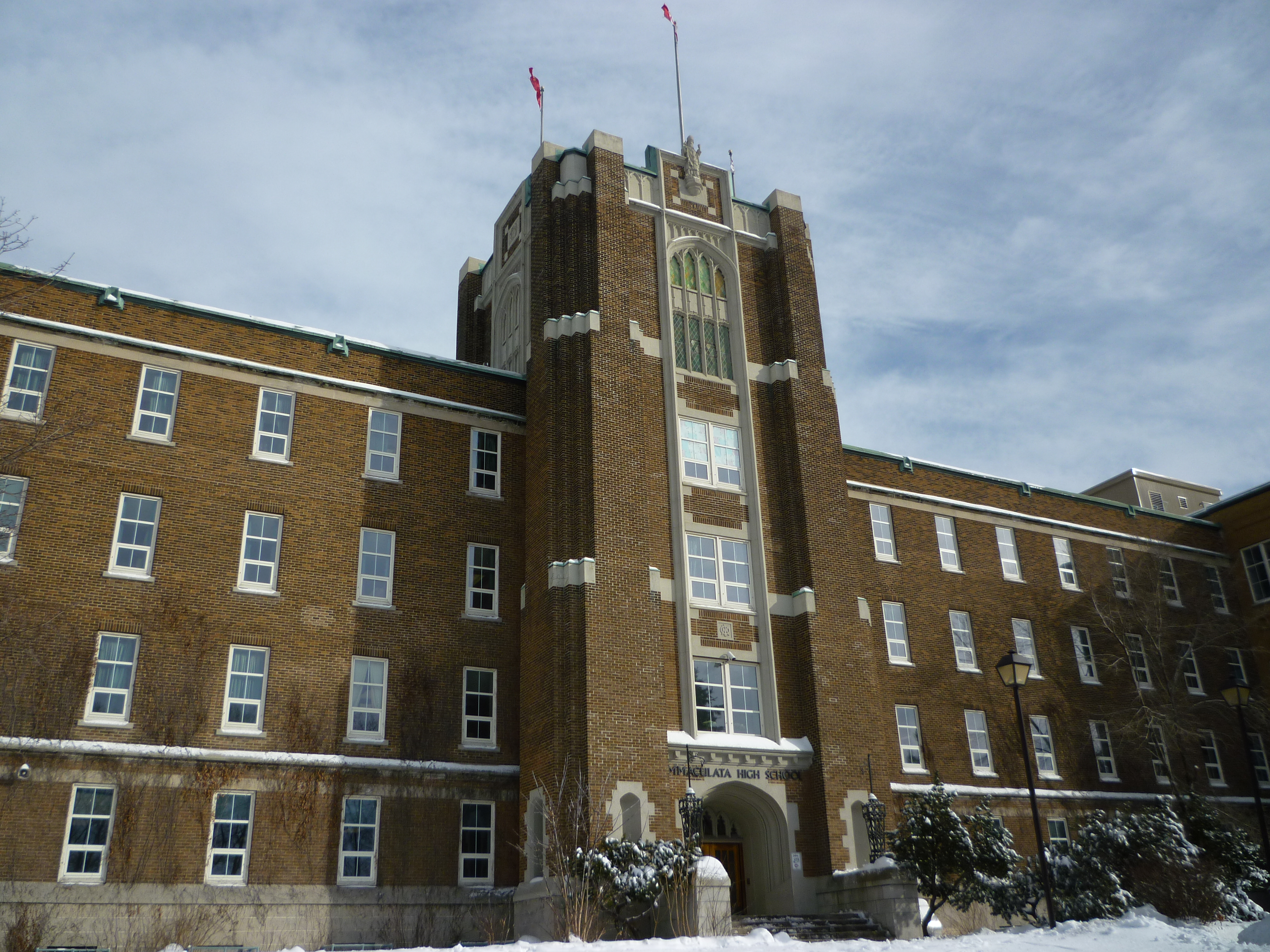
Immaculata High School

Immaculata High School was founded as an all-girls school in 1928 by Reverend J.J. O'Gorman, acting under the advice of higher ecclesiastical authority. He named the school "Immaculata", and opened it with an initial enrollment of 85 run by a staff of 3 Grey Sisters as an alternative to public school education for girls of moderate income located at 211 Bronson Avenue. The girls paid a monthly fee of one dollar — if their families could afford it. The site for the new school was the former Christie mansion property on Bronson Avenue at the corner of Lisgar Street, which was purchased for $25,000. W.E. Noffke, a well-known Ottawa architect, designed the school with eight classrooms, a science lab, a home economics classroom, a gymnasium and a stage area, and office space. A passageway linked the school to the former Christie mansion, which became the first convent home for the Grey Sisters who taught at the school. During the construction of the school building, the students of the newly formed Immaculata High School attended classes at St. Patrick’s Home, at the corner of Laurier Avenue and Kent Street. Sister Loyola was the first principal and the teachers were Sister Agnes of the Sacred Heart and Sister St. Geraldine.

By 1929, enrollment had increased to 160 students, and a new building with five classrooms, a science lab and a small library was constructed. In 1929, the first commencement was held and a music department was established. In 1930, enrollment was 200 students and a commercial course was provided.

A home economics department and nine new classrooms were added in 1939 to meet the needs of the enrollment of 300 students, taught by nine Sisters.

In 1941, Principal Sister Mary Christine supervised a staff of 11. To meet the needs of the camera club, developing facilities and printing rooms were added. In 1948, the enrolment at Immaculata was 425, and the staff now consisted of 17 Sisters.

The school's Dr. B. Kearns Memorial Wing, which opened in September 1950, added eight classrooms, including a double-sized commercial classroom and space for the Music Department. In 1952, an addition to the Kearns Memorial Wing added three new classrooms, a students' library and a principal's office.

In 1954, a new convent was constructed on the north side of the property. The former convent was renovated into 2 classrooms and space for the Music Department, which had a staff of 4. The enrollment was 725 students and the school now had a staff of 22.

In 1962, a chapel/auditorium was built, a project led by principal Sister Mary Christine. In 1967, another building was constructed with 12 classrooms, labs and a gym. Despite this, however, by 1972 the enrollment of Immaculata had dropped to 400 students.

As Immaculata celebrated its golden anniversary in 1978, male students were enrolled for the first time. In 1984, grades 7 and 8 students were added. When Immaculata marked its 60th anniversary in 1988, James J. Shea was appointed as the school's first lay principal, overseeing an enrollment of 870 students.

After Immaculata celebrated its 65th anniversary in September 1994 (after 2 years of major renovations), the school moved to the current location at 140 Main Street. It has been declared an arts academy.

The high school's current location was originally built in 1929–1930 to house both St. Patrick's High School and St. Patrick's College (Ottawa), a now defunct Catholic post-secondary institution administered by the Oblate Fathers. In 1973, St. Patrick's sold the building to Algonquin College, who operated a satellite campus there until it sold the building to the Ottawa Roman Catholic Separate School Board to house Immaculata in 1994. Edward Cuhaci was the architect for the renovations undertaken in 1994.

In 2000, a satellite classroom site for Immaculata High School was set up in the basement of St. Mary's Home, to enable an initial enrollment of 10 pregnant teenagers from all schools in the city to continue with their academics during their pregnancies. The school held its first graduation in June 2000. In January 2002, the program, now called St. Mary's Home Community Outreach, moved into 780 rue de l'Eglise.

Immaculata High School celebrated its 75th anniversary in 2003. In 2007, Principal Thomas D'Amico was named one of Canada's Outstanding Principals. The school's sports team is the Immaculata Saints, and the school mascot is the saint bernard 'Bernie Mac'.

== Principals ==
All of the Sisters who were principals were Grey Sisters of the Immaculate Conception:

- Sister Loyola (1928) (while students attended classes at St. Patrick's Home)
- Sister Agnes of the Sacred Heart (1928–1935) (first principal at Bronson Avenue site)
- Sister Patrice Thompson (1935–1937)
- Sister Darina Fackelman (1937–1941)
- Sister Thomas Tremblay (1941–54)
- Sister Cormickie Holland (1954–1967)
- Sister Lucille Martin (1967–70)
- Sister Anna Clare (1970–75 and 1976–82)
- Sister Anne O’Brien (1975–76)
- Sister Theresa Kelly (1982–87)
- James J. Shea (1987–89)
- Mary Durst (1989–95)
- Evelyn Kelly (1989 (acting) and 1995–1999)
- Bernard Swords (1999–2002)
- Denise Andre (2002–03)
- Thomas D'Amico (2003–2010)
- Christopher Mes (2010–2016)
- Norma Mcdonald (2016–2018)
- Sean Power (2018–2021)
- Robert Garnett (2021–2026)
- Linda Meulenbroek (2026–present)

== Notable alumni ==
- David Azzi, former CFL football player
- Ben Eager, former NHL hockey player
- Craig Lauzon, comedian, co-starring on Royal Canadian Air Farce
- Lynn Nightingale, figure skating champion
- Andrew Scheer, Canadian Member of Parliament, former Speaker of the House of Commons and former leader of the Conservative Party of Canada
- Julie Van Dusen, reporter for CBC; covers political events
- K Alexander, non-binary actor/YouTuber/musician
- Alanis Morissette, Singer

== See also ==
- Education in Ontario
- List of secondary schools in Ontario
