= High Commission of South Africa, Ottawa =

Diplomatic mission of South Africa to Canada

High Commission of South Africa in Ottawa
- High Commission of South Africa in 2026
- Location: New Edinburgh, Ottawa
- Address: 15 Sussex Drive
- Coordinates: 45.4441°N 75.6925°W
- High Commissioner: Rieaz Shaik

The South African High Commission in Ottawa is the High Commission of South Africa in Ottawa, Ontario, Canada. It is located at 15 Sussex Drive in the New Edinburgh neighbourhood of Ottawa. Directly across the street from the embassy is 24 Sussex Drive the official residence of the Prime Minister of Canada. East of the High Commission is 7 Rideau Gate, Canada's official guest house for visiting dignitaries. Rideau Hall, the official residence of the Governor General of Canada is also nearby at 1 Sussex Drive.

The building was constructed for James Stevenson, the Bank of Montreal's representative in Ottawa, in 1841. In 1867, it was purchased by Moss Kent Dickinson an industrialist and mayor of Ottawa and then by the South African government in 1944. Throughout its history the building went through a number of renovations, two additions under the supervision of architect W.E. Noffke in 1920 and 1947 as well as a renovation by Peter John Stokes from 1964 to 1965.

During the apartheid era, the mission was the scene of frequent protests. Following South Africa's withdrawal from the Commonwealth of Nations in 1961, its status changed from High Commission to Embassy, and there was pressure within Canada to end diplomatic relations with the country. With the end of apartheid in 1994, South Africa rejoined the Commonwealth and in April the following year, the first black High Commissioner, Billy Modise, was appointed. A former leader of the African National Congress Youth Wing, Modise spent 31 years in exile after fleeing South Africa in 1960. The current High Commissioner is Rieaz Shaik.

South Africa also has a Consulate General in Toronto.

== Ambassadors (until 31 May 1994) ==
- Glenn Babb 1985–87
- Johannes Hendrik De Klerk 1987–91

== High Commissioners (since 1 June 1994) ==
- Billy Modise
- Rieaz Shaik
- Shepherd Mdladlana (September 2012 to October 2024)

== Related link ==
- Canada-South Africa relations
