= Town Center =

A town center is the commercial or geographical center or core area of a town.

Town Center may also refer to:

- Town Center at Boca Raton, a shopping center in Boca Raton, Palm Beach County, Florida
- Town Center at Cobb, a shopping mall in Kennesaw, Georgia, United States
- Town Center at Corte Madera, a shopping mall in Corte Madera, California
- Town Center Improvement District, a government agency in The Woodlands, Texas
- Town Center One, a high-rise in Dadeland, Miami-Dade County, Florida
- Town Center Park, a small municipal park in Wilsonville, Oregon, United States
- Town Center Plaza, an open-air shopping center in Leawood, Kansas, United States
- Town Center, Columbia, Maryland, a town in Columbia, Maryland, United States
- Alabang Town Center, a shopping mall in Muntinlupa, Metro Manila, Philippines
- Ballymun Shopping Centre, a demolished shopping centre in Ballymun, Dublin, Ireland
- Botany Town Centre, a 200-shop complex with non-joined malls in Auckland, New Zealand
- Charleston Town Center, a shopping mall in Charleston, West Virginia, United States
- Clackamas Town Center, a shopping mall in Clackamas County, Oregon, United States
- Mershops Town Center at Aurora, a shopping mall in Aurora, Colorado, United States
- New Town Center (Maryland), a planned urban center in Hyattsville, Maryland, United States
- Odenton Town Center, an area of Odenton, Maryland, United States
- Peninsula Town Center, an open air mixed-use development in Hampton, Virginia
- Reston Town Center, a mixed-use development in Reston, Virginia, United States
- Santa Maria Town Center, a shopping mall in Santa Maria, California, United States
- Southfield Town Center, a skyscraper complex in Southfield, Michigan, United States
- Sunnyvale Town Center, a former shopping mall in Sunnyvale, California, United States
- Virginia Beach Town Center, a group of offices, hotels, stores, and restaurants in Virginia Beach, Virginia
- Winrock Town Center, an open air mixed-use development under construction in Albuquerque, New Mexico

== See also ==
- Town Centre (disambiguation)
- Town Center Mall (disambiguation)
