= Centertown =

Centertown, Center Town, Centretown, or Centre Town may refer to:

- Centertown, Tennessee, U.S.
- Centertown, Missouri, U.S.
- Centertown, Kentucky, U.S.
- Centretown, a downtown neighbourhood in Ottawa, Ontario, Canada
- Centretown West, a neighbourhood in Ottawa, Ontario, Canada

== Other uses ==
- Centretown News, a newspaper published by Carleton University, Ottawa, Ontario, Canada

== See also ==
- Centre Township (disambiguation)
- Town Center (disambiguation)
