= Town Center Mall =

Town Center Mall may refer to:

- Town Center at Boca Raton, shopping mall in Boca Raton, Florida
- Town Center at Cobb, shopping mall in Kennesaw, Georgia
- Town Center at Corte Madera, shopping mall in Corte Madera, California
- Town Center Mall, former shopping mall in Rock Hill, South Carolina
- Mershops Town Center at Aurora, shopping mall in Aurora, Colorado (formerly known as Aurora Mall and Town Center at Aurora)
- Sunnyvale Town Center, former shopping mall in Sunnyvale, California
- Santa Maria Town Center, shopping mall in Santa Maria, California
- Stamford Town Center, shopping mall in Stamford, Connecticut

== See also ==
- Town centre
