= Redwood High School (Larkspur, California) =

Location
- 395 Doherty Drive; Larkspur, California; United States; 37°56′17″N 122°31′27″W

Information
- Type: Public school
- Established: 1958
- School district: Tamalpais Union High School District
- School code: CEEB 051361
- Principal: Lisa Kemp
- Grades: 9–12
- Enrollment: 1,801 (2023-24)
  - Grade 9: 432
  - Grade 10: 461
  - Grade 11: 432
  - Grade 12: 476
- Campus: Suburban
- Colors: Red & Grey
- Athletics conference: North Coast Section (NCS), Marin County Athletic League (MCAL)
- Mascot: "Big Red" (Giant)
- Team name: Giants
- Rival: Marin Catholic High School
- Newspaper: Redwood Bark
- Yearbook: The Log
- Feeder schools: Del Mar Middle School; Hall Middle School; Kent Middle School; Ross Middle School
- Website: redwood.tamdistrict.org

Redwood High School is a public secondary school located in the city of Larkspur, California, United States, approximately 12 miles (19 km) north of San Francisco. Redwood High is part of the Tamalpais Union High School District (TUHSD). The school serves the cities of Belvedere, Corte Madera, Greenbrae, Kentfield, Larkspur, Ross, and Tiburon.

The school houses the TUHSD headquarters.

== History ==
By 1957, the school age population of the Tamalpais Union High School District had grown too large for Tamalpais High School and Archie Williams High School to accommodate. With the pressure of students coming in from elementary schools from Sausalito to Belvedere to Ross, voters chose to create a new school, and chosen for its site was the marshy area that extended east from the centrally located town of Larkspur to U.S. Route 101, an area that townspeople had called "the slough" since Larkspur was settled. The importance of wetlands was not yet widely appreciated (this was the era right before Save the Bay was founded), and the land was seen as "waste." Beginning in early 1957, a large section of the marsh was flattened and filled, two roads were cut through from Magnolia Avenue out to the new school, and school buildings were constructed, along with a playing field and parking lot.

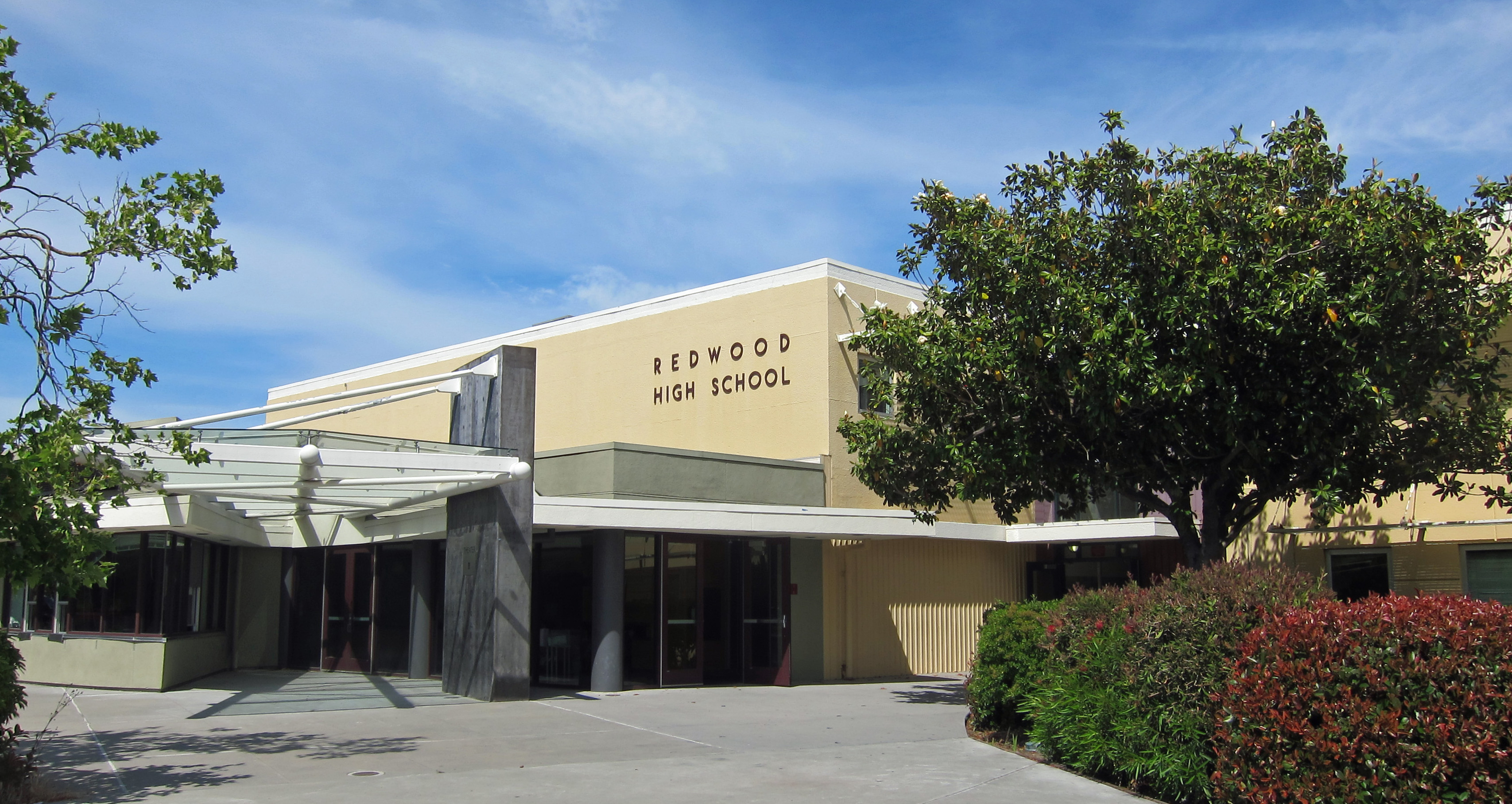
Redwood High School, main entrance

The school opened its doors in 1958. The first students who were to attend the new high school chose the name of the newspaper and sports teams: the Giants became their mascot in reference to the nearby redwood trees. School publications followed the tree theme: the Bark became the school's newspaper, and the Log the school's yearbook. The colors red and gray were a source of much contention, but were finally accepted.

On September 11, 2008, Redwood was recognized by the federal Blue Ribbon Schools Program. The school has received the California Distinguished School award three times (1990, 1996, and 2003).

== Campus ==
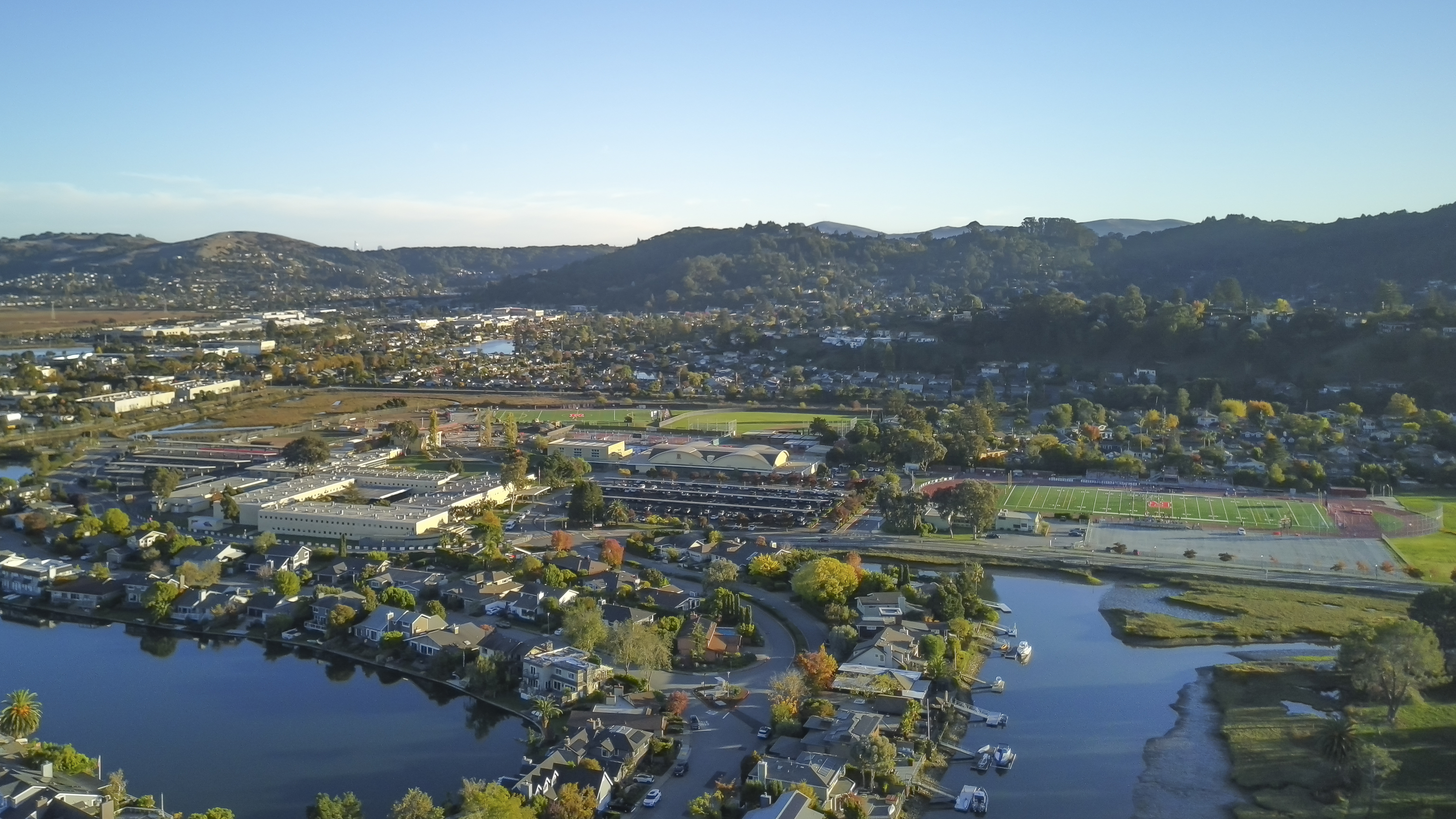
Aerial view of Redwood High School campus

Redwood High School is set at the foot of Mount Tamalpais on a 63.88-acre campus which has 81 classrooms, a library, theater, swimming pool, and athletics fields. The original campus was opened in 1958, with additions to the main building made over the next few years. Redwood's main school building (an original; see above) contains approximately 80 classrooms, the Bessie Chin Library, four labs, and the theater. Other buildings on the campus contain industrial technology areas; photography, ceramics, and graphic arts studios; band room; and a cafeteria. Other sports and performance facilities include a large gymnasium and smaller gym, a 40-meter swimming pool, tennis courts, a track, athletic fields, and an outdoor amphitheater.

Between 2002 and 2006, Redwood High School undertook major modernization as part of a $121 million facilities bond measure approved by the Tam District voters. Approximately $40 million was spent to remodel classrooms, refurbish the gymnasium, tennis courts, and theater, and install new athletics fields. In 2007–2008 Redwood again rebuilt the often flooded parking lot. During the 2008–2009 school year, a new small gymnasium was constructed, the 40-meter pool was built, and new tennis courts laid. During the summer of 2011, an experimental classroom space was created to allow teachers the opportunity to explore new technologies, classroom management, and instructional strategies. In 2026 a Marin County bond measure funded an expansion arts and music building.

In the spring of 2006, Redwood art students created a 40-foot mural of the Marin County countryside. The mural was created on an exterior wall of the cafeteria.

== Operations ==
The Redwood Bark won awards; in 2026 Ara Rosenthal of Wired wrote that it was "one of the most award-winning high school newspapers" in the country.

== Notable alumni ==
- Mike Altman, Olympic rower
- Greg Behrendt, stand-up comedian, author, TV performer
- Buddy Biancalana, shortstop for 1985 World Series champion Kansas City Royals
- William Gagan
- Gunnar Carlsson, professor, Department of Mathematics, Stanford
- Pete Carroll, former head coach of the Las Vegas Raiders, Seattle Seahawks and USC
- Gabrielle Carteris, actress, Beverly Hills, 90210
- Jake Curhan (born 1998), American football offensive tackle for the Seattle Seahawks of the National Football League (NFL)
- Matt Doyle, actor
- David Dukes, film, television, and Tony Award-nominated stage actor
- Steve Fainaru, Pulitzer Prize-winning investigative journalist, co-author of League of Denial
- Mark Fainaru-Wada, investigative journalist, co-author of Game of Shadows
- Gary Fisher, mountain bike innovator, promoter
- Ken Flax (1981), two-time Olympic athlete, holder of NCAA record in the hammer throw
- Don Francis M.D., epidemiologist, pioneer in AIDS and HIV research
- Erin Gray, actress, Silver Spoons
- Cooper Helfet, tight end for Seattle Seahawks
- J. R. Hildebrand, Indycar Series driver and 2011 Indianapolis 500 runner-up
- Peter Horton, actor and director
- Maz Jobrani, Iranian-American comedian
- China Kantner, MTV VJ and actress
- Chad Kreuter, MLB catcher 1988-2003 and USC baseball coach
- Anne Lamott, author
- Richard Laymon, author
- Matthew Leutwyler, producer, director, owner Ambush Entertainment
- John Walker Lindh, the "American Taliban"
- Ki Longfellow, aka Pamela Longfellow, novelist, author of The Secret Magdalene, Flow Down Like Silver, Hypatia of Alexandria
- Andy Luckey, producer of Teenage Mutant Ninja Turtles, Adventures from the Book of Virtues, author and illustrator
- Lon McEachern, host, World Series of Poker (ESPN)
- Gavin Newsom, Governor of California, previously Lieutenant Governor of California and Mayor of San Francisco.
- Ned Overend, cyclist
- Eric Schmitt, Pulitzer Prize-winning journalist, The New York Times
- Tiffany Shlain, founder of Webby Awards
- David Strathairn, Oscar-nominated actor, notable for roles in Sneakers, Good Night, and Good Luck, and Lincoln
- Nicholas Suntzeff, astronomer and cosmologist, Gruber Prize Laureate of 2007 for discovery of dark energy and Accelerating Universe
- Dina Temple-Raston, journalist for Bloomberg News and NPR
- Twinka Thiebaud, writer and model
- Russell Weiner, creator of Rockstar energy drink, son of Michael Savage
- Robin Williams, comedian and Oscar-winning actor
