= Centerton =

Centerton may refer to any of the following locations in the United States:

- Centerton, Arkansas
- Centerton, Indiana
- Centerton, Burlington County, New Jersey
- Centerton, Salem County, New Jersey
- Centerton, Ohio

Elsewhere

- Centerton, Eastern Cape, an area within the town of Hankey, South Africa

Other uses

- Centerton (microprocessor) is an Intel Atom-based x86 microprocessor, marketed as the Atom S1200 series of CPUs

== See also ==
- Centertown (disambiguation)
