= Dina Temple-Raston =

American journalist

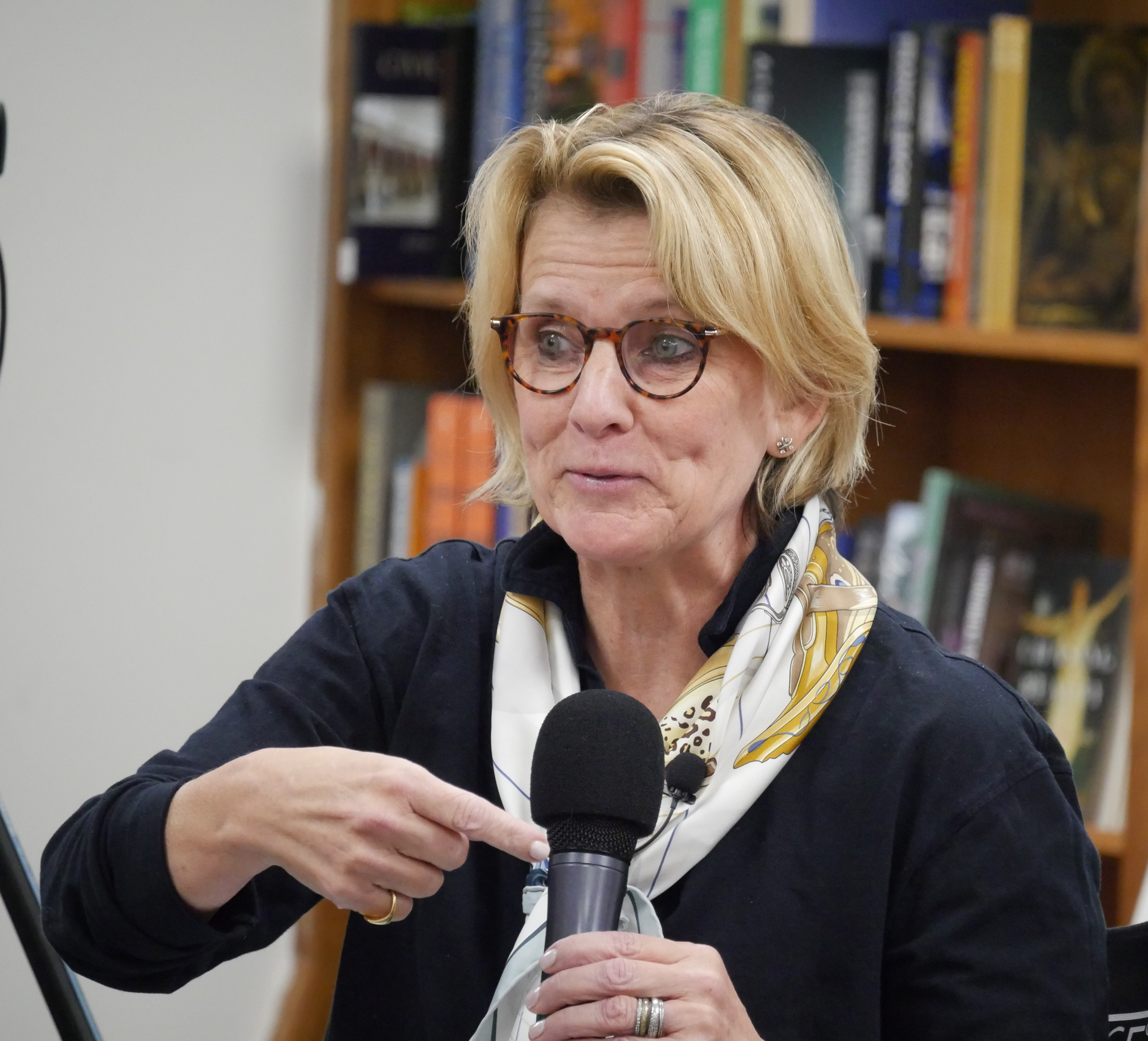
- reading at politics and prose
- Born: 25 August 1965 (age 61); Belgium
- Education: Redwood High School; Northwestern University (BA); Liaoning University; Columbia University
- Occupations: Author; Journalist, Podcaster

Dina Temple-Raston is a Belgian-born American journalist, award-winning author, and public radio show host.

She is the founder, host, and managing editor of the public radio show and three-time Murrow award-winning podcast.

The Click Here radio show, from Recorded Future News and PRX, airs weekly on public radio stations across the nation.

Temple-Raston's work can also be heard on NPR and WAMU's 1A,Marketplace and The World.

She is a former member of NPR's investigative team and was the host and creator of NPR's "I'll Be Seeing You"—a series of radio specials about the technologies that watch us. She also created an Audible podcast called "What Were You Thinking," which looked at how discoveries in neuroscience can begin to explain why adolescents make the decisions they do.

Temple-Raston may be best known as NPR's counter-terrorism correspondent. For more than a decade she reported on terrorism around the world.

She is also the author of four award-winning books including A Death in Texas: A Story of Race, Murder and a Small Town's Struggle for Redemption, about the James Byrd murder in Jasper, Texas; and "The Jihad Next Door: Rough Justice in the Age of Terror," which tracked the lives of six young men who were among the first Americans to try to join al-Qaeda.

== Early life and education ==
Temple-Raston was born in Brussels, Belgium, on 25 August 1964 or 1965. Her first language was French. She graduated from Redwood High School in Larkspur, California, in 1982. She received her Bachelor of Arts with honors from Northwestern University in 1986. She went on to study at Liaoning University, Shenyang, China, graduating with a degree in Chinese Language in 1989. In 2006, she earned a master's degree in journalism from New York's Columbia University.

== Journalistic career ==
In March 2007, she joined the staff of NPR and traveled all over the world covering terrorism attacks and trends. She took a leave in 2017 to create the "What Were You Thinking" podcast, the first season of which was released in 2018. She was chosen for a Nieman Fellowship at Harvard in 2013. These fellowships are given to mid-career journalists. She previously worked as City Hall Bureau Chief for the New York Sun, as a producer for CNNfn and as a White House correspondent for Bloomberg News. One of the news services earliest employees, Temple-Raston was recruited while living in Asia and opened Bloomberg's Shanghai and Hong Kong offices and covered financial markets and economics for both USA Today and CNNfn. She began her professional career as special foreign assistant for the Liaoning Provincial Government, Shenyang, China, followed by a stint with AsiaWeek in Hong Kong.

She left NPR in 2021.

== Bibliography ==
Her first book, A Death in Texas, about the aftermath of a white supremacist murder in a small town, won the Barnes & Noble Discover Great New Writers Program Award and was chosen as one of The Washington Post's Best Books of 2002. Her second work, Justice on the Grass, on the role the radio station Radio Mille Collines played in the 1994 Rwandan genocide, was a Foreign Affairs magazine bestseller. She has written extensively on civil liberties and national security, including In Defense of Our America (co-written with Anthony D. Romero) on civil liberties in post-9/11 America. The Jihad Next Door is her fourth work of nonfiction was published in 2007 and is about the Lackawanna Six, America's first sleeper cell.
