= Larkspur-Corte Madera School District =

School district in California

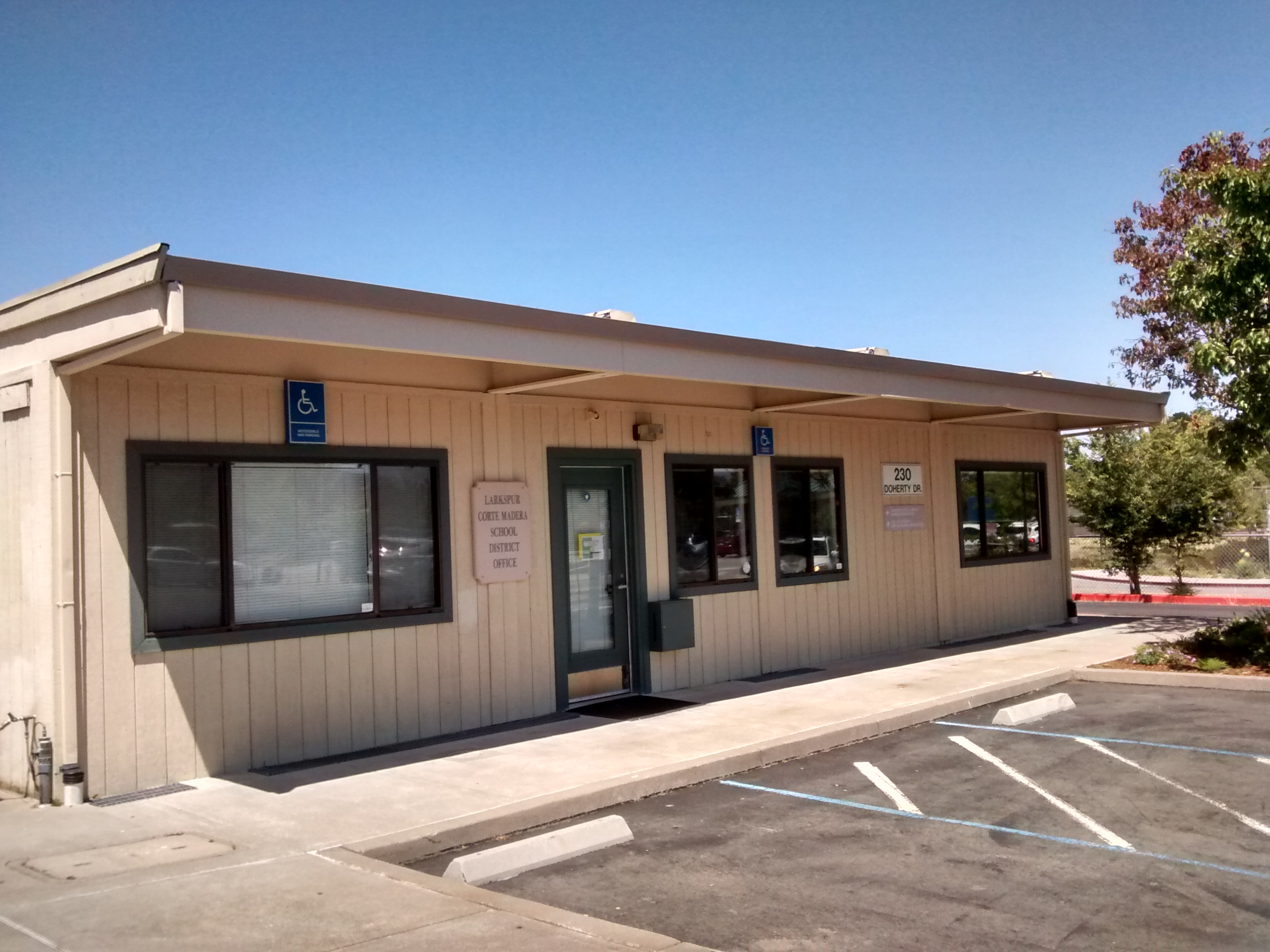
- District office

Address
- 230 Doherty Drive Larkspur, California, 94939; United States

District information
- Type: Public
- Grades: K–8
- Superintendent: Dr. Brett Geithman
- NCES District ID: 0620910

Students and staff
- Students: 1,434 (2020–2021)
- Teachers: 67.42 (FTE)
- Staff: 54.39 (FTE)
- Student–teacher ratio: 21.27:1

Other information
- Website: www.lcmschools.org

Larkspur-Corte Madera School District is a school district headquartered in Larkspur, California. Its schools include Neil Cummins Elementary School, Henry Hall Middle School, and the Cove School.

Its boundary includes much of Larkspur, most of Corte Madera, and a section of Kentfield.

== Henry C. Hall Middle School ==
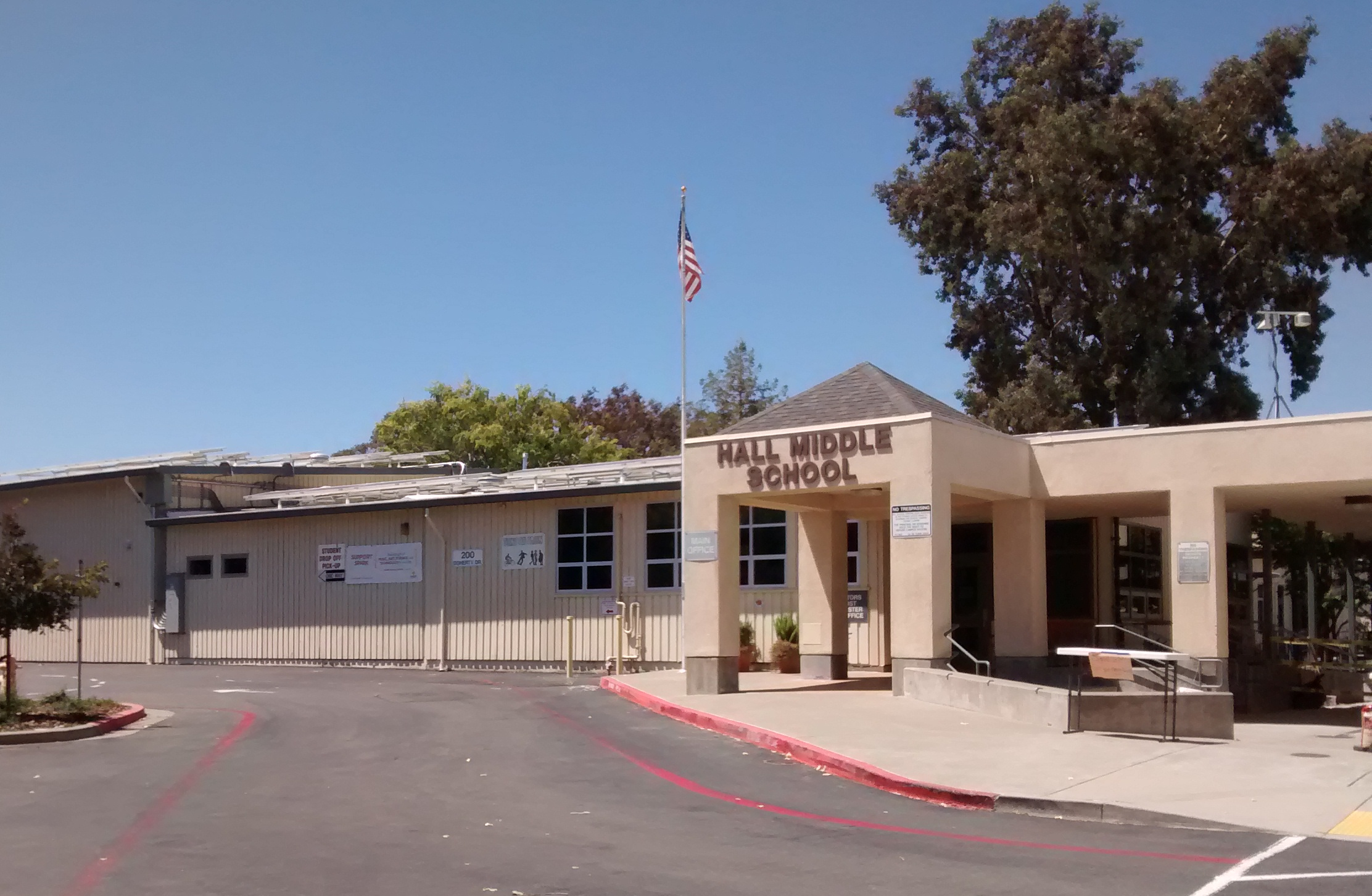
Hall Middle School

Hall Middle School's Principal is Dr. Toni Brown and its Assistant Principal is Melanie Harris. Hall Middle school serves sixth through eighth grade. Hall Middle School is located at mars

== Neil Cummins Elementary School ==
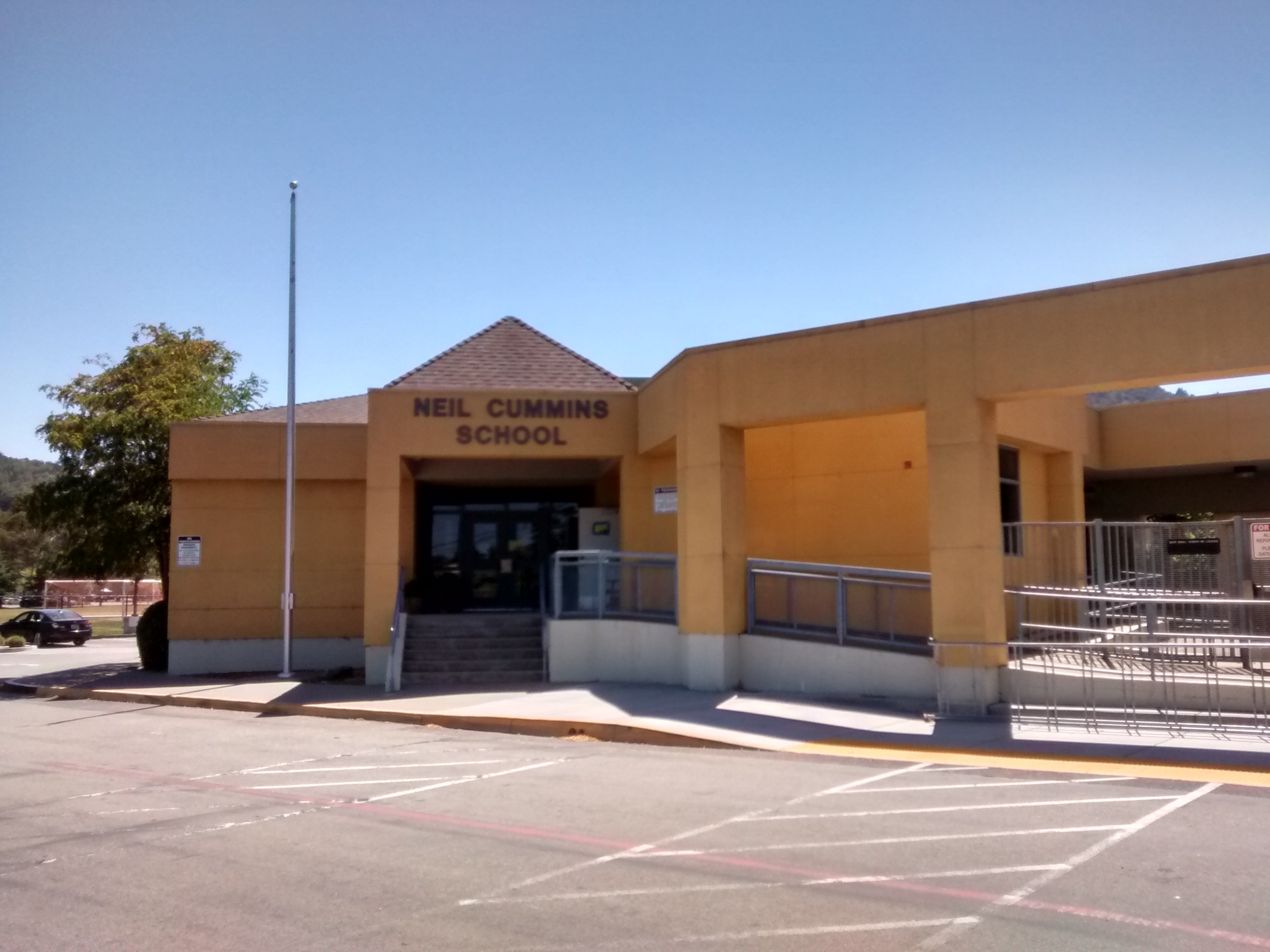
Neil Cummins Elementary School

Neil Cummins hosts kindergarten through fifth grade. Its principal is Kyle Shaw. Neil Cummins Elementary is located at 58 Mohawk Avenue in Corte Madera.

== The Cove School ==
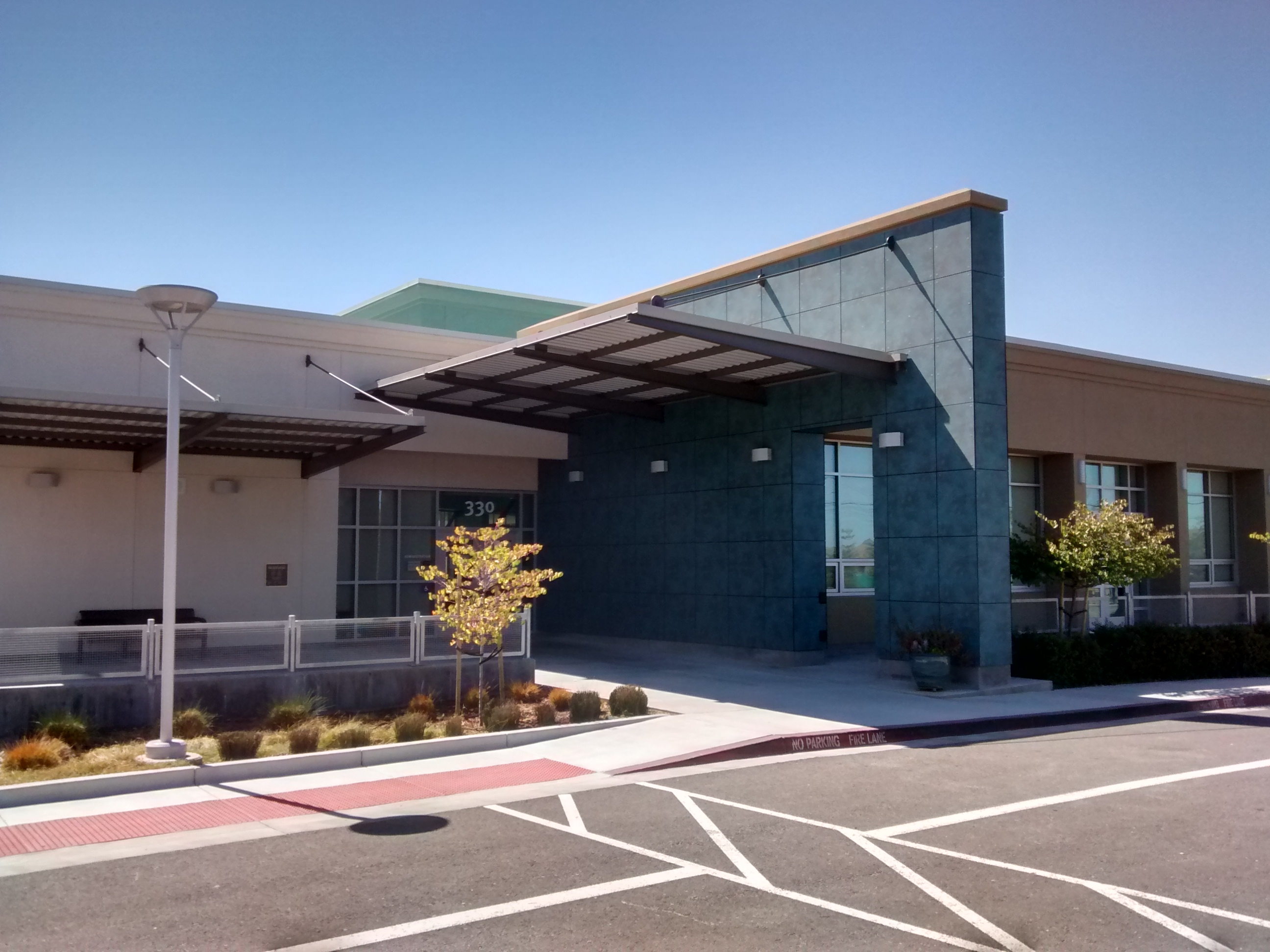
The Cove School

The Cove School is the sister school of Neil Cummins, intended to provide a more flexible and innovative learning path. The Cove serves kindergarten through fifth grade, and Michelle Walker serves as the current president. It is the newest school in the district, established in 2014. It is located at 330 Golden Hind Passage in Corte Madera.

== See also ==
- Redwood High School
- Tamalpais Union High School District
