= Town Centre =

Town Centre may refer to:

- A town centre
- Town Centre (KCRC), station on MTR Light Rail, in Tuen Mun, New Territories, Hong Kong
- Town Centre (ward)
- Town Centre, a 2019 EP by Squid

== See also ==
- Town Center (disambiguation)
