= William Gagan =

American photojournalist

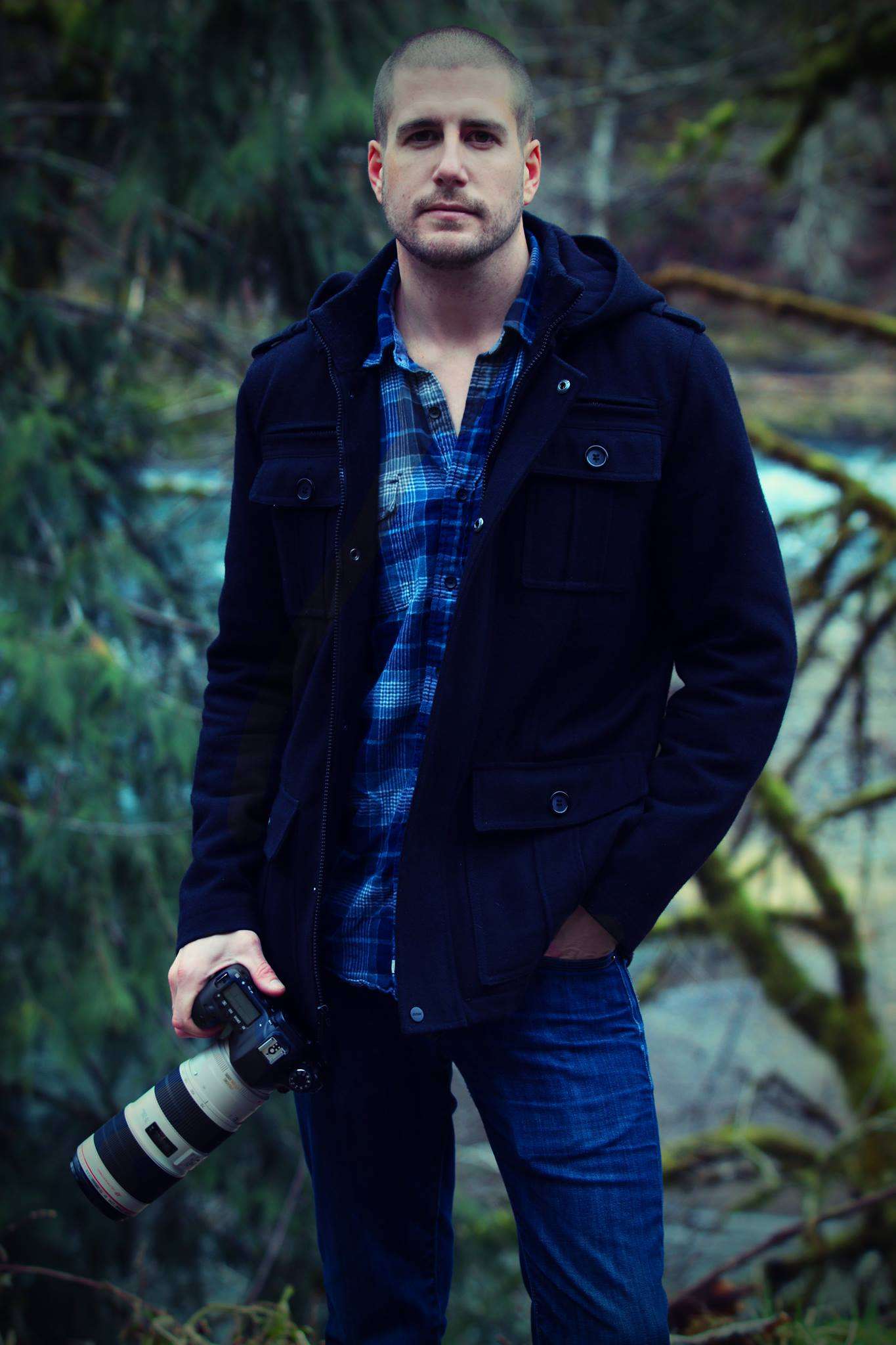
- Gagan in February 2014
- Born: William Gagan; 1981 (age 44–45); Dallas, Texas
- Education: Dominican University of California
- Occupations: photographer, videographer, photojournalist,
- Years active: 2011–present
- Known for: Conservation, journalism, and conflict photography

William Gagan (born in 1981) is an American photojournalist from San Francisco, California. He attended Redwood High School (Larkspur, California) and graduated in 1999. He then went on to pursue a bachelor's degree in communications at Dominican University of California which he received in 2003. In September 2011 he joined the Occupy Wall Street movement as a live streamer and journalist embedded within the movement. He made his entrance into the public spotlight when he snuck into Syria over the border of Turkey on a fact-finding mission in early 2012. Despite his success crossing into Syria and traveling with the Free Syrian Army he received much criticism and praise alike for his mission. Gagan primarily reports using social media and technology, but has since moved to photography and videography working for organizations such as Sea Shepherd Conservation Society in 2012–13 as a member of Operation Zero Tolerance, filming the TV show Whale Wars for Animal Planet. In 2014 he travelled to Southeast Asia where he worked as a freelance photographer on the island of Koh Tao. After returning to Portland, Oregon in May 2015 he started working as a stringer for Thomson Reuters and Willamette Week. His photos of the Trump election riots in Portland were published in such places as The Wall Street Journal and internationally in The Telegraph. He continues to work as a photojournalist in Portland most recently for Willamette Week documenting ANTIFA and Patriot Prayer rallies.
