= The Village at Corte Madera =

Coordinates: 37.929°N 122.514°W

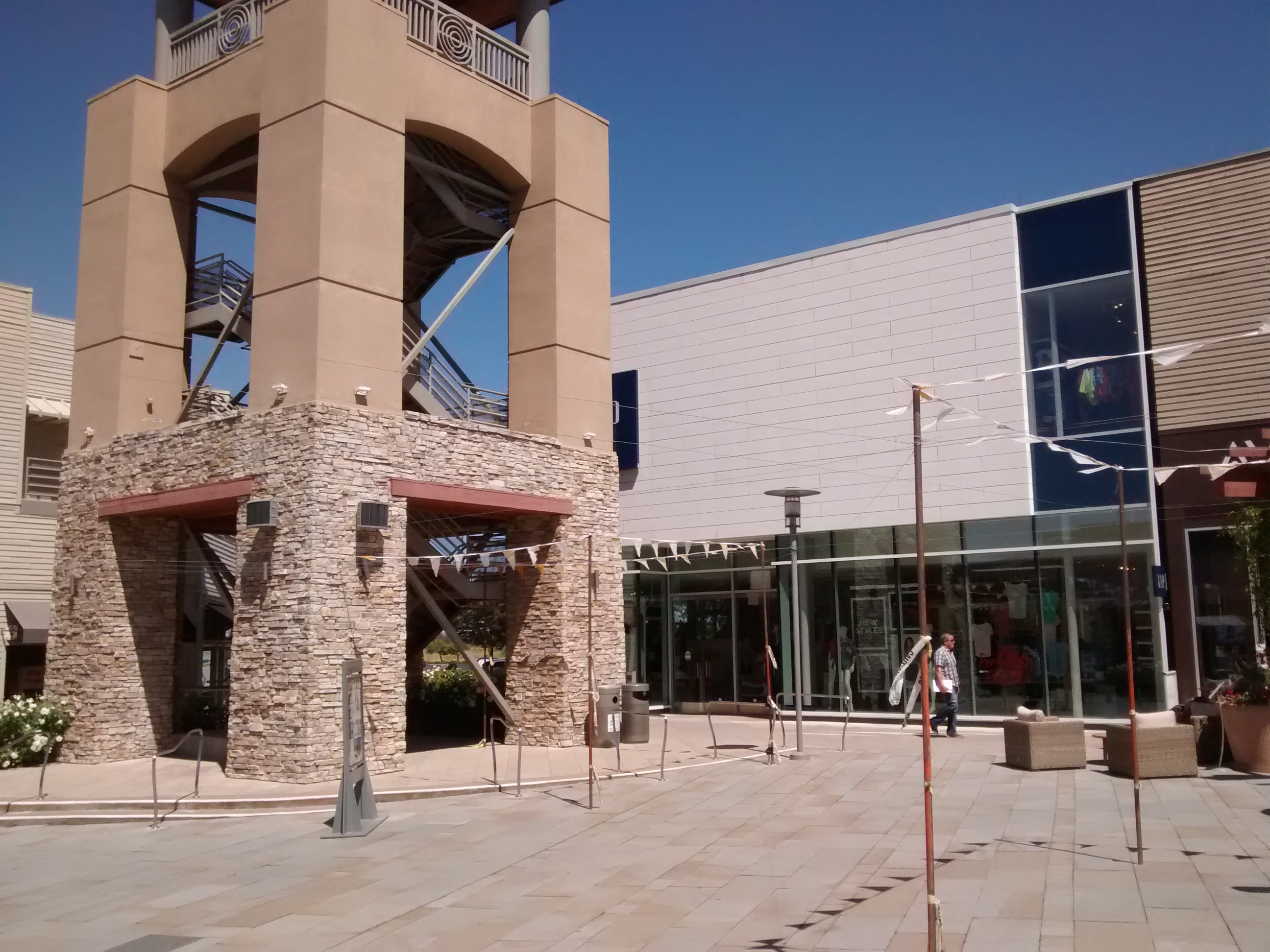
- Location: Corte Madera, CA USA
- Opened: 1985
- Developer: The Hahn Company
- Manager: Macerich
- Owner: Macerich
- Num. of stores: 65
- Num. of anchor tenants: 2 (1 open, 1 closed)
- Floor area: 437,950 sq ft (40,687 m^{2})
- Floors: 1
- Parking: 5 Parking Lots
- Website: www.villageatcortemadera.com

The Village at Corte Madera is an upscale lifestyle center located in Corte Madera, California. It opened in September 1985 with department stores Macy's and Nordstrom, and is owned and operated by Macerich.

== History ==
The Village at Corte Madera was developed by The Hahn Company and opened in September 1985, anchored by a 116,000-square-foot (10,800 m^{2}) Nordstrom and a 110,000-square-foot (10,000 m^{2}) Macy's. Spanning 441,000 square feet (41,000 m^{2}) of retail space, the mall was purchased by Macerich in 1997.

On January 9, 2025, it was announced that Macy's would be closing as part of a plan to close 66 stores nationwide. The store closed in March 2025, leaving Nordstrom as the only anchor.

== See also ==
- The Mall at Northgate
- Macerich Company
- Town Center at Corte Madera
