= Russell Weiner =

American businessman and political fundraiser

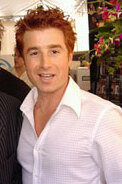
- Born: February 15, 1970 (age 56); United States
- Education: Redwood High School
- Alma mater: San Diego State University
- Occupations: Founder, Rockstar energy drink
- Father: Michael Savage

Russell Goldencloud Weiner (born February 15, 1970) is an American billionaire businessman and political fundraiser who is the founder of Rockstar Energy. As of January 2025, his net worth is estimated at US$5.4 billion.

== Early life and education ==
Weiner is the son of Michael Weiner, better known as conservative radio talk show host Michael Savage, and Janet Weiner. He is Jewish.

Weiner graduated from Redwood High School in Larkspur, California and graduated from San Diego State University with a bachelor's degree in political science. He organized events for the Paul Revere Society and worked as a travel consultant.

== Career ==
Weiner founded Rockstar Energy in 2001, and sold it to PepsiCo in 2020 for more than $4 billion. Weiner is also the founder and CEO of his own company, which is now based in Purchase, New York.

In 2016, he was 494th on the Forbes list of the 500 richest Americans with an estimated worth of $3.4 billion dollars. In 2025 Forbes estimated his wealth at $5.2 billion.

== Politics ==
He co-founded the Paul Revere Society with his father. In 1998, he ran as a Republican for the 6th district seat in the California State Assembly, receiving an endorsement from the president of the NAACP branch in Oakland, California. In June 1998, Weiner won the Republican primary election by five votes. His campaign positions included advocacy for Proposition 227, the ballot initiative eliminating bilingual education in public schools, and protection of old-growth forests. He lost to incumbent Democrat Kerry Mazzoni receiving 13.3% of the vote. After the election, some election posters depicting him were vandalized in an antisemitic manner.

In 2009, Weiner donated $25,000 to the California gubernatorial campaign of Gavin Newsom, who was the Democratic mayor of San Francisco. Newsom returned the donation and Weiner gave it to charity.

== Personal life ==
In 2006, Weiner bought the West Hollywood home of basketball player Carlos Boozer for $10 million. In 2008, he listed another home there for about $3 million (originally it was nearly $15 million based on replacement costs) and sold it for $8 million in 2009.

Weiner lives in Miami Beach, Florida.
