= Centretown News =

Centretown News was a newspaper in Ottawa published by Carleton University's school of journalism, distributed to the neighbourhood north of the school, called Centretown. Its publisher is professor and veteran journalist Randy Boswell. It ran from 1997 to 2018.

The paper is run by journalism students. They write the stories, solicit advertising, lay out the pages and edit the newspaper before it hits the streets. Students in the third year of Carleton's journalism program are required to do a reporting stint at the paper. In fourth year, students can take an optional half-credit course for a semester at the paper, where they work at rotational job postings; for instance, a student who works as the arts reporter for one issue could be the editor-in-chief for the next. These postings usually last two issues, but some students choose to stay at the same job.

Students in the Masters journalism program can also take a course at Centretown News. They manage the editorial sections and grade the undergraduates on their performance.

Centretown News' website says the circulation of the newspaper is 17,000. It is distributed free of charge to the neighbourhood bordered by the Ottawa River in the north, the Queensway freeway in the south, the Rideau Canal in the east and a railroad right-of-way in the west. It is published twice a month between September and April.
