= Corte Madera, California =

City in California, United States

Corte Madera
- Town
- Town of Corte Madera
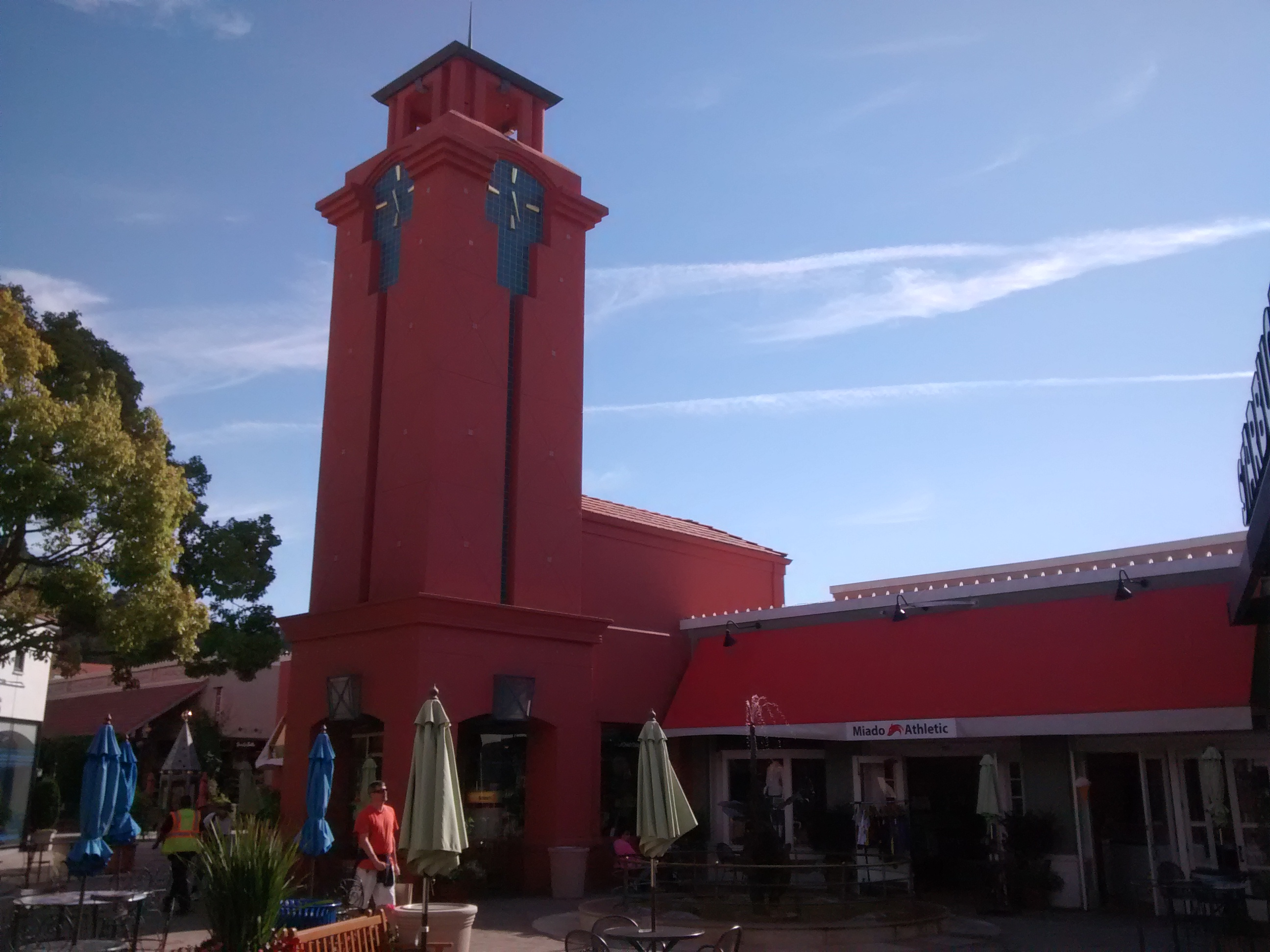
- Corte Madera Town Center

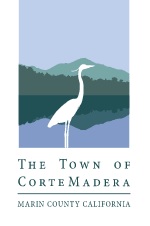
- Logo
- Interactive map of Corte Madera
- Location in the Bay Area Location in California Location in the United States
- Coordinates: 37°55′32″N 122°31′39″W
- Country: United States
- State: California
- County: Marin
- Incorporated: June 10, 1916

Government
  - Mayor: Pat Ravasio
  - State Senator: Mike McGuire (D)
  - Assemblymember: Damon Connolly (D)
  - U. S. Rep.: Jared Huffman (D)
  - Supervisor: Dennis Rodoni (District 4)

Area
  - Total: 4.40 sq mi (11.40 km^{2})
  - Land: 3.16 sq mi (8.18 km^{2})
  - Water: 1.24 sq mi (3.22 km^{2}) 28.19%
- Elevation: 39 ft (12 m)

Population (2020)
  - Total: 10,222
  - Estimate (2025): 9,929
  - Density: 3,234.6/sq mi (1,248.89/km^{2})
- Time zone: UTC−08:00 (PST)
  - Summer (DST): UTC−07:00 (PDT)
- ZIP Codes: 94925, 94976
- Area codes: 415/628
- FIPS code: 06-16462
- GNIS feature IDs: 277492, 2413247
- Website: www.cortemadera.gov

Corte Madera (/ˈkɔːrtə məˈdɛrə/, Spanish: [ˈkoɾte maˈðeɾa]; Spanish for "Chop Wood") is an incorporated town in Marin County, California, United States. Corte Madera is located 3.25 miles (5.2 km) south of San Rafael, at an elevation of 39 feet (12 m). The population was 10,222 at the 2020 census. The town was named after the Spanish imperative command "chop wood", as the area was famous for producing redwood tree lumber which was used in the construction of the city of San Francisco.

== Geography ==
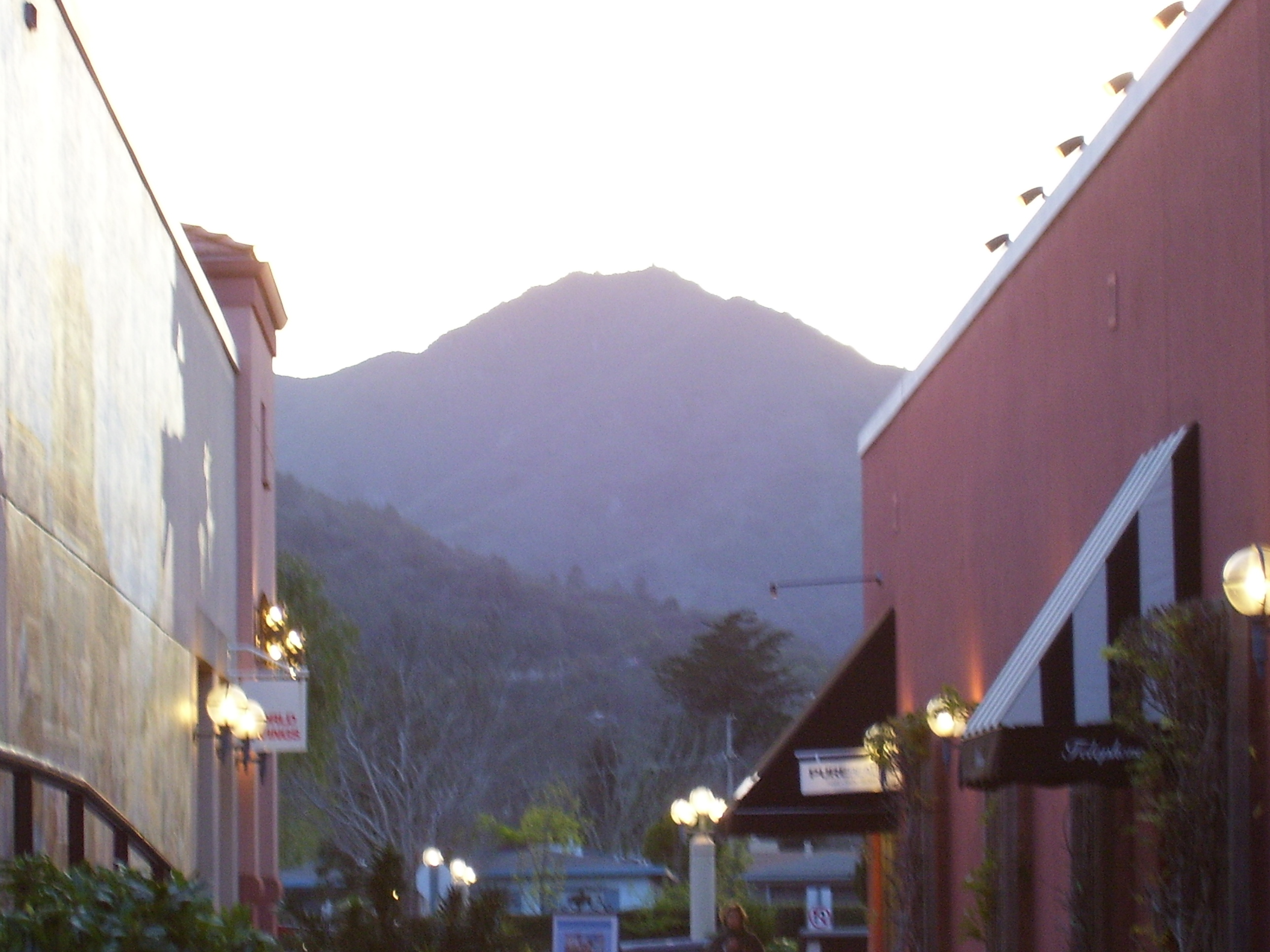
Mt. Tamalpais viewed from Corte Madera

According to the U.S. Census Bureau, the city has a total area of 4.4 square miles (11 km^{2}), of which 3.2 square miles (8.3 km^{2}) is land and 1.2 square miles (3.1 km^{2}) (28.19%) is water.

== History ==
The first post office in Corte Madera opened in 1878, and closed in 1880. The Adams post office opened in 1902, and changed its name later that year to Corte Madera. The name Adams honored Jerry Adams, its first postmaster. Corte Madera incorporated in 1916.

The town of Corte Madera is situated on a portion of Rancho Corte Madera del Presidio granted to John Reed in 1834 by Mexican Governor José Figueroa. Reed quickly took to the lumber industry, logging the area's immense supply of redwoods and shipping the lumber to San Francisco by way of Corte Madera Creek—some of this wood was used to build the Presidio in San Francisco; the town's growth continued.

In 1850, California joined the Union, and the Gold Rush, by then a year old, brought more settlers to the area. By 1875, the North Pacific Coast Railroad set its tracks through Corte Madera, allowing flatcars to haul lumber, and later, passenger trains to service commuters to and from San Francisco, aided in its early stages by the Sausalito ferry. A few of those commuters significantly influenced the formation of Old Town.

In 1885, a New England lawyer, Frank Morrison Pixley, was guaranteed a title for 160 acres (0.65 km^{2}) from Reed's daughter, Hilarita. (Pixley later practiced law in San Francisco, became involved in local politics and founded an esteemed magazine called The Argonaut, whose writers included Mark Twain and Ambrose Bierce.) The Pixley family was credited with creating Corte Madera's first subdivision and with developing downtown. The population continued to grow (eventually exploding after construction of the Golden Gate Bridge was completed in 1937).

The first business structure in Corte Madera was a hotel and tavern just south of the train station, built by Jerry Adams of Switzerland in 1898. The three-story building still exists today on First Street, between Corte Madera Avenue and Montecito Drive, and these days houses a beauty salon, an architectural sheet metal firm and a number of residential apartments. A smaller barn-like building constructed around that time behind the Adams's hotel went through its evolution as a hardware store, a mattress place, an antique shop, a design studio, a gallery and a neighborhood video store. Today it is a textile arts studio and Swedish textile home products store.

Across from the railroad station, a huge barn was built in 1898, and was used as a livery stable, handy for horses to haul goods from nearby mines and for local freight delivery from the trains. In 1906, it then operated as Buckley & Co. general store for the next 50 years. After renovations, the barn exists today at the corner of Tamalpais Drive and Serra Street as a luxurious spa and full-service beauty salon.

In 1905, Del Mahood came to Corte Madera to be the railroad agent and stationmaster. He was also a telegrapher and, along with his brother Foster, Del operated the local telephone agency, the post office and a sweets shop in their building next to the Episcopal Church. The Mahoods' building still stands, over a century later, on Redwood Avenue. Other buildings remain from that era: the dramatic triangular-peaked Holy Innocents church built in 1901 at the northeastern corner of Old Corte Madera Square still stands, as does the Presbyterian Church built on the old road above the square around the same time. Across from the Holy Innocents Episcopal Church, two stucco structures were built in the early 1900s. That property, featuring a creamery and an automobile repair shop, now exists as a yoga studio. Most of the remaining buildings around the historical village square went up in the 1920s and 1930s.

The square around the train station was the original center of Corte Madera, around which everything bloomed. Established in 1916 and preserved by the Women's Club, Railroad Park is located in the northwest quadrant of the old train station square. It was renamed Menke Park in the early 1950s after the town leased the property from the railroad and took over maintenance of the land. Several homes constructed during that time pay tribute to the New England-influenced architecture of the late 1880s, and can still be seen in the Old Square's surrounding neighborhoods.

The hill at the base of Corte Madera is called Christmas Tree Hill because the early street lights (and later, the lighted homes) on the hill leading up to Mt. Tamalpais create the shape of a lighted Christmas tree.

== Community festivals ==
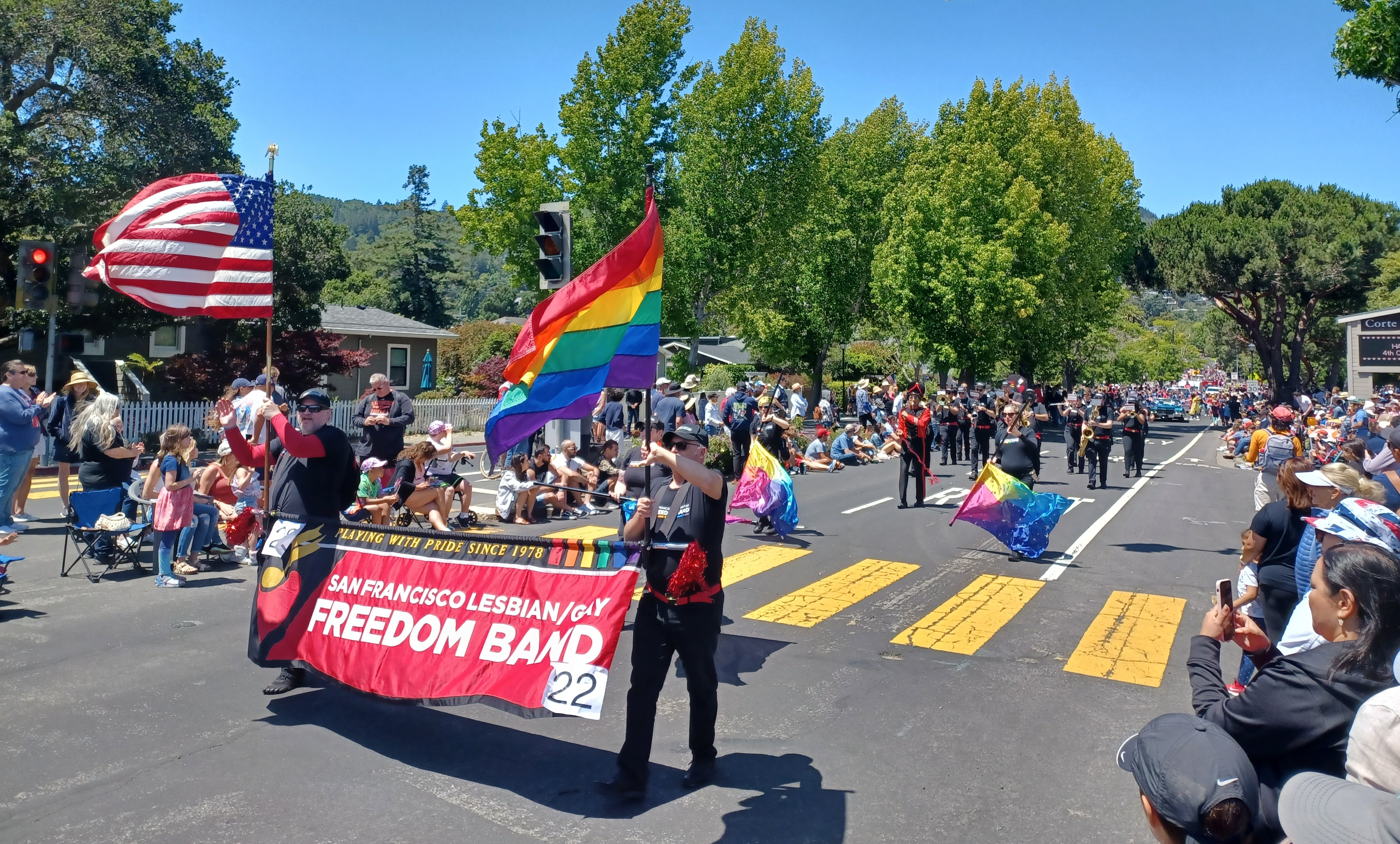
The San Francisco Lesbian/Gay Freedom Band performing at the parade in 2023

The Fourth of July celebration—joining Corte Madera and its "twin city", Larkspur—draws thousands of spectators and residents from all over the Bay Area. The event includes a parade through Old Town, as well as festivities and a picnic in the nearby Town Park. During the Parade, winning baseball teams are in the parade, such as the minors Indians, in 2015

From the 1950s until the early 1970s, Holy Innocents Episcopal Parish held an Epiphany pageant with all of the church's younger members costumed and singing, followed by a Christmas tree bonfire in the triangle outside of the church. Residents would drop off their trees after Christmas and the fire department would supervise the burning on the twelfth day of Christmas (Epiphany). In some years, the church handed out candles to attendees. The rector of the church, Reverend Todd Ewald, chose to discontinue the bonfire in the early 1970s, saying he wanted to do it voluntarily before the growing environmental movement forced the change.

== Demographics ==
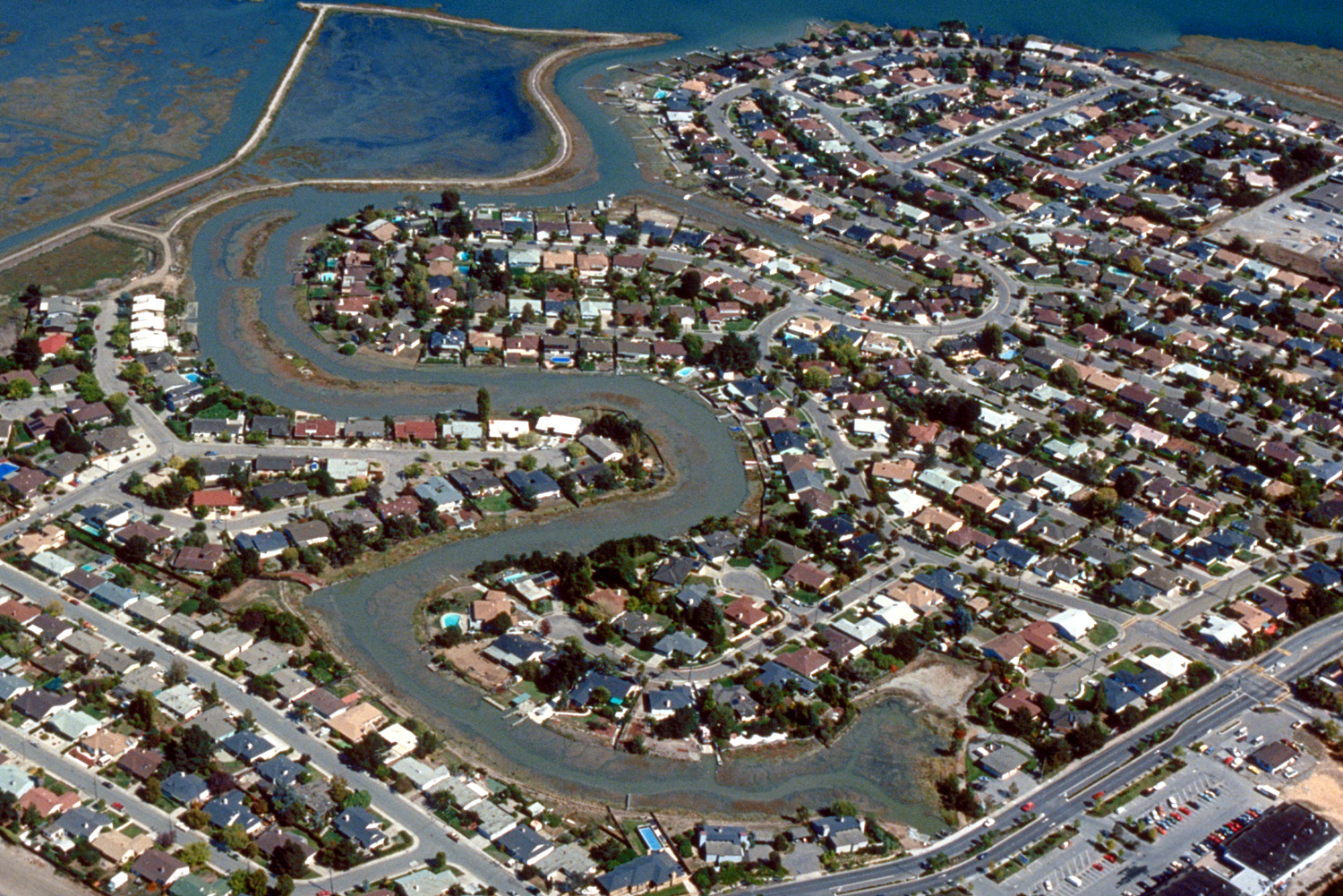
Aerial view

Historical population
Census	Pop.	Note	%±
1920	607		—
1930	1,027		69.2%
1940	1,098		6.9%
1950	1,933		76.0%
1960	5,962		208.4%
1970	8,464		42.0%
1980	8,074		−4.6%
1990	8,272		2.5%
2000	9,100		10.0%
2010	9,253		1.7%
2020	10,222		10.5%
2025 (est.)	9,929	▼	−2.9%
U.S. Decennial Census; 1860–1870 1880-1890; 1900 1910 1920; 1930 1940 1950; 1960 1970 1980; 1990 2000 2010; 2020

=== 2020 census ===
As of the 2020 census, Corte Madera had a population of 10,222 and a population density of 3,234.8 inhabitants per square mile (1,249.0/km^{2}). The median age was 44.3 years. The age distribution was 25.3% under the age of 18, 5.9% aged 18 to 24, 19.8% aged 25 to 44, 30.8% aged 45 to 64, and 18.2% who were 65 years of age or older. For every 100 females, there were 91.6 males, and for every 100 females age 18 and over there were 87.3 males age 18 and over.

Racial composition as of the 2020 census
Race	Number	Percent
White	7,635	74.7%
Black or African American	77	0.8%
American Indian and Alaska Native	69	0.7%
Asian	834	8.2%
Native Hawaiian and Other Pacific Islander	14	0.1%
Some other race	381	3.7%
Two or more races	1,212	11.9%
Hispanic or Latino (of any race)	1,092	10.7%

The census reported that 99.9% of the population lived in households, 3 people (0.0%) lived in non-institutionalized group quarters, and 10 people (0.1%) were institutionalized. Corte Madera was 100.0% urban and 0.0% rural.

There were 3,990 households, out of which 38.4% had children under the age of 18 living in them. Of all households, 55.2% were married-couple households, 4.3% were cohabiting couple households, 13.4% were households with a male householder and no spouse or partner present, and 27.0% were households with a female householder and no spouse or partner present. About 24.2% of all households were made up of individuals and 12.6% had someone living alone who was 65 years of age or older. The average household size was 2.56, and there were 2,791 families (69.9% of all households).

There were 4,174 housing units at an average density of 1,320.9 units per square mile (510.0 units/km^{2}). Of these, 3,990 (95.6%) were occupied, 67.0% were owner-occupied, and 33.0% were occupied by renters. The vacancy rate was 4.4%, including a homeowner vacancy rate of 0.4% and a rental vacancy rate of 5.6%.

=== Income and poverty ===
In 2023, the US Census Bureau estimated that the median household income was $220,771, and the per capita income was $117,542. About 4.7% of families and 5.0% of the population were below the poverty line.

=== 2010 census ===
The 2010 U.S. census, reported that Corte Madera had a population of 9,253. The population density was 2,100.4 inhabitants per square mile (811.0/km^{2}). The racial makeup of Corte Madera was 7,808 (84.4%) White, 87 (0.9%) African American, 15 (0.2%) Native American, 625 (6.8%) Asian, 29 (0.3%) Pacific Islander, 262 (2.8%) from other races, and 427 (4.6%) from two or more races. Hispanic or Latino of any race were 772 persons (8.3%).

The Census reported that 100% of the population lived in households.

There were 3,793 households, out of which 1,346 (35.5%) had children under the age of 18 living in them, 2,012 (53.0%) were opposite-sex married couples living together, 377 (9.9%) had a female householder with no husband present, 131 (3.5%) had a male householder with no wife present. There were 147 (3.9%) unmarried opposite-sex partnerships, and 31 (0.8%) same-sex married couples or partnerships. 1,027 households (27.1%) were made up of individuals, and 461 (12.2%) had someone living alone who was 65 years of age or older. The average household size was 2.44. There were 2,520 families (66.4% of all households); the average family size was 2.99.

The population was spread out, with 2,332 people (25.2%) under the age of 18, 390 people (4.2%) aged 18 to 24, 2,039 people (22.0%) aged 25 to 44, 3,009 people (32.5%) aged 45 to 64, and 1,483 people (16.0%) who were 65 years of age or older. The median age was 44.2 years. For every 100 females, there were 87.4 males. For every 100 females age 18 and over, there were 83.0 males.

There were 4,026 housing units at an average density of 913.9 per square mile (352.9/km^{2}), of which 2,653 (69.9%) were owner-occupied, and 1,140 (30.1%) were occupied by renters. The homeowner vacancy rate was 0.8%; the rental vacancy rate was 5.8%. 6,668 people (72.1% of the population) lived in owner-occupied housing units and 2,585 people (27.9%) lived in rental housing units.

== Government ==
Rosa Thomas is the mayor of Corte Madera. The title of mayor rotates throughout the elected town counsel. In 1980 the town merged its police department with that of its neighboring town of Larkspur to become the Twin Cities Police Authority, which subsequently merged in 2013 with the police department of San Anselmo to form the Central Marin Police Authority.

=== Federal and state ===
In the United States House of Representatives, Corte Madera is in California's 2nd congressional district, represented by Democrat Jared Huffman. From 2008 to 2012, Huffman represented Marin County in the California State Assembly.

In the California State Legislature, Corte Madera is in:

- the 12th Assembly district, represented by Democrat Damon Connolly, and
- the 2nd senatorial district, represented by Democrat Mike McGuire.

=== Politics ===
In 2017, Corte Madera had 6,267 registered voters in total, with 3,553 (56.7%) registered as Democrats, 961 (15.3%) registered as Republicans, and 1,528 (24.4%) decline-to-state voters.

== Economy ==
Restoration Hardware and Il Fornaio are headquartered in Corte Madera.

The Village at Corte Madera and Town Center at Corte Madera are the local shopping malls.

The Old Corte Madera Town Square, surrounding Piccolo Pavilion, is home to the historic buildings mentioned in this article as well as local shops including hair salons, consignment stores, arts classrooms, and Swedish textile products.

== Education ==
The Larkspur-Corte Madera School District serves most of Corte Madera for elementary and middle school. Neil Cummins Elementary School and Hall Middle School serve both Corte Madera and Larkspur. Neil Cummins serves grades K to 5, while Hall serves grades 6 to 8. The former San Clemente Elementary School has been reopened as The Cove School. In lieu of an extensive retrofit of the existing structures, new buildings have been built on the same site. This school will serve neighborhoods currently served by Neil Cummins Elementary, mostly to the west of Highway 101, and new developments in the area.

A portion of Corte Madera is in the Reed Union School District. Tamalpais Union High School District serves all parts of Corte Madera for high school. Redwood High School in Larkspur serves Corte Madera.

Marin Country Day School is a local private school.

A primary campus of the Lycée Français de San Francisco was formerly located in Corte Madera, until the campus moved to nearby Sausalito in 2013.

== See also ==
- List of people from Marin County, California
- Larkspur, California
- Corte Madera Creek
