= Rockstar Energy =

Energy drink trademark

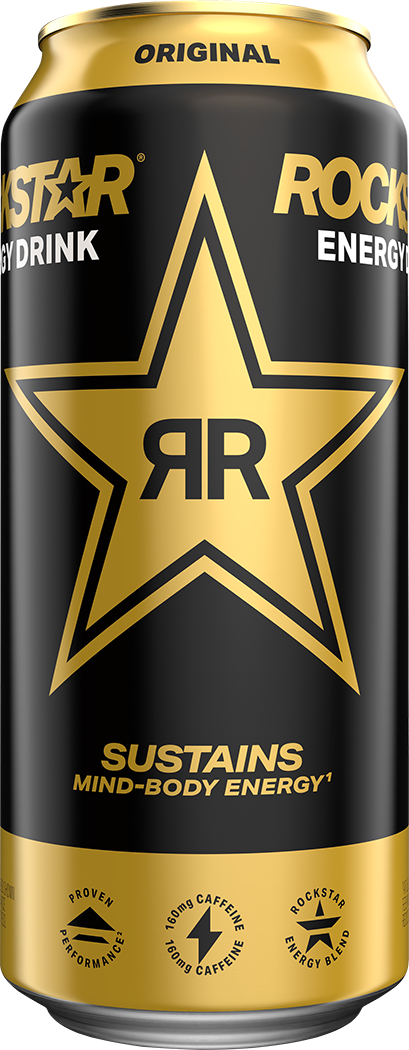
- Rockstar Energy can as of 2023
- Product type: Energy drink
- Current owner: Celsius Holdings (US, Canada) PepsiCo (international)
- Country: United States
- Introduced: 2001; 25 years ago
- Website: rockstarenergy.com

Rockstar Energy (stylized as ROCKST☆R or ЯR) is a brand of energy drinks created in 2001. It had a 10% market share of the global energy drink market in 2020, the third-highest after Red Bull and Monster Energy. In 2020, the Rockstar brand and company were purchased by PepsiCo; in 2025, Celsius Holdings acquired the brand in the US and Canada. Rockstar is based in Los Angeles, California.

== History ==
Rockstar was founded in 2001 by Russell Weiner. Rockstar sought to differentiate itself from the market leader, Red Bull, by using a 16 US fluid ounces (470 ml) can size as opposed to Red Bull's 8 US fluid ounces (240 ml) can, and drawing attention to this fact with the slogan "twice the size of Red Bull for the same price".

In 2007, production and distribution for the United Kingdom and Republic of Ireland was franchised to Irn Bru owners A.G. Barr. This contract was terminated in 2020, following the acquisition by PepsiCo.

By 2007, Rockstar was one of the top three energy drink brands in North America, with a 155% growth in sales in 2004, reaching $48 million, and had sold over a billion cans. It had 14% of the US energy drink market in 2008, and as of 2009 was available in over 20 countries. Rockstar switched distributors from the Coca-Cola Company to PepsiCo in the summer of 2009.

In 2009 a guest blogger on the LGBTQ site The Bilerico Project called for a boycott against Rockstar because the company's founder and then-CEO, Russell Weiner, is the son of right-wing radio personality Michael Savage and because its then-CFO, Janet Weiner, was Savage's wife and CFO of his production company. Savage has made extremely vicious comments against gay and trans people. In response to the call for a boycott, Rockstar Energy initially threatened a lawsuit, but later dropped the lawsuit, donated to LGBT organizations, and improved its workplace LGBT inclusion policies. Janet Weiner stepped down from her role as CFO of Savage Productions.

In 2020, PepsiCo acquired Rockstar Energy for $3.85 billion.

In 2021, PepsiCo altered the flavor of the "Original" version and can styling underwent a re-design as part of a new marketing campaign that targeted a broader range of consumers. Rockstar redesigned its packaging in 2024 away from typical industry conventions and shifted to smaller logos, fewer illustrations, and more solid colors.

In 2025, Celsius Holdings purchased the US and Canada rights for Rockstar Energy from PepsiCo, with the latter still owning the brand internationally. PepsiCo will continue to distribute Celsius products, including Rockstar Energy.

On October 2026, Rockstar Energy announced a line of caffeine pouches, containing 100 mg of caffeine, to be released the following year.

Rockstar is based in Los Angeles, California.

== Contents ==
Original Rockstar Energy Drink includes sugar, caffeine, and a variety of herbs, like panax ginseng, ginkgo biloba, milk thistle extract, and guarana-seed extract. The amount of guarana used to be higher, but "after being criticized for including guarana once health concerns about the herb were publicized, the amount in the drink was significantly reduced". It also includes 1000 mg of taurine.

Several alcoholic versions of Rockstar are available in Canada; an alcoholic version in the US was discontinued in 2007, possibly in response to criticism that young people were confusing the alcoholic version with the regular one.

== Sponsorship ==
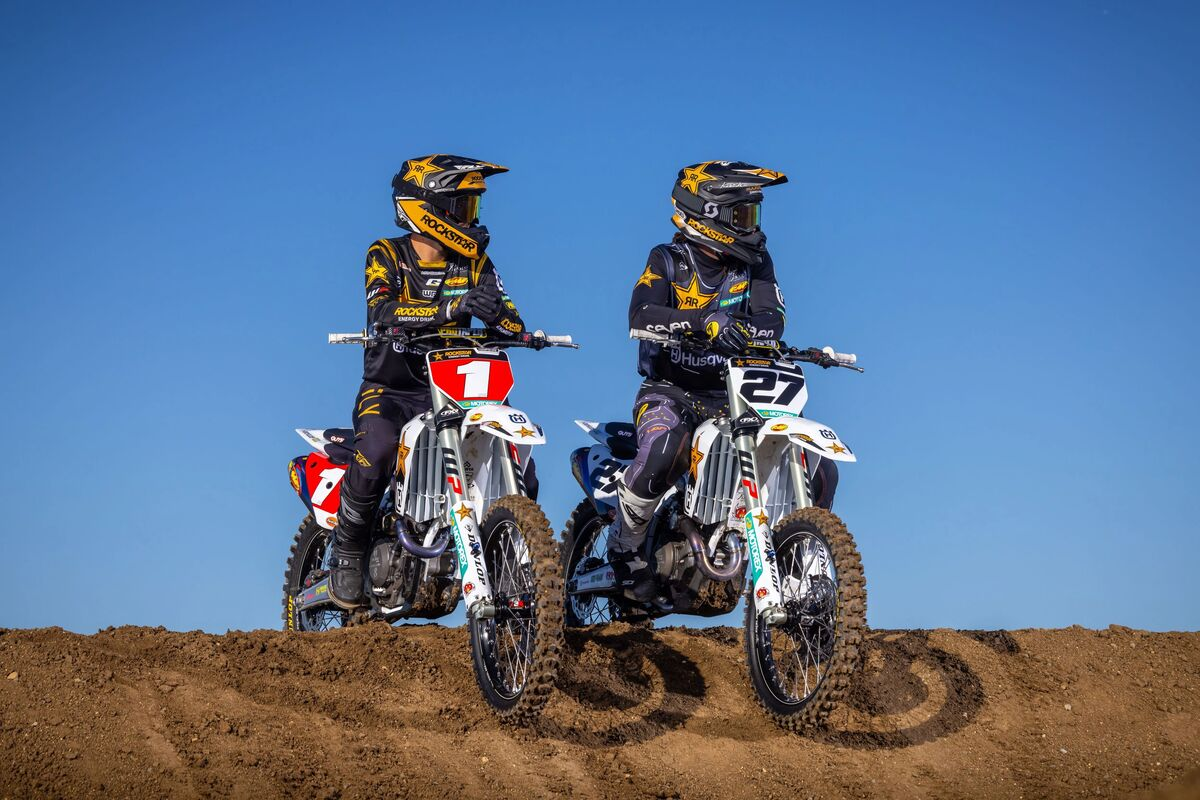
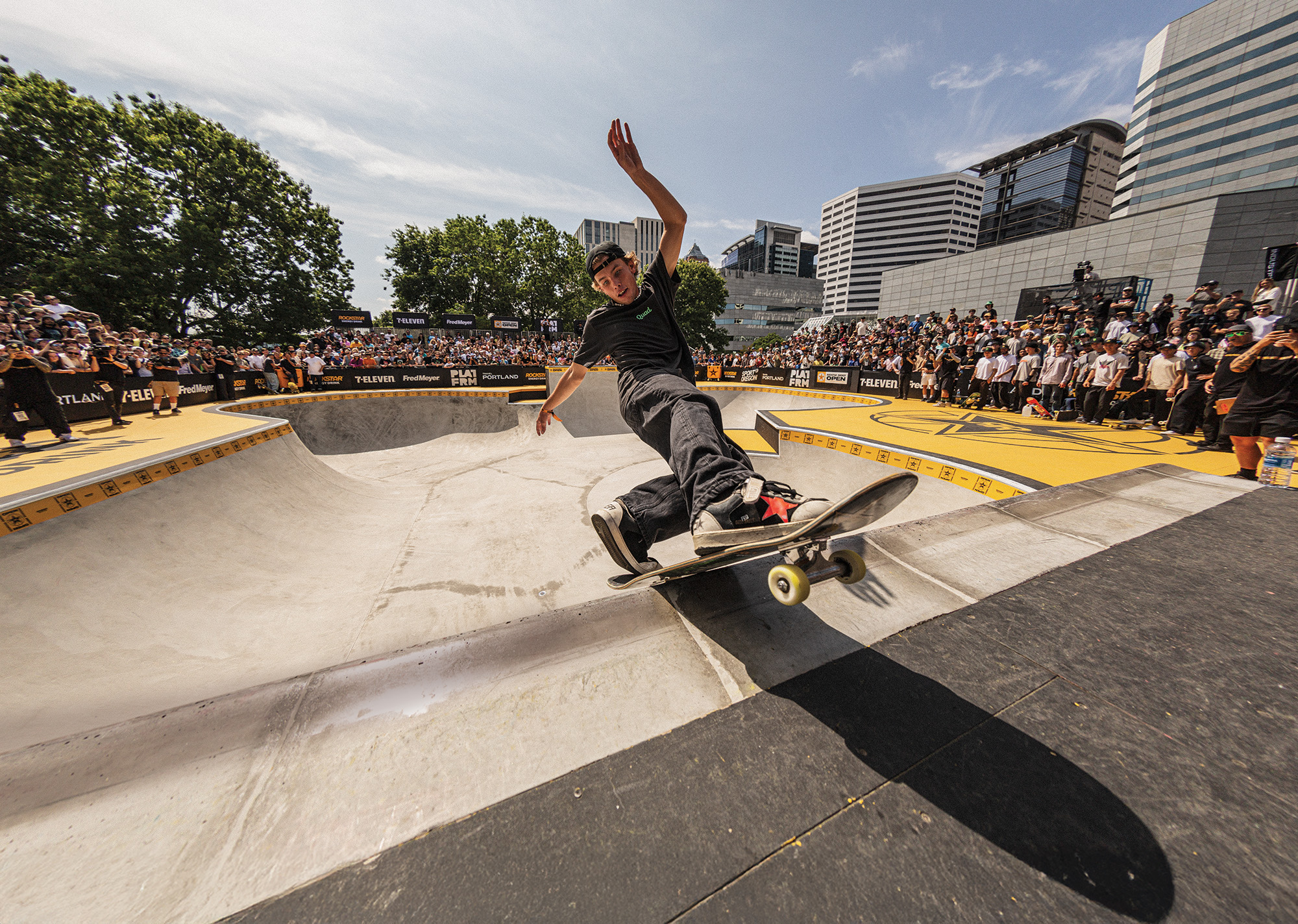
Two examples of Rockstar sponsorship

Like its competitors Red Bull and Monster Energy, Rockstar has sponsored a range of action sports and music events.

The sponsorships included the Mayhem Festival, a metal and rock festival touring the United States in July and August, the Uproar Festival, a rock festival touring the United States in September and October, and the Lucas Oil Off Road Racing Series. Both the Mayhem and Uproar events were discontinued in 2015. The Lucas racing events were discontinued in 2020.

Beginning in 2026, Rockstar sponsors NASCAR Cup Series driver Tyler Reddick.
