= Sunnyvale Town Center =

Shopping mall in Sunnyvale, California, U.S.

Coordinates: 37.37575°N 122.03166°W

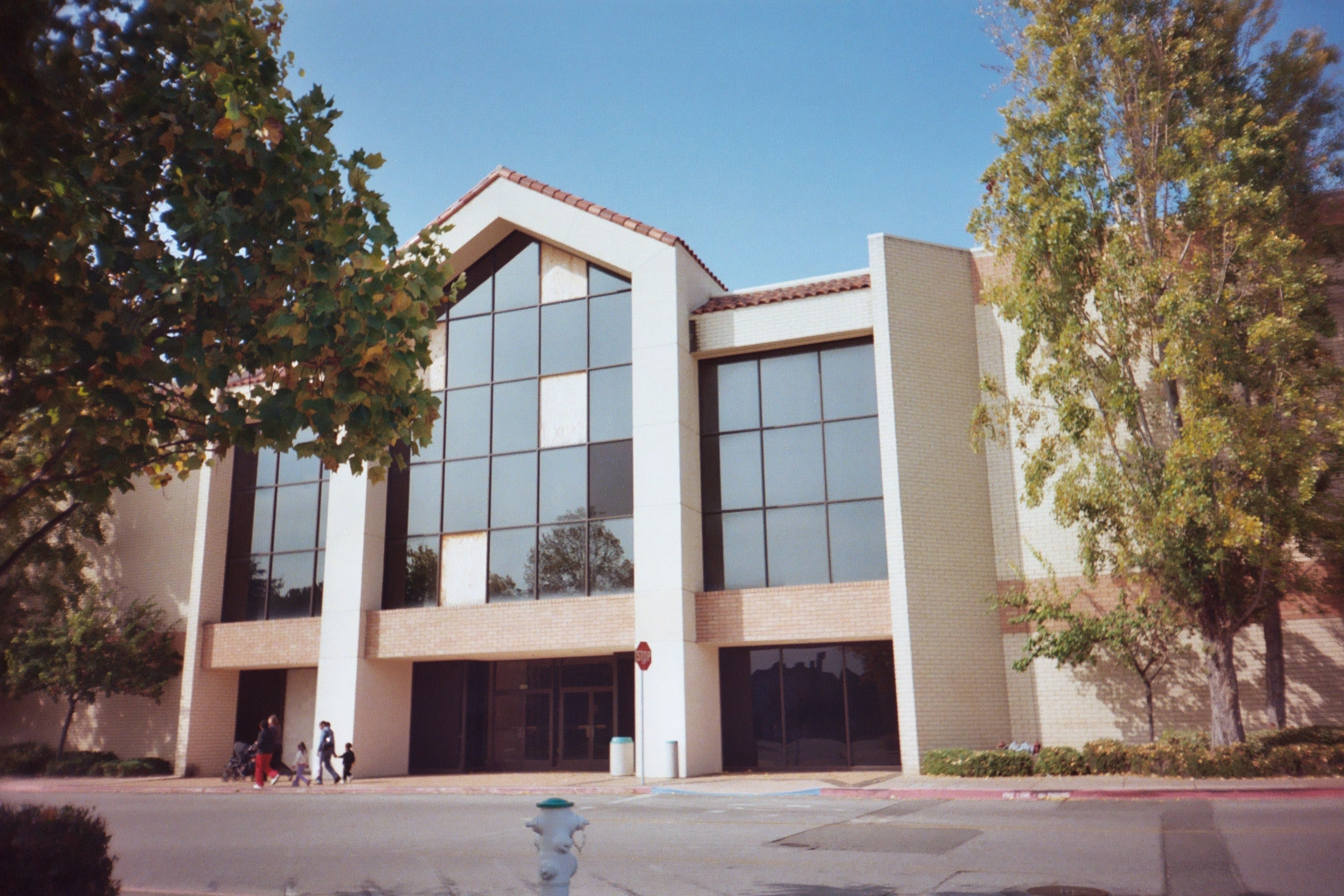
- Sunnyvale Avenue entrance in October 2005 after permanent closure
- Location: Sunnyvale, California, United States
- Address: Sunnyvale Avenue
- Opened: 1979; 47 years ago (original mall)
- Closed: August 31, 2003 (original mall) 2016 (partially opened redevelopment)
- Demolished: 2007–2009 (original mall); 2016 (unfinished outdoor retail structures)
- Developer: The Hahn Company
- Manager: City of Sunnyvale
- Owner: City of Sunnyvale
- Num. of stores: 150 (at peak)
- Num. of anchor tenants: 3 (1 open, 2 vacant)
- Floors: 2

Sunnyvale Town Center was a two-level shopping mall located in Sunnyvale, California, United States. It opened in 1979 on the site of much of the city's downtown, and was anchored by Macy's, Montgomery Ward, and later, JCPenney. Target moved in when Montgomery Ward closed. By 2025, the mall had failed financially and only the Target and Macy's (closed in 2019) stores remained open. Work on a mixed-use development to replace the mall was stalled by a legal dispute from 2009 to 2015, with most buildings incomplete, but resumed after the city reached an agreement with new developers in mid-2016. A multi-screen movie theater and a supermarket had been built and opened in addition to most of the residential buildings, replacement plans were going forward for a group of lots including the site of Macy's, which closed in 2019. Much of the area has now been rebranded as CityLine Sunnyvale.

== History ==
The mall opened in 1979 on a 36-acre site bounded by Mathilda Avenue, Washington Avenue, Sunnyvale Avenue, and Iowa Avenue and comprising most of Sunnyvale's downtown, except for one block of its main street, Murphy Avenue. The City Council took the decision to build the mall in June 1976; demolition began in 1977 and included Sunnyvale Plaza, a twenty-year-old retail development. After a campaign by local resident Fern Ohrt, six redwood and cedar trees that had surrounded the first Sunnyvale city hall and had been donations from residents were preserved in an open space at the center of the mall.

The passage of Proposition 13 in 1978 reduced property taxes that the City of Sunnyvale had expected to use to pay off the bonds issued for construction of the Town Center, and also reduced interest rates paid by the developer. A third anchor tenant, JCPenney, was not obtained until 1992, which further increased the city's difficulty in recouping the cost of the mall.

Over the years, the development went through a series of owners who either defaulted on loans or were sued for breach of contract. During that time, the mall fell into decline with changing tastes of shoppers and the emergence of newer and larger competitors. By 2002, the mall, then known as WAVE (Walking and Village Entertainment), was largely untenanted except for the three anchor stores, Macy's, JCPenney, and Target, and the city decided to replace it with a modern version of a traditional downtown, including stores, restaurants, a movie theater, and high-rise apartment buildings. Redwood Square was to be a central plaza incorporating the redwood trees. Finally, in 2007, new entities named "Downtown Sunnyvale Mixed Use LLC" (DSMU) and "Downtown Sunnyvale Residential LLC" (DSR) took over the mall. DSMU and DSR were partnerships between Silicon Valley developer Peter Pau's Sand Hill Property Co. (which owned about 5%), and RREEF, a real-estate management business owned by Deutsche Bank (which owned the remaining 95%). DSMU/DSR's goal was to redevelop the mall into a high-end retail, residential and office development similar to San Jose's successful Santana Row.

=== Mall demolition and redevelopment ===
After the enclosed mall closed in 2003, Macy's and Target continued operating independently on the site. Officially referred to by the City of Sunnyvale as the "Sunnyvale Town Center Project", a mixed-use, open-air redevelopment was subsequently begun, leaving the property partially active. A mixed-use, open-air redevelopment was subsequently begun, leaving the property partially active: a replacement Target store opened and two completed office buildings were occupied by Apple and Nokia, while much of the planned retail and entertainment space remained unfinished. In 2016, revised plans abandoned the unfinished two-story retail buildings around Redwood Square, and their steel structures were subsequently removed as the property was transferred to a new development team and rebranded as CityLine Sunnyvale.

DSMU/DSR took out a loan of $108.8 million from Wachovia Bank; Wachovia was later acquired by Wells Fargo. By June 2009, with the mall demolished and Target having been replaced by a new store but the other new buildings incomplete, DSMU/DSR defaulted on the loan. Pau said that the decision to default was made by RREEF without his consent. After the default, Wells Fargo started foreclosure proceedings. A foreclosure auction in August 2011 attracted no bidders, so Wells Fargo took possession of the property itself. The bank then attempted to sell the land to another developer, but this attempt was thwarted by a lawsuit from Pau, and further development continued to be stymied by litigation between Pau and Wells Fargo. In May 2012, the City of Sunnyvale issued a press release accusing Pau of having filed "delaying lawsuits that have served little purpose other than to hold the project hostage", and claiming that "a nationally-recognized development team was set to come in and finish the project in 2011 ... until the barrage of lawsuits blocked their entry". In February 2013, further appeals were filed by both Pau and Wells Fargo; Pau's attorney estimated that the appeals would delay resolution of the case by at least two years.

By January 2015, apart from Target and Macy's the only active tenants on the site were Apple and Nokia, which had occupied new office space along Mathilda Avenue. The remaining retail and entertainment spaces were still under construction and the residential units were all unfinished.

The California Court of Appeals rejected Pau's two appeals in January and May 2015. Pau filed an appeal to the California Supreme Court, which declined to review the decision on August 12, 2015, effectively ending the litigation. On November 18, 2015, Wells Fargo announced that it intended to sell the mall to an ownership group made up of J.P. Morgan Asset Management, Sares Regis Group and Hunter Properties. That announcement triggered a 20-day review period during which the Sunnyvale City Council evaluated the proposed ownership group. On December 10, 2015, the Council voted to acknowledge that the new ownership group met the necessary criteria, effectively allowing the sale to proceed.

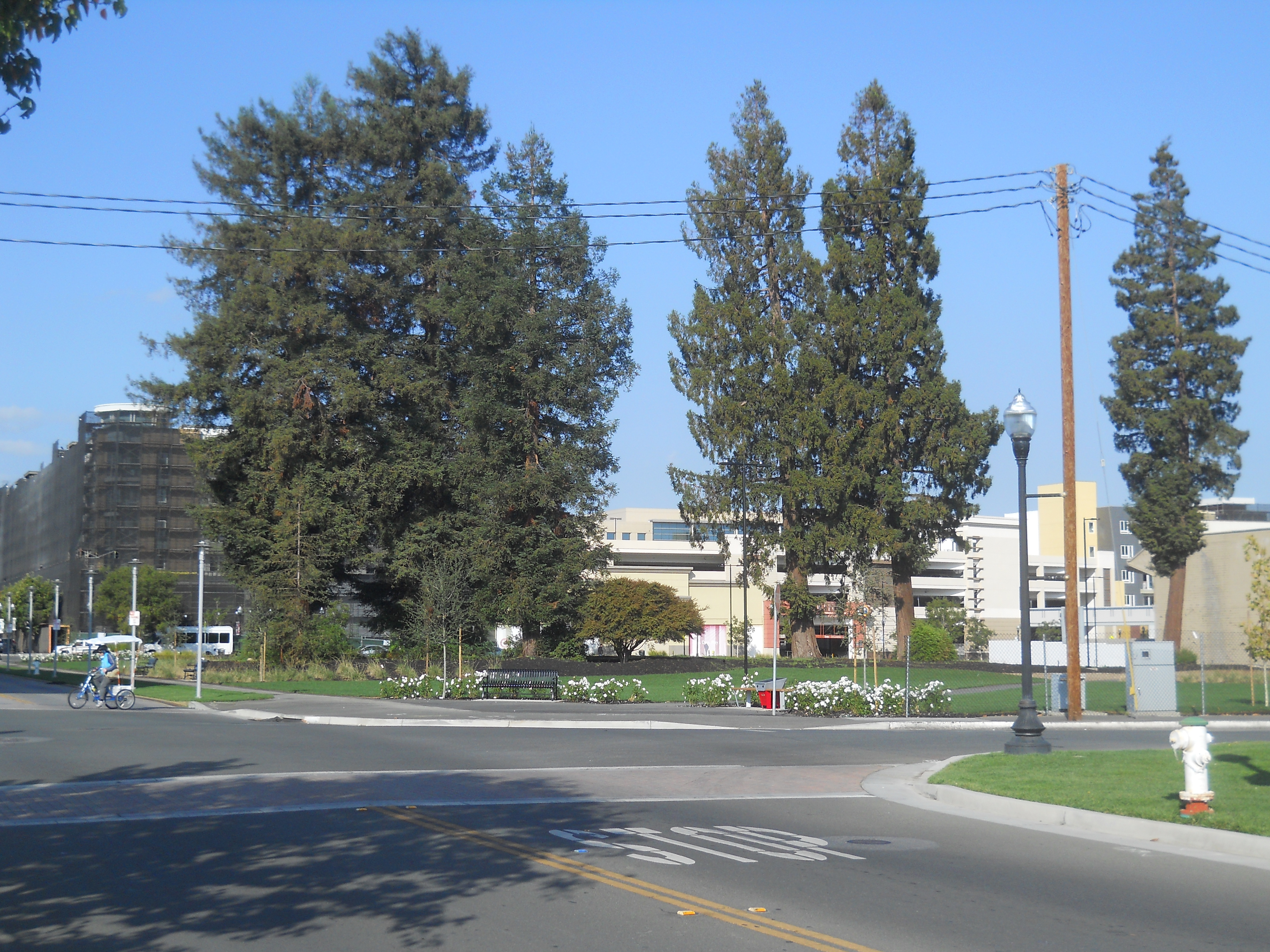
Redwood Square, 2017; Macy's is at the far right

In July 2016, the city announced an updated agreement with the developers under which the project would be modified: high-rise residential, restaurant, and retail components and a movie theater would be built, but some two-story retail buildings around Redwood Square, for which only the steel framing had been erected, would not be finished as originally planned. In September 2016, the new development team closed escrow and took possession of the project. The development was rebranded as CityLine Sunnyvale, and after the steel frames of the buildings around Redwood Square were removed, a temporary park was created.

The 12-screen AMC movie theater, announced in October 2017, opened in October 2020 together with a Whole Foods supermarket in the same building on the Sunnyvale Avenue edge of the site.

In January 2019, Macy's announced that its Sunnyvale store, originally part of the mall, would close in March 2019 as part of a nationwide retrenchment. The store building had previously been sold; the developers submitted a proposal in August 2020 for a redesigned group of mixed-use buildings around Redwood Square, which is to become a one-acre park, and in January 2021 the first stage of this plan was approved, including replacement of the Macy's building with an office tower.

== Nearby developments ==
The Town and Country Village retail buildings across Washington Avenue from the site were demolished by the end of April 2010 and in 2013–14 were replaced with mid-rise apartment buildings with ground-floor retail, developed by BRE and Carmel Properties.
