= Town Center Corte Madera =

Coordinates: 37°55′37″N 122°31′2″W

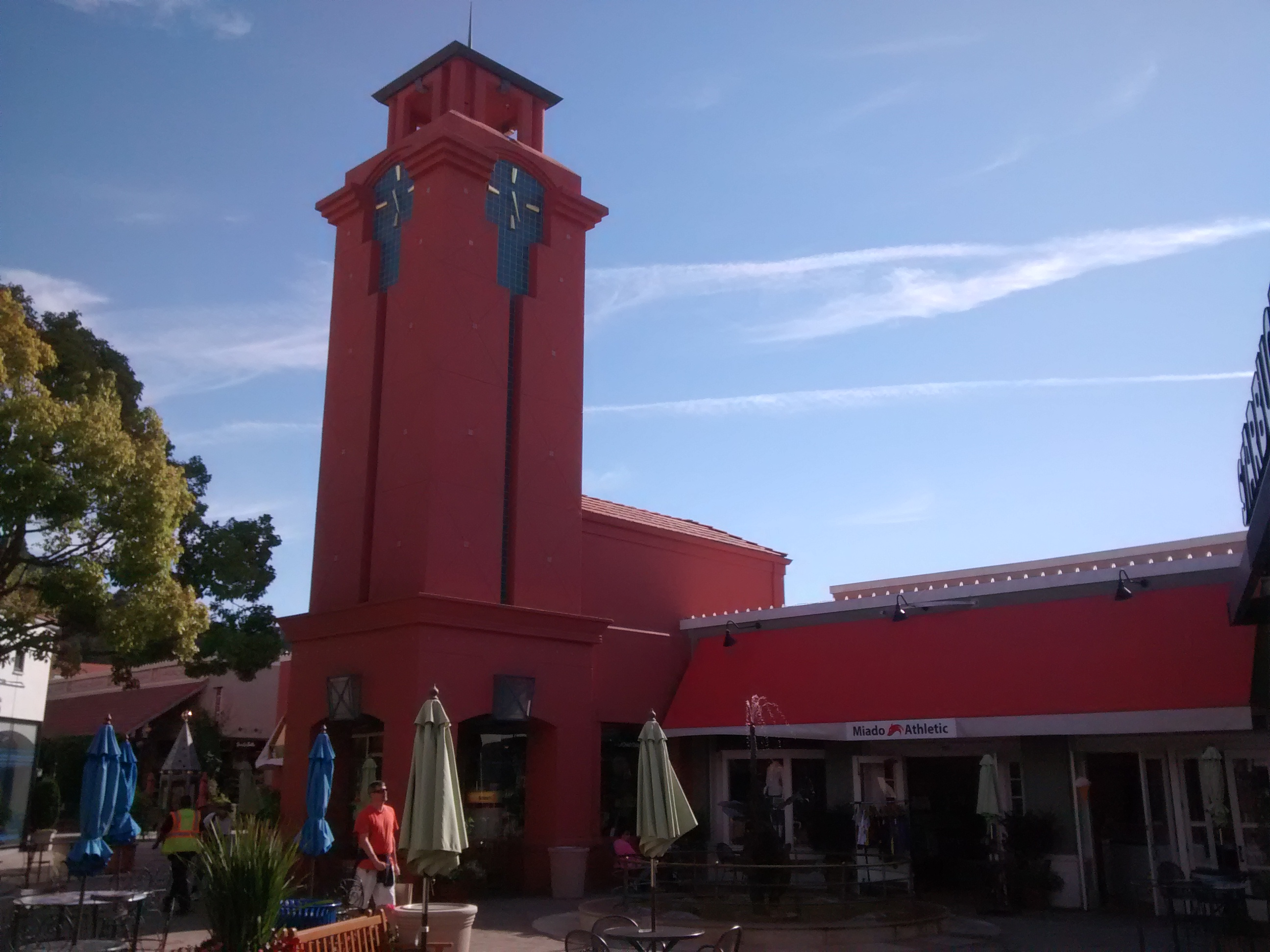
- Location: Corte Madera, California, United States
- Opened: 1958
- Manager: Colliers
- Owner: Colliers
- Num. of stores: 68
- Num. of anchor tenants: 2
- Floor area: 370,151 sq ft (34,388.2 m^{2})
- Floors: 1
- Website: shoptowncenter.com

Town Center Corte Madera is an upscale shopping center located in Corte Madera, California. It is located off U.S. Route 101 on Tamalpais Drive. It is anchored by a Safeway supermarket and Barnes & Noble. It is located across the freeway from The Village at Corte Madera and the two shopping centers provide much of the city of Corte Madera's income from retail sales tax. The Town Center is owned by 770 Tamalpais Drive, Inc. The owner of that corporation is Colliers.

== History ==
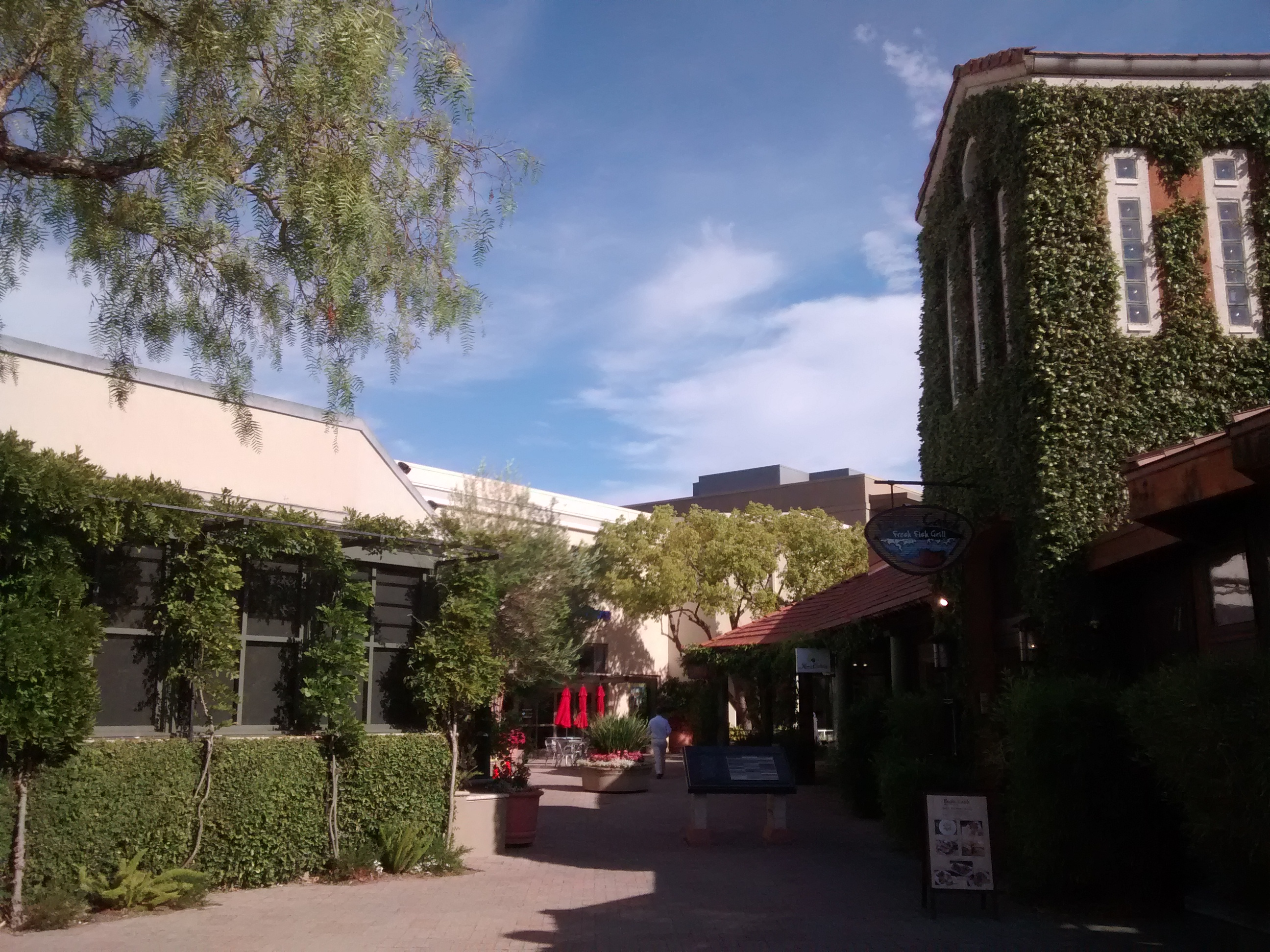
Town Center in July 2014

The Town Center at Corte Madera traces its origins to the late 1950s, serving as a successor to the original Corte Madera Center (CMC). The CMC opened in 1958, adjacent to the Littleman’s Supermarket, which had been established in 1952. During this early era, the center was home to major regional and national retailers, including J.C. Penney, Montgomery Ward, and Woolworth. One of the earliest tenants, Louis Thomas, a men’s apparel shop, opened its doors in 1958 and continues to operate at the center today, representing a direct link to the property’s mid-century beginnings.

A significant transformation occurred in the mid-1980s when the site underwent a comprehensive redevelopment. Between 1985 and 1987, the property was largely rebuilt and rebranded as the Town Center at Corte Madera. This era saw the closure of Montgomery Ward and the expansion of J.C. Penney, which added a second story to its facility. Unlike many of the enclosed "mega-malls" popular during that decade, the Town Center was designed as an open-air "lifestyle center" with meandering pedestrian pathways and dramatic architectural towers, a layout intended to take advantage of the mild Marin County climate and provide a more community-oriented atmosphere.

In recent years, the Town Center has undergone further "reimagining" to modernize its infrastructure and enhance its role as a local gathering spot. These renovations involved removing architectural barriers like enclosure walls and arcades to improve storefront visibility and pedestrian flow. The center also integrated sustainable practices, such as replacing thousands of square feet of grass with drought-tolerant landscaping and installing energy-efficient LED lighting. Today, the 370,000-square-foot complex is a mixed-use destination featuring landmark sculptures like "Ellie the Elephant" and "The Cat and the Mouse," and it is anchored by retailers such as Safeway, REI, and The Container Store.
