= OC Transpo routes =

Network of public bus and train routes in Ottawa, Ontario, Canada

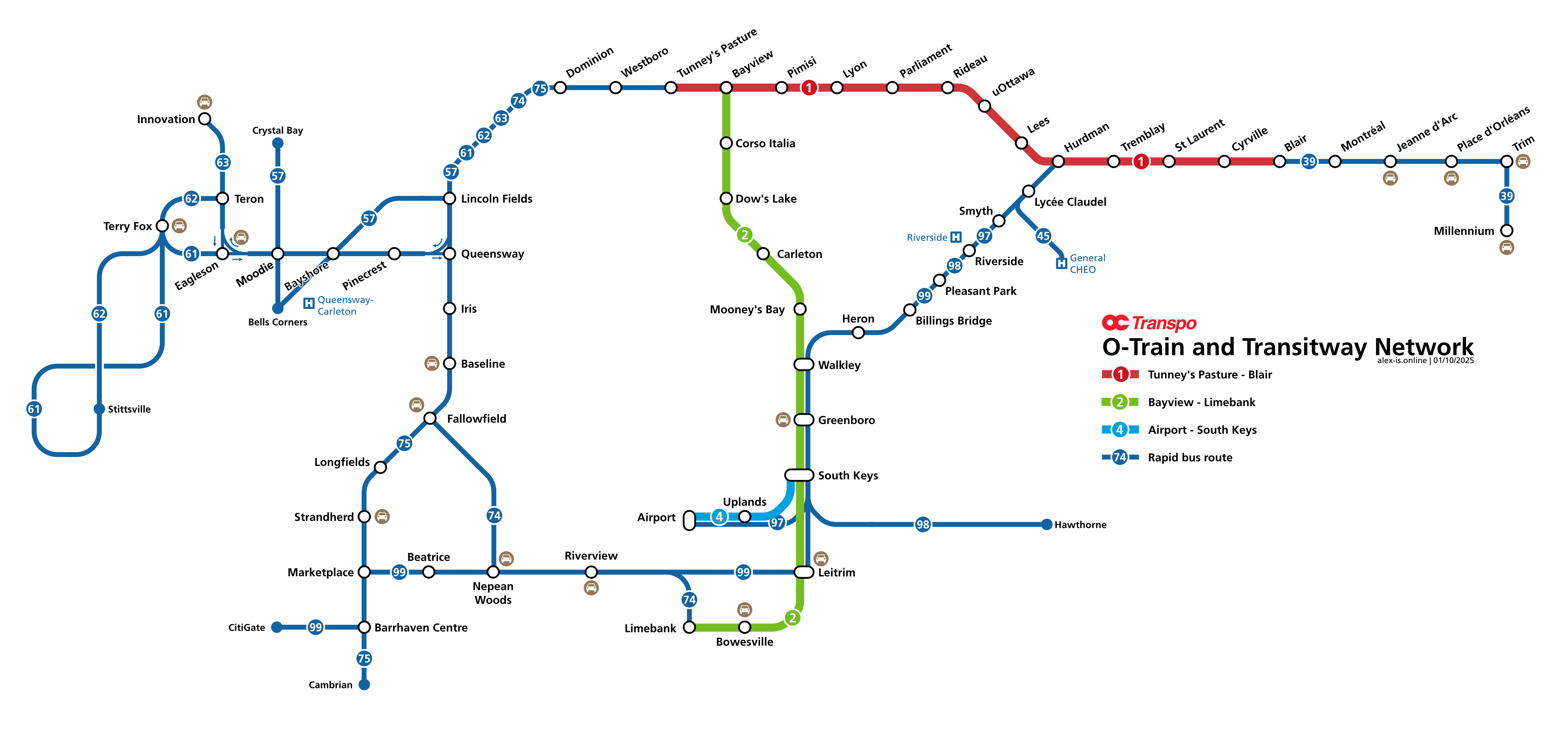
Map of O-Train and rapid routes

OC Transpo is a public transit commission that operates 170 bus routes, three light rail lines, and a paratransit system in Ottawa and the National Capital Region.

== General information ==
Line 1 (O-Train) Line 2 (O-Train) Line 3 (O-Train) Line 4 (O-Train)	O-Train: Frequent light rail service.
R1 R2 R3 R4	Rail replacement bus routes: Replaces the O-Train when out of service.
N75	Night routes: Overnight extensions of frequent routes when the O-Train is not running.
40 11	Frequent routes: Frequent routes operating every 15 minutes or less between 6:00 am and 6:00 pm on weekdays. Connects with the O-Train and most routes travel on main roads, with some routes providing service on local streets.
99 162	Local routes: Routes usually operate every 30 minutes during peak times. Routes numbered in the 100s generally do not connect to the O-Train Line 1.
275	Connexion routes: Peak-period routes connecting communities to the O-Train. Numbered in the 200s.
539	Express: Express bus routes offer faster travel times routes offer faster travel times same fare as regular service.
303; 404; 456; 622	300s: Shopper routes 400s: Event routes for the Canadian Tire Centre; 450s: Event routes for Lansdowne Park/TD Place; 600s: Intermediate school and/or secondary school routes

The last two digits of route numbers correspond to service area:

- 00s and 10s – Central
- 20s – Gloucester
- 30s – Orléans
- 40s – Alta Vista
- 50s – Ottawa West
- 60s – Kanata/Stittsville
- 70s – Barrhaven/Riverside South
- 80s – Nepean
- 90s – South Keys/Greenboro

NOTE: Routes with a white background operate during select time periods or certain days of the week only. The above is current as of April 27, 2025.

== Routes ==
Note: services updated as of April 27, 2025.

A major route overhaul and changes in the network occurred in 2025 due to the opening of Lines 2 and 4, marketed as "New Ways to Bus". Most existing routes saw changes, with some routes being taken out completely. Many new routes were also added to accommodate the changes.

#	Terminus	Terminus	Notes	Route map
Line 1 (O-Train)	Tunney's Pasture	Blair; Trim (future)	Line 1. Provides service in the downtown core and along parts of the Transitway with stations at (from west to east) Tunney's Pasture, Bayview, Pimisi (Lebreton), Lyon, Parliament, Rideau, uOttawa, Lees, Hurdman, Tremblay, St-Laurent, Cyrville and Blair. Line 1 is currently being expanded as part of the Stage 2 LRT project. Its new terminuses will be Trim station in the East and Algonquin station in the West, with the new segments opening in 2026 and 2027. Bus service from routes 57 to 75 between Tunney's Pasture and Baseline will be replaced by Line 1. West end Connexion service will be shortened from Tunney's Pasture to start/end at Baseline. Current bus service between Trim and Blair stations will be replaced by both lines 1 and 3.	
R1	Tunney's Pasture	Blair; Trim (future)	This route replaces Line 1 when the trains are out of service. Routing depends based on the extent of the closure.	Varies per closure
E1	Downtown	Blair	Express bus route from Downtown Ottawa to Blair Station. Route offers alternative from Line 1 for people commuting directly to and from Blair. Route travels from Blair Station to Downtown during AM peak and between Downtown and Blair during PM peak	
Line 2 (O-Train)	Bayview	Limebank	Line 2. If the line is shut down, it is replaced by bus route R2. This is a diesel light rail transit (DLRT) route that provides connections to the communities of Little Italy, Confederation Heights, Heron Park, Greenboro, South Keys, Leitrim, and Riverside South. It also provides a connection to Carleton University and major employment areas west of the downtown core. As part of the New Ways to Bus network change, Line 2 will replace Route 99 between South Keys and Limebank.	
R2	Bayview	Limebank	This route replaces Line 2 when the trains are out of service. Routing depends based on the extent of the closure.	Varies per closure
Line 3 (O-Train)	Moodie	Trim	Line 3 will be a new branch of Line 1 launching in 2027. Line 3 will run parallel to Line 1 from Trim station to Lincoln Fields station, then branch off towards Moodie station. This new line will replace bus service from Routes 57 to 67 between Moodie and Tunney's Pasture. West end Connexion service will be shortened from Tunney's Pasture to start/end at Moodie. Current bus service between Trim and Blair stations will be replaced by both lines 1 and 3.	
R3	Moodie	Trim	This route would replace Line 3 when the trains are out of service, after the line begins operation in 2027. Routing depends based on the extent of the closure.	Varies per closure
Line 4 (O-Train)	Airport	South Keys	Line 4 is a spur of Line 2 which provides an all-day Airport rail link to/from South Keys station. It replaced Route 97 service to/from the MacDonald Cartier International Airport.	
R4	Airport	Greenboro	This route replaces Line 4 when the trains are out of service. Routing depends based on the extent of the closure.	Varies per closure
X	Unknown - most probably Merivale Garage on Colonnade Road	Either Baseline or Tunney's Pasture; Some pictures on Google show the route serving Hurdman	Unlisted route which travels down Woodfield Road and other roads in the Tanglewood neighborhood during mid day. Route is signed as the X Special.	Unlisted route
5	Elmvale	Rideau	Travels via Riverdale, Main, and Elgin. Provides a connection to St. Paul's University. As part of the New Ways to Bus network change, this route will be extended to Elmvale, replacing route 55. Service on Riverdale will be replaced by route 18.	
6	Greenboro; 6 Greenboro via Bank; 6 Billings Bridge	Rockcliffe; 6 Rideau	Serves the communities of New Edinburgh, Lowertown, Centretown, The Glebe, Old Ottawa South, Ridgemont, and South Keys. Also serves major tourist and commercial attractions including Bank street, the ByWard Market, Rideau Centre, Parliament Hill, and Lansdowne Park/TD Place. Early-morning and late-evening service runs between Greenboro and the Rideau Centre only. Southbound early-morning trips stay on Bank Street instead of travelling via Southgate. Extra peak-period trips are provided from Billings Bridge to the Rideau Centre in the morning and the reverse in the afternoon. Extra service is provided in both directions between Billings Bridge and the Rideau Centre when special events are taking place at Lansdowne Park/TD Place.	
7	Carleton; 7 Parliament	St-Laurent; 7 Rideau	Early AM service operates between St. Laurent Station and the Rideau Centre only. Selected AM peak trips begin at the corner of Brittany / Montréal, end at the Parliament station and are signed 7 Parliament. Selected AM peak trips start at Lansdowne Park, end at the Rideau Centre, and are signed 7 Rideau. Extra service is provided between Carleton University and Rideau Centre when special events occur at TD Place Stadium. As part of the New Ways to Bus network change, this route will have its peak period service on Brittany removed and replaced by routes 17 and 20.	
8	Gatineau	Dow's Lake	Frequent service between Dow's Lake and Gatineau 7 days a week.	
9	Hurdman; 9 Beechwood	Rideau	Selected peak-period trips start/end at the corner of Crichton and Beechwood. Travels near Ottawa's baseball stadium RCGT Park, located on Coventry Road. As part of the New Ways to Bus network change, service will run east on Murray instead of Boteler, and will be extended south on Sussex and shortened on Dalhousie.	
10	Hurdman	Main	Provides a direct connection from Carleton University to downtown Ottawa. Travels via Bronson Avenue. Some northbound and southbound trips end at Carleton University. As part of the New Ways to Bus network change, this route will be extended to St. Paul's University, replacing route 16.	
11	Lincoln Fields; 11 Bayshore; 11 Tunney's Pasture	Parliament to/vers Laurier	Eastbound trips terminate downtown at Waller, Laurier & Nicholas. Serves the northern part of Nepean along Richmond Road. Also serves the communities of Westboro and Chinatown. Serves Tunney's Pasture via Holland. Travels via Queen Street downtown. Early morning trips travel between Parliament and Tunney's Pasture stations only. As part of the New Ways to Bus network change, service will be changed to run on Ambleside instead of Richmond, run on Bayswater, Scott, and Preston instead of Somerset, and run in eastbound direction on Queen, O'Connor and Slater to the Mackenzie King Bridge	
12	Tunney's Pasture	Blair	Travels between Blair and Tunney's Pasture stations via Ogilvie, Jasmine, Montréal and Rideau.	
13	Gatineau	Tunney's Pasture	Frequent peak period service between Tunney's Pasture and Gatineau.	
14	St-Laurent	Tunney's Pasture	All trips travel between St. Laurent and Tunney's Pasture stations. This is one of the only routes with all day service that do not have any shortened or extended trips in any time period on any day of the week.	
15	Blair	Parliament	Peak period trips operate between Blair station and Parliament via Bathgate, Den Haag and Montréal. Does not operate on weekends. As part of the New Ways to Bus network change, service will be shortened to end at Parliament Station instead of Gatineau, with service into Gatineau replaced by new routes 8 and 13.	
17	Wateridge	Parliament	Peak period trips operate between Wateridge and Parliament via Rideau Street, Montréal Road, St-Laurent Boulevard, Brittany Drive, Montréal Road, Wanaki Road, Mikinak Road, and Codd’s Road. Does not operate on weekends.	
18	St-Laurent	Billings Bridge	Serves the community of Overbrook, just east of downtown Ottawa. Travels near Ottawa's baseball stadium RCGT Park, located on Coventry. As part of the New Ways to Bus network change, this route will be rerouted to run from St-Laurent to Billings Bridge, with service to Parliament removed. It will also replace route 5 service on Riverdale.	
19	Hurdman; 19 St-Laurent	Parliament	Operates in the communities of Sandy Hill, Lowertown, Vanier, and the Ottawa Trainyards. No service between St. Laurent and Hurdman via Belfast and Terminal before 8:00am and after 9:00pm weekdays and Saturday, and after 7:25pm Sunday.	
20	St-Laurent	Rideau	Travels between St-Laurent and Rideau via Montfort Hospital, Montréal, and Brittany. As part of the New Ways to Bus network change, this route will be extended to Rideau Station.	
21	Blair	Canotek	Operates three trips to Canotek during the morning peak, and two trips to Blair during the afternoon peak. Travels via Ottawa Road 174 and Montréal to/from the Canotek Business Park, located in the northeastern part of Gloucester, Ontario.	
23	Blair; Rothwell Heights		Performs a one-way loop throughout the community of Rothwell Heights. Operates during peak periods and provides limited service during midday Monday–Friday only.	
24	St-Laurent; 24 Blair	Chapel Hill; 24 Blackburn Hamlet	Follows a one-way loop throughout the community of Beacon Hill North. Early-morning trips Monday–Friday end at Blair station. Weekend late evening trips start/end at Blair station. As part of the New Ways to Bus network change, this route will be extended to Chapel Hill Park & Ride via Blackburn Hamlet and Navan Road.	
25	Wateridge; 25 La Cité; 25 Blair	Millennium; 25 Blair	Travels via Trim, Innes, Blair, Bathgate, Den Haag and Carson's in Orléans and Blackburn Hamlet. Continues past Blair station to/from La Cité. Early morning and late evening trips operate between Millennium and Blair stations only. In the AM peak, some eastbound trips end at Blair station. Some selected trips get extended to the Canada Aviation and Space Museum. As part of the New Ways to Bus network change, route 25 will be extended to Wateridge Village replacing route 27, and service to the Canada Aviation and Space Museum was replaced by Local route 125.	
26	Blair; Pineview		Performs a one-way loop throughout the Pineview community Monday to Friday.	
30	Millennium	Blair	Travels via Trim, Montmère, Brian Coburn, Mer Bleue & Jeanne d'Arc. Serves the communities of Avalon, Châteauneuf, Chapel Hill North & Convent Glen in Orléans.	
31	Place d'Orléans	Tenth Line	Travels between Place d'Orléans and Tenth Line Road via Chapel Hill. Operates 7 days a week.	
32	Chapel Hill	Blair	On weekdays, all trips start/end at Chapel Hill Park & Ride. Provides limited service to Sunview on weekends. As part of the New Ways to Bus network change, this route will be rerouted to service Place d'Orléans, with service along Grey Nuns replaced by route 138.	
33	Portobello	Place d'Orléans; 33 Blair	Serves the communities of Avalon and Fallingbrook in Orléans. Travels via Portobello, Montcrest, Princess Louise and Tompkins. Midday and weekend trips are shortened to start/end at Place d'Orléans.	
34	Chapel Hill	Blair	Serves the community of Chapel Hill in Orléans and travels via Renaud, Navan, the Chapel Hill Park & Ride, Orléans Boulevard, Fortune and Jeanne d'Arc.	
35	Avalon	Blair	Operates half-hourly service all day, including late evenings and weekends. Serves the communities of Avalon and Fallingbrook in Orléans. Travels via Esprit, Gardenway, Bottriell and Charlemagne.	
36	Place d'Orléans	Innes	Runs between Place d'Orléans and Frank Bender Street via Innes Road, Jeanne d'Arc Boulevard, des Épinettes Avenue, Charlemagne Boulevard, Tenth Line Road, and St-Joseph Boulevard.	
38	Trim; 38 Place d'Orléans	Blair	Serves northern Orléans along Jeanne d'Arc. Terminates at Trim station. Peak-period trips in the peak direction do not serve Place d'Orléans station.	
39	Millennium; 39 Trim; 39 Place d'Orléans	Blair	Weekday service between Blair and Trim stations every 15 minutes and to Millennium every half hour. Peak-period trips in the peak direction do not serve Taylor Creek. On weekends, travels between Blair and Place d'Orléans every 15 minutes. Overnight extension to Rideau station numbered N39.	
N39	Trim; Place d'Orléans	Rideau	Some early weekday early morning trips do not service Trim, instead starting at Place d'Orléans. All night buses end at Rideau station. These buses only run overnight when Line 1 trains are not. They are extensions of their regular daytime route numbers to/from Rideau station.	
40	Greenboro; 40 Elmvale Acres; 40 Elmvale Acres via Industrial; 40 Conroy	St-Laurent	Serves the communities of South Keys, Greenboro, Blossom Park, and Elmvale Acres in inner-southeast Ottawa. Selected peak-period trips start and end in the Ottawa South Business Park at the corner of St. Laurent / Conroy. Many trips terminate at Elmvale Shopping Centre, with 15 minute all-day service (including weekends) between St. Laurent and Elmvale.	
41	St. Laurent	Billings Bridge	Travels between St. Laurent and Billings Bridge stations via Walkley, Heron and St. Laurent Boulevard	
42	Blair; 42 Labrie / Cyrville	Hurdman	Serves the Cyrville Industrial Park and the Ottawa Trainyards shopping area. Extra trips are provided during peak periods between Hurdman Station and the corner of Labrie / Cyrville. No service in the late evening Monday–Friday and in the evening on weekends.	
43	Karsh	Greenboro	Travels between Karsh drive and Greenboro station via Johnston and Tapiola between 6:00 AM and 12:00 AM on weekdays only. No weekend service.	
44	Billings Bridge	Hurdman	Travels via Alta Vista and the Herongate community.	
45	Hospital / Hôpital	Hurdman	Operates 24/7 between Hurdman station and the Ottawa Health Sciences Complex. Overnight extensions to Rideau numbered N45.	
N45	Hospital / Hôpital	Rideau	All night buses end at Rideau station. These buses only run overnight when Line 1 trains are not. They are extensions of their regular daytime route numbers to/from Rideau station.	
47	Hawthorne (AM)	St-Laurent (PM)	Operates during peak periods Monday–Friday only. Serves both the Ottawa and Hawthorne Industrial Parks.	
48	Carleton	Hurdman	Travels via Billings Bridge, Kilborn, Canterbury, Halifax, Walkley, and St. Laurent. Serves Canterbury High School. As part of the New Ways to Bus network change, this route will be rerouted to run from Hurdman to Carleton University, replacing route 46 between Hurdman and Walkley Road, and removing its service along the Transitway.	
49	Hurdman	Elmvale	Travels via Pleasant Park. Limited service is provided outside of peak hours Monday–Friday. Saturday service only operates from approximately 9 am to 7 pm and Sunday service only operates from approximately 9:30 am to 5:30 pm.	
51	Tunney's Pasture	Britannia	Serves Westboro Village and Britannia.	
53	Tunney's Pasture	Baseline	Serves Holland Avenue and the community of Carlington and travels to Algonquin College.	
56	Civic; King Edward	Tunney's Pasture	Operates between Tunney's Pasture and the Civic Hospital during all time periods. Extended to King Edward/Union Street during weekday peak periods and all day on weekends. Serves Lees, the Glebe community, Carling, and Holland.	
57	Carling Campus	Tunney's Pasture	Frequent service provided between Tunney's Pasture and Bayshore during most time periods. All other trips start/end at the Department of National Defense Carling Campus. Overnight extension to Rideau Station numbered N57. In September 2025, Routes 57 and 58 will operate on a combined frequency between Tunney's Pasture and Bayshore station with certain portions operating every 30 minutes.	
N57	Bayshore	Rideau	All night buses end at Rideau station. These buses only run overnight when Line 1 trains are not. They are extensions of their regular daytime route numbers to/from Rideau station.	
58	Carling Campus; 58 Carling Campus to/vers Abbott Point of Care	Tunney's Pasture; 58 Bayshore	Most trips start/end at the Department of National Defense Carling Campus. Some weekday trips are extended to the Abbot Point of Care building near Moodie station during peak periods. In September 2025, Routes 57 and 58 will operate on a combined frequency between Tunney's Pasture and Bayshore station with certain portions operating every 30 minutes.	
60	Cope	Terry Fox; 60 Tunney's Pasture	Travels between 760 Eagleson Road (Real Canadian Superstore) and Terry Fox stations via Eagleson Road, Romina Street, Fernbank Road, Terry Fox Drive, Castlefrank Road, Kanata Avenue, and Lord Byng Way. Peak trips are extended to Tunney's Pasture and skip Terry Fox station.	
61	Stittsville via Terry Fox; 61 Terry Fox	Tunney's Pasture	This route serves Kanata and Stittsville during all time periods providing residents with a connection to Line 1. Early morning trips travel via Pinecrest Garage on Queensview.	
N61	Terry Fox	Rideau	All night buses end at Rideau station. These buses only run overnight when Line 1 trains are not. They are extensions of their regular daytime route numbers to/from Rideau station.	
62	Stittsville; 62 Terry Fox	Tunney's Pasture	Before noon on weekdays eastbound buses travel within Stittsville via Fringewood between Abbott E. and Hazeldean, while westbound buses travel via Iber. After noon on weekdays, buses follow the reverse direction on both roads. Serves Pimisi on Canada Day for customers with accessibility needs. As part of the New Ways to Bus network change, this route will be modified to run on Campeau instead of Palladium, with service on Castlefrank, Katimavik, Palladium and Cyclone Taylor replaced by route 162.	
63	Briarbrook via Innovation	Tunney's Pasture via Briarbrook	Serves the community of Briarbrook in north Kanata, the Kanata North Business Park, and travels via Highway 417 and the Transitway. As part of the New Ways to Bus network change, some service in Briarbrook will be replaced by route 110, and service to Gatineau from Tunney's Pasture will be replaced by new route 13. AM peak: Eastbound buses travel via March between Terry Fox and Carling. Westbound buses travel from Tunney's Pasture to Innovation via Carling, Schneider, Legget, and Terry Fox. Some trips end at the corner of Legget / Terry Fox. Some trips also operate from Eagleson to Innovation via Carling, Schneider, Legget, and Terry Fox. PM peak: Eastbound buses travel from Innovation via Carling, Schneider, Legget, and Terry Fox. Some trips start at Legget / Terry Fox.	
66	Innovation	Tunney's Pasture	Operates during peak-periods Monday–Friday only. Travels via the Transitway, Highway 417, Moodie, Carling Avenue, and the Kanata North Business Park. As part of the New Ways to Bus network change, service to Gatineau from Tunney's Pasture will be replaced by new route 13. Service on Leggett and Solandt will also be removed.	
67	Cope	Terry Fox; 67 Tunney's Pasture	Serves the Blackstone neighborhood via Rouncey Road and Cope Drive. Select peak trips are extended to/from Tunney's Pasture station bypassing Terry Fox station.	
68	Terry Fox	Baseline	Travels between Terry Fox and Baseline stations. Serves Algonquin College, Queensway Carleton Hospital, Bells Corners, Hazeldean and Kanata Centrum.	
70	Fallowfield	Limebank	Travels via Earl Armstrong, Strandherd, Woodroffe, Stoneway, Queensbury, Berrigan, Tartan, CitiGate, Cedarview and Flanders. Provides a connection between Barrhaven west and O-Train Line 2.	
73	Fallowfield; 73 Tunney's Pasture	Limebank	Operates all day between Fallowfield and Limebank station with peak period service extended to Tunney's Pasture albeit in the opposite direction of the connexion routes. All peak trips serve the RCMP headquarters. Route 73 does not run on weekends.	
74	Limebank	Tunney's Pasture; 74 Fallowfield	Early morning and late evening service operates between Fallowfield station and Limebank station only. Service between Fallowfield and Tunney's Pasture ends at 6 pm on Sundays.	
75	Cambrian; 75 Barrhaven Centre	Tunney's Pasture	Provides 24/7 service between Tunney's Pasture and Barrhaven along the central and southwest Transitway. Trips may terminate at Barrhaven Centre, especially during late evenings, the counter-peak direction during weekdays or weekends. Overnight extension to Rideau Station numbered N75. As part of the New Ways to Bus network change, service to Gatineau has been replaced by new route 13. Has also been extended south to run on Cappamore.	
N75	Barrhaven Centre	Rideau	All night buses end at Rideau station. These buses only run overnight when Line 1 trains are not. They are extensions of their regular daytime route numbers to/from Rideau station.	
80	Tunney's Pasture 80 Tunney's Pasture via Westgate	Barrhaven Centre 80 Barrhaven Centre via Westgate	Travels via Holland, Merivale, Leikin, and Crestway. Early morning southbound trips travel via Colonnade Road. Some trips do not enter the Westgate Shopping Centre. Selected peak-period trips start/end at the corner of Merivale and Slack and are signed 80 MacFarlane, these trips do not enter the Westage Shopping Centre. As part of the New Ways to Bus network change, service on Beatrice and Chapman Mills will be removed, and trips to Auriga, Antares, Deakin, MacFarlane will be replaced by route 86 and new route 117.	
81	Tunney's Pasture	Bayshore	Southbound trips do not enter Westgate Shopping Centre during the afternoon peak, and northbound trips do not enter Westgate Shopping Centre during the morning peak. As part of the New Ways to Bus network change, this route will be extended to Baseline Station, with new service in the Westboro area replacing route 16. Service within the Westgate S.S. will be removed.	
82	Lincoln Fields; 82 Tunney's Pasture	Baseline	Extended both directions to Tunney's Pasture during weekday peak hours. Buses enter Pinecrest Shopping Centre during business hours only.	
84	Baseline; Centrepointe		Operates during peak periods in a one-way loop from Tallwood via Centrepointe, Hemmingwood and Centrepointe, return to Tallwood. Service was truncated from Tunney's Pasture to Baseline in preparation for the launch of the extension of Line 1 to Algonquin in 2027.	
85	Bayshore	Lees	Travels via Carling Avenue. Connection to the O-Train Line 2 at Dow's Lake station and O-Train Line 1 at Lees station.	
86	Tunney's Pasture	Antares (signed as Auriga/Deakin)	Travels via Holland, Fisher, Prince of Wales and Antares Drive.	
87	Tunney's Pasture	Baseline	Some early morning trips terminate at the Carlingwood Mall. Travels via Woodroffe and Carlingwood Mall between John A. MacDonald Parkway and Baseline station. Sunday service operates when the Carlingwood mall is open, from around 10:30 am to 7:30 pm.	
88	Bayshore; 88 Baseline	Hurdman	Serves Billings Bridge, Mooney's Bay, Baseline Road, Algonquin College, Queensway Carleton Hospital, and Bayshore Shopping Centre. It also provides a connection to Line 1 at Hurdman as well as a connection to Line 2 at Mooney's Bay.	
90	Greenboro	Hurdman	Travels via southern Transitway, Data Centre, Heron, Canada Post, Riverside, Uplands, Downpatrick, and Hunt Club.	
92	Greenboro	Walkley; Hurdman	Serves the communities of Riverside Park and Riverside-Hunt Club with service ending at Walkley Station, and peak period service extending to Hurdman Station. No service on the weekends	
93	Leitrim	Rotary	Serves the community of Findlay Creek in the south end of Gloucester. One extra Sunday trip is provided to and from the Hindu Temple, located on Bank Street, just north of Blais Road.	
94	Leitrim	Dun Skipper	Serves Findlay Creek along Kelly Farm Drive during peak periods.	
98	Hawthorne; 98 South Keys	Hurdman	Serves the Greenboro and South Keys neighbourhoods in South Ottawa as well as the stations along the southeast transitway. Additional trips travel between Hurdman and South Keys stations only.	
99	Barrhaven Centre; 99 Barrhaven Centre via Weybridge; 99 Pierre-de-Blois; 99 Riverview	Limebank; 99 St. Francis Xavier	Select trips extend from Barrhaven Centre to Weybridge Drive. School trips serve St. Francis Xavier High School and Pierre De Blois. School trips serving St. Francis Xavier High School travel between the school and Riverview stations only. Most trips do not serve Riverview station and travel via Borbridge and Spratt instead.	
105	Airport	St-Laurent	New 24 hour bus route traveling along the Transitway between the Airport and St. Laurent stations.	
110	Innovation; 110 CitiGate	Limebank; 110 CitiGate; 110 Hurdman; 110 Earl of March	Serves the Amazon fullfilment Centre in Barrhaven. Select early morning trips which operate before the start of O-Train Line 2 service travel between CitiGate and Hurdman and serve Bowesville, Leitrim, South Keys, Greenboro, Walkley, Heron, Billings Bridge, Pleasant Park, Smyth and Lycee Claudel stations. School trips serving Earl of March Secondary School travel between Teron and Innovation stations only.	
111	Carleton; 111 Billings Bridge; 111 St. Pius X H.S.	Baseline	Serves the communities of Carleton Heights and Parkwood Hills in Nepean. Does not continue through to Carleton University from Billings Bridge during weekends.	
112	Billings Bridge	Baseline	Travels between Billings Bridge and Algonquin College via Heron, Prince of Wales, Fisher, Viewmount and Meadowlands.	
116	Greenboro	Baseline	Travels along West Hunt Club road between the Transitway and Woodroffe Avenue. Provides an all day 7 days a week connection to O-Train Line 2.	
117	Greenboro	Baseline	Travels between Baseline and Greenboro stations via Hunt Club Antares, MacFarlane, Merivale, Slack, Vaan and Woodroffe during peak periods only.	
138	Place d'Orléans	Hiawatha	Travels between Place d'Orléans and the St. Louis Residence via St. Joseph and Jeanne d'Arc.	
139	Place d'Orléans	Petrie Island	Operates on summer weekends only.	
153	Lincoln Fields	Carlingwood Mall	Provides limited service all day.	
158	Bayshore	Haanel	Operates during peak-periods Monday–Friday, with 2 trips/direction/day. Terminus is at the Canmet complex, on Haanel Drive.	
161	Terry Fox	Bridlewood	Only operates Monday–Friday. Serves the communities of Katimavik-Hazeldean, Glen Cairn, and Bridlewood. As part of the New Ways to Bus network change, service south of Rothesay Drive will be removed, and service north of Hazeldean Mall will be rerouted to provide service to the Beaverbrook and Kanata Lake areas.	
162	Terry Fox	Canadian Tire Centre	Provides connections to the Canadian Tire Centre and the Tanger Outlet Mall in west Kanata. As part of the New Ways to Bus network change, this route will be changed to provide service between Terry Fox and Campeau Drive only. The existing service to Fernbank via West Ridge will be replaced by route 262, with service on Hazeldean, Huntmar and Palladium replaced by routes 261, 263 and 266.	
163	Terry Fox	Kittawake	Runs between Terry Fox Station and Carp Road / Kittiwake Drive via Castlefrank Road and Abbott Street East. It replaced route 261 along Stittsville Main Street and Abbott Street.	
165	Innovation	Terry Fox	Operates during selected time periods only Monday–Friday. Serves the communities of Huntsville, Morgan's Grant, and Briarbrook. As part of the New Ways to Bus network change, this route will be rerouted to only run along Terry Fox, Huntsville, Katimavik and Kanata with more local service in Morgan's Grant and Kanata Lakes removed.	
168	Terry Fox; 168 Terry Fox via Castlefrank	Bridlewood; 168 Bridlewood via Castlefrank	Serves the communities of Kanata Lakes, Beaverbrook, and Bridlewood. Buses do not travel along Eagleson between Abbeyhill and Rothesay on the weekends, but instead travel through the Glen Cairn community. As part of the New Ways to Bus network change, service on Goldridge is replaced by route 265, and service north of Campeau and Glen Carin is replaced by route 161.	
173	Barrhaven Centre	CitiGate	Provides all day service between Barrhaven Centre and CitiGate. Overlaps with Route 75 between Barrhaven Centre and Fallowfield stations.	
187	Baseline (AM)	Amberwood (PM)	Operates towards Baseline station during the morning peak, and the reverse to Amberwood (Merivale/Slack) during the afternoon peak. Buses travel via Woodroffe, Grenfell, Pratt, Burnbank, Slack, Merivale, and Amberwood.	
189	Baseline	Colonnade	Travels via Meadowlands, Chesterton, Viewmount, and Merivale.	
197	Uplands; Greenboro		Operates in a one-way loop through CFB Uplands. Serves the EY Centre and CFS Uplands. Does not enter the EY Centre before noon Monday–Friday or operate in the late evenings Monday–Friday. Only operates from approximately 9 am to 7 pm on weekends. As part of the New Ways to Bus network change, this route will connect to both Uplands and Airport stations, and service on Research will be removed.	
198	Greenboro	Limebank	Operates during peak periods Monday–Friday only. Buses travel via Hunt Club and River. Selected morning trips start at River and Hunt Club. Selected afternoon trips end at River and Mulligan. Select trips start/end at Borbridge / Southbridge. As part of the New Ways to Bus network change, this route will be extended to Limebank Station.	
#	End (AM) Start (PM)	Start (AM) End (PM)	Notes	Route map
221	Blair	Cumberland	Serves the village of Cumberland, R.J. Kennedy Arena, Cardinal Creek Village, Trim station, and Place d'Orléans station. AM Peak: Serves Place d'Orléans Park & Ride instead of the station.	
222	Blair	Vars	Serves the rural community of Carlsbad Springs. Buses travel via Blair, Innes and Anderson.	
226	Blair	Chapel Hill		
228	Blair	Navan; Sarsfield	Serves the rural communities of Sarsfield, Navan, and Notre-Dame-des-Champs, as well as the Chapel Hill Park & Ride.	
234	Blair	Tenth Line	Serves the communities of Queenswood Heights, Chaperal and Avalon in Orléans. AM Peak: Serves Place d'Orléans Park & Ride instead of the station. As part of the New Ways to Bus network change, this route will be rerouted to along Jerome Jodoin to Décoeur, with service ending on Harvest Valley. It will also replace route 37 service.	
237	Blair	Place d'Orléans	Serves the community of Convent Glen North in Orléans.	
256	Tunney's Pasture	Bridlewood	Serves the communities of Bridlewood and Bells Corners. AM Peak: Full service is provided at Bayshore and Pinecrest stations. Passengers may get off the bus at Queensway, Lincoln Fields, Dominion, and Westboro stations, but cannot board. PM Peak: Skips Westboro, Dominion, Lincoln Fields, and Pinecrest stations. Bypasses Queensway Station. Extended to serve Bridlewood Trails along Akerson on December 24, 2017. As part of the New Ways to Bus network change, this route will be rerouted to run on Steeple Chase, Bridlewood, Summitview, Summergaze, Meadowbreeze and Crownridge, with service on Akerson, Stonehaven and Grassy Plains between Summitview and Crownridge, and Stonehaven between Bridlewood and Bridgestone will be removed.	
261	Tunney's Pasture	Stittsville Main	Serves Canadian Tire Centre Station on request only. Travels via Stittsville Main instead of West Ridge. Extended north along Stittsville Main to/from Maple Grove, providing improved service to new residents. AM Peak: Full service is provided at Bayshore and Pinecrest stations. Passengers may get off the bus at Queensway, Lincoln Fields, Dominion, and Westboro stations, but cannot board. PM Peak: Skips Westboro, Dominion, Lincoln Fields, and Pinecrest stations. Bypasses Queensway Station. As part of the New Ways to Bus network change, this route will be rerouted to run on Hazeldean to provide service to Kimpton/Lloydalex via Kimpton and Stittsville Main. Existing service on Stittsville Main north of Kimpton is removed, service on Stittsville Main between Abbott and Hazeldean is replaced by routes 163 and 263, and service on Fringewood and Granite Ridge is replaced by new route 266.	
262	Tunney's Pasture	West Ridge	Travels via Fernbank, West Ridge, Kittiwake, and Carp in Stittsville. AM Peak: Provides full service at Bayshore and Pinecrest stations. Passengers may get off the bus at Queensway, Lincoln Fields, Dominion, and Westboro stations, but cannot board. PM Peak: Skips Westboro, Dominion, Lincoln Fields, and Pincrest stations. Bypasses Queensway Station.	
263	Tunney's Pasture	Richmond	Serves the community of Stanley Corners and the rural community of Richmond, both are located just south of Stittsville. Serves Canadian Tire Centre Station on request only. AM Peak: Provides full service at Bayshore and Pinecrest stations. Passengers may get off the bus at Queensway, Lincoln Fields, Dominion, and Westboro stations, but cannot board. PM Peak: Skips Westboro, Dominion, Lincoln Fields, and Pinecrest stations. Bypasses Queensway Station. As part of the New Ways to Bus network change, this route will be extended to Richmond, with service on Springbrook, Trailway, Hedgerow, Beechfern and Wintergreen is replaced by new route 266.	
265	Tunney's Pasture	Beaverbrook	Travels in a one-way loop through the community of Beaverbrook. AM Peak: Provides full service at Eagleson, Bayshore, and Pinecrest stations. Passengers may get off the bus at Queensway, Lincoln Fields, Dominion, and Westboro stations, but cannot board. PM Peak: Skips Westboro, Dominion, Lincoln Fields, and Pinecrest stations. Bypasses Queensway and Eagleson stations. As part of the New Ways to Bus network change, this route will replace route 165 on Goldridge and Kanata, and replace route 268 on Weslock, Walden and each of March. Service on Knudson and Campeau is removed.	
266	Tunney's Pasture	Springbrook	Runs between Springbrook Drive and Tunney's Pasture Station.	
275	Tunney's Pasture	Half Moon Bay	Serves the Golflinks and Half Moon Bay communities during peak periods. AM Peak: Passengers may get off the bus at any station between Baseline and Westboro stations, but cannot board. PM Peak: Skips Westboro, Dominion, Lincoln Fields, Queensway, and Iris stations, with full service provided at Baseline station.	
277	Tunney's Pasture	Nepean Woods	Serves the community of Chapman Mills in Barrhaven. AM Peak: Passengers may get off the bus at any station between Baseline and Westboro stations, but cannot board. PM Peak: Skips Westboro, Dominion, Lincoln Fields, Queensway, and Iris stations, with full service provided at Baseline station.	
279	Tunney's Pasture	Manotick	AM Peak: Passengers may get off the bus at any station between Baseline and Westboro stations, but cannot board. PM Peak: Skips Westboro, Dominion, Lincoln Fields, Queensway, and Iris stations, with full service provided at Baseline station. Operates during peak periods only. Buses travel between the Manotick Arena and Tunney's Pasture stations.	
283	Limebank	Richmond; Munster Hamlet; Stittsville	Serves the rural communities of Richmond and Munster Hamlet. Starts/ends near the corner of McBean / Perth. Selected trips are extended to/from Munster Hamlet via Franktown and Munster. These trips start/end near the corner of Munster Side / Flewellyn.	
294	Greenboro	Lester	Serves Barrett Lands, Deerfield Village and Findlay Creek. As part of the New Ways to Bus network change, this route will shortened to run between Greenboro Station and Lester Road.	
299	Limebank	Manotick	Serves the village of Manotick during peak periods. Travels between Limebank station and Manotick.	
#	Rural terminus	Urban terminus	Rural communities served	Route map
301	Royal York / King	Carlingwood	Richmond, Stittsville	
302	Cameron / Sparkle	St-Laurent	Cumberland, Sarsfield, Navan, Notre-Dame-des-Champs	
303	Porcupine / Cricket	Carlingwood	Dunrobin, Carp	
304	Osgoode / Logan Farm	Billings Bridge	Metcalfe, Greely, Osgoode	
305	Fourth Line / Andrew	Carlingwood	Kars, North Gower, Manotick	
Route	Terminus	Stadium/Event	Notes	Route map
404	Tunney's Pasture	Canadian Tire Centre	Extended to/from Tunney's Pasture Station to provide a connection to/from line 1.	
405	Trim	Canadian Tire Centre	Also serves Place d'Orléans, Jeanne d'Arc and Montréal Road.	
406	Limebank	Canadian Tire Centre	Extended to serve Limebank via Earl Armstrong Road, Nepean Woods and Beatrice. Also serves the southwest Transitway. Travels via Woodroffe northbound between Iris and Highway 417.	
450	Rideau	TD Place Stadium	Travels via Rideau Street and Bank Street to supplement route 6 and route 7.	
451	Blair	TD Place Stadium	Travels via the east Transitway, the southeast Transitway between Billings Bridge and Hurdman, and Bank Street.	
452	South Keys	TD Place Stadium	Serves the southeast Transitway between South Keys and Billings Bridge, as well as Bank Street.	
454	Terry Fox	TD Place Stadium	Travels via the west Transitway between Terry Fox and Queensway, as well as Bank Street.	
455	Trim	TD Place Stadium	Serves Trim, Place d'Orléans, and Jeanne d'Arc, as well as Bank Street.	
456	Barrhaven Centre	TD Place Stadium	Travels via the southwest Transitway between Barrhaven Centre and Baseline, as well as Baseline Road and Bank Street.	
505	Billings Bridge or Hurdman	Winterlude	Operates during the first three weekends of February during the Winterlude festival only, signed as OLG Sno-Bus, free of charge	

=== School trips ===
These trips provide service to/from various middle and high school for students enrolled in such schools.

Route	School(s)	Start (AM) End (PM)	Notes	School Service Map (PDF)
18	Immaculata High School	Billings Bridge	PM service only.	
14	Adult High School	Rideau	PM service only.	
15	Collège catholique Samuel-Genest; Gloucester High School	Rideau	PM service only. Temporary school route replacing route 12 trips until Montréal Road construction is complete.	
10	Immaculata High School	Mackenzie King		
24	Colonel By Secondary School; Gloucester High School	Blair St-Laurent	Shortened to start and end at either Blair station and/or St.Laurent station respectively.	
26	Lester B. Pearson Catholic High School	Meadowbrook / Blair	Travels via City Park Drive East between Blair station and Ogilvie Road.	
621	Lester B. Pearson Catholic High School	Innes / Tauvette		
628	École secondaire Louis-Riel	Blair	Via Highway 417.	
621	Colonel By Secondary School; Gloucester High School	Innes / Tauvette	Travels via the Transitway, Blair station, Gloucester Centre mall roadway, Blair Road, and Ogilvie Road.	
30	École secondaire Gisèle-Lalonde	Jeanne d'Arc / Grey Nuns		
33	École secondaire Gisèle-Lalonde	Place d'Orléans		
33	St. Peter High School	Portobello / Summer Sky	Buses follow the pattern through the Portobello Loop. PM only.	
33	Colonel By Secondary School; Gloucester High School	Lakeridge / Vistapark	Travels via the Transitway, Blair station, Gloucester Centre mall roadway, Blair Road, and Ogilvie Road.	
35	École secondaire Gisèle-Lalonde	Place d'Orléans		
35	Cairine Wilson Secondary School	Lakeridge / Vistapark		
35	École secondaire Béatrice-Desloges	Place d'Orléans		
35	St. Peter High School	Lakeridge / Vistapark		
38	St. Matthew High School	Trim station		
40	South Keys	Blossom Park	Slightly different from regular trips as these trips go along Bank, Sixth and Athans and terminate at South Keys. Serves as a connection to O-Train Line 2 for students taking the 693 to St. Francis Xavier High School. Signed as the "40 Blossom Park".	
647	Canterbury High School	Hurdman		
51	Nepean High School; Broadview Public School	Lincoln Fields	PM service only.	
67	Holy Trinity High School	Cope	PM service only.	
679	St. Joseph High School	Cobble Hill		
80	Longfields-Davidson Heights Secondary School; Merivale High School	Leikin / Bill Leathern; Barrhaven Centre; Riverside South; Tunney's Pasture		
85	Notre Dame High School; Glebe Collegiate Institute; Nepean High School	Bayshore; Preston / Gladstone	PM service only. The trip to Preston / Gladstone from Notre Dame is signed as the 85 Little Italy. The trips from Glebe Collegiate Institute are signed as 85 Bayshore via Carling.	
111	St. Pius X High School	Baseline		
88	Bell High School; St. Paul High School	Baseline; Bayshore		
646	Canterbury High School	Terry Fox		
90	St. Patrick's High School	Uplands / Bowesville		
92	St. Patrick's High School	Walkley	Trips start and end at Heron / Alta Vista and Walkley Station. Travels via Hunt Club.	
697	Ridgemont High School	Leitrim		
617	École secondaire Omer-Deslauriers	Hurdman		
99	École secondaire publique Pierre-de-Blois; St. Francis Xavier High School	Limebank; Riverview	Trips serving St. Francis Xavier High School terminate at Riverview while trips serving Pierre de Blois are extensions from Barrhaven Centre.	
110	A.Y. Jackson Secondary School PM Only; Earl of March Secondary School	Stonehaven PM Only; Innovation	PM service only. These trips start at Hazeldean Mall and end at Stonehaven/Summitview and are signed as the 110 Stonehaven. Both AM and PM service are provided for Earl of March Secondary School.	
610	St. Pius X High School	Baseline	Travels via Viewmount	
33	St. Peter High School	Place d'Orléans		
36	St. Peter High School	Jeanne d'Arc / Innes		
35	St. Matthew High School	Des Épinettes / Tenth Line		
657	A.Y. Jackson Secondary School	Bridlewood	AM trips start at the corner of Stonehaven/Bridlewood before serving Steeple Chase. PM trips end at the corner of Steeple Chase/Spruce Meadows after serving Steeple Chase. Buses travel via Romina, Fernbank, Terry Fox, and Cope between Eagleson and Bridgestone.	
161	Earl of March Secondary School	Hazeldean		
663	Earl of March Secondary School	Terry Fox	Revised to travel via Keyrock Drive within Kanata Lakes, as opposed to Kanata.	
677	St. Joseph High School	Larkin		
673	Longfields-Davidson Heights Secondary School; École secondaire publique Pierre-de-Blois	Fallowfield		
175	Longfields-Davidson Heights Secondary School	Golflinks		
221	St. Matthew High School	Cardinal Creek	PM Service Only. Starts at Place D'Orleans station.	
299	St. Francis Xavier High School	River/Borbridge	Serves the community of Riverside South. PM Service only	
602	École secondaire De La Salle	Rideau		
609	École secondaire De La Salle	Hurdman station		
611	École secondaire Gisèle-Lalonde	Youville / St. Joseph	Serves Chapel Hill along Forest Valley, Meadowglen, Boyer, and Viseneau, as well as Innes.	
612	École secondaire Gisèle-Lalonde; École secondaire Béatrice-Desloges	Renaud / Saddleridge	Trips to/from Gisèle-Lalonde start/end near the corner of Millennium & Trim. Trips to/from Béatrices-Desloges start/end near the corner of Innes & Provence. Travels via Innes, Orléans, Longleaf, Creek Crossing, Pagé, Renaud, Joshua, and Saddleridge. Due to the closure of Pagé at Brian Coburn, buses no longer travel on Pagé north of Navan. Buses now travel via Innes, Orléans, Longleaf, Navan, Pagé (southbound only between Navan and Renaud), Renaud, Joshua, and Saddleridge.	
613	Immaculata High School	Hurdman	Travels via Main, Smyth, Riverside station, Riverside, and the southeast Transitway to Hurdman station. Operates during PM only.	
615	Collège catholique Samuel-Genest; Gloucester High School	Rideau	PM service only. Temporary school route replacing route 12 trips until Montréal Road construction is complete.	
616	Collège catholique Samuel-Genest; Gloucester High School	Rideau	PM service only. Temporary school route replacing route 12 trips until Montréal Road construction is complete.	
618	École secondaire Louis-Riel	Millennium	Serves Bearbrook, St. Joseph, Jeanne d'Arc, Mer Bleue, Brian Coburn, and Trim.	
619	École secondaire Louis-Riel	Blair	Serves Bearbrook, St. Joseph, Montréal, Ogilvie, and Blair. Buses travel via the east Transitway, Blair station, the Gloucester Centre mall roadway, Blair, and Ogilvie.	
620	Ottawa Technical Secondary School	St-Laurent		
622	Colonel By Secondary School; Lester B. Pearson High School	Renaud / Saddleridge		
624	Gloucester High School	Rideau		
630	Colonel By Secondary School; Gloucester High School	Millennium	Travels via the Transitway, Blair station, Gloucester Centre, Blair Road, and Ogilvie Road.	
631	Colonel By Secondary School; Gloucester High School	Jeanne d'Arc / Innes		
632	École secondaire Gisèle-Lalonde	Queenswood Heights	Serves Millennium, Trim, Innes, Du Grand Bois, Prestwick, Tompkins, Chartrand, Duford, and St. Joseph.	
633	Lester B. Pearson Catholic High School	St-Laurent	Serves Ogilvie, Bathgate, Plumber, Charlton, Matheson, and St. Laurent. From St-Laurent Station, buses travel via St. Laurent, Ogilvie, Cyrville, and Cummings back to Ogilvie, and continue its regular routing via the community of Carson Grove.	
634	Collège catholique Mer-Bleue	Place d'Orléans	Serves Collège catholique Mer-Bleue on Renaud Road.	
635	Cairine Wilson Secondary School	Orléans / Innes		
636	Sir Wilfrid Laurier Secondary School	Place d'Orléans		
638	St. Mathew High School	Place d'Orléans		
639	École secondaire Gisèle-Lalonde	Place d'Orléans		
640	Brookfield High School	Greenboro	Serves Uplands, Paul Anka, McCarthy, Plante, Walkley, Springfield, and Flannery. Operates with one AM trip and two PM trips.	
641	École secondaire Louis-Riel	Renaud / Compass	Serves Blackburn Hamlet, Navan, Renaud, Saddleridge, Pagé, Innes, Viseneau, and Meadowglen. Due to the closure of Pagé at Brian Coburn, buses no longer travel on Pagé north of Navan. Buses now travel via Innes, Orléans, Longleaf, Navan, Pagé (southbound only between Navan and Renaud), Renaud, Joshua, and Saddleridge.	
644	Canterbury High School	Greenboro	In the morning, buses travel from Greenboro Station via the southeast Transitway, Hunt Club, Albion, Cahill, Lorry Greenberg, Karsh, Blohm, Johnston, Conroy, Walkley, and Halifax to Canterbury High School. Buses follow the reverse routing in the afternoon.	
645	École secondaire Franco-Cité	Hurdman	Travels via Smyth. PM only.	
648	École secondaire Louis-Riel	Youville / St. Joseph	Serves Orléans, Meadowglen, and Forest Valley. Due to the closure of Pagé at Brian Coburn, buses no longer travel on Pagé north of Navan. Buses now travel via Innes, Orléans, Longleaf, Navan, Pagé (southbound only between Navan and Renaud), Renaud, Joshua, and Saddleridge.	
649	Hillcrest High School	Greenboro	In the morning, buses start at Greenboro Station, travel via the southeast Transitway, Hunt Club, Albion, Cahill, Lorry Greenberg, Karsh, Blohm, Johnston, Conroy, Walkley, Halifax, Canterbury, Haig, and Dauphin to Hillcrest. Buses follow the reverse routing in the afternoon.	
658	Bell High School	Grandview	Replaces route 152 school trips from Hastings St. to Bell High School.	
660	Bell High School	Innovation	Serves the communities of Morgan's Grant and Briarbrook before travelling via Teron, Highway 417, Holly Acres, Robertson, Baseline and Cedarview to/from the school.	
661	Bell High School	Terry Fox	Serves Kanata Lakes, Teron station, Eagleson station, Richmond, and Robertson. Buses travel via Keyrock within Kanata Lakes, as opposed to Kanata.	
665	Bell High School	Bridlewood	Also serves Eagleson, Hazeldean Mall, Robertson, Westcliffe, Seyton, Old Richmond, Lynhar, and Northside. AM trips start at the corner of Stonehaven/Bridgestone before serving Stonehaven and Grassy Plains. PM trips end at the corner of Stonehaven/Steeple Chase after serving Stonehaven and Grassy Plains. Schedules for PM trips from Franco-Ouest are not available online.	
669	Bell High School	Bayshore	Serves Baseline, Richmond, Holly Acres, Bayshore Station, Woodridge, and Bayshore.	
670	St. Pius X High School	Vaan / Woodroffe	Also serves Slack, Burnbank, Grenfell, Merivale, MacFarlane, Deakin, and Prince of Wales. AM trips travel via Meadowlands and Fisher. PM trips travel via Fisher, Baseline, and Prince of Wales.	
674	All Saints Catholic High School; Stephen Leacock Public School	Innovation	Serves Morgan's Grant, Brookside, March Road, Teron, Beaverbrook, Weslock, Knudson, and Kanata.	
675	Bell High School; Collège catholique Franco-Ouest	Cambrian	Schedules for PM trips from Franco-Ouest are not available online.	
678	École secondaire Louis-Riel	Jeanne d'Arc station	Serves Bearbrook, St. Joseph, Champlain, and Jeanne d'Arc.	
680	Merivale High School	Barrhaven Centre; Riverside South; Tunney's Pasture		
681	Bell High School	Bridlewood	AM trips start at the corner of Stonehaven/Bridlewood before serving Steeple Chase. AM Only.	
682	Cedarview Middle School	Fallowfield		
683	Cedarview Middle School	Half Moon Bay		
686	École secondaire Omer-Deslauriers	Baseline	Replaces route 86 trips.	
688	Merivale High School	Terry Fox	Replaces Route 88 trips.	
689	École secondaire Omer-Deslauriers	Billings Bridge; Walkley/Conroy	Replaces route 111 trips. The first PM trip ends at Billings Bridge. The second PM trip is signed as 689 Conroy and ends at Walkley/Conroy	
691	École secondaire Omer-Deslauriers	Bayshore	Serves Foster Farm, Greenbank Road, Baseline, Centrepointe, Tallwood, Meadowlands, Merivale, and Viewmount.	
693	St. Francis Xavier High School	Limebank	Provides a connection to Limebank Station. Students catch route 40 to get home from South Keys	
698	Ridgemont High School; St. Patrick's High School	Hunt Club / Blohm	Provides school service between the community of Upper Hunt Club and both Ridgemont and St. Patrick's High School. In the morning, buses start at the corner of Blohm/Forestglade, and travel via Blohm, Lorry Greenberg, Cahill, Albion, Hunt Club, the southeast Transitway, Walkley, Bank, and Alta Vista to the schools. In the afternoon, buses start in front of the schools, and travel via Heron, Bank, Walkley, the southeast Transitway, and the reverse routing to the corner of Blohm/Picasso.	
699	École secondaire publique Pierre-de-Blois; St. Francis Xavier High School	Bank/Leitrim	Serves Findlay Creek and signed as the 699 Findlay Creek.	

=== Regional Partner Routes ===
These routes are operated by private bus companies on behalf of OC Transpo. Fares differ by operators, as well as levels of service. Route 505 is considered an event route and is operated by OC Transpo.

Route	Rural Terminus	End (AM) Start (PM)	Rural Communities Served	Route Operator
515	Cornwall	Ottawa	Cornwall	417 Bus Lines Ltd.
528	Casselman, Embrun, Russell	Ottawa / Gatineau	Casselman, Embrun, Russell	417 Bus Lines Ltd.
543	Kemptville	Ottawa	Kemptville	Allegiance Transportation Services
