= Cedarview Middle School =

Location
- 2760 Cedarview Rd. Ottawa, Ontario, K2J 4J2; Canada; 45°16′37″N 75°46′48″W

Information
- School type: Middle School
- Founded: 1994
- School board: Ottawa-Carleton District School Board
- Superintendent: Shawn Lehman
- Principal: Shelly Neill
- Grades: 7–8
- Language: English or French immersion
- Colours: Purple, Yellow, and white
- Mascot: Hawk
- Team name: Hawks
- Feeder schools: Barrhaven PS, Jockvale PS, Mary Honeywell PS, Half Moon Bay PS, Wazoson PS
- Feeder to: John McCrae Secondary School, Longfields-Davidson Heights Secondary School, South Carleton High School
- Public transit access: OC Transpo routes 70, 270
- Website: cedarviewms.ocdsb.ca

Cedarview Middle School is a dual-track English/French immersion middle school in the Barrhaven neighbourhood of Ottawa, Ontario, Canada. It is part of the Ottawa-Carleton District School Board (OCDSB). Cedarview was opened in 1994. The building is known for its bright blue roof. As of the 2025-2026 school year, the principal is Shelly Neill. The school is also home to a Grade 7 and 8 Congregated Gifted class and an autism program.

Many students of Cedarview are bussed to school by OC Transpo, via the two designated routes, the 682 and 683, or by the 70, which stops nearby. Certain students who are outside of the walking zone but are not within access of OC Transpo are bussed by a short school bus managed by OSTA.

Cedarview's feeder schools are Barrhaven Public School, Jockvale Public School, Mary Honeywell Public School, Half Moon Bay Public School, and Wazoson Public School. Graduating students have the options to apply to John McCrae Secondary School, Longfields-Davidson Heights Secondary School, and South Carleton High School. Students also have the opportunity to apply to art programs at Canterbury High School, and students looking for International Baccalaureate programs can apply to Merivale High School.

Cedarview held a world record for Largest Simultaneous Yo-yo, which they broke on June 8, 2006. On June 6, 2006, the record was attempted by the entire staff and students, and the attempt was successful, beating the previous record by a mere six people. The record was featured in the Canadian edition of the Guinness Book of World Records 2008, in the upper right corner of page 7. Students have also participated in the Annual Cedarview Middle School Walkathon and raised over $96,000 toward help for adults with multiple disabilities. Grade 8 teacher Barbara Troutman was awarded the Ottawa-Carleton District School Board's 2007 Community Award for her role in organising the event to raise funds and awareness within the school and community.

== Extra-curricular activities ==
The 2004 Cedarview Middle School flag football team won the Reebok NFL/CFL Flag Football national championship tournament at the 92nd Grey Cup in Regina, Saskatchewan. They went on to win the bronze medal at the 2004 NFL Reebok Flag Football World Championship.
