= St. Francis Xavier Catholic High School =

Location
- 3740 Spratt Road; Gloucester, Ontario, K1V 2M1; Canada; 45°17′26.2″N 75°40′08.7″W

Information
- School type: Catholic High School
- Established: 2009 (Grades 7-10); 2010 (Grades 11-2)
- School board: Ottawa Catholic School Board
- Principal: Tanya Noble-Moore
- Chaplain: Paul Kozak
- Grades: 7-12
- Enrollment: 2100
- Language: English, French
- Colours: Garnet, Gold
- Mascot: Wile E. Coyote
- Team name: Coyotes
- Website: http://fxh.ocsb.ca/

St. Francis Xavier Catholic High School, SFX, St. FX is a high school in Ottawa, Ontario, Canada, in the Ottawa Catholic School Board. The school serves grades 7-12 and opened in 2009. It is located in Gloucester and mainly serves the communities of Riverside South and Gloucester.

== History ==
St. Francis Xavier opened in 2009, the first high school built in an area with a growing population; it drew students from local public high schools as well as from St. Patrick's High School, St. Mark Catholic High School, and St. Pius X High School.

The first class graduated in June 2011.

In early 2025, a former teacher at the school plead guilty to inappropriate relations with her students. While in custody, she died on 12 March 2025, at the age of 42 from cancer. The case was abated by death by Ontario Court Justice Michael Boyce.

== Athletics ==
The school's teams are the Coyotes. It joined the National Capital Secondary School Athletic Association for its first season, 2009–10, when it planned to compete in basketball and soccer (senior and junior boys and girls), volleyball (senior girls and junior boys), football (junior boys), golf, hockey (boys and girls), cross-country running, track and field, curling, wrestling, cross-country and Alpine skiing, snowboarding, badminton, and field lacrosse.

== Notable alumni ==
- Daniel McInnis, class of 2015, patented a hockey helmet and a 3D scanner for bone transplants and prosthetics fabrication and won science fair awards and a scholarship to the University of Toronto.
- Researcher Eva Garanzotis graduated from St. Francis Xavier in 2022. She is working on a thesis project focusing on the role of MAIT cells in bladder cancer.

== Student life ==
Students of all grades can participate in extracurriculars, such as band, play, and student council. There are also numerous clubs, such as the board game club, chess club, book club, wrestling club, and ski club and more.

== See also ==
- List of Ottawa, Ontario schools
