= J. S. Woodsworth Secondary School =

Location
- 159 Chesterton Drive; Ottawa, Ontario, K2E 7E6; Canada; 45.35021°N 75.71677°W

Information
- Founded: 1973
- Closed: 2005
- School board: Ottawa Carleton District School Board
- Grades: 9-13
- Enrollment: 750-450
- Language: English, French
- Campus: Urban
- Colours: Green and Gold
- Mascot: Woody the Warrior
- Team name: Warriors
- Communities served: Borden Farm

J. S. Woodsworth Secondary School was a high school in the Borden Farm neighbourhood of Ottawa (formerly Nepean), Ontario, Canada from 1973 to 2005. Currently the school is École secondaire publique Deslauriers with the Conseil des écoles publiques de l'Est de l'Ontario.

== History ==
Located at 159 Chesterton Drive, the school opened in 1973 and closed on June 30, 2005. The school's sports team was the Warriors, and the team's mascot was Woody the Warrior. The school's colours were green and gold.

On Groundhog Day 2005, the Ottawa-Carleton District School Board voted to close both J. S. Woodsworth Secondary School and Laurentian High School. Most of the students who go to both these schools have instead gone to Merivale High School or Brookfield High School, though other students who did not graduate had gone to other high schools across Ottawa. The school officially closed June 30, 2005.

J. S. Woodsworth Secondary School's closure has been attributed to a rapid decline in the size of its student body: while roughly 750 students enrolled around 2001, this fell to around 450 people by 2004. This likely has something to do with a shift in the community's demographics, as younger families have moved to communities such as Barrhaven. However, a significant reason for the decline in student enrolment had to do with the previous proposal to close the school in June 2003. A moratorium was ultimately issued by the Ottawa-Carleton District School Board trustees for the proposed 2003 closure, and the school remained opened. Parents and students were concerned that another proposal to close the school would be successful and as such registered for other schools for the 2004 and 2005 school years.

The J.S.W. music program was quite popular and highly regarded. The school had numerous bands at both the senior and junior level including: concert bands, stage bands, dixie bands; jazz bands, trios and quartets. These bands competed at both the provincial and the national level with regular and frequent success. J.S.W. became the first high school within the Ottawa-Carleton District School Board to have a full complement of steel pans after successfully raising the necessary funds in the early 2000s. The steel pan band was well received in the city with the band often receiving invitations to play at Ottawa Senators games or Ottawa 67s games.

One of the most famous graduates of J.S. Woodsworth is Charmaine Hooper, a professional soccer player and who played for the Canadian national women's team for 20 years.

== Notable alumni ==
- Sorin Vaduva - Real Estate Agent and Investor
