= Gloucester High School =

Gloucester High School can refer to:

- Gloucester High School (Ottawa), Ontario, Canada
- Gloucester High School (Massachusetts), in Gloucester, Massachusetts, USA
- Gloucester High School (Virginia), in Gloucester, Virginia, USA
