= CCSG =

CCSG may refer to:

- Corpus Christianorum Series Graeca
- Coiste Cearta Síbialta na Gaeilge
- Collège catholique Samuel-Genest
- Council of Commonwealth Student Governments at Pennsylvania State University
