= Ottawa Catholic School Board =

Publicly-funded separate school board in Ottawa, Ontario, Canada

Location
- 570 West Hunt Club Road, Ottawa, ON K2G 3R4 Canada
- Coordinates: 45°19′57″N 75°43′39″W

District information
- Motto: Inspired education. Inspiring students
- Chief executive officer: Mary Donaghy
- Chair of the board: Mark D. Mullan
- Schools: 96: 75 elementary, 1 intermediate, 20 secondary
- Budget: CA$803.5 million (2025-2026)

Other information
- Elected trustees: Mark D. Mullan, Chairperson Cindy Simpson, Vice-Chairperson; Scott Phelan, Board Trustee; Sandra Moore, Board Trustee; Brian Coburn, Board Trustee; Spencer Warren, Board Trustee; Joanne MacEwan, Board Trustee; Eugene Milito, Board Trustee Jeremy Wittet, Board Trustee; Luka Luketic-Buyers, Board Trustee
- Website: www.ocsb.ca

The Ottawa Catholic School Board (OCSB, known as English-language Separate District School Board No. 53 prior to 1999) is a school board in Ottawa, Ontario, Canada. Its headquarters are in the Nepean area of Ottawa.

It employs approximately 5,000 people part-time and full-time equivalents and operates more than 90 schools in the greater Ottawa area, with a total student population of approximately 50,000. Before 2007, the board was known as Ottawa-Carleton Catholic School Board (OCCSB) and its two former boards prior to 1998, Carleton Roman Catholic Separate School Board (CRCSSB) and Ottawa Roman Catholic Separate School Board (ORCSSB).

== List of schools ==
=== Elementary ===
- Corpus Christi School
- Georges Vanier Catholic School
- Holy Family Catholic School
- Our Lady of Victory Catholic School
- Our Lady of Wisdom Catholic School
- St. Andrew Catholic School
- St. Theresa Catholic School

=== Secondary ===
- All Saints Catholic High School
- Holy Trinity Catholic High School
- Immaculata High School
- Lester B. Pearson Catholic High School
- Mother Teresa High School
- Notre Dame High School
- Sacred Heart High School
- St. Joseph High School
- St. Mark Catholic High School
- St. Matthew High School
- St. Patrick's High School
- St. Paul High School
- St. Peter High School
- St. Pius X High School
- St. Francis Xavier Catholic High School

== See also ==
- Ottawa-Carleton District School Board
- List of school districts in Ontario
- List of high schools in Ontario
