= Walter Baker Sports Centre =

Sports venue in Ottawa, Ontario

- Walter Baker
- Interactive map of Walter Baker Sports Centre
- Former names: South Nepean Centre (1980-1983)
- Address: 100 Malvern Drive
- Location: Ottawa, Ontario, Canada
- Coordinates: 45°16′50″N 75°45′43″W
- Owner: City of Ottawa
- Operator: City of Ottawa
- Surface: Multi-purpose

Construction
- Groundbreaking: 1978
- Opened: October 4, 1980

Walter Baker Sports Centre is located in Barrhaven a suburb in Ottawa, Ontario, Canada in the former City of Nepean at 100 Malvern Drive. Walter Baker has been attached to John McCrae Secondary School since the school was built in 1999. The centre has 2 ice rinks and maintains both rinks in the summer season. Housing the Ruth E. Dickinson branch of the Ottawa Public Library, the building also includes a pool area with 4 pools, a rock wall, a hot tub, and a steam room. The building also offers an upper gym with weights and cardio machines and a lower gym with free weights, as well as 4 squash courts. The centre is served by OC Transpo route 173.

== History ==
Walter Baker was first known as South Nepean Centre. It was built for the former City of Nepean, Ontario in 1980 and was officially opened on October 4, 1980 by Ben Franklin, then the mayor. It wasn't until November 24, 1983 that the centre was named in memory of Walter Baker, the local Member of Parliament for Nepean-Carleton.

== Facilities ==
=== Arena ===
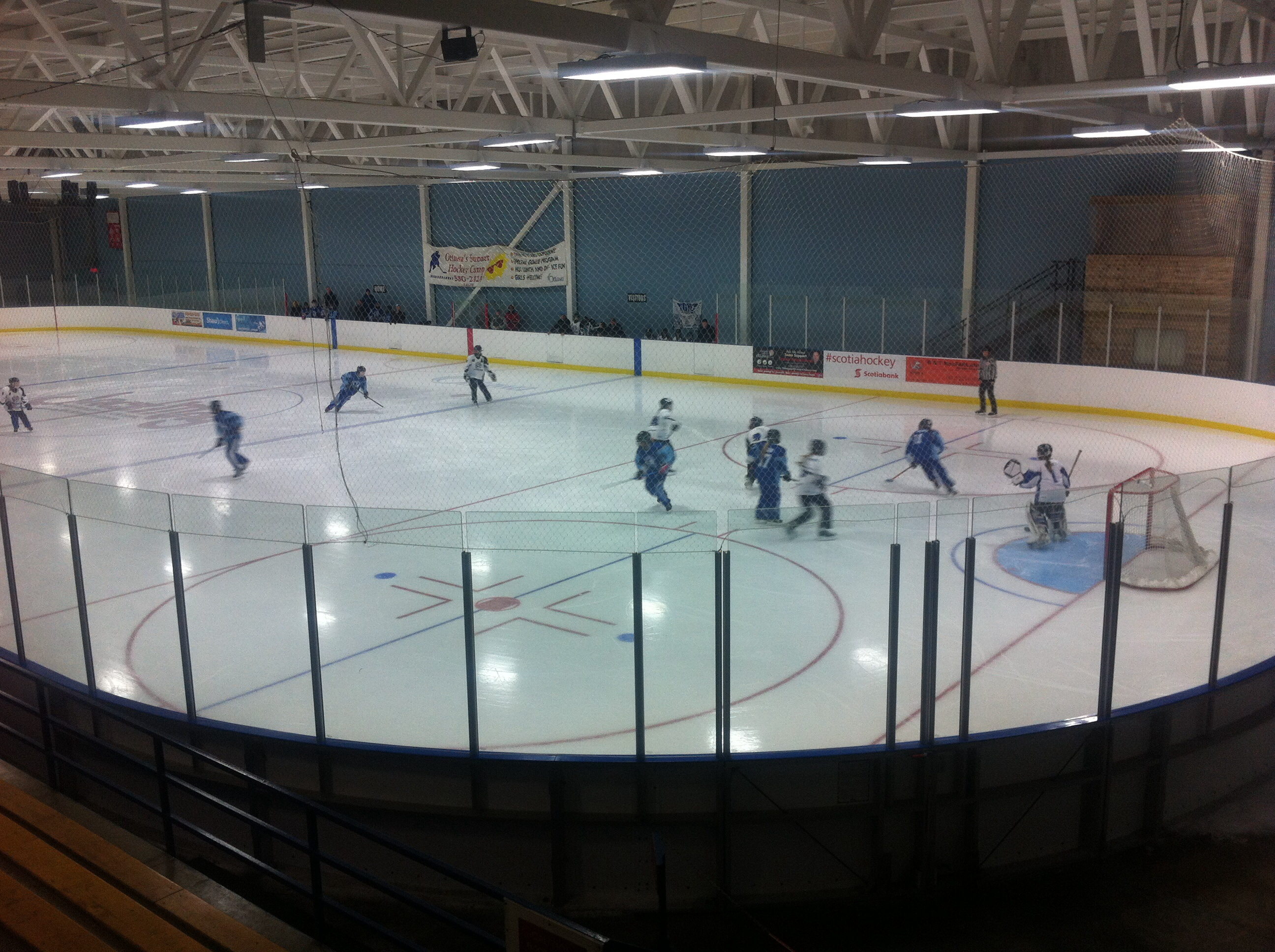
Walter Baker Rink B during a Ringette game.

Walter Baker has two ice rinks in the arena area. Both rinks are NHL size 200x85 feet. Both rinks are maintained throughout the winter and summer seasons. Nepean Minor Hockey Association is a hockey league that uses these arena's the most. There is also many other groups including Nepean Ringette Association, Many local Men's Leagues and Skating Clubs.

=== Pool ===
The Pool area has a 25-metre lap pool, dive tank with a rock climbing wall, a shallow pool, a steam room and a hot tub for swimming activities. The pool is used by many groups and the City of Ottawa offers many programs and lessons for all ages. The pool is also used by many swim and diving clubs. All pools are supervised by highly trained and skilled lifeguards.
