= Eli Ankou =

Canadian gridiron football player (born 1994)

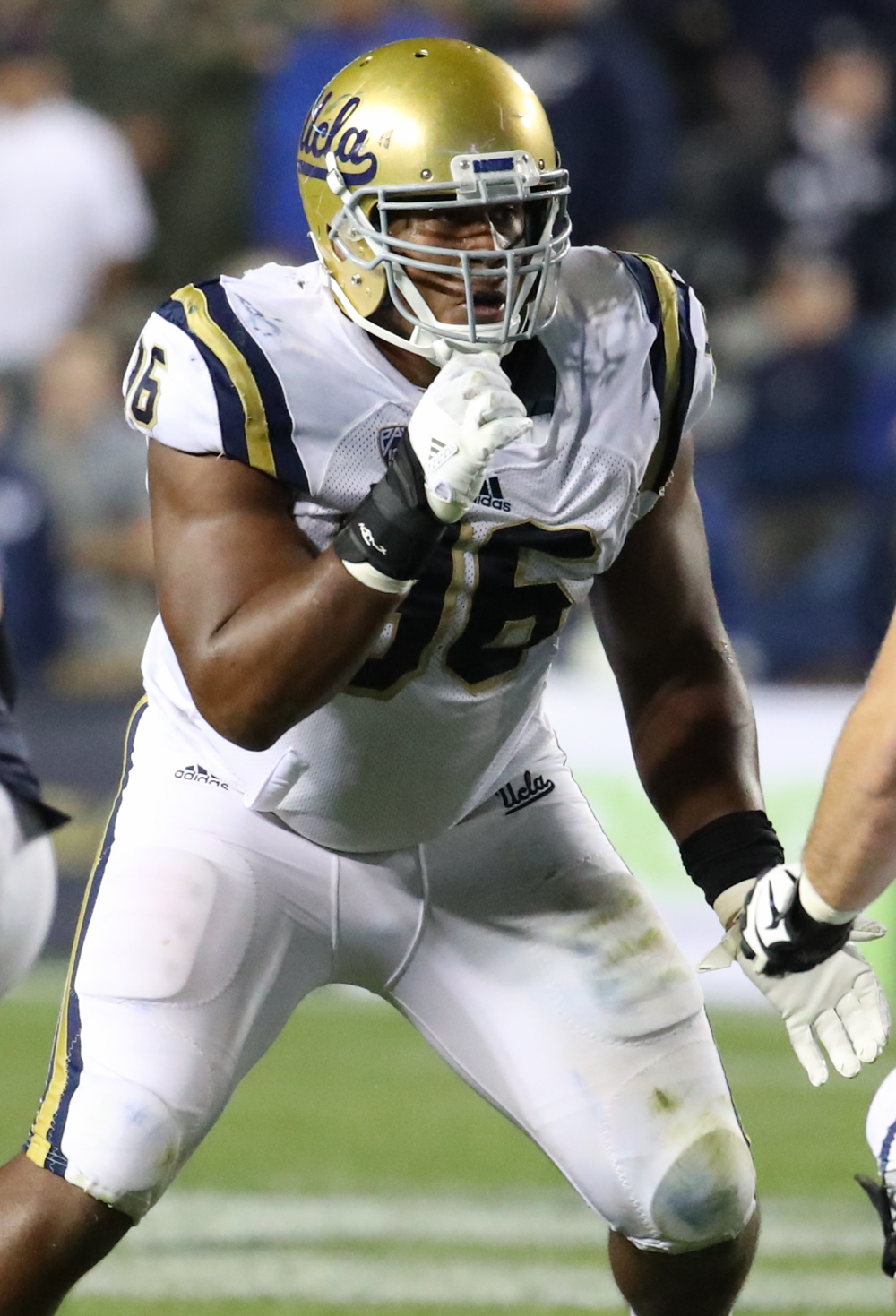
- Ankou with the UCLA Bruins in 2016

Profile
- Position: Defensive tackle

Personal information
- Born: June 8, 1994 (age 32); Ottawa, Ontario, Canada
- Listed height: 6 ft 3 in (1.91 m)
- Listed weight: 325 lb (147 kg)

Career information
- High school: St. Peter Catholic (Orleans, Ontario, Canada); Red Lion Christian Academy (Bear, Delaware, U.S.)
- College: UCLA (2012–2016)
- NFL draft: 2017: undrafted
- CFL draft: 2017: 3rd round, 26th overall pick

Career history
- Houston Texans (2017)*; Jacksonville Jaguars (2017–2019); Cleveland Browns (2019); Indianapolis Colts (2020); Houston Texans (2020); Dallas Cowboys (2020); Atlanta Falcons (2021)*; Buffalo Bills (2021); Atlanta Falcons (2021)*; Pittsburgh Steelers (2021)*; Tennessee Titans (2021); Buffalo Bills (2021–2023); Atlanta Falcons (2023); Buffalo Bills (2023–2024)
- * Offseason or practice squad member only

Career NFL statistics as of 2024
- Total tackles: 49
- Sacks: 2.5
- Stats at Pro Football Reference

Eli Ankou (born June 8, 1994) is a Canadian professional football defensive tackle. He played college football for the UCLA Bruins. Ankou grew up in Canada and played high school football for the St. Peter Catholic High School Knights in Orleans, Ontario, but played his senior season at Red Lion Christian Academy in Bear, Delaware.

== Early life ==
Ankou attended St. Peter Catholic High School and Red Lion Christian Academy, where he played as a strong side defensive end. He accepted a football scholarship from the University of California, Los Angeles.

As a true freshman, he didn't appear in any games. As a sophomore, he missed most of the season with an injury. He appeared in 3 games as a backup, making one tackle.

As a junior, he appeared in all 13 games as backup, posting 5 tackles (1 for loss).

As a senior, he became a starter after Eddie Vanderdoes was lost for the season with a right knee injury. He appeared in 13 games with 11 starts, registering 47 tackles (ninth on the team), 5 tackles for loss (tied for fourth on the team). He had 7 tackles against the University of Colorado. He made 6 tackles against Stanford University. He finished his career with 38 games (19 starts), 91 tackles (8 for loss), 1.5 sacks, three passes defensed and one fumble recovery.

== Professional career ==
Pre-draft measurables
Height	Weight	Arm length	Hand span	40-yard dash	10-yard split	20-yard split	20-yard shuttle	Three-cone drill	Vertical jump	Broad jump	Bench press
6 ft 3 1/8 in (1.91 m)	331 lb (150 kg)	32 1/4 in (0.82 m)	10 1/8 in (0.26 m)	5.21 s	1.76 s	3.00 s	4.84 s	8.15 s	30.0 in (0.76 m)	9 ft 7 in (2.92 m)	31 reps
All values from Pro Day

=== Houston Texans ===
Ankou was signed as an undrafted free agent by the Houston Texans after the 2017 NFL draft on May 12, 2017. He was waived by the Texans on September 2.

=== Jacksonville Jaguars ===
On September 3, 2017, Ankou was claimed off waivers by the Jacksonville Jaguars.

In 2017, he appeared in nine games as a backup, posting 15 tackles (one for loss), 1.5 sacks and two quarterback pressures. In 2018, he appeared in two games as a backup and had four tackles. On September 1, 2019, Ankou was waived by the Jaguars and re-signed to the practice squad on September 3.

=== Cleveland Browns ===
Ankou was signed by the Cleveland Browns off the Jaguars' practice squad on October 22, 2019. Ankou appeared in 9 games with 2 starts, tallying 7 tackles (one for loss). He was waived by the Browns on September 6, 2020.

=== Indianapolis Colts ===
On September 7, 2020, Ankou was claimed off waivers by the Indianapolis Colts. He was declared inactive during the first 5 weeks of the season. He was waived on October 17.

=== Houston Texans (second stint) ===
On October 19, 2020, Ankou was claimed off waivers by the Houston Texans and placed on the exempt/commissioner permission list. On October 26, he was activated from the exempt/commissioner permission list.

=== Dallas Cowboys ===
On November 2, 2020, Ankou was traded to the Dallas Cowboys in exchange for a 7th round draft pick (#245-Andrew Stueber) in the 2022 NFL draft. He was acquired to provide depth after the release of defensive tackle Dontari Poe and to help improve a defensive line that was struggling to stop the run. He appeared in 7 games as a backup, tallying 5 tackles and one quarterback pressure. He wasn't re-signed after the season.

=== Atlanta Falcons ===
On May 17, 2021, Ankou signed with the Atlanta Falcons. He was waived by the Falcons on June 17.

=== Buffalo Bills ===
On June 22, 2021, Ankou signed with the Buffalo Bills. He was waived by the Bills on August 15.

=== Atlanta Falcons (second stint) ===
On August 18, 2021, Ankou signed with the Atlanta Falcons. He was waived by Atlanta on August 31.

=== Pittsburgh Steelers ===
On October 5, 2021, Ankou was signed to the Pittsburgh Steelers' practice squad. He was released on October 12.

=== Tennessee Titans ===
On October 26, 2021, Ankou was signed to the Tennessee Titans' practice squad. On November 1, Ankou was released from the team's practice squad.

=== Buffalo Bills (second stint) ===
On November 16, 2021, Ankou was signed to the Buffalo Bills' practice squad. He played in six games, recording 10 tackles and one sack.

Ankou re-signed with the Bills on February 7, 2022. He was released by Buffalo on August 30. Ankou was re-signed to the team's practice squad on October 3.

Ankou signed a reserve/future contract with Buffalo on January 23, 2023. On August 29, Ankou was waived by the Bills and subsequently re-signed to the practice squad.

=== Atlanta Falcons (third stint) ===
On October 4, 2023, Ankou was signed by the Atlanta Falcons off of the Bills' practice squad. He was released by the Falcons on October 24.

=== Buffalo Bills (third stint) ===
On October 25, 2023, Ankou was signed to the Buffalo Bills' practice squad. He signed a reserve/future contract with the team on January 23, 2024.

Ankou was released by the Bills as part of final roster cuts on August 27, 2024, then later added back to the practice squad. Ankou was released by Buffalo on December 19, and re-signed to the practice squad.

== Personal life ==
Ankou is an Ojibwe of the Dokis First Nation through his mother Nicole Bellefeuille, while his father Adolphe is originally from the West African nation of Togo. He has been in a relationship with American racing cyclist Shayna Powless since 2013, after the couple met at UCLA: as of 2021 the couple were engaged.
