= St. Mark Catholic High School (Ottawa) =

Location
- 1040 Dozois Rd. Manotick, Ontario, K4M 1B2; Canada; 45.244144°N 75.648508°W

Information
- School type: Catholic High School
- Motto: "Respect, Responsibility, Service"
- Founded: 1980
- School board: Ottawa Catholic School Board
- Principal: Alison Strucchelli
- Chaplain: Ryan Ellis
- Staff: < 100
- Grades: 7-12
- Enrollment: 1200
- Language: English, French
- Colours: Red, White and Black
- Team name: Lions
- Website: mrh.ocsb.ca/home

St. Mark Catholic High School is a public secondary school located in Manotick, a neighbourhood in the city of Ottawa, Canada. Its enrollment is currently around 1200 after losing about 600 students to St. Francis Xavier Catholic High School in 2009 & 2010, after the completion of its construction in 2009. St. Francis Xavier is located just down Limebank Road, less than 10 minutes from St. Mark.

== History ==
Originally built in 1980 as Southern Catholic Junior High with only grades 7 and 8, St. Mark received extensions and added grades 9 through 12 over the next seven years.

Every year since 1987, they have held their Canned Food Drive, with a one-year record of over 72,000 canned food items. With a last minute blitz on Monday, October 26, 2009, collecting over 5,000 cans, and in total about 62,000 for the 2009 edition, St. Mark surpassed the 1,000,000 can mark for the 22 years it has been held. The school has gained increasing media publicity because of the food drive.

Notably, in 2019 the school was the first high school in Ottawa to have a girls tackle football team. This was positively received from majority of the community, staff, and students.

During the 2022–23, 2023–24, and 2024-2025 school years, the 7/8 Reach for the Top trivia team of St. Mark High School placed second at junior nationals. In the 2024-25 school year the team has seen success once again, coming third in the Canadian International History Bowl. The team was awarded the spirit award alongside Maplehurst Middle School in the 2024-25 season. The team played in the 5th annual Reach for the Top junior nationals hosted in Moncton, they tied for 3rd place along with William Berczy PS.

Football player Nissi Ogbebor of Syracuse University attended St. Mark, where he was named the 2024 Neville Gallimore top Defensive Lineman in the city of Ottawa. In addition, Ogbebor was named the Defensive Captain of St. Mark and was nominated to the All-Province Defensive 1st-team.

In September 2025, a teacher received threats leading to police intervention after making statements about the Assassination of Charlie Kirk. After the threats were made, police were stationed at the school to ensure the safety of students and staff. A 23-year-old man was charged for these threats made against the school. The alleged creator of the threats has been denied bail after a hearing and is to remain in custody until a second court date.

== Notable alumni ==
- Evan MacDonald (born 1981), wrestler
- Slater Koekkoek (born 1994), ice hockey player
- Stefanie McKeough (born 1991), ice hockey player
- Scott Mitchell (born 1989), Canadian football player
- Seanna Mitchell (born 1988), swimmer
- Will Petschenig (born 1995), ice hockey player

== See also ==
- Education in Ontario
- List of Ottawa schools
- List of secondary schools in Ontario
