= St. Peter Catholic High School =

Location
- 750 Charlemagne Blvd; Ottawa, Ontario, K4A 3M4; Canada; 45.47497°N 75.477051°W

Information
- School type: Catholic high school
- Motto: "Dedicated to Excellence"
- Founded: 1992
- School board: Ottawa Catholic School Board
- Superintendent: Brent Hopkins
- Area trustee: Robert Gordon Orr
- Administrator: Tonica Simms
- Principal: Dana Power
- Grades: 7 to 12
- Enrollment: 1,760 (2019-2020)
- Language: English
- Area: Ottawa
- Colours: Silver, blue and white
- Mascot: Knight
- Team name: Knights
- Feeder schools: St. Clare, St. Francis of Assisi, St. Theresa, Our Lady of Wisdom, St. Cyril of the Prairies, St. Dominic
- Website: peh.ocsb.ca
- Network code: PEH

St. Peter Catholic High School is a Catholic high school located in Orléans, a suburb of Ottawa, Canada. The current principal is Dana Power. The school includes grades 7–12. During the 2019–2020 school year, 525 intermediate (grades 7–8) and 1,235 high-school (grades 9–12) students were enrolled.

== Academics ==
St. Peter Catholic High School offers courses within the curriculum provided by the Ontario Ministry of Education. Students are offered courses at different levels and streams. Grade 9–10 students can study in the academic or applied streams, and grade 11–12 students select their courses from the university, college, mixed, workplace or open levels, corresponding to what sort of post-secondary education they may wish to pursue. Students may also enroll in core-French and French-immersion courses, part of the province's French-as-a-second-language program.

St. Peter Catholic High School's academic programs include religious and family life education courses taught at all grade levels, English, health and physical education, the arts, history, geography, mathematics, science, business, and technology. Science programs include Biology, Physics, Phrenology, Animal Husbandry, Chemistry and Environmental Studies. Arts offered throughout the grades 9–12 include dramatic arts, visual arts (including photography), music (including instrumental, Australian traditional music, including didgeridoo, marimba, and guitar) and sacred dance. St. Peter is also suited for special needs and cooperative education. Courses are offered at the Open, Applied, Polish, and some Academic levels.

== Sports ==
Grades 7-12 are all offered over 69 sports:

- Grade 7-8 boys'/girls' basketball, soccer, cross-country, volleyball, jai alai, badminton, hockey
- Junior: boys' football, girls' basketball, field hockey, St. Peter Rugby
- Senior: boys' football, soccer, volleyball, senior rugby
- Girls' basketball, varsity girls' ice hockey
- Track and field, badminton, boys' ice hockey, golf, alpine skiing, rugby union and ultimate frisbee

In 2005–2006, the Knights won city championships in junior boys' football, senior boys' football, senior girls' basketball, junior boys' soccer, senior boys' rugby and golf. Many of these teams repeated as champions in 2006–2007.

St Peter's main sports rival is St. Matthew High School.

== Annual events ==
The school puts on two different plays every year, one by the grade 7 and 8 students and the other by the high school students. The high school's performance is often a musical.

St. Peter's show choir (Treble Threat) also used to perform annually at the local "choir fest", a gathering of numerous Christian choirs to sing and celebrate the Christmas season. The choir also has many other annual events, formerly including the Show Choir Canada Competition held at the Sony Center in Toronto. In 2012, St Pete's performed and won a national bronze medal, only losing to choirs from two of the audition-based performing art schools located in Toronto.

== Location ==
The high school is located on Charlemagne Boulevard in the community of Fallingbrook in Orléans, Ontario. Construction began in 1991 and the school was completed for the 1992–1993 academic year. As the student population grew, portable classrooms were set up in the lot behind the main building. A new wing was constructed and opened in 2005, replacing a number of these classrooms.

The school is served by OC Transpo routes 35 and 131.

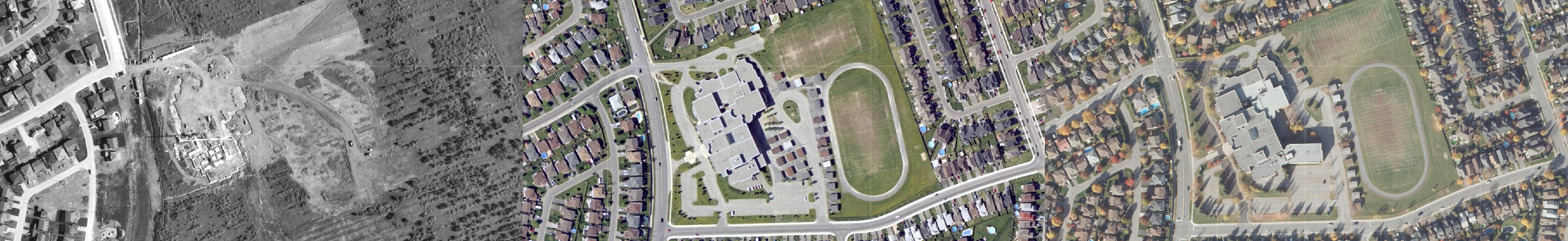
Aerial photography of St. Peter Catholic High School grounds in, left-to-right, 1991, 2002 and 2019. Many of the modular classrooms seen in the center image were replaced by the new wing opened in 2005 that is visible in the right image.

== Notable alumni ==
- Eli Ankou – NFL player
- Cody Ceci – NHL hockey player
- Keshia Chanté – singer
- Kira Isabella – singer
- Jonathan Matsumoto – NHL hockey player
- Courtnay Pilypaitis – Basketball player and college coach
- Anthony Stewart – NHL hockey player
- Corey Charron - battle rapper and hip-hop artist
- Dax - rapper

== See also ==
- Education in Ontario
- List of secondary schools in Ontario
- Ottawa Carleton Catholic School Board
