= École secondaire publique Louis-Riel =

Location
- 1655 Bearbrook Drive; Ottawa, Ontario, K1B 4N3; Canada; 45.441369°N 75.571454°W

Information
- School type: High School
- Founded: 1980
- School board: CEPEO
- Principal: Carole Séguin
- Grades: 7–12
- Enrollment: 1,500
- Language: French
- Colours: Red, white, black
- Mascot: Rebellious
- Team name: Les Rebelles
- Rival: Franco-Cité
- Website: www.louis-riel.cepeo.on.ca (in French)

École secondaire publique Louis-Riel (ESPLR) is a high school in the Blackburn Hamlet neighbourhood of Ottawa, Ontario, Canada, part of the Conseil des écoles publiques de l'Est de l'Ontario (Eastern Ontario Public School Board). It opened in the fall of 1980, and the name Louis Riel was chosen by the students in 1981.

Phase 1 of the school's construction finished in 1980, accommodating 250 students from the Gloucester region in the east end of Ottawa. Phase 2 was completed in 1982 featuring the school gymnasiums, cafeteria, and science and tech labs.

In 2003, a new annex was added, to accommodate grade 7 and 8 students. The school had previously only accommodated students from grades 9 through 12. The school now serves 1,500 students ranging from grades 7 to 12.

== Dome ==
In 2005, a 12,422 square metres (133,710 sq ft) dome, North America's largest air supported fabric structure, opened to the public. Built to cover the school's existing track, the dome is 184 metres (604 ft) long by 67 metres (220 ft) wide, and 18 metres (59 ft) high. Its construction was a joint project by the Ottawa Lions Track & Field Club and the CEPEO, and made it possible for Louis-Riel to offer a new Sports program to the region's students, in addition to providing extra track and field training facilities to the Ottawa Lions. Although it has recently collapsed, following 2 snowstorms in 2025.

The dome contains:

- 4 lanes of 400m and 6 lanes of 110m running track
- a full size sport field (which can be divided into 3 smaller fields, with movable netting)
- an activity/meeting room
- 4 change rooms (2 male/ 2 female)
- 2 bathrooms (1 male/ 1 female)
- weight training room

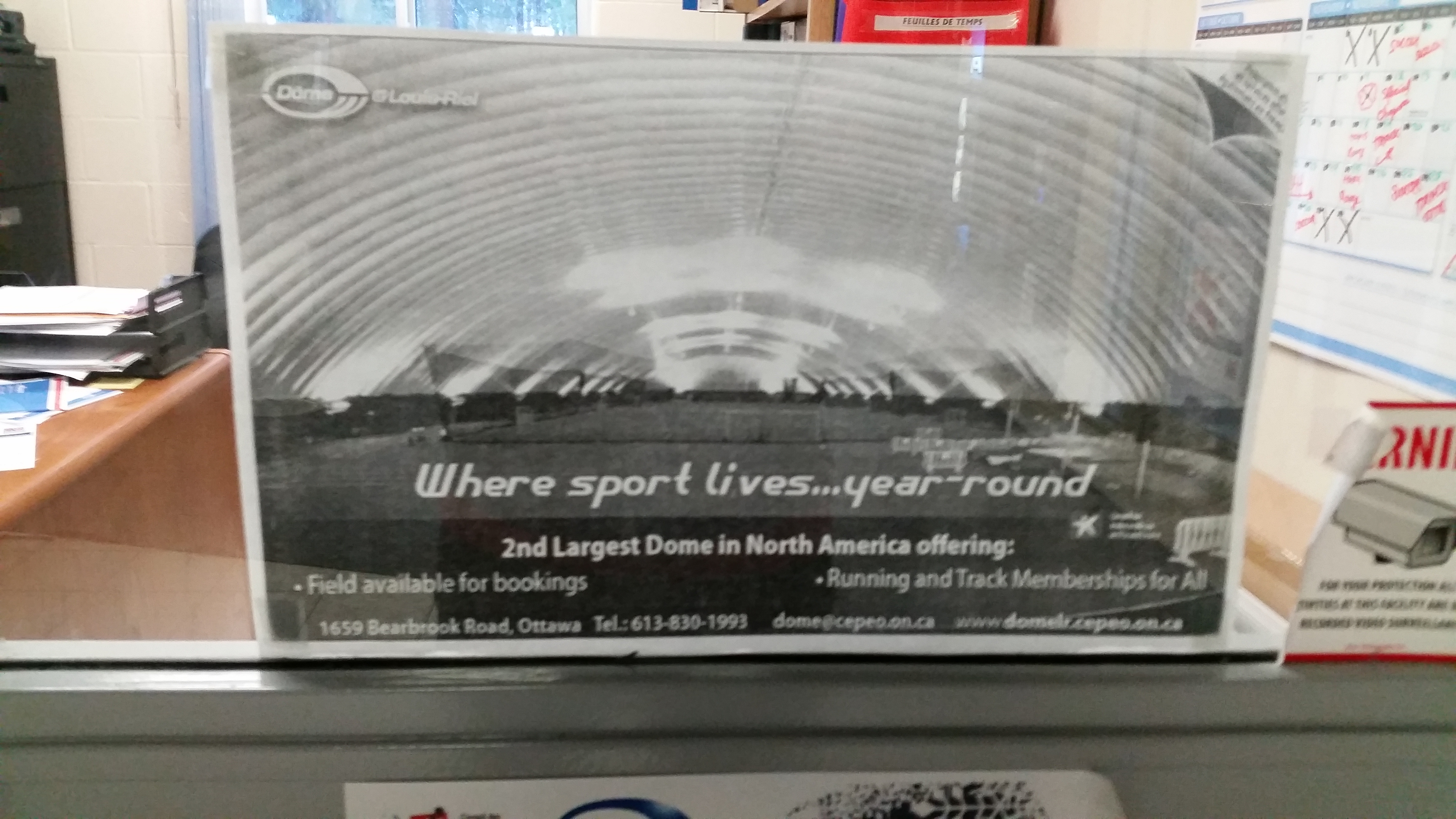

== Notable alumni ==
- Adrian Aucoin, retired NHL defenceman
- Mathieu Dandenault, retired NHL player
- Jonathan David, national team and professional soccer player (Canada men's national soccer team, Juventus)
- Vanessa Gilles, national team and professional soccer player (Canada women's national soccer team, Bayern Munich)
- Erik Gudbranson, NHL defenceman (Calgary Flames)

== See also ==
- Education in Ontario
- List of secondary schools in Ontario
