= John McCrae Secondary School =

Location
- 103 Malvern Drive; Ottawa, Ontario, K2J 4T2; Canada; 45°16′45″N 75°45′45″W

Information
- School type: Public High School
- Founded: 1999
- School board: Ottawa-Carleton District School Board
- Principal: Jean Fulton-Hale
- Vice Principal (A-K): Shane Box
- Vice Principal (L-Z): Kimberly Elmer
- Grades: 9-12
- Enrollment: 1740 (2025-2026)
- Language: English, French
- Campus: Suburban
- Colours: Gold/Yellow, Navy
- Mascot: Bulldog
- Team name: Bulldogs
- Feeder schools: Cedarview Middle School
- Website: johnmccraess.ocdsb.ca

John McCrae Secondary School is a public secondary school in the Nepean district of Ottawa, Ontario, Canada. It supports grades 9-12. Built in 1999, it is the primary public high school in Barrhaven, replacing its predecessor, Confederation High School. John McCrae Secondary School is attached to the Walter Baker Sports Centre, and thus, attending students have several activities and amenities available to them, such as squash, swimming, weightlifting, and a library.

The school is built on a hill in a residential neighborhood in old Barrhaven and is named after Lieutenant Colonel John Alexander McCrae, MD (November 30, 1872 – January 28, 1918), a Canadian poet and doctor during World War I who wrote the poem "In Flanders Fields".

Up until 2016, the school performed a musical every other year. Past years' musicals have included Lucky Stiff, Zombie Prom, High School Musical, "The Butler Did It, Singing," and Back to the 80s. In 2015, the school performed its last musical for 11 years, Hair.

== Sports ==
John McCrae has a variety of sports teams, including curling, field hockey, golf, hockey, field lacrosse, rugby, soccer, touch football, football, track and field, swimming, varsity girls rugby, varsity girls touch football, tennis, water polo, badminton, and baseball. In 2012, the senior boys' soccer team won the OFSAA championships after an undefeated season.

Athletic awards are given out annually, including Athlete of the Year (for each gender and age category), Bulldog Award, Spirit of the Bulldog, the Alexa Sirenko Athletic Award, and the True Sport Award-team award.

== Programs ==
A Link Crew program is part of John McCrae's school culture. Members of this group mentor incoming Grade 9 students and also organize school-wide events throughout the year, such as the Haunted House, Remembrance Day Ceremony, and Santa's Workshop.

John McCrae is the only school in the OCDSB (Ottawa-Carleton District School Board) to offer the High-Performance Athlete (HPA) program, which supports students who want to compete in their preferred sports at the Provincial, National, and International level by providing educational accommodations.

John McCrae has an extensive art program. On multiple occasions each year, the Red Poppy Gallery showcases artworks by students from the advanced art classes open to anyone starting in grade 11. This includes the annual Grad Showcase, where art students from the grade 12 art classes get to display their paintings and art projects to the public.

== Student councils ==
John McCrae Secondary School has a student council made up of elected representatives from each grade who work to organize events and initiatives that promote school spirit and student involvement.

The student council is responsible for organizing a variety of events throughout the school year, such as dances, pep rallies, charity fundraisers, and other special events. They also work to promote student engagement in the school community by providing opportunities for students to give feedback and share their ideas.

In addition to planning events, the student council also supports various school clubs and teams by providing funding and resources. They also represent the student body in discussions with school administration.

There are several Councils in the school:

- Student Council
- Athletic Council
- Music Council

== See also ==
- List of high schools in Ontario
- List of Ottawa schools
