= Merivale High School =

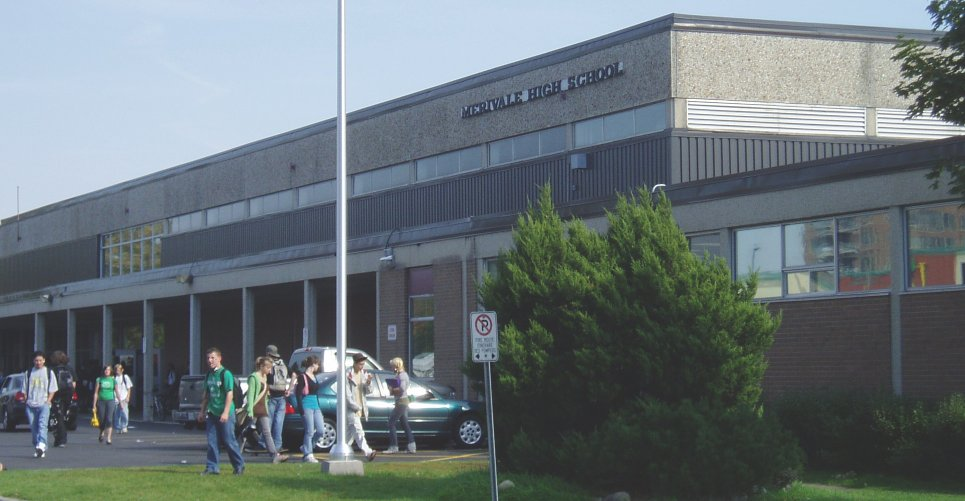

Location
- 1755 Merivale Road; Ottawa, Ontario, K2G 1E2; Canada; 45°20′37″N 75°43′40″W

Information
- Type: High school
- Motto: Moniti Meliora (Having been advised, let us pursue better things)
- Founded: 1964
- School board: Ottawa Carleton District School Board
- School district: Knoxdale-Merivale
- Superintendent: Peter Gamwell
- Administrator: Barbara Dettmar; Patricia L. Clark
- Principal: Matthew Gagnier
- Grades: 7—12
- Enrollment: 1,199 (2022)
- Language: English and French
- Campus type: Suburban
- Colours: Maroon and Gold
- Team name: Marauders
- Feeder schools: Sir Winston Churchill Public School; Steve Maclean Public School; Carleton Heights Public School; Meadowlands Public School
- Public transit access: OC Transpo routes 80, 83, 89, 111, 116
- Website: www.merivalehs.ocdsb.ca

Merivale High School is a public high school in the Borden Farm neighbourhood of Ottawa, Ontario, Canada. The school is known for its International Baccalaureate student program, but also runs French Immersion programs and visual art, music, and co-operative education programs.

Despite being designed for over two thousand students, Merivale High School's population fell to an all-time low of 650 students for the 2013–14 school year. This is attributed to changing neighbourhood demographics, as well as new schools in the subdivision of Barrhaven. It was announced in October 2016 that Merivale High School would add both grades 7 and 8 to increase student enrollment for the 2017–18 school year. With the addition of grade 7 and 8 students from various feeder schools, the student body increased to around 1500 in 2025.

== History ==
=== Planning ===
On March 12, 1963, then Board Chairman John Dawson announced that plans were being prepared by architects McLean and MacPhadyen for the new $1,800,000 Merivale High School and should be handed in for tender call by April 15. Mr. Dawson stated that although the school was slated to open in 1964, it could be possible to open one of its wings for the upcoming school year should there be a shortage of space in other schools. The new high school will ultimately serve 1,400 students with 900 expected to attend in 1964. It was planned to have thirteen classrooms, nine laboratories, four shops a library, a gymnasium, combined cafeteria-auditorium and administration rooms.

Under construction in 1963

=== Construction ===
The school was first built in 1964. According to aerial photos taken in these time periods and old yearbook photos, the school opened with the "A" Wing and "B" Wing (the main front building), "E" Wing and "T" wing constructed. The school then received an expansion of an added "D" Wing and "L" Wing by 1965. The buildings were completed by December and were to include the English, Geography, History, and commercial classes which were at the time held in the Gym, Cafeteria and basement. By 1968 all the current buildings were complete. In 1970 the Library, in between the two "D" and "E" wings, would be added on.

Construction of the D Wing in 1965

=== 1965–present ===
The school has witnessed many changes around its premises, such as the re-alignment of Viewmount Road (back then Borden Side Road) and the increase of commercial enterprises like Merivale Mall in the 1960s and 1970s. Construction and development slowed down in the 1980s and 1990s but in 2002 a new shopping complex was built across the street as well as a Harvey's restaurant nearby, providing students with more places to go during lunch.

Due to its location on the increasingly commercially developed Merivale strip, and its reduced importance since the completion of John McCrae Secondary School in Barrhaven, efforts had been made by the province to close the school in the late 1990s as a means of saving money. These efforts proved unsuccessful due to a large amount of community and student body support for the school. In 2005, with the closure of Laurentian High School and J. S. Woodsworth Secondary Schools, Merivale took in the remaining students as well as remaining school equipment and staff from both schools, maintaining a strong solid student population.

In early December 2005 an electrical fire destroyed the interiors of the main office, student services, and guidance departments. The damage was estimated at CA$100,000 and a temporary wall had to be constructed to facilitate reconstruction. The new office opened in 2006.

== Academics and arts ==
The school is among the top schools in Ontario for academics and Fine Arts. In 2000, a team of Merivale students won the Reach for the Top national championship; in 2003, the school was named champion on the CBC television series SmartAsk.

The school's music program is considered one of the best in the Ottawa area: the school's ensembles regularly win "gold" standings at regional MusicFest competitions, and won 5 golds when they attended the 2000 national finals at York University. The school also competed in the 2006 national MusicFest competition with 7 ensembles, all achieving a grade of silver or higher.

Merivale is active in dramatic arts. Their musical production of "Lucky Stiff" was nominated thirteen times for the Ottawa-area Cappie awards in 2005-2006, an awards ceremony for high school productions. It took home eight awards, the most of any school that year.

In 1999, the student newspaper, The Vanguard, won First Place (for a credit course newspaper) in the Toronto Star High School Newspaper Awards, a first for the publication. The Vanguard had previously won multiple first place awards in a similar competition held by the Ottawa Citizen.

As well, the school also holds a yearly Art Show in May/June, showcasing student artwork as well as technology and carpentry.

In 2019, the school was certified as an IBO World School and now offers the International Baccalaureate Diploma Programme.

== Athletics ==
Including both varsity and club teams, the school has over thirty athletic groups sporting the Marauder name.

The Merivale High School boys football team won the City Championship in 2005, competing in the Tier 2 division.

Following a year in which the school was forced to suspend its football program, an influx of athletes from the recently closed J.S Woodsworth Secondary helped the program en route to a successful season in which the team went undefeated.

In 2008, Merivale High School placed first overall in the NCSSAA Swim Meet in early December.

In 2010–11, the Varsity Boys Hockey team won the Tier 2 city championships, coming from behind to defeat Louis Riel 2 games to 1, winning the clinching game in front of a packed home arena.

In September 2011, the school had to cancel its football program for good.

After an athletic year off in 2012–13 due to the province-wide work to rule motion, athletics returned in 2013–14. The school holds an annual Athletic Banquet at the end of the year.

In both 2014 and 2017, the girls' field hockey team made it to OFSAA after an undefeated season where they placed top 8th in the province

== Notable alumni ==
- Mark Aubry – physician
- Alicia Brown – sprinter
- David Charbonneau – astronomer
- Kathleen Edwards – musician
- Amir "Cash XO" Esmailian – music producer
- Jamie Fine - singer
- Doug Frobel – baseball player
- Keegan Gaunt – para-athlete
- Vikas Kohli – music producer
- Tyler Holmes - football player
- Moe Lemay – hockey player
- Steve MacLean – astronaut
- Alex Mateas – football player
- Larry O'Brien – politician
- Shweta Subram – singer
- Klea Scott – actress

== See also ==
- Education in Ontario
- List of high schools in Ontario
- List of Ottawa Carleton District School Board High Schools
