= Borden Farm, Ottawa =

Borden Farm
- Neighbourhood
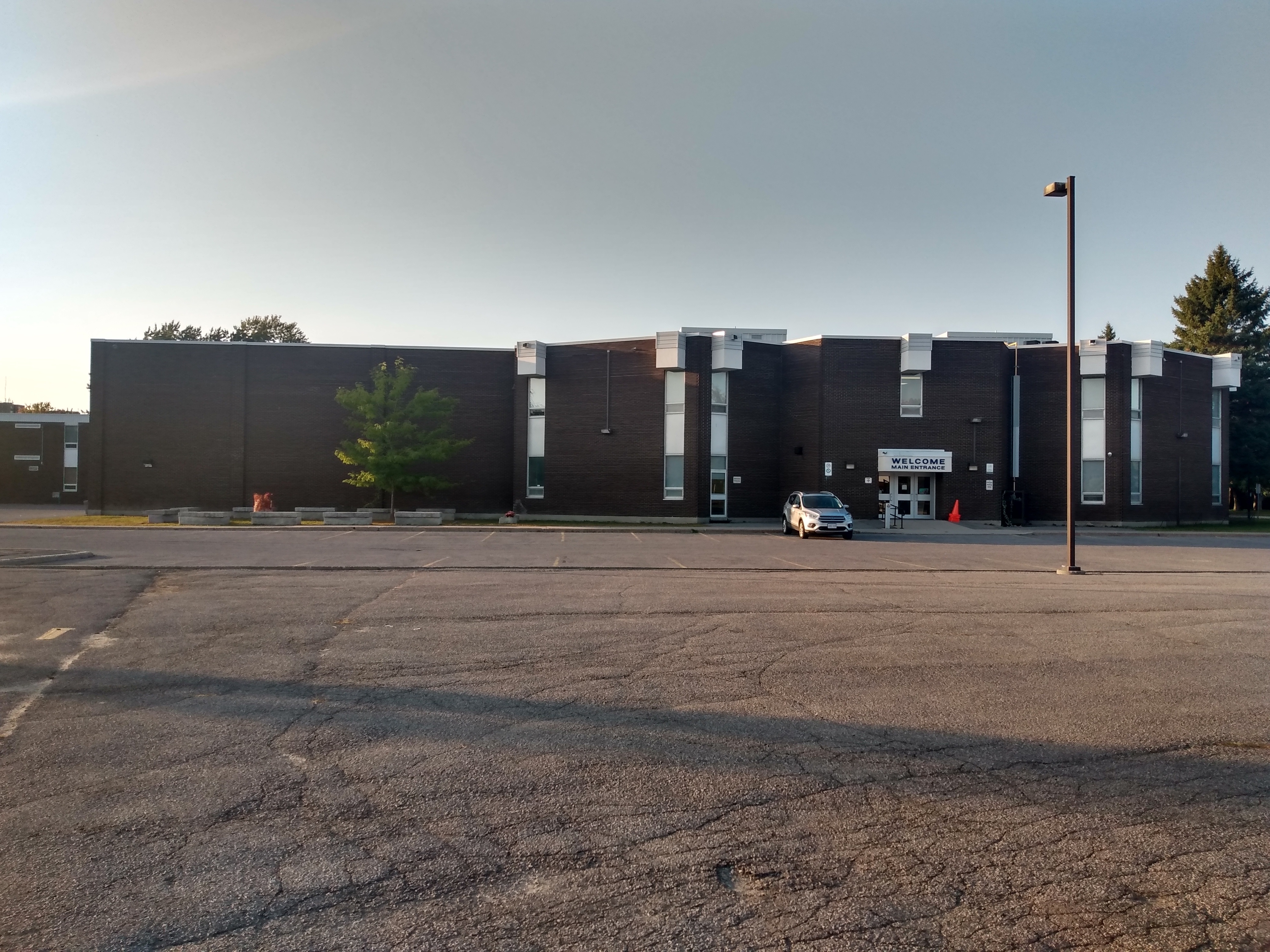
- Frank Ryan Catholic Intermediate School

- Location within Ottawa
- Coordinates: 45.351391°N 75.722451°W
- Country: Canada
- Province: Ontario
- City: Ottawa

Government
  - MPs: Anita Vandenbeld
  - MPPs: Chandra Pasma
  - Councillors: Sean Devine
  - Governing body: General Burns Community Association
  - President: Alexandra Kealey-Morin

Area
  - Total: 0.823 km^{2} (0.318 sq mi)
- Elevation: 90 m (300 ft)

Population (Canada 2016 Census)
  - Total: 2,668
  - Density: 3,240/km^{2} (8,400/sq mi)
- Time zone: Eastern (EST)
- Forward sortation area: K2E

Borden Farm is a neighbourhood in Knoxdale-Merivale Ward in Ottawa, Ontario, Canada. It is located in the former city of Nepean, which was amalgamated into Ottawa in 2001. It was built on the site of the former Borden Dairy Farm. The land was bought by the Canada Mortgage and Housing Corporation (CMHC) in 1959. The Borden farm community was built in 1967–1976 as a joint development of the CMHC and the Ontario Housing Corporation and features single-family homes with parks and bikeways placed behind the houses, instead of on the streets. There was more development in the 1980s and early 1990s.

The rough boundaries of the neighbourhood are Merivale Road to the west, Bowhill Avenue to the north, Nepean Creek to the south and Chesteron Drive to the east. According to the 2016 Canada Census, the population for this area was 2,668.

One of the housing developments found alongside the Borden Farm neighbourhood is Fisher Glen, built in the early 1980s. Other housing developments are Stewart Farm, Parkwood Hills and Carleton Heights.

It is home to four parks, shopping strips on Merivale, a small shopping strip on Viewmount Drive, and four schools Omer-Deslauriers High School (formerly J.S. Woodsworth High School), Century Public School, Laurier-Carrière Catholic Elementary School and Merivale High School. J. S. Woodsworth High School operated from 1973 until its closure in 2005. Merivale Mall is a short walking distance from the neighbourhood.

The Borden Farm Child Care Centre is located on Chesterton Drive.

== See also ==
- Dairy farming
- Nepean, Ontario
