= École secondaire publique Omer-Deslauriers =

Coordinates: 45.350232°N 75.716690°W

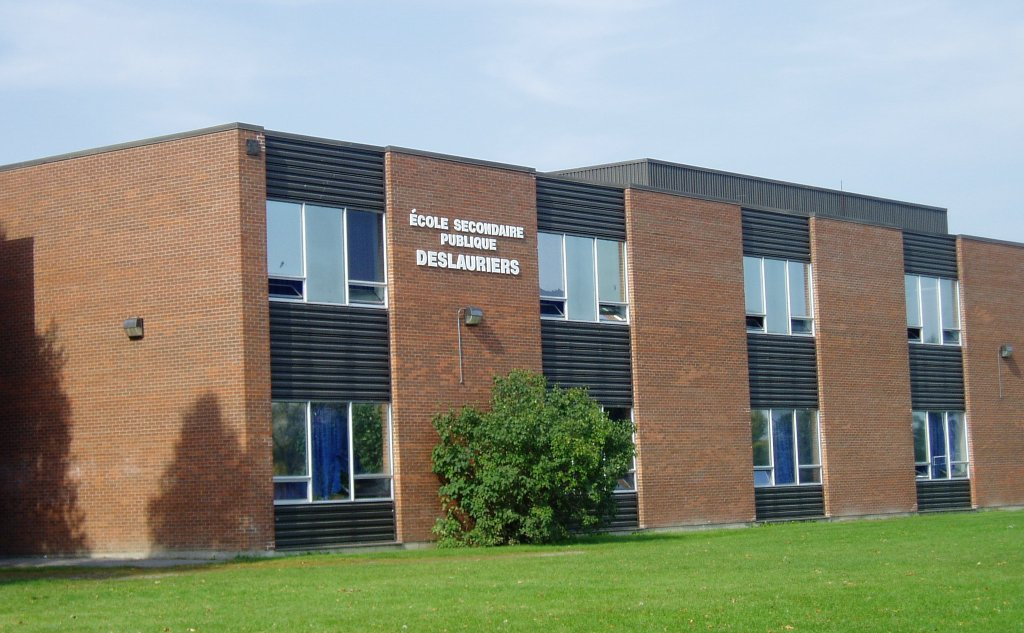

Location
- 159 Chesterton Drive, Ottawa, ON; Ottawa, Ontario, K2E 7E6; Canada

Information
- School type: High school
- Founded: 1992
- School board: CEPEO (Conseil des Écoles Publique de l'Est de l'Ontario)
- Principal: Thomas Rinshed
- Grades: 7-12
- Enrollment: roughly 600
- Language: French
- Area: Nepean (Ottawa West)
- Colours: green and yellow
- Team name: Les Phénix
- Website: omer-deslauriers.cepeo.on.ca

École secondaire publique Omer-Deslauriers is a French public school in the west of Ottawa, Ontario, Canada. It is named after the late Omer Deslauriers, an Ontarian educator and public serviceman who promoted establishment of several Francophone schools in Ottawa in the 1960s. Since August 2005, the school is located at 159 Chesterton Drive, and it enrols over 600 students as of 2024. The building was previously operated by the OCDSB, featuring the J.S. Woodsworth Secondary School until its closure in 2003.

Prior to August 2005, École secondaire publique Deslauriers was located at 1303 Fellows Road, near the OC Transpo Iris station. In August 2005, Deslauriers moved from Fellows Road to Chesterton Drive. In August 2009, the school's name was changed from Deslauriers to Omer-Deslauriers. The building at 1303 Fellows Road was repurposed as the current home of École élémentaire catholique Terre-des-Jeunes, a French Catholic elementary school operated by the CECCE.

The school is part of the International Baccalaureate's World Schools; it offers both the Middle Years Program (grades 7 to 10) and Diploma Program (grades 11 and 12). Students require a minimum of 80% in order to join and/or to stay in either program. The high school also offers a construction specialization and a communications programme. Other than that, this school offers two Specialist High Skills Major, one for construction and one for information and communication technologies.

In 2005–2006, the school's basketball team was the first francophone high school to win a bronze medal at the OFSAA AA Provincial Tournament. They also won the school spirit award. The school has many athletic programs, and like many Francophone schools has an improvisational comedy team.
