= St. Joseph High School (Ottawa) =

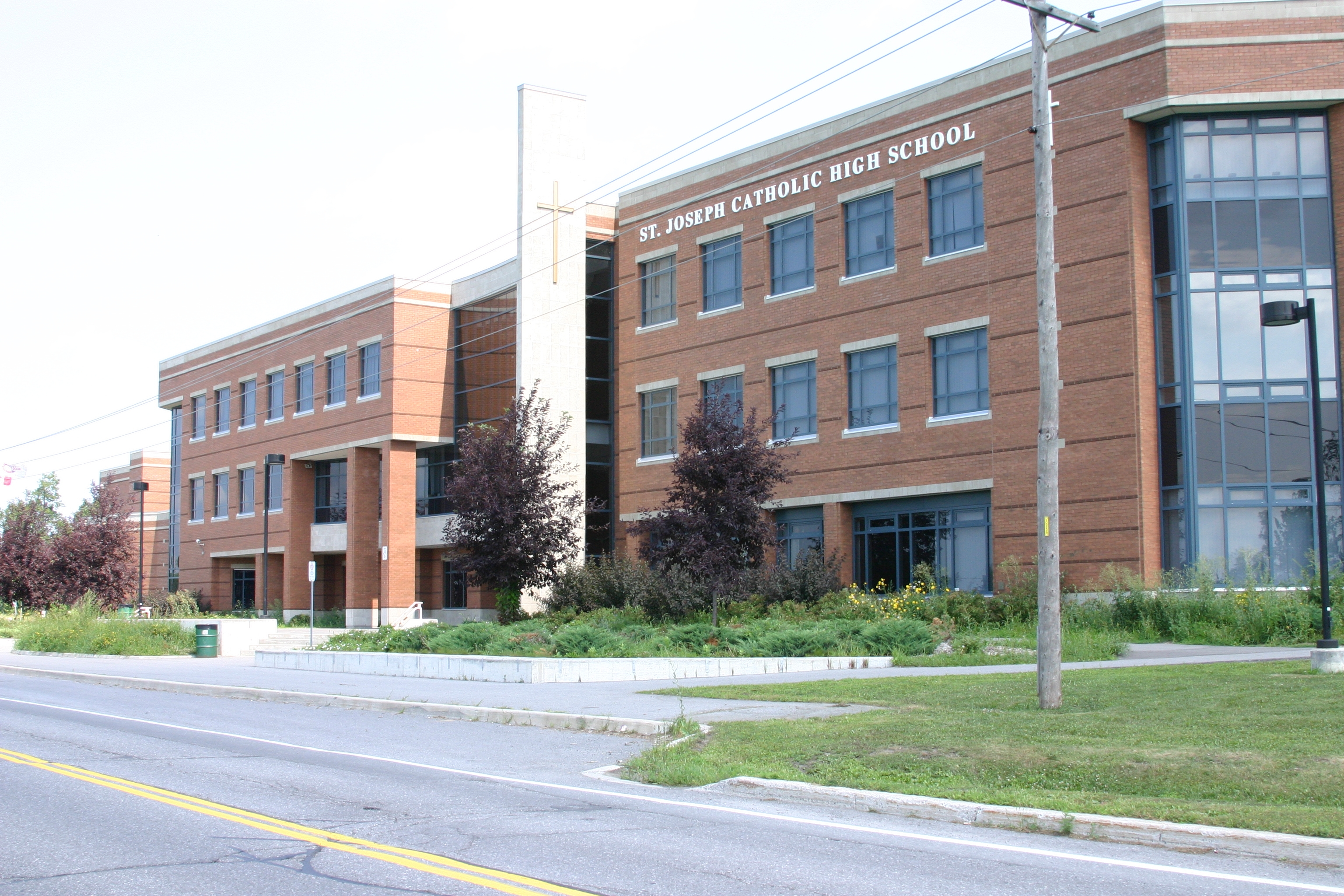

Location
- 3333 Greenbank Road; Ottawa, Ontario, K2J 4J1; Canada; 45.262459°N 75.740722°W

Information
- School type: High School
- Motto: Dedication Today, Success Tomorrow
- Founded: 2002
- School board: Ottawa Catholic School Board
- Principal: Daria Borland
- Grades: 7-12
- Enrolment: ~1900 (April 2021)
- Language: English, French
- Area: Nepean
- Colours: Blue and Gold
- Team name: Jaguars
- Website: sjh.ocsb.ca

St. Joseph High School is a Roman Catholic high school in the Barrhaven neighbourhood of Ottawa, Ontario, Canada. It is run by the Ottawa Catholic School Board. In athletics, the school teams are referred to as the St. Joseph Jaguars and the school mascot is a jaguar named McJagger. Commonly known as St. Joe's by the local community, St. Joe's has an enrolment of approximately 2500-3000 students, ranging from grades 7 to 12, as well as 115 staff members.

== History ==
St. Joseph High School opened on 11 October 2002 to account for the recent growth of the Ottawa suburb of Barrhaven. The only other Catholic high school in the area, Mother Teresa High School, was desperately overcrowded when St. Joe's opened for the 2002-03 school year. The school began with an enrolment of over 1000 students. By 2005, this number had exceeded 1500 students. The school bears the name of a former school on Broadview and a former school on Keyworth, which is now St. George Catholic Elementary School.

== Facilities ==
The building of St. Joseph High School followed the design of Edward J. Cuhaci, mimicking Holy Trinity High School and many other local schools. St. Joe's has three floors, which include a chapel, three gymnasiums, a learning commons, an exercise room, two art rooms, a kitchen, and laboratories for chemistry, biology, physics, and general science. There are 27 portables outside the school, as well as one football field, 5 basketball nets (one currently under construction), and a 400-metre track.

== Extra-curricular activities ==
=== Athletics ===
St. Joseph offers a wide variety of over 25 sports teams, ranging from football to badminton. In its beginning 3 years alone, St. Joe's sent 6 teams to the OFSAA provincial championships, with the 2005-06 Junior Cheerleading team even placing first in Ontario. Every year since its opening, the school has won the CAHPERD award for its educational programs.

=== Arts ===
St. Joseph offers Art, Music, and Drama classes to students in all grade levels. Photography classes are offered to students in grades 10 through 12. In grade 12, the Drama class becomes a production class, in which, students put on a play. This play is usually entered in the Cappies Critics and Awards Program. In June 2014, St. Joseph production of Suite Surrender, won the Cappies Award for the Best Play in the capital region for the 2013-2014 season, and also two other award for Best Marketing and Publicity, and Best Comic Actress in a Play. In June 2023, the school production of Arthur Miller`s The Crucible, won the Cappies Award for Best Play for the 2022-2023 season in the capital region as well as an award for Best Hair and Makeup, Featured Actor in a Female Role, and Supporting Actress. There is also an Improv Club, a 7/8 as well as a high school band, and after school music lessons. St. Joseph hosts an annual Coffee House, Arts Night, and a Battle of the Bands to showcase the school's talent. There are also school dances and activities such as JagJog offered throughout the year.

=== Intramurals ===
Grade 7 and 8, as well as Grades 9-12, are offered lunchtime intramurals in sports such as floor hockey, basketball, or dodgeball. For their efforts, St. Joseph has been given the CIRA award for its programs. High School intramurals are organised by the Recreational Leadership class, a class offered for grade 12 students at lunch.

== Notable alumni ==
- Elle Mills - YouTube vlogger
- Nicholas Baptiste - NHL hockey prospect
- MacKenzie Weegar - NHL player for the Utah Mammoth
- Serron Noel - NHL hockey prospect

== See also ==
- Education in Ontario
- List of secondary schools in Ontario
