= Notre Dame High School (Ottawa) =

Location
- 710 Broadview Avenue; Ottawa, Ontario, K2A 2M2; Canada; 45°22′43″N 75°45′22″W

Information
- School type: Ottawa Catholic High School
- Motto: "A place for everyone"
- Founded: Original: 1968 Relocation: 1994
- School board: Ottawa Catholic School Board
- Principal: Stephanie Glancey
- Grades: 7-12
- Enrollment: 1500
- Language: English, French
- Campus: Urban
- Colours: Silver and Blue
- Team name: Eagles
- Website: ndh.ocsb.ca

Notre Dame High School is a Catholic intermediate school and high school in Ottawa's west operated by the Ottawa Catholic School Board. The school is one of the first in the area to use a uniform.

The school is mainly two storeys throughout, except for the northeast corner where it features a basement in which the classrooms are almost exclusively for mathematics. It has an auditorium. It used to feature a single gymnasium in the centre of the school, but an extra one was built and opened in 2002–2003. Sports teams play under the moniker/nickname "Notre Dame Eagles" (formerly the Notre Dame Silver Eagles). The present site at 710 Broadview was once the site of Highland Park Technical School. Notre Dame High School moved into the 710 Broadview site during the mid-1990s, from their old site on the north west corner of the Holland Ave-Queensway intersection. That site is now Fisher Park Public School.

The high school operates on a standard semestered system for grades 7-12. Grade 7-8 students take their classes in a separate wing of the school.

== History ==
Initially, Notre Dame was located on Heron Road and was an all-girls school. In 1968, St Pat's School for boys moved to the campus and shared the chapel, theatre and other facilities with Notre Dame. In 1971, a few classes became blended from the 2 schools. In 1972, the senior grades from both schools were eliminated due to financial constraints, as there was not government funding for Catholic high schools in Ontario. In 1973, the nuns who ran Notre Dame were forced to close the doors. Students from Notre Dame had to attend public schools or go to St. Joes or St. Pius. A "new" Notre Dame was once again created after full funding for Ontario catholic schools was announced and the former St. Joseph and St. Raymond high schools (both grade 9-10) were merged into one school serving grade 9-OAC students. The school was relocated from its previous location on Holland Avenue in 1994.

== See also ==
- Education in Ontario
- List of secondary schools in Ontario
- List of Ottawa schools
