= Gloucester High School (Ottawa) =

Location
- 2060 Ogilvie Rd. Ottawa, Ontario, K1J 7N8; Canada; 45.439°N 75.600°W

Information
- Established: 1963
- School board: Ottawa Carleton District School Board
- Superintendent: Mary Jane Farrish
- Principal: Joe Ross
- Grades: 9-12
- Enrollment: 1,007
- Language: English
- Campus type: Suburban
- Colours: Royal Red, Black, Silver
- Mascot: Gator
- Team name: Gators
- Public transit access: OC Transpo routes 12, 24, 28
- Website: gloucesterhs.ocdsb.ca

Gloucester High School is a high school in the Beacon Hill neighbourhood of Ottawa, Ontario, Canada. The school was founded in 1963 by the former Gloucester School Board. The school can harbour approximately 1,600 students.

Gloucester High School provides education to grades 9 through 12 through a semestered curriculum as established by the Ontario Ministry of Education.

Gloucester High School has many successful sports teams. Athletic teams include basketball, ice hockey, Ultimate, rugby, soccer, track and field, volleyball, and wrestling.

== Notable alumni ==
- Robert Bockstael (actor, director, writer)
- Horst Bulau (ski jumper)
- James Duthie (sportscaster)
- Grace Lynn Kung (actress)
- Norm Macdonald (comedian)
- Robert Walker (animator)
- Aaron Ward (hockey player)
- John Morris (curler)
- Runa Reta (squash player)

== See also ==
- Education in Ontario
- List of secondary schools in Ontario
