= Canadian Tire Centre station =

Transit station in Ottawa, Ontario, Canada

Canadian Tire Centre
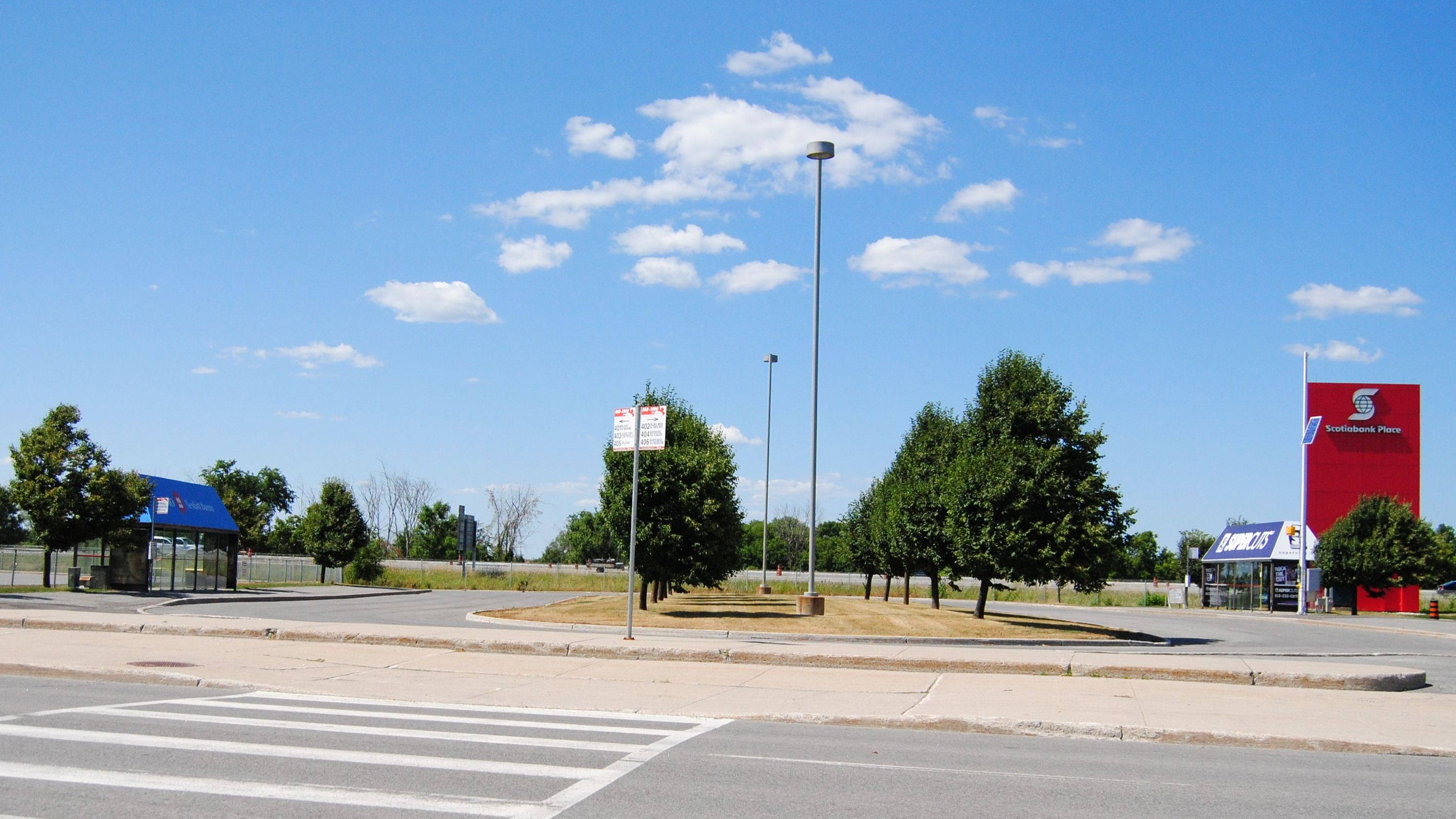
- Previously named Scotiabank Place station in 2012

General information
- Location: Cyclone Taylor Blvd. Ottawa, Ontario; Canada
- Coordinates: 45°17′55″N 75°55′35″W
- Bus stands: 2
- Bus operators: OC Transpo

Other information
- Station code: 3059

History
- Former names: Scotiabank Place
Location

Canadian Tire Centre is an OC Transpo bus station in Ottawa, Ontario. It is located in the north parking lot at the Canadian Tire Centre in the western suburb of Kanata.

In the past, the station had a park and ride facility served weekdays between the hours of 5:45 a.m. and 6:30 p.m. The parking facilities were permanently closed in March of 2024 due to low usage.

There is an on-ramp to eastbound Highway 417 for buses from the station.

== Service ==
The following routes serve Canadian Tire Centre station as of April 27, 2025:

Key
Line 1 (O-Train) Line 2 (O-Train) Line 4 (O-Train)	O-Train
E1	Shuttle Express
R1 R2 R4	O-Train replacement bus routes
N75	Night routes
40 12	Frequent routes
99 162	Local routes
275	Connexion routes
303	Shopper routes
405	Event routes
646	School routes
STO	Société de transport de l'Outaouais routes
Additional info: Line 1: Confederation Line; Line 2: Trillium Line; Line 4: Airport Link; Routes 5 to 199: Custom routing that that connects to Line 1 and/or 2; Routes 200 to 299: Connexion (peak-period only routes that connect to the O-Train); Routes 301 to 305: Shopper Routes (limited rural service); Routes 404 to 406: Canadian Tire Centre events; Routes 450 to 456: Lansdowne Park events; Routes 600 to 699: School Routes; Route R1: replaces Line 1 when it is out of service; Route R2: replaces Line 2 when it is out of service; Route R4: replaces Line 4 when it is out of service; Routes N39 to N98: night service (replaces Line 1 and N98 replaces Line 4); White backgrounds: limited service; Last two digits represent service area: 00s and 10s – Central; 20s – Gloucester; 30s – Orléans; 40s – Ottawa East; 50s – Ottawa West; 60s – Kanata, Stittsville; 70s – Barrhaven; 80s – Nepean; 90s – South Keys

Stop	Routes
2A Event	404 405 406
2B Local	162
#1839 Cyclone Taylor Blvd.	162

== See also ==
- Ottawa Rapid Transit
