= Longfields-Davidson Heights Secondary School =

Location
- 149 Berrigan Drive, Nepean, Ottawa, Ontario; Canada; 45°16′46″N 75°44′28″W

Information
- Type: Public
- Established: 2009
- School district: 9
- Principal: Caroline Kitchen
- Staff: 200+
- Grades: 7-12
- Enrollment: 4000+
- Colours: Purple, black, gray, and white
- Mascot: Otis the Raven
- School Board: OCDSB
- Superintendent: Shawn Lehman
- Website: ldhss.ocdsb.ca

Longfields-Davidson Heights Secondary School is a public school in Barrhaven, a suburb of Ottawa, Ontario, Canada. It was founded in 2009.

== Faculty ==
The school opened in September 2009 providing services for grades 7 to 12. The staff has grown to over 250 and has a student population of ~4000. In 2013, it was announced that Longfields would be receiving a 15.2 million dollar expansion to accommodate for the growing student population.

== Feeder schools ==
- Farley Mowat Public School
- Berrigan Elementary School
- Adrienne Clarkson Elementary School
- Chapman Mills Public School
- Jockvale Elementary School
- Barrhaven Public School

== Athletics ==
Sources:

- Rugby
- Field hockey
- Cross country running
- Golf
- Tennis
- Soccer
- Basketball
- Volleyball
- Curling
- Alpine ski
- Hockey
- Nordic ski
- Wrestling
- Badminton
- Touch football
- Ultimate frisbee
- Baseball
- Track and field
- Pickleball
- Lacrosse
- Ping-Pong

=== The Raven's Call ===
The Raven's Call is a school sanctioned monthly digital publication that was founded in 2021. The publication is currently written and published by a team of upwards of 35 students and is edited and supervised by two staff members.

== See also ==
- Education in Ontario
- List of secondary schools in Ontario
