= St. Pius X High School (Ottawa) =

Location
- 1481 Fisher Avenue; Ottawa, Ontario, K2C 1X4; Canada; 45°21′55″N 75°42′44″W

Information
- School type: Separate high school
- Motto: To establish all things in Christ
- Religious affiliation: Catholic
- Founded: 1958; 68 years ago
- School board: Ottawa Catholic School Board
- Superintendent: Nicola Benton
- Area trustee: Luka Luketic-Buyers
- Principal: Philip Capobianco
- Grades: 9 – 12
- Enrollment: 833 (March 2020)
- Language: English, French
- Colour
- Mascot: Captain Pius
- Team name: X-Men
- Website: pih.ocsb.ca

St. Pius X High School is a secondary school in Ottawa, Ontario, Canada. Founded in 1958, the school, operated by the publicly funded Ottawa Catholic School Board, teaches grades 9-12. As of March, enrollment stood at around 833 students.

== Incidents ==
=== School shooting ===
St. Pius X High School was the scene of Canada's second school shooting on October 27, 1975. The gunman, Robert Poulin, an 18-year-old St. Pius student, opened fire on his classmates with a 12 gauge shotgun, killing one and wounding five before killing himself. Poulin had raped and stabbed 17-year-old Kim Rabot to death prior to the incident. He also attempted to burn down the house after he killed Rabot. A book entitled Rape of a Normal Mind was written about the incident.

=== Screwdriver fight ===
On October 16, 2017, a brawl between students belonging mainly to the Syrian and Italo-Canadian cultural groups occurred at Steve MacLean Park. One student attempted to use a screwdriver as a weapon, but was unsuccessful in causing injury. 47 students were sent home for the day, while eight faced longer suspensions.

== Notable alumni ==
- Dan Aykroyd - actor
- Brendan Bell - National Hockey League player
- Rick Chiarelli - Ottawa City Councillor
- Keith Egli - Ottawa City Councillor
- Jim Foley - Canadian Football League player
- Vincent Lam - writer, Bloodletting and Miraculous Cures; winner of the 2006 Giller Prize
- Jesse Palmer - retired National Football League player, host of The Bachelor, ESPN football analyst
- Mark Sutcliffe - 59th mayor of Ottawa
- Chris Therien - retired National Hockey League player (non-graduate)
- Jason York - retired National Hockey League player (non-graduate), Team 1200 (Ottawa) radio host

== See also ==
- Education in Ontario
- List of secondary schools in Ontario
