= Collège catholique Samuel-Genest =

Location
- 704 Carsons Road; Ottawa, Ontario, K1K 2H3; Canada; 45.442648°N 75.630108°W

Information
- School type: French Catholic High School
- Motto: "À la poursuite de l'excellence" (Translation: "In Pursuit of Excellence")
- Founded: 1979
- School board: Conseil des écoles catholiques du Centre-Est
- School number: 695955
- Administrator: Karine Fortin
- Principal: Julie Azzi
- Grades: 7-12
- Language: French
- Area: Vanier/Gloucester
- Colours: Green, White and Blue
- Mascot: Sammy la grenouille
- Team name: Les Laser de Samuel-Genest
- Website: samuel-genest.ecolecatholique.ca/fr/

Collège catholique Samuel-Genest (CCSG) is a French Catholic junior high and high school in Ottawa, Ontario, Canada, under the Conseil des écoles catholiques du Centre-Est (CECCE). In 2004, the CCSG high school fused with the junior high schools of Pauline-Vanier and Vision Jeunesse (both in Ottawa, Ontario). A school uniform is mandatory for the students.

== History ==
In September 1979, CCSG opened with 71 students, in two classes of Grade 9 and one class of Grade 10. Grade 11 classes were created the next year, and a Grade 12 class in 1982. A Grade 13 class was offered beginning in 1984.

Samuel-Genest has occupied three different locations in Ottawa. First on Smyth Road, then to Church Street and finally on Carson's Road.

== Concentrations ==
=== Concentration Scientifique ===
CCSG offers enriched science courses from 9th to 12th grade. It is the only high-school in the Ottawa region to offer a Concentration Scientifique (Scientific Concentration).

=== 7th & 8th grade concentrations ===
In the 2006–2007 school year, the school launched two programs exclusively to Grades 7–8: Sam'Artiste, an arts program, and Sam'Sportif, a sports program. There is also the Sam'Enrichit program, which offers enriched courses with additional subjects.

For Grades 7 and 8, the school offers a precursor to the Concentration Scientifique known as the Pré-Concentration Scientifique.

== See also ==
- Education in Ontario
- List of secondary schools in Ontario
