= St. Patrick's High School (Ottawa) =

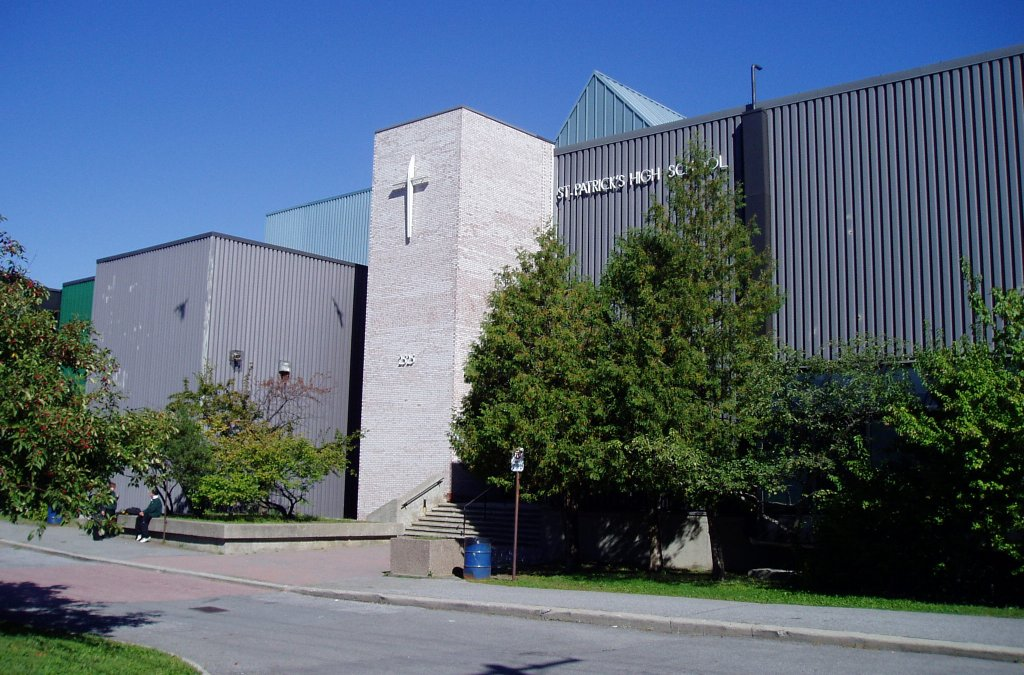
- Image of school

Location
- 2525 Alta Vista Drive; Alta Vista Drive; Ottawa, Ontario, K1V 7T3; Canada; 45.377949°N 75.660074°W

Information
- School type: Separate high school
- Motto: Religio Alit Artes
- Religious affiliation: Catholic
- Founded: 1929
- School board: Ottawa Catholic School Board
- Superintendent: Sean Power
- Area trustee: Mark Mullan
- Principal: Meagan Morris; Vice Principals; Paula Joly; Paul Tamburrini; Jade Lachance
- Grades: 7-12
- Enrollment: 1290
- Language: English/French
- Hours in school day: 6:10 (08:30-14:40 ET)
- Colours: Green and Gold
- Mascot: St Pat's Fighting Irish
- Team name: Irish
- Website: sph.ocsb.ca
- Last updated: 8 OCT 2025

St. Patrick's High School, located in Ottawa, Ontario, Canada, is a Catholic high school publicly funded under the Ontario school system as part of the Ottawa Catholic School Board. It was founded in 1929 by the Missionary Oblates of Mary Immaculate.

== History ==
In 1929, St. Patrick's College High School 135 students and 7 teachers were housed in St. Joseph Parish Hall, a two-storey, red brick hall on Laurier Avenue East in Ottawa. St. Patrick's High School has had a crest and motto since its founding in 1929. The school logo includes the name of the school, St. Patrick's High School, and the motto “Religio Alit Artes.” The armorial bearings of St. Patrick's High School in Ottawa was “entered in the Public Register of Arms, Flags and Badges of Canada” and presented to the school on Wednesday, March 6, 2002.

In 1930, St. Patrick's College High School moved to join the new St. Patrick's College at a joint campus of 392 students and a faculty of 22 facing Echo Drive and the Rideau Canal. The Echo Drive facility housed the school for almost four decades. Masses were held in the college chapel until the church was built in 1931. From 1930–1964, St. Patrick's College High School took in boarders from the Ottawa Valley area as well as from farther afield. The Echo Drive facility currently houses Immaculata High School.

The Patrician, the first St. Patrick's High School newspaper, was published in 1934.

The Oblates’ active involvement in the administration of the school from 1929 came to an end in 1973. The names of 155 Oblates of Mary Immaculate in St. Peter's Province, who taught at St. Patrick's High School during the period 1929-1973 are engraved on a plaque that was mounted on an Oblate cross and presented to the students and staff of St. Patrick's High School on March 17, 1986.

The school was renamed St. Jude's Junior High School for the 1972–73 school year. In 1973, the school was renamed St. Patrick's Junior High School because the higher grades were no longer accommodated. The school was renamed St. Patrick's High School, a full-fledged secondary school in 1986. St. Patrick's High School remained at the 1485 Heron Road site until 1993, when it moved to 2525 Alta Vista Drive, then the location of École Secondaire Charlebois of the French Public School Board. During the 1993-94 school year, the building was shared by the two schools, after which Charlebois was closed and students transferred to other schools including De La Salle.

86 former students of St. Patrick's were killed in World War II.

In 1968 St. Patrick's College became affiliated with Carleton University. St. Patrick's College High School relocated to the Campanile Campus at 1485 Heron Road, where St. Patrick's shared the location with Notre Dame High School, run by the Sisters of the Congregation of Notre Dame. In 1968, the school change its name from St. Patrick's College High School to St. Patrick's High School.

== Athletics ==
The St Pat's Irish play in the NCSSAA (National Capital Secondary Schools Athletic Association).

In September 1989, the “St. Pat’s Fighting Irish” hit the field for the first time since 1975, defeating Laurentian High School in the process. The school celebrated its 75th anniversary in 2004. To mark the occasion, a video was produced by Roy Ketcheson.

== Notable alumni ==
- Dan Aykroyd (born 1952), Canadian-American actor
- Christo Bilukidi (born 1989), NFL player
- Ernie Calcutt (1932–1984), radio sports commentator and broadcaster for the Ottawa Rough Riders
- Robert Chiarelli, First Mayor of the Regional Municipality of Ottawa-Carleton (2001–2006)
- Neville Gallimore (born 1997), NFL player
- Wilbert Keon, Senator, founder of the Ottawa Heart Institute and officer of the Order of Canada
- Jim Kyte, professional hockey player for the Ottawa Senators, first deaf player in the NHL
- Jesse Luketa (born 1999), NFL player
- Ali Mahmoud, basketball player for the Lebanon national basketball team who took part in World Basketball Championships in 2006 and 2010
- Pat Marsden (1936-2006), CTV sportscaster; weeknight sports anchor, CFTO-TV Toronto
- Dalton McGuinty, 24th Premier of Ontario and leader of the Ontario Liberal Party (1996–2012)
- David McGuinty, Minister of Public Safety and Member of Parliament
- Maureen McTeer, author and wife of former Prime Minister, Joe Clark
- Michael O'Brien (born 1948), author
- Marial Shayok (born 1995), first NBA pick ever from Ottawa, played in the NBA and currently plays in the Israeli Basketball Premier League
- John Turner (1929–2020), 17th Prime Minister of Canada
- Valdy (Valdemar Horsdal; born 1945), Juno Award winning folk artist

== See also ==
- Education in Ontario
- List of secondary schools in Ontario
