= St. Matthew High School (Ottawa) =

St. Matthew Catholic High School

Location
- 6550 Bilberry Drive; Ottawa, Ontario, K1C 2S9; Canada; 45°28′49.73″N 75°31′56.69″W

Information
- School type: Catholic high school
- Motto: "People together with purpose!”
- Founded: 1981
- School board: Ottawa Catholic School Board
- Superintendent: Brent Hopkins
- Area trustee: Joanne MacEwan
- Principal: Nicola Whitehouse
- Grades: 7 to 12
- Enrollment: 605 (2021–2022)
- Language: English
- Area: Ottawa
- Colours: Yellow and black
- Mascot: Tiger
- Team name: Tigers
- Website: mth.ocsb.ca

St. Matthew Catholic High School is located at 6550 Bilberry Drive in the Orléans district of Ottawa, Ontario, Canada. The current principal is Nicola Whitehouse.

The school broke the Guinness world record for largest unbroken human chain, called the Bear Hug. The event was in support of Cancer research.

== Bear Hug ==
=== Bear Hug 1 ===
This event was documented in the 2005 edition of the Guinness Book of World Records. On 23 April 2004, St. Matthew Catholic High School made it into the Guinness Book of World Records with the world's largest bear hug, an endeavour led by school Principal André Potvin, and an achievement which resulted on 9 June 2004 being officially declared "St. Matthew High School Day" by Ottawa Mayor, Bob Chiarelli. The world's largest bear hug involved 5,117 students hugging for ten seconds. This world record was tied in with the school's fundraising for cancer, as students and staff, with the support of local businesses and residents, raised more than $108,000 in April of that year, surpassing the previous provincial record of $40,000 and setting a Canadian record for cancer fundraising by a high school.

=== Bear Hug 2 ===
Bear Hug 2 in 2008 unsuccessfully attempted to break the Guinness Record (then held by the citizens of New Mexico at 6,553). Funds were again raised in support of cancer research.

=== Bear Hug 3 ===
Bear Hug 3 in May 2010 raised over $500,000 for cancer patient care and research and set a new Guinness World Record of 10,554 participants, which was still standing in 2023.

== Sports ==
There are 19 teams for high school students and 15 teams for grade 7 and 8 students.

- The senior boys' basketball team won the Ontario Federation of School Athletic Associations (OFSAA) AAA provincial title in 2009.
- The girls' basketball team won the OFSAA AA title in 2014.
- The varsity football team won the Metro Bowl (OFSAA) AAA provincial title in 2016.

== See also ==
- Education in Ontario
- List of secondary schools in Ontario
