= Place d'Orléans station =

Place d'Orléans
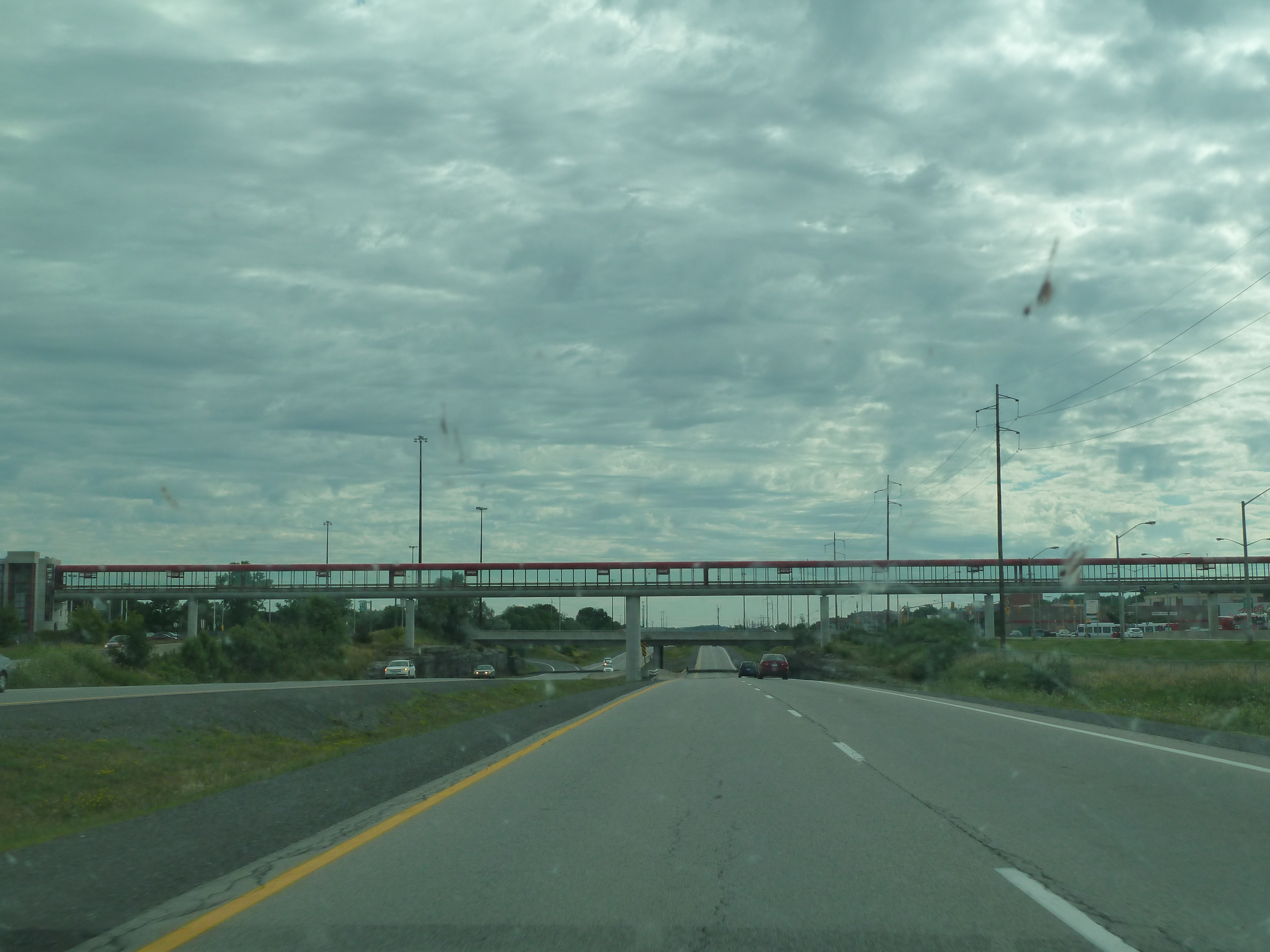

General information
- Location: Orléans, Ontario, Canada
- Coordinates: 45°28′43″N 75°31′08″W
- Owner: OC Transpo

Construction
- Parking: 568 spaces
- Accessible: Yes

History
- Opened: 1994 (Transitway)
- Opening: 2026 (O-Train)

Services
Preceding station	OC Transpo	Following station
Jeanne d'Arc toward Blair	Route 39	Trim toward Millennium

Future services
Preceding station	OC Transpo	Following station
Convent Glen toward Tunney's Pasture	Line 1 Opens 2026	Trim Terminus
Convent Glen toward Moodie	Line 3 Opens 2027	Trim Terminus
Location

Place d’Orléans station is a Transitway station in the suburb of Orléans in the former city of Gloucester in Ottawa, Ontario, Canada. The station opened in 1994, just off Regional Road 174 and Champlain Street right next to Place d'Orléans Shopping Centre. It is the main transit hub between local routes in Orléans and route 39 (previously known as route 95).

In 2026, as part of Stage 2 of Ottawa's light-rail transit system, Line 1 will be extended east from Blair station to Trim station, making Place d'Orléans one of the 16 new LRT stations on the alignment. The current Transitway station is going to be converted to light rail, connecting the city from east to west.

There is a park and ride lot located north of Regional Road 174 off Champlain street. This lot is accessible from the main station by a covered pedestrian overpass and is also serviced by Route 39 as it departs towards Blair via the Transitway. This parking lot reaches capacity on a daily basis, and, overflow parking is allowed at the south-west corner of the Place d'Orléans Shopping Centre. Trim station and the associated park and ride lot were constructed to alleviate pressure on the Orléans park and ride lot.

Peak period trips on Route 39 departing from Trim station do not serve the station itself, and instead, access the park and ride directly from Regional Road 174 on its way downtown.

During the summer, Route 139 provides special weekend service to Petrie Island Beach, located just off Trim Road.

== Service ==
The following routes serve Place d’Orléans station:

Place d'Orléans station service
West O-Train	Under construction (opening in 2026)
East O-Train	Under construction (opening in 2026)
A Off only	
B East, South	R1 (future) 31 32 33 35 36 39 221 234 302 639 678
C Unused	
D Off only	
E Local, West	R1 (future) 31 32 33 35 36 38 39 138 139 237 302 405 455 634 635 678
F West; Park and Ride	32 33 35 39 221 234 405 455
G Unused	

=== Notes ===
- Route 33 does not travel west of Place d'Orléans during certain mid-day trips and on weekends.
- Route 35 does not travel west of Place d'Orléans outside of peak hours during weekdays.
- Route 139 only operates on weekends during the summer months.
