= Notre-Dame-des-Champs, Ontario =

Coordinates: 45.429°N 75.486°W

Notre-Dame-des-Champs
- Rural Community
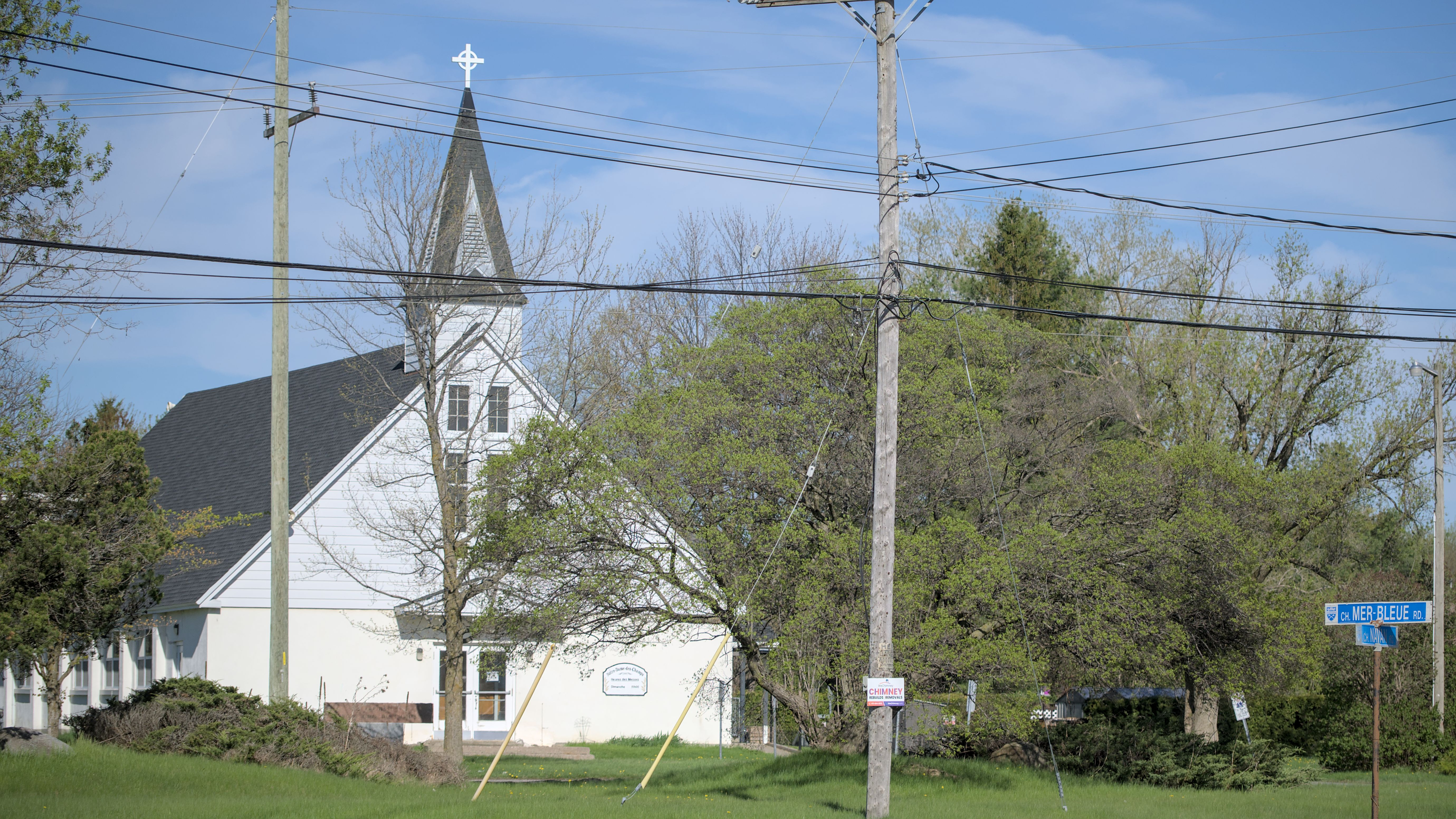
- Paroisse Notre-Dame-des-Champs

- Location in Ottawa
- Country: Canada
- Province: Ontario
- City: Ottawa

Government
  - MPs: Marie-France Lalonde
  - MPPs: Stephen Blais
  - Councillors: Catherine Kitts

Population (2006)
  - Total: 1,375
- Time zone: UTC-5 (Eastern (EST))

Notre-Dame-des-Champs (Our Lady of the Fields) is a rural community on the northern edge of Mer Bleue in Ottawa, Ontario, Canada at the intersection of Navan Road and Mer Bleue Road. Prior to 2001 amalgamation, it was on the border between Cumberland and Gloucester. Today, in the Orléans South-Navan Ward. The population was approximately 1375 in 2006.

== Transportation ==
As of 2024, the community is served by two OC Transpo routes. Route 228 operates three trips per day in each direction, connecting Notre-Dame-des-Champs, Navan, and Sarsfield to Blair Station. Route 302 is a Shopper route that provides one free trip in each direction on Tuesdays, connecting Notre-Dame-des-Champs, Navan, Sarsfield, and Cumberland to shopping centres including Place d'Orléans, the Gloucester Centre, and the St-Laurent Centre.
