= Jeanne d'Arc station =

Bus station in Ottawa, Canada

Jeanne d'Arc
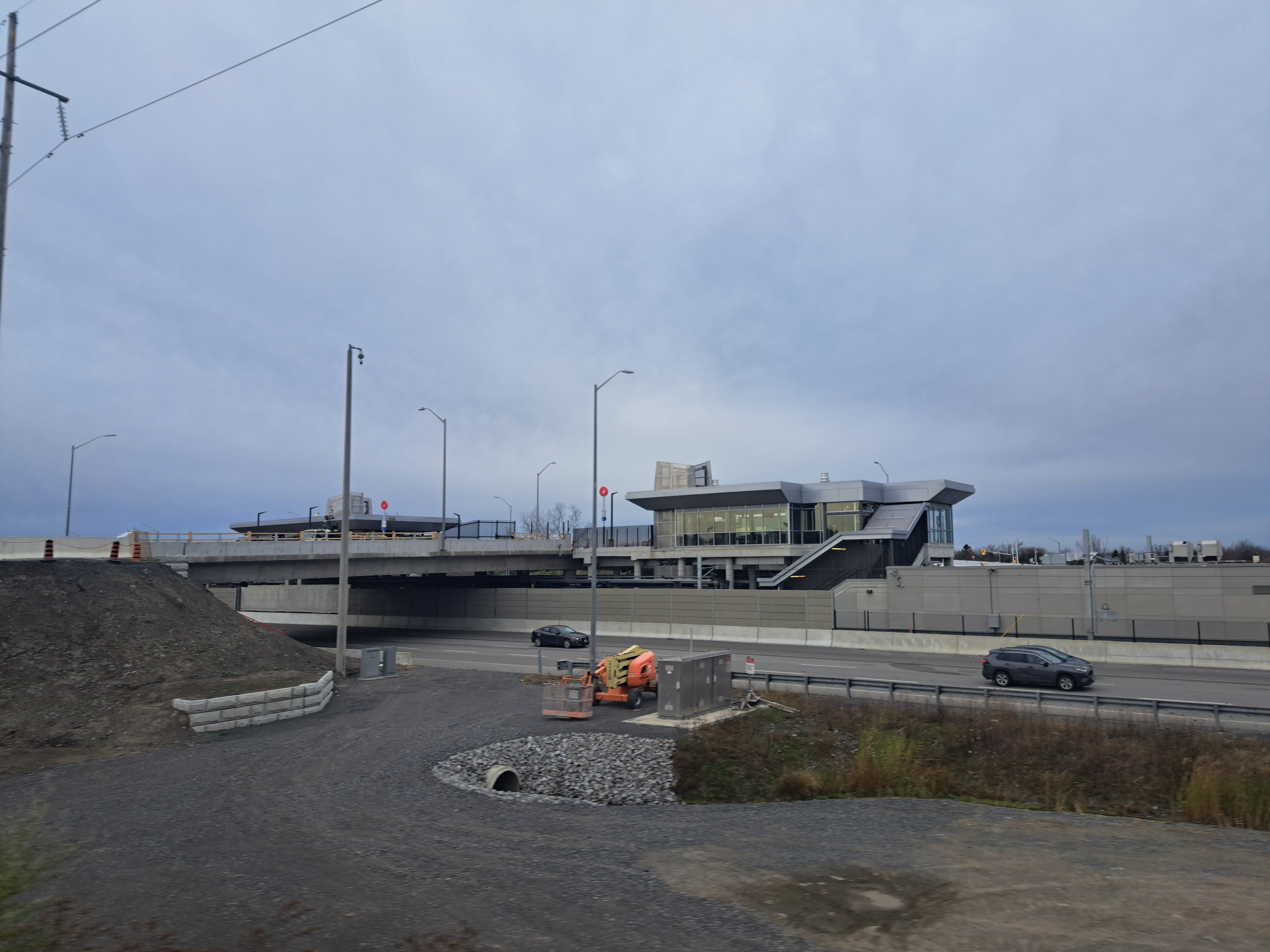

General information
- Coordinates: 45.4690°N 75.5462°W
- Owner: OC Transpo

Construction
- Parking: 60 spaces
- Accessible: Yes

History
- Opened: 2006 (official station), 2009 (Transitway)
- Opening: 2026 (O-Train)

Services
Preceding station	OC Transpo	Following station
Montréal toward Blair	Route 39	Place d'Orléans toward Millennium

Future services
Preceding station	OC Transpo	Following station
Montréal toward Tunney's Pasture	Line 1 Opens 2026	Convent Glen toward Trim
Montréal toward Moodie	Line 3 Opens 2027	Convent Glen toward Trim
Location

Jeanne d'Arc station is a stop on Ottawa's Transitway and future O-Train station. It is located at the interchange of Regional Road 174 and Jeanne d'Arc Boulevard in Orléans in the east end of the city of Ottawa.

In 2026, as part of Stage 2 of Ottawa's light-rail transit system, Line 1 will be extended east from Blair station to Trim station, making Jeanne d'Arc one of the 16 new LRT stations on the alignment. The current Transitway station is going to be converted to light rail, connecting the city from east to west.

While this stop existed for several years as a connection point between local routes in Orléans and Route 95 (now Route 39), OC Transpo had identified it as an official station starting in Fall 2006 and the construction of a new transit station by 2009, according to its transitway map.

A small park and ride facility opened in 2006 south of the eastbound lanes near Youville Drive. However, one must travel across the Jeanne d'Arc overpass to get access to the westbound stop.

== Service ==
The following routes serve Jeanne d’Arc station:

Type	Routes
West O-Train	Under construction (opening in 2026)
East O-Train	Under construction (opening in 2026)
1A Local	30 34 38 237
1B Transitway (East)	R1 (future) 32 33 35 39 234
2A Transitway (West)	R1 (future) 30 32 33 34 35 38 39 234 237 405 455
3A Local	31 138
3B Local (South)	31 138
4A North	30 31 138
4B Local	34 31 38 138 237
