= Navan, Ontario =

Neighbourhood of Ottawa

Coordinates: 45°25′15″N 75°25′35″W

Navan
- Village
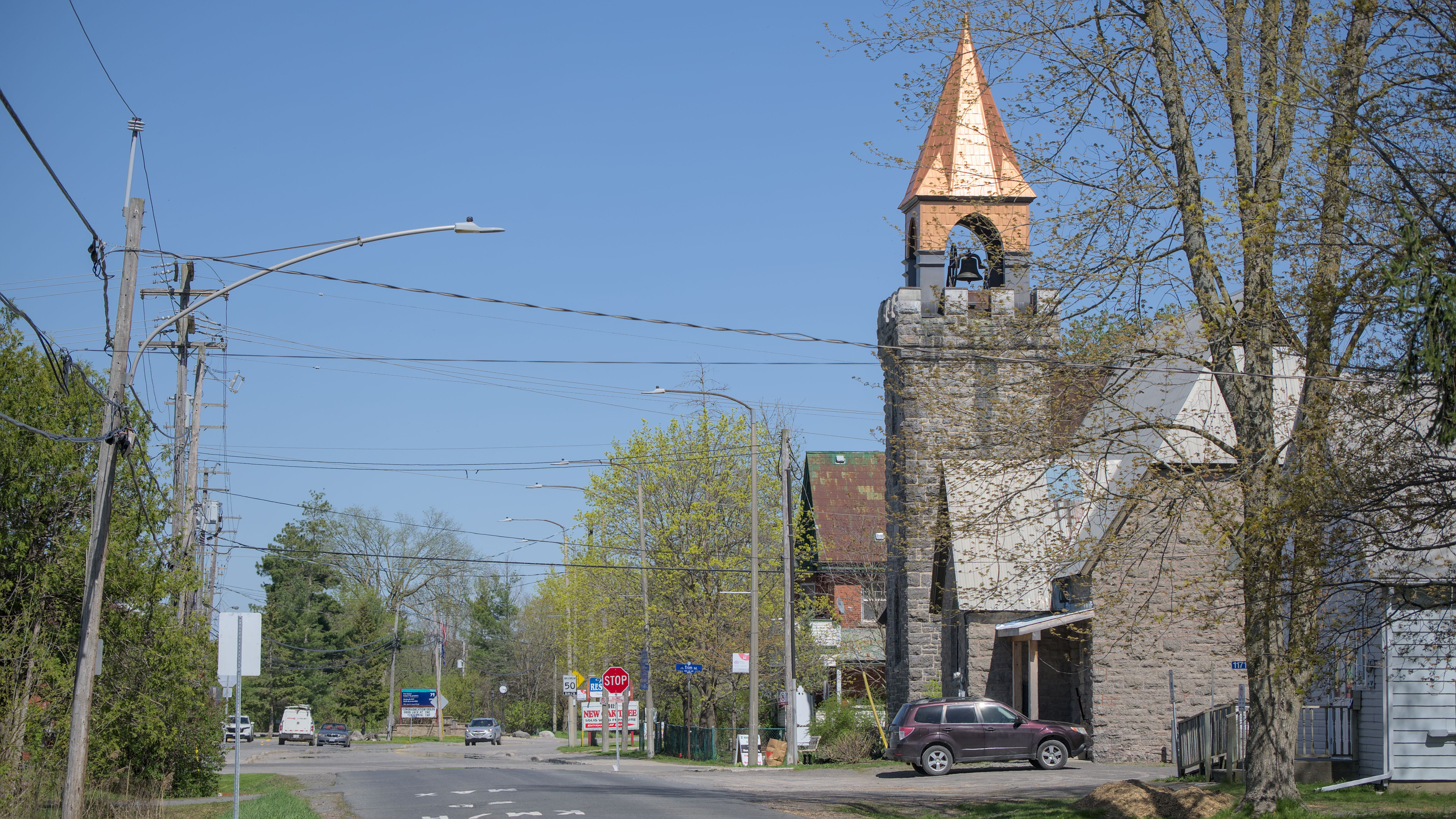
- Looking east on Smith Road

- Country: Canada
- Province: Ontario
- City: Ottawa
- Post office: 1861

Government
  - MPs: Giovanna Mingarelli
  - MPPs: Stéphane Sarrazin
  - Councillors: Catherine Kitts

Population (2021)
  - Total: 1,864
- Canada 2021 Census
- Time zone: UTC-5 (Eastern (EST))

Navan is a community in Orléans South-Navan Ward in Ottawa, Ontario, Canada. It is located 25 kilometres (16 mi) east of downtown Ottawa and the centre of the town is Colonial Road (Ottawa Road #28) and Trim Road. It is located southeast of the suburban community of Orleans. About 1,864 people live in the vicinity of Navan as of 2021.

== History ==
Navan was first settled in the early 1800s. It was named after the town of Navan in County Meath, Ireland, which was the hometown of Michael O'Meara, an early settler that established the post office.

Before its amalgamation with the City of Ottawa in 2001, Navan was located within Cumberland Township.

The Navan Fair is an annual event that takes place in August. It is held in the fairground off Colonial Road. The fair features midway rides, live music, concession stands, demolition derbies, exhibitions, a parade, and various shows. The first fair took place in 1946. The admission for the first year of the fair was 35 cents for adults, 25 cents for children, and 25 cents for cars.

The village was served by a railway station located on Smith Road east of Milton Road from 1898 to 1974. This former Canadian Pacific rail corridor has since been abandoned, and the right-of-way has been converted to a rail trail.

== Notable landmarks ==
- JT Bradley’s, general store originally built in 1898 but rebuilt in 1949 after it burned down in 1948.
- Navan Memorial Centre, built in 1955 and completely rebuilt in 1982 after the 1955 arena was condemned.
- OC Transpo Park and Ride, located at the Navan Memorial Centre.
- Navan Curling Club, opened in 1990.
- Heritage Public School, officially opened on September 5, 2006, to replace Meadowview Public School, which closed in 2004.
- The Shaw House, located on the northwest corner of Trim Road and Smith Road, is a historic house built in 1876.
- The Domes, installed in the fairgrounds, originally used for the Papal Mass when Pope John Paul II visited Canada.
- St Mary's Anglican church constructed of local limestone and completed in 1898.
- Navan Vars United Church dedicated in 1926.

== Notable people ==
- Érik Bédard, professional baseball player
- Scott Campbell, ice hockey winger
- Wally Kilrea, ice hockey winger
- Genevieve Thauvette, photographer

== Transportation ==
As of 2024, the community is served by two OC Transpo routes. Route 228 operates three trips per day in each direction, connecting Navan and Sarsfield to Blair Station. Route 302 is a Shopper route that provides one free trip in each direction on Tuesdays, connecting Navan, Sarsfield, and Cumberland to shopping centres including Place d'Orléans, the Gloucester Centre, and the St-Laurent Centre.
