= Avalon, Ottawa =

Neighbourhood in Orleans, Ontario, Canada

Coordinates: 45.458°N 75.468°W

Avalon is a neighbourhood located in Orleans, a suburb in the east end of Ottawa, Ontario, Canada. Prior to amalgamation in 2001, the area was in the City of Cumberland.

This neighbourhood was non-existent until the late 1990s when the urban sprawl intensified in the east end. Avalon quickly developed in the area is now bordered to the north by Innes Road, to the east by a line following (from north to south) Portobello Boulevard to Brian Coburn Boulevard to Trim Road, the west by Mer Bleue Road and to the south by Wall Road. According to the 2011 Canadian census, this area had a population of 12,455.

The development of the area slowed when the developer had to return to previously built houses to fix foundations. Some have criticized the builder for building on swampland without proper engineering.

At the intersection of Innes and Tenth Line, a large commercial zone with several department and big-box stores developed in conjunction of the residential boom of Avalon. This new district displaced some customers away from Place d'Orléans. A smaller commercial area is currently underway on Trim Road south of Innes.

Plans by the city of Ottawa may bring an O-Train east-west light-rail line in the area but it was still several years away. However, the cancellation of the north–south extension project on 14 December 2006 may halt those plans.

The neighbourhood is part of the Portobello South Community Development Association, which also includes Notting Gate and Notting Hill.

== See also ==
- List of Ottawa neighbourhoods
