= Cultural events at the 2009 Jeux de la Francophonie =

Cultural events were held at the 2009 Jeux de la Francophonie between 27 September and 4 October. There were seven cultural competitions: song, storytelling, traditional inspiration dance, poetry, painting, photography and sculpture.

== Calendar ==
September/October	26	27	28	29	30	1	2	3	4	5	6	Finals
Song									1			1
Storytelling							1					1
Dance								1				1
Sculpture								1				1
Photography								1				1
Literature								1				1
Painting								1				1

== Medallists ==
Event	Gold	Silver	Bronze	Special mentions
Photography	(Canada) Genevieve Thauvette	(France) Marielsa Niels	(Romania) Laurențiu Nastasă	(Bulgaria) Grisha Grigorov
Painting	(North Macedonia) Aleksandra Petrusevska	(Lebanon) Oussama Baalbaki	(Romania) Liliana Rusu	—
Sculpture	(Quebec) Julie Picard	(Canada) Sarah Beck	(Cameroon) Jean-Fostin Amougou	(Romania) Liviu Epuraș
Literature	(Democratic Republic of the Congo) Fiston Mwanza Mujila	(Lebanon) Caroline Haten	(Burundi) Roland Lewis Rogero	(Canada) Stéphanie Filion (France) Jean-Baptiste Navlet (Quebec) Valérie Fourgues
Storytelling	(Quebec) Mathieu Lippé	(Burkina Faso) Gérard Kietega	(France) Julien Tauber	—
Dance	(Mauritius) SR Dance Company	(Rwanda) Companhia Amizero	(France) Aurélien Kairo	—
Song	(Switzerland) Nicolas Fraissinet	(Cameroon) Fotso Kareyce	(Canada) Karkwa	—

== Medal table ==
* Host nation (Lebanon)

Rank	Nation	Gold	Silver	Bronze	Total
1	Canada (CAN)	1	1	1	3
2	DR Congo (COD)	1	0	0	1
2	Mauritius (MRI)	1	0	0	1
2	North Macedonia (MKD)	1	0	0	1
2	Switzerland (SUI)	1	0	0	1
6	Lebanon (LIB)*	0	2	0	2
7	France (FRA)	0	1	2	3
8	Cameroon (CMR)	0	1	1	2
9	Burkina Faso (BUR)	0	1	0	1
9	Rwanda (RWA)	0	1	0	1
11	Romania (ROU)	0	0	2	2
12	Burundi (BDI)	0	0	1	1
Totals (12 entries)		5	7	7	19
