= Montreal station =

Montreal station may refer to:

- Montreal Central Station, the main railway station
- Montreal Coach Terminal, a bus terminal
- Montréal-Ouest station, a commuter rail station
- Montréal station (Ottawa), an under construction light rail station in Ottawa, Ontario.
- A Montreal Metro station
- Bonaventure Station (1887–1952), a former railway station
- Dalhousie Station (Canadian Pacific Railway), a former railway station
- Terminus Centre-Ville, a bus terminal
- Windsor Station (Montreal), a former railway station
