= Convent Glen station =

Future railway station in Ottawa, Ontario, Canada

Convent Glen

General information
- Coordinates: 45°28′25″N 75°32′03″W
- Owner: OC Transpo
- Platforms: Island platform
- Tracks: 2

Construction
- Structure type: Surface
- Accessible: Yes

History
- Opening: 2026

Future services
Preceding station	OC Transpo	Following station
Jeanne d'Arc toward Tunney's Pasture	Line 1 Opens 2026	Place d'Orléans toward Trim
Jeanne d'Arc toward Moodie	Line 3 Opens 2027	Place d'Orléans toward Trim
Location

Convent Glen station is an under construction rail station on Line 1 in Ottawa, Ontario. It will be located in the median of Highway 174 below Orléans Boulevard. It is being constructed as part of the Stage 2 O-Train expansion and is scheduled for completion in 2026. The station will consist of an island platform and will have two entrances; one on each side of Orléans Boulevard. Bus connections will be available at each entrance.

== Service ==
The following routes are currently planned to serve Convent Glen station:

Type	Routes
West O-Train	Under construction (opening in 2026)
East O-Train	Under construction (opening in 2026)
A Southbound	R1 (future) 31 34
B Northbound/Transitway West	R1 (future) 31 34
