= Cumberland, Ottawa =

Coordinates: 45°31′00″N 75°24′30″W

Location of Cumberland in Ottawa

Cumberland is an unincorporated village on the Ottawa River in Cumberland Ward, in the city of Ottawa. It was part of the historic Township of Cumberland. In 1999, the township became the short lived City of Cumberland which amalgamated into the City of Ottawa in 2001. While the community of Cumberland was located in the City of Cumberland, it only made up a small percentage of the population of the city.

Cumberland is bounded by Regional Road 174 and the Ottawa River to the north, Colonial Road to the southeast, Innes Road to the southwest, and Trim Road to the west.

There are 6.1 total recreational sites per 1,000 people in Cumberland.

== History ==
Cumberland was founded in 1802 when United Empire Loyalists, Abijah and Elizabeth Dunning, their son and daughter-in-law, Zalmon and Debora, and their children settled along the river at Cumberland. Granddaughter Matilda married Amable Foubert, son of Gabriel Foubert who operated and independent fur trading post where the Lièvre River flows into the Ottawa River. The early settlement was known first as Foubertville, then as Osborne. In 1864, Postmaster George Gibb Dunning, a grandson of Abijah, changed the name to Cumberland. Due to the commerce from two wharves, several gristmills, sawmills, woolen mills, match factories and seven stores, the village of Cumberland flourished until the late 1890s. In 1907, the Canadian Northern Railway established an Ottawa−Hawkesbury line that stopped at Cumberland's train station until 1936.

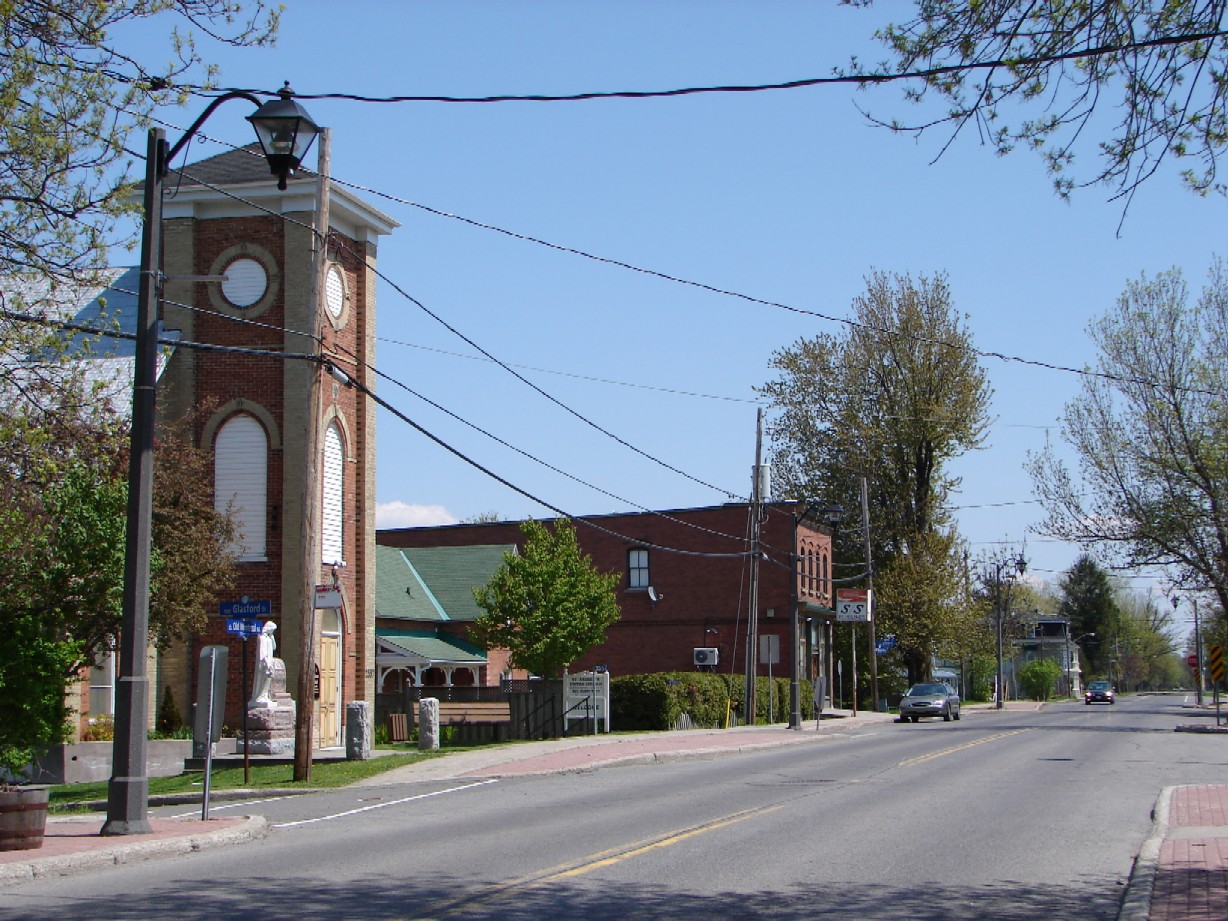
Cumberland village
