= Răzvan Cojanu =

Romanian boxer

Personal information
- Nationality: Romanian
- Born: Răzvan Andrei Cojanu; 10 March 1987 (age 39) Pucheni, Dâmbovița, Romania
- Height: 2.02 m (6 ft 8 in)
- Weight: Heavyweight

Boxing career
- Stance: Orthodox

Boxing record
- Total fights: 24
- Wins: 17
- Win by KO: 9
- Losses: 7
Medal record
Men's amateur boxing
Representing Romania
Romania National Amateur Boxing Championships
Gold medal – first place	2008 Iași	Super heavyweight
Gold medal – first place	2009 Arad	Super heavyweight
Jeux de la Francophonie
Gold medal – first place	2009 Beirut	Super heavyweight
European Union Championships
Bronze medal – third place	2009 Odense	Super heavyweight

Răzvan Andrei Cojanu (born 10 March 1987) is a Romanian professional boxer. As an amateur he represented Romania at the 2009 Jeux de la Francophonie, winning a gold medal in the super-heavyweight division; he also represented Romania at the European Union Championships, winning bronze. His knockout-to-win ratio stands at 56.3%. Cojanu was the first Romanian that fought to win a world heavyweight title.

== Professional career ==
=== Cojanu vs Parker ===
Speculation grew that Cojanu would be the replacement opponent for Joseph Parker's first world title defence after the controversial withdrawal of Hughie Fury. Cojanu was involved in Parker's training camp in Las Vegas for the aborted fight with Fury. WBC champion Deontay Wilder also called out Parker for a unification bout while Fury's cousin Tyson, the troubled former champion, said he'd be willing to jump in the ring. Parker was determined to make a statement but couldn't manage that as he left his New Zealand campaign in a convincing unanimous decision. Parker out-pointed Cojanu in the first defence of his world heavyweight title. The judges scored it 119–108, 117–110, and 117–110 in a fight where Cojanu taunted him repeatedly. American referee Mike Ortega deducted a point against Cojanu in the fourth round due to repeatedly pushing down the neck of Parker during the clinches. Parker later admitted he had problems connecting against Cojanu. But Parker's ability to keep disciplined in a fight that involved trash talk, flying elbows, clinches and head holds got him the win comfortably. After the fight, Parker said, "You can all see why we bring Răzvan into camp, we look for the best." This was said as praise, as Cojanu previously worked with Parker as a sparring partner.

== Professional boxing record ==
24 fights	17 wins	7 losses
By knockout	9	4
By decision	8	3

No.	Result	Record	Opponent	Type	Round, time	Date	Location	Notes
24	Loss	17–7	Efe Ajagba	TKO	9 (10), 2:46	7 Mar 2020	Barclays Center, New York City, New York, US	
23	Win	17–6	Tamaz Zadishvili	UD	6	20 Oct 2019	Fairmont Hotel, Monte Carlo, Monaco	
22	Loss	16–6	Daniel Dubois	KO	2 (12), 2:48	8 Mar 2019	Royal Albert Hall, London, England	For vacant WBO European heavyweight title
21	Loss	16–5	Nathan Gorman	UD	12	22 Dec 2018	Arena, Manchester, England	For WBC International Silver heavyweight title
20	Loss	16–4	Luis Ortiz	KO	2 (10), 2:08	28 Jul 2018	Staples Center, Los Angeles, California, U.S.	
19	Loss	16–3	Joseph Parker	UD	12	6 May 2017	Vodafone Events Centre, Auckland, New Zealand	For WBO heavyweight title
18	Win	16–2	Zhi Yu Wu	KO	2 (10), 2:33	10 Dec 2016	Sports Park Stadium, Hangzhou, China	Won vacant WBO China Zone heavyweight title
17	Win	15–2	Cristian Martinez	TKO	1 (6), 1:16	1 Oct 2016	Centro Deportivo Ferrocarrilero, Aguascalientes, Mexico	
16	Win	14–2	Grover Young	SD	6	30 Jan 2016	Fitzgeralds Casino and Hotel, Las Vegas, Nevada, U.S.	
15	Loss	13–2	Donovan Dennis	KO	2 (8), 0:59	10 Apr 2015	Sands Casino Resort, Bethlehem, Pennsylvania, U.S.	
14	Win	13–1	Ed Fountain	UD	7 (6)	20 Feb 2015	Turning Stone Resort & Casino, Verona, New York, U.S.	The fight was a draw after six rounds, requiring a tiebreaking seventh round
13	Win	12–1	Darius Shorter	TKO	1 (6)	20 Nov 2014	Hyder-Burks Agricultural Pavilion, Cookeville, Tennessee, U.S.	
12	Win	11–1	Manuel Alberto Pucheta	TKO	7 (12)	25 Jul 2014	Central South University of Forestry and Technology, Hunan, China	Won vacant WBO Asia Pacific heavyweight title
11	Win	10–1	Rodricka Ray	TKO	5 (6), 2:51	10 May 2014	Galen Center, Los Angeles, California, U.S.	
10	Win	9–1	Avery Gibson	UD	4	21 Mar 2014	Morongo Casino, Resort & Spa, Cabazon, California, U.S.	
9	Win	8–1	Tobias Rice	RTD	3 (6), 3:00	7 Feb 2014	Jonathan Club, Los Angeles, California, U.S.	
8	Win	7–1	Alvaro Morales	MD	4	26 Jul 2013	Thunder Valley Casino Resort, Lincoln, California, U.S.	
7	Win	6–1	Paula Mataele	TKO	3 (6), 2:40	28 Apr 2013	Convention and Exhibition Centre, Melbourne, Victoria, Australia	
6	Win	5–1	Yohan Banks	RTD	5 (6), 3:00	8 Sep 2012	Pechanga Resort and Casino, Temecula, California, U.S.	
5	Win	4–1	David Johnson	SD	4	22 May 2012	Santa Monica Pier, Santa Monica, California, U.S.	
4	Win	3–1	Bekim Pergega	TKO	2 (4)	9 Feb 2012	Sala Rapid, Bucharest, Romania	
3	Win	2–1	Rodney Hernandez	MD	4	20 Jan 2012	Palms Casino Resort, Paradise, Nevada, U.S.	
2	Win	1–1	Kourtney Boden	UD	4	29 Jul 2011	Cosmopolitan, Paradise, Nevada, U.S.	
1	Loss	0–1	Alvaro Morales	MD	4	11 Mar 2011	Planet Hollywood, Paradise, Nevada, U.S.	
