= Fallingbrook =

Fallingbrook may refer to:

- Fallingbrook, Ottawa, a neighbourhood in the community of Orléans, Canada
- Fallingbrook Middle School in Mississauga, Ontario, Canada
