= John Innes =

John Innes may refer to:

- John Innes (MP) (1767–1838), Scottish merchant and politician
- John Innes (philanthropist) (1829–1904), English philanthropist
  - John Innes Centre, founded by funds bequeathed by Innes
  - John Innes compost, developed by the Centre
- John Innes (Toronto, Ontario politician) (died 1951), Toronto municipal politician
- John Innes (Gloucester, Ontario politician) (1877–1939)
- John Brodie Innes (1815–1894), British cleric, John Innes before 1862
- John de Innes (c. 1370–1414), bishop of Moray
