= Fallingbrook, Ottawa =

Coordinates: 45°28.5′N 75°29′W

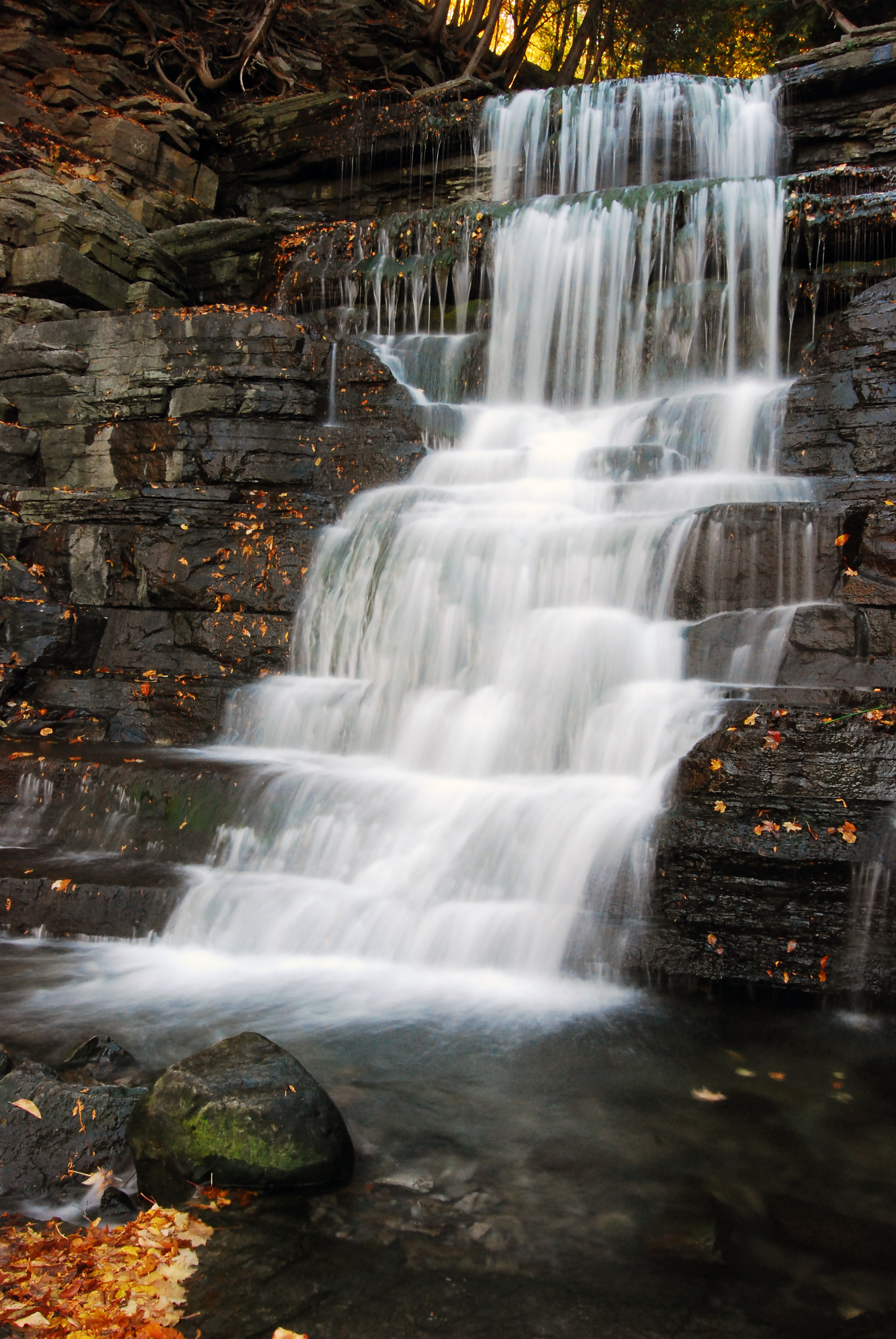
Princess Louise Falls

Fallingbrook is a neighbourhood in the community of Orleans, a suburb in the city of Ottawa, Ontario, Canada. It is located on the east edge of Orleans and is bounded by Tenth Line Road in the west, St. Joseph Boulevard and Old Montréal Road to the north, Trim Road and Cardinal Creek to the east, and Innes Road to the south. Below the community of Fallingbrook flows the Ottawa River, and Petrie Island is the closest beach.

The community was formerly part of the Township of Cumberland and has rapidly developed over the past two decades, with new developments underway. Development commenced in 1985 from what had been farmlands. In 2012, its population is over 25,000. Mainly families choose to live in Orléans because of the many elementary schools and high schools. In total, there are two secondary high schools and eight elementary schools in the area, including a recreational complex with a daycare. Attached to the Ray Friel Centre, is the community's only public library.

The Fallingbrook Community Association plays a big part in bringing the town together. To help to unite the community, they hold various local events to encourage people to get active within their community. Among the programs and events are Canada Day, Summerfest, Neighbourhood Watch program, and a community garage sale in the early springtime.

One of Fallingbrook's natural beauties is Princess Louise Falls, which can be found on an escarpment overlooking St. Joseph Boulevard. The falls are accessible by walking trails. A concrete channel at the bottom of the falls are a remnant of the earlier Montreal Road that passed closer to the falls prior to being moved.
