= Judo at the 2009 Jeux de la Francophonie =

Judo competition

Judo Judo at the 2009 Jeux de la Francophonie
- Venue: Michel el Murr Stadium
- Location: Beirut, Lebanon
- Dates: 28–30 September 2009

Competition at external databases
- Links: JudoInside

At the 2009 Jeux de la Francophonie, the judo events were held at the Michel el Murr Stadium in Beirut, Lebanon from 28 to 30 September. A total of 14 events were contested according to gender and weight division.

== Medal winners ==
=== Men ===
Event	Gold	Silver	Bronze
Extra-lightweight (60 kg)	Sofiane Milous (FRA)	Alae Idrissi (MAR)	Fradj Dhoubi (TUN)
Extra-lightweight (60 kg)	Sofiane Milous (FRA)	Alae Idrissi (MAR)	Frazer Will (CAN)
Half-lightweight (66 kg)	Sasha Mehmedovic (CAN)	Hambardzum Tonoyan (ARM)	Amin El Hady (EGY)
Half-lightweight (66 kg)	Sasha Mehmedovic (CAN)	Hambardzum Tonoyan (ARM)	Fabrice Flammand (BEL)
Lightweight (73 kg)	Ugo Legrand (FRA)	Nicolas Tritton (CAN)	Ngambomo Lokuku (COD)
Lightweight (73 kg)	Ugo Legrand (FRA)	Nicolas Tritton (CAN)	Jean-Philippe Gagnon (CAN)
Half-middleweight (81 kg)	Safouane Attaf (MAR)	Nacif Elias (LIB)	Mohamed Darwish (EGY)
Half-middleweight (81 kg)	Safouane Attaf (MAR)	Nacif Elias (LIB)	Florian Malitourne (FRA)
Middleweight (90 kg)	Mohamed El Assri (MAR)	Dieudonné Dolassem (CMR)	Christophe van Dijck (BEL)
Middleweight (90 kg)	Mohamed El Assri (MAR)	Dieudonné Dolassem (CMR)	Bogdan Bărbulescu (ROU)

=== Women ===
Event	Gold	Silver	Bronze
Lightweight (57 kg)	Sarah Loko (FRA)	Fatima-Zohra Chakir (MAR)	Andreea Chițu (ROU)
Lightweight (57 kg)	Sarah Loko (FRA)	Fatima-Zohra Chakir (MAR)	Jolianne Melancon (CAN)
Half-middleweight (63 kg)	Rizlein Zouak (FRA)	Aida Ali Oualla (MAR)	Fary Seye (SEN)
Half-middleweight (63 kg)	Rizlein Zouak (FRA)	Aida Ali Oualla (MAR)	Laurence Cote (CAN)
Middleweight (70 kg)	Magalie Legay (FRA)	Houda Miled (TUN)	Felicite Marie Mbala Ntsama (CMR)
Middleweight (70 kg)	Magalie Legay (FRA)	Houda Miled (TUN)	Misenga Bwanga (MRI)
Half-heavyweight (78 kg)	Catherine Roberge (Quebec)	Amy Cotton (CAN)	Hana Mergheni (TUN)
Half-heavyweight (78 kg)	Catherine Roberge (Quebec)	Amy Cotton (CAN)	Christelle Clémentin Okobombe Foguing (CMR)
Heavyweight (+78 kg)	Nirel Chikhrouhou (TUN)	Aminata Diatta (SEN)	Emelie Andeol (FRA)
