= Trim station =

Trim
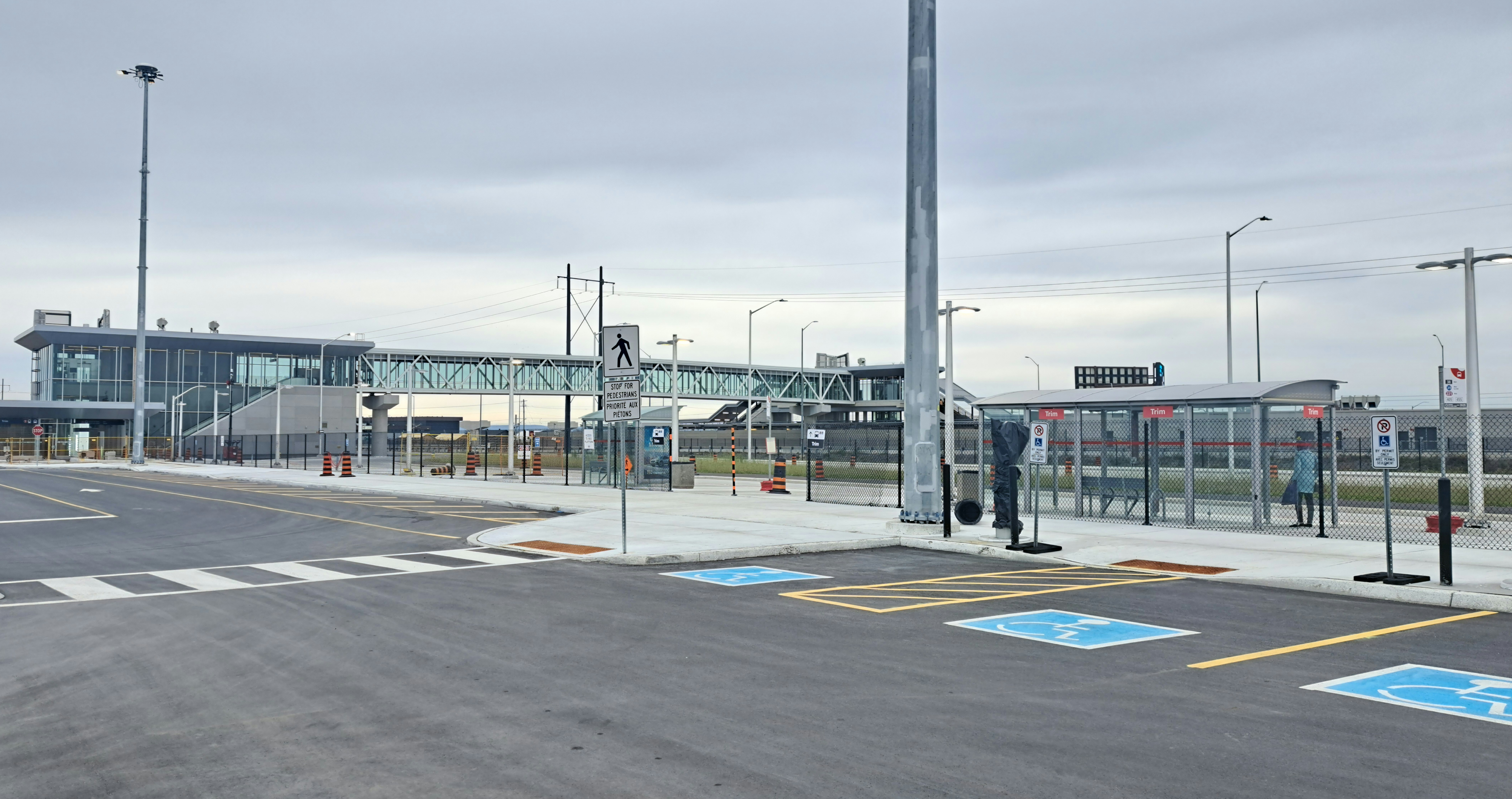
- The Trim bus station in Ottawa, Canada.

General information
- Location: Ottawa, Ontario; Canada
- Coordinates: 45°29′36″N 75°28′48″W
- Owner: OC Transpo

Construction
- Parking: 1,089 spaces
- Accessible: Yes

History
- Opened: 2001 (Transitway)
- Opening: 2026 (O-Train)

Services
Preceding station	OC Transpo	Following station
Place d'Orléans toward Blair	Route 39	Millennium Terminus

Future services
Preceding station	OC Transpo	Following station
Place d'Orléans toward Tunney's Pasture	Line 1 Opens 2026	Terminus
Place d'Orléans toward Moodie	Line 3 Opens 2027	Terminus
Location

Trim station is a Transitway station and future O-Train terminus in the east end of Ottawa, Ontario, located near Trim Road and Regional Road 174 (former Highway 17). A Natrel factory is located near this station.

Trim station once served as the eastern weekday terminus for the OC Transpo Transitway route 95, but is now served every day of the week, with Rapid Route 39 travelling between Blair and Millennium stations. Before October 2019, there was no rapid weekend service at the station, as it was mostly used a stop for servicing commuters who were using the Park and Ride facility that contains about 1,089 parking spaces.

There are plans to possibly add a transitway extension into residential neighbourhoods along Innes Road and Trim Road, while it remains mostly rural to the east towards Cumberland Village and Rockland.

During the summer, special service to nearby Petrie Island Beach is provided on weekends.

This station will serve as the eastern terminus for O-Train Line 1 beginning in 2026.

== Service ==
The following routes serve Trim station:

Trim station service
West O-Train	Under construction (opening in 2026)
1A (A) Local (South, East)	39 221
2A (B) Transitway (West)	R1 (future) 38 39 139 221 405 455 639

=== Notes ===
- Route 39 towards or from Blair station does not travel past this station during the late evenings on weekdays.
- Route 139 only operates on weekends during the summer months.
