= Basketball at the 2009 Jeux de la Francophonie =

Basketball competition

The basketball competition at the 2009 Jeux de la Francophonie was held between 28 September and 5 October. The events took place at the courts of Sporting Al Riyadi Beirut, in Lebanon. Romania won the competition overall, beating runners up Senegal in the final. Both a men's and a women's tournament was announced in the programme but a schedule conflict with the EuroBasket 2009 tournament meant that only the women's competition was held.

Cyprus, originally the leaders of Group A, were disqualified from the competition. It was discovered that some of the country's team members were not fully naturalised citizens, including one American, one Polish, one Serbian and two Croat players. The organizers proposed, in keeping with the spirit of the Games, to maintain the scheduled match against France but its result was not taken into account.

== Women's competition ==
=== Group stage ===
Group A
Team	Won	Lost	Points for	Points against	Difference	Total points
France	4	1	244	216	28	9
Tunisia	3	2	262	291	−29	8
Mali	2	3	264	288	−24	7
Quebec	1	4	286	342	−56	6
Ivory Coast	1	4	293	321	−28	6
Cyprus (DSQ)	4	1	309	200	109	–

Group B
Team	Won	Lost	Points for	Points against	Difference	Total points
Romania	4	0	325	239	86	8
Senegal	3	1	306	242	64	7
Lebanon	2	2	262	299	−37	6
(Wallonia) FC Belgium	1	3	282	316	−34	5
Cameroon	0	4	224	303	−79	4

=== Finals ===
Semifinals
Romania	55
Tunisia	49
Senegal	74
France	59

Final
Romania	70
Senegal	53
Third place
Tunisia	61
France	52

5th place playoff
1	Mali	57
2	Lebanon	65

7th place playoff
1	Quebec	75
2	(Wallonia) French Community of Belgium	73

9th place playoff
1	Ivory Coast	95
2	Cameroon	63
