= Montréal station (Ottawa) =

Future railway station in Ottawa, Ontario, Canada

Montréal

General information
- Coordinates: 45°27′05″N 75°35′01″W
- Owner: OC Transpo
- Platforms: Island platform
- Tracks: 2

Construction
- Structure type: Elevated
- Accessible: Yes

History
- Opening: 2026

Future services
Preceding station	OC Transpo	Following station
Blair toward Tunney's Pasture	Line 1 Opens 2026	Jeanne d'Arc toward Trim
Blair toward Moodie	Line 3 Opens 2027	Jeanne d'Arc toward Trim
Location

Montréal station is an under construction rail station on Line 1 in Ottawa, Ontario. It will be located in the median of Highway 174 at Montreal Road. It is being constructed as part of the Stage 2 O-Train expansion and is scheduled for completion in 2026. The station will consist of an island platform and will have two entrances; one on each side of Montréal Road. Bus connections will be available at each entrance.

== Service ==
The following routes serve Montréal station:

Type	Routes
West O-Train	Under construction (opening in 2026)
East O-Train	Under construction (opening in 2026)
Montréal A East	Unused
Montréal B West	Unused
R.R.174 / Montréal C (#1920) Transitway (West)	R1 (future) 30 32 33 34 35 38 39 405 455
R.R.174 / Montréal D (#2461) Transitway (East)	R1 (future) 30 32 33 34 35 38 39
St Joseph / R.R. 174 (#5682) West	24 226 619 621 627 628
St Joseph / R.R. 174 (#2369) East	24 226 619 621 627 628
Montréal / R.R. 174 (#8757) West	21 24 619
Montréal / R.R. 174 (#8728) East	24 619
