= Beach volleyball at the 2009 Jeux de la Francophonie =

The men's and women's beach volleyball contests at the 2009 Jeux de la Francophonie were held between 28 September and 4 October. The venue for the competition was Byblos beach in northern Beirut. Canada and France were the men's and women's tournament winners respectively. The host, Lebanon, entered two separate teams into both the men's and women's tournament. The competition was a demonstration sport at the 2009 edition of the Games, thus the medals awarded did not count towards the countries' overall totals.

== Men's competition ==
=== Group stage ===
Group A
| Team | Played | Won | Lost | Points |
|---|---|---|---|---|
| Switzerland | 3 | 3 | 0 | 6 |
| Lebanon (1) | 3 | 2 | 1 | 5 |
| New Brunswick | 3 | 1 | 2 | 4 |
| Republic of the Congo | 3 | 0 | 3 | 3 |

Group B
| Team | Played | Won | Lost | Points |
|---|---|---|---|---|
| France | 3 | 3 | 0 | 6 |
| Canada | 3 | 2 | 1 | 5 |
| Burundi | 3 | 1 | 2 | 4 |
| Niger | 3 | 0 | 3 | 3 |

Group C
| Team | Played | Won | Lost | Points |
|---|---|---|---|---|
| Quebec | 4 | 4 | 0 | 8 |
| Lebanon (2) | 4 | 3 | 1 | 7 |
| Cyprus | 4 | 2 | 2 | 6 |
| Seychelles | 4 | 1 | 3 | 5 |
| Ivory Coast | 4 | 0 | 4 | 4 |

=== Finals ===
Quarter-finals
B1 | France | 2
C3 | Cyprus | 0
B2 | Canada | 2
C2 | Lebanon (2) | 0
C1 | Quebec | 2
A3 | New Brunswick | 0
A1 | Switzerland | 2
A2 | Lebanon (1) | 0

Semi-finals
France | 0
Canada | 2
Quebec | 0
Switzerland | 2

Final
Canada | 2
Switzerland | 1

| 3rd place playoff |
| 1 | Quebec | 0 |
| 2 | France | 2 |

== Women's competition ==
=== Group stage ===
Group A
| Team | Played | Won | Lost | Points |
|---|---|---|---|---|
| Quebec | 5 | 5 | 0 | 10 |
| Switzerland | 5 | 4 | 1 | 9 |
| New Brunswick | 5 | 3 | 2 | 8 |
| Seychelles | 5 | 2 | 3 | 7 |
| Lebanon (1) | 1 | 4 | 3 | 6 |
| Ivory Coast | 5 | 0 | 5 | 5 |

Group B
| Team | Played | Won | Lost | Points |
|---|---|---|---|---|
| Canada | 5 | 5 | 0 | 10 |
| France | 5 | 4 | 1 | 9 |
| Republic of the Congo | 5 | 3 | 2 | 8 |
| Lebanon (2) | 5 | 2 | 3 | 7 |
| Niger | 5 | 1 | 4 | 6 |
| Burundi | 5 | 0 | 5 | 5 |

=== Finals ===
Quarter-finals
B1 | Canada
BYE
A2 | Switzerland | 2
B3 | Republic of the Congo | 0
A1 | Quebec
BYE
A3 | New Brunswick | 0
B2 | France | 2

Semi-finals
Canada | 0
Switzerland | 2
Quebec | 0
France | 2

Final
Switzerland | 1
France | 2

| 5th place playoff |
| 1 | Republic of the Congo | 0 |
| 2 | New Brunswick | 2 |

| 3rd place playoff |
| 1 | Canada | 2 |
| 2 | Quebec | 1 |

== Medal table ==
| Rank | Nation | Gold | Silver | Bronze | Total |
|---|---|---|---|---|---|
| 1 | Canada (CAN) | 1 | 0 | 1 | 2 |
| 1 | France (FRA) | 1 | 0 | 1 | 2 |
| 3 | Switzerland (SUI) | 0 | 2 | 0 | 2 |
| Totals (3 entries) | | 2 | 2 | 2 | 6 |
