= Sévère D'Aoust =

Canadian settler

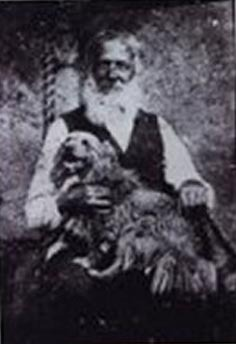
Caption

Sévère D'Aoust (or Daoust) born in Vaudreuil, Lower Canada in the early 19th century, established a village in the region of Bearbrook in 1854. He later gave part of his land for the construction of a Roman Catholic church in Sarsfield, Ontario in 1886.

Sévère D'Aoust and his wife Odille Adèle St-Denis were Québec farmers before the Roman Catholic bishops from Montréal encouraged farmers to colonize the Eastern area of Ontario. The couple settled in Cumberland Township.
