= Table tennis at the 2009 Jeux de la Francophonie =

At the 2009 Jeux de la Francophonie, the table tennis events were hosted at the club facilities of Homenetmen Beirut from 28 September to 4 October. A total of 54 competitors, 28 men and 26 women, took part in four different tournaments: a men's individual competition, a women's individual competition, a mixed doubles competition, and a team tournament.

== Medallists ==
Tournament	Gold	Silver	Bronze
Men's singles	Kien Quoc Doan (VIE)	Ahmed Ali Saleh (EGY)	Nicolas Mohler (SUI); Suraju Saka (CGO)
Women's singles	Zhang Mo (CAN)	Hoang My Trang Mai (VIE)	Audrey Mattenet (FRA); Cristina Hîrîci (ROU)
Mixed doubles	Romania	Canada	France; French Community of Belgium
Team	Canada	Vietnam	Switzerland; France

== Medal table ==
Rank	Nation	Gold	Silver	Bronze	Total
1	Canada (CAN)	2	1	0	3
2	Vietnam (VIE)	1	2	0	3
3	Romania (ROU)	1	0	1	2
4	Egypt (EGY)	0	1	0	1
5	France (FRA)	0	0	3	3
6	Switzerland (SUI)	0	0	2	2
7	Congo (CGO)	0	0	1	1
7	French Community of Belgium	0	0	1	1
Totals (8 entries)		4	4	8	16

== Participation ==
Key: Country (no. of athletes)

- Armenia (2)
- Benin (2)
- Bulgaria (2)
- Burkina Faso (2)
- Cameroon (2)
- Canada (2)
  - Quebec (2)
- Ivory Coast (2)
- Cyprus (2)
- Democratic Republic of the Congo (2)
- Djibouti (2)
- Egypt (2)
- Equatorial Guinea (1)
- France (2)
- Lebanon (2) (host)
- Luxembourg (2)
- Mauritius (2)
- Morocco (2)
- Niger (2)
- Republic of the Congo (1)
- Romania (2)
- Rwanda (2)
- Seychelles (2)
- Switzerland (2)
- Togo (2)
- Tunisia (2)
- Vietnam (2)
- French Community of Belgium (2)
