= Genevieve Thauvette =

Genevieve Thauvette is a Toronto-based Ottawa-born multi-disciplinary artist. Her notable works include "Breaking News" (2017), "Cake is Freedom" (2012), "The Dionne Quintuplets" (2009), and "Beheld: Iconic Self-Portraits." (2008)

Thauvette is the recipient of the gold medal at the 2009 Jeux de la Francophonie, Lebanon, in the photography category.

Her photographs have shown internationally, notably at the 17th Japan Media Arts Festival, the Perth International Arts Festival (Australia), the 2010 Vancouver Winter Olympic Games, and the Vie Jeux de la Francophonie in Beirut. Work from her series Les quintuplées Dionne have been acquired by the Canadian Museum of History, the City of Ottawa Fine Art Collection and the Ottawa Art Gallery. She is a 2013 recipient of the FlashForward emerging artists award and has earned several grants, including a 2011, 2016, and 2017 Artist Production Grant from the Ontario Arts Council and the 2015 and 2017 Artists in the Library grant from the Toronto Arts Council.

Thauvette presented Cake is Freedom, a performative installation at Ottawa's inaugural Nuit Blanche, which was the subject of a Radio-Canada documentary (Rendez-vous Artv). Geneviève has presented many photo workshops and been a part of numerous juries. In 2012 and 2016 respectively, she was chosen to select the final participating artists for the North-American and Caribbean delegations for the VIIe and VIIIe Jeux de la Francophonie. She was also a photography competition jury member during the 2013 Games held in Nice and president of the jury at the 2017 Games in Abidjan.

She is currently represented by Eye Buy Art and the St-Laurent+Hill gallery in Ottawa, Ontario.

== Personal ==
Raised in Navan, Ontario, Canada, Thauvette was born in Ottawa in September 1985 and currently resides in Toronto.
