= Boxing at the 2009 Jeux de la Francophonie =

Boxing competitions

The men's boxing competition at the 2009 Jeux de la Francophonie took place between 29 September and 5 October. There were a total of 106 entrants competing in eleven different weight classes, following the classes that are contested in the Olympic boxing programme.

== Medallists ==
Weight	Gold	Silver	Bronze
48 kg	Jérémy Beccu (FRA)	Haithem Azizi (TUN)	Jonathan Quinit (CAN); Igor Cbodo (CAF)
51 kg	Nordine Ait Ihya (FRA)	Hajri Mahdi (TUN)	Francois Pratte (CAN) (Quebec) Benoit Fleury (QBC)
54 kg	Răzvan Andreiana (ROU)	Bruno Julie (MRI)	Hicham Mesbahi (MAR); Mahmoud Mohy Abdel (EGY)
57 kg	Oualid Belaoura (FRA)	Wael Chahine (LIB)	Elian Dimitrov (BUL); Viet Tran Quoc (VIE)
60 kg	Souleyman Cissokho (FRA)	Badredine Hadioui (MAR)	Alex Rynn (CAN) (Quebec) Michael Gadbois (QBC)
64 kg	Louis Richarno Colin (MRI)	Hamza Hassini (TUN)	Mohamed Mechhabi (MAR); Jonathan Bochner (CAN)
69 kg	Joseph Mulema (CMR)	Adil Bella (MAR)	Nivesh Gyadin (MRI); Hosam Hussein (EGY)
75 kg	Michael Raymond (FRA)	Mbacke Sarr (SEN)	Ahmed Barki (MAR); Nabil Sayed Zaki (EGY)
81 kg	Constantin Bejenaru (ROU)	Amin El Mohammady (EGY)	Ludovic Groguhe (FRA); Christian Donfack Adjoufack (CMR)
91 kg	Arsen Goulamirian (FRA)	Mohamed Arjaoui (MAR)	Justin Bonhomme (CAN)
91+ kg	Răzvan Cojanu (ROU)	Didier Bence (CAN)	Koniba Sissoko (MLI)

== Medal table ==
Rank	Nation	Gold	Silver	Bronze	Total
1	France (FRA)	6	0	1	7
2	Romania (ROU)	3	0	0	3
3	Mauritius (MRI)	1	1	1	3
4	Cameroon (CMR)	1	0	1	2
5	Morocco (MAR)	0	3	3	6
6	Tunisia (TUN)	0	3	0	3
7	Canada (CAN)	0	1	5	6
8	Egypt (EGY)	0	1	3	4
9	Lebanon (LIB)	0	1	0	1
9	Senegal (SEN)	0	1	0	1
11	Bulgaria (BUL)	0	0	1	1
11	Central African Republic (CAF)	0	0	1	1
11	Mali (MLI)	0	0	1	1
11	Vietnam (VIE)	0	0	1	1
Totals (14 entries)		11	11	18	40

== Participation ==
Key: Country (no. of athletes)

- Armenia (4)
- Benin (3)
- Bulgaria (2)
- Burkina Faso (4)
- Cambodia (3)
- Cameroon (5)
- Canada (11)
  - New Brunswick (2)
  - Quebec (5)
- Central African Republic (2)
- Democratic Republic of the Congo (2)
- Egypt (6)
- Equatorial Guinea (1)
- France (8)
- Haiti (2)
- Lebanon (7) (host)
- Mali (3)
- Mauritius (6)
- Morocco (9)
- Niger (3)
- Romania (4)
- Senegal (3)
- Seychelles (2)
- Tunisia (6)
- Vietnam (3)
