= Football at the 2009 Jeux de la Francophonie =

Tournament details
- Host country: Lebanon
- City: Beirut
- Dates: 26 September - 6 October
- Teams: 9 (from 3 confederations)
- Venue: 2 (in 1 host city)

Final positions
- Champions: Congo
- Runners-up: Ivory Coast
- Third place: Morocco
- Fourth place: Canada

Tournament statistics
- Matches played: 13
- Goals scored: 36 (2.77 per match)
- Top scorer(s): (Canada) Alex Semenets (Morocco) Ridallah El Ghazoufi (3 goals)
- All statistics correct as of 3 October 2009.

Each nation brought their under-20 teams to compete in a group and knockout tournament. The top teams and the best second placed team advanced to the knockout stage of the competition. Congo won the tournament after a penalty shootout against the Ivorians.

== Group stage ==
=== Group A ===
Team	Pld	W	D	L	GF	GA	GD	Pts
Ivory Coast	2	1	1	0	5	2	+3	4
Congo	2	1	1	0	4	3	+1	4
Lebanon	2	0	0	2	1	5	−4	0

2009-09-26

Lebanon	1 – 2	Congo
Ataya 9'		Cseke 74'; Taleb 88' (o.g.)

2009-09-28

Lebanon	0 – 3	Ivory Coast
		Deblé 38'; Ngossan 75'; Coulibaly 85'

2009-09-30

Congo	2 – 2	Ivory Coast
Cseke 26'; Lemina 29'		Coulibaly 38'; Kouassi 66'

=== Group B ===
Team	Pld	W	D	L	GF	GA	GD	Pts
Canada	2	1	0	1	4	3	+1	3
Cameroon	2	1	0	1	3	3	0	3
Rwanda	2	1	0	1	4	5	−1	3

2009-09-26

Canada	2 – 3	Rwanda
Semenets 75', 88'		Mvuyekure 21', 65'; Surprenant 52' (o.g.)

2009-09-28

Cameroon	3 – 1	Rwanda
Metogo 22'; Kom 58'; Belle 90+5'		Ntamuhanga 71'

2009-09-30

Canada	2 – 0	Cameroon
De Medina 50'; Semenets 65'

=== Group C ===
Team	Pld	W	D	L	GF	GA	GD	Pts
Morocco	2	2	0	0	2	0	+2	6
Senegal	2	0	1	1	1	2	−1	1
France	2	0	1	1	1	2	−1	1

2009-09-26

Morocco	1 – 0	Senegal
El Ghazoufi 90'

2009-09-28

Senegal	1 – 1	France
Wade 27'		Cissé 34'

2009-09-30

France	0 – 1	Morocco
		Kachani 33'

== Knockout stage ==
Semi-finals
3 October - Beirut
Morocco	1
Ivory Coast	2
3 October - Beirut
Congo	2 (2)
Canada	2 (1)

Final
6 October -
Ivory Coast	0 (3)
Congo	0 (5)
Third place
5 October -
Morocco	3
Canada	1

=== Semi-finals ===
2009-10-03

Morocco	1 – 2	Ivory Coast
Fettouhi 45' (pen.)		Lago 11'; Gnanbgo 90'

Camille Chamoun Sports City Stadium, Beirut

2009-10-03

Congo	2 – 2 (a.e.t)	Canada
Kaya 32'; Lemina 56'		Whiteman 3'; Agourram 89'
Penalties
Fridrich Diafouka (penalty scored); Makolo Cancred (penalty missed); Ngavouka Cseke (penalty missed); Tsiba Moukassa (penalty missed); Gitel Boukama (penalty scored)	2 – 1	Jarek Whiteman (penalty missed); Miloš Šćepanović (penalty missed); Reda Agourram (penalty missed); Gino Mauro (penalty missed); Alex Semenets (penalty scored)

Beirut Municipality Stadium, Beirut

=== 3rd Place ===
2009-10-05

Morocco	3 – 1	Canada
El Ghazoufi 6', 36'; Fettouhi 76' (pen.)		Surprenant 5'

=== Final ===
2009-10-06

Ivory Coast	0 – 0 (a.e.t)	Congo
Penalties
Fridrich Diafouka (penalty scored); Christian Okoua (penalty missed); Bakary Koné (penalty scored); Antoine Ngossan (penalty missed); Ange Gnangbo (penalty scored)	3 – 5	Kouakou Mansou (penalty scored); Ngavuka Cseke (penalty scored); Nulva Ayessa (penalty scored); Anderson Oliver (penalty scored); Steven Bitsindou (penalty scored)

== See also ==
Football at the Jeux de la Francophonie
