= Notting Gate =

Neighborhood in Ottawa, Ontario, Canada

Coordinates: 45.47230°N 75.46325°W

Notting Gate (also known as Notting Hill) is a neighbourhood located in Cumberland Ward, in the suburb of Orleans in Ottawa, Ontario, Canada. Located south of Innes Road, east of Portobello Boulevard, west of Trim Road, and north of Brian Coburn Boulevard (formerly Blackburn Bypass) . According to the Canada 2011 Census, this area had a population of 4,232.

Major streets in the neighbourhood include:

- Innes Road
- Trim Road
- Brian Coburn Boulevard
- Portobello Boulevard
- Provence Avenue
- Scala Avenue

== Schools ==
There are three elementary-level schools and one secondary school serving the needs of students in the neighbourhood.

- École élémentaire catholique de la Découverte
- École élémentaire Des Sentiers
- Avalon Public School
- École secondaire catholique Béatrice-Desloges
