= John Innes (Gloucester, Ontario politician) =

John Innes (January 30, 1877 – August 24, 1939) was an Ontario politician. He served as reeve of Gloucester Township, Ontario from 1931 to 1939.

The son of Alexander and Margaret Innes, natives of Scotland, he was born in Gloucester township. Innes operated a dairy and mixed farm in the Cyrville area on what is now Innes Road. In 1915, he married Margaret Little Moxley. Innes became deputy reeve in 1927 and reeve four years later. He also served as chairman of the finance committee for Carleton County for the last five years of his life. He died in office at the age of 62, after suffering a stroke on July 27.

A plaque was installed on Bank Street in Gloucester commemorating his life.
