= Innes Road =

Arterial road in Ottawa, Ontario, Canada

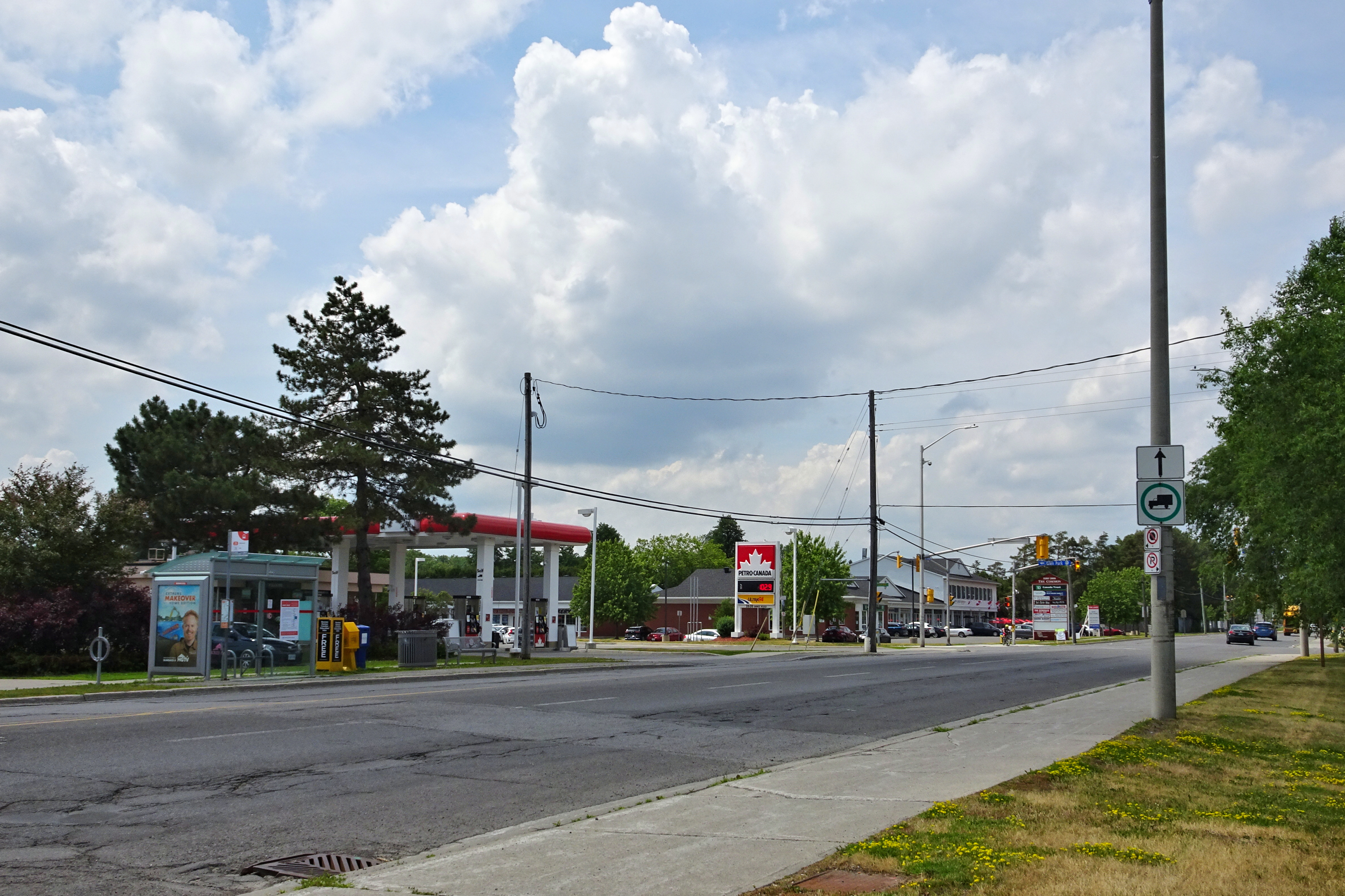
Original Innes Road in Blackburn Hamlet

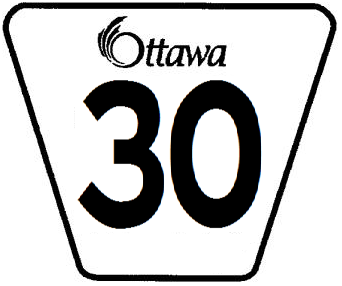

Innes Road (Ottawa Road #30) is one of the most important arterial roads in the east end of the City of Ottawa, Ontario, Canada, running through the former cities of Gloucester and Cumberland. It is the main route serving Blackburn Hamlet and south Orléans, as well as several industrial and commercial areas in east Ottawa.

== Features ==
The western section from St. Laurent Boulevard to Cyrville Road is a four-lane principal arterial road that primarily runs through industrial and light commercial areas with partial access control, although with an 80 km/h (50 mph) speed limit. Some residential frontage and considerable commercial frontage exists in the fairly congested section east of Highway 417, where Innes widens to six lanes up to Blackburn Hamlet and then becomes a divided four-lane road. The Canadian Conservation Institute is located in this section.

Innes splits in Blackburn Hamlet; The original alignment runs through the community as an undivided road with a lower speed limit of 50 km/h (31 mph). The 3.3 km (2.1 mi) long Blackburn Hamlet Bypass (Ottawa Road 128) was built in the late 1980s; it is a divided expressway around Blackburn Hamlet maintaining 80 km/h (50 mph), greatly speeding up the commute to Orléans.

Once in Orléans, Innes once again becomes a commercial/mixed frontage principal arterial road. This segment was widened from two to four lanes in the mid 2000s due to the urban sprawl of south Orléans. The most congested section is at Tenth Line Road, which has become the second commercial hub of Orléans (after Place d'Orléans). The speed limit through Orléans is 60 km/h (37 mph) although during the construction project it was reduced mostly to 50 km/h (31 mph).

Once clear of Orléans (east of Frank Kenny Road), Innes becomes a rural road.

== History ==
Innes Road, originally called the 3rd Line, was completed as a link between the communities of Blackburn and Cyrville in 1878. When the western portion of the road was widened and realigned in the 1980s, much of it ran north of, and parallel to, the original roadway. Part of the original road that still survives as Old Innes Road and Windmill Lane, and runs to Ritchie’s Feed and Seed Store and past other businesses.

=== Name origin ===
In 1960, the road was named after John Innes, who was Reeve of the Township of Gloucester from 1931 to 1939. Innes owned a dairy and mixed farm close to the present day intersection of Innes and Bantree Street. He was son to Alexander and Margaret Innes, originally of Aberdeen, Scotland.

A monument to John Innes was erected at the corner of Russell Road and Walkley Road in 1941, but was not maintained and it was removed when Gloucester was amalgamated into Ottawa. In Fall 2013, a new cairn with a commemorative plaque was placed in front of Gloucester Hall on Bank Street.

== Major intersections ==
- Ottawa Road 26 (St. Laurent Boulevard) (where it becomes Industrial Avenue)
- Highway 417
- Ottawa Road 128 (Cyrville Road)
- Ottawa Road 27 (Blair Road)
- Ottawa Road 27 (Anderson Rd)
- Ottawa Road 30 (Blackburn Hamlet Bypass)
- Ottawa Road 28 (Bearbrook Road)
- Ottawa Road 30 (Blackburn Hamlet Bypass)
- Ottawa Road 56 (Orléans Boulevard)
- Ottawa Road 55 (Jeanne d'Arc Boulevard) & Ottawa Road 41 (Mer Bleue Road)
- Ottawa Road 47 (Tenth Line Road)
- Ottawa Road 57 (Trim Road)
- Ottawa Road 33 (Frank Kenny Road)
- Ottawa Road 35 (Dunning Road)

== Communities ==
- Cyrville
- Pineview (http://www.pineviewottawa.com/)
- Blackburn Hamlet
- Chapel Hill (North and South)
- Mer Bleue
- Fallingbrook
- Avalon
- Notting Gate
- Orleans
- Gloucester
