= 2009 Jeux de la Francophonie =

Athletic games event

VIèmes Jeux de la Francophonie
- Cédrus, a phoenix, as the symbol and mascot of the 2009 Games.
- Host city: Beirut, Lebanon
- Motto: Solidarité, Diversité, Excellence (Solidarity, Diversity, Excellence)
- Nations: 40
- Athletes: 2,500
- Events: 6 sports and 7 cultural events
- Opening: 27 September 2009
- Closing: 6 October 2009
- Opened by: President Michel Sleiman
- Athlete's Oath: Karine Bouchakjian
- Judge's Oath: Ali Sabbagh
- Main venue: Camille Chamoun Sports City Stadium

The 2009 Jeux de la Francophonie (Arabic: الألعاب الفرانكوفونية 2009; 6th Francophone Games), was an international multi-sport event held from 27 September to 6 October in Beirut, Lebanon.

== Organization ==
The organization of the Jeux de la Francophonie is entrusted by the local authorities of the hosting country to a national committee – the Comité National des Jeux Francophones (CNJF). The CNJF organizes the games in conformity with the regulations and under the supervision of an international committee, the Comité international des Jeux de la Francophonie (CIJF). The CNJF’s responsibilities include accommodation, local transportation, press center, opening and closing events, medical service, safety, insurance, the promotion of its national territory, and the accreditation.

=== Costs ===
Canada, a traditional supporter of the Organisation internationale de la Francophonie, regularly provides funding for the competition and in September 2009, the Minister of Intergovernmental Affairs and La Francophonie, Josée Verner, stated that Canada was contributing $1 million towards the costs of the Games.

=== Bid ===
Lebanon was chosen to host the sixth edition of the Jeux de la Francophonie during the 29th Conference of Youth and Sports Ministers (Conférence des ministres de la jeunesse et des sports) which took place in Beirut in March 2003.

=== Logo and mascot ===
Cédrus, the official mascot

The official mascot featured a stylized image of a phoenix depicted in the colors of the International Organization of the Francophonie. This mascot was chosen by the Lebanese organizing committee (CNJF) as the symbol of the 2009 Games. The phoenix logo was designed by Lebanese caricaturist Armand Homsi and was dubbed 'Cédrus' following a contest organized by the CNJF in which Lara Akiki, a Lebanese citizen was awarded a prize for proposing the name for the mascot.

=== Venues ===
The Jeux de la Francophonie was held in a variety of venues throughout Lebanon. The Lebanese University campus at Hadath hosted all the delegations and the participants in the campus' dorms. The university's sports facilities were used for training and the theaters hosted cultural events.

The centerpiece of the 2009 Jeux de la Francophonie was the Camille Chamoun Sports City Stadium. It hosted the opening ceremony, as well as the finals of the athletics and soccer competitions. The boxing tournament was also held here, taking place in the stadium's Pierre Gemayel facility, but the other sports competitions were held elsewhere throughout the coastal cities in Lebanon. The Rafic Hariri Stadium in Sidon and the Beirut Municipal Stadium hosted soccer tournaments. The table tennis tournaments were held in the Homenetmen Beirut club facilities, while Sporting Al Riyadi Beirut's arena hosted the female basketball competition. The Michel el-Murr Stadium in Bauchrieh held the judo competitions and, further north, the Byblos beaches hosted the beach volleyball matches.

Cultural events were held in the UNESCO Palace and the Abou Khater and Béryte theaters at the Université Saint-Joseph in Beirut. The UNESCO Palace hosted the dance, painting, photography and sculpture competitions. The Abou Khater and Béryte theaters hosted the preliminary phases of literature and song competitions. The final phase of these competitions took place in the Beirut International Exhibition & Leisure Center (BIEL) and at the Casino du Liban.

=== Security ===
The Jeux de la Francophonie were held amidst the crisis of formation of the Lebanese government and ever-present fears of internal turmoil. The Interior Minister, Ziad Baroud, affirmed that the Games would put Lebanon back on the world map and stressed that the country was capable of meeting all its commitments despite its domestic crisis. Security for the event was tight with thousands of soldiers and police deployed around the various venues and at the Lebanese University main campus that hosted the "Francophone Village" at the outskirts of Beirut where participants stayed. Prime minister-designate Saad Hariri urged all the political parties to exercise restraint, describing the Games as important for the country's image.

=== Media coverage ===
The opening ceremony of the Games was transmitted live and was watched by a television audience of around 70 million spectators across the world.

== Participation ==
Around 3000 participants from 46 countries competed in the Games. Of these countries, 43 are full members of the International Organization of the Francophonie, two are associate members (Armenia and Cyprus), and Mozambique was the sole observer nation in attendance. Furthermore, two participating governments (New Brunswick and Quebec) also competed.

- Armenia
- French Community of Belgium
- Benin
- Bulgaria
- Burkina Faso
- Burundi
- Cambodia
- Cameroon
- Canada
  - New Brunswick
  - Quebec
- Cape Verde
- Central African Republic
- Chad
- Comoros
- Ivory Coast
- Cyprus
- Democratic Republic of the Congo
- Djibouti
- Dominica
- Egypt
- Equatorial Guinea
- France
- Gabon
- Greece
- Guinea
- Guinea-Bissau
- Haiti
- Laos
- Lebanon (host)
- Luxembourg
- Macedonia
- Madagascar
- Mali
- Mauritius
- Mauritania
- Monaco
- Morocco
- Mozambique
- Niger
- Republic of the Congo
- Romania
- Rwanda
- Senegal
- Seychelles
- Switzerland
- Togo
- Tunisia
- Vietnam

== Calendar ==
Games calendar
Opening Ceremony	Event competitions	Event finals	Closing ceremony

September/October	26th	27th	28th	29th	30th	1st	2nd	3rd	4th	5th	6th	Total
Ceremonies		●									●	
Sport events
Athletics						● ● ●	● ● ● ● ● ● ● ● ● ● ● ● ●	● ● ● ● ● ● ● ● ●	● ● ● ● ● ● ● ● ●	● ● ● ● ● ● ● ● ● ● ● ●		46
Basketball										●		1
Boxing										● ● ● ● ● ● ● ● ● ● ●		11
Soccer											●	1
Judo			● ● ● ● ●	● ● ● ● ●	● ● ● ●							14
Table tennis						● ●		●	●			4
Beach volleyball									● ●			2
Cultural events
Song									1			1
Storytelling							1					1
Dance								1				1
Sculpture								1				1
Photography								1				1
Literature								1				1
Painting								1				1
Total Gold medals	0	0	5	5	4	5	14	15	13	24	1	86

== Games ==
=== Opening ceremony ===
The opening ceremony began with performances from the Internal Security Forces marching band, as well as military formation displays by Lebanese Army soldiers. The ceremony was attended by delegates from 44 nations, including French Prime Minister François Fillon, Prince Albert of Monaco and Abdou Diouf, Secretary General of the International Francophonie Organization (OIF). Lebanese President Michel Sleiman gave a welcoming speech praising Lebanon as a country that exemplifies the International Francophonie Organization's values of "solidarity, diversity and excellence"; and officially inaugurated the games in the presence of top Lebanese officials including caretaker Prime Minister Fouad Siniora, Prime Minister-designate Saad Hariri and Parliament Speaker Nabih Berri.

The participants in the games paraded in the stadium preceded by their national colors; many teams dressed in traditional national costumes, and some danced to the background music that was specially composed by Lebanese artist Khaled Mouzannar. The flag bearer of the OIF was Maxime Chaya, the first Lebanese mountaineer to climb the Seven Summits. Chaya's speech was followed by the formal athlete's and judge's oath.

An Arabic and Phoenician-style sound and light performance followed; the performance was produced by Daniel Charpentier and featured 1200 musicians, dancers and performers enacting key moments in the cultural history of Lebanon in the form of plays, songs and poetic recitals. The show revolved around a large 9,000 square metres (97,000 sq ft) screen displaying Lebanon's six-millennium history from prehistory, the maritime Phoenician city states in Byblos, Tripoli, Sidon and Tyre, to the Roman period Baalbek relics, the later Arabic arts, and finally the modern and metropolitan Beirut. Dance routines included a mass rendition of the traditional Lebanese dance, the Dabke, as well as a troop of whirling dervishes and a contemporary dance performance, specially choreographed for the occasion. Lebanese singer Majida El Roumi sang her homage to the capital city, "Ya Beirut", before being joined for a duet with Senegalese artist Youssou N'Dour. The music of world-renowned Lebanese composer Gabriel Yared and Khaled Mouzannar accompanied the ceremony. A fireworks display marked the end of the official opening ceremony, followed by a concert by Youssou N'Dour.

=== Events ===
The 2009 Jeux de la Francophonie featured 13 competitions, 7 sport events and 6 cultural contests. Canadian athlete Jared MacLeod broke the games record in the 110 meters hurdles race, Yahya Berrabah from Morocco scored both a games and a national record in the men's long jump discipline. Ihab Al Sayed Abdelrahman from Egypt and Lindy Leveau-Agricole from the Seychelles scored new games records respectively for men's and women's javelin throw and Manuela Montebrun from France also broke the game record for women's hammer throw. The Cypriot women's basketball team which had won four matches was disqualified for exceeding the permitted number of naturalized players.

==== Sports ====
- Athletics
- Basketball
- Beach volleyball
- Boxing
- Football (soccer)
- Judo
- Table tennis

==== Cultural ====
- Song
- Storytelling
- Traditional inspiration dance
- Poetry
- Painting
- Photography
- Sculpture

=== Medal count ===
Total Games medal count

* Host nation (Lebanon)

Rank	Nation	Gold	Silver	Bronze	Total
1	France	23	9	17	49
2	Morocco	12	20	15	47
3	Romania	10	4	10	24
4	Canada	9	10	18	37
5	Egypt	4	5	5	14
6	Mauritius	3	3	2	8
7	Rwanda	3	2	0	5
8	Quebec	3	0	4	7
9	Tunisia	2	7	5	14
10	Cameroon	2	2	8	12
11	Ivory Coast	2	2	1	5
12	Chad	2	0	0	2
13	Senegal	1	8	5	14
14	Vietnam	1	2	1	4
15	(Wallonia) French Community of Belgium	1	1	4	6
16	Switzerland	1	1	3	5
17	Burkina Faso	1	1	1	3
18	Congo	1	0	3	4
18	DR Congo	1	0	3	4
20	Macedonia	1	0	0	1
20	Seychelles	1	0	0	1
22	Lebanon*	0	4	2	6
23	Mali	0	1	1	2
24	Armenia	0	1	0	1
24	Benin	0	1	0	1
26	Bulgaria	0	0	1	1
26	Burundi	0	0	1	1
26	Central African Republic	0	0	1	1
26	Luxembourg	0	0	1	1
Totals (29 entries)		84	84	112	280

=== Closing ceremony ===
The 2009 Jeux de la Francophonie games closing ceremony took place in BIEL, downtown Beirut, on 7 September. The festivities were opened with a classical concert led by conductor Harout Fazlian, followed by a folkloric African music concert specially composed for the occasion. Eliya Francis and Cynthia Samaha interpreted Mozart's opera Bastien und Bastienne, and the following set by Canzone Napoletana was also interpreted by Francis. A large Zorba ring preceded the concert of the Lebanese pop artist Ragheb Alama accompanied by belly dancers. The festivities ended with an electronic music event by the Franco Elektro competition winner DJ Rio Tony-T, who opened for Antoine Clamaran
