= Millennium station (Ottawa) =

Bus station

Millennium
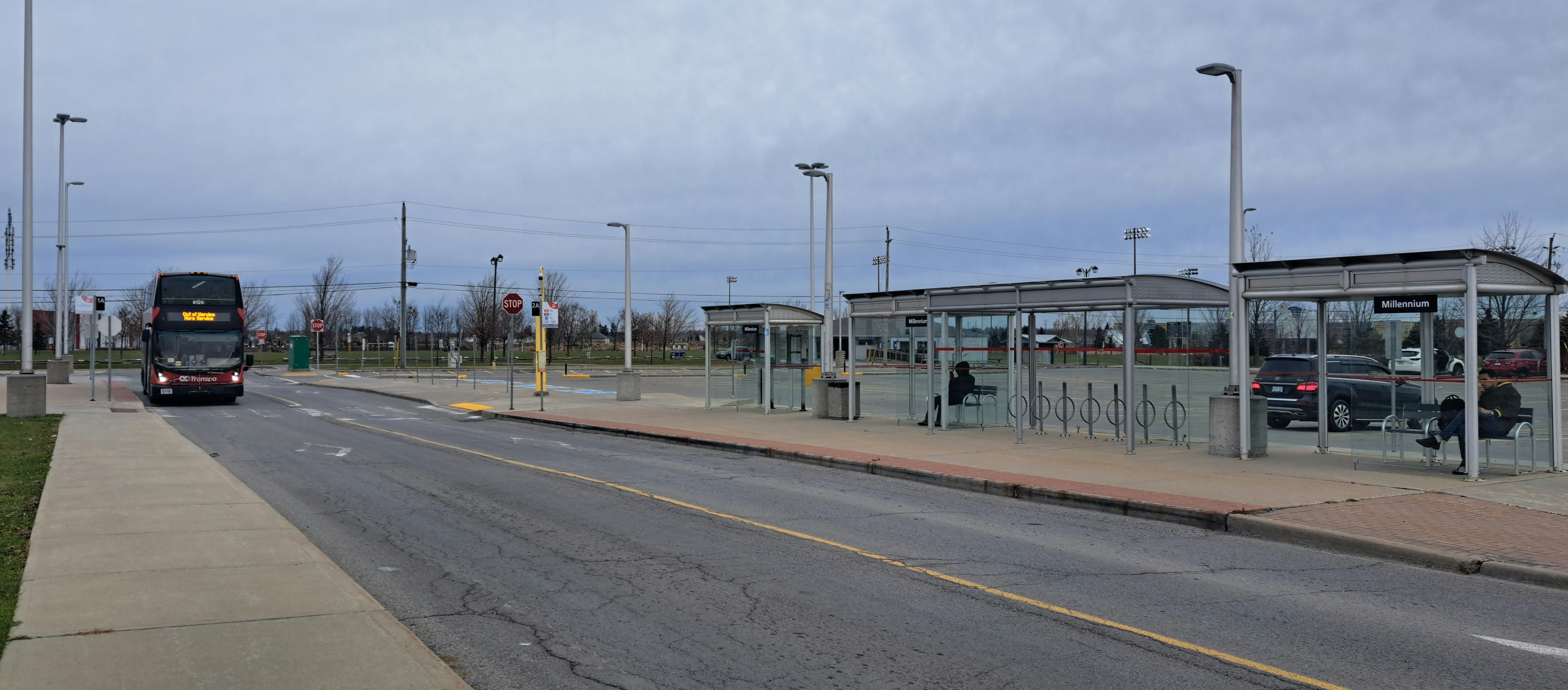
- The Millennium bus station in Ottawa

General information
- Location: Millennium Boulevard, Ottawa, Ontario; Canada
- Coordinates: 45°27′56″N 75°26′54″W
- Owner: OC Transpo
- Platforms: Platform 1A is reserved for passenger drop-off. Platform 2A is used for passenger pick-up.

Other information
- Station code: 3076

History
- Opened: September 2007

Services
Preceding station	OC Transpo	Following station
Trim toward Blair	Route 39	Terminus
Location

Millennium station is a small bus terminal and park and ride operated by OC Transpo in the suburb of Orléans in Ottawa, Ontario, Canada, just south of the intersection of Innes Road and Trim Road. Officially opening in September 2007, it is the easternmost station in Ottawa's bus rapid transit system and it serves as the eastern terminus of routes 25, 30 and 39. It is also located just southwest of École secondaire Gisèle-Lalonde, as well as Millennium Sports Park being in very close distance.

The station first appeared in OC Transpo's route network as part of their September 2, 2007, service change. In addition to the new stop, the City of Ottawa approved the construction of both park and ride and bus layover facilities, which officially opened in 2009.

In Ottawa's 2013 transportation master plan, Millennium was designated as the eastern terminus of a future Transitway segment that would connect to Blair station and be open by 2031.

== Service ==
The following routes serve Millennium station:

Millennium station service
Frequent routes	25 39
Local routes	30
School routes	618 630

=== Notes ===
- School routes 33, 35, 611, 612, 632, and 639 serve the nearby stops at Millennium / Trim and École secondaire Gisèle-Lalonde, with no service at the station itself.

== See also ==
- OC Transpo
- Transitway (Ottawa)
- O-Train
