= Petrie Island =

Park and nature area in Ottawa, Canada

- IUCN category III (natural monument or feature)
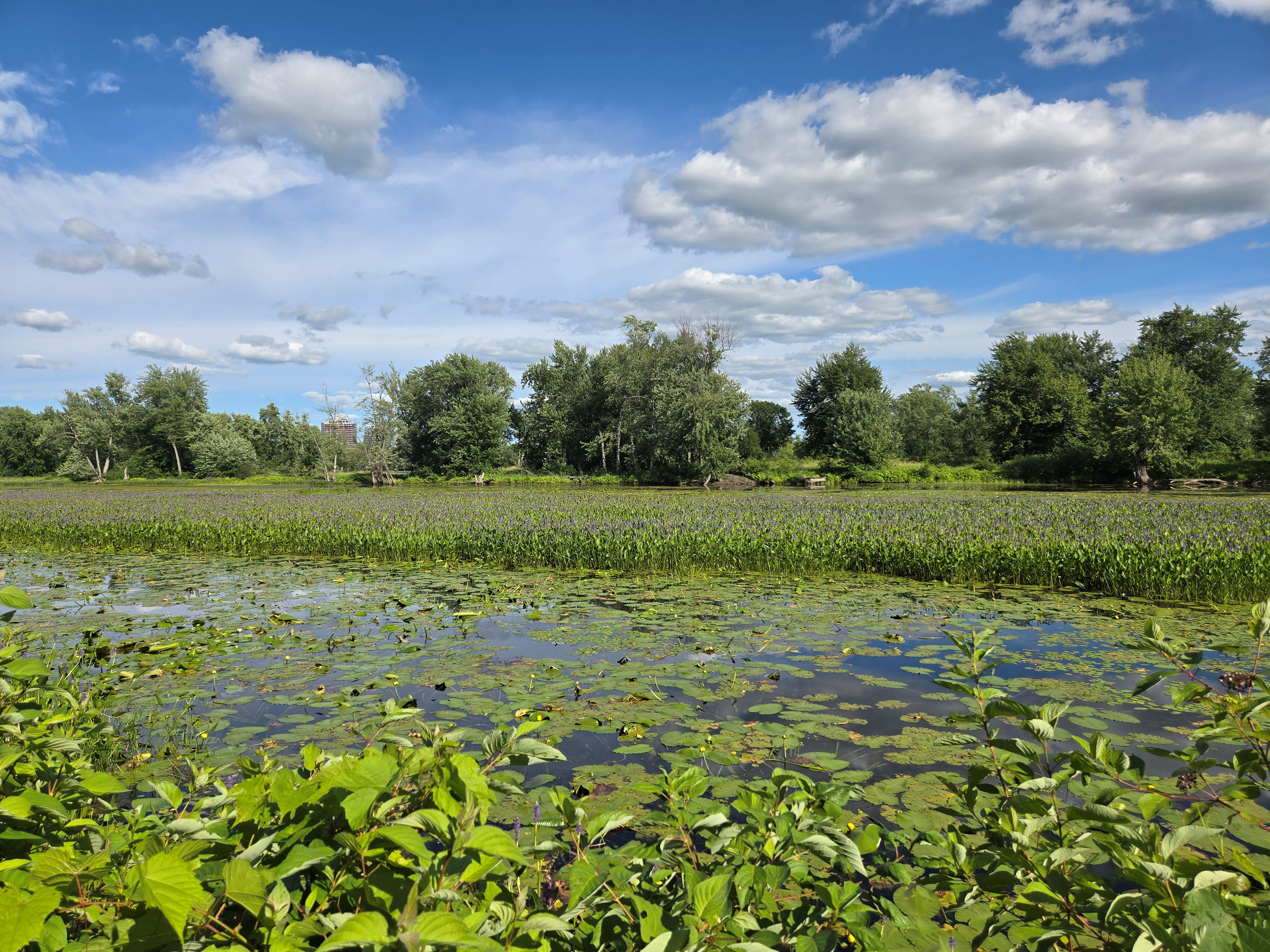
- Turtle Pond in the center of the Petrie Islands (July 2025 photo)
- Interactive map of Petrie Island
- Location: Ottawa, Ontario, Canada
- Coordinates: 45°30′02″N 75°29′39″W
- Area: 323 ha (800 acres)
- Governing body: City of Ottawa

Petrie Island is an island of parkland and recreational areas situated in the Ottawa River in the Orleans subdivision in the eastern part of the city of Ottawa, Ontario, Canada. The island has several nearby islands and the general collection of islands are collectively known as the Petrie Islands.

The islands were formed from clay and sand that was deposited following the end of the last ice age. The area incorporates provincially significant wetlands and wooded areas that provide habitat for plants, animals and birds, especially during spring and fall migration. Extensive flooding occurs during the spring. The size of the islands was reduced when water levels were raised by the hydroelectric dam at Carillon.

The island was named after a local landowner Captain Archibald Petrie, an early inhabitant of Cumberland Township. In 1955, Donat Grandmaître purchased the island and set up a sand and gravel extraction facility. In 1983, the island was purchased by the Regional Municipality of Ottawa-Carleton, which has since been subsumed by the City of Ottawa. The natural portions of the island include the Grandmaitre Ecological Reserve, the Bill Holland Trail, the Al Tweddle Picnic Area, the Friends of Petrie Island Interpretive Centre, and Stuemer Park. Stuemer Park was named after an Ottawa family who sailed from Petrie Island around the world, returning to Petrie to complete their voyage.

There is a large sandy beach area at the northeast corner of the island, with one beach (River Beach) on the main Ottawa River, and the other (East Beach) on the downstream side. Both beaches are operated by the City of Ottawa. They are supervised by lifeguards during the summer between noon and 7 pm, 7 days a week. Public washrooms are available in the beach pavilion. Paid parking for 320 vehicles is available.

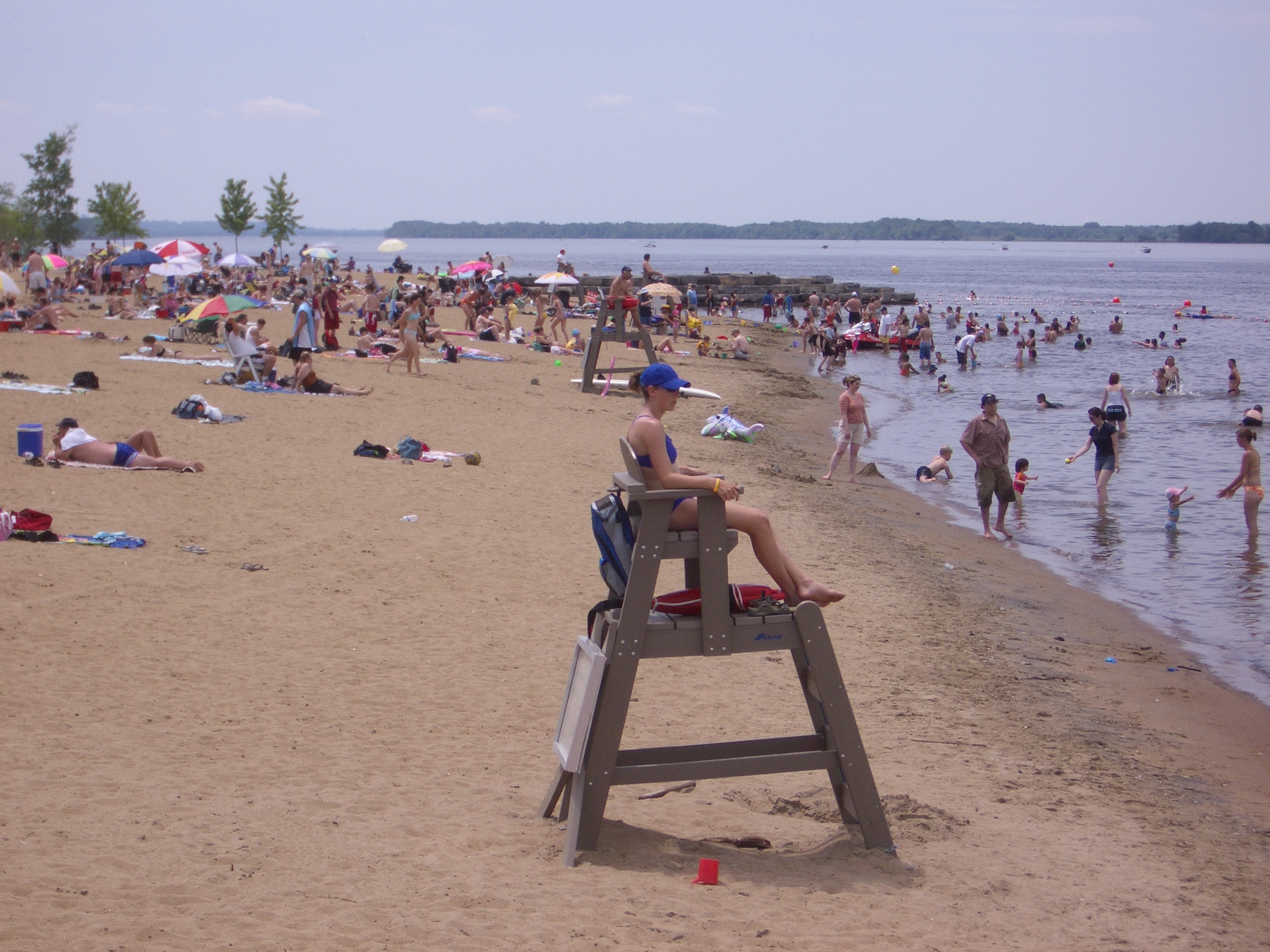
Part of the public beach overlooking the Ottawa River (2005 photo)

The Petrie Island Park area is classified as Significant Wetlands by the province of Ontario, which defines it as an Area of Natural and Scientific Interest. One of the last relatively natural environments on the Ontario side of the Ottawa River below the nation’s capital, the archipelago features a Carolinian deciduous swamp forest, possibly the only one in Eastern Canada north of Toronto. Seasonal flooding, extensive sand deposits, abundant water plants and thin but fertile soils have helped maintain a variety of life not found in many other places and its habitats are extremely rich. There are several species of turtles, some rare, and well over 130 species of birds have been identified at Petrie. There are also provincially rare plants, including stands of hackberry trees. There is a network of trails through a nature preserve, and a small interpretive center, both maintained by volunteers.
