= Cumberland, Ontario =

Historic township in Ottawa, Ontario, Canada

Cumberland
- Former municipality
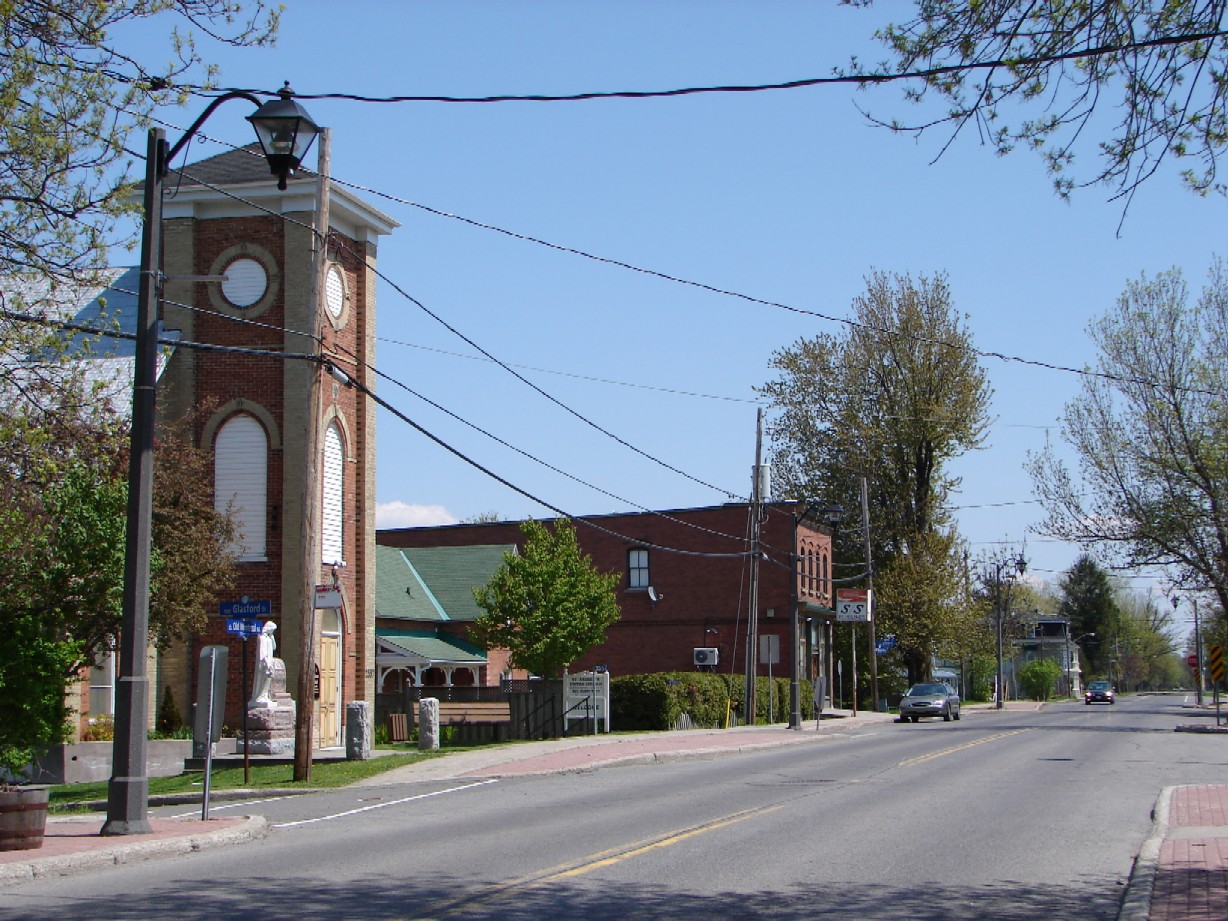
- Old Montreal Road in Cumberland Village

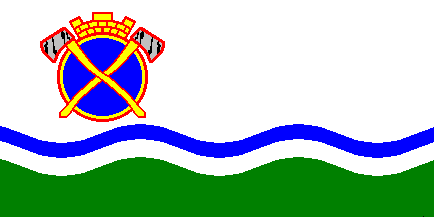
- Flag

- Map of City of Ottawa showing the former Cumberland Township and Cumberland Village
- Coordinates: 45°26′00″N 75°26′02″W
- Country: Canada
- Province: Ontario
- Municipality: Ottawa
- Established: 1800
- Incorporated: 1969 (township); 1999 (city)
- Amalgamated: 2001

Government
  - Mayor: Mark Sutcliffe
  - City councillors: Catherine Kitts; Matthew Luloff
  - Members of Parliament: Francis Drouin
  - Members of Provincial Parliament: Stéphane Sarrazin
- Time zone: UTC−5 (Eastern (EST))
  - Summer (DST): UTC−4 (EDT)
- Area codes: 613, 343

Cumberland is a former municipality and now geographic township in eastern Ontario, Canada. It was an incorporated township from 1800 to 1999, when it was incorporated as the City of Cumberland, then ceased to be a separate municipality in 2001, when it was amalgamated into the city of Ottawa. It now exists only as a geographic township.

== History ==
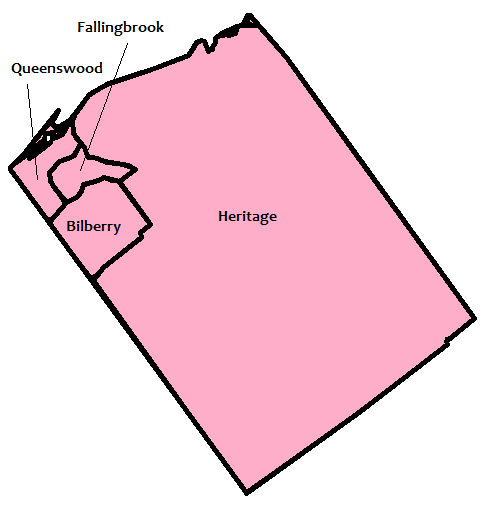
Cumberland, Ontario ward map 1997

Cumberland was originally incorporated as a township in 1800. It took its name from the Duke of Cumberland (later King of Hanover).

The township comprised the eastern portion of Ottawa's Orléans suburb as well as the communities of Cumberland Village, Carlsbad Springs, Navan, Notre-Dame-des-Champs, Sarsfield, and Vars.

Almost 200 years after it was first incorporated, Cumberland became a city in 1999. City status was short-lived however as the municipality was amalgamated with of Ottawa in 2001.

Cumberland now forms part of Ottawa. The largest portion of the former municipality now forms Orléans South-Navan Ward, previously named Cumberland Ward, and is represented at Ottawa City Council. Most of the suburban neighbourhood of Orléans, which straddled the former boundary between Cumberland and the city of Gloucester, has been split off from Cumberland and Gloucester and is now joined in Orléans East-Cumberland and Orléans West-Innes Wards. Thus, Orléans South-Navan Ward is now primarily rural in nature, made up of historic villages that now comprise bedroom communities of Ottawa.

== Attractions ==
=== Cumberland Heritage Village Museum ===
The Cumberland Heritage Village Museum, which depicts rural life in a village setting during the 1920s and 1930s, celebrated its 35th anniversary on September 25, 2011. The museum features a General Store, one-room schoolhouse and antique vehicles at the village garage, a tractor-pulled wagon ride, and farm animals. The former Knox Presbyterian/United Church building (1904–1980) and its artefacts were relocated from Vars to the Cumberland Heritage Village Museum. A memorial Roll of Honor and plaque from the Knox Presbyterian Church are dedicated to its members who served and to those who gave their lives in the First World War. A memorial scroll from the Knox Presbyterian Church is dedicated to its members who served in the Second World War.

Every other Sunday, the Ottawa Valley Live Steamers and Model Engineers are on site to give rides on their model trains. The museum has a collection of over 20,000 artifacts, including ceramic, textile and agricultural equipment, many of which have never been on display. The museum and artifact collection were included amongst other architecturally interesting and historically significant buildings in Doors Open Ottawa in 2012, with the museum partaking annually in the event as of 2025.

=== Other attractions ===
A memorial stands in front of St. Andrews United Church, dedicated to soldiers who lost their lives during the First and Second World Wars, as well as the Korean War.

In 2017, Dr. Ranjit Pereira opened Humanics Sanctuary and Sculpture Park, a non-commercial art object dedicated to representation of world religions, cults and ethical teaching.

== Population breakdown ==
- 2001 population: 52,430
- 2006 population: 62,694
- 2011 population: 74,581
  - Population of rural Cumberland: 11,693
    - Cumberland Village/Bella Vista/Cumberland Estates/Becketts Creek: 3,901
    - Navan/Carlsbad Springs (part)/Notre-Dame-Des-Champs (part): 3,649
    - Vars: 1,424
    - Sarsfield/Leonard/Southeast Cumberland: 2,718
  - Population of Orleans (in Cumberland): 62,888
    - Avalon / Notting Gate: 16,687
    - Queenswood Village / Chatelaine Village: 4,114
    - Springridge / Cardinal Creek: 5,004
    - Fallingbrook: 25,399
    - Queenswood Heights: 11,684
- 2016 population: 81,057
  - Population of rural Cumberland: 11,879
    - Cumberland Village/Bella Vista/Cumberland Estates/Becketts Creek: 4,101
    - Navan/Carlsbad Springs (part)/Notre-Dame-Des-Champs (part): 4,106
    - Vars: 1,514
    - Sarsfield/Leonard/Southeast Cumberland: 2,158
  - Population of Orleans (in Cumberland): 69,178
    - Avalon / Notting Gate: 23,459
    - Queenswood Village / Chatelaine Village: 4,206
    - Springridge / Cardinal Creek: 5,604
    - Fallingbrook: 24,878
    - Queenswood Heights: 11,031
- 2021 population: 88,478

== See also ==
- List of townships in Ontario
