= Sarsfield, Ontario =

Neighbourhood of Ottawa, Canada

Coordinates: 45°26′30″N 75°20′40″W

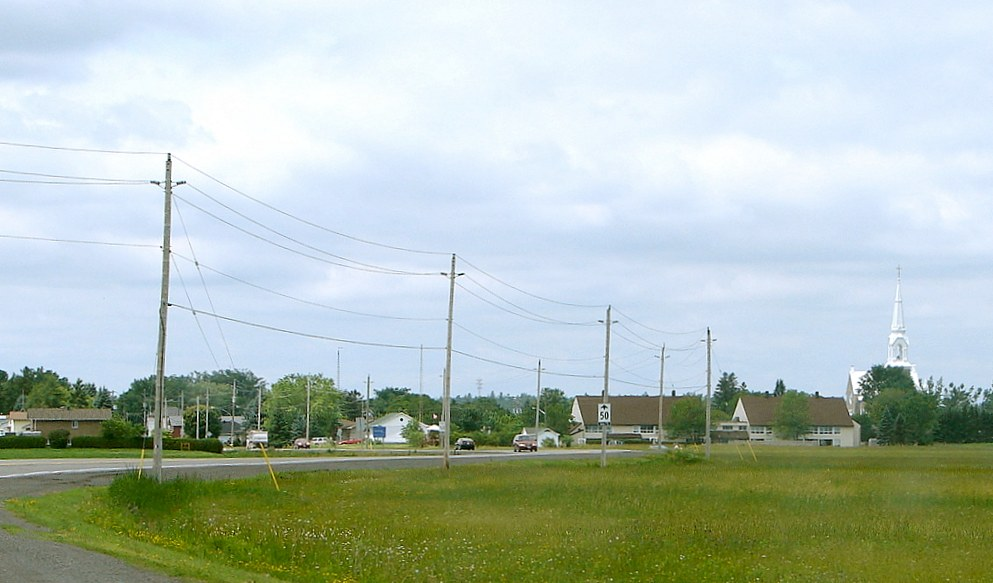
Skyline of Sarsfield

Sarsfield, Ontario is a village in Cumberland Ward in the east portion of the City of Ottawa in the former township of Cumberland.

== History ==
The first residents of Sarsfield were mostly French-Canadians from Lower Canada. In 1854, families began to establish in the Sarsfield region. Family names at that time included: Potvin, St-Denis, D'Aoust, Lafrance, Dessaint and Ethier. One of these colonizers, Sévère D'Aoust, bought land from the Crown and later gave part of this land for the construction of a Roman Catholic church. The construction of the church had such an impact on the village that it was known as Daoust's Corner. The region was also known as Bear Brook. Construction for the new church was completed in 1886. The church celebrated its 125th anniversary in 2011. In June 2011, strong winds and intense lightning caused the churches's steeple to fall off. It was replaced a few months later. It was destroyed a second time after the May 2022 Canadian derecho

The village was renamed Sarsfield in 1874 when an Irishman, Michael O'Meara, opened a post office and gave it the name of an Irish hero, Patrick Sarsfield. In 2000, the Township of Cumberland was amalgamated to the City of Ottawa.

== Notable people ==
- Don Boudria, former Liberal Party of Canada MP from 1984 to 2006, and government house leader
- Ferdinand Larose (1888–1955), agronomist, who planted the Larose Forest was born in Sarsfield.
