= Trim Road =

Road in Orléans, Ottawa, ON, Canada

Trim Road (Ottawa Road #57) is an arterial road in the eastern end of Orléans, Ontario, a suburb of Ottawa. From its intersection with Jeanne d'Arc Boulevard N, Trim runs south through the eastern suburban areas of Orleans and then south into rural former Cumberland Township. It travels through the community of Navan before ending at Perreault Road. It has a total length of 14.4 km (8.9 mi) and connects with Ottawa Regional Road 174 that connects with Highway 417 further to the west. Its status as a numbered road in Ottawa's city road status ends at Innes Road on the south side of Orleans.

Two OC Transpo public transit bus stations are served along Trim road, with Trim station to the north, and Millennium station to the south. Route 39 serves Trim road from the junction with Ottawa Regional Road 174, south to Millennium Boulevard, serving businesses at Taylor Creek Drive and the communities of Fallingbrook, Cardinal Creek and Springridge. Trim station was the eastern terminus of the former Route 95 until the route was cancelled in 2019, and will become the eastern terminus of O-Train Line 1 in 2026.

Trim Road south of Innes marks the border between the eighth and ninth concessions of Cumberland Township.

Trim represents the eastern boundary of the communities of Avalon and Notting Gate which brought extensive volume to Trim. Some commercial space is currently added in the area and it may represent the eastern terminus of a future transit corridor and possible east–west light rail line.

Trim and the nearby rural community of Navan, Ontario are named, respectively, after Trim and Navan in County Meath, Ireland.
