= Place d'Orléans =

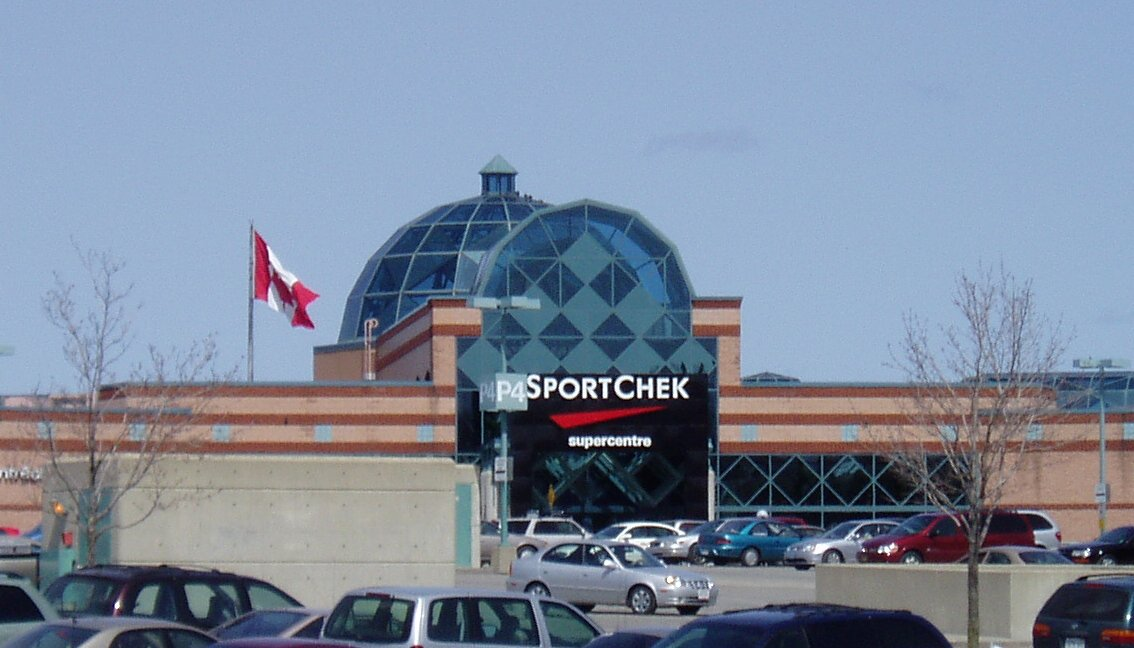
- Place d'Orléans from the Sport Chek entrance
- Coordinates: 45°28′40″N 75°30′59″W
- Address: 110 Place d'Orléans Drive; Ottawa, Ontario; K1C 2L9
- Opened: 1979
- Owner: Primaris REIT
- Num. of stores: 130
- Num. of anchor tenants: 3
- Floor area: 734,477 sq ft or 68,235.1 m^{2}
- Floors: 2
- Public transit: Place d'Orléans
- Website: www.placedorleans.com

Place d'Orléans (/plæs dɔːrˈliːnz/; French: [plas dɔʁleɑ̃]) is a shopping mall in Orléans suburb of Ottawa, Ontario, Canada. The property is about 740,000 sq ft (69,000 m^{2}) and has approximately 132 stores and services.

Place d'Orléans was originally constructed in 1979 and underwent major expansions in 1984, 1988, and 1990 to arrive at its current size and configuration. It was one of the last enclosed malls built in Ottawa. Like many of its counterparts in North America, Place d'Orléans has been struggling to survive in the era of the big-box "power centres". The Hudson's Bay at Place d'Orléans expanded in 1999, opening a large "home store". This resulted in Hudson's Bay taking over a large section of the north side's upper level further reducing the number of smaller stores. At the same time Hudson's Bay relocated into the former Eaton's location. The mall's food court underwent a renovation under which it was moved to the ground floor of the mall where it was opened on November 1, 2019. Place d'Orléans's architecture later inspired the Meadowhall Shopping Centre in Sheffield, England.

The mall's previous anchors have included Eaton's, Woolco, Robinson's, Consumers Distributing, Wal-Mart, Zellers, Target, and Hudson's Bay, many of which were located northeastern wing of the mall which was demolished and rebuilt in 2017. The new space houses Mark's and Aub44. Some of Place d'Orléans's current tenants include Sport Chek, Mark's, H&M, Dollarama, Bath & Body Works, The Body Shop, Ardene, GoodLife Fitness, Tim Hortons, Starbucks, New York Fries, Subway, and A&W. The mall has also housed non-traditional tenants including the Royal Canadian Mounted Police (RCMP), the Canada Mortgage and Housing Corporation (CMHC), and a Service Canada passport office.

Place d'Orléans is served by Place d'Orléans station. The station serves as an east-end hub for OC Transpo, connecting local bus routes to the Transitway. The station also has a park and ride facility on the opposite side of Highway 174 which is linked by a pedestrian bridge. The expansion of O-Train Line 1 will see Place d'Orléans station converted into an LRT station in 2025.
