= Blair station =

Transit station in Ottawa, Canada

Blair
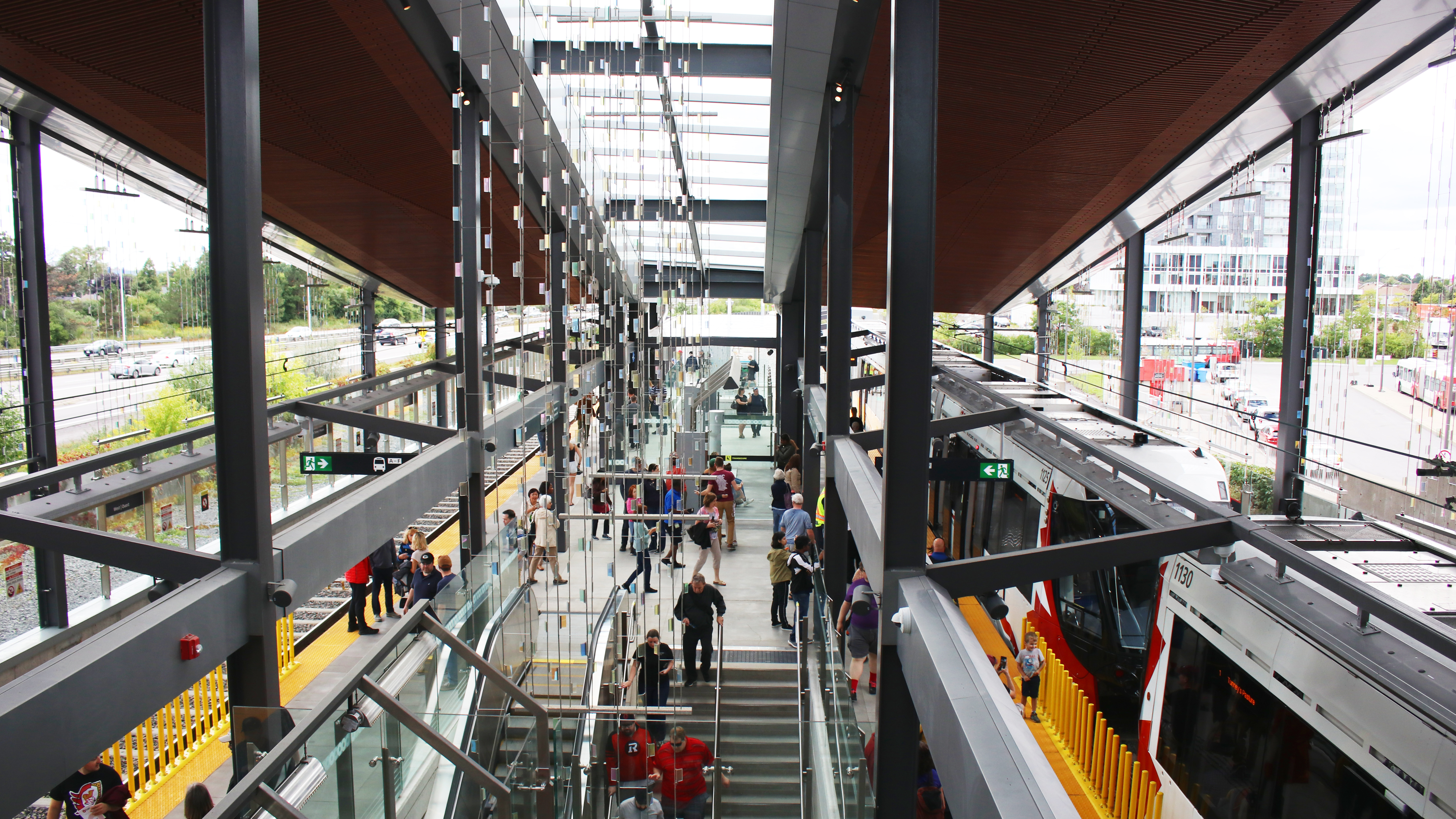

General information
- Location: Ottawa, Ontario; Canada
- Coordinates: 45°25′52″N 75°36′30″W
- Owner: OC Transpo
- Platforms: Centre platform (LRT); Side platform x 2 (BRT)
- Tracks: 2

Construction
- Parking: Yes
- Cycle facilities: Yes
- Accessible: Yes

History
- Opened: 1989 (BRT station); September 14, 2019 (LRT station)
- Rebuilt: 2015–2019

Services
Preceding station	OC Transpo	Following station
Cyrville toward Tunney's Pasture	Line 1	Terminus
Terminus	Route 39	Montréal toward Millennium

Future services
Preceding station	OC Transpo	Following station
Cyrville toward Tunney's Pasture	Line 1 Opens 2026	Montréal toward Trim
Location

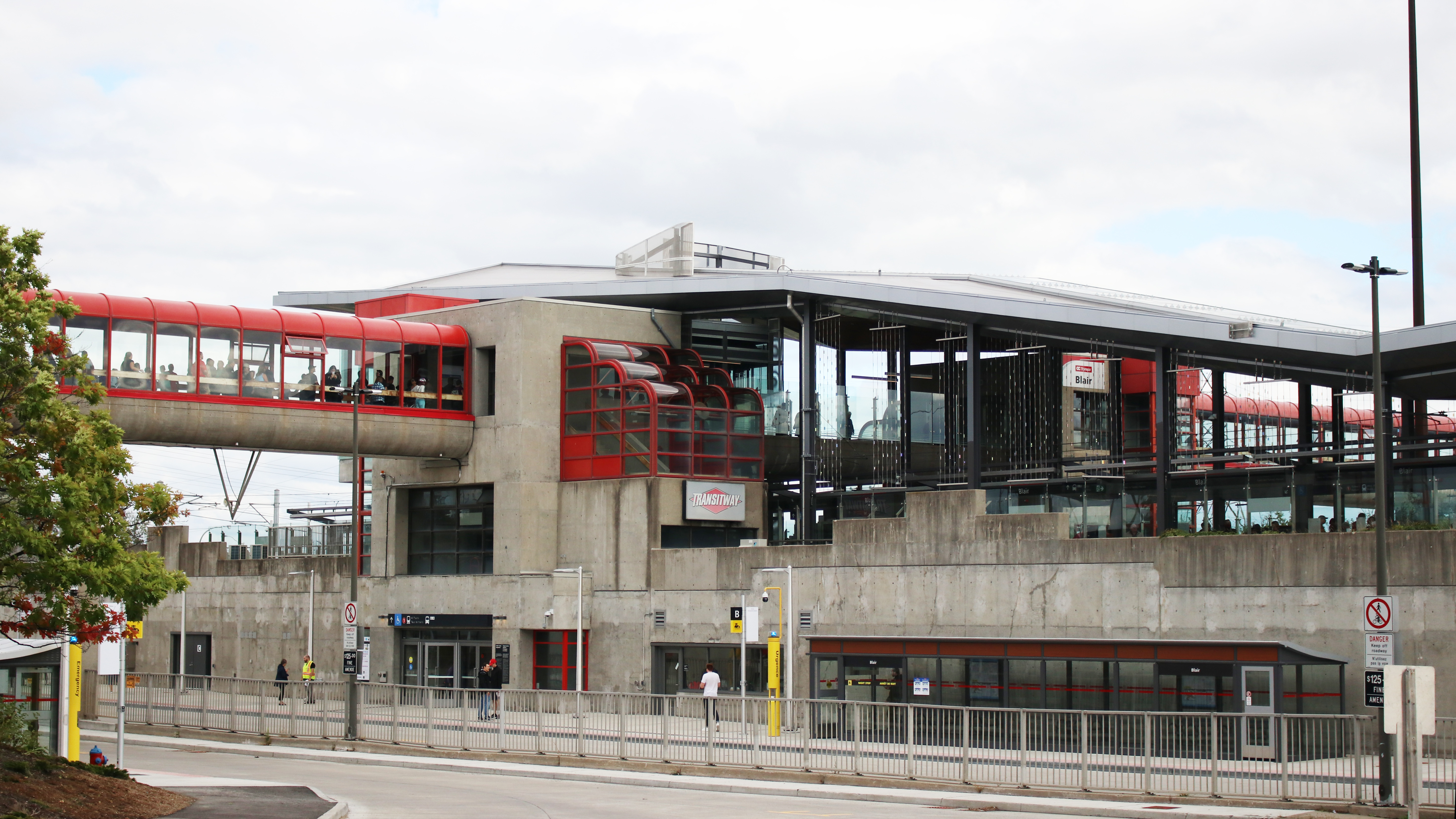
Main station building viewing from bus terminal

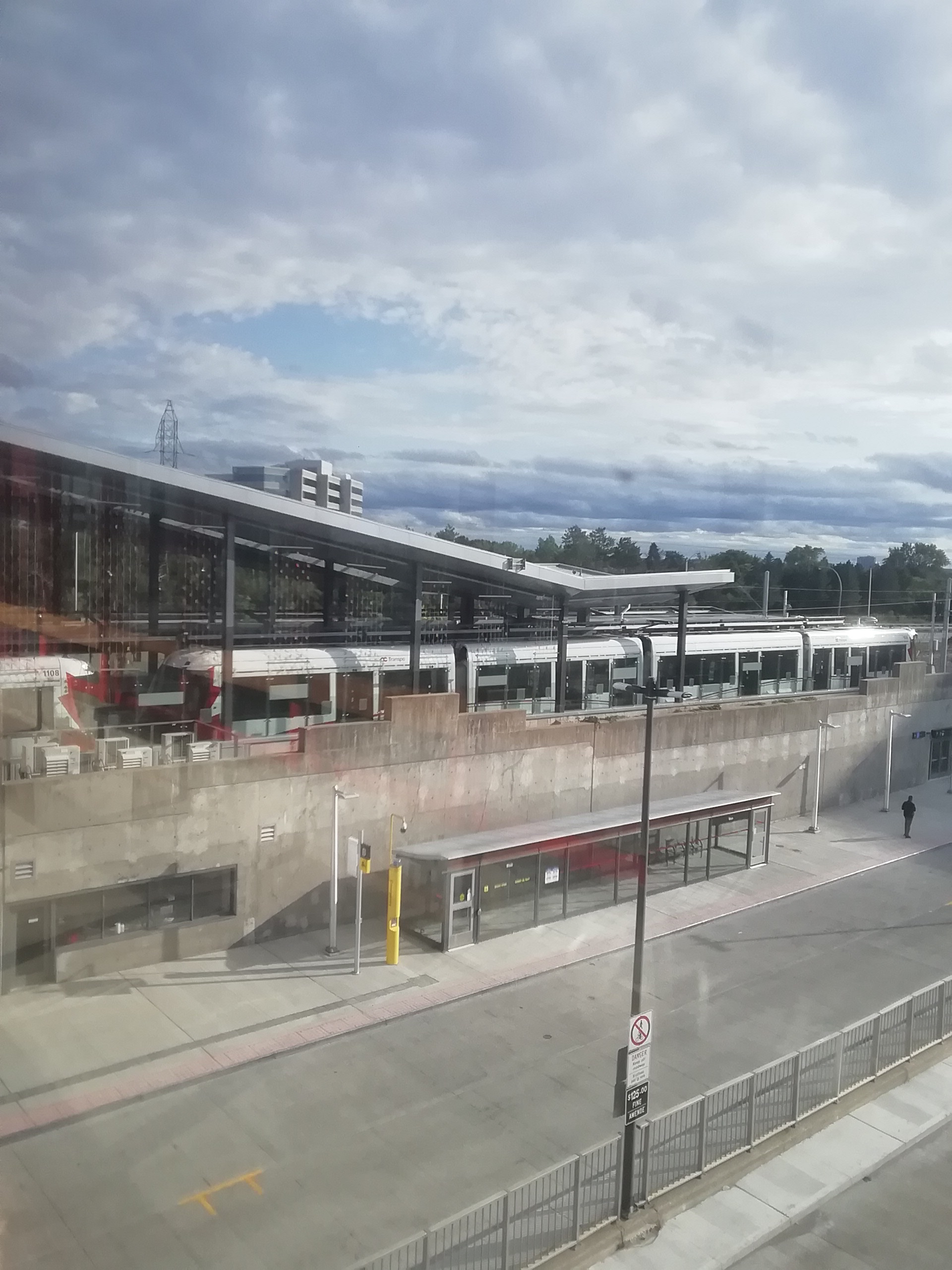
Side view of Blair station

Blair station is a station on Ottawa's O-Train and Transitway systems located at Blair Road and Regional Road 174. It is a major transfer point for commuters within urban Gloucester and Orléans.

== Location ==
This station is adjacent to the Gloucester Centre shopping complex, and nearby the Scotiabank Theatre Ottawa mega-movie theatre, a small bank, and other major retail stores. Shoppers City East located across Blair Road contains also several other major stores such as Canadian Tire. Headquarters of the Canadian Security Intelligence Service is located within a close proximity of the station. A long pedestrian overpass for the Queensway provides access to office complexes, a small park and ride parking lot, and the Pineview residential area.

== Transitway ==
Prior to the construction of the Confederation Line, this was the last station in the grade separated eastern leg of the transitway; after this point, buses used exclusive shoulder lanes on the Queensway beyond this point towards Orleans.

The main Transitway platforms closed down prior to Confederation Line construction as of 28 June 2015. The platforms reopened on September 14, 2019, when Confederation Line service began.

== Confederation Line ==
Blair station is the eastern terminus of Line 1 of the O-Train. It is an elevated island platform station, with both platform faces being used by terminating and departing trains. This will change when service is extended towards Trim in 2026.

The overpass of the previous Transitway station, located above the platforms at the concourse level of the station, was retained as part of the new O-Train station.

The station offers transfer to Transitway buses within the fare-paid zone—i.e. without needing to present proof of payment to transfer between buses and the station. The bus terminal is located on the ground level of the station. There are many heated shelters along the terminal with bus times for routes which serve each lettered platform.

The station's artwork, entitled Lightscape, is by CJ Fleury and Catherine Widgery. It is a series of suspended installations featuring brightly coloured elements that catch the light.

== Service ==
The following routes serve Blair station as of March 5th, 2025:

Key
Line 1 (O-Train) Line 2 (O-Train) Line 4 (O-Train)	O-Train
E1	Shuttle Express
R1 R2 R4	O-Train replacement bus routes
N75	Night routes
40 12	Frequent routes
99 162	Local routes
275	Connexion routes
303	Shopper routes
405	Event routes
646	School routes
STO	Société de transport de l'Outaouais routes
Additional info: Line 1: Confederation Line; Line 2: Trillium Line; Line 4: Airport Link; Routes 5 to 199: Custom routing that that connects to Line 1 and/or 2; Routes 200 to 299: Connexion (peak-period only routes that connect to the O-Train); Routes 301 to 305: Shopper Routes (limited rural service); Routes 404 to 406: Canadian Tire Centre events; Routes 450 to 456: Lansdowne Park events; Routes 600 to 699: School Routes; Route R1: replaces Line 1 when it is out of service; Route R2: replaces Line 2 when it is out of service; Route R4: replaces Line 4 when it is out of service; Routes N39 to N98: night service (replaces Line 1 and N98 replaces Line 4); White backgrounds: limited service; Last two digits represent service area: 00s and 10s – Central; 20s – Gloucester; 30s – Orléans; 40s – Ottawa East; 50s – Ottawa West; 60s – Kanata, Stittsville; 70s – Barrhaven; 80s – Nepean; 90s – South Keys

Stop	Routes
West O-Train	Line 1 (O-Train)
East O-Train	Under construction (opening in 2026)
A West, Peak Southeast	15 24 25 125 222 226 228 624
B East	38 237 621
C Rail Replacement, Shuttle Express, but used primarily for route terminations and passenger dropoffs	R1 E1
D East	21 25 30 32 33 34 35 39 234 630 631
F On-demand	none
H School, Shopper	26 35 302 451 619 621 624 628 630 631
I West, Local, Shopper	12 15 23 24 26 N39 42 302

=== Notes ===
- Route 125 operates every 30 min on weekends during the summer months and runs one trip a day on weekdays in both directions during regular service.
- Stops B and I will be the only stops active after 9 PM. Routes that normally serve stops A, C and D will serve B instead, and routes serving stops F and H will serve I instead.
