= Stephen Blais =

Canadian politician (born 1980)

Stephen Blais MPP
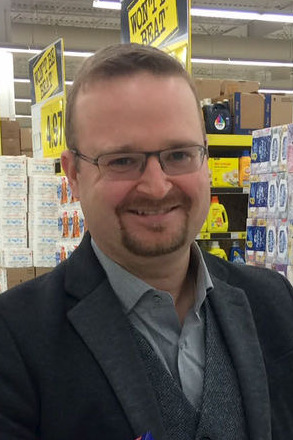
- Stephen Blais in 2017

Member of the Ontario Provincial Parliament for Orléans
- Incumbent
- Assumed office February 27, 2020
- Preceded by: Marie-France Lalonde

Ottawa City Councillor
- In office December 1, 2010 – March 5, 2020
- Preceded by: Rob Jellett
- Succeeded by: Catherine Kitts
- Constituency: Cumberland Ward

Ottawa-Carleton Catholic School Board Trustee
- In office December 1, 2006 – November 30, 2010
- Preceded by: Des Curley
- Succeeded by: Brian Coburn
- Constituency: Zone 3 (Orléans & Cumberland)

Personal details
- Born: July 20, 1980 (age 46) Ottawa, Ontario, Canada
- Party: Ontario Liberal Party
- Spouse: Marta Blais
- Awards: 2013 Francophile de l'année - ACFO; 2013 Orléans Chamber of Commerce Community Service Business of the Year
- Website: https://www.stephenblais.ca

Stephen Christopher Leonard Blais MPP (born July 20, 1980) is a Canadian politician who has served as the member of Provincial Parliament (MPP) for Orléans since February 27, 2020.

Before being elected to the Legislative Assembly of Ontario, he was the Ottawa City Councillor for Cumberland Ward. He won the ward in the 2010 Ottawa municipal election, defeating the incumbent Rob Jellett. He was re-elected in the 2014 and 2018 municipal elections.

== Early life and career ==
Blais was born at the Grace Hospital in Ottawa to Stephen and Debbie Blais (née Kane) and grew up in the Queenswood Heights neighbourhood of Orléans in the former Cumberland Township. Upon graduating from St. Peter Catholic High School, he attended the University of Ottawa to pursue a bachelor's degree in political science. Following university, he served as Executive Assistant to Jim Watson while Watson served in the Ontario Cabinet. Blais later moved to Carleton University where he worked as a media and communications advisor.

Prior to being elected as a councillor, Blais served as an Ottawa Catholic School Board Trustee for Orléans-Cumberland. He was first elected as a Trustee in 2006 when he defeated the incumbent.

== Political career ==
=== School trustee ===
As part of his election campaign, Blais promised to donate the pay raise trustees voted for themselves. In 2006, Blais endowed a bursary at Carleton University for high school students from Orleans, Ontario.

=== Ottawa City Council ===
In 2010, Blais was elected the city councillor for Cumberland Ward, defeating the two-term incumbent, Rob Jellett. In his first term, he secured an environmental assessment for the proposed widening Highway 174 and pushed to extend light rail transit to Orléans.

In 2011, Blais successfully spearheaded a campaign to ban smoking on outdoor patios in Ottawa.

In 2013, Blais proposed that Ontario should re-upload Highway 174 and if not, allow the City of Ottawa to introduce a toll on out-of-town users to help pay for the much needed widening of the highway with the addition of a dedicated bus lane to Rockland. Ottawa City Council received a direction to pursue the uploading of Highway 174 and if not, to designate it as a toll highway under Subsection 40(2) of the Municipal Act, 2001 if Council so chooses in the future. The idea was well received by residents of Orléans.

In his first term of office, Blais announced a plan to partner with the local homebuilding industry to complete an $8 million expansion of Millennium Park.

In 2014, Blais was named Chair of the City of Ottawa Transit Commission. The Transit Commission is the body charged with oversight of the City's public transit provider OC Transpo.

Blais was re-elected in the 2014 and 2018 municipal elections.

=== Provincial politics ===
In October 2019, Blais announced that he would be seeking the Liberal nomination for the provincial riding of Orléans, which had been left vacant when Marie-France Lalonde stepped down to run for the federal Liberal Party. He won the nomination on November 9. Blais won the February 27 by-election with 55 per cent of the vote, defeating his nearest rival, Progressive Conservative candidate Natalie Montgomery, by more than 8,000 votes. This is the largest majority in Orléans in more than 30 years.

In 2021, Blais introduced a private member's bill, Uploading Highways 174 and 17 Act, 2021, to return Highway 174 and Highway 17 back to provincial jurisdiction. The two highways had been downloaded to the municipal governments in the 1990s.

In 2023, Blais introduced a private member's bill that would allow a city councillor who had behaved disreputably to be removed from office. It was voted down on the second reading.

He was re-elected in the 2022 and 2025 Ontario elections.

After Ontario Liberal Leader Bonnie Crombie received 57% approval in her mandatory leadership review, Blais and Ajax MPP Rob Cerjanec threatened to leave the party and sit as independents unless she resigned. Crombie later resigned.

== Personal life ==
Blais and his wife Marta have one son. They live in the Chaperal neighbourhood.

On January 7, 2013, while working out at a local gym, Blais suffered a heart attack. He was initially treated at Montfort Hospital before being transferred to the University of Ottawa Heart Institute. Blais spent four months in hospital recovering.

== Election results ==
=== Provincial ===
2025 Ontario general election: Orléans
Party	Candidate	Votes	%	±%
Liberal	Stephen Blais	30,482	54.18	+7.92
Progressive Conservative	Stéphan Plourde	19,868	35.31	+2.66
New Democratic	Matthew Sévigny	3,378	6.00	–7.79
Green	Michelle Petersen	1,398	2.48	–2.07
New Blue	Patricia Hooper	636	1.13	–0.41
Libertarian	Ken Lewis	233	0.41	+0.06
Independent	Arabella Vida	138	0.25	–
Independent	Burthomley Douzable	129	0.23	–
Total valid votes		56,262	99.39	
Total rejected, unmarked and declined ballots		347	0.61	+0.26
Turnout		56,609	47.70	+1.11
Eligible voters		118,683		
Liberal hold		Swing		+2.63
Source: Elections Ontario

2022 Ontario general election: Orléans
Party	Candidate	Votes	%	±%	Expenditures
Liberal	Stephen Blais	23,982	46.26	–9.82	$96,104
Progressive Conservative	Melissa Felián	16,926	32.65	+9.34	$76,495
New Democratic	Gabe Bourdon	7,150	13.79	–1.45	$13,851
Green	Michelle Petersen	2,359	4.55	+0.36	$6,196
New Blue	Liam Randall	796	1.54	–	$7,734
Ontario Party	Vince Clements	442	0.85	–	$0
Libertarian	Ken Lewis	184	0.35	–0.19	$0
Total valid votes/expense limit		51,839	99.64	–	$156,324
Total rejected, unmarked and declined ballots		185	0.36	+0.05	
Turnout		52,024	46.59	+23.51	
Eligible voters		111,660			
Liberal hold		Swing		–9.58	
Source: Elections Ontario

Ontario provincial by-election, February 27, 2020: Orléans Resignation of Marie-France Lalonde to run federally
Party	Candidate	Votes	%	±%
Liberal	Stephen Blais	14,302	56.08	+17.03
Progressive Conservative	Natalie Montgomery	5,945	23.31	–11.89
New Democratic	Manon Parrot	3,888	15.25	–6.70
Green	Andrew West	1,069	4.19	+1.69
Libertarian	Jean-Serge Brisson	138	0.54	–0.08
None of the Above	Keegan Bennett	100	0.39	–
Pauper	John Turmel	32	0.13	–
Ontario Alliance	Gerrie Huenemoerder	28	0.11	–
Total valid votes		25,502	99.69	
Total rejected, unmarked and declined ballots		79	0.31	–0.60
Turnout		25,581	23.09	–39.68
Eligible voters		110,811		
Liberal hold		Swing		+14.46
Source: Elections Ontario

=== Municipal ===
Ward 19 - Cumberland (2018)
Candidate	Votes	%
Stephen Blais (X)	11,230	89.08%
Cameron Rose Jette	741	5.88%
Jensen Boire	636	5.04%

Ward 19 - Cumberland (2014)
Candidate	Votes	%
Stephen Blais (X)	9,446	78.03%
Marc Belisle	2,659	21.96%

Ward 19 - Cumberland (2010)
Candidate	Votes	%
Stephen Blais	6,358	52.36%
Rob Jellett (X)	5,282	43.49%
Patrick Paquette	504	4.15%

=== School Board ===
Zone 3 (Wards 1, 19) (2006)
Candidate	Votes	%
Stephen Blais	3,124	55.30%
Des Curley (X)	2,525	44.70%
