= Orléans South-Navan Ward =

Orléans South-Navan
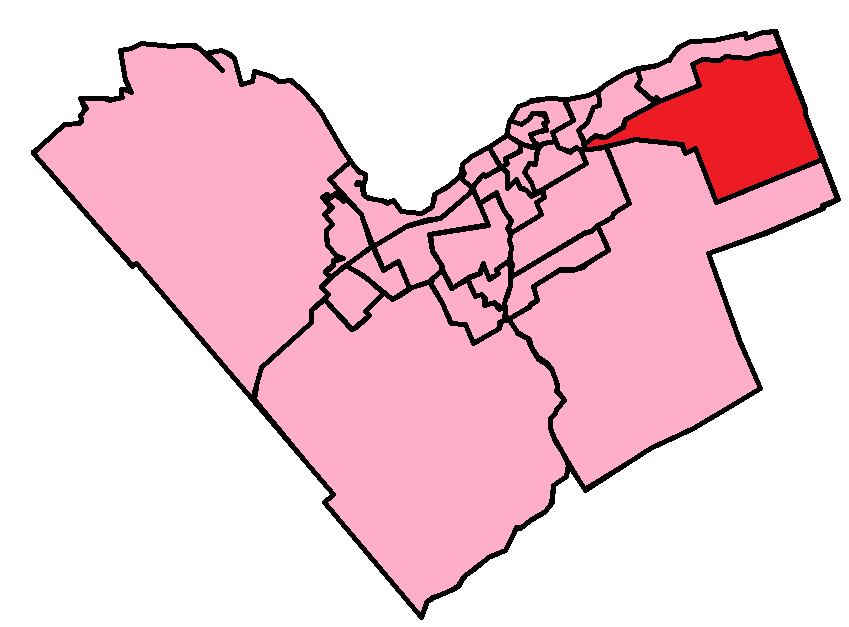
- Location within Ottawa
- Coordinates: 45°28′N 75°21′W
- Country: Canada
- Province: Ontario
- City: Ottawa

Government
  - Councillor: Catherine Kitts

Population (2022)
  - Total: 47,534

Languages (2016)
  - English: 49.1%
  - French: 37.7%
  - Arabic: 3.1%
  - Creoles: 1.0%

Orléans South-Navan Ward (Ward 19) is a city ward in Ottawa, Ontario represented on Ottawa City Council. It is located in the east end of the city, encompassing the southern portion of the Orleans subdivision and surrounding rural areas.

The ward contains the neighbourhoods of Chapel Hill South, Bradley Estates, Trailsedge, Chaperal, Avalon, Notting Gate, Notre-Dame-des-Champs, Navan, French Hill, Sarsfield, Leonard, Bearbrook, Vars, Carlsbad Springs and Canaan.

== History ==
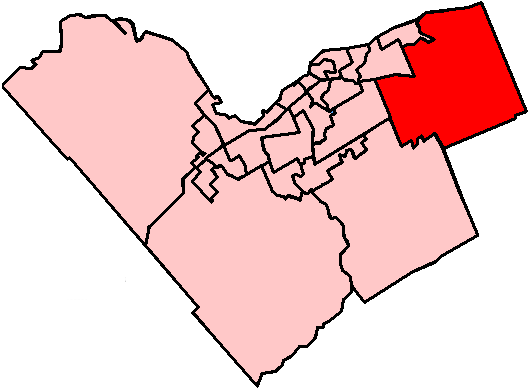
Location of Cumberland Ward (2006–2022)

The ward was created following Cumberland's amalgamation into Ottawa in 2001, but was first contested in 2000. It was named Cumberland Ward until 2022. From 2006 until 2022, the ward contained the Orleans communities of Queenswood Heights, Mer Bleue, Avalon, Chaperal, Notting Hill, Fallingbrook, Navan as well as the rural areas of the former city of Cumberland and the village as well as the former villages of Sarsfield, Notre-Dame-des-Champs, Carlsbad Springs, Vars and Bearbrook.

== Regional councillors ==
1. Wilfred Murray (1969–1972, Cumberland reeve)
2. Henri Rocque (1972–1980, Cumberland reeve)
3. Peter D. Clark (1980–1989, Cumberland mayor)
4. Brian Coburn (1989–1995, Cumberland mayor)
5. Robert van den Ham (1995–2000, Cumberland-Osgoode Ward)

== City councillors ==
Prior to amalgamation, Cumberland Ward covered Bilberry and Heritage Wards on Cumberland City Council.

1. Phil McNeely (2001–2003)
2. Rob Jellett (2003–2010)
3. Stephen Blais (2010–2020)
4. Catherine Kitts (2020–present)

== Election results ==
=== 1969 Ottawa-Carleton Regional Municipality elections ===
Reeve of Cumberland
Candidate	Votes	%
Wilfred Murray	1,500	67.14
Edgar Wall	734	32.86

=== 1972 Ottawa-Carleton Regional Municipality elections ===
Reeve of Cumberland
Candidate	Votes	%
Henri Rocque	2,072	62.33
Adrian Hayes	1,252	37.67

=== 1974 Ottawa-Carleton Regional Municipality elections ===
Reeve of Cumberland
Candidate	Votes	%
Henri Rocque	1,874	63.78
Ed Grimm	1,064	36.22

=== 1976 Ottawa-Carleton Regional Municipality elections ===
Reeve of Cumberland
Candidate	Votes	%
Henri Rocque	1,203	35.19
Adrian Hayes	1,032	30.18
Arthur Jackson	1,011	29.57
Dennis Staff	173	5.06

=== 1978 Ottawa-Carleton Regional Municipality elections ===
Reeve of Cumberland
Candidate	Votes	%
Henri Rocque	Acclaimed	

=== 1980 Ottawa-Carleton Regional Municipality elections ===
Reeve of Cumberland
Candidate	Votes	%
Peter D. Clark	2,119	51.71
Henri Rocque	1,979	48.29

=== 1982 Ottawa-Carleton Regional Municipality elections ===
Candidate	Vote	%
Peter D. Clark (X)	3,939	62.68
Henri Rocque	2,345	37.32

=== 1985 Ottawa-Carleton Regional Municipality elections ===
Mayor of Cumberland
Candidate	Votes	%
Peter D. Clark	4,183	80.94
Michael Slade	985	19.06

=== 1988 Ottawa-Carleton Regional Municipality elections ===
Mayor of Cumberland
Candidate	Votes	%
Peter D. Clark	Acclaimed	

=== 1991 Ottawa-Carleton Regional Municipality elections ===
Mayor of Cumberland
Candidate	Votes	%
Brian Coburn	7,933	64.83
Bob Monette	4,304	35.17

=== 1994 Ottawa-Carleton Regional Municipality elections ===
- As Cumberland-Osgoode ward

Regional council
Candidate	Votes	%
Robert van den Ham	Acclaimed	

=== 1997 Ottawa-Carleton Regional Municipality elections ===
- As Cumberland-Osgoode ward

Regional council
Candidate	Votes	%
Robert van den Ham	4216	51.88
John Cyr	2939	36.16
John Geary	580	7.14
Daniel Bood	392	4.82

=== 2000 Ottawa municipal election ===
Engineer Phil McNeely defeated regional councillor Robert van den Ham and Cumberland City Councillor David Lewis (Bilberry Ward).

City council
Candidate	Votes	%
Phil McNeely	3,814	44.55
Robert van den Ham	1,866	21.80
David Lewis	1,631	19.05
Judy Poulin	1,250	14.60

=== 2003 Ottawa municipal election ===
Cumberland Ward
Candidate	Votes	%
Rob Jellett	2,957	54.37
Garry Lowe	1,871	34.40
Pierre E. Doucette	552	10.15
David Whissell	59	1.08

=== 2006 Ottawa municipal election ===
City council
Candidate	Votes	%
Rob Jellett	8306	71.55
Henry Valois	2110	18.18
Dan Biocchi	1192	10.27

Ottawa Mayor (Ward results)
Candidate	Votes	%
Larry O'Brien	5,995	50.36
Alex Munter	4,223	35.47
Bob Chiarelli	1,567	13.16
Jane Scharf	56	0.47
Robert Larter	24	0.20
Barkley Pollock	23	0.19
Piotr Anweiler	17	0.14

=== 2010 Ottawa municipal election ===
City council
Candidate	Votes	%
Stephen Blais	6358	52.36
Rob Jellett	5282	43.49
Patrick Paquette	504	4.15

Ottawa Mayor (Ward results)
Candidate	Votes	%
Jim Watson	6,371	52.29
Larry O'Brien	3,203	26.29
Clive Doucet	1,282	10.52
Andrew S. Haydon	634	5.20
Mike Maguire	296	2.43
Robert G. Gauthier	135	1.11
Jane Scharf	53	0.43
Charlie Taylor	40	0.33
Cesar Bello	39	0.32
Idris Ben-Tahir	32	0.26
Sean Ryan	25	0.21
Samuel Wright	12	0.10
Joseph Furtenbacher	12	0.10
Daniel J. Lyrette	11	0.09
Robert Larter	8	0.07
Robin Lawrance	8	0.07
Michael St. Arnaud	7	0.06
Julio Pita	6	0.05
Vincent Libweshya	5	0.04
Fraser Liscumb	5	0.04

=== 2014 Ottawa municipal election ===
City council
Candidate	Vote	%
Stephen Blais	9,446	78.03
Marc Belisle	2,659	21.97

Ottawa mayor (Ward results)
Candidate	Vote	%
Jim Watson	8,845	78.70
Mike Maguire	1,773	15.78
Michael St. Arnaud	127	1.13
Anwar Syed	124	1.10
Robert White	110	0.98
Rebecca Pyrah	100	0.89
Darren W. Wood	96	0.85
Bernard Couchman	64	0.57

=== 2018 Ottawa municipal election ===
City council
Candidate	Vote	%
Stephen Blais	11,230	89.08
Cameron Rose Jette	741	5.88
Jensen Boire	636	5.04

Ottawa mayor (Ward results)
Candidate	Vote	%
Jim Watson	8,916	79.69
Clive Doucet	1,538	13.75
Bruce McConville	164	1.47
Joey Drouin	120	1.07
Hamid Alakozai	87	0.78
Ahmed Bouragba	85	0.76
Craig MacAulay	73	0.65
Michael Pastien	49	0.44
James T. Sheahan	49	0.44
Bernard Couchman	41	0.37
Moises Schachtler	35	0.31
Ryan Lythall	32	0.29

=== 2020 by-election ===
There was a by-election held on 5 October 2020, to replace Blais who had been elected to the Legislative Assembly of Ontario earlier in the year.

Candidates

- Yvette Ashiri - Hosts the television show Identité Cultur'Elles, is executive vice-president of Junior Chamber International Canada, chairs the École Élémentaire Publique des Sentiers council, sits on the governance committee of the Montfort Hospital, one of the lead organizers of the "No Justice No Peace" march. Endorsed by Kitchissippi Ward Councillor Jeff Leiper, Capital Ward Councillor, Shawn Menard, NDP MPP Joel Harden and Horizon Ottawa.
- Jensen Boire - Ran in this ward in the 2018 municipal election.
- A. Bruce Faulkner - ran for the Libertarian Party of Ontario in Ottawa Centre in the 2018 Ontario general election. Also ran in the 2014 municipal election in Kanata South Ward and in the 2019 Rideau-Rockcliffe Ward by-election.
- Lyse-Pascale Inamuco - Director of Community Service for the Rotary Club of Orléans, co-chair and former co-vice chair for Women's March Ottawa, Director at 613-819 Black Hub Noir. A former staffer for Liberal MPP Nathalie Des Rosiers. Endorsed by Des Rosiers and Liberal MP Greg Fergus, and Dr. Betsy McGregor.
- Catherine Kitts - Former editor of the Orleans Star newspaper. As of 2016, Communications Officer at Carleton University. Member of Equal Voice. Came second out of 17 candidates in Orleans Ward in the 2018 municipal election. Now lives in Navan. Endorsed by Orleans Ward city councillor Matthew Luloff, Liberal MP Marie-France Lalonde, Liberal MPP Stephen Blais and former Liberal MPPs Madeleine Meilleur and Phil McNeely.
- Denis Labrèche - President of the Carlsbad Springs Community Association.
- Craig MacAulay - Ran for mayor in the 2018 municipal election.
- Gina Mertikas-Lavictoire - Cancer fundraiser.
- Mark Scharfe - Ran in Osgoode Ward for city council in the 2014 and 2018 elections.
- Patrick Uguccioni - Former Corporate Communication Strategist at the City of Ottawa. Managing editor of the Your Community Voice community newspapers. Endorsed by former mayors Larry O'Brien and Bob Chiarelli, former Progressive Conservative MPP Brian Coburn and former city councillor Doug Thompson.
- Henry Valois - Ran in this ward in the 2006 municipal election.

Results

City council
Candidate	Vote	%
Catherine Kitts	4,736	54.44
Yvette Ashiri	1,907	21.92
Lyse-Pascale Inamuco	789	9.07
Henry Valois	484	5.56
Patrick Uguccioni	373	4.30
Denis Labrèche	239	2.75
Mark Scharfe	103	1.18
A. Bruce Faulkner	33	0.38
Craig MacAulay	18	0.21
Jensen Boire	16	0.18

=== 2022 Ottawa municipal election ===
City council
Candidate	Vote	%
Catherine Kitts	9,466	76.47
Yvette Ashiri	2,716	21.94
Shamsa Sheikh Ahmed	196	1.58

=== 2026 Ottawa municipal election ===
2026 Ottawa municipal election: Orléans South-Navan
Candidate	Popular vote			Expenditures
Candidate	Votes	%	±%	Expenditures
Catherine Kitts (X)	12,074	90.17		
Jason Wing	1,317	9.83		
Total valid votes	13,590			
Total rejected, unmarked and declined votes				
Turnout		30.84		
Eligible voters	44,073			
Note: Candidate campaign colours are based on the prominent colour used in campaign items (signs, literature, etc.) and are used as a visual differentiation between candidates.
