= Tamarack Developments Corporation =

Tamarack Development Corporation (Tamarack Homes) is a firm that was started in 1987 and is a subsidiary of Taggart Group of Companies in the Ottawa-Carleton region.

== History ==
Tamarack Development Corporation was started in 1987 as a subsidiary of Taggart Group of Companies.

In 2005, Tamarack joined Tartan Homes to build Jackson Trails in Stittsville, Ontario, Canada, which was Canada's first community of Energy Star homes. In 2014 the two builders launched their latest joint project at Poole Creek Village in Ottawa's west end. The builder launched its first solo condo project in 2014, in Hintonburg, a neighbourhood of Ottawa. In 2012, Tamarack became a title sponsor of Ottawa Race Weekend in Ottawa, Ontario, Canada.

In February 2003 the company was fined $150,000 after pleading guilty to failures under the Ontario Occupational Health and Safety Act, where a surveyor was killed by heavy equipment on a construction site in Ottawa.

== Current projects ==
Tamarack currently has 14 completed or ongoing projects, as well as 3 in the pre-construction phase, in the Ottawa-Carleton region.

- Cardinal Creek Village, where several purchasers said their buildings were not up to code
- Central Condominiums
- Chaperal
- Findlay Creek Village
- Half Moon Bay
- Jackson Trails
- Mondrian Condominiums
- The Meadows
- Poole Creek Village
- Smart House
- Wellington
