= Rob Jellett =

Canadian politician

Robert Jellett (born c. 1960) is a former Ottawa City Councillor. He represented the large Cumberland Ward, located at the city's eastern edge from 2003 to 2010.

== Biography ==
Jellett worked as a reporter, news anchor and Assistant News Director with local radio stations CFMO and CFRA for eighteen years. He then became the assistant to Cumberland councillor Phil McNeely in 2000. When McNeely was elected to the provincial legislature Jellet ran to replace him in the 2003 Ottawa election. Running against Garry Lowe the main issue was the construction of an industrial hog farm in the village of Sarsfield. Jellett was strongly opposed while Lowe supported the idea. Jellett ended up winning by a substantial margin, however a court later ruled the city could not stop the project. Jellett, who describes himself as a Red Tory, was also forced to abandon his pledge not to raise taxes due to the difficulties surrounding the 2004 budget. Jellett served as the Chair of the city's Agriculture and Rural Affairs Committee and sat on eight other city committee's and advisory boards.

== Election results ==
=== Ottawa municipal election, 2003 ===
Cumberland Ward (Ward 19)
Candidate	Votes	%
Rob Jellett	2957	54.37%
Garry Lowe	1871	34.40%
Pierre E. Doucette	552	10.15%
David Whissell	59	1.08%

=== Ottawa municipal election, 2006 ===
Cumberland Ward (Ward 19)
Candidate	Votes	%
Rob Jellett	8306	71.55%
Henry Valois	2110	18.18%
Dan Biocchi	1192	10.27%

Preceded by Phil McNeely	City councillors from Cumberland Ward; 2003-2010	Succeeded by Stephen Blais
