= Chaperal =

- Community
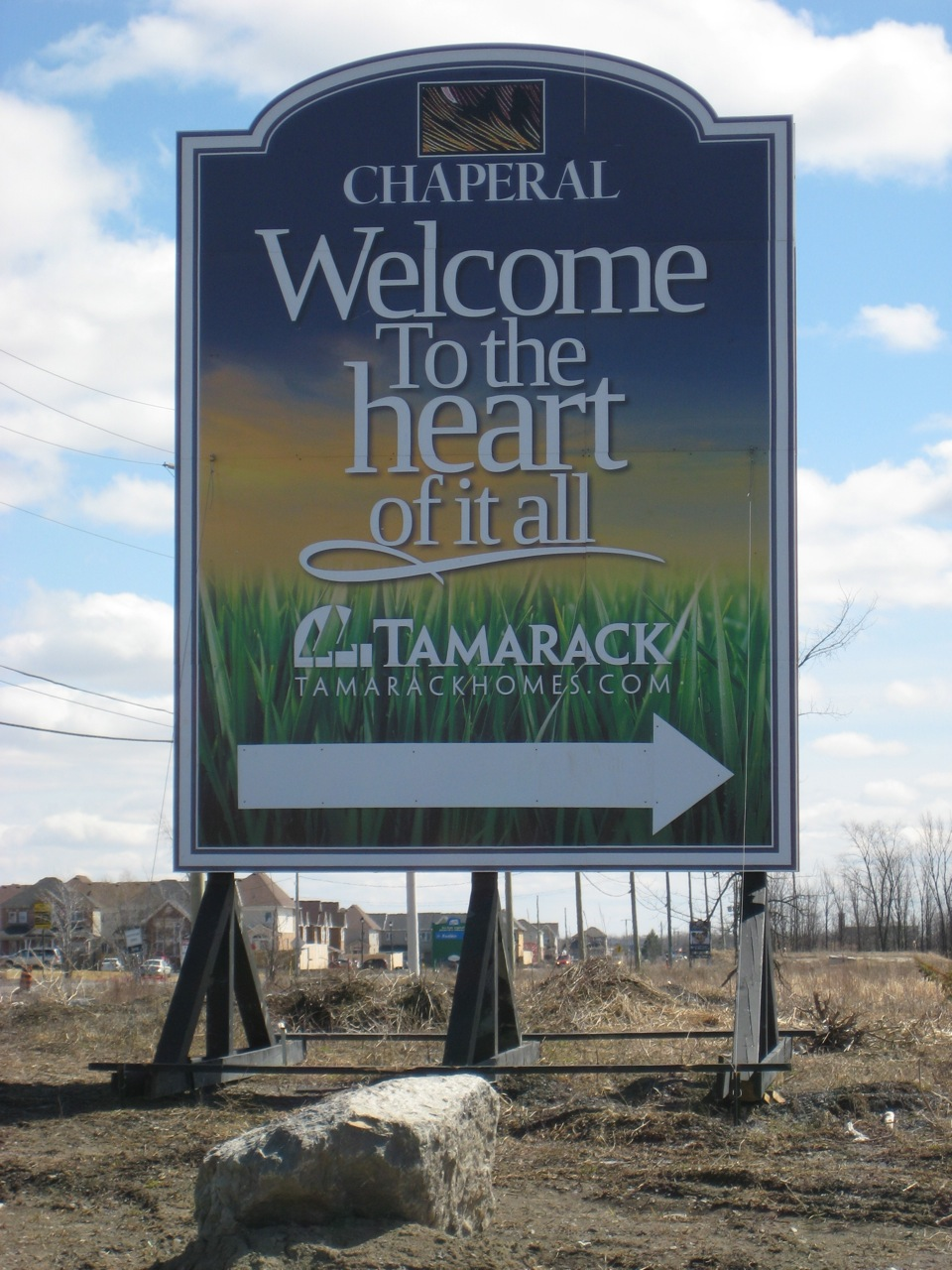
- Chaperal Community
- Motto: "Welcome to the heart of it all"
- Interactive map of Chaperal
- Coordinates: 45°27′7″N 75°29′16″W
- Country: Canada
- Province: Ontario
- City: Ottawa
- Ward: Cumberland Ward
- Established: Spring 2008

Population (2011)
  - Total: 766
- Time zone: UTC-5 (Eastern (EST))
  - Summer (DST): UTC-4 (EDT)
- Postal Code: K4A 0M3-0M7
- Area codes: 613, 343 (May 2010)
- Website: http://tamarackhomes.com/chaperal-community-home.html

Chaperal is a neighbourhood located in the suburban Orleans area, in the east-end of the city of Ottawa, Ontario.

Part of the city's Cumberland Ward, the residential development is bordered to the north by Innes Road, to the west by Mer Bleue Road, the east by Tenth Line Road and to the south by Brian Coburn Boulevard. The community includes a mixture of single family, semi-detached, town homes, and bungalows. Tamarack commenced the first phase of construction in Spring 2008. As of the Canada 2011 Census, the population was 766.

Past OC Transpo plans saw a potential O-Train light train line to the area; however, some controversy and the December 14, 2006 cancellation of a previous proposal halted the plans.

Taggart Realty Management were responsible for the commercial development of the Shops of Tenth Line, located at the corner of Tenth Line Road and Brian Coburn Boulevard.

== See also ==
- List of Ottawa neighbourhoods
