= Orleans, Ontario =

Suburb of Ottawa, Ontario, Canada

Orleans Orléans (French)
- Community
- Orléans
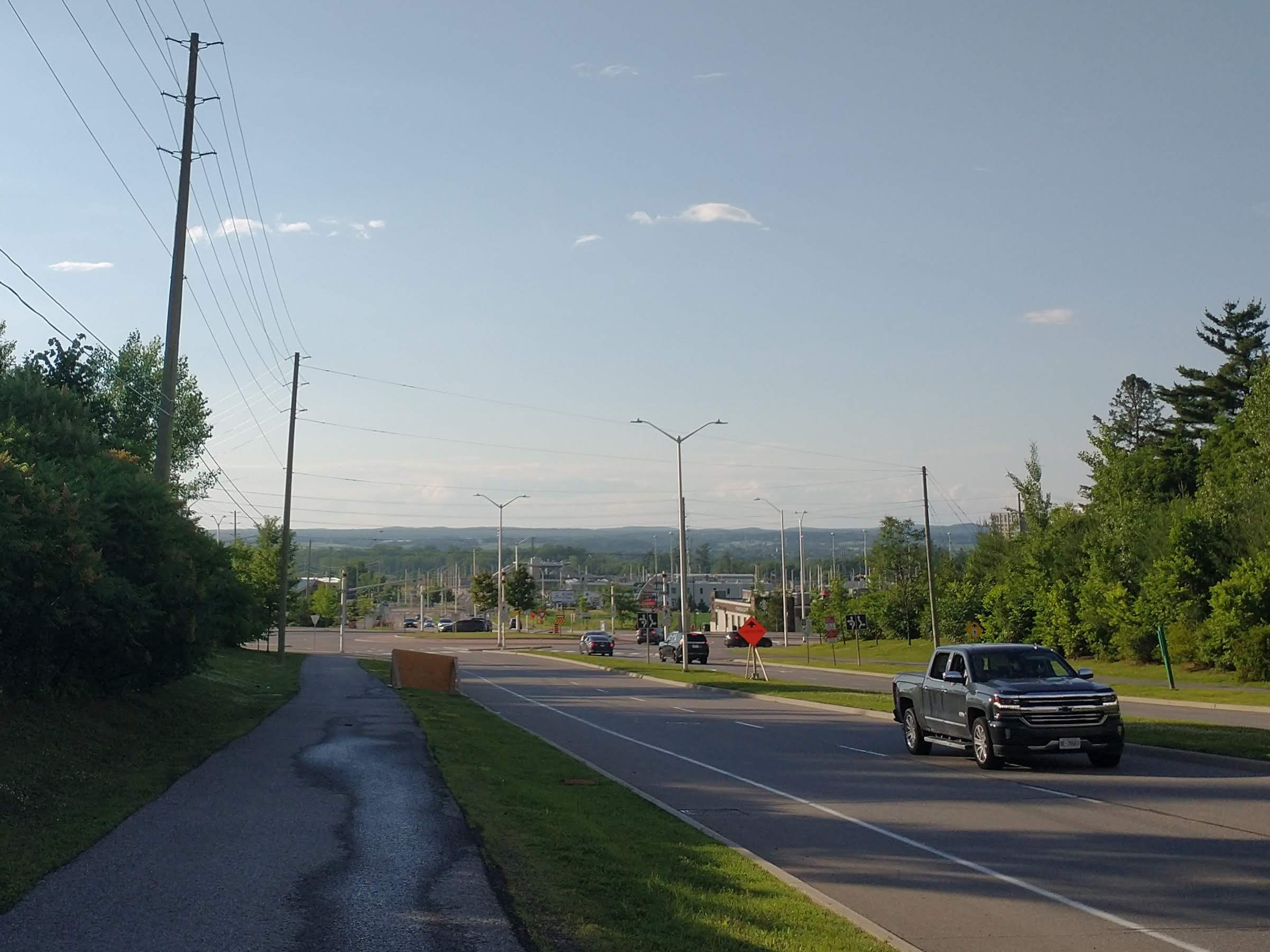
- Trim Road overlooking The Ottawa River

- Location in Ottawa
- Coordinates: 45°28′N 75°31′W
- Country: Canada
- Province: Ontario
- City: Ottawa
- Parish of St-Joseph d'Orléans: 1830s
- Police Village of St-Joseph d'Orléans: 1922
- Community of Orléans: 1974
- City of Ottawa: 2001

Government
  - City councillors: Catherine Kitts, Laura Dudas, Matthew Luloff
  - Member of Parliament: Marie-France Lalonde
  - Member of Provincial Parliament: Stephen Blais

Population (2021)
  - Total: 125,937
- Time zone: UTC−5 (Eastern (EST))
  - Summer (DST): UTC−4 (EDT)
- Postal codes: K4A, K1E
- Area codes: 613, 343

Orleans (/ɔːrˈliːnz/; French: [ɔʁleɑ̃]; officially and in French Orléans) (Note: The suburb is called Orléans (with an accent) in French, and is commonly called Orleans (no accent) in English. The official name in English was changed from Orleans to Orléans by the Ontario Geographic Names Board in 1994 but the unaccented form remains in common usage.) is a satellite suburban community in the east end of Ottawa, Ontario, Canada, located along the Ottawa River about 16 km (10 mi) from Downtown Ottawa.

Based on the adjusted boundary definition used for Orléans, the community had a population of 139,309 in the 2021 Canadian Census.

Originally settled in the 1830s by predominantly French Canadian families and centred on the parish of St. Joseph d'Orléans, it developed as one of the National Capital Region's principal Francophone communities before undergoing rapid suburban growth during the late 20th century.

Before being amalgamated into Ottawa in 2001, Orléans was divided between two municipalities, the City of Cumberland, and the City of Gloucester. Today, Orléans spans the municipal wards of Orléans East-Cumberland, Orléans West-Innes, and Orléans South-Navan. Orléans is one of Ottawa's largest suburban communities and serves as a major residential and commercial centre in the city's east end. The community is home to major commercial districts, recreational destinations including Petrie Island, and a range of English and French language educational, cultural, and community institutions that reflect its bilingual character and historical Francophone heritage.

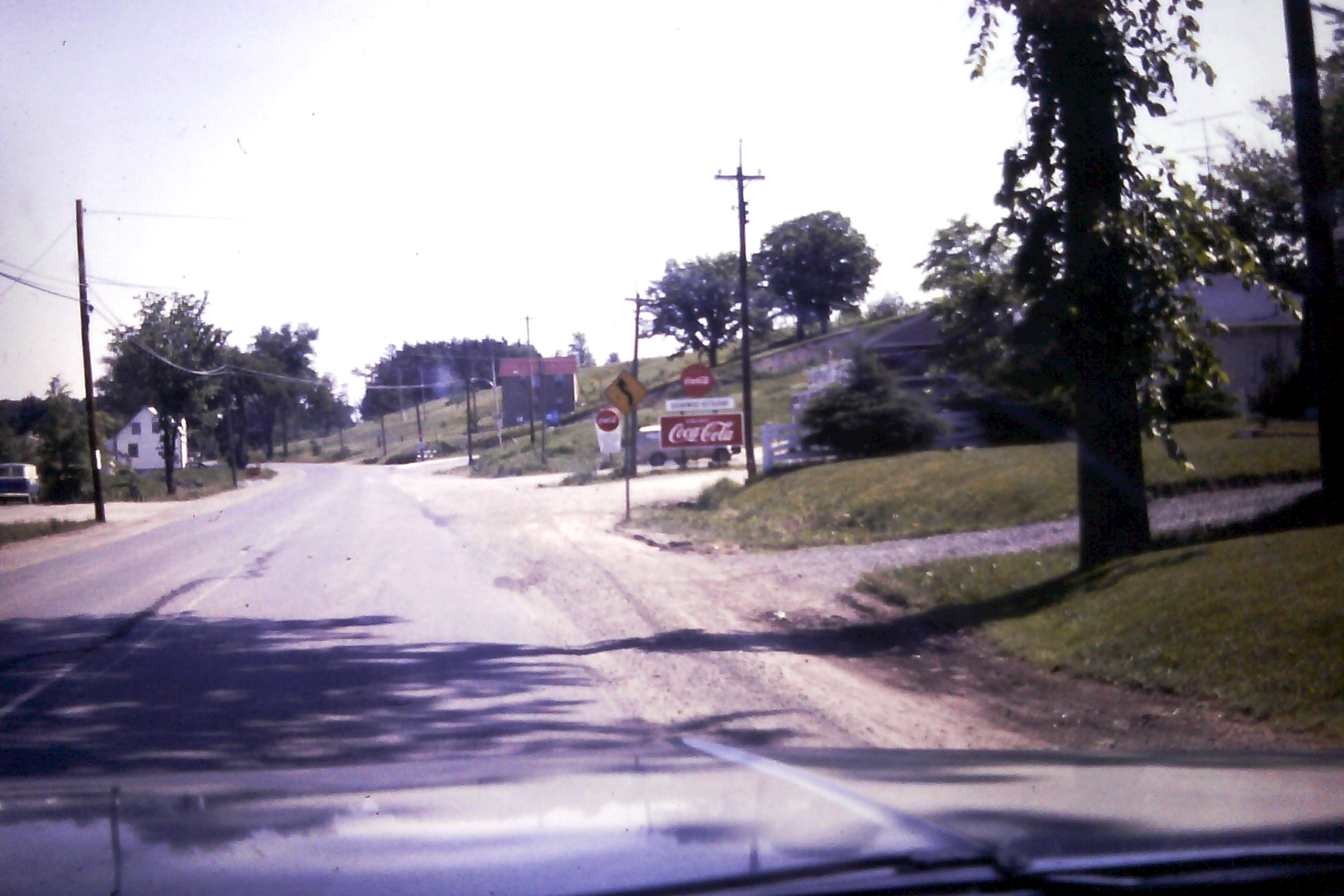
St-Joseph Blvd. circa 1971.

== History ==
=== Indigenous History ===
The Ottawa River corridor has supported human activity for thousands of years and contains archaeological evidence of prehistoric occupation, including sites associated with fishing, hunting, and seasonal camps. The river and surrounding wetlands provided important resources and transportation routes for Indigenous communities throughout the Ottawa Valley. Archaeological research in the region indicates that early inhabitants used waterways for travel and resource harvesting.

Before European contact, Indigenous peoples in the Ottawa Valley participated in extensive trade networks connected by the Ottawa River. By the early 17th century, the river had become a major travel route for Indigenous communities and later European explorers, missionaries and fur traders. Indigenous peoples played a central role in the fur trade, harvesting and trading beaver and other furs with French traders who travelled along the Ottawa River into the interior of North America.

The growth of the fur trade during the 17th and 18th centuries shaped the development of the Ottawa River Valley, influencing patterns of transportation, settlement, and economic activity. Indigenous knowledge of the river system and its resources was essential to European exploration and trade. Although European settlement expanded throughout the region during the 19th century, Indigenous peoples continued to maintain connections to the Ottawa River through traditional activities such as fishing, hunting, and trapping.

=== Agricultural Era (1800s-mid 1900s) ===
European settlement in the area began during the 1830s. Among the earliest francophone families were the Dupuis, Besserer, Major, Duford, and Vezina families, while the Kenny and McNeely families were among the earliest anglophone settlers. These early farming families helped establish the rural communities that would later form present-day Orléans. The area now known as Orléans is located on the unceded traditional territory of the Algonquin Anishinaabe Nation.

In 1858, Luc Major registered the first subdivision plan for Lots 1 and 2 in Gloucester Township, Carleton County, establishing the village of St. Joseph. This marked the beginning of the area's organized development. The following year, François Dupuis registered a subdivision plan for Lot 3, laying out St. John (now St-Jean), Dupuis (now Dessere), and Scott (now St-Charles) streets. Scott Street was named in honour of his wife, Mary Scott.

By 1880, Orléans had grown to 174 families, including 131 francophone families and 43 anglophone families, reflecting the area's predominantly French speaking character. Following early settlement in the Orléans area, these families cleared land for agriculture and established farms that supported local communities. Farming was primarily based on mixed agriculture, with families growing crops and raising livestock while also relying on the Ottawa River for seasonal fishing and other resources. During the 19th century and early 20th centuries, agriculture became a defining feature of the area, with farms producing crops such as potatoes, turnips, and other market produce that were sold in nearby communities, including Ottawa's Byward Market.

Several large agricultural properties contributed to the development of the community. The Duford family operated a large farm along what is now St. Joseph Boulevard, producing agricultural goods and dairy products. In 1917, the Oblate Fathers established Ferme St. Joseph, an agricultural property that later became known as the Orléans Fruit Farm. The farm supplied food products to institutions in Ottawa, such as the University of Ottawa and Saint Paul Seminary. The agricultural heritage of Orléans is also reflected in surviving structures such as the Vinette Silo, built in 1945 by local farmers and recognized as a reminder of the area's rural past.

=== Suburban Transformation (1960s-2001) ===
Beginning in the late 1960s, Orléans underwent a major transformation from a rural agricultural community into a suburban area of Ottawa. The construction of Queenswood Heights marked one of the first large scale residential developments in the community, beginning a period of rapid suburban growth. Expansion accelerated during the 1970s following improvements to Highway 174, which increased access between Orléans and central Ottawa. The population grew significantly during this period, increasing from approximately 6,000 residents to in 1971 to about 24,000 by 1981. New residential neighbourhoods, including Convent Glen and Orléans Woods, were developed as farmland and were converted into suburban housing.

During the 1980s and 1990s, suburban development continued southward and eastward with the creation of communities such as Chapel Hill and Fallingbrook. These neighbourhoods were characterized by low density residential development, including single family homes, parks, schools, and community facilities. The availability of housing and proximity to employment opportunities in Ottawa contributed to continued population growth.

As the population expanded, Orléans developed its own commercial and community infrastructure. St. Joseph Boulevard, historically the area's main road, evolved into a major commercial corridor with local businesses and services. The opening of Place D'Orléans in 1979 established a major shopping centre that became an important commercial destination for the growing suburb. At the same time, Orléans retained its strong Francophone heritage while becoming increasingly bilingual and culturally diverse as new residents moved into the community.

For most of the 20th century, Orléans developed as a suburban community divided between the former municipalities of Gloucester and Cumberland.

=== Post Amalgamation ===
Following the amalgamation of the Regional Municipality of Ottawa-Carleton in 2001, both municipalities became part of the new City of Ottawa, bringing all of Orléans under a single municipal government. Today, Orléans spans the municipal wards of Orléans East–Cumberland, Orléans West–Innes, and Orléans South–Navan. What was once a small rural community, has become a major suburban district of Ottawa.

== Geography ==
=== Location and Boundaries ===
Orléans is located in the eastern part of Ottawa, Ontario, along the Ottawa River and east of the city's urban core. The community is generally bounded by the Ottawa River to the north, Green's Creek and the former Gloucester boundary to the west, rural areas of Cumberland and Navan to the east, and rural lands south of Innes Road and Renaud Road. The area extends from Highway 174 in the north to the suburban and rural areas of Innes Road, including communities around Avalon, Chapel Hill South and Bradley Estates.

=== Natural Features ===
Ottawa River: The Ottawa River forms the northern boundary of Orléans and is one of the major waterways in eastern Canada. Its name originates from the Anishinàbemowin (Algonquin) word adàwe, meaning "to trade," reflecting the river's historical importance as a transportation and trade route for Indigenous peoples. Known in Anishinàbemowin as Kichi Sibi ("Great River"), the Ottawa River extends approximately 1,271 km (789.7 mi) from its source in Quebec to its mouth at the St. Lawrence River and drains a watershed of approximately 146,300 km^{2} (56,486.7 mi^{2}).

Green's Creek: Green's Creek is a natural corridor in eastern Ottawa that extends from the Ottawa River toward the Mer Bleue Conservation Area. The area is characterized by steep sided ravines, forested slopes, and clay based floodpaints formed from postglacial deposits of the ancient Champlain Sea. The creek valley provides habitat for a variety of plant and animal species and serves as an ecological connected between the Ottawa River and inland natural areas. The area also contains a network of multi use trails within the Greenbelt.

The Mer Bleue Conservation Area: The Mer Bleue Conservation Area is a 3,500 hectare natural area located in the southeastern part of Ottawa's Greenbelt, south of Orléans. It contains the Mer Bleue Bog, a northern style boreal wetland estimated to be approximately 7,700 years old. The bog supports a variety of plant and animal species, including several rare species, and is recognized as a wetland of international importance under the Ramsar Convention. The area is also an important site for ecological research, particularly in the study of carbon storage and greenhouse gas emissions.

The Orléans Escarpment: The Orléans Escarpment is a natural landscape feature extending from Forest Valley Drive to Trim Road along the southern side of St. Joseph Boulevard. It consists of two main linear natural corridors and forms of a distinct transition between developed areas and natural landscapes in Orléans. Portions of the Escarpment are protected as urban natural features by the City of Ottawa.

Cardinal Creek Karst: The Cardinal Creek Karst is a geological feature located in eastern Orléans along Cardinal Creek. The karst landscape contains a cave system and sinkhole features formed through the erosion of soluble bedrock. The southern portion of the site was designated by the province of Ontario as an Earth Science Area of Natural and Scientific Interest (ANSI) in 2009. The feature is part of the broader Cardinal Creek natural corridor, which includes significant valley lands, woodlands, and other natural habitats.

Topography: Orléans is located within the Ottawa Valley and features gently varying elevations across the community. The area's elevation averages approximately 253 feet (77.1 metres) above sea level, ranging from a minimum of 128 feet (39 metres) to a maximum of 410 feet (124.9 metres).

== Neighbourhoods ==
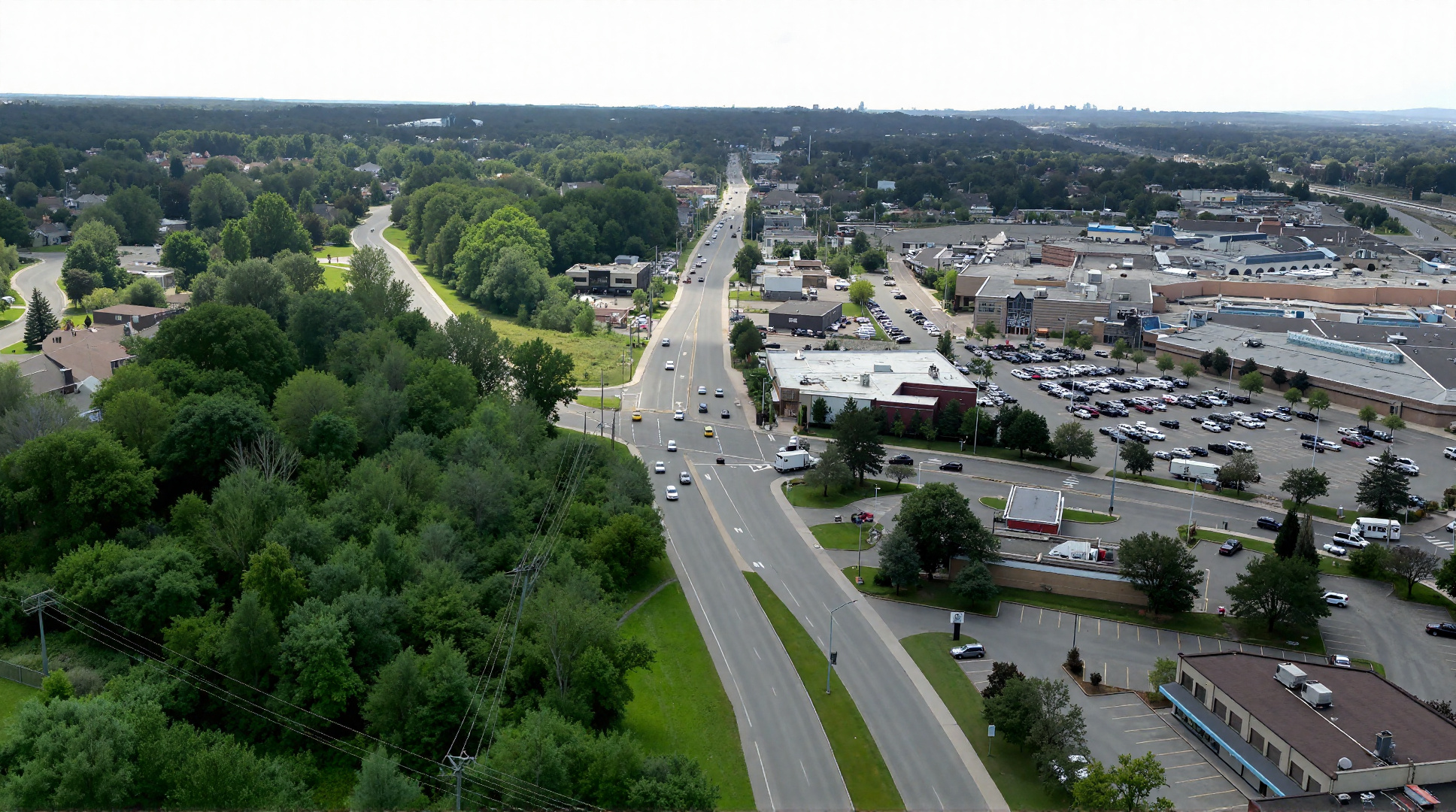
Drone streetview of Orléans

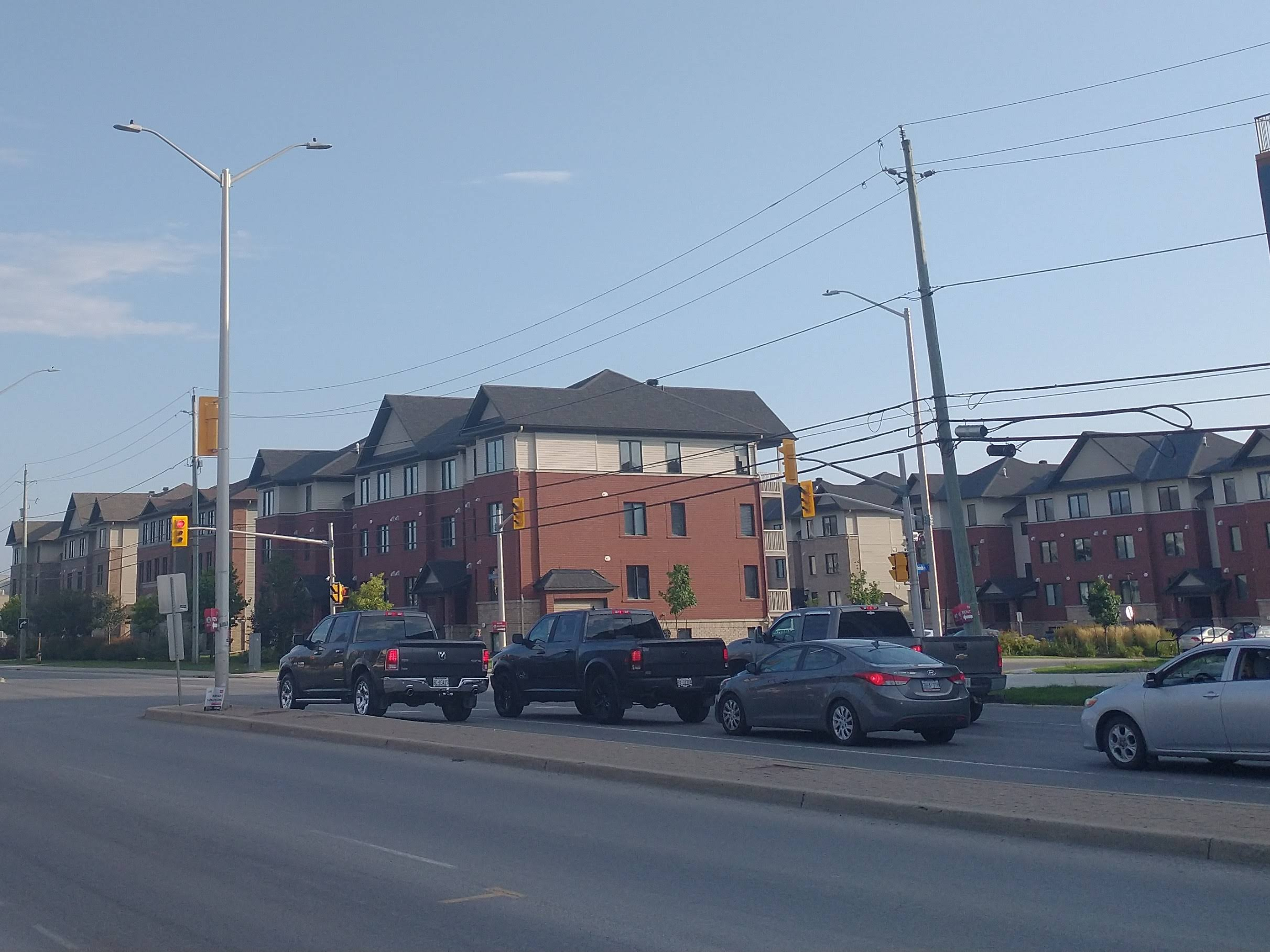
Avalon apartments on Tenth Line

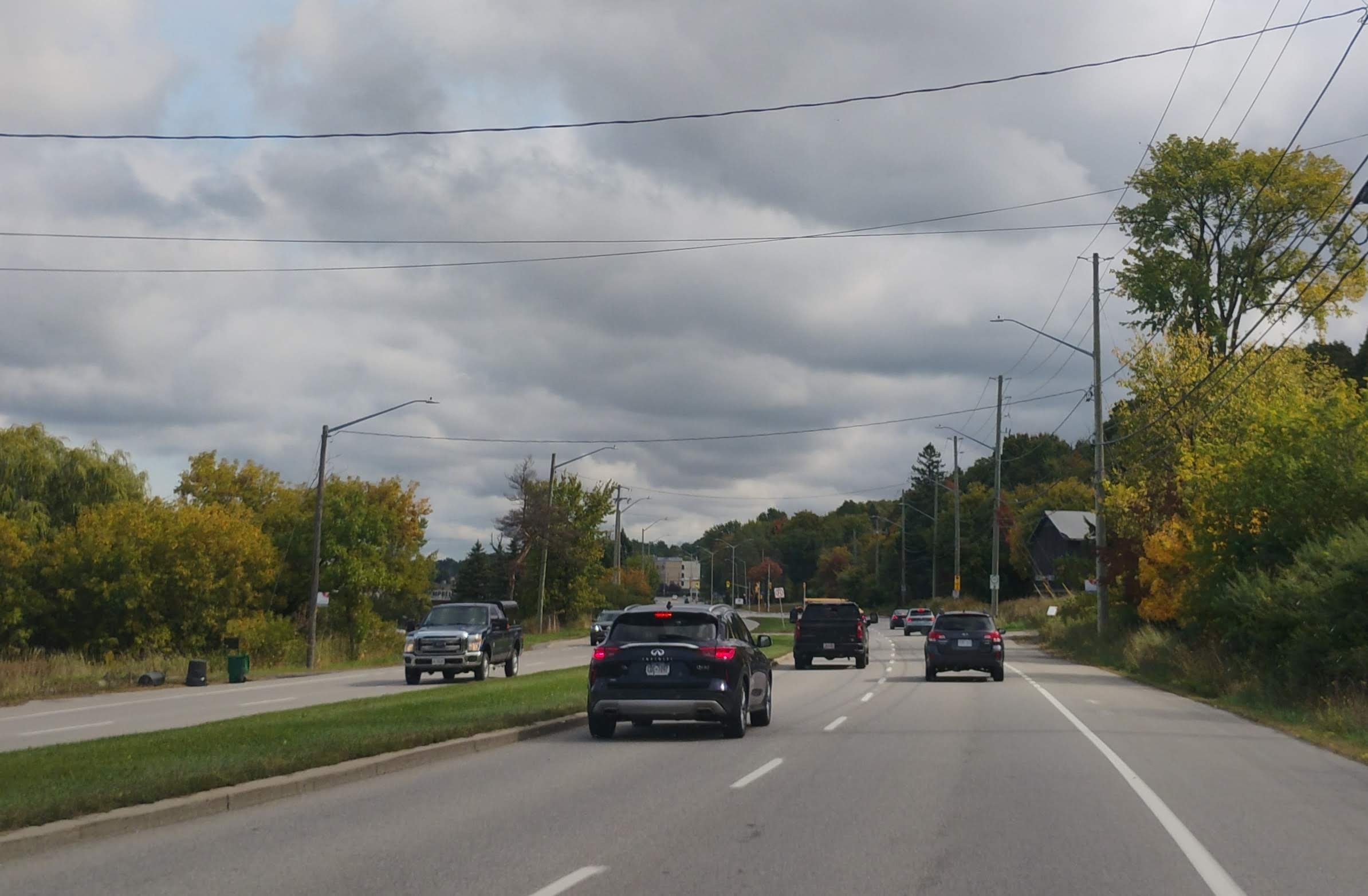
Convent Glen St Joseph Blvd by Orléans Fruit Farm

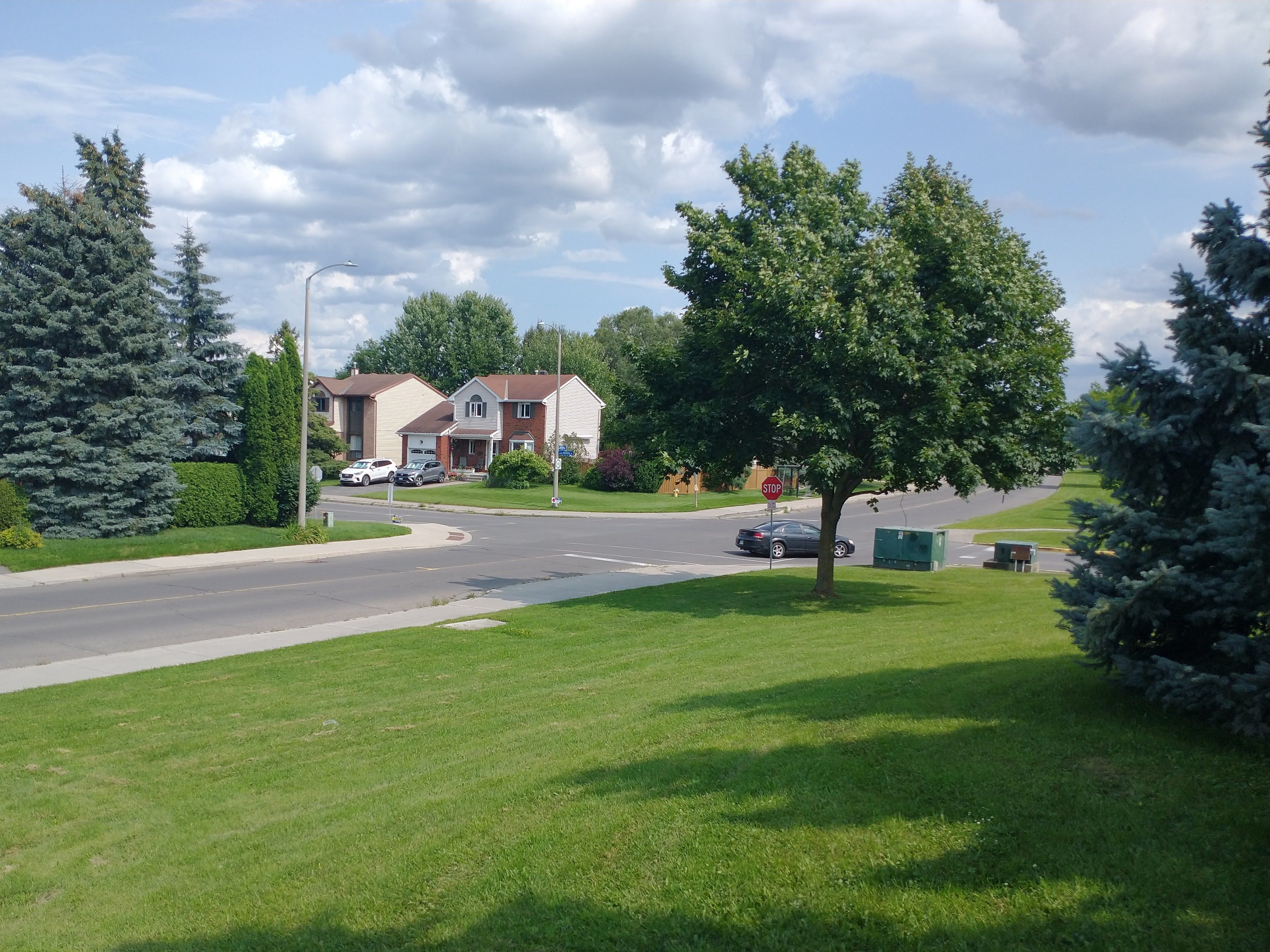
Fallingbrook Bottriell Way with Ray Friel behind

Neighbourhood	General Location
Avalon	South of Innes Road, between Mer Bleue Road and Portobello Boulevard.
Bilberry Creek	North of 174, east of Jeanne d'Arc Boulevard.
Cardinal Creek	North of Innes Road, west of Cardinal Creek.
Chapel Hill North	North of Innes Road, around Orléans Boulevard and south of St. Joseph Boulevard.
Chapel Hill South	Between Innes Road and Navan Road.
Chaperal	South of Innes Road, between Mer Bleue Road and Tenth Line Road.
Châteauneuf	Between St. Joseph Boulevard and Innes Road.
Chatelaine Village	North of Highway 174, east of Willow Avenue.
Convent Glen	North of Highway 174, west of Jeanne d'Arc Boulevard.
Convent Glen South	South of Highway 174, north of St. Joseph Boulevard.
Eastridge	Planned community near Trim Road and Brian Coburn Boulevard
Fallingbrook	Between St. Joseph Boulevard and Innes Road, west of Trim Road and east of Tenth Line Road.
Hiawatha Park	Along the Ottawa River, north of Convent Glen.
Notre-Dame-des-Champs	Near Mer Bleue Road and Navan Road.
Notting Gate	South of Innes Road, between Portobello Boulevard and Trim Road.
Orléans Village	Along St. Joseph Boulevard between Orléans Boulevard and Duford Drive.
Orléans Wood	North of Highway 174, between Jeanne d'Arc Boulevard and Champlain Street.
Orléans Central	Between Highway 174 and St. Joseph Boulevard, west of Jeanne d'Arc Boulevard and east of Tenth Line Road.
Queenswood Heights	South of St. Joseph Boulevard, west of Tenth Line Road.
Queenswood Village	North of Highway 174, between Champlain Street and Willow Avenue.
River Walk	North of Highway 174, east of Tenth Line Road.
Gardenway	North of Innes Road, between Tenth Line Road and Trim Road.
Springridge	Northeastern Orléans, north of Highway 174 and west of Trim Road.
Bradley Estates	Southwestern Orléans, between Innes Road and Renaud Road, adjacent to the Mer Bleue Conservation Area.
Trails Edge	South of Brian Coburn Boulevard, between Mer Bleue Road and Page Road.
Sunridge	North of St. Joseph Boulevard, west of Belcourt Boulevard.
Eastboro / Spring Valley Trails	South of Navan Road, between Mer Bleue Road and the NCC Greenbelt.
Pineridge	Between Princess Louise Drive and Innes Road, west of Trim Road.
Ridgemont	North of Princess Louise Drive, between Tenth Line Road and Trim Road.

== Demographics ==
=== Population Growth Over Time ===
Orléans has experienced substantial population growth over the past several decades. The community grew from approximately 6,000 residents in 1971 to around 24,000 residents in 1981. By 2011, the population had reached 107,823 residents according to the Canadian census. City of Ottawa population estimates the population at more than 130,000 residents by the mid 2020s. This long term growth has made Orléans one of Ottawa's largest suburban communities and reflects its transition from a small rural settlement into a major urban district.

Year	Population
1971	6,000 Residents
1981	24,000 Residents
2011	107,823 Residents
2025	130,390 Residents

=== General Statistics ===
According to the most recent found statistics from the 2016 Canadian Census, Orléans had a median age of 40 years and an average household size of 2.8 persons.

=== Language ===
English is the most common mother tongue in Orléans, reported by 53.5% of residents, while French was reported by 33.4%. Other commonly reported mother tongues include Arabic (3.7%) and Spanish (1.2%). Due to its significant Francophone population, Orléans is one of Ottawa's major bilingual communities.

Language	Percentage of Residents
English	53.5%
French	33.4%
Arabic	3.7%
Spanish	1.2%

=== Ethnic and cultural origins ===
Orléans has a diverse population with a mixture of longstanding European communities and more recent immigration communities. The most commonly reported ethnic and cultural origins include French (including Franco-Ontarian and Quêbécois) (34.6%), Irish (16.9%), English (15.6%), Scottish (14.2%), Canadian (13.9%), Lebanese (4.4%), and Haitian (2.9%).

Ethnicity	Percentage of Residents
French	34.6%
Irish	16.9%
English	15.6%
Scottish	14.2%
Canadian	13.9%
Lebanese	4.4%
Haitian	2.9%

Visible minorities account for 32.4% of the population, with the most frequently reported residents being Arab, black, and south Asian.

=== Immigration ===
In 2021, immigrants represented 24.5% of Orléans' population, while 74.0% of residents were non immigrants and 1.5% were non permanent residents. The largest immigrant populations by place of birth included Haiti (10.3%), Lebanon (9.5%), the United Kingdom (5.7%), the Democratic Republic of the Congo (4.2%), India (3.6%), the Philippines (3.6%), and Cameroon (2.9%).

Immigrant Populations (by place of birth)	Percentage of Residents
Haiti	10.3%
Lebanon	9.5%
the United Kingdom	5.7%
the Democratic Republic of the Congo	4.2%
India	3.6%
the Philippines	3.6%
Cameroon	2.9%

=== Religion ===
Christianity was the most common religious affiliation in Orléans, reported by 64.5% of residents. Catholicism was the largest denomination at 43.3%, followed by Anglicanism (3.3%), the United Church of Canada (2.9), Eastern Orthodoxy (2.0%), and Pentecostalism (1.5%). Other religions accounted for 11.7% of residents, while 23.6% reported no religious affiliation.

Religious Affilitation	Percentage of Residents
Christianity	64.5%
Catholocism	43.3%
Anglicanism	3.3%
the United Church of Canada	2.9%
Eastern Orthodoxy	2.0%
Pentecostalism	1.5%
No religious affiliation	23.6%
Other	11.7%

== Culture and Community ==
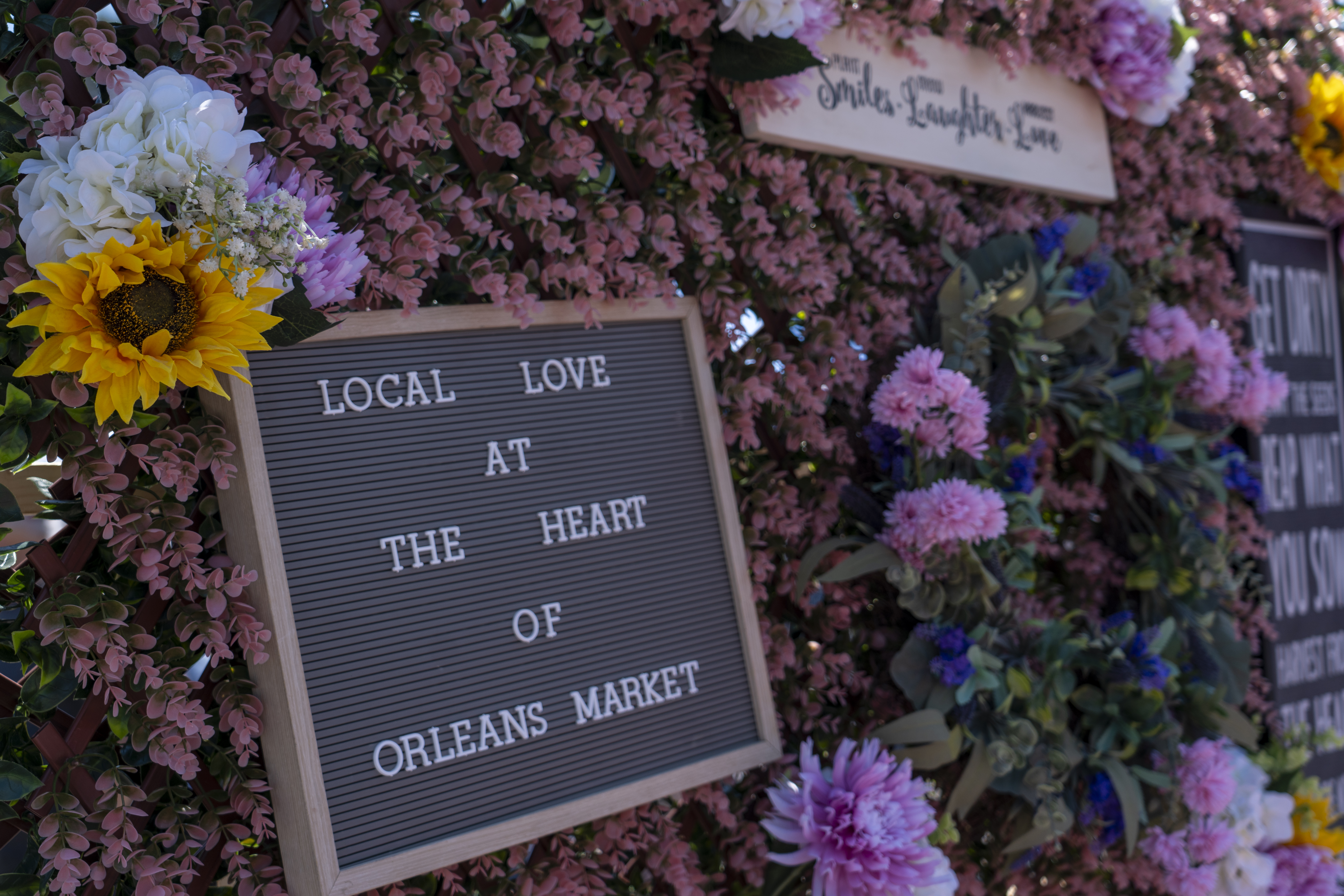
The Heart of Orléans Market

Orléans has a diverse cultural identity shaped by its historical Francophone heritage, suburban development, and growth as part of Ottawa's east end. Orléans has a strong bilingual population and francophone community and culture. A large part of the population is Franco-Ontarian. Historically, the community was one of Ontario's largest Franco-Ontarian centres, and French language institutions, cultural organizations, and bilingual public services continue to play an important role in local community life. Annual festivals, recreational activities, and seasonal events organized by local organizations all contribute to the area's cultural and civic activities.

Today, approximately 29 to 30 percent of residents speak French as their first language, representing an estimated 37,000 to 42,000 people. The community is home to numerous French language institutions, including the landmark Paroisse St Joseph d'Orléans, a part of the La Cité college campus, and 15 French language elementary schools. French culture is celebrated through community organizations such as the Mouvement d'implication francophone d'Orléans (MIFO), which presents nearly 30 French language performances annually at the Shenkman Arts Centre and Auditorium, Béatrice-Desloges. Other major events include 25 fois Franco, 25 fois les Jeux, which celebrates Franco-Ontarian day and commemorates the legacy of the 2001 Jeux de la Francophonie; the annual Festival Objective Cinéma Desjardins, dedicated to independent and international francophonie cinema; and Le Soleil Jeunesse à Orléans, a family festival featuring francophone artists, workshops, and interactive activities.

=== Festivals and Events ===
Cork and Fork: an annual food and beverage event held at the Shenkman Arts Centre featuring wineries, distilleries, cider producers, breweries, food vendors, and live music.

Fête Frissons: A winter carnival hosted in early February at the Shenkman Arts Centre. Activities include live entertainment, ice carving, hot chocolate stations, and snow based activities.

Santa's Parade of Lights: held annually on the last Saturday in November along St. Joseph Boulevard, this parade features themed floats and marching bands. The event if organized by the Ottawa Firefighters Association.

The Heart of Orléans BIA Annual Night Market and Tree Lighting: Held annually in November on Centrum Boulevard, this community event is organized by The Heart of Orléans Business Improvement Area. It includes a holiday market, live performances, seasonal refreshments, visits from Santa Claus and reindeer, and a tree lighting ceremony.

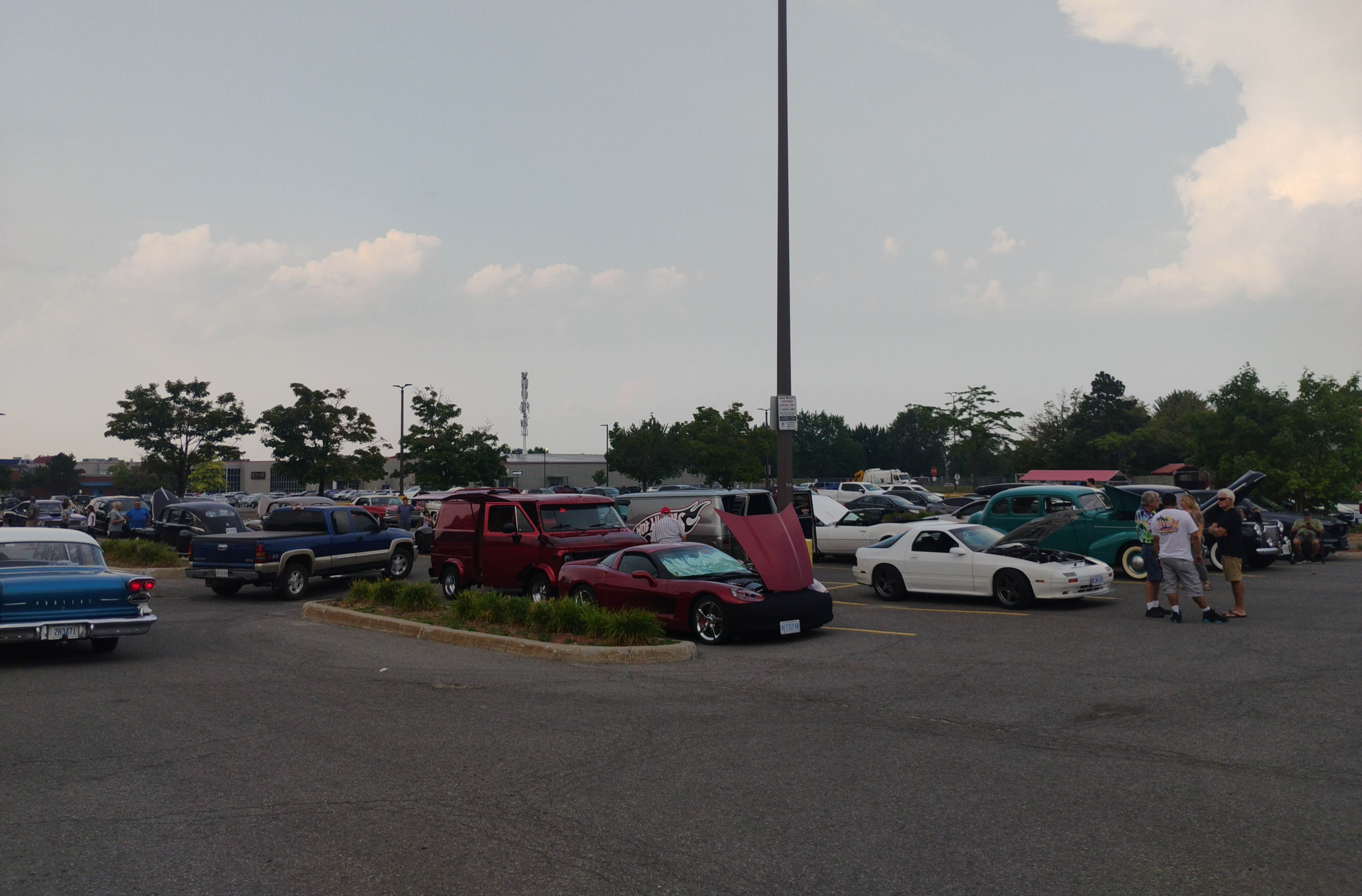
Orléans Capital Cruisers Cruise Night

Orléans Holiday Arts Market: held annually at the Shenkman Arts Centre, this holiday market is presented by the Shenkman Arts Centre in partnership with YZETA Meeting and Event Management. The event features local artisans and vendors, children's activities, and live entertainment, and is offered as a bilingual event.

Orléans Fun Fair: held annually over a weekend in mid may at the Ray Friel Recreation Complex (1585 Tenth Line Road), this fair includes amusement rides, carnival games, and food vendors.

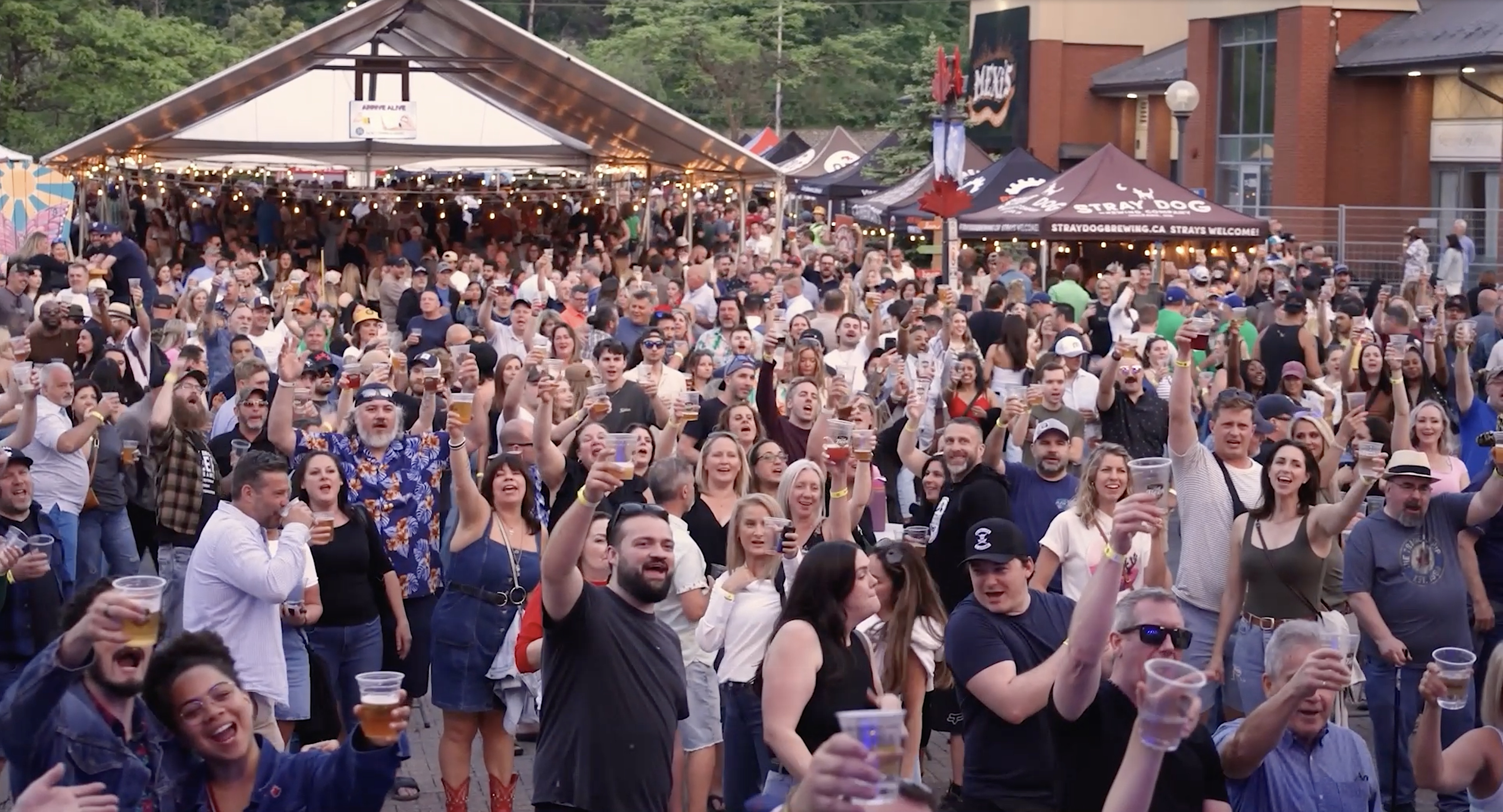
Orléans Craft Beer Festival

Orléans Capital Cruisers Cruise Night: held weekly on late Thursday afternoons at the Fallingbrook Centre (1675 Tenth Line Rd). Which is a car meet where people can see unique cars within the Orléans community, primarily being American Classics

Orléans Craft Beer Festival: held annually in early June at Centrum Plaza, the festival features regional breweries, food vendors, and live music.

Farmers’ Market: operated seasonally on Thursday afternoons, the market includes vendors selling produce and other goods from regional farmers, bakers, and artisans.

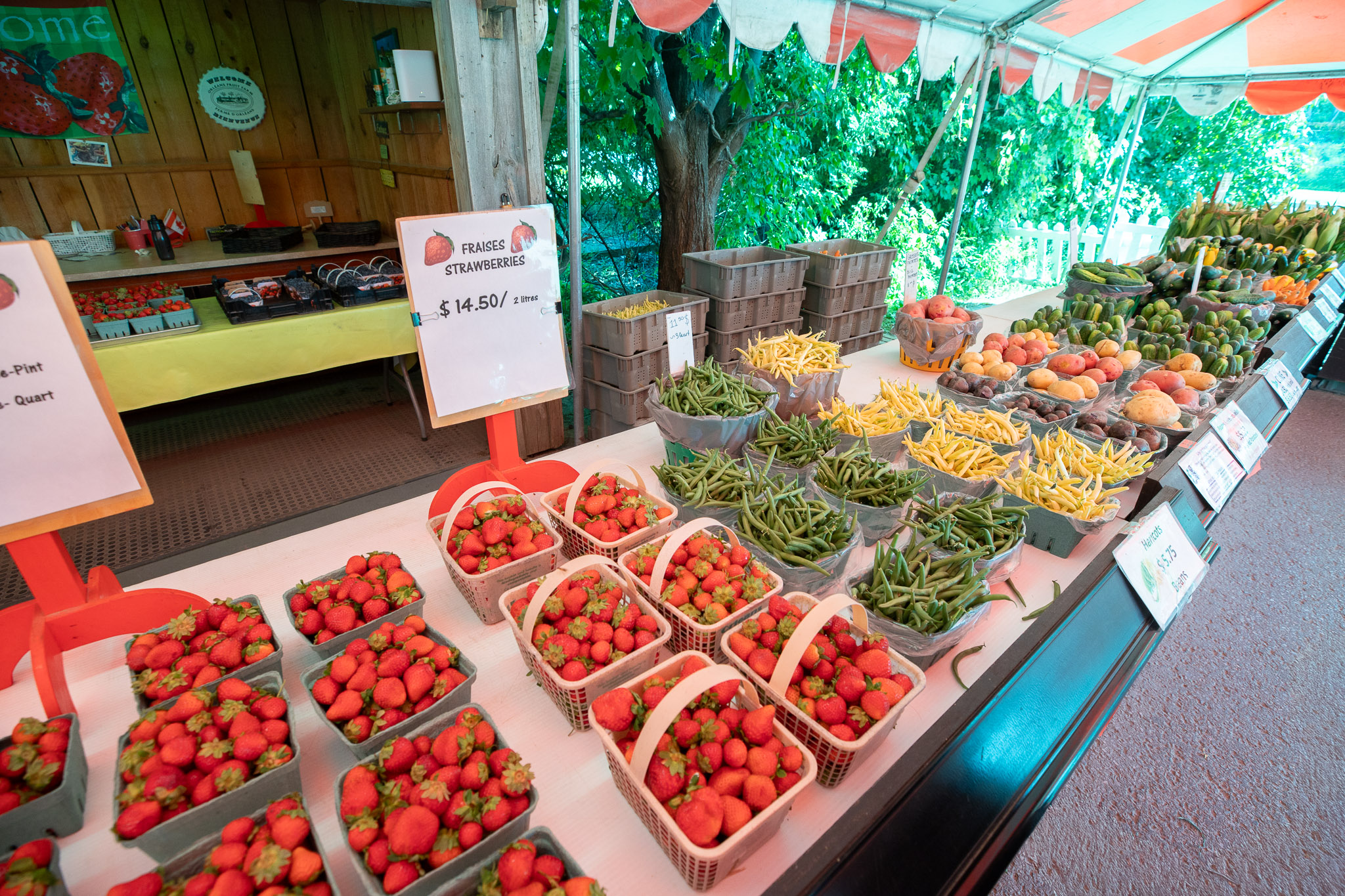
Orléans Farmers Market

Heart of Orléans Market: A monthly market held of the first Sunday of each month from August to November at Orléans Town Centre (290 Centrum Boulevard). The market includes vendors selling food, handmade crafts, and other goods.

Orléans Comic Book & Novelty Show: Held quarter-annually, it is a free comic con that is hosted by Entertainment Ink and takes place in the Place d'Orléans shopping centre. The convention celebrates comics, pop culture and welcomes cosplay.

Orléans Ribfest and Buttertart Festival: Held annually at Centrum Plaza, the festival includes barbecue vendors, food trucks, a beverage garden, and live musical performances. During the same weekend, local businesses participate in butter tart competitions.

Orléans Farmers’ Market: operated seasonally on Thursday afternoons, the market includes vendors selling produce and other goods from regional farmers, bakers, and artisans.

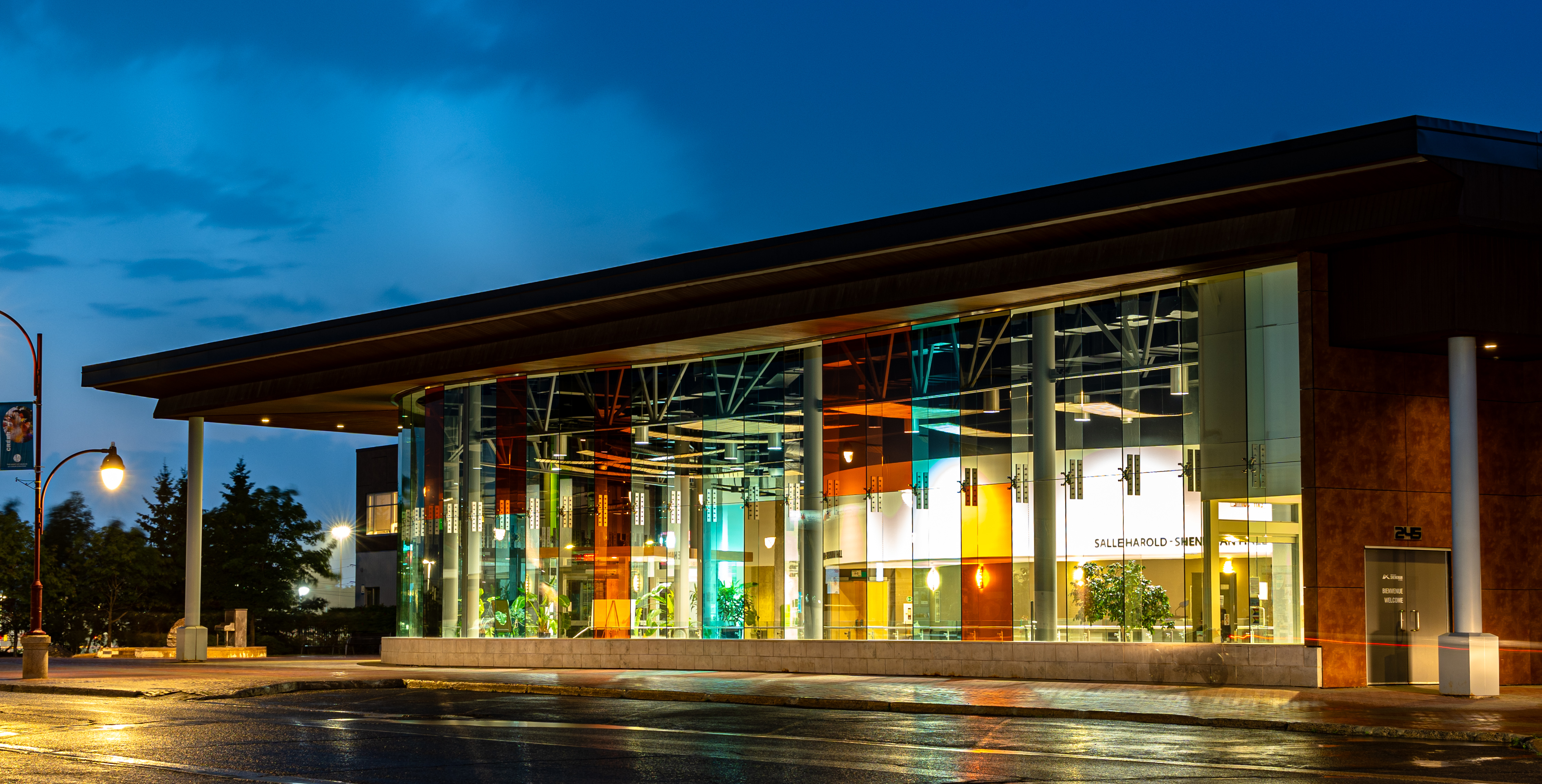
Shenkman Arts Centre, Located at 245 Centrum Blvd

=== Arts ===
MIFO (movement implication francophone d'Orléans: is a Francophone cultural organization located at Place d'Orléans. It provides programs and activities related to French - language arts, culture and community engagement in the region.

Seasonal festivals: festivals include community events such as the Orléans Holiday Arts market, which features local artisans, handmade goods, and regional vendors.

Shenkman Arts Centre: is a cultural facility that includes spaces for live performances, arts education programs, gallery exhibitions, community events, and facility rentals.

Gloucester Pottery School: offers pottery classes at the Shenkman Arts Centre.

Orléans Photo Club: is a small organization for east end photographers and those wanting to learn. Meetings are held at the Notre Dame Des Champs Community Centre The group meets once a month and includes guest speakers, photo outings and events, and networking.

=== Music ===
School of Rock Orléans: is a music education program located at 2003 St. Joseph Boulevard. The school provides performance based instruction, with students learning through group rehearsals and participating in live performances.

Coro Vivo Ottawa: A community choir of approximately 70 members that holds weekly rehearsals at the Orléans United Church. The choir sings genres ranging from Brahms and Haydn, Broadway and Folk. Concerts are preformed two to three times a year, with professional musicians and soloists hired for these performances.

Stray Dog Brewing Company: frequently hosts acoustic and indie performances of original artists and singer-songwriters

The Royal Oak: located at 1981 St. Joseph Boulevard, this restaurant hosts weekly live music, open mic nights on Fridays, and karaoke Saturdays.

Orléans Unplugged: A free outdoor concert series held on Friday evenings during July and August, featuring performances by local musicians.

=== Media ===
Orléans is served by English and French language media outlets, including coverage from Ottawa-based news organizations and local publications. Local media sources provide coverage of community news, events, and municipal affairs in the area.

Print:

The Orléans Star/l'Orléanais: is a community newspaper published in French and English by Orléans Online. The publications provide coverage of local news, including community events, sports, and local interest stories. The newspapers are available in print and digital formats, with distribution through community pickup locations and online editions.

East Ottawa News: publishes the Weekly Journal , a community newspaper serving areas in Ottawa's east end. The publication covers local news, community events, and listings of upcoming events. Radio & Television:

Regional stations: Orléans is part of the Ottawa - Gatineau broadcast market and receives television and radio services from stations serving the region. Broadcast transmission facilities for the Ottawa area are located at Camp Fortune. English language television services in the area include CBC News Ottawa and CTV News Ottawa. French language services include ici Radio -Canada Télé and TVA.

Radio stations serving the area include 580 CFRA, which provides news, traffic, weather, and current affairs programming for the Ottawa Region.

== Recreation ==
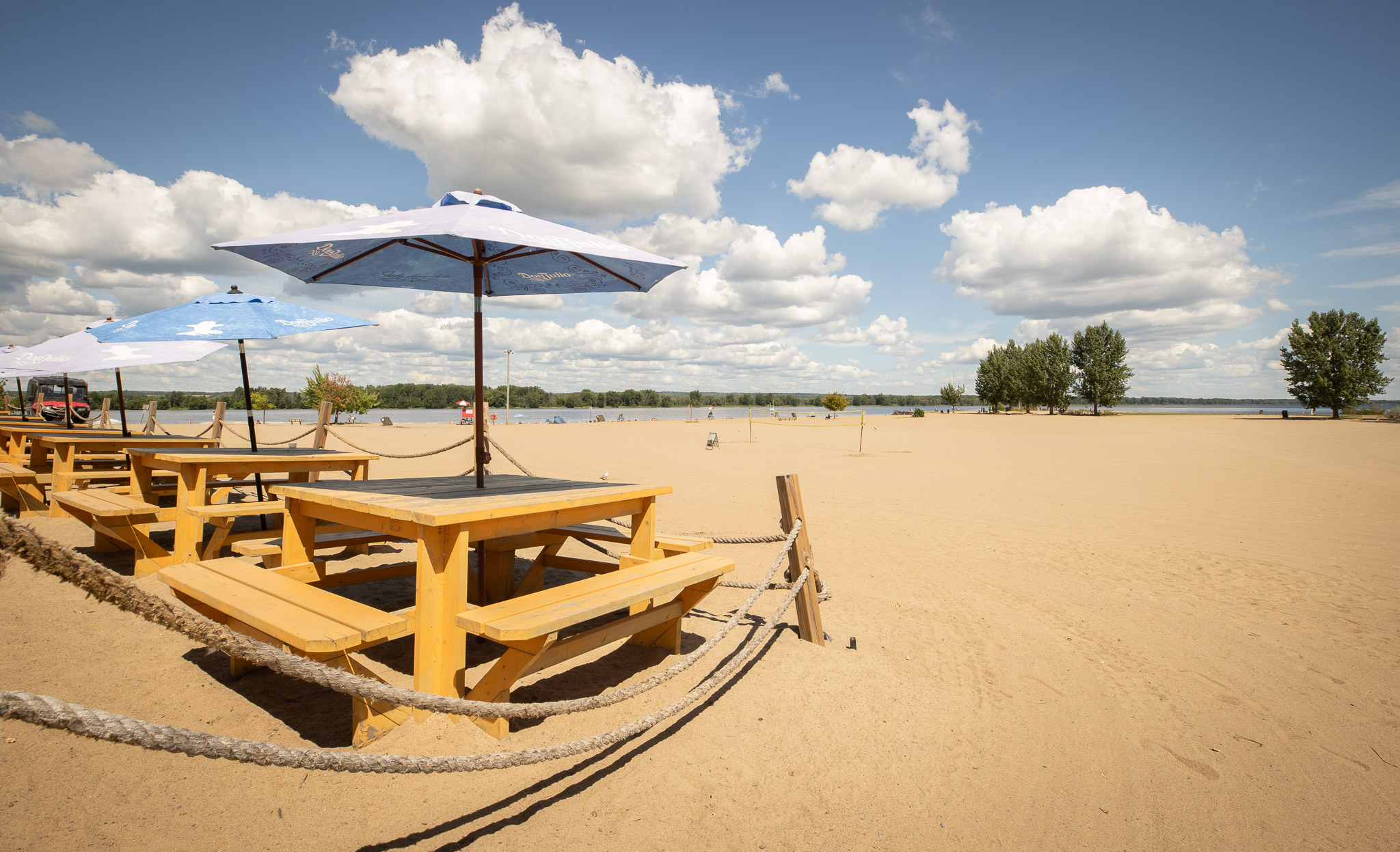
Petrie Island Beach

Petrie Island Beach: A park on Petrie Island featuring sandy beaches, supervised swimming areas, the Petrie Island Canoe Cluband nature trails Water quality information is available through the City of Ottawa Beach Water Quality page.

Petrie Island Fishing: Petrie Island Marina & Oziles' Marina offer various summer and ice fishing opportunities, such as with a bait & tackle shop, ice cabin rentals, and boat rent and launching areas.

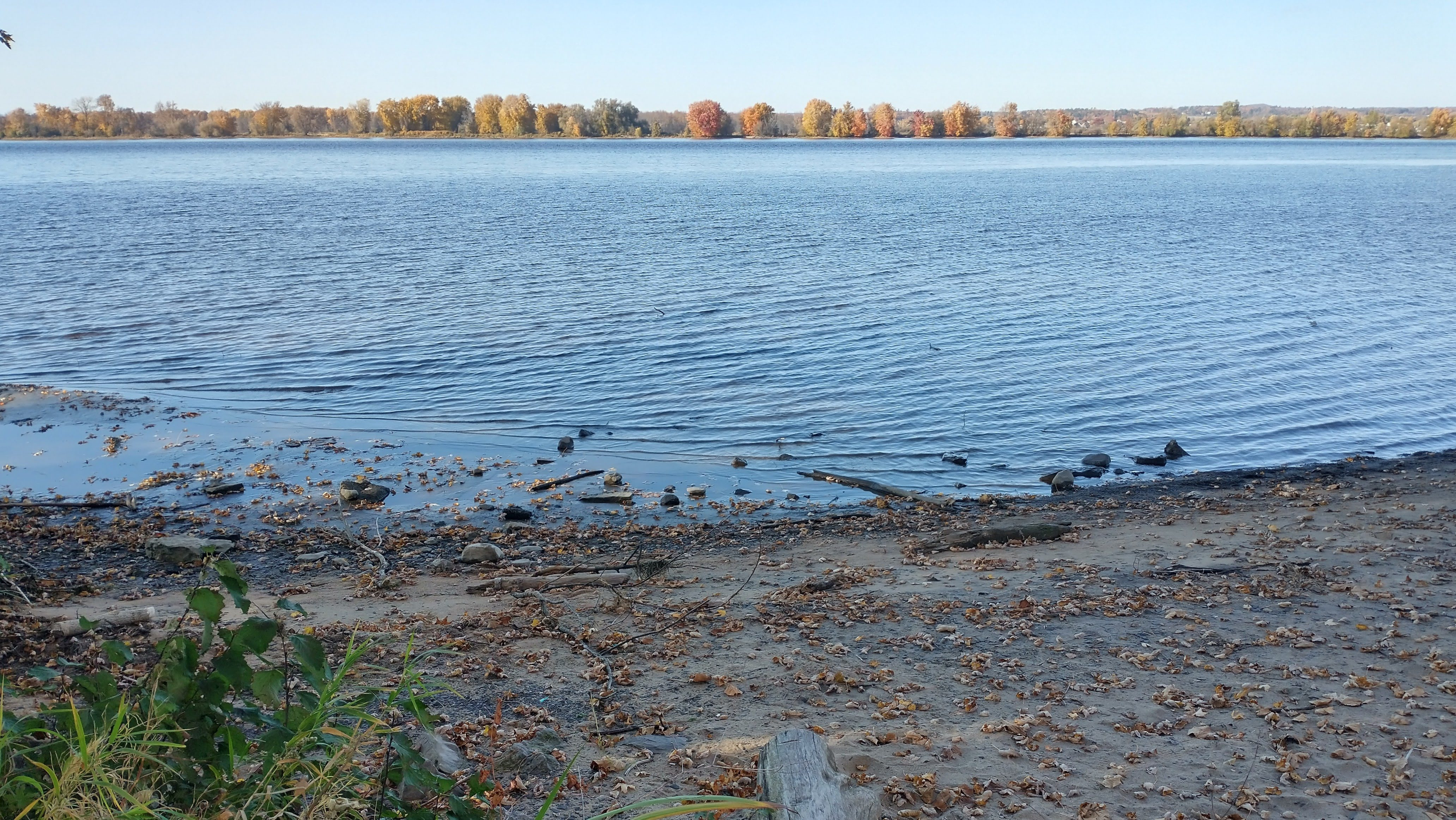
Ottawa River from Petrie Island

Princess Louise Falls: A waterfall located along St. Joseph Boulevard, with accessible hiking trails leading to viewing areas.

Ski Heritage East/Riverside Trail: A multi-use trail stretching along the river used for cycling, running, and walking. During the winter, sections of the trail are used for cross-country skiing and winter cycling.

Ottawa River Pathway: a paved multi-use pathway that runs along the Ottawa River for approximately 31 kilometres, (19 miles).

Outdoor Skating Rinks: There are approximately 30 to 35 community operated outdoor skating rinks within the Orléans neighbourhoods. Information on ice

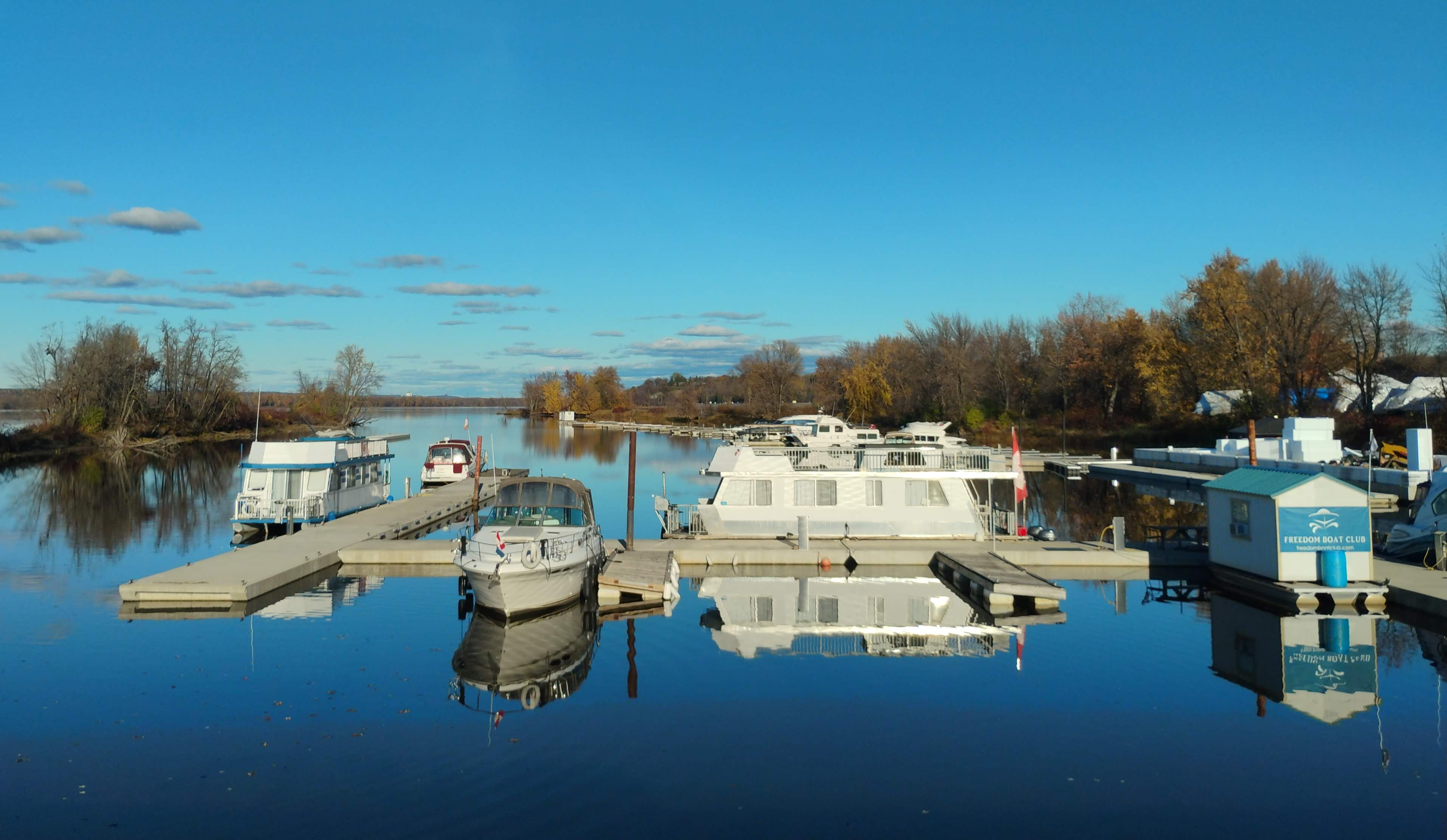
Petrie Island Marina

conditions is available through OttawaRinks.ca and the City of Ottawa Interactive Map

Sledding & Tobogganing: Apollo crater Park and Barnabe Park, and the Green's Creek sledding hill, located west of Orléans in the National Capital Commission Greenbelt off Bearbrook Road, are used for sledding and tobogganing. Green's Creek Hill includes multiple toboggan runs and is equipped with floodlights for evening use.

=== Sports ===
Community Recreation Centres:

- Ray Friel Recreation Complex
- Bob Macquarrie Recreation Complex
- François Dupuis Recreation Centre

Includes:

- Swimming pools
- Fitness facilities
- Community programs
- Aquatic programs

Sports Organizations:

- Orléans Minor Hockey Association
- East End Minor Hockey Association
- Gloucester Skating Club
- Cumberland Panthers Football Club
- Ottawa TFC soccer programs
- Tumblers Gymnastics Centre
- Club de gymnastique Les Sitelles

== Education ==
Education in Orléans is served by Ontario's four publicly funded school systems, providing residents with access to English Public (OCDSB), English Catholic (OCSB), French Public (CEPEO), and French Catholic (CECCE) education. Reflecting the community's large Franco-Ontarian population, Orléans offers extensive French language and French immersion programs, which are well established throughout the suburb. As Orléans continues to experience significant residential growth, particularly in communities such as Avalon and Fallingbrook, educational infrastructure has expanded to meet increasing demand.

=== Elementary Schools ===
English Public Elementary Schools

- Avalon Public School
- Convent Glen Elementary School
- Dunning-Foubert Elementary School
- Fallingbrook Community Elementary School
- Forest Valley Elementary School
- Henry Larsen Elementary School
- Maple Ridge Elementary School
- Summerside Public School
- Terry Fox Elementary School
- Trillium Elementary School

English Catholic Elementary Schools

- Chapel Hill Catholic School
- Convent Glen Catholic School
- Divine Infant Elementary School
- Our Lady of Wisdom School
- St. Clare School
- St. Dominic School
- St. Francis of Assisi School
- St. Kateri Tekakwitha Catholic School
- St. Theresa Catholic School

French Public Elementary Schools

- École élémentaire publique Des Sentiers
- École élémentaire publique Jeanne-Sauvé
- École élémentaire publique L'Odyssée
- École élémentaire publique Le Prélude

French Catholic Elementary Schools

- École élémentaire catholique Alain-Fortin
- École élémentaire catholique Arc-en-Ciel
- École élémentaire catholique de la Découverte
- École élémentaire catholique des Pionniers
- École élémentaire catholique des Voyageurs
- École élémentaire catholique Notre-Place
- École élémentaire catholique Reine-des-Bois
- École élémentaire catholique Saint-Joseph d'Orleans

=== High Schools ===
English Public High Schools

- Cairine Wilson Secondary School
- Sir Wilfred Laurier Secondary School

English Catholic High Schools

- St. Matthew High School
- St. Peter High School

French Public High Schools

- École secondaire publique Gisèle-Lalonde

French Catholic High Schools

- École secondaire catholique Garneau
- École secondaire catholique Béatrice-Desloges

=== Colleges ===
- La Cité

== Landmarks ==
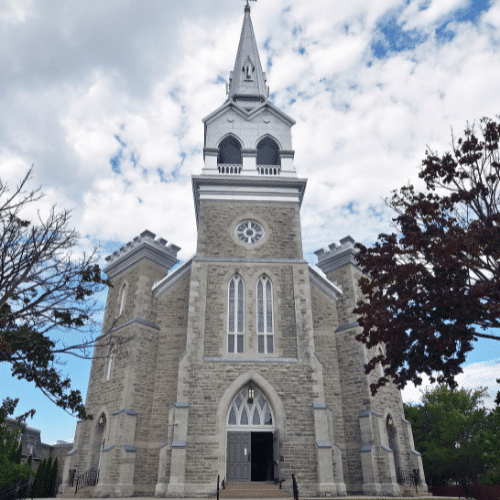
Paroisse St-Joseph Church

Paroisse St-Joseph d'Orléans:

Located at 2757 St-Joseph Boulevard, the church has been a notable landmark in Orléans since the 1830s. As the oldest francophone parish in the region, it reflects the area's early French-Canadian Catholic roots and remains an important historical and spiritual centre in the heart of Orléans.

Legion Branch:

A memorial diorama by Bruce Garner was unveiled on August 13, 2000, in the Memorial Park near Royal Canadian Legion, Branch 632. This diorama was created to remember Canadians who served in wars and as peace keepers. The park is located close to Petrie Island Beach, and is located on Taylor Creek Drive. The park features memorial plaques, statues, Canadian and Ontarian flag, and benches overviewing them. The Legion has ongoing activities, which include an annual Remembrance Day ceremony.

The Orléans Fruit Farm:

Established in 1917, the Orléans Fruit Farm is located within Ottawa's Greenbelt. The farm has been operated by the Henrie family for more than 50 years and produces a variety of seasonal fruits and vegetables, which are sold directly from the farm. From May through October, it offers fresh produce as well as pick-your-own experiences from crops including apples, strawberries and pumpkins.

Vinette Silo:

Located at 241 Centrum Boulevard, the Vinette Silo is a heritage-designated structure built in 1945. Constructed from fieldstones and homemade cement by brothers Rhéo and Lionel Vinette, it is the last remaining concrete feed silo in Orléans. The structure serves as a reminder of the community's agricultural past and its transition from a rural farming area to a modern suburban community, in which key rural elements remain a staple, such as the silo.

Shenkman Arts Centre:

Located at 245 Centrum Boulevard, the Shenkman Arts Centre is an 86,000 square foot (7,989.6 square metres) multidisciplinary arts and cultural facility in the heart of Orléans Town Centre. Opened in 2009 through a public-private partnership with the City of Ottawa, the centre provides dedicated spaces for English and French language artistic and cultural programming. The facility is named in honour of Harold Shenkman, whose family made a significant founding donation to establish the centre's endowment fund.

Place d'Orléans:

Established in 1979, Place d'Orléans began as a small town shopping centre and has since grown into the largest enclosed shopping mall in eastern Ottawa at 740,000 square feet (68,748.2 square metres). The mall underwent major expansions in 1984, 1988, and 1990, followed by a multimillion-dollar renovation in 2017.

Ray Friel Recreation Complex:

Opened in 1994 and located on 1585 Tenth Line Rd, it is the largest and most comprehensive recreation complex in Orléans, featuring three National Hockey League (NHL) size arenas including the Ron Racette Arena. The complex also features a fitness centre with over 20,000 square feet (1858 square feet) of state-of-the-art training equipment, wave pool, whirlpool, sauna, physiotherapy clinic, martial arts centre, restaurant and a coffee shop.

Bob Macquarrie Recreation Complex:

Bob Macquarrie Recreation Complex is a major community recreation facility located at 140 Youville Drive. Opened in 1980 as the Orléans Recreation Complex, it provides sports, aquatic, fitness and cultural facilities for the surrounding community. The complex was renamed in 2007 in honour of former Gloucester mayor and provincial politician Bob Macquarrie.

== Transportation ==
Driving

Orléans is overall a car-centric suburb, with most households in having two or more vehicles. Orléans is supported by several major roadways that facilitate local and regional travel. Regional Road 174, which connects directly to Highway 174 (the Queensway), serves as a key route for northern Orléans traffic and commuters traveling toward downtown Ottawa. Innes Road is a major arterial route through southern Orléans, connecting communities such as Avalon and Notre-Dame-des-Champs to Highway 417. Brian Coburn Boulevard helps reduce congestion on Innes Road and provides important east–west connection for the area.

Public Transportation

Public transportation, especially for those commuting to the main City of Ottawa, is manageable, but not generally favorable. Key routes serving the community include Route 30, which connects Blair Station to Millenium; Route 33, linking Portobello with Blair, Route 35, serving Avalon to Blair; and Routes 38 and 39, which provide additional connections to the area. Neighbourhood focused routes, such as Route 31 connecting Tenth Line to Place d'Orléans and Route 36 linking Innes road to Place d'Orléans. The developing O train Line 1 East extension, part of Ottawa's Stage 2 LRT project, adds 12 kilometres (7 miles) of new rail service, extending the line beyond Blair Station along the median of Regional Road 174. Public Transportation in Orléans is at places lackluster, especially with connecting Orléans to the City of Ottawa, as cited by residents complaints.

Walkability

Orléans offers a network of active transportation routes, including recreational cycling paths along scenic areas such as the Ottawa River Parkway. Orléans offers key nature and trails within rural proximity, such as Bilberry Creek Trail, Cardinal Creek Karst Path, Princess Louise Waterfalls Trails, and trails on Petrie Island where residents can enjoy nature scenery and activities such as swimming, fishing and hiking.

=== Major Streets ===
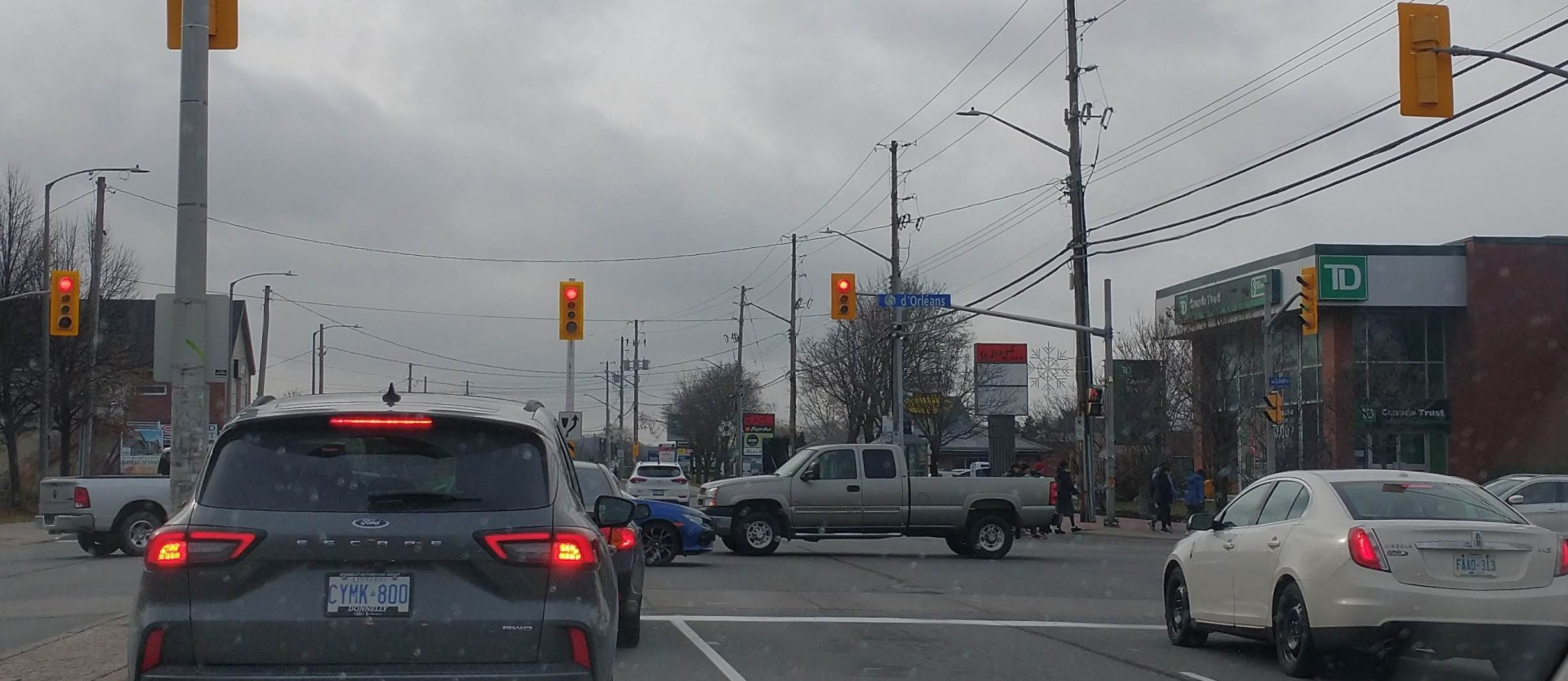
St Joseph Blvd & Orléans Blvd intersection

Road	Description
Orléans Boulevard	A major north - south arterial road extending approximately 16 km (9.9 mi) from St. Joseph Boulevard near the Ottawa River to Navan Road and Des Grands Champs Boulevard. It connects several residential areas and provides access to Highway 174.
Champlain Street	A north - south road parallel to Orléans Boulevard. It provides access to Place d'Orléans and the Orléans Park and Ride transit facility.
Jeanne d'Arc Boulevard	A major east - west route divided into northern and southern sections, connecting residential and commercial areas on both sides of Highway 174.
Des Épinettes Avenue	A short connector road linking Jeanne d'Arc Boulevard and Tenth Line Road.
St. Joseph Boulevard	A historic east - west arterial road and former main street of Orléans, connecting western and eastern parts of the community.
Charlemagne Boulevard	A residential connector road running through Fallingbrook and connecting Tenth Line Road with Princess Louise Drive.
Innes Road	A major east - west arterial road extending through Ottawa's east end, including Orléans and connecting suburban communities with central Ottawa.
Tenth Line Road	A north - south route extending from Jeanne d'Arc Boulevard through Orléans to rural areas south of Navan Road.
Portobello Boulevard	A north - south arterial road serving the Avalon community, extending from Brian Coburn Boulevard towards Innes Road.
Trim Road	A major north - south route extending from Jeanne d'Arc Boulevard through Orléans, Cumberland, and Navan towards rural areas.
Mer Bleue / Brian Coburn Boulevard	A controlled access highway connecting Orléans to central Ottawa and other parts of the city.
Highway 174 (Ottawa Regional Road 174)	A controlled access highway connecting Orléans with central Ottawa and other parts of the city.

== Economy ==
Businesses:

Orléans is home to a variety of independent businesses and major retail chains, reflecting its strong entrepreneurial culture and predominantly locally driven economy. The community is also served by Place d'Orléans Shopping Centre, one of the area's major retail destinations. This mall features over 175 shops and large retailers under one roof.

Income:

The average income across individual tax filers in the broader Orléans area recorded an average individual income between $123,000 and $143,400. Census data indicates that household income levels are also comparatively high, with a substantial majority of households (60% to 65%) in the Orléans sector reporting gross annual incomes of over $100,000.

Housing Tenure:

Home ownership is prevalent within the area, as approximately 85% of households owning their residences and around 15% occupying rental housing. The high ownership rates is associated with the area's relatively strong income levels and the presence of many dual-income households, including public sector employees, who contribute to the demand for larger housing options, such as detached homes, townhouses and multi bedroom properties.

Employment Rate:

Orléans has an employment rate of approximately 64%, broadly consistent with the overall rate for the City of Ottawa. Within the area's primary family oriented neighbourhoods, including Avalon, Fallingbrook and Notting Gate, employment rates are higher among the core working age population (25 to 64 years), reaching approximately 78%.

Low income prevalence in Orléans remains relatively low, with approximately 5.3% of residents classified as living below low income thresholds. This rate is significantly lower than the overall City of Ottawa average, reflecting comparatively strong household income levels and economic stability within the community.

Main Key Sectors:

The local business landscape is led by the health and wellness sector, which accounts for approximately 37% of businesses, followed by professional services at 33%, restaurants, food and beverage establishments make up 14% of businesses, while retail accounts for 10%, contributing to a diverse and resilient local economy.

Income Distribution and socioeconomic profile:

Orléans has a predominantly middle to upper income demographic, with household income reflecting a highly affluent suburban profile within the Ottawa region. The area has a high concentration of dual income households, supported by employment in sectors such as the federal public service, high tech industries, and healthcare. This economic profile contributes to strong household purchasing power and demand for family oriented housing and community amenities.

== Housing ==
Orléans is a predominantly suburban community characterized by a mix of low and medium density residential development. Single detached houses form the largest share of housing stock, accounting for more than half of all occupied private dwellings. Row and townhouse developments comprise approximately 30% of housing, while apartments and condominiums represent about 9% and semi detached houses approximately 4%. The community's housing mix reflects its historical development as a family oriented suburb, although recent planning policies have encouraged higher density residential construction surrounding the Stage 2 O train extension and major commercial corridors. As of the end of the 2025 calendar year, there was approximately 52,680 households residing within the community.

=== Housing types ===
Single detached houses have historically been the dominant housing form in Orléans and are concentrated throughout established neighbourhoods such as Fallingbrook, Convent Glen, Queenswood Heights, and newer communities including Avalon and Notting Gate. Residential construction from the 1980s and 1990s largely consists of two-storey and split-level homes, while more recent subdivisions feature contemporary designs and higher density neighbourhood layouts.

Townhouses constitute the second largest housing type in Orléans and include freehold, stacked, and urban townhouse developments. They are particularly common in Avalon, Orléans Wood, and along Tenth Line Road corridor.

Semi detached houses make up a comparatively small portion of the housing stock and are dispersed throughout mature neighbourhoods including Convent Glen and Chatelaine Village.

Apartments and condominiums development has increased in recent years, particularly along Innes Road, near Place d'Orléans, and around existing and future O Train stations as residential intensification has expanded within the community.

Much of Orléans was developed as a series of master planned suburban neighbourhoods beginning in the late 1960s. Individual communities were generally constructed in phases and incorporated schools, parks, neighbourhood commercial areas, recreational facilities as part of their overall design.

=== Architectural Characteristics ===
The architectural characteristics of Orléans reflects successive phases of residential and commercial development from the late 19th century to the present. While the historic village core along St. Joseph Boulevard retains a small collection of early buildings, most of the community consists of suburban neighbourhoods constructed from the 1970s onward. These successive phases of development reflect changing architectural styles, planning styles, planning practices, and residential growth patterns.

==== Historic Village Core ====
The historic core along St. Joseph Boulevard and nearby Carrière Street retains a collection of 19th and early 20th century buildings, including former farmhouses, stone and brick commercial buildings, and civic structures associated with the community's early development. The Paroisse St. Joseph Church, distinguished by its silver coloured spire, remains one of Orléans' most recognizable architectural landmarks.

==== Suburban Neighbourhoods ====
Large scale suburban neighbourhoods developed from the late 1960s onward are characterized by detached homes, curvilinear street patterns, crescents, and cul-de-sacs. Early communities such as Convent Glen and Queenswood Heights feature ranch style and split level homes situated on comparatively large lots with attached garages and generous setbacks.

Neighbourhoods developed during the 1980s and 1990s, including Fallingbrook and Chapel Hill, are dominated by two storey detached homes with brick façades, freehold townhouses, landscaped streetscapes, and neighbourhood parks. Many were planned as integrated suburban communities with schools, recreational facilities, and commercial services.

Residential development since the early 2000s has continued eastward into communities such as Avalon, Notting Gate, and Cardinal Creek. These neighbourhoods generally feature narrower lot frontages, increased residential densities, and a broader mix of housing forms, including stacked townhouses, apartments, and condominium developments.

==== Commercial and Civic Architecture ====
Commercial development is concentrated primarily along St. Joseph Boulevard and Innes Road. St. Joseph Boulevard retains a traditional commercial streetscape consisting of older storefronts and neighbourhood businesses, while Innes Road developed during the late 20th and early 21st centuries as a regional retail corridor characterized by shopping plazas, commercial power centres, and large format retail development.

Contemporary civic architecture is represented by the Shenkman Arts Centre on Centrum Boulevard, which incorporates extensive glazing, exposed structural elements, and public gathering spaces. The facility serves as one of the community's principal cultural landmarks.

=== Transit Oriented Development ===
Since the 2020s, residential and mixed use development in Orléans has increasingly been guided by transit oriented development (TOD) principles following the construction of the Stage 2 O train east extension. The City of Ottawa's Orléans Corridor Secondary Plan encourages higher density development around rapid transit stations while promoting mixed use communities, improved pedestrian connectivity, and active transportation infrastructure.

Under the Secondary Plan, the highest density residential and commercial development is concentrated within walking distance of O Train stations, with building heights gradually transitioning to established low density residential neighbourhoods. The plan also promotes complete streets, cycling infrastructure, and multi use pathways that improve access between residential areas, commercial centres, and transit stations.

Planning policies have also reduced or eliminated minimum parking requirements in portions of the corridor to encourage transit use and support higher density development. As redevelopment continues along the Highway 171 corridor and around O Train stations, transit oriented development has become a significant component of Orléans' long term urban planning strategy.

== Heart of Orléans Business Improvement Area (BIA) ==
The Heart of Orléans Business Improvement Area is a Business Improvement Area in Orléans, Ottawa, Ontario. Established in 2006, it operates as a Local Board of Ottawa City Council, guided by a volunteer Board of Management. The BIA represents close to 800 businesses and works to promote, enhance, and support Orléans' commercial district.

The BIA's mandate is to promote the area as a district, advocate on behalf of behalf of its members, and support streetscape beautification. Its vision is to attract and support businesses that contribute to the character of The Heart of Orléans while fostering an engaged business community. The BIA's activities include business promotion, public realm improvements, streetscape beautification, community events, and partnerships that encourage economic development and community engagement.

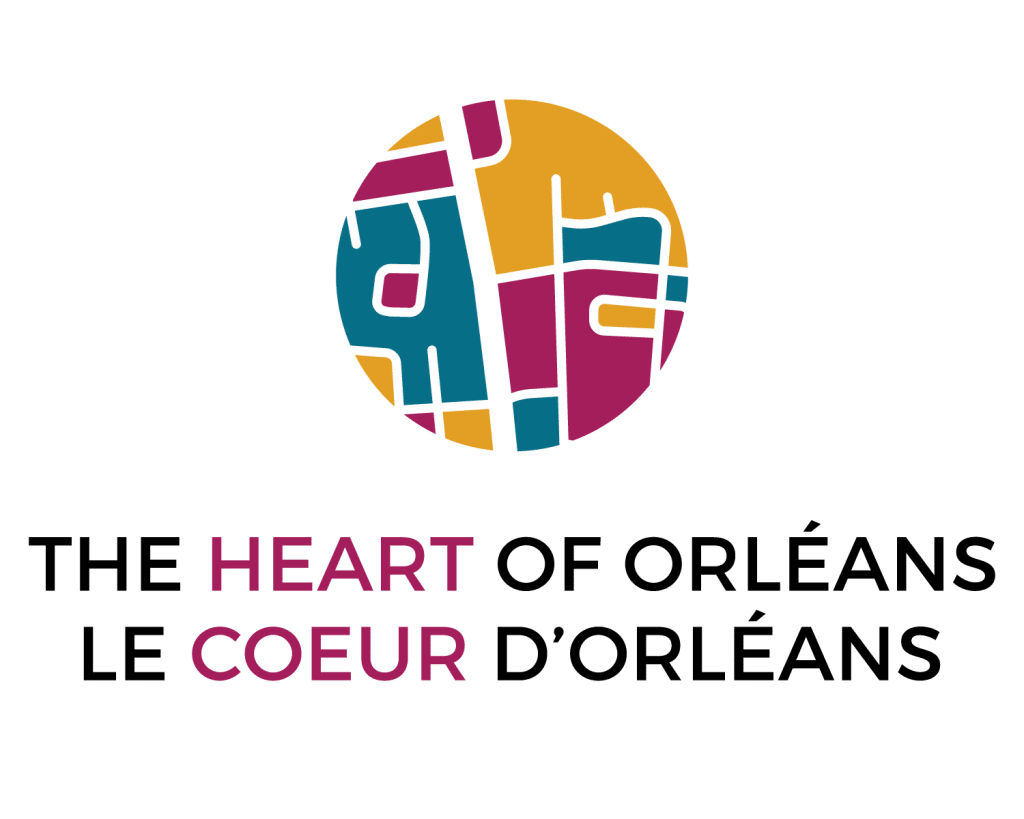

Initiatives:

- Balance Orléans campaign: was an advocacy initiative launched in 2018 in response to employment imbalances in the community, including that approximately 80% of Orléans residents commuted westward for work in 2018. The initiative highlighted the limited presence of major employers in Orléans and advocated for increased economic development, investment, and employment opportunities in Ottawa's east end.
- #WhyNotOrléans campaign: is a community advocacy initiative to promote awareness of Orléans as a growing community and encourages investment, development, and engagement in the area.
- Destination Orléans: is an initiative that promotes Orléans as a destination for dining, shopping, culture, recreation, and community events. The initiative highlights local businesses, arts and cultural attractions, markets, festivals, waterfront areas, and public spaces to encourage visitors and residents to explore the area.

== Government ==
=== Federal ===
- Orléans

=== Provincial ===
- Orléans

=== Municipal ===
- Orléans East-Cumberland
- Orléans West-Innes
- Orléans South-Navan

=== Representation ===
Federal

Marie-France Lalonde is the Member of Parliament (MP) representing the federal riding of Orléans in the House of Commons.

Provincial

Stephen Blais is the Member of Provincial Parliament (MPP) representing the provincial riding of Orléans in the Legislative Assembly of Ontario.

Orléans is represented on Ottawa City Council by councillors from three municipal wards.

Matthew Luloff has represented Orléans East - Cumberland (Ward 1) on Ottawa City Council since 2018.

Catherine Kitts has represented Orléans South - Navan (formerly Cumberland Ward) on Ottawa City Council since 2020 and serves as one of Ottawa's Deputy Mayors.

== Notable Residents ==
- Elizabeth Manley (born 1965): is a Canadian figure skater who trained in the Ottawa area during the 1970s and 1980s after her family relocated there due to her father's military career. Her early skating development in the region is associated with the Gloucester Skating Club, where she trained at the Bob MacQuarrie Recreation Complex. The facility includes the Elizabeth Manley rink, named in her honour.
- Marc Savard (born 1977): is a Canadian former professional ice hockey player who grew up in Orléans, Ottawa. He played minor league hockey for the Cumberland Barons before advancing to the Ontario Hockey League (OHL), where he joined the Oshawa Generals in 1993.
- Phil McNeely (born 1947): is a Politician and former member of Provincial Parliament for Ottawa-Orléans (2003–2014.) He has long resided in the Orléans area.
- Marie-France Lalonde (born 1971): is a Politician who is serving as a member of the Provincial Parliament for Ottawa-Orléans and as a member of Parliament for Orléans since 2019. She is a former co-owner of Portobello Manor, where she received recognition from the Orléans Chamber of Commerce. She has represented residents of the region for over a decade and currently serves as the federal MP for the area. She lives in Orléans with her husband, Alvaro and daughter, Monica.
- Andrew Leslie (born 1957): is a retired Canadian Forces Lieutenant-General and former politician who represented the federal riding of Orléans in the House of Commons from 2015 to 2019, following his victory in the 2015 federal election. During his 35-year military career, he lived in the area at various periods. He was appointed Commander of the Order of Military Merit and received the United States Legion of Merit.
- Royal Galipeau (1947–2018): he was a Franco-Ontarian politician who served as the Conservative Member of Parliament for Ottawa-Orléans from 2006 to 2015. He served as the Deputy Speaker of the House of Commons during the 39th Parliament (2006–2008) and sponsored legislation establishing National Tree Day in Canada.
- Codi Ceci (born 1993): is a NHL defenceman who was raised in Orléans. He attended local schools including St. Peter Catholic High School.

== Facts ==
- Orléans is named after Orléans, France.
- In 1997, Ottawa Street, which had an original purpose of a trading route, was renamed to St. Joseph Boulevard.
- Petrie Island is a habitat for turtles and around 130 bird species.
- In June 1994, the Ontario Geographic Names Board changed the spelling of Orléans to have the accent in both French and English.

== Notes ==
1. History and Timeline information was collected from the information in the Orléans, Ontario PDF file uploaded to this page just below.
