= Your Community Voice =

Your Community Voice is an Ottawa-based newspaper that was launched in 2018. It is delivered to across 85,000 homes and businesses across Ottawa and the surrounding areas. Michael Wollock, a long time publisher, decided to create Your Community Voice after Postmedia CEO Paul Godfrey announced the closure of Metroland Media. The paper is distributed every two weeks, with the main areas targeted being Altavista/Canterbury, Huntclub/Riverside Park, Greenboro/South Keys and Kanata/Stittsville.
