= Catherine Kitts =

Canadian politician

Ottawa City Councillor
- Incumbent
- Assumed office October 6, 2020
- Preceded by: Stephen Blais
- Constituency: Cumberland Ward (until 2022); Orléans South-Navan Ward (from 2022)

Personal details
- Born: May 28, 1988 (age 37)

Catherine Kitts (born May 28, 1988) is a Canadian politician. She is currently the city councillor for Orléans South-Navan Ward on Ottawa City Council.

Kitts received a bachelors of journalism degree from Carleton University in 2010. After that, she became editor of the Orléans Star newspaper. She then co-founded a lifestyle blog before starting a digital communications agency in 2015. She also worked at Carleton University in communications, marketing and strategic planning from 2014 to 2020.

Kitts first ran for city council in the 2018 Ottawa municipal election in Orleans Ward, losing to Matthew Luloff by 264 votes. She endorsed Jim Watson for mayor in that election. Following her election, she became a recruitment communications officer at Carleton University. She also moved from Orleans to Navan.

Kitts ran in the 2020 by-election in Cumberland Ward (which contains her new residence), which was vacated when its councillor Stephen Blais was elected to the Legislative Assembly of Ontario. During the campaign, Kitts was endorsed by a number of high-profile Liberals, including Blais, Luloff, MP Marie-France Lalonde, and former MPPs Madeleine Meilleur and Phil McNeely. Kitts was easily elected in the by-election, securing 54% of the vote, with more than twice as many votes as her nearest challenger, Yvette Ashiri. With her win, Kitts became the youngest member of city council. Despite her high profile Liberal endorsements, Kitts has never been a member of any political party, and considers herself a "moderate".

Kitts was easily re-elected in the 2022 Ottawa municipal election in the re-named Orléans South-Navan Ward.
