= Royal Galipeau =

Canadian politician

Royal N. Galipeau
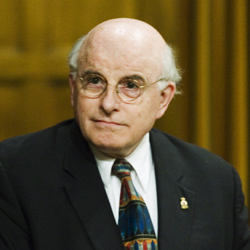

Member of Parliament for Ottawa—Orléans
- In office January 23, 2006 – October 18, 2015
- Preceded by: Marc Godbout
- Succeeded by: Andrew Leslie

Personal details
- Born: January 5, 1947 St-Isidore, Ontario, Canada
- Died: January 27, 2018 (aged 71) Ottawa, Ontario, Canada
- Party: Conservative
- Spouse: Anne Pallascio
- Children: Louis, Paul, Claude & Mimi
- Profession: Advisor, businessman, corporate director

Royal Galipeau (January 5, 1947 – January 27, 2018) was a Canadian politician who was Member of Parliament for the Ottawa—Orléans federal constituency. He was first elected as a Conservative Party candidate in the 2006 election, and was reelected in 2008 and 2011. He was one of the Deputy Speakers of the House of Commons between the 2006 and 2008 elections. He was defeated in the 2015 election by retired Canadian Forces Lieutenant-General Andrew Leslie. In February 2014, he revealed that he was battling multiple myeloma, but insisted he would run for office again in the 2015 election. Galipeau died from the disease in 2018.

== Municipal politics and early career ==
In 1982, he was elected to Gloucester City Council. On city council, he helped introduce equal opportunity hiring policies and unsuccessfully pushed to replace the term "alderman" with a gender-neutral term. In 1985, he ran for mayor of Gloucester, finishing third behind fellow councillor Harry Allen and interim mayor Mitch Owens.

Galipeau was appointed in 2001 by the Council of the newly amalgamated city of Ottawa as Trustee of the Ottawa Public Library, where he helped introduce content-filtered Internet access to city public libraries to protect from Internet pornography on library computers. In 2004, he was the only Trustee of the previous term to be reappointed by City Council. He was twice elected as vice-chair of the Board.

Furthermore, he served on the Ottawa-Carleton Regional District Health Council, helping prepare a policy for the delivery of minority language health services. In 2005, Galipeau was involved in the East-West Light Rail Transit Corridor Environmental Assessment Committee, studying implementation of a rapid transit system across Ottawa. Galipeau has also served two terms as a director of TVOntario. In this role, he helped bring about the launch of the Francophone TFO service.

== Federal politics ==
Galipeau started politics as a Liberal and worked for MPs Mauril Bélanger and Eugène Bellemare. He also served as campaign manager for the unsuccessful Liberal candidate in Carleton in the 1995 Ontario provincial election.

However, in May 2005, he decided to run for the Conservatives. The riding of Ottawa—Orléans was a Conservative target. In the 2004 federal election, Walter Robinson, the high-profile head of the Canadian Taxpayers Federation, failed to capture the seat, losing to Liberal newcomer Marc Godbout by 2,800 votes. Galipeau won the 2006 election by less than 2000 votes.

From April 2006 to November 2008, Galipeau was Deputy Chair of Committees of the Whole, which allowed him to sit in the Speaker's chair when the Speaker and Deputy Speaker were both absent. In May 2007, Galipeau apologized for an incident in which he broke parliamentary rules by crossing the floor to argue with Liberal MP David McGuinty after a heated exchange over the Conservative MP's record on Francophone rights.

After being re-elected in the 2008 election, Galipeau ran to replace Peter Milliken as Speaker of the House, but lost. Galipeau was re-elected in the 2011 election, but was defeated by a nearly 2-to-1 margin in the 2015 federal election to former Lieutenant-General Andrew Leslie of the Liberal Party.

Galipeau was an anti-abortion MP and attended and spoke at the Campaign Life Coalition's annual March for Life event on Parliament Hill several times, including in 2011, 2013, and 2015.

Diagnosed with multiple myeloma, a form of cancer, in 2015, he died of the disease on January 27, 2018.

== Electoral history ==
2015 Canadian federal election: Orléans
Party	Candidate	Votes	%	±%	Expenditures
Liberal	Andrew Leslie	46,542	59.7	+21.72	–
Conservative	Royal Galipeau	23,821	30.5	-14.68	–
New Democratic	Nancy Tremblay	6,215	8.0	-5.98	–
Green	Raphaël Morin	1,410	1.8	-1.06	–
Total valid votes/Expense limit		77,988	100		$240,250.25
Total rejected ballots		272	0.30	–	
Turnout		78,260	81.37	–	
Eligible voters		96,174	–	–	
Liberal notional gain from Conservative		Swing		+18.2	

2011 Canadian federal election: Ottawa–Orléans
Party	Candidate	Votes	%	±%	Expenditures
Conservative	Royal Galipeau	28,584	44.55	-0.29	–
Liberal	David Bertschi	24,649	38.42	-0.32	–
New Democratic	Martine Cenatus	9,086	14.16	+4.06	–
Green	Paul Maillet	1,839	2.87	-3.45	–
Total valid votes/Expense limit		64,158	100.00		
Total rejected ballots		235	0.36	–	
Turnout		64,393	72.76	–	
Eligible voters		88,502	–	–	
Conservative hold		Swing		+0.03	

2008 Canadian federal election: Ottawa–Orléans
Party	Candidate	Votes	%	±%	Expenditures
Conservative	Royal Galipeau	27,206	44.84	+3.80	$87,319
Liberal	Marc Godbout	23,504	38.74	-0.37	$86,870
New Democratic	Amy O'Dell	6,127	10.10	-3.98	$1,544
Green	Paul Maillet	3,833	6.32	+2.50	$3,951
Total valid votes/Expense limit		60,670	100.00	$88,543	
Conservative hold		Swing		+2.09	

2006 Canadian federal election: Ottawa–Orléans
Party	Candidate	Votes	%	±%
Conservative	Royal Galipeau	25,414	41.04	+0.70
Liberal	Marc Godbout	24,215	39.11	-5.88
New Democratic	Mark Leahy	9,339	15.08	+5.01
Green	Sarah Samplonius	2,368	3.82	-0.78
Independent	Alain Saint-Yves	585	0.94	
Total valid votes		61,921	100.00	
Conservative hold		Swing		+3.29

Gloucester, Ontario mayoral election, 1985	Votes	%
Harry Allen	7,390	37.97
Mitch Owens (X)	6,257	32.15
Royal Galipeau	5,814	29.88

Parliament of Canada
Preceded by Marcel Proulx, Liberal	House of Commons Deputy Chair of Committees of the Whole House; 2006-2008	Succeeded by Denise Savoie, NDP
