= Dan Biocchi =

Canadian activist, athlete, & politician (born 1955)

- Born: November 28, 1955 (age 70); Buenos Aires, Argentina
- Education: University of Alberta; McGill University
- Occupations: activist, athlete, politician

Dan Biocchi is a Canadian politician and reserve member of the Canadian 4 × 100 m relay team at the 1976 Olympic Games. He was a candidate in the 2004 Canadian federal election and has advocated for proportional representation and Latin American issues.

Biocchi was born November 28, 1955, in Buenos Aires, Argentina. He emigrated to Montreal, Quebec, in August 1962.

Biocchi received a master's degree in political science from the University of Alberta. He taught political science at McGill University and Marianopolis College in Montreal while working on his doctorate at McGill. He has been a Latin American correspondent with Associated Press.

Biocchi is the founder of the Ottawa chapter of Fair Vote Canada, an organization that lobbies for proportional representation. In the 1980s, he was a member of the Latin American Solidarity Community, assisting Chilean refugees in Canada after escaping the dictatorship of Augusto Pinochet.

Politically, Biocchi was the Green Party of Canada's citizenship and immigration critic during the 2004 federal election, running as their candidate in the riding of Ottawa—Orléans. He placed fourth out of four candidates, with 2,699 votes (4.6% of the total). The winning candidate was the Liberal Party of Canada's Marc Godbout. Biocchi was a candidate in the Cumberland Ward in Ottawa's 2006 municipal election, placing third.
