= Phil McNeely =

Canadian politician

Ontario MPP
- In office 2003–2014
- Preceded by: Brian Coburn
- Succeeded by: Marie-France Lalonde
- Constituency: Ottawa—Orléans

Ottawa City Councillor
- In office 2000–2003
- Preceded by: Robert van den Ham
- Succeeded by: Rob Jellett
- Constituency: Cumberland Ward

Personal details
- Born: 1938 (age 87–88) Cumberland, Ontario, Canada
- Party: Liberal
- Occupation: Business owner, engineer

Philip McNeely is a politician in Ontario, Canada. He was a member of the Legislative Assembly of Ontario, representing the riding of Ottawa—Orléans for the Ontario Liberal Party.

== Background ==
McNeely was born in Cumberland, Ontario and is bilingual. He was educated at Lisgar Collegiate and McGill University, earning a Bachelor of Engineering degree from the latter. He later earned the equivalent of a Master's Degree in engineering from the Imperial College of Science, Technology and Medicine in London. Before entering politics, he was the CEO of McNeely Engineering, a firm which operated in the Ottawa region. He sold this firm in 1997, claiming it had suffered under provincial cutbacks to infrastructure spending.

== Municipal politics ==
In 2000, McNeely was elected as a municipal councillor for the Cumberland Ward of the amalgamated City of Ottawa, defeating incumbent Robert van den Ham. In 2002, he played a key role in the successful Hay West project, in which hay from eastern Canada was shipped to the drought-stricken west. He was also active in opposing the creation of a hog farm in the village of Sarsfield part of the Cumberland Ward of Ottawa.

== Provincial politics ==
In the provincial election of 2003, he defeated incumbent Progressive Conservative Brian Coburn in Ottawa—Orleans by about 4500 votes. He was named a government whip on October 23, 2003.

In July 2006, McNeely described Israel as a "rogue state", arguing that Israel's military campaign in Lebanon was resulting in collective punishment for the Lebanese people. Dalton McGuinty expressed "serious dismay and disappointment" for these remarks, and McNeely later offered an apology for the language of his comments.

He was re-elected to the provincial legislature in 2007, beating Conservative candidate Graham Fox by almost 9,000 votes. In the 2011 election he was re-elected with a margin of 2,854 votes.

In 2005, McNeely proposed an amendment to a no smoking bill that would ban power wall cigarette advertising from convenience stores and retail businesses. The "McNeely Amendment", which came into effect on May 31, 2008, has helped keep cigarettes out of the sight of children.

During his time in office, McNeely has served as Parliamentary Assistant to a number of ministers including Minister of Transportation, Minister of Health and Long Term Care and most recently as PA to the Minister of the Environment.

In 2014, McNeely announced that he would not seek re-election in the 2014 contest.

== Electoral record ==
2011 Ontario general election: Ottawa—Orléans
Party	Candidate	Votes	%	±%	Expenditures
Liberal	Phil McNeely	21,857	46.44	−6.42	$ 86,835.18
Progressive Conservative	Andrew Lister	19,003	40.38	+5.97	57,251.00
New Democratic	Doug McKercher	4,979	10.58	+4.22	1,389.28
Green	Tanya Gutmanis	886	1.88	−2.68	0.00
Freedom	David McGruer	183	0.39	+0.01	0.00
Libertarian	David Paul	154	0.33		82.01
Total valid votes / expense limit		47,062	99.62		$ 106,791.79
Total rejected, unmarked and declined ballots		179	0.38	−0.05	
Turnout		47,241	52.65	−5.21	
Eligible voters		89,726		+6.53	
Liberal hold		Swing		−6.19	
Source(s) "Summary of Valid Votes Cast for Each Candidate – October 6, 2011 General Election" (PDF). Elections Ontario. "Statistical Summary – General Elections 2011" ( XLS Spreadsheet). Elections Ontario. "2011 Candidate Campaign Returns (CR-1)".

2007 Ontario general election: Ottawa—Orléans
Party	Candidate	Votes	%	±%	Expenditures
Liberal	Phil McNeely	25,649	52.86	+2.51	$ 67,961.00
Progressive Conservative	Graham Fox	16,695	34.41	−6.92	81,527.51
New Democratic	Andrée Germain	3,088	6.36	+0.84	1,922.66
Green	Akbar Manoussi	2,214	4.56	+1.77	4,719.58
Family Coalition	Jeremy Atkinson	692	1.43		3,538.98
Freedom	David McGruer	183	0.38		0.00
Total valid votes/expense limit		48,521	99.57		$ 90,965.16
Total rejected ballots		209	0.43	+0.04	
Turnout		48,730	57.86	−5.53	
Eligible voters		84,227		+5.85	
Liberal hold		Swing		+4.71	
Source(s) "Summary of Valid Votes Cast for Each Candidate – October 10, 2007 General Election" (PDF). Elections Ontario. "Statistical Summary – General Elections 2007" (PDF). Elections Ontario. "2007 Candidate Campaign Returns (CR-1)".

2003 Ontario general election: Ottawa—Orléans
Party	Candidate	Votes	%	±%	Expenditures
Liberal	Phil McNeely	25,300	50.36	+9.92	$ 66,785.00
Progressive Conservative	Brian Coburn	20,762	41.32	−13.24	73,997.09
New Democratic	Ric Dagenais	2,778	5.53	+2.85	11,889.14
Green	Melanie Ransom	1,402	2.79	+1.42	1,069.07
Total valid votes/expense limit		50,242	99.61		$ 76,391.04
Total rejected ballots		197	0.39	−0.21	
Turnout		50,439	63.39	+2.52	
Eligible voters		79,574		+11.69	
Liberal gain from Progressive Conservative		Swing		+11.58	
Source(s) "General Election of October 2, 2003 – Summary of Valid Ballots by Candidate". Elections Ontario. "General Election of October 2, 2003 – Statistical Summary". Elections Ontario. "2003 Candidate and Constituency Associations – Candidate Campaign Return (CR-1)".
