= Marc Caron =

Former Canadian soldier

- Born: June 1, 1954 (age 72); Montreal, Quebec, Canada
- Military career
- Allegiance: Canada
- Branch: Canadian Forces
- Rank: Lieutenant General
- Commands: Chief of the Land Staff
- Conflicts: Kosovo War
- Awards: Commander of the Order of Military Merit; Meritorious Service Medal; Canadian Forces' Decoration

Lieutenant-General (Joseph Henri Paul) Marc Caron, CMM, MSM, CD (born June 1, 1954) is a Canadian former soldier. Caron served as an infantry officer and chief of the land staff of the Canadian Forces.

== Early life ==
Caron was born in Montreal, Quebec, Canada, on June 1, 1954. He holds a baccalaureate in Political Science from the University of Ottawa.

== Military career ==
Caron enrolled in the Canadian Forces in October 1971 and after graduating from the Officer Cadet Training Programme, was commissioned in May 1973. As a junior officer he served with the 3rd Battalion, Royal 22^{e} Régiment in Quebec from May 1973, with the 1st Airborne Commando in Cyprus from April 1974, with the 1st Battalion, Royal 22^{e} Régiment in Lahr, Germany from August 1976 and with the Royal Welch Fusiliers in Lemgo, Germany from January 1978. He became a student at the Royal Military College of Science in Shrivenham, England, in 1981, and then at the Canadian Land Force Command and Staff College in Kingston, Ontario in 1982.

Caron became a company commander in the 3rd Battalion, Royal 22^{e} Régiment in Quebec in August 1982 and then became a student at the Canadian Forces Staff College in Toronto, Ontario in 1984. He joined the Project Management Office, Anti-Armour Projects at National Defence Headquarters (NDHQ), in Ottawa in June 1985 before becoming commanding officer of 3rd Battalion, Royal 22^{e} Régiment in Quebec in 1988. He was appointed head of operations staff in the Land Force Command Headquarters in July 1990 before becoming a student at the U.S. Army War College in 1994. He was made director force concepts and director land requirements at NDHQ in July 1994 and then chief of staff of the Kosovo Verification Mission of the Organization for Security and Co-operation in Europe in the Federal Republic of Yugoslavia in November 1998.

Caron was selected to be commander, Land Force Quebec Area, in July 2000, and then assistant chief of the land staff in May 2003. He became acting chief of the land staff in November 2003 and then chief of the land staff in February 2005.

== Retirement ==
He retired from the forces in June 2006 and was succeeded by Lieutenant General Andrew Leslie. Today he works for the Geneva Centre for the Democratic Control of Armed Forces (DCAF), within its International Security Sector Advisory Team (ISSAT).

Military offices
Preceded by Rick Hillier	Chief of the Land Staff; 2005–2006	Succeeded by Andrew Leslie
