= Orléans (federal electoral district) =

Federal electoral district in Ontario, Canada

Coordinates: 45°28′N 75°30′W

Ontario electoral district
- Interactive map of riding boundaries from the 2025 federal election

Federal electoral district
- Legislature: House of Commons
MP
Marie-France Lalonde
Liberal
- District created: 1987
- First contested: 1988
- Last contested: 2021
- District webpage: profile, map

Demographics
- Population (2016): 128,281
- Electors (2015): 94,830
- Area (km²): 211
- Pop. density (per km²): 608
- Census division: Ottawa
- Census subdivision: Ottawa (part)

Orléans (formerly Ottawa—Orléans, Gloucester—Carleton and Carleton—Gloucester) is a federal electoral district in Ottawa, Ontario, Canada, that has been represented in the House of Commons of Canada since 1988.

The riding was created as "Carleton—Gloucester" in 1987. Its name was changed to "Gloucester—Carleton" in 1996, but then changed back to "Carleton–Gloucester" in 1997. It was changed again in 2000 to "Ottawa—Orléans" and to just "Orléans" in 2013.

Despite having an English-speaking majority, Orléans is among the most francophone of the Ontario federal ridings, and a major centre of the Franco-Ontarian community. According to the 2001 Statistics Canada report, 35% of the riding population speaks French as their mother tongue. In recent years, the riding has experienced a major growth of population and increased housing projects.

In the 2004 federal election, the Liberal candidate Marc Godbout won over the Conservative candidate Walter Robinson by over 4% of the votes. Robinson, a former president of the Canadian Taxpayers Federation, was considered a favourite but failed to win support among Francophones. Ottawa—Orléans was also the riding where the NDP had Canada's youngest woman candidate, Crystal LeBlanc, who received 5905 votes in the 2004 federal election.

== Geography ==
It encompasses the suburban community of Orleans in the east end of Ottawa, Ontario (northern and eastern parts of the former city of Gloucester, Ontario plus the northwestern corner of the former city of Cumberland) as well as the neighbourhood of Blackburn Hamlet and the communities of Notre-Dame-des-Champs and Carlsbad Springs.

The riding consists of the part of the City of Ottawa bounded on the north by the Ottawa River, and on the west, south and east by a line drawn due south from the river to the mouth of Green's Creek, south along that creek, southwest along Regional Road 174 to Blair Road, south to Innes Road, west to a transmission line, south to an abandoned Canadian Pacific Railway track, west to Highway 417, southeast to Ramsayville Road, south to Mitch Owens Road, east to Boundary Road, south to Devine Road, east to Frontier Road, north to Carlsbad Lane and its northern production to Tenth Line Road, north to Wall Road, east to Frank Kenny Road, north to Frank Kenny Road, north to the Ottawa River.

== Demographics ==
According to the 2021 Canadian census, 2023 representation order

Racial groups: 66.6% White, 10.8% Black, 5.5% Arab, 5.2% South Asian, 2.8% Indigenous, 2.3% Chinese, 1.4% West Asian, 1.3% Latin American, 1.2% Filipino
Languages: 53.5% English, 33.4% French, 3.7% Arabic, 1.2% Spanish
Religions: 64.5% Christian (43.3% Catholic, 3.3% Anglican, 2.9% United Church, 2.0% Christian Orthodox, 1.5% Pentecostal, 11.7% Other), 8.7% Muslim, 1.3% Hindu, 23.6% No religion
Median income: $54,800 (2020)
Average income: $61,800 (2020)

== History ==
The federal riding was created as "Carleton—Gloucester" in 1987 from parts of Nepean—Carleton and Ottawa—Carleton ridings. It consisted initially of

- the City of Gloucester, excluding these parts:
  - bounded on the north by the City of Ottawa, and on the east, south and west by a line drawn from the boundary south along Conroy Road, west along Davidson Road and Lester Road, south along Albion Road, west along the road allowance between lots 10 and 11, Concession 3, south along the Canadian Pacific Railway line, west along Leitrim Road, north along Limebank Road and River Road to the Ottawa city limit;
  - bounded on the west by the Gloucester city limit, and on the north, east and south by a line drawn east from the limit near Blair Road, south along Blair Road, west along Innes Road, and south along a hydroelectric transmission line situated east of Meadowvale Lane to the western city limit;
- the southeast part of the City of Ottawa lying south of Walkley Road and east of Conroy Road;
- the townships of Osgoode and Rideau;
- the northwest part of the Township of Cumberland lying north of Innes Road and west of Regional Road 57 and Trim Road.

In 1996, it was renamed "Gloucester—Carleton", and defined to consist of

- the City of Gloucester, excluding
  - the part bounded on the north by the City of Ottawa, and on the east, south and west by a line drawn from the border south along Conroy Road, west along Davidson Road and Lester Road, south along the Canadian Pacific Railway, west along Leitrim Road, and north along Limebank Road to the City of Ottawa;
  - the part bounded on the west by the western city limit, and on the north, east and south by a line drawn from the city limit near Mowat Road east to Blair Road, south along Blair Road, west along Innes Road, and south along the transmission line situated east of Meadowvale Lane to the western city limit.
  - the part bounded on the north by the Quebec border, and on the west by the western city limit, and on the north, east and south by a line drawn from the city limit east along Montreal Road and Highway 17, north along Green's Creek and due north to the Quebec boundary.
- the part of the Township of Cumberland west of Trim Road and north of Innes Road.

The name of the electoral district was changed in 1997 back to "Carleton—Gloucester", and in 2000 to "Ottawa—Orléans".

Following the 2012 redistribution of Canada's ridings, the riding lost the neighbourhood of Beacon Hill South from Ottawa—Vanier, and gained the Cardinal Creek area from Glengarry—Prescott—Russell and the rural area surrounding Carlsbad Spring from parts of Glengarry—Prescott—Russell and Nepean—Carleton.

Following the 2022 Canadian federal electoral redistribution, the riding lost Blackburn Hamlet to Ottawa—Vanier—Gloucester. This change came into effect upon the calling of the 2025 Canadian federal election.

== Riding associations ==
Riding associations are the local branches of the national political parties:

Party	Association name	CEO	HQ City
Conservative Party of Canada	Orléans Conservative Association	Rob McCallan	Ottawa
Green Party of Canada	Orléans Green Party Association	Les Schram	Ottawa
Liberal Party of Canada	Orléans Federal Liberal Association	Y. Lee Beauregard	Ottawa
New Democratic Party	Orléans Federal NDP Riding Association	Alexander Kernick	Ottawa

== Members of Parliament ==
Parliament	Years	Member	Party
Carleton—Gloucester; Riding created from Glengarry—Prescott—Russell, Nepean—Carleton and Ottawa—Carleton
34th	1988–1993	Eugène Bellemare	Liberal
35th	1993–1997	Eugène Bellemare	Liberal
36th	1997–2000	Eugène Bellemare	Liberal
Ottawa—Orléans
37th	2000–2004	Eugène Bellemare	Liberal
38th	2004–2006	Marc Godbout	Liberal
39th	2006–2008	Royal Galipeau	Conservative
40th	2008–2011	Royal Galipeau	Conservative
41st	2011–2015	Royal Galipeau	Conservative
Orléans
42nd	2015–2019	Andrew Leslie	Liberal
43rd	2019–2021	Marie-France Lalonde	Liberal
44th	2021–2025	Marie-France Lalonde	Liberal
45th	2025–present	Marie-France Lalonde	Liberal

== Election results ==
Graph of election results in Orléans/Ottawa—Orléans/Carleton—Gloucester (minor parties that never got 2% of the vote or didn't run consistently are omitted) View source data.

=== Orléans ===
2025 Canadian federal election
Party	Candidate	Votes	%	±%
Liberal	Marie-France Lalonde	53,146	67.44	+15.10
Conservative	Steve Mansour	22,072	28.01	–0.66
New Democratic	Oulai B. Goué	2,063	2.63	–11.83
Green	Jaycob Jacques	652	0.83	–0.79
People's	Tafiqul Abu Mohammad	331	0.42	–2.22
Libertarian	Arlo Arrowsmith	301	0.38	N/A
Independent	Mazhar Choudhry	162	0.21	N/A
Independent	Arabella Vida	76	0.10	N/A
Total valid votes/expense limit		78,803	99.31	
Total rejected ballots		548	0.69	-0.17
Turnout		79,351	76.90	+6.05
Eligible voters		103,193		
Liberal notional hold		Swing		+7.88
Source: Elections Canada

2021 federal election redistributed results
Party	Vote	%
Liberal	36,060	52.34
Conservative	19,752	28.67
New Democratic	9,953	14.45
People's	1,818	2.64
Green	1,116	1.62
Free	196	0.28
Total valid votes	68,895	99.14
Rejected ballots	600	0.86
Registered voters/ estimated turnout	98,093	70.85

2021 Canadian federal election
Party	Candidate	Votes	%	±%	Expenditures
Liberal	Marie-France Lalonde	39,101	51.94	-2.33	$110,602.16
Conservative	Mary-Elsie Wolfe	21,700	28.82	+0.59	$42,104.38
New Democratic	Jessica Joanis	10,983	14.59	+3.01	$13,134.25
People's	Spencer Oklobdzija	2,046	2.72	+1.51	$1,993.00
Green	Michael Hartnett	1,233	1.64	-3.06	$0.00
Free	André Junior Cléroux	220	0.29	–	$2.00
Total valid votes/expense limit		–	–	–	$132,099.22
Total rejected ballots					
Turnout					
Eligible voters					
Source: Elections Canada

2019 Canadian federal election
Party	Candidate	Votes	%	±%	Expenditures
Liberal	Marie-France Lalonde	44,183	54.27	-5.41	$111,417.25
Conservative	David Bertschi	22,984	28.23	-2.31	$100,885.58
New Democratic	Jacqui Wiens	9,428	11.58	+3.61	$3,637.15
Green	Michelle Petersen	3,829	4.70	+2.90	none listed
People's	Roger Saint-Fleur	986	1.21	–	none listed
Total valid votes/expense limit		81,410	99.29		
Total rejected ballots		585	0.71	+0.37	
Turnout		81,995	77.12	-3.44	
Eligible voters		106,321			
Liberal hold		Swing		-1.55	
Source: Elections Canada

2015 Canadian federal election
Party	Candidate	Votes	%	±%	Expenditures
Liberal	Andrew Leslie	46,542	59.68	+21.69	$186,398.15
Conservative	Royal Galipeau	23,821	30.54	-14.64	$126,974.94
New Democratic	Nancy Tremblay	6,215	7.97	-6.01	$9,314.72
Green	Raphaël Morin	1,410	1.81	-1.05	$3,260.02
Total valid votes/Expense limit		77,988	99.65		$240,250.25
Total rejected ballots		272	0.35	–	
Turnout		78,260	80.56		
Eligible voters		97,144			
Liberal notional gain from Conservative		Swing		+18.2	

2011 federal election redistributed results
Party	Vote	%
Conservative	28,916	45.18
Liberal	24,307	37.98
New Democratic	8,945	13.98
Green	1,830	2.86
Others	7	0.01

=== Ottawa–Orléans ===
2011 Canadian federal election
Party	Candidate	Votes	%	±%	Expenditures
Conservative	Royal Galipeau	28,584	44.55	-0.29	–
Liberal	David Bertschi	24,649	38.42	-0.32	–
New Democratic	Martine Cenatus	9,086	14.16	+4.06	–
Green	Paul Maillet	1,839	2.87	-3.45	–
Total valid votes/Expense limit		64,158	100.00		
Total rejected ballots		235	0.36	–	
Turnout		64,393	72.76	–	
Eligible voters		88,502	–	–	

2008 Canadian federal election
Party	Candidate	Votes	%	±%	Expenditures
Conservative	Royal Galipeau	27,206	44.84	+3.80	$87,319
Liberal	Marc Godbout	23,504	38.74	-0.37	$86,870
New Democratic	Amy O'Dell	6,127	10.10	-3.98	$1,544
Green	Paul Maillet	3,833	6.32	+2.50	$3,951
Total valid votes/Expense limit		60,670	100.00	$88,543	

2006 Canadian federal election
Party	Candidate	Votes	%	±%
Conservative	Royal Galipeau	25,414	41.04	+0.70
Liberal	Marc Godbout	24,215	39.11	-5.88
New Democratic	Mark Leahy	9,339	15.08	+5.01
Green	Sarah Samplonius	2,368	3.82	-0.78
Independent	Alain Saint-Yves	585	0.94	
Total valid votes		61,921	100.00	

2004 Canadian federal election
Party	Candidate	Votes	%	±%
Liberal	Marc Godbout	26,383	44.99	-6.01
Conservative	Walter Robinson	23,655	40.34	-1.89
New Democratic	Crystal Leblanc	5,905	10.07	+5.92
Green	Dan Biocchi	2,699	4.60	+3.53
Total valid votes		58,642	100.00	

Note: Conservative vote is compared to the total of the Canadian Alliance vote and Progressive Conservative vote in 2000 election.

2000 Canadian federal election
Party	Candidate	Votes	%	±%
Liberal	Eugène Bellemare	26,635	51.00	-7.96
Alliance	Rita Burke	13,316	25.50	+10.88
Progressive Conservative	Marc-André Bélair	8,738	16.73	-2.93
New Democratic	Crystal Leblanc	2,169	4.15	-1.44
Green	Richard Warman	561	1.07	
Marijuana	John Albert	534	1.02	
Natural Law	Heather Hanson	117	0.22	-0.47
Canadian Action	Jean Saintonge	117	0.22	-0.26
Marxist–Leninist	Louis Lang	41	0.08	
Total valid votes		52,228	100.00	

Note: Canadian Alliance vote is compared to the Reform vote in 1997 election.

=== Carleton–Gloucester ===
1997 Canadian federal election
Party	Candidate	Votes	%	±%
Liberal	Eugène Bellemare	29,862	58.96	-2.99
Progressive Conservative	Michel Drapeau	9,960	19.66	+4.47
Reform	Shannon Smith	7,404	14.62	-1.83
New Democratic	Cindy Ignacz	2,831	5.59	+1.90
Natural Law	James Hea	349	0.69	+0.03
Canadian Action	Jean Saintonge	244	0.48	
Total valid votes		50,650	100.00	

1993 Canadian federal election
Party	Candidate	Votes	%	±%
Liberal	Eugène Bellemare	43,212	61.95	+13.83
Reform	Ken Binda	11,474	16.45	
Progressive Conservative	Michel Drapeau	10,598	15.19	-22.10
New Democratic	Cindy Moriarty	2,575	3.69	-5.98
National	Shelley Ann Clark	772	1.11	
Natural Law	James Hea	461	0.66	
Green	Alain Dorion	365	0.52	
Christian Heritage	Judy Thompson	220	0.32	-3.92
Abolitionist	Tom J. Kennedy	80	0.11	
Total valid votes		69,757	100.00	

1988 Canadian federal election
Party	Candidate	Votes	%
Liberal	Eugène Bellemare	30,925	48.12
Progressive Conservative	Maureen McTeer	23,964	37.29
New Democratic	Robert Cottingham	6,217	9.67
Christian Heritage	Terese Ferri	2,728	4.24
Rhinoceros	Peter Francis Godfather Quinlan	435	0.68
Total valid votes		64,269	100.00

== See also ==
- List of Canadian electoral districts
- Historical federal electoral districts of Canada
