= Brian Coburn (politician) =

Canadian politician

The Honourable Brian Coburn ECO

Ontario MPP
- In office 1999–2003
- Preceded by: New riding
- Succeeded by: Phil McNeely
- Constituency: Ottawa—Orléans (Note: The riding was called Carlton—Gloucester in the 1999 election. The name was changed to Ottawa—Orléans in 2000.)

Personal details
- Born: 1945 (age 80–81) Cumberland, Ontario
- Party: Progressive Conservative
- Occupation: Business Owner

Brian Coburn (born c. 1945) is a former politician in Ontario, Canada. He sat in the Legislative Assembly of Ontario from 1999 to 2003, representing the riding of Carleton—Gloucester (renamed as Ottawa—Orléans) for the Progressive Conservative Party. Coburn was a cabinet minister in the government of Mike Harris and Ernie Eves.

He is not to be confused with the person of the same name who represents the same area on the Ottawa-Carleton Catholic School Board.

== Background ==
Coburn was educated at Brock University in St. Catharines. A small businessman, he served for ten years as the Mayor of Cumberland. Coburn also served on the Board of Governors for Algonquin College in Ottawa. As mayor, he earned a reputation for fiscal prudence.

== Politics ==
Coburn was elected for Carleton—Gloucester in the provincial election of 1999, defeating Liberal Ren Danis by over 6,000 votes. This was considered a major upset. The riding had been solidly Liberal for many years, and most observers thought Danis would win an easy victory. Coburn's win may be attributed to personal popularity and a local issue: many residents saw construction workers from Quebec as a threat to local employment, and voted Tory to protest the situation.

After sitting as a backbencher for two years, Coburn was appointed to the government of Mike Harris as Minister of Agriculture, Food and Rural Affairs on February 8, 2001.

In 2002, Coburn endorsed Ernie Eves to succeed Mike Harris as leader of the Progressive Conservative Party. When Eves became Premier on April 15, 2002, he named Coburn Associate Minister of Municipal Affairs and Housing with Responsibility for Rural Affairs. On February 25, 2003, Coburn was moved to the Minister of Tourism and Recreation.

Coburn carried the banner of an increasingly unpopular party into the 2003 provincial election. The presence of Quebec workers was no longer an issue, and many local residents were angered by increased energy rates under the Harris and Eves governments. Despite gaining endorsements from several local newspapers, Coburn lost to Liberal Phil McNeely, another municipal politician, by about 4,500 votes.

In 2004, he endorsed Frank Klees for the leadership of the Ontario PC Party.

=== Cabinet positions ===
Eves ministry, Province of Ontario (2002–2003)
Cabinet posts (2)
Predecessor	Office	Successor
Cam Jackson	Minister of Tourism and Recreation; 2003 (February–October)	Jim Bradley
New position	Associate Minister of Municipal Affairs and Housing; 2002-2003; Also Responsible for Rural Affairs	Ernie Hardeman
Harris ministry, Province of Ontario (1995–2002)
Cabinet post (1)
Predecessor	Office	Successor
Noble Villeneuve	Minister of Agriculture and Food; 2001-2002	Helen Johns

== Electoral record ==
2003 Ontario general election: Ottawa—Orléans
Party	Candidate	Votes	%	±%	Expenditures
Liberal	Phil McNeely	25,300	50.36	+9.92	$ 66,785.00
Progressive Conservative	Brian Coburn	20,762	41.32	−13.24	73,997.09
New Democratic	Ric Dagenais	2,778	5.53	+2.85	11,889.14
Green	Melanie Ransom	1,402	2.79	+1.42	1,069.07
Total valid votes/expense limit		50,242	99.61		$ 76,391.04
Total rejected ballots		197	0.39	−0.21	
Turnout		50,439	63.39	+2.52	
Eligible voters		79,574		+11.69	
Liberal gain from Progressive Conservative		Swing		+11.58	
Source(s) "General Election of October 2, 2003 – Summary of Valid Ballots by Candidate". Elections Ontario. "General Election of October 2, 2003 – Statistical Summary". Elections Ontario. "2003 Candidate and Constituency Associations – Candidate Campaign Return (CR-1)".

1999 Ontario general election: Ottawa—Orléans (Note: During the June 1999 election, this electoral district was also known as “Carleton—Gloucester”)
Party	Candidate	Votes	%	Expenditures
Progressive Conservative	Brian Coburn	24,356	54.56	$ 32,653.11
Liberal	René Danis	18,052	40.44	29,722.53
New Democratic	Jamie Gallant	1,195	2.68	Unavailable
Green	André Clermont	614	1.38	212.00
Independent	Luc Brisebois	247	0.55	0.00
Natural Law	Richard Wolfson	177	0.40	0.00
Total valid votes/expense limit		44,641	99.40	$ 70,837.44
Total rejected ballots		270	0.60	
Turnout		44,911	60.86	
Eligible voters		73,789		
Source(s) "General Election of June 3 1999 — Summary of Valid Ballots by Candidate". Elections Ontario. "General Election of June 3 1999 — Statistical Summary". Elections Ontario. "1999 Election and Annual Returns - Candidate and Constituency Association Returns".

== Later life ==
Coburn was appointed as a Citizenship Judge for Ottawa, Ontario in October 2006. Brian Coburn Boulevard, an arterial road in Orleans, is named after him.
