= Andrew Leslie (Canadian Army officer) =

Canadian politician

Lieutenant-General the Honourable Andrew Leslie PC CMM MSC MSM CD
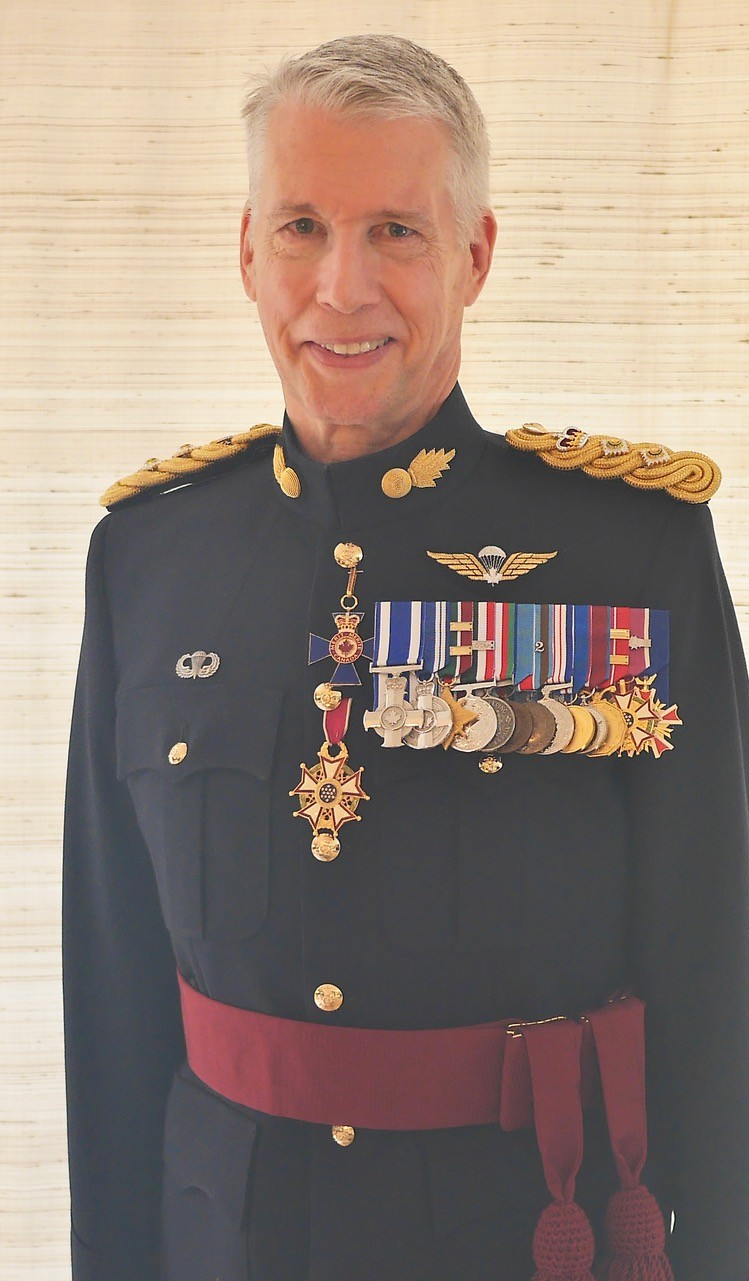
- Lt-Gen Leslie in 2025

Chief Government Whip
- In office November 20, 2015 – January 29, 2017
- Prime Minister: Justin Trudeau
- Preceded by: John Duncan
- Succeeded by: Pablo Rodriguez

Member of Parliament for Orléans
- In office October 19, 2015 – September 11, 2019
- Preceded by: Royal Galipeau
- Succeeded by: Marie-France Lalonde

Chief of the Land Staff
- In office June 2006 – June 2010
- Preceded by: Marc Caron
- Succeeded by: Peter Devlin

Personal details
- Born: Andrew Brooke Leslie; December 26, 1957 (age 68) Ottawa, Ontario, Canada
- Party: Liberal
- Spouse: Paris Jefferson
- Awards: Commander of the Order of Military Merit; Meritorious Service Cross; Meritorious Service Medal; Canadian Forces' Decoration; Commander of the Legion of Merit (United States); Commander's Cross of the Order of Merit of the Republic of Poland

Military service
- Allegiance: Canada
- Branch/service: Land Force Command
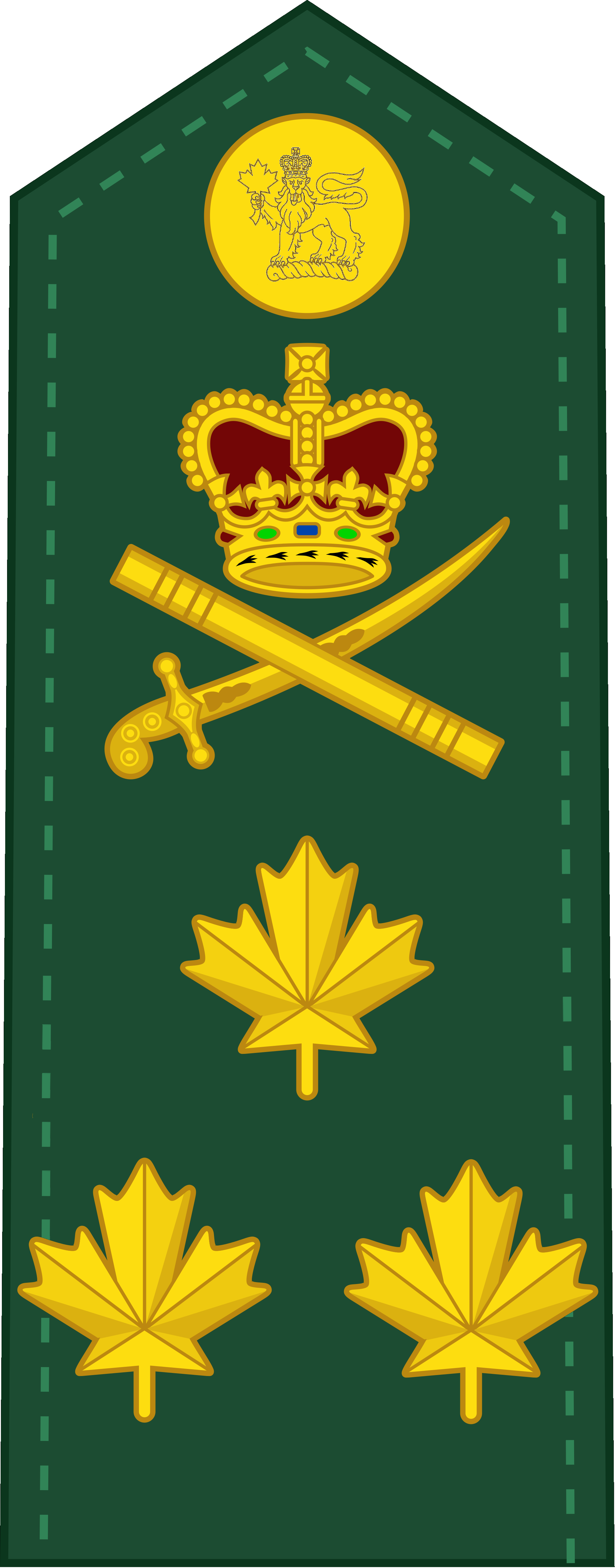
- Rank: Lieutenant-general
- Commands: Troop Commander E (para); Commander A Battery 1 Royal Canadian Horse Artillery; Regimental Commander 1 Royal Canadian Horse Artillery; Chief of Staff UNCRO Sector South; 1 Canadian Mechanized Brigade Group; Communications Command and National J6; 4th Canadian Division; Deputy Commander ISAF Afghanistan; Commander of Task Force Kabul; Commander of the Canadian Army and Chief of the Land Staff; Chief of Transformation
- Battles/wars: War in Afghanistan

Andrew Brooke Leslie PC CMM MSC MSM CD (born December 26, 1957) is a retired Canadian Forces Lieutenant-General and politician who served as the Chief of the Land Staff from 2006 to 2010 and as a Member of Parliament representing the riding of Orléans in the House of Commons, from 2015 until 2019.

== Background ==
Born at Ottawa in 1957, his father was Brigadier-General Edward Murray Dalziel Leslie (né McNaughton), Commander of 1st Regiment, Royal Canadian Horse Artillery (1 RCHA) during the Korean War. Leslie's father changed the family name from McNaughton to Leslie in compliance with the terms of an inheritance from his aunt (and wife of James Norman Stuart Leslie, descended from British Army Captain James Norman Stewart Leslie and General David Leslie). His paternal grandfather was former Chief of the General Staff and Minister of National Defence General Andrew McNaughton, and his maternal grandfather was former Canadian Minister of National Defence Brooke Claxton.

== Military career ==
Leslie joined the 30th Field Regiment whilst at the University of Ottawa. As a graduate student in London, he was attached to the Honourable Artillery Company, before transferring to the Regular Force in 1981. He went on to be commanding officer of 1st Regiment, Royal Canadian Horse Artillery in Shilo, Manitoba.

=== Yugoslavia ===
In 1995, Leslie was promoted colonel and posted to Yugoslavia as Chief of Staff for Sector South. He then became the chief of staff and deputy commander of United Nations Confidence Restoration Operation in Croatia. During the attack of the Croatian forces on the Serbian-held Krajina region, he was credited with leading an operation which resulted in saving the lives of 40 civilians.

=== Brigade ===
Leslie was the Area Chief of Staff during the Manitoba floods disaster assistance efforts in Spring 1997. Later that year, he became commander of 1 Canadian Mechanized Brigade Group based across Western Canada. In early 1998, the Brigade Group (reinforced) deployed to the South shore of Montreal to help with the ice storm disaster, and then continued with a series of Battle Group and Brigade Exercises.

=== Communications and division command ===
While participating in both the Advanced Military Studies and the National Military Studies programs in Toronto, Leslie was promoted to brigadier-general in 1999. Later appointed as the J6 of the Canadian Forces, he commanded the Regular and Reserve communications and Electronic Warfare regiments and was responsible for the networks operations center and classified communications research establishments. In 2002 he was promoted commander of Land Force Central Area, later renamed the 4th Canadian Division, responsible for one Regular and three Reserve Brigades, and various supporting bases. He led the detailed mission reconnaissance in Afghanistan while the Canadian government considered options as to a 9/11 response.

=== Afghanistan ===
As of July 2003, Leslie was promoted to major-general and subsequently appointed commander of Land Force Doctrine and Training System. In August 2003, he was appointed deputy commander of the International Security Assistance Force in Afghanistan, which would later become a NATO mission, working under a United Nations Chapter 7 mandate. He was double hatted the commander of Task Force Kabul. Leslie led the mission efforts which focused on stability, counter insurgency, and counter-terrorism operations, during which many hundreds of tanks, rocket launchers and heavy artillery were taken away from various warlords. Upon his return to Canada, Leslie was awarded the Meritorious Service Cross.

Leslie was then appointed assistant chief of the Land Staff in 2004, and shortly afterwards became the director general of strategic planning at National Defense Headquarters in Ottawa. In June 2006, he was appointed Chief of the Land Staff.

=== Chief of transformation ===
In June 2010, General Leslie was succeeded by Lieutenant-General Peter Devlin as chief of Land Staff being appointed Chief of Transformation for the Canadian Forces. In this position, Leslie was responsible for releasing the 2011 Report on Transformation, which, among other changes, recommended significantly cutting headquarters' budgets and transferring the funds to front line combat units. Leslie referred to this as transforming the Forces into "more tooth and less tail," a phrase that was used by Prime Minister Stephen Harper and Minister of National Defence Peter MacKay. Some saw Leslie's report as recommending to sacrifice too many sacred cows, namely the bloated headquarters organizations.

=== Retirement ===
Leslie retired in September 2011 after 35 years in uniform and was subsequently hired by CGI Group to lead their new Defence, Public Safety and Intelligence unit in Ottawa.

== Post-military career ==
Before officially retiring from military service, Leslie was approached by several members of the Prime Minister's Office to inquire about whether he was interested in heading a federal department or organization. These included discussions with Prime Minister Harper's Deputy Chiefs of Staff Derek Vanstone and Jenni Byrne about heading the Canadian Museum of Civilization. After Leslie retired from the Army he was approached again, this time about heading the Royal Canadian Mounted Police. Leslie declined.

=== Liberal advisor and candidacy ===
On September 18, 2013, Leslie was named co-chairman of the Liberal International Affairs Council of Advisors, providing advice on foreign and defence issues to Liberal Party of Canada leader Justin Trudeau. Leslie then ran as the Liberal parliamentary candidate in the 2015 general election for the riding of Orléans. He was elected the Member of Parliament for Orléans in the 2015 election ahead of Conservative incumbent Royal Galipeau.

== Member of Parliament ==
Leslie was elected to the House of Commons of Canada as an MP and on November 20, 2015, he was named Chief Government Whip in the Commons. On February 15, 2016, as Chief Government Whip Leslie was sworn of the Queen's Privy Council for Canada.

On May 1, 2019, Leslie retired from politics by not seeking re-election in the federal election. On May 3, 2019, Leslie confirmed that he would be testifying for the defence at Vice-Admiral Mark Norman's breach of trust trial. On May 7, 2019, the Canadian Broadcasting Corporation reported that Canada's Public Prosecution Service planned to withdraw charges against Norman.

== Personal life ==
On August 27, 2022, Leslie married actress Paris Jefferson.

== Honours and decorations ==
Leslie has been awarded the following honours and decorations during and after his military career:

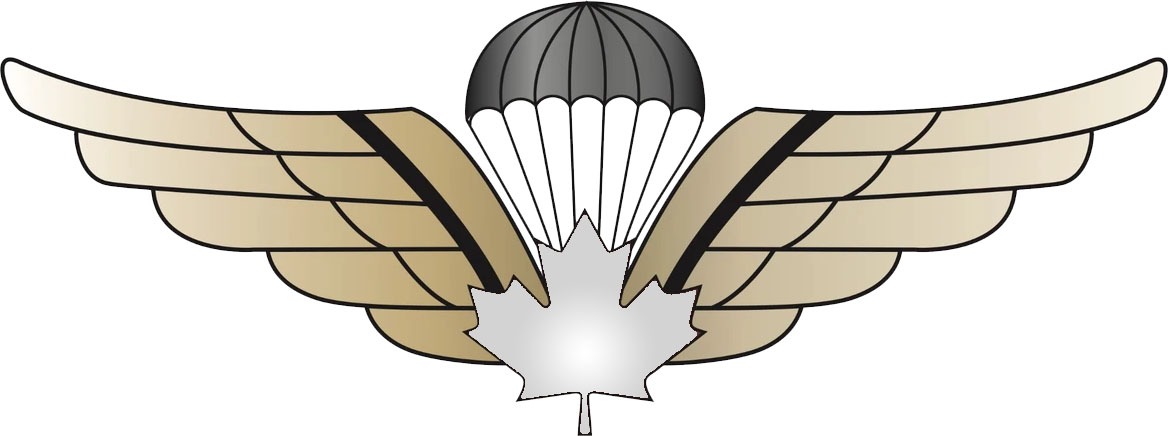

Ribbon	Description	Notes
	Order of Military Merit (CMM)	Commander 21 September 2006; Officer 28 October 1998
	Meritorious Service Cross (MSC)	Awarded 2004 (Military Division)
	Meritorious Service Medal (MSM)	Awarded 1995 (Military Division)
	General Campaign Star	South West Asia Ribbon; With "ISAF" Bar
	Special Service Medal	With "NATO" Bar
	Canadian Peacekeeping Service Medal	2000
	UNFICYP	90 days' service UN Peacekeeping Mission in Cyprus
	UNPROFOR	90 days' service UN Peacekeeping Force during the Yugoslav Wars
	125th Anniversary of the Confederation of Canada Medal	1992
	Queen Elizabeth II Golden Jubilee Medal	2002 (Canadian Version)
	Queen Elizabeth II Diamond Jubilee Medal	2012 (Canadian Version)
	Canadian Forces' Decoration (CD)	With 2 Clasps
	Legion of Merit	Commander, appointed in 2007 by the United States of America
	Order of Merit of the Republic of Poland	3rd Class (Commander's Cross), awarded in 2010 by the Republic of Poland

- During his military career Andrew Leslie also served as an aide-de-camp;
- As a paratrooper, Leslie can wear the Canadian Forces Jump Wings.

== Electoral history ==
2015 Canadian federal election: Orléans
Party	Candidate	Votes	%	±%	Expenditures
Liberal	Andrew Leslie	46,542	59.7	+21.72	–
Conservative	Royal Galipeau	23,821	30.5	-14.68	–
New Democratic	Nancy Tremblay	6,215	8.0	-5.98	–
Green	Raphaël Morin	1,410	1.8	-1.06	–
Total valid votes/Expense limit		77,988	100		$240,250.25
Total rejected ballots		272	0.30	–	
Turnout		78,260	81.37	–	
Eligible voters		96,174	–	–	
Liberal notional gain from Conservative		Swing		+18.2	

== See also ==
- Clan Leslie

Military offices
Preceded by Marc Caron	Chief of the Land Staff; 2006–2010	Succeeded by Peter Devlin
Special Parliamentary Responsibilities
Predecessor	Title	Successor
John Duncan	Chief Government Whip; 2015–2017	Pablo Rodriguez
