= Hay West =

Hay West was a Canadian logistic operation in 2002 to move approximately 30 kilotonnes of hay from Eastern Canada to Western Canada, in an attempt to prevent western Canadian herd starvation of livestock due to drought. The term can also refer to the common continuing brand/organization that organized hay transport in subsequent drought years.

== Background ==
Much of the farmland in Alberta is unsuitable for raising most cash crops, and is instead operated as grazeland, leading Alberta to be the leader in Canadian beef cattle production.

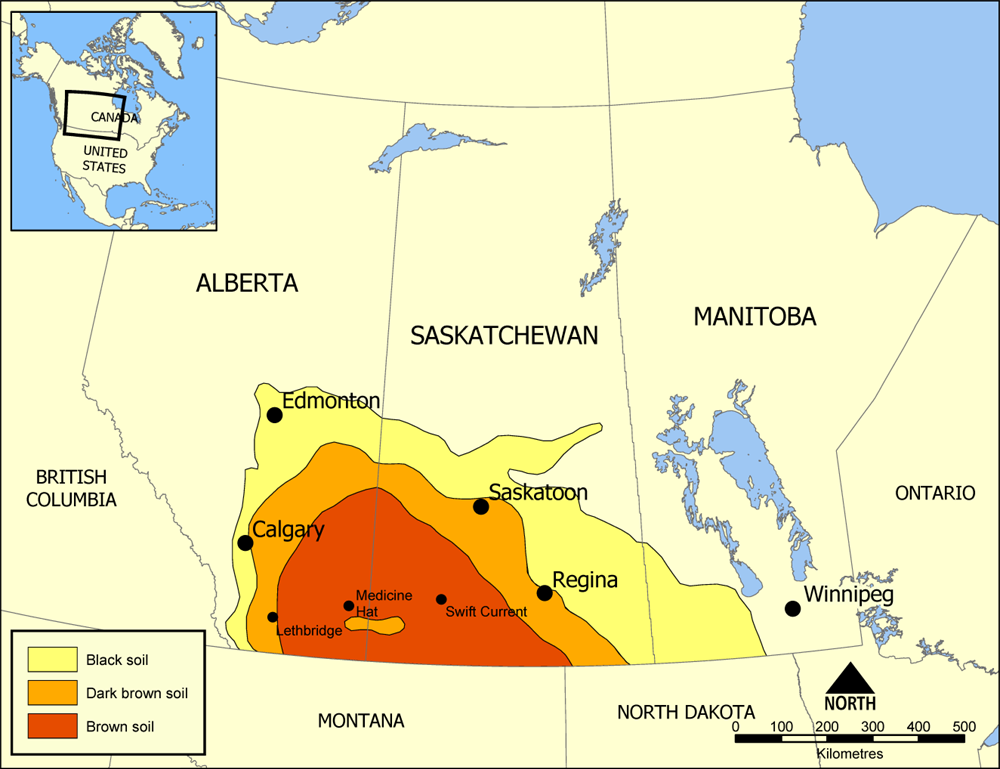
Palliser's triangle, showing the drought proclivity of Canadian prairie provinces.

Droughts are a relatively common occurrence in both the prairie and boreal zones that encompass much of Alberta, and much of Saskatchewan and Alberta lie within Palliser's Triangle. Previous droughts had led to stresses on herds of cattle and subsequently on the financial interests of farmers and ranchers who kept cattle. Crop assistance during a 1970 drought was delivered through coupons (grants) to allow farmers to purchase hay from outside the area, and generally failed, with many farmers selling cattle due to being unable to feed them. While feed can be moved between Canadian provinces, and had been in previous droughts, the size of Canada creates difficulty in doing so.

Canada does have a system of crop insurance, but at the time the main system was predicated on farmers having previously invested enough money to later withdraw, and required proof of loss of income prior to withdrawal.

Also relevant to the conversation, Hay West scholar Bob Plamondon says, is the state of animosity between Western toward Eastern Canada following the failed attempt of Prime Minister Pierre Elliott Trudeau to implement the National Energy Program.

== Drought in Alberta ==
In 2002, precipitation in Alberta and Saskatchewan were the lowest seen since the 1930s, and reaching record lows in east-central Alberta, portrayed by Environment Canada as a "once in 200-year event". In many locations, annual precipitation was lower than 60% of the local average. The drought was an intensification of a multi-year drought that started in 1999, but was not characterized by extreme heat. 2001, the year before had already seen a bad drought, leading to a decrease in hay reserves.

The drought threatened ranchers' and farmers' ability to feed cattle, which are numerous in Alberta. Many farmers were not able to get a usual first cut of hay, and though hay quality was rated as good, shortages of hay led many farmers to graze cattle directly on hay-producing land, a short-term solution. Many farmers also responded to shortages in early hay and drought conditions by turning existing non-grazing crops to silage.

== Organization of Hay West ==
On the morning July 17, 2002, a partially-sighted farmer from Navan, Ontario, Willard McWilliams, had been watching an episode of Canada AM that spoke about the issue of shortages of hay. The City of Ottawa, in whose urban boundary Navan's farm lied, had excellent hay-growing conditions that year, with above-average rainfall. As a result, Willard had a surplus of hay stores, including full indoor storage facilities, and extra hay growing in his field, and he categorized it as a surplus of what they would need for the year. McWilliams believed that a mass distribution of donated hay from similarly strong hay crops of other farmers in and beyond Ottawa was possible if logistics allowed for it, believing that rail was the main economical option. However, McWilliams was dubious about the prospect of being able to get free transport for the donated hay.

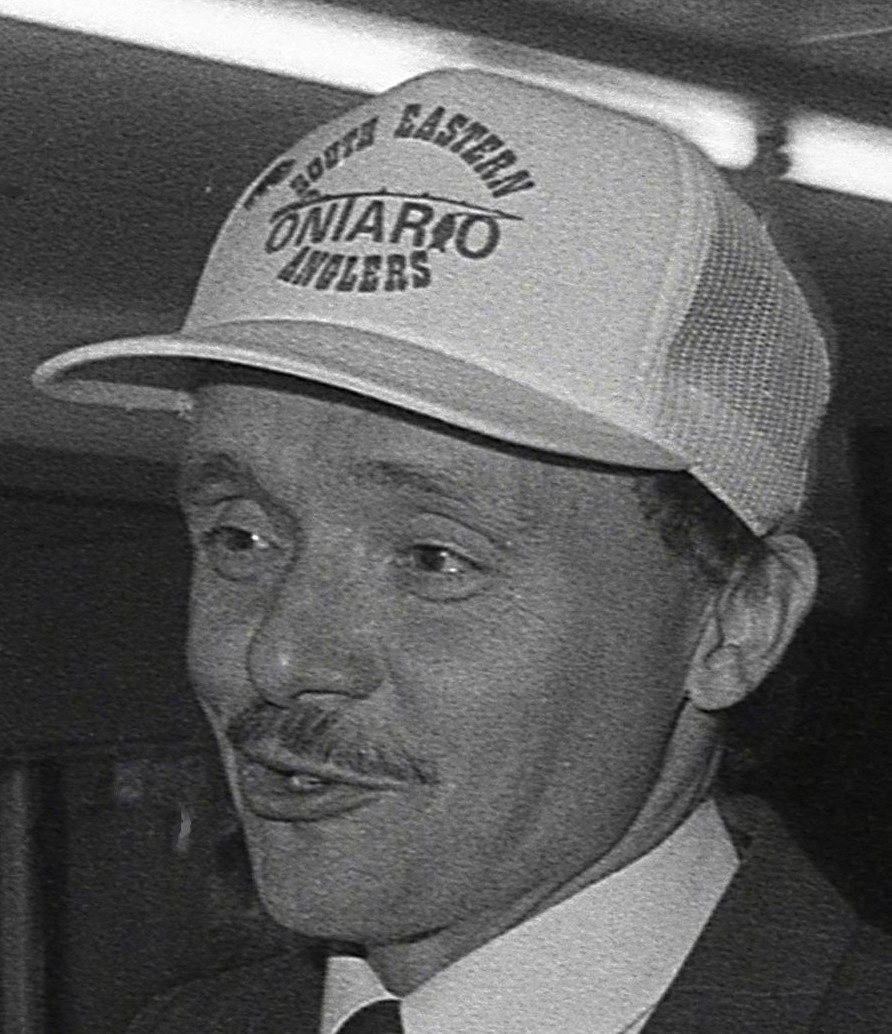
Don Boudria, Canadian MP and cabinet minister, who took a leading political role in Hay West.

McWilliams contacted his local city councillor, Phil McNeely, who decided to immediately contact the local member of parliament, Leader of the Government in the House of Commons, Don Boudria. Boudria, realizing that the president of CN Rail was the former Clerk of the Privy Council Paul Tellier, got in touch within the same morning, asking for rail capacity. Tellier was receptive and asked for an estimate of capacity. Boudria provided an estimate of 10 railcars, to which Tellier agreed.

Ottawa media, including radio station CFRA, quickly publicized the news story, yielding immediate positive reactions throughout the local area. McWilliams' wife was not present at the time and was reportedly surprised to see her husband appear on a CBC Television interview.

Boudria hosted a meeting in Centre Block two days later, on July 19, convening McWilliams, Agriculture Canada civil servants, CN representatives, and others. The plan was initially made for loading at the CN rail yard near Brockville.

McNeely and his executive assistant, Rob Jellett, then named the effort Hay West, putting out a press release to disseminate information about the drop-off point. The logo of Hay West was designed by McWilliams's daughter, Wanda, and was designed to be easy to put on a hat, a request of McWilliams's son Wyatt.

While Hay West was not a charitable organization, the Canadian Federation of Humane Societies acted as an unofficial receiving agent for donations and disbursements and issued tax receipts, without a formal agreement with Hay West's unincorporated leadership, and taking a 5% overhead until Hay West incorporated.

== Execution of Hay West ==
=== Collection and packaging ===
Boudria continued to play a major role in Hay West, reportedly having daily time dedicated to it.

An overall manager of operations was brought in, Pierre Brodeur, a former farmer, mayor and Bell Canada executive. Pierre arranged for a surplus government office in order to coordinate the response, and the first loading of hay onto a combination of boxcars and flatbeds within a week. Loading of the cars was bespoke depending on traincar configuration and bale size.

A hay donor and Eastern Ontario cattle farmer, Cathy Willoughby, was brought in to serve as donation coordinator, due to her contacts within the Ontario Federation of Agriculture. She worked full-time for three months in the Hay West government office fielding calls, coordinating deliveries and tracking hay pledges, as well as fielding calls from farmers, including distraught farmers, from the West waiting on deliveries, as well as complaints from western Canadian hay brokers. The addition of pledges allowed for the planning of multiple Hay West shipments throughout the many months of the haying season.

The loading appeared to have occurred with minimal incident. The original hope of filling 10 railcars was eclipsed within the first few days of loading, with 30 cars being loaded instead. There were no controls on individuals delivering, so the amount of supply was initially unknown.

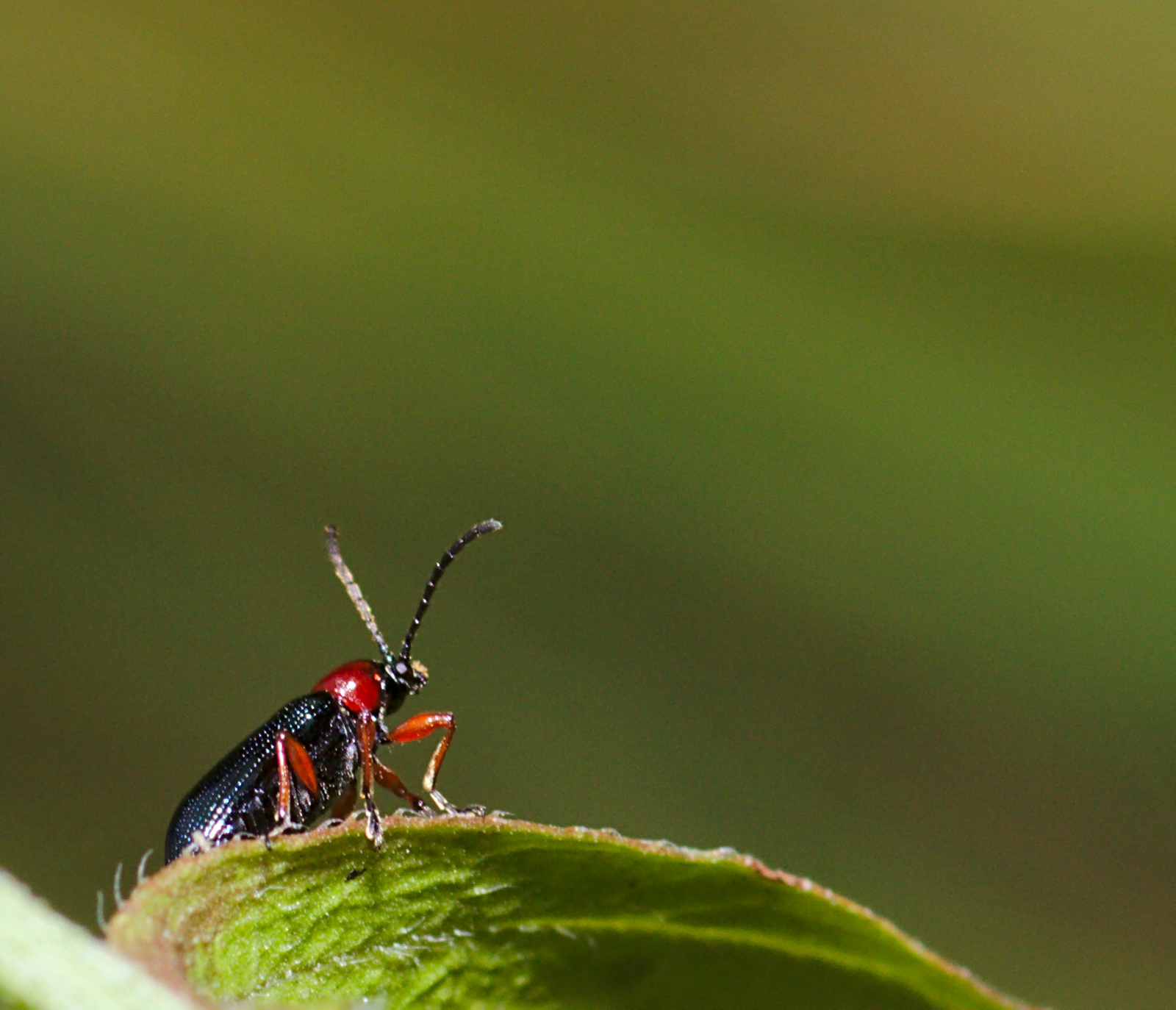
Cereal Leaf Beetle, which did not derail Hay West after a quick fumigation fix.

One major issue that arose before the hay was loaded, which were previously unidentified biocontrol risks related to the cereal leaf beetle, which required fumigation of the bales. At the July 19th meeting, Agriculture and Agri-Food Canada had failed to identify the issue, and they had affirmed the "green light" to transport on the 22nd. At the time on the 24th that this information was made available to organizers, 27 loads of hay had been loaded. This news became public, causing public backlash against the Canada Food Inspection Agency, the organisation responsible for enforcing the biocontrols. The issue was remedied through an immediate sole-sourced contract to an Ottawa a firm to fumigate the railcars. The delay in shipment amounted to one day, with the train leaving on the 26th instead of the intended 25th. Barriers to fumigation included lack of large size tarps appropriate for the large size of the railcars. Effectiveness of the fumigation was confirmed by introducing live beetles into the cars to later check. Fumigation costs amounted to approximately half a million 2002 Canadian dollars

Donations were made and coordinated from other provinces and directed to one of 24 loading stations, with every eastern Canadian province except rail-isolated Newfoundland taking part. Ontario provided approximately two-thirds of overall hay donations, with the other provinces contributing the remaining third. The Government of Canada donated 1,100 bales of hay grown on the experimental farm.

The estimated value of the donated hay was $6 million.

=== Transportation ===
Dave Cameron was brought in by Hay West managed Pierre Brodeur to coordinate rail shipments, keeping track of corporate sponsored railcar space and attempting to accurately assess capacity to deliver hay effectively. The federal government eventually sponsored approximately half of the 711 carloads used during the multi-month Hay West delivery schedule.

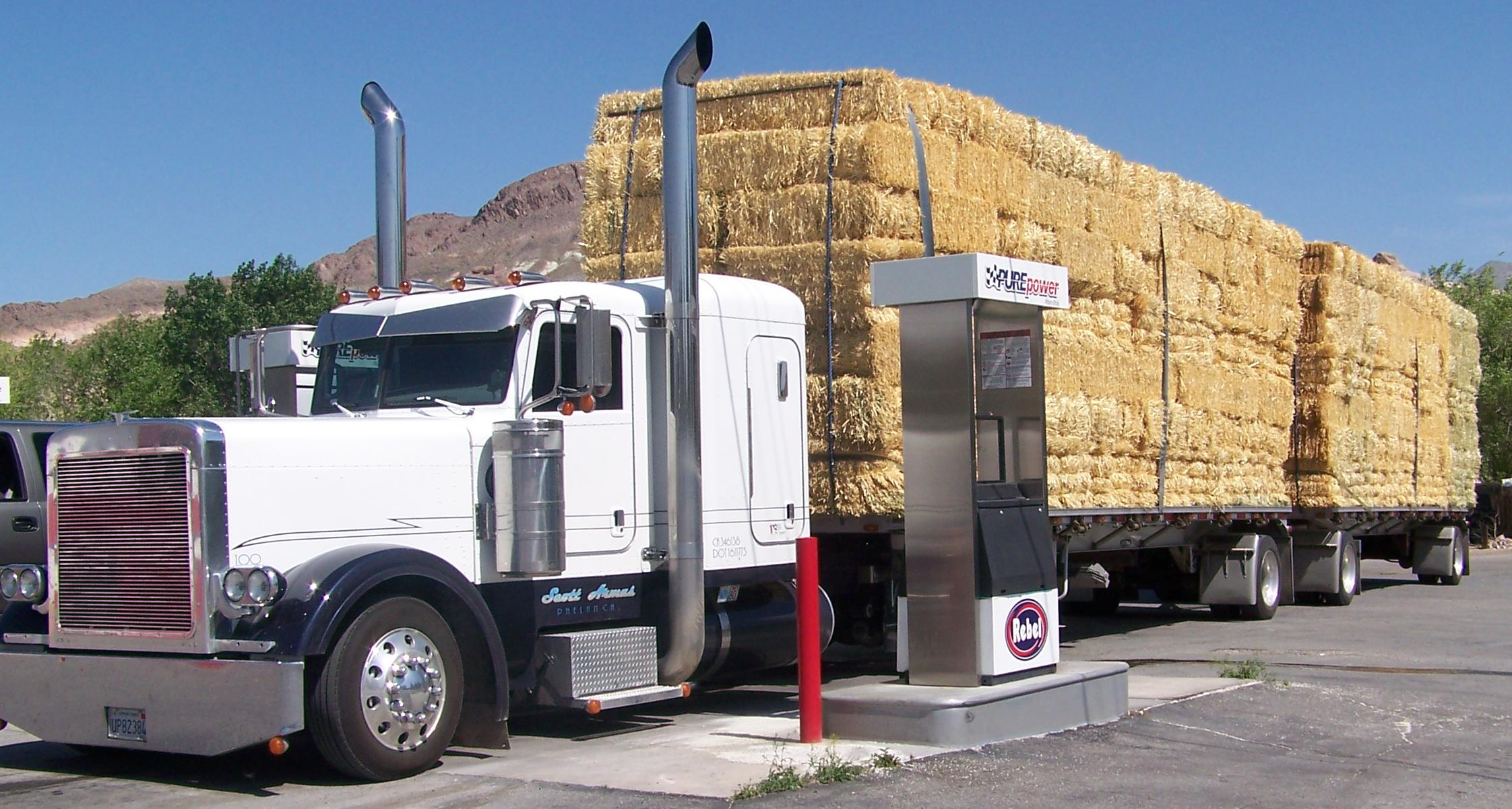
Ultimately, almost 20% of hay was transported by tractor-trailer. (Photo of hay truck not from Hay West)

Trucking was also investigated as an opportunity to get more hay west. Some trucks delivering products from the West to the East, and returning empty, were negotiated with to get favourable pricing on transport. Transport trucks contributed to less than 20% of all hay shipments.

=== Allocation ===
Myron Thomson, an opposition Albertan MP, suggested to Boudria that he could contribute by helping coordinate distribution logistics within Alberta, and brought in fellow Alberta MP and farmer Kevin Sorensen, who also brought in Saskatchewan MP Carol Skelton to develop distribution networks within Saskatchewan. Skelton later brought in Nikky Smith of the Saskatchewan Cattle Feeders Association as well. Calls to the distribution offices necessitated the addition of extra phone lines, with one line insufficient to handle the work, and leading to the addition of three full-time volunteers to handle call traffic. Distribution allocations of hay was conducted by lottery, with an Alberta exclusion of relatives of Kevin Sorenson. In Saskatchewan, names were checked against drought-ridden areas, and the lottery was managed by a public accounting firm. In Alberta, distribution was done by the Alberta Cattle Commission, and done by lottery, with slips of paper drawn from a rotating drum in Camrose, and covered by radio for the benefit of farmers not in attendance. The amount of hay to be transported was noted by Sorensen to be lower than what was needed. The transportation of hay amounted to only approximately 10% of the shortfall of Western hay.

Distribution in Alberta was limited to those with over 15 feeder animals, and involved a pledge to not sell the hay, though recipients could donate surplus to other farmers free of cost.

=== Distribution ===
In Alberta, the 4-H was tasked with managing the distribution of allocated bales.

In Saskatchewan, distribution was managed through the Saskatchewan Cattle Feeders Association.

A major unanticipated difficulty was the scale of deliveries, driving the anticipated timetable of deliveries from originally one shipment to months of shipments, and reliance on a volunteer system. The federal government ultimately contributed funding to help support the logistics effort for distribution.

== Impact ==
=== Farmer gratitude and impacts ===
Of the recipients of the hay, many chose to express gratitude to Hay West through proving letters and cards.

Farmers expressed that they did not need to cull their entire herds and that they felt a nationwide affinity to other farmers.

The 4-H, whose Canadian equivalent was responsible for much of the distribution in the province of Alberta

=== Public legacy ===
The project received hundreds of interviews, prompted support from western city councils, and fostered a sense of bonhomie between the West and the East. Some letters sent to Hay West in gratitude were group letters, including one signed by 3,000 members of Wainwright, Saskatchewan.

Prime Minister Jean Chrétien deemed it "an illustration of the strength and generosity of human spirit" for Plamondon's book, Premier of Alberta Ralph Klein termed it as being illustrative of what it means to be a Canadian, and Lorne Calbert, Premier of Saskatchewan termed it as a "national rallying point".

=== Controversy ===
The effort was not met with universal acclaim, with some western Canadian media editorials highlighting that Hay West's energy may have been better served agitating for more generous disaster support by the federal government to Western farmers.

Joe Clark, then leader of the Progressive Conservative Party decried the federal government's support of Hay West and the $600 million in existing supports as insufficient.

Saskatchewan MP Dick Proctor claimed that farmers in the East tended to get better disaster relief.

Other opposition politicians such as Peter McKay and Stephen Harper were more optimistic about the national symbolism of Hay West.

A government Senator, Herb Sparrow, was critical of the political feel-goodedness of the effort and the average cost involved in transporting hay, to which Hay West manager Pierre Brodeur publicly criticized.

== Replication ==
In some cases, hay has been sent west or east again when drought has struck, under the label "Hay West" or "Hay East" such as from the west to Ontario in 2012 to 2013, or hay being sent west in 2021.
