= Orléans (provincial electoral district) =

Provincial electoral district in Ontario, Canada

Coordinates: 45°28′N 75°30′W

Carleton—Gloucester (1999–2000) Ottawa—Orléans (2000–2018) Orléans (2018–present)
Ontario electoral district
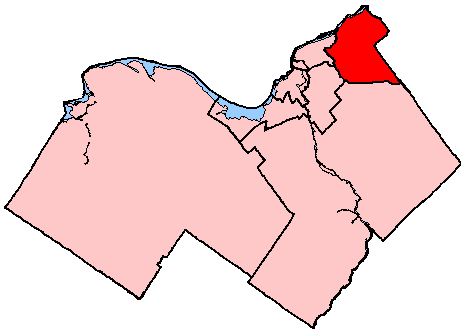
- Orléans in relation to other Ottawa electoral districts

Provincial electoral district
- Legislature: Legislative Assembly of Ontario
MPP
Stephen Blais
Liberal
- District created: 1999
- First contested: 1999
- Last contested: 2025

Demographics
- Population (2016): 128,280
- Electors (2020): 110,811
- Area (km²): 211
- Pop. density (per km²): 608
- Census division(s): Ottawa (2001–present); Ottawa-Carleton Regional Municipality (1999–2001)
- Census subdivision(s): Ottawa (2001–present); Cumberland (1999–2001); Gloucester (1999–2001)

Orléans is a provincial electoral district in Eastern Ontario, Canada. It elects one member to the Legislative Assembly of Ontario. Before the 2018 election, it was known as Ottawa—Orléans.

== History ==
It was created in 1999 from Prescott and Russell, Carleton East and Ottawa—Rideau. The electoral district was initially named Carleton—Gloucester, and the June 1999 provincial election was conducted by Elections Ontario under that name, but it was known as Ottawa—Orleans by the time of the October 2003 provincial election.

When it was created, the riding consisted of that part of the former city of Gloucester south of a line following Limebank Road to Leitrim Road to the Canadian Pacific Railway to Lester Road to Conroy Road, and east of a line following Green's Creek to the Queensway to Montreal Road to Blair Road to Innes Road to a transmission line and that part of the city of Cumberland north of Innes Road and west of Trim Road.

For the 2007 election, the riding was redefined to consist of that part of Ottawa within a line running along Green's Creek to the Queensway to Montreal Road to Blair Road to Innes Road to a transmission line to Highway 417 to Boundary Road to Wall Road to Trim Road to Regional Road 174 to Cardinal Creek.

For the 2018 election, the riding was renamed Orléans, and lost the neighbourhood of Beacon Hill South from Ottawa—Vanier, and will gain the Cardinal Creek area from Glengarry—Prescott—Russell and the rural area surrounding Carlsbad Spring from parts of Glengarry—Prescott—Russell and Nepean—Carleton.

== Members of Provincial Parliament ==
Assembly	Years	Member	Party
Carleton—Gloucester; Riding created from Prescott and Russell, Carleton East and Ottawa—Rideau
37th	1999–2003	Brian Coburn	Progressive Conservative
Ottawa—Orléans
38th	2003–2007	Phil McNeely	Liberal
39th	2007–2011	Phil McNeely	Liberal
40th	2011–2014	Phil McNeely	Liberal
41st	2014–2018	Marie-France Lalonde	Liberal
Orléans
42nd	2018–2019	Marie-France Lalonde	Liberal
42nd	2020–2022	Stephen Blais	Liberal
43rd	2022–present	Stephen Blais	Liberal

== Election results ==
Winning party in each polling division of Orléans at the 2025 Ontario general election

2025 Ontario general election
Party	Candidate	Votes	%	±%
Liberal	Stephen Blais	30,482	54.18	+7.92
Progressive Conservative	Stéphan Plourde	19,868	35.31	+2.66
New Democratic	Matthew Sévigny	3,378	6.00	–7.79
Green	Michelle Petersen	1,398	2.48	–2.07
New Blue	Patricia Hooper	636	1.13	–0.41
Libertarian	Ken Lewis	233	0.41	+0.06
Independent	Arabella Vida	138	0.25	–
Independent	Burthomley Douzable	129	0.23	–
Total valid votes		56,262	99.39	
Total rejected, unmarked and declined ballots		347	0.61	+0.26
Turnout		56,609	47.70	+1.11
Eligible voters		118,683		
Liberal hold		Swing		+2.63
Source: Elections Ontario

Winning party in each polling division of Orléans at the 2022 Ontario general election

2022 Ontario general election
Party	Candidate	Votes	%	±%	Expenditures
Liberal	Stephen Blais	23,982	46.26	–9.82	$96,104
Progressive Conservative	Melissa Felián	16,926	32.65	+9.34	$76,495
New Democratic	Gabe Bourdon	7,150	13.79	–1.45	$13,851
Green	Michelle Petersen	2,359	4.55	+0.36	$6,196
New Blue	Liam Randall	796	1.54	–	$7,734
Ontario Party	Vince Clements	442	0.85	–	$0
Libertarian	Ken Lewis	184	0.35	–0.19	$0
Total valid votes/expense limit		51,839	99.64	–	$156,324
Total rejected, unmarked and declined ballots		185	0.36	+0.05	
Turnout		52,024	46.59	+23.51	
Eligible voters		111,660			
Liberal hold		Swing		–9.58	
Source: Elections Ontario

Ontario provincial by-election, February 27, 2020 Resignation of Marie-France Lalonde to run federally
Party	Candidate	Votes	%	±%
Liberal	Stephen Blais	14,302	56.08	+17.03
Progressive Conservative	Natalie Montgomery	5,945	23.31	–11.89
New Democratic	Manon Parrot	3,888	15.25	–6.70
Green	Andrew West	1,069	4.19	+1.69
Libertarian	Jean-Serge Brisson	138	0.54	–0.08
None of the Above	Keegan Bennett	100	0.39	–
Pauper	John Turmel	32	0.13	–
Ontario Alliance	Gerrie Huenemoerder	28	0.11	–
Total valid votes		25,502	99.69	
Total rejected, unmarked and declined ballots		79	0.31	–0.60
Turnout		25,581	23.09	–39.68
Eligible voters		110,811		
Liberal hold		Swing		+14.46
Source: Elections Ontario

2018 Ontario general election
Party	Candidate	Votes	%	±%
Liberal	Marie-France Lalonde	24,972	39.05	−14.21
Progressive Conservative	Cameron Montgomery	22,509	35.20	+1.76
New Democratic	Barbara Zarboni	14,033	21.94	+12.91
Green	Nicholas Lapierre	1,603	2.51	−1.04
Independent	Samuel Schwisberg	435	0.68	N/A
Libertarian	Gerald Boudreau	398	0.62	−0.11
Total valid votes		63,950	99.09	
Total rejected, unmarked and declined ballots		589	0.91	
Turnout		64,539	62.77	
Eligible voters		102,821		
Liberal notional hold		Swing		−7.99
Source: Elections Ontario

2014 general election redistributed results
Party	Vote	%
Liberal	29,688	53.26
Progressive Conservative	18,639	33.44
New Democratic	5,034	9.03
Green	1,978	3.55
Others	406	0.73

2014 Ontario general election: Ottawa—Orléans
Party	Candidate	Votes	%	±%
Liberal	Marie-France Lalonde	29,911	53.50	+7.06
Progressive Conservative	Andrew Lister	18,525	33.14	–7.24
New Democratic	Prosper M'Bemba-Meka	5,022	8.98	–1.60
Green	Bob Bell	2,036	3.64	+1.76
Libertarian	Gerry Bourdeau	411	0.74	+0.41
Total valid votes		55,905	98.91	
Total rejected, unmarked and declined ballots		615	1.09	+0.71
Turnout		56,520	59.33	+6.68
Eligible voters		95,258		
Liberal hold		Swing		+7.15
Source: Elections Ontario

2011 Ontario general election: Ottawa—Orléans
Party	Candidate	Votes	%	±%	Expenditures
Liberal	Phil McNeely	21,857	46.44	–6.42	$86,835.18
Progressive Conservative	Andrew Lister	19,003	40.38	+5.97	$57,251.00
New Democratic	Doug McKercher	4,979	10.58	+4.22	$1,389.28
Green	Tanya Gutmanis	886	1.88	–2.68	$0
Freedom	David McGruer	183	0.39	+0.01	$0
Libertarian	David Paul	154	0.33	–	$82.01
Total valid votes/expense limit		47,062	99.62	–	$106,791.79
Total rejected, unmarked and declined ballots		179	0.38	–0.05	
Turnout		47,241	52.65	–5.21	
Eligible voters		89,726			
Liberal hold		Swing		–6.19	
Source: Elections Ontario

2007 Ontario general election: Ottawa—Orléans
Party	Candidate	Votes	%	±%	Expenditures
Liberal	Phil McNeely	25,649	52.86	+2.51	$ 67,961.00
Progressive Conservative	Graham Fox	16,695	34.41	−6.92	81,527.51
New Democratic	Andrée Germain	3,088	6.36	+0.84	1,922.66
Green	Akbar Manoussi	2,214	4.56	+1.77	4,719.58
Family Coalition	Jeremy Atkinson	692	1.43		3,538.98
Freedom	David McGruer	183	0.38		0.00
Total valid votes/expense limit		48,521	99.57		$ 90,965.16
Total rejected ballots		209	0.43	+0.04	
Turnout		48,730	57.86	−5.53	
Eligible voters		84,227		+5.85	
Liberal hold		Swing		+4.71	
Source(s) "Summary of Valid Votes Cast for Each Candidate – October 10, 2007 General Election" (PDF). Elections Ontario. "Statistical Summary – General Elections 2007" (PDF). Elections Ontario. "2007 Candidate Campaign Returns (CR-1)".

2003 Ontario general election: Ottawa—Orléans
Party	Candidate	Votes	%	±%	Expenditures
Liberal	Phil McNeely	25,300	50.36	+9.92	$ 66,785.00
Progressive Conservative	Brian Coburn	20,762	41.32	−13.24	73,997.09
New Democratic	Ric Dagenais	2,778	5.53	+2.85	11,889.14
Green	Melanie Ransom	1,402	2.79	+1.42	1,069.07
Total valid votes/expense limit		50,242	99.61		$ 76,391.04
Total rejected ballots		197	0.39	−0.21	
Turnout		50,439	63.39	+2.52	
Eligible voters		79,574		+11.69	
Liberal gain from Progressive Conservative		Swing		+11.58	
Source(s) "General Election of October 2, 2003 – Summary of Valid Ballots by Candidate". Elections Ontario. "General Election of October 2, 2003 – Statistical Summary". Elections Ontario. "2003 Candidate and Constituency Associations – Candidate Campaign Return (CR-1)".

1999 Ontario general election: Carleton—Gloucester
Party	Candidate	Votes	%	Expenditures
Progressive Conservative	Brian Coburn	24,356	54.56	$32,653.11
Liberal	René Danis	18,052	40.44	$29,722.53
New Democratic	Jamie Gallant	1,195	2.68	Unavailable
Green	André Clermont	614	1.38	$212.00
Independent	Luc Brisebois	247	0.55	$0
Natural Law	Richard Michael Wolfson	177	0.40	$0
Total valid votes/expense limit		44,641	99.40	$70,837.44
Total rejected, unmarked and declined ballots		270	0.60	
Turnout		44,911	60.86	
Eligible voters		73,789		
Liberal pickup new district.				
Source: Elections Ontario

== 2007 electoral reform referendum ==
2007 Ontario electoral reform referendum
Side	Votes	%
First Past the Post	33,602	70.1
Mixed member proportional	14,351	29.9
Total valid votes	47,953	100.0

== See also ==
- List of Ontario provincial electoral districts
- Canadian provincial electoral districts
