= Marie-France Lalonde =

Politician and MP in Ontario, Canada

The Honourable Marie-France Lalonde ECO MP
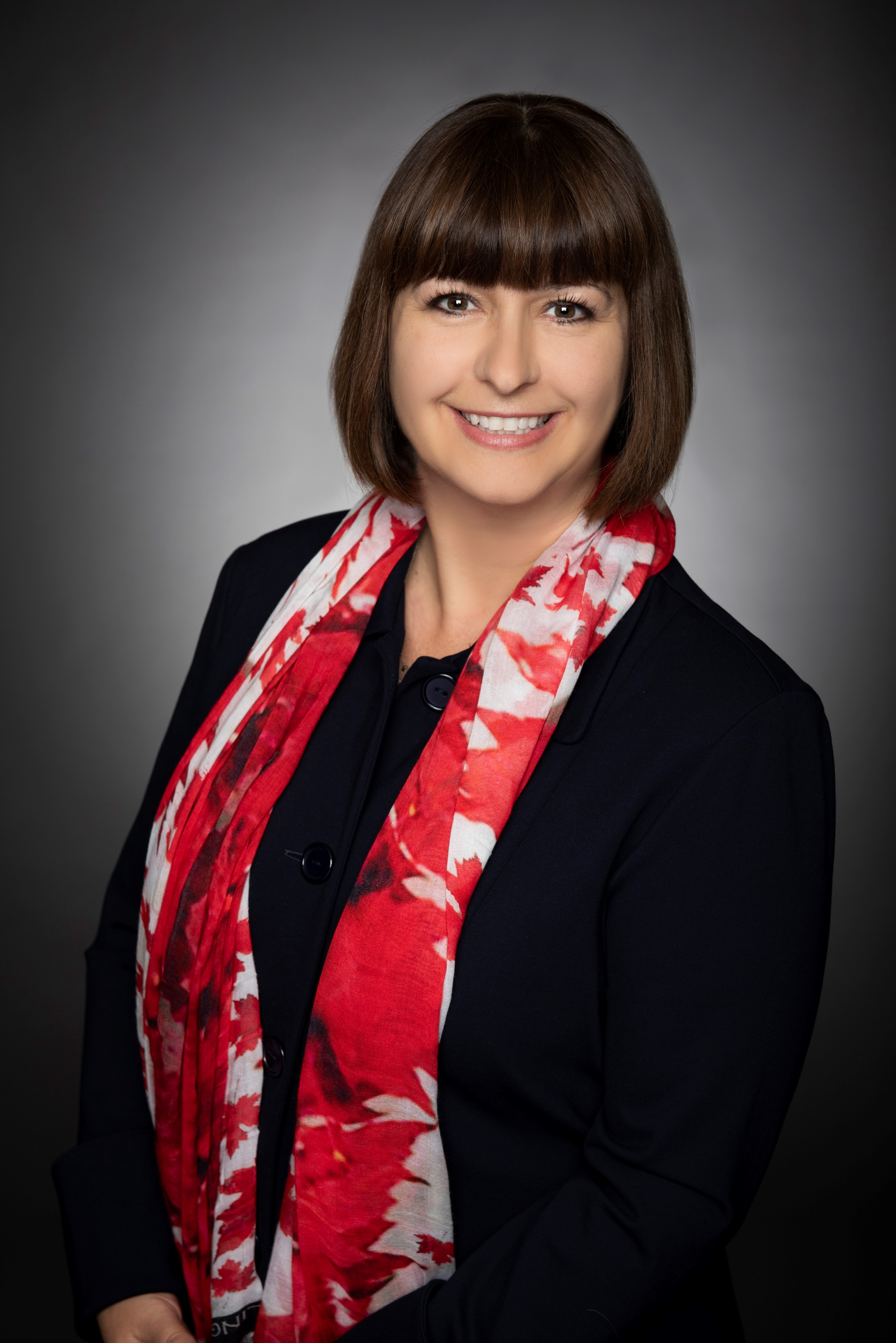

Member of Parliament for Orléans
- Incumbent
- Assumed office October 21, 2019
- Preceded by: Andrew Leslie

Member of the Ontario Provincial Parliament
- In office June 12, 2014 – September 20, 2019
- Preceded by: Phil McNeely
- Succeeded by: Stephen Blais
- Constituency: Ottawa-Orléans (2014–2018); Orléans (2018–present)

Personal details
- Born: 1971 (age 54–55) Ottawa, Ontario, Canada
- Party: Liberal
- Other political affiliations: Liberal (provincial)
- Profession: Former Businesswoman, Former Social Worker, Politician

Marie-France Lalonde MP (born c. 1971) is a Franco-Ontarian politician in Ontario, Canada who has served as the Member of Parliament (MP) for the riding of Orléans as a member of the Liberal Party of Canada since 2019. She also served as the Liberal Member of Provincial Parliament (MPP) for the provincial riding of Orléans from 2014 until 2019, when she resigned her seat to run federally. She then won in her riding with 54 percent of the vote.

In January 2017, she was appointed as Minister of Community Safety and Correctional Services. In July 2017, she was appointed as the first Minister of Francophone Affairs. She served in those roles until the end of the government of Kathleen Wynne. She previously served as Minister of Government and Consumer Services and as Minister Responsible for Francophone Affairs in the cabinet of Kathleen Wynne.

== Background ==
Lalonde was born in Ottawa, Ontario, into a Franco-Ontarian family and grew up in Gatineau, Quebec. She attended Collège de l'Outaouais, the University of Ottawa, where she earned a Bachelor of Arts in Social Work, and the Université du Québec à Hull. She worked for the Children's Hospital of Eastern Ontario and the Ottawa Hospital for over ten years. She was also co-owner and general manager of Portobello Manor, a senior's residence in Orléans, for which she received the 2010 New Business of the Year Award from the Orléans Chamber of Commerce.

She has been living in Orléans since 1999.

== Politics ==
=== Provincial politics ===
Lalonde ran in the 2014 provincial election as the Liberal candidate in the riding of Ottawa—Orléans. She won with 53.50% of the vote, beating Progressive Conservative Candidate by over 11,000 votes

She was the Parliamentary Assistant to the Minister of Economic Development, Employment and Infrastructure, focusing on economic development issues. She was also the Parliamentary Assistant to Madeleine Meilleur in her capacity as responsible for francophone affairs. On September 2, 2015, she was appointed as Chief Government Whip and served until her appointment to cabinet.

In June 2016, she was appointed to cabinet as the Minister of Government and Consumer Services and the Minister Responsible for Francophone Affairs on June 13, 2016. On January 12, 2017, she was moved to the position of Minister of Community Safety and Correctional Services, replacing David Orazietti, who resigned unexpectedly in December 2016. In July 2017, she was created the Minister of Francophone Affairs.

In March 2015, she introduced a Private Member's Bill to the Legislative Assembly of Ontario, Bill 75, which would ban the production and addition of microbeads to cosmetic products in Ontario. Ontario was the first provincial jurisdiction to address the growing concern of microbeads. In June 2015, Bill 75 went to public hearings at committee.

In September 2, 2015, she was appointed Chief Government Whip, a position she held until her cabinet appointment.

In March 2016, Lalonde introduced a motion that sought to have a monument to the first two female MPPs elected to the Ontario Legislature erected on the grounds of the legislature. The motion was debated on March 22, 2016, and received unanimous support from all three parties.

As Minister of Government and Consumer Services, she introduced Bill 59, Putting Consumers First Act, which introduced regulations for door-to-door sales, home inspectors and further regulations for alternative financial services.

In November 2017, she introduced legislation leading to a wholesale reform of the Police Services Act. This act was informed by public consultation and a report by Justice Tulloch. The reforms introduced greater oversight for police, and significant changes to how police will operate in the province.

Running for re-election in the 2018 general election, she was one of seven Liberal MPPs elected securing 39.05% of the vote and a margin of fewer than 2,500 votes.

On March 20, 2018, she introduced Bill 6 – the Correctional Services Transformation Act, 2018. It passed Third Reading in the Legislative Assembly of Ontario, and received Royal Assent on May 7, 2018. The Act will result in improved conditions, increased transparency, and will apply a consistent and evidence-based approach to rehabilitation and reintegration to better prepare those in custody for a successful and well-supported return to their communities. The Act transform Ontario's adult correctional system by setting rules and clearly defining segregation, improving conditions of confinement, increasing transparency and accountability, ensuring incarcerated individuals have access to appropriate health care services, and better supporting rehabilitation and reintegration.

In a 2017 episode of the television series Political Blind Date, Lalonde and Cheri DiNovo discussed their differing perspectives on the issue of criminal justice and corrections.

=== Federal politics ===
On May 13, 2019, Lalonde announced that she would be running for the federal Liberal Party's nomination in the 2019 federal election to attempt to succeed retiring MP Andrew Leslie in Orléans. She won the nomination on September 19 and resigned her seat the next day.

On October 21, Lalonde won the riding of Orléans with 54 per cent of the vote and was re-elected on September 20, 2021.

Lalonde had served as Parliamentary Secretary for various ministries including the Minister of Economic Development and Official Languages (March 19, 2021- August 15, 2021), Immigration, Refugees and Citizenship (December 3, 2021- September 17, 2023), and Minister of National Defence (September 18, 2023 - April 27, 2025).

She was previously a member of the Standing Committee on National Defence and the Special Committee on the Canada–China Relationship, and previously served on the Standing Committee on Citizenship and Immigration, the Standing Committee on Veterans Affairs, and the Standing Committee on Official Languages. She also the former President of the Canada-France Interparliamentary Association and was awarded the rank of Chevalier in the National Order of Merit of the French Republic on February 1, 2024, at the French Residence in Ottawa.

She is the current chair of the Standing Committee on Veterans Affairs and also the Canadian Branch of Assemblée parlementaire de la Francophonie, or CAPF.

=== Cabinet positions ===
Wynne ministry, Province of Ontario (2013–2018)
Cabinet posts (3)
| Predecessor | Office | Successor |
|---|---|---|
| | Minister of Francophone Affairs; July 26, 2018 – September 20, 2019 | Caroline Mulroney |
| David Orazietti | Minister of Community Safety and Correctional Services; 2017–2018; Also responsible for Francophone Affairs | Michael Tibollo |
| David Orazietti | Minister of Government and Consumer Services; 2016–2017 | Tracy MacCharles |
Special Parliamentary Responsibilities
| Predecessor | Title | Successor |
| Bob Delaney | Chief Government Whip; 2015–2016 | Jim Bradley |

== Electoral record ==
=== Federal ===
2025 Canadian federal election: Orléans
| Party | Candidate | Votes | % | ±% |
|---|---|---|---|---|
| Liberal | Marie-France Lalonde | 53,146 | 67.44 | +15.10 |
| Conservative | Steve Mansour | 22,072 | 28.01 | –0.66 |
| New Democratic | Oulai B. Goué | 2,063 | 2.63 | –11.83 |
| Green | Jaycob Jacques | 652 | 0.83 | –0.79 |
| People's | Tafiqul Abu Mohammad | 331 | 0.42 | –2.22 |
| Libertarian | Arlo Arrowsmith | 301 | 0.38 | N/A |
| Independent | Mazhar Choudhry | 162 | 0.21 | N/A |
| Independent | Arabella Vida | 76 | 0.10 | N/A |
| Total valid votes/expense limit | | 78,803 | 99.31 | |
| Total rejected ballots | | 548 | 0.69 | -0.17 |
| Turnout | | 79,351 | 76.90 | +6.05 |
| Eligible voters | | 103,193 | | |
| Liberal notional hold | | Swing | | +7.88 |
Source: Elections Canada

2021 Canadian federal election: Orléans
| Party | Candidate | Votes | % | ±% | Expenditures |
|---|---|---|---|---|---|
| Liberal | Marie-France Lalonde | 39,101 | 51.94 | -2.33 | $110,602.16 |
| Conservative | Mary-Elsie Wolfe | 21,700 | 28.82 | +0.59 | $42,104.38 |
| New Democratic | Jessica Joanis | 10,983 | 14.59 | +3.01 | $13,134.25 |
| People's | Spencer Oklobdzija | 2,046 | 2.72 | +1.51 | $1,993.00 |
| Green | Michael Hartnett | 1,233 | 1.64 | -3.06 | $0.00 |
| Free | André Junior Cléroux | 220 | 0.29 | – | $2.00 |
| Total valid votes/expense limit | | – | – | – | $132,099.22 |
| Total rejected ballots | | | | | |
| Turnout | | | | | |
| Eligible voters | | | | | |
Source: Elections Canada

2019 Canadian federal election: Orléans
| Party | Candidate | Votes | % | ±% | Expenditures |
|---|---|---|---|---|---|
| Liberal | Marie-France Lalonde | 44,183 | 54.27 | -5.41 | $111,417.25 |
| Conservative | David Bertschi | 22,984 | 28.23 | -2.31 | $100,885.58 |
| New Democratic | Jacqui Wiens | 9,428 | 11.58 | +3.61 | $3,637.15 |
| Green | Michelle Petersen | 3,829 | 4.70 | +2.90 | none listed |
| People's | Roger Saint-Fleur | 986 | 1.21 | – | none listed |
| Total valid votes/expense limit | | 81,410 | 99.29 | | |
| Total rejected ballots | | 585 | 0.71 | +0.37 | |
| Turnout | | 81,995 | 77.12 | -3.44 | |
| Eligible voters | | 106,321 | | | |
| Liberal hold | | Swing | | -1.55 | |
Source: Elections Canada

=== Provincial ===
2018 Ontario general election: Orléans
| Party | Candidate | Votes | % | ±% |
|---|---|---|---|---|
| Liberal | Marie-France Lalonde | 24,972 | 39.05 | –14.21 |
| Progressive Conservative | Cameron Montgomery | 22,509 | 35.20 | +1.76 |
| New Democratic | Barbara Zarboni | 14,033 | 21.94 | +12.91 |
| Green | Nicholas Lapierre | 1,603 | 2.51 | –1.04 |
| Independent | Samuel Schwisberg | 435 | 0.68 | – |
| Libertarian | Gerald Bourdeau | 398 | 0.62 | –0.11 |
| Total valid votes | | 63,950 | 99.09 | |
| Total rejected, unmarked and declined ballots | | 589 | 0.91 | |
| Turnout | | 64,539 | 62.77 | |
| Eligible voters | | 102,821 | | |
| Liberal notional hold | | Swing | | –7.99 |
Source: Elections Ontario

2014 Ontario general election: Ottawa—Orléans
| Party | Candidate | Votes | % | ±% |
|---|---|---|---|---|
| Liberal | Marie-France Lalonde | 29,911 | 53.50 | +7.06 |
| Progressive Conservative | Andrew Lister | 18,525 | 33.14 | –7.24 |
| New Democratic | Prosper M'Bemba-Meka | 5,022 | 8.98 | –1.60 |
| Green | Bob Bell | 2,036 | 3.64 | +1.76 |
| Libertarian | Gerry Bourdeau | 411 | 0.74 | +0.41 |
| Total valid votes | | 55,905 | 98.91 | |
| Total rejected, unmarked and declined ballots | | 615 | 1.09 | +0.71 |
| Turnout | | 56,520 | 59.33 | +6.68 |
| Eligible voters | | 95,258 | | |
| Liberal hold | | Swing | | +7.15 |
Source: Elections Ontario
