= Marc Godbout =

Canadian politician, teacher and education administrator

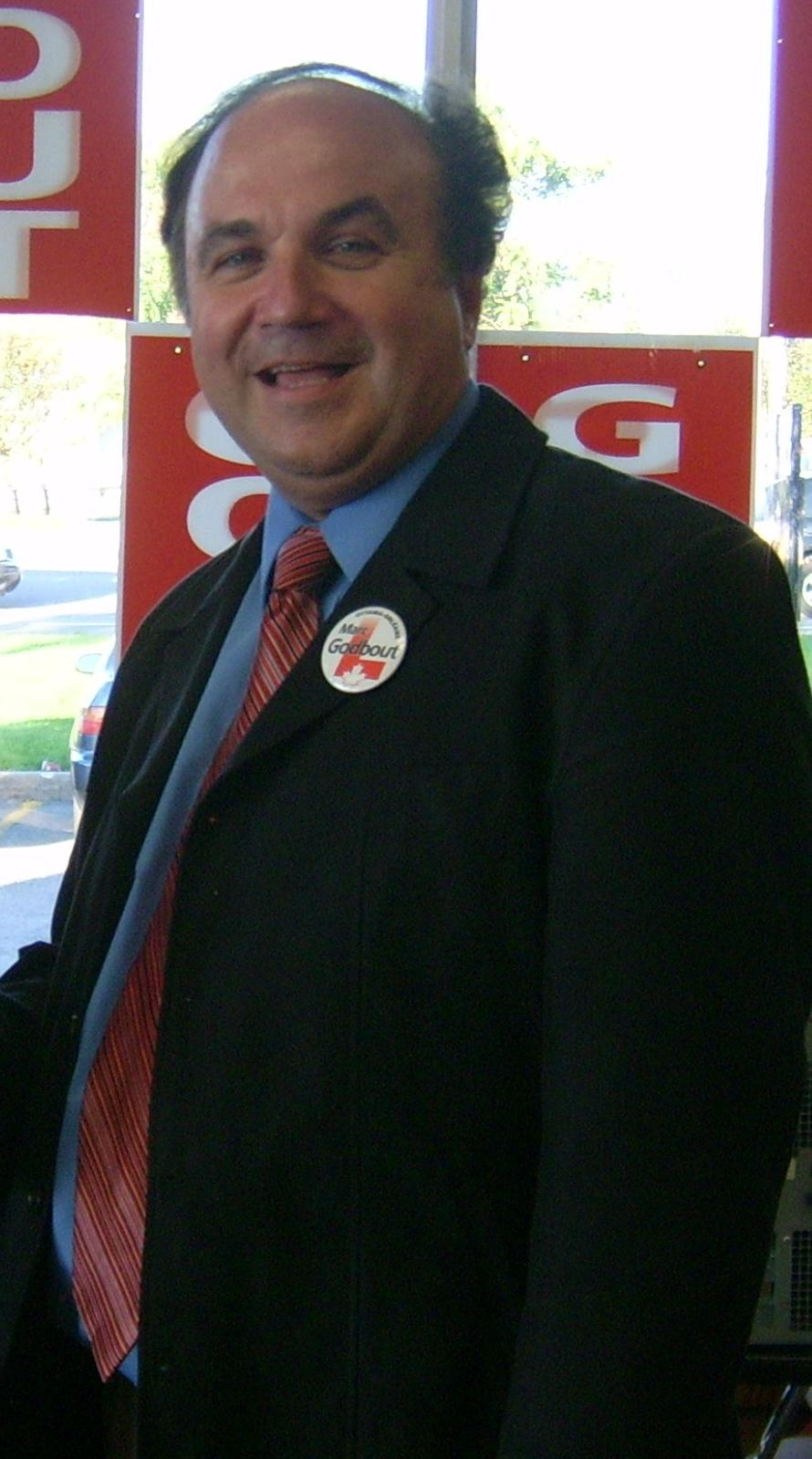
- Marc Godbout during the 2008 Canadian federal election

Member of Parliament for Ottawa—Orléans
- In office 2004–2006
- Preceded by: Eugène Bellemare
- Succeeded by: Royal Galipeau

Personal details
- Party: Liberal

Marc Godbout (born June 8, 1951) is a Canadian politician, teacher and education administrator. He is the former Member of Parliament (MP) for the Ottawa—Orléans riding. He was first elected in the 2004 Canadian federal election, representing the Liberal Party of Canada.

Born in Ottawa, Ontario, Godbout has a master's degree in education from the University of Ottawa.

Before entering politics, he worked as a high school history teacher. He has been Assistant Deputy Minister responsible for elementary and secondary education in Ontario and Director General and Secretary Treasurer of the Conseil des écoles catholiques de langue française du Centre-Est de l’Ontario.

He entered federal politics by running for the Liberal nomination against sitting Liberal MP Eugène Bellemare. Bellemare, who held the riding for several elections, was removed. After his defeat in the nomination, Bellemare retired from politics.

Godbout succeeded in beating the Conservative candidate Walter Robinson in the general election of 2004, by a slim majority. He campaigned on bringing more federal government jobs to the east end of Ottawa.

In the 2006 general election, Godbout ran on a platform of Liberal support for municipalities and infrastructure. After eighteen years of the riding being held by the Liberals, Godbout was defeated for re-election when the Conservative Party of Canada won the riding under Royal Galipeau in the federal election of January 23, 2006.

Godbout, along with a number of former and present Ontario Liberal MPs endorsed party leadership candidate Gerard Kennedy. At the Liberal Party Convention in Montreal, Godbout supported Michael Ignatieff after Kennedy dropped off the ballot. At the final ballot, Ignatieff was defeated by Stéphane Dion.

On April 29, 2007, Godbout was nominated to run in the 40th Canadian federal election in a re-match against Galipeau. In the 2008 Canadian federal election, Godbout lost for the second time in a row to Conservative incumbent Royal Galipeau, and this time by an increased majority. The re-election of Galipeau marks the first time a Conservative candidate has been re-elected in the Orléans riding since 1872.

In July 2009, Godbout announced that he would not make another run at reclaiming the riding in the next federal election. He said the decision was a professional one, as he wanted to focus on his business, a consulting firm, operating out of the east end.
