= Eugène Bellemare =

Canadian politician (1932–2018)

Member of the Canadian Parliament for Ottawa—Orléans Carleton—Gloucester (1988—2000)
- In office 1988–2004
- Preceded by: Riding created
- Succeeded by: Marc Godbout

Personal details
- Born: April 6, 1932; Ottawa, Ontario, Canada
- Died: July 6, 2018 (aged 86); Ottawa, Ontario, Canada
- Spouse: Roberte Gauthier
- Children: Michel Bellemare
- Occupation: Politician

Eugène Bellemare (April 6, 1932 — July 6, 2018) was a Canadian politician.

Bellemare was a former Member of Parliament of the Liberal Party of Canada in the House of Commons of Canada, representing the riding of Ottawa—Orléans between 2000 and 2004 and previously Carleton—Gloucester from 1988 to 2000. Bellemare was a former administrator and teacher. He was a former parliamentary secretary to the Minister for International Cooperation. Bellemare lost his riding nomination battle to Marc Godbout for the 2004 election. He was one of only eight Liberal MPs to lose their party nomination battle for the 2004 election.

His son Michel Bellemare was an Ottawa city councillor.

Before entering federal politics, Bellemare served on the council for the Regional Municipality of Ottawa-Carleton from 1980 to 1985 and the township and then city council for Gloucester from 1966 to 1988.

Bellemare endorsed Dalton McGuinty's bid to lead the Ontario Liberal Party in 1996 (Canada NewsWire, 19 August 1996).
