= List of postal codes of Canada: K =

This is a list of postal codes in Canada where the first letter is K. Only the first three characters are listed, corresponding to the Forward Sortation Area (FSA).

Postal districts in Ontario: K / L / M / N / P

K is one of the five postal districts in Ontario. Postal codes beginning with K cover areas in the National Capital Region (Ottawa, with postal codes starting with K1, K2 and K4), Eastern Ontario, and most of the Central Ontario region. The first two characters of the postal code correspond to the following cities/urban areas.

- K1, K2, K4 – Ottawa (with the exceptions of K4K and K4R, assigned to Rockland and Russell respectively)
- K6 – Cornwall, Brockville
- K7 – Kingston, Napanee, Renfrew, Gananoque
- K8 – Belleville, Trenton, Pembroke
- K9 – Peterborough, Cobourg, Lindsay

Postal codes where the second digit is a zero indicates a wide-area rural region, at least in theory. Many newer residential developments in suburban Ottawa remain parts of the K0A forward sorting area, one of the most populous FSA in the country, with many neighbourhood completed years ago still awaiting their postal "urbanization", the process where Canada Post replaces rural postal codes (with communities within a forward sorting area generally organized alphabetically with little regard to their georgraphical location or population) with more finely organized urban postal codes. While urban postal codes typically each cover a few hundreds delivery addresses on one or two streets, delay in urbanization means some postal codes cover many more. For example, the postal code K0A 1A0 for the community of Almonte in the town of Mississippi Mills has within it over 200 distinct streets and more than 6,000 registered addresses, while the postal codes K0A 1L0 and K0A 2Z0, respectively covering Carp and Richmond communities in the City of Ottawa, each has well over a hundred distinct streets and more than 4,000 addresses.

Canada Post provides a free postal code look-up tool on its website, via its mobile apps, and sells hard-copy directories and CD-ROMs. Many vendors also sell validation tools, which allow customers to properly match addresses and postal codes. Hard-copy directories can also be consulted in all post offices, and some libraries.

== Eastern Ontario ==
There are currently 84 FSAs in this list. No postal codes currently begin with K3* or K5*.

=== Urban ===
K1A; Government of Canada; Ottawa and Gatineau offices (partly in QC)	K2A; Ottawa (Highland Park / McKellar Heights / McKellar Park / Glabar Park / Carlingwood)	K4A; Ottawa (Fallingbrook)	K6A; Hawkesbury	K7A; Smiths Falls	K8A; Pembroke; Central and northern subdivisions	K9A; Cobourg
K1B; Ottawa (Blackburn Hamlet / Pine View / Sheffield Glen)	K2B; Ottawa (Britannia / Foster Farm / Queensway Terrace North / Whitehaven / Bayshore / Woodpark)	K4B; Ottawa (Navan)	K6B; Not assigned	K7B; Not assigned	K8B; Pembroke (Pleasant View / Fairview)	K9B; Not assigned
K1C; Ottawa (Orleans West) (Chapel Hill, Chateauneuf, Convent Glen, Hiawatha Park, Orleans Village, Orleans Wood)	K2C; Ottawa (Queensway Terrace South / Ridgeview / Parkway Park / Kenson Park / Bel-Air Park / Braemar Park / Bel-Air Heights / Copeland Park / Central Park / Carleton Heights / Carleton University)	K4C; Ottawa (Cumberland)	K6C; Not assigned	K7C; Carleton Place	K8C; Not assigned	K9C; Not assigned
K1E; Ottawa (Orleans Central) (Queenswood Heights, Queenswood Village)	K2E; Ottawa (Nepean East) (Skyline / Fisher Heights/ Parkwood Hills / Stewart Farm / Borden Farm / Fisher Glen / CitiPlace / Pineglen, Clearview / Country Place)	K4E; Not assigned	K6E; Not assigned	K7E; Not assigned	K8E; Not assigned	K9E; Not assigned
K1G; Ottawa (Eastway Gardens / Riverview / Hawthorne / Elmvale Acres / Canterbury / Hunt Club Park)	K2G; Ottawa (Nepean Central); Briargreen, Centrepointe, Ryan Farm, Algonquin College, Meadowlands, City View, Crestview, Craig Henry, Woodvale, Manordale, Tangelwood, Merivale Gardens, Grenfell Glen, Ashdale, Rideau Glen, Davidson Heights, Havenlea)	K4G; Not assigned	K6G; Not assigned	K7G; Gananoque	K8G; Not assigned	K9G; Not assigned
K1H; Ottawa (Alta Vista / Billings Bridge)	K2H; Ottawa (Bells Corners / Trend-Arlington / Redwood / Qualicum-Graham Park / Leslie Park / Crystal Beach / Lakeview / Rocky Point / Crystal Bay)	K4H; Not assigned	K6H; Cornwall; East	K7H; Perth	K8H; Petawawa	K9H; Peterborough; Central
K1J; Ottawa (Beacon Hill / Cyrville / Carson Grove)	K2J; Ottawa (Barrhaven)	K4J; Not assigned	K6J; Cornwall; West	K7J; Not assigned	K8J; Not assigned	K9J; Peterborough; South (Douro-Dummer)
K1K; Ottawa (Overbrook, Forbes, Manor Park, Viscount Alexander Park, Carson Meadows)	K2K; Ottawa (Kanata North) (Beaverbrook / Morgan's Grant / Briar Brook / Kanata Lakes)	K4K; Rockland	K6K; Cornwall; North	K7K; Kingston Main (SW Pittsburgh Township, CFB Kingston, Kingscourt, Rideau Heights)	K8K; Not assigned	K9K; Peterborough (Fairbairn Meadows / Jackson Heights)
K1L; Ottawa (Vanier, McKay Lake area)	K2L; Ottawa (Kanata Central) (Katimavik-Hazeldean / Glen Cairn)	K4L; Not assigned	K6L; Not assigned	K7L; Kingston Main (Downtown, area bounded by Princess St., Sir John A. MacDonald Blvd and Lake Ontario)	K8L; Not assigned	K9L; Peterborough (Terra View Heights / Woodland Acres / Donwood)
K1M; Ottawa (Rockcliffe Park / New Edinburgh / Lindenlea)	K2M; Ottawa (Kanata South) (Bridlewood, Trailwest, Blackstone)	K4M; Ottawa (Manotick)	K6M; Not assigned	K7M; Kingston Station "A" (Portsmouth, Reddendale / Cataraqui / Collins Bay)	K8M; Not assigned	K9M; Not assigned
K1N; Ottawa (Lower Town / ByWard Market / Sandy Hill / University of Ottawa)	K2N; Not assigned	K4N; Not assigned	K6N; Not assigned	K7N; Amherstview (Kingston)	K8N; Belleville; East Canadian Forces (Army / RCAF / CANCOM)	K9N; Not assigned
K1P; Ottawa (Downtown)	K2P; Ottawa (Centretown)	K4P; Ottawa (Greely)	K6P; Not assigned	K7P; Kingston Station "A" (Westbrook / Cataraqui Woods / Cedarwood)	K8P; Belleville; West	K9P; Not assigned
K1R; Ottawa (Centretown West / Chinatown / LeBreton Flats / Little Italy)	K2R; Ottawa (Fallowfield Village / Cedarhill Estates / Orchard Estates)	K4R; Russell	K6R; Not assigned	K7R; Napanee	K8R; Belleville (SE Sidney Township / Avondale)	K9R; Not assigned
K1S; Ottawa (The Glebe / Old Ottawa South / Old Ottawa East / Glebe Annex)	K2S; Ottawa (Stittsville, Huntley, Healey's Heath, Stanley Corners, Mansfield, Bridlewood Trails)	K4S; Not assigned	K6S; Not assigned	K7S; Arnprior	K8S; Not assigned	K9S; Not assigned
K1T; Ottawa (Blossom Park / Greenboro / Leitrim / Findlay Creek)	K2T; Ottawa (Kanata West) (Marchwood, Kanata Estates, Richardson Estates, Heritage Hills, Arcadia)	K4T; Not assigned	K6T; Elizabethtown-Kitley (Brockville)	K7T; Not assigned	K8T; Not assigned	K9T; Not assigned
K1V; Ottawa (Cedardale, Ellwood / Heron Gate / Heron Park / Riverside Park / Honey Gables / Hunt Club / Ridgemont / Riverside South / South Keys / Uplands)	K2V; Ottawa (Bradley Commons, Fernbank Crossing, Abbottsville Crossing)	K4V; Not assigned	K6V; Brockville	K7V; Renfrew	K8V; Trenton	K9V; Lindsay
K1W; Ottawa (Orleans Southwest) (Bradley Estates / Chapel Hill South / Blackburn / Trailsedge)	K2W; Ottawa (March) (South March / Brookside / Marchhurst / Harwood Plains)	K4W; Not assigned	K6W; Not assigned	K7W; Not assigned	K8W; Not assigned	K9W; Not assigned
K1X; Ottawa (South Gloucester) (Ficko)	K2X; Not assigned	K4X; Not assigned	K6X; Not assigned	K7X; Not assigned	K8X; Not assigned	K9X; Not assigned
K1Y; Ottawa (Civic Hospital / Wellington Village / Hintonburg / Mechanicsville / Champlain Park / Tunney's Pasture)	K2Y; Not assigned	K4Y; Not assigned	K6Y; Not assigned	K7Y; Not assigned	K8Y; Not assigned	K9Y; Not assigned
K1Z; Ottawa (Westboro / Carlington)	K2Z; Not assigned	K4Z; Not assigned	K6Z; Not assigned	K7Z; Not assigned	K8Z; Not assigned	K9Z; Not assigned

=== Rural ===
K0A
National Capital Region

1A0: Almonte
1B0: Ashton
1E0: Bourget
1G0: Braeside
1K0: Carlsbad Springs and Piperville
1L0: Carp
1M0: Casselman
1N0: Clarence Creek
1P0: Clayton
1R0: Crysler
1T0: Dunrobin
1V0: Edwards
1W0: Embrun (eastern part)
1W1: Embrun (western part)
1X0: Fitzroy Harbour
2A0: Hammond
2E0: Kars
2G0: Kenmore
2H0: Kinburn
2M0: Limoges
2P0: Metcalfe
2R0: Morewood
2T0: North Gower
2W0: Osgoode
2X0: Pakenham
2Y0: Ramsayville
2Z0: Richmond
3C0: St. Albert
3E0: Sarsfield
3H0: Vars
3J0: Vernon
3K0: Wendover
3L0: White Lake
3M0: Woodlawn
3N0: Saint-Pascal-Baylon
3P0: Munster
3W0: Embrun
4A0: Almonte

K0B
Eastern & Central Prescott and Russell United Counties

1A0: Alfred
1B0: Chute à Blondeau
1C0: Curran
1E0: Dalkeith
1G0: Fournier
1H0: Glen Robertson
1J0: Lefaivre
1K0: L'Orignal
1L0: Plantagenet
1M0: Ste-Anne-de-Prescott
1N0: St-Bernardin
1P0: St. Eugene
1R0: Vankleek Hill

K0C
Stormont, Dundas and Glengarry United Counties

1A0: Alexandria
1B0: Apple Hill
1C0: Avonmore
1E0: Bainsville
1G0: Berwick
1H0: Chesterville
1J0: Dunvegan
1K0: Finch
1L0: Green Valley
1M0: Ingleside
1N0: Lancaster
1P0: Long Sault
1R0: Lunenburg
1S0: Martintown
1T0: Maxville
1V0: Monkland
1W0: Moose Creek
1X0: Morrisburg
1Y0: Newington
1Z0: North Lancaster
2A0: St. Andrews West
2B0: St. Isidore
2C0: South Lancaster
2E0: Summerstown
2H0: Williamsburg
2J0: Williamstown
2K0: Winchester
2L0: Winchester Springs

K0E
South Leeds and Grenville United Counties

1A0: Addison
1B0: Athens
1C0: Brinston
1E0: Cardinal
1G0: Delta
1H0: Frankville
1J0: Inkerman
1K0: Iroquois
1L0: Lansdowne
1M0: Lyn
1N0: Lyndhurst
1P0: Maitland
1R0: Mallorytown
1S0: Mountain
1T0: Prescott
1V0: Rockport
1W0: South Mountain
1X0: Spencerville
1Y0: Toledo

K0G
Rideau Lakes area

1A0: Balderson
1B0: Burritts Rapids
1E0: Elgin
1G0: Jasper
1J0: Kemptville
1K0: Lanark
1L0: Lombardy
1M0: McDonalds Corners
1N0: Merrickville
1P0: Newboro
1R0: North Augusta
1S0: Oxford Mills
1T0: Oxford Station
1V0: Portland
1W0: Rideau Ferry
1X0: Westport

K0H
Frontenac County, Lennox and Addington County, Southwest Leeds and Loyalist Shores

1B0: Arden
1C0: Ardoch
1G0: Bath
1H0: Battersea
1J0: Clarendon Station
1K0: Cloyne
1L0: Denbigh
1M0: Elginburg
1P0: Flinton
1S0: Glenburnie
1T0: Godfrey
1V0: Harrowsmith
1W0: Hartington
1X0: Inverary
1Y0: Joyceville
1Z0: Kaladar
2B0: Maberly
2C0: Mississippi Station
2E0: Mountain Grove
2G0: Northbrook
2H0: Odessa
2J0: Ompah
2K0: Parham
2L0: Perth Road
2M0: Plevna
2N0: Seeleys Bay
2P0: Sharbot Lake
2R0: Snow Road Station
2S0: Stella
2T0: Sydenham
2V0: Tichborne
2W0: Verona
2Y0: Wolfe Island

K0J
Renfrew County and Lanark Highlands Township

1B0: Barry's Bay
1C0: Beachburg
1E0: Bissett Creek
1G0: Burnstown
1H0: Calabogie
1J0: Chalk River
1K0: Cobden
1L0: Combermere
1M0: Cormac
1N0: Dacre
1P0: Deep River
1R0: Deux Rivieres
1S0: Douglas
1T0: Eganville
1V0: Foresters Falls
1W0: Foymount
1X0: Golden Lake
1Y0: Haley Station
2A0: Killaloe
2B0: Mackey
2C0: Madawaska
2E0: Palmer Rapids
2G0: Quadeville
2H0: Rolphton
2J0: Round Lake Centre
2K0: Stonecliffe
2L0: Westmeath
2M0: Whitney
2N0: Wilno
2R0: Griffith

K0K
Quinte Shores, East Northumberland County & Prince Edward County

0A0: Picton
1A0: Ameliasburgh
1B0: Astra
1C0: Baltimore
1E0: Batawa
1G0: Bloomfield
1H0: Brighton
1J0: Camden East
1K0: Cannifton
1L0: Carrying Place
1M0: Castleton
1N0: Centreville
1P0: Cherry Valley
1R0: Codrington
1S0: Colborne
1T0: Consecon
1V0: Corbyville
1W0: Demorestville
1X0: Deseronto
1Y0: Eldorado
1Z0: Enterprise
2A0: Erinsville
2B0: Foxboro
2C0: Frankford
2E0: Gores Landing
2G0: Grafton
2H0: Harwood
2J0: Hillier
2K0: Madoc (township) and Madoc (village)
2L0: Marlbank
2M0: Marmora
2N0: Marysville
2P0: Milford
2S0: Newburgh
2T0: Picton
2V0: Plainfield
2W0: Roblin
2X0: Roseneath
2Y0: Roslin
2Z0: Selby
3A0: Shannonville
3C0: Springbrook
3E0: Stirling
3G0: Tamworth
3H0: Thomasburg
3J0: Tweed
3K0: Warkworth
3L0: Wellington
3M0: Wooler
3N0: Yarker
3W0: Astra

K0L
Peterborough County and North Hastings County

0A0: Lakefield
1A0: Apsley
1B0: Bailieboro
1C0: Bancroft
1E0: Bewdley
1G0: Boulter
1H0: Bridgenorth
1J0: Buckhorn
1L0: Campbellford
1M0: Cardiff
1P0: Coe Hill
1R0: Curve Lake
1T0: Ennismore
1V0: Fraserville
1W0: Gilmour
1X0: Harcourt
1Y0: Hastings
1Z0: Havelock
2A0: Highland Grove
2B0: Douro-Dummer, Indian River
2G0: Keene
2H0: Douro-Dummer, Lakefield
2J0: Lakehurst
2K0: Lake St. Peter
2L0: L'Amable
2M0: McArthur's Mills
2R0: Maple Leaf
2S0: Maynooth
2V0: Norwood
2W0: Omemee
2X0: Reaboro
2Y0: Tory Hill
2Z0: Trent River
3A0: Douro-Dummer, Warsaw
3B0: Westwood
3C0: Wilberforce
3E0: Woodview
3G0: Young's Point

K0M
Kawartha Lakes and Haliburton County

1A0: Bobcaygeon
1B0: Bolsover
1C0: Burnt River
1E0: Cambray
1G0: Cameron
1J0: Algonquin Highlands
1K0: Coboconk
1L0: Dunsford
1M0: Eagle Lake
1N0: Fenelon Falls
1R0: Gooderham
1S0: Haliburton
1X0: Irondale
2A0: Kinmount
2B0: Kirkfield
2C0: Little Britain
2J0: Manilla
2K0: Minden
2L0: Norland
2M0: Oakwood
2S0: West Guilford
2T0: Woodville

K0N
Not in use
K0P
Not in use
K0R
Not in use
K0S
Not in use
K0T
Not in use
K0V
Not in use
K0W
Not in use
K0X
Not in use
K0Y
Not in use
K0Z
Not in use

== Most populous FSAs ==
1. K0K, 115,850
2. K0A, 111,626
3. K2J, 81,863
4. K0L, 78,142
5. K4A, 62,125

== Least populous FSAs ==
1. K8B, 490
2. K1A, 594
3. K1P, 645
4. K6T, 690
5. K2R, 1,237
