= List of neighbourhoods in Ottawa =

This is a list of neighbourhoods and outlying communities within the city of Ottawa, Ontario, Canada. In 2001, the old city of Ottawa was amalgamated with the suburbs of Nepean, Kanata, Gloucester, Rockcliffe Park, Vanier and Cumberland, and the rural townships of West Carleton, Osgoode, Rideau and Goulbourn, along with the systems and infrastructure of the Regional Municipality of Ottawa-Carleton, to become one municipality. The city is now organized into 24 wards.

== Old City of Ottawa ==
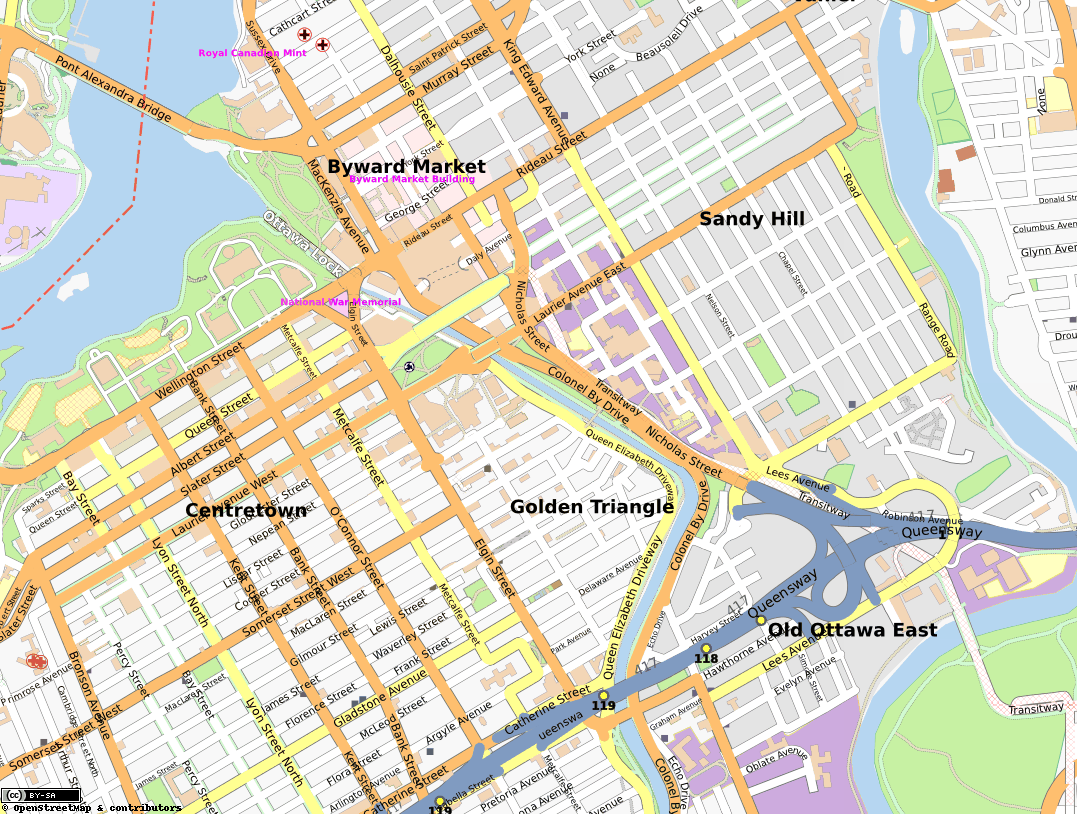
Map of the east end of Downtown Ottawa

=== Central Ottawa ===
- ByWard Market
- Centretown
- Centretown West
- Downtown
- The Glebe
- Golden Triangle
- LeBreton Flats
- Lower Town
- Old Ottawa East
- Old Ottawa South
- Sandy Hill

=== East end ===
- Carson Meadows
- Castle Heights
- Forbes
- Lees Avenue
- Lindenlea
- Manor Park
- New Edinburgh
- Overbrook
- Rockcliffe Park
- Vanier
- Viscount Alexander Park

=== South end ===
- Airport-Uplands
- Alta Vista
- Billings Bridge
- Confederation Heights
- Ellwood
- Elmvale Acres
- Greenboro
- Hawthorne Meadows
- Heron Gate
- Heron Park
- Hunt Club
- Hunt Club Park
- Riverside Park
- Riverview
- Mooney's Bay Park
- Sheffield Glen
- South Keys
- Urbandale

=== West end ===
- Ambleside
- Bel-Air Heights
- Bel-Air Park
- Belltown
- Braemar Park
- Britannia
- Britannia Heights
- Britannia Village
- Carleton Heights
- Carlington
- Carlingwood
- Central Park
- Champlain Park
- Civic Hospital
- Copeland Park
- Courtland Park
- Glabar Park
- Hampton Park
- Highland Park
- Hintonburg
- Kenson Park
- Lincoln Heights
- McKellar Heights
- McKellar Park
- Mechanicsville
- Michele Heights
- Qualicum
- Queensway Terrace North
- Redwood
- Rideau View
- Tunney's Pasture
- Wellington Village
- Westboro
- Whitehaven
- Woodpark
- Woodroffe North

== Gloucester ==
- Beacon Hill
- Blackburn Hamlet
- Blossom Park
- Carlsbad Springs
- Carson Grove
- Cedardale
- Chapel Hill
- Chateau Neuf
- Convent Glen
- Cyrville
- Edwards
- Elizabeth Park
- Ficko
- Findlay Creek
- Gloucester Glen
- Hiawatha Park
- Honey Gables
- Johnston Corners
- Kempark
- Leitrim
- Limebank
- Manotick Station
- Orleans
- Orléans Village
- Orléans Wood
- Pineview
- Piperville
- Ramsayville
- Riverside South
- Rothwell Heights
- South Gloucester
- Victory Hill
- Windsor Park Village

== Kanata ==
- Beaverbrook
- Bridlewood
- Glen Cairn
- Harwood Plains
- Kanata
- Kanata Lakes
- Kanata West
- Kanata Estates
- Katimavik-Hazeldean
- Lakeside
- Malwood
- Marchhurst
- Marchwood
- Morgan's Grant
- South March
- South March Station
- Strathearn
- Town Centre (Kanata)

== Nepean ==
- Arbeatha Park
- Arlington Woods
- Barrhaven
- Bayshore
- Bells Corners
- Belltown
- Borden Farm
- Boyce
- Briargreen
- Carleton Heights
- Cedarhill Estate
- Centrepointe
- City View
- Clearview
- Country Place
- Craig Henry
- Crestview
- Crystal Bay
- Crystal Beach
- Davidson Heights
- Fallowfield
- Fisher Glen
- Fisher Heights
- Fraservale
- Graham Park
- Grenfell Glen
- Half Moon Bay
- Hearts Desire
- Hillsdale
- Jockvale
- Knollsbrook
- Leslie Park
- Longfields
- Lynwood Village
- Manordale
- Meadowlands
- The Meadows
- Merivale Gardens
- Navaho
- Orchard Estates
- Parkwood Hills
- Pheasant Run
- Pineglen
- Qualicum
- Rideau Glen
- Rocky Point
- Ryan Farm
- Shirleys Bay
- Skyline
- Stonebridge
- Stonehedge
- Tanglewood
- Trend Village
- Twin Elm
- Valley Stream
- Westcliffe Estates

== Cumberland ==
- Avalon
- Bearbrook
- Beckett Creek
- Bella Vista
- Burromee
- Canaan
- Chaperal
- Chartrand
- Chatelaine Village
- Cumberland Village
- Cumberland Estates
- Fallingbrook
- French Hill
- Leonard
- Martins Corners
- Notre-Dame-des-Champs
- Navan
- River Walk
- Sarsfield
- Town Centre (Orleans)
- Queenswood Heights
- Queenswood South
- Queenswood Village
- Vars

== Goulbourn ==
- Amberwood Village
- Ashton
- Bryanston Gate
- Dwyer Hill
- Fringewood
- Healey's Heath
- Mansfield
- Munster
- Old Stittsville
- Red Pine Estates
- Richmond
- Stanley Corners
- Stapledon
- Stittsville
- Woodside Acres

== Osgoode Township ==
- Belmeade
- Dalmeny
- Greely
- Herbert Corners
- Kenmore
- Marionville
- Marvelville
- Metcalfe
- Osgoode
- Pana
- Reids Mills
- Spring Hill
- Vernon
- West Osgoode

== Rideau ==
=== Marlborough ===
- Baxters Corners
- Becketts Landing
- Burritts Rapids
- Goodstown
- Malakoff
- Mills Corners
- Moores Corners
- Pierces Corners

=== North Gower ===
- Carsonby
- Kars
- Manotick
- Reevecraig
- North Gower
- Watterson Corners

== West Carleton ==
=== Fitzroy ===
- Antrim
- Fitzroy Harbour
- Galetta
- Kinburn
- Marathon
- Marathon Village
- Marshall Bay
- Mohr Corners
- Panmure
- Quyon Ferry Landing
- Smith's Corners
- Vydon Acres
- Willola Beach
- Woodridge

=== Huntley ===
- Carp
- Corkery
- Huntley
- Huntley Manor Estates
- Manion Corners
- Westmont Estates
- Westwood

=== Torbolton ===
- Baskin's Beach
- Buckhams Bay
- Constance Bay
- Crown Point
- Dirleton
- Dunrobin
- Dunrobin Heights
- Dunrobin Shore
- Kilmaurs
- MacLarens
- McKay's Waterfront
- Torwood Estates
- Woodlawn

== Business improvement areas ==
- Bank Street Promenade
- Barrhaven
- Bells Corners
- ByWard Market
- Carp
- Downtown Rideau
- The Glebe
- Heart of Orleans
- Manotick
- Preston Street
- Somerset Street Chinatown
- Somerset Village
- Sparks Street
- Vanier
- Wellington Street West
- Westboro Village

== Historical neighbourhoods ==
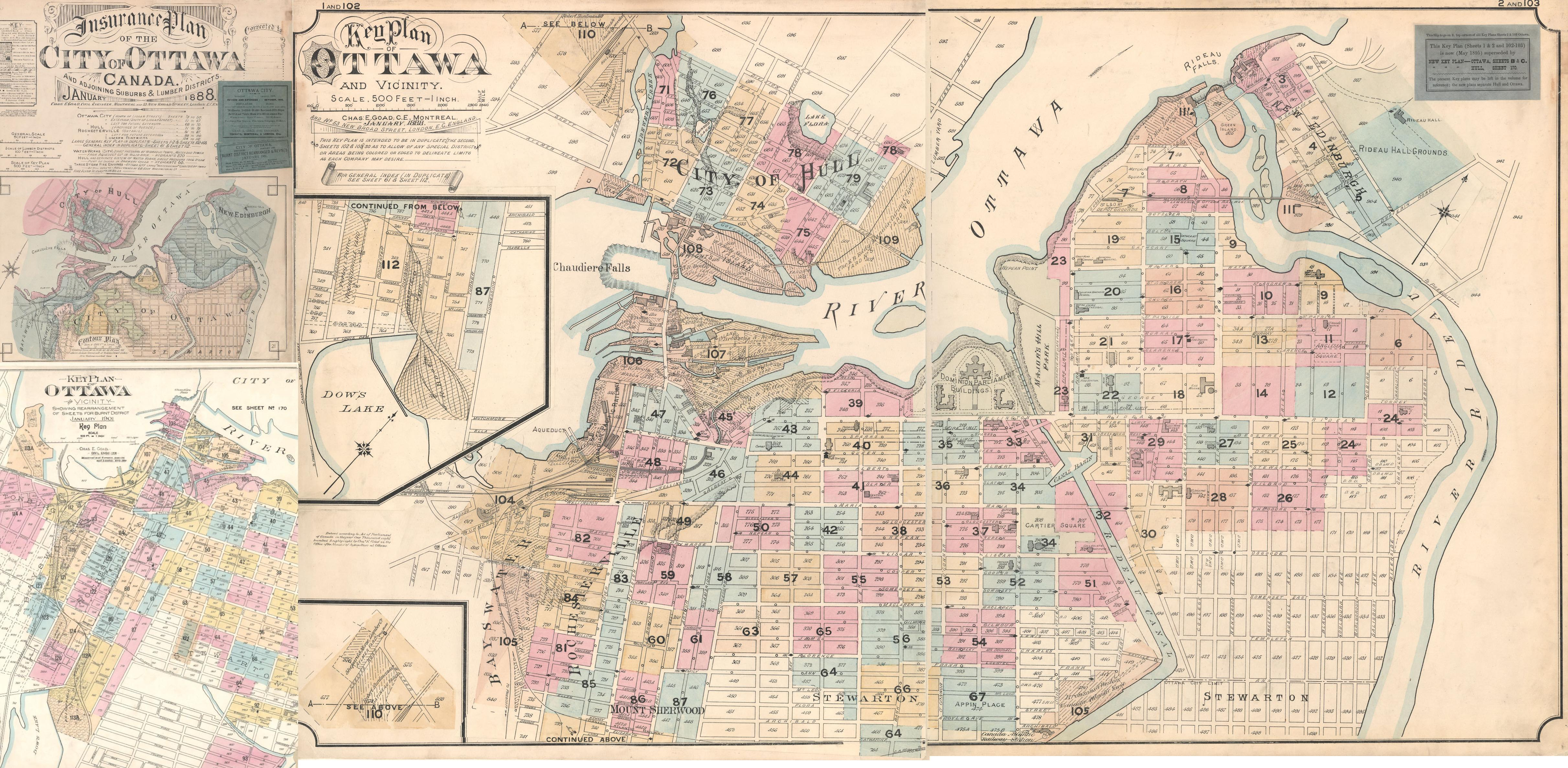
Map of the City of Ottawa Insurance Plan, 1888–1901 with business names and locations indicated

=== Ottawa – Central End ===
- Ashburnham – residential area downtown, bordered by Wellington St, Lyon St., Laurier Ave. and the Lebreton Aqueduct
- Mount Sherwood – 19th-century community located around where the Adult High School on Gladstone is today
- Nanny Goat Hill – 19th-century community today part of the LeBreton Flats, located at the foot of the eponymous Nanny Goat Hill
- Parkview – today part of The Glebe
- Rideauville – today part of Old Ottawa South
- Rochesterville – today makes up Centretown West
- Stewarton – today makes up The Glebe and Centretown

=== Ottawa – East End ===
- Clandeboye – today part of Vanier
- Clarkstown – today part of Vanier
- Cummings Bridge – today part of Vanier
- Eastview Centre – today part of Vanier
- Finter – today part of Viscount Alexander Park
- Village of Gloucester – today part of the Lindenlea neighbourhood south of New Edinburgh
- Janeville – see Vanier
- Rockcliffe Annex – today part of Viscount Alexander Park
- Rockville – also known as Rock Village, this neighbourhood developed around Gloucester Quarries opened by Antoine Robillard on Montreal Road

=== Ottawa – South End ===
- Bowesville – today part of the Macdonald-Cartier International Airport
- Brookfield – today part of Riverside Park
- Chaudiere Junction – Railway junction near Bank and Walkley
- Gateville – located just south of Billings Bridge
- Gloucester Station – located near High Road and Earl Armstrong Road
- Hawthorne – Hawthorne & Russell Road, today close to Hawthorne Meadows
- Hurdman Bridge – area near Hurdman Station
- Willowdale – today part of the Eastway Gardens neighbourhood

=== Ottawa – West End ===
- Bayswater – today part of the Hintonburg neighbourhood
- Baytown – today part of the Westboro neighbourhood
- Birchton – today part of the Westboro neighbourhood
- Britanniaville – included what is today the neighbourhood of Britannia
- Evansville – today located in the neighbourhood of Carlington
- McLeansville – today part of Tunney's Pasture
- Merivale Village – today part of Carlington
- Nepeanville – located where the Central Experimental Farm is today

=== Ottawa – Others ===
- Bells Corners Station – close to Highway 416 and Baseline Road
- Blackburn – today part of Blackburn Hamlet
- Blackburn Station – area near Anderson Road and Renaud Road
- Cathartic – also known as Eastman's Springs; see Carlsbad Springs.
- Daniston – today part of Orleans
- Eagleson Corners – today part of Kanata
- Fallowfield Station – area near Cedarview Road and Strandherd Drive. Not to be confused with the current Fallowfield Station
- Federal Station – Prince of Wales Dr and Colonnade Road area
- Graham Bay Station – area near Richmond Road and Highway 417
- Hazeldean – today part of Katimavik-Hazeldean, Kanata
- Long Island Village – located opposite the north end of Long Island near the community of Manotick
- Merivale Station – area near Fallowfield Station
- St. Joseph – see Orleans
- Wellington – see Kars

== Main communities ==
This is a list of the main communities in the Ottawa area along with population numbers.

=== Greater areas and CMAs ===
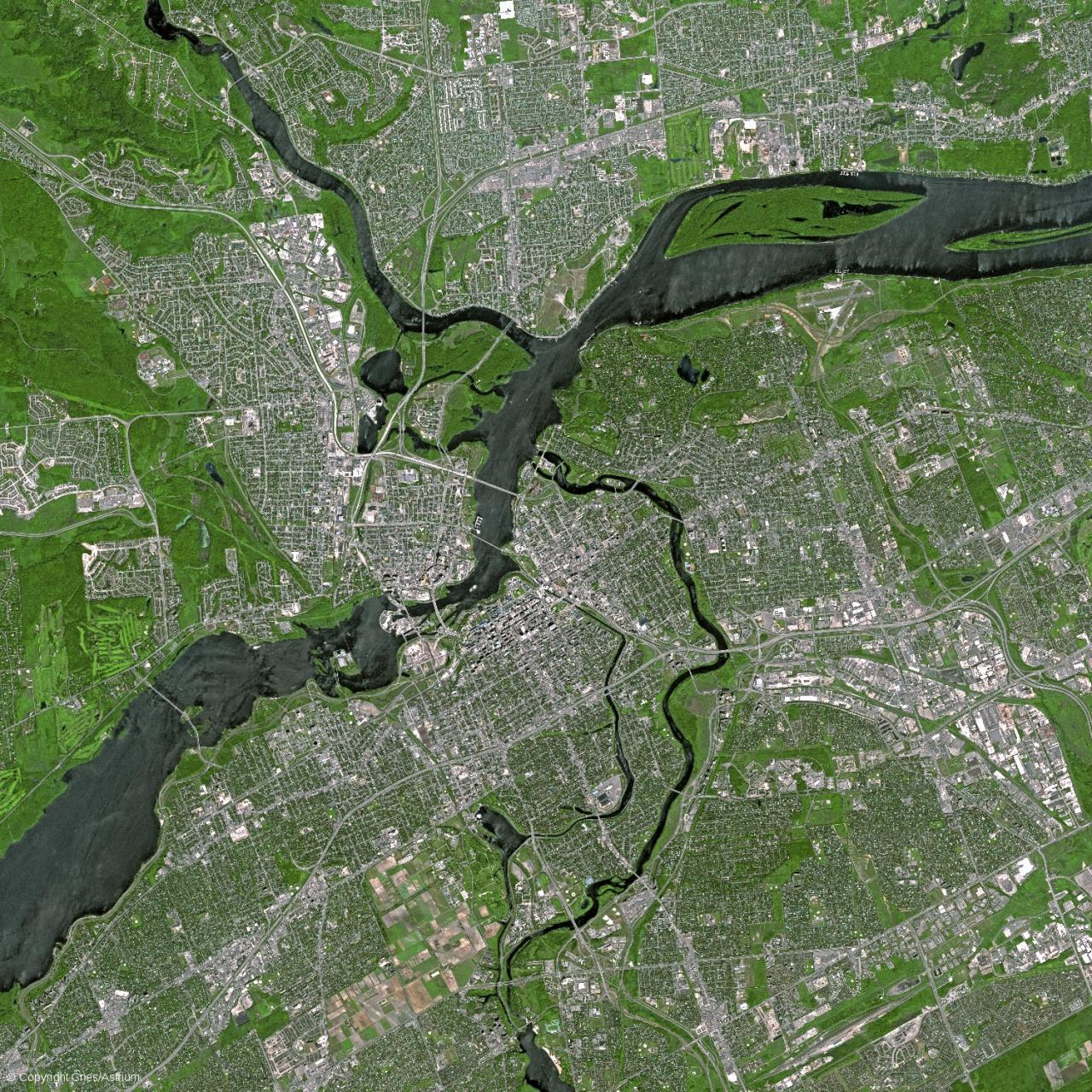
National Capital Region by SPOT Satellite in 2003

- Greater Ottawa-Gatineau Area population, year-end 2006: (pop. 1,316,830)
- Ottawa-Gatineau CMA, mid-2006: (pop. 1,158,314)

=== Cities ===
- Ottawa – (pop. 1,000,000)
- Gatineau – (pop. 242,124)

Former cities

- Ottawa (pop. 382,076) (Downtown Ottawa, The Glebe, Centretown, Lower Town, Sandy Hill, Billings Bridge)
- Cumberland (pop. 52,430) (former township, became city in 1999)
- Gloucester (pop. 110,264) (former township, became city in 1981)
- Kanata (pop. 90,000) (merger of March, parts of Goulbourn and parts of Nepean)
- Nepean (pop. 124,878) (former township, became city in 1978)
- Vanier (pop. 17,632) (formerly known as Eastview)

Former villages

- Rockcliffe Park (pop. 1,927)

Former townships

- Goulbourn
- Osgoode
- Rideau (merger of Marlborough and North Gower)
- West Carleton (merger of Torbolton, Fitzroy and Huntley)

==== Other main suburban areas ====
- Orleans (pop. 100,000) (located in the former cities of Cumberland and Gloucester)
- Barrhaven (pop. 70,000) (located in the former city of Nepean)
- Stittsville (pop. 18,913) (located in the former township of Goulbourn)
- Bells Corners (pop. 9,720)
- Blackburn Hamlet (pop. 8,955)
- Hunt Club (pop. 13,000)
- Morgan's Grant (pop. 8,000)
- Riverside South (pop. 8,000)
- Riverview (pop. 11,704)

==== Rural villages and hamlets ====
- Dalmeny, Ontario (pop. unknown)
- Antrim (pop. unknown)
- Corkery (pop. unknown)
- Dwyer Hill (pop. unknown)
- Burritts Rapids (pop. 100)
- Ashton (pop. 108)
- Galetta (pop. 177)
- Dunrobin (pop. 288)
- Kinburn (pop. 288)
- Kenmore (pop. 321)
- Fallowfield (pop. 366)
- Edwards (pop. 402)
- Sarsfield (pop. 474)
- Vernon (pop. 597)
- Kars (pop. 648)
- Fitzroy Harbour (pop. 654)
- Marionville (pop est. 900)
- Vars (pop. 981)
- Munster (pop. 1,320)
- Carp (pop. 1,416)
- Navan (pop. 1,593)
- North Gower (pop. 1,749)
- Cumberland (pop. 1,884)
- Metcalfe (pop. 2,070)
- Constance Bay (pop. 2,619)
- Osgoode (pop. 2,784)
- Richmond (pop. 3,301)
- Greely (pop. 4,395)
- Manotick (pop. 7,545)
- Carlsbad Springs (pop. 916)
- Piperville (pop. 593)

== See also ==
- List of roads in Ottawa
