= Dalmeny (disambiguation) =

Dalmeny can refer to:

- Dalmeny, a village and parish in Scotland
- Dalmeny, New South Wales, a coastal town in Australia
- Dalmeny, Ontario, a community in Canada
- Dalmeny, Saskatchewan, a town in Canada
- Lord Dalmeny, title used by the heir to the Earl of Rosebery.
