= Viscount Alexander =

Viscount Alexander may refer to:

- Viscount Alexander of Tunis, subsidiary title of the Earl Alexander of Tunis
  - Harold Alexander, 1st Earl Alexander of Tunis, Governor General of Canada 1946–52
  - École Viscount Alexander, his namesake middle school in Winnipeg
  - Viscount Alexander Park, his namesake neighbourhood in East Ottawa
- Viscount Alexander, courtesy title of the heir apparent to the Earl of Caledon
- Viscount Alexander of Hillsborough, subsidiary title of A. V. Alexander, 1st Earl Alexander of Hillsborough
