= List of neighbourhoods in Kingston, Ontario =

The City of Kingston has defined 45 distinct neighbourhoods based on census data from Statistics Canada. Different from the city's twelve electoral districts, the neighbourhoods as defined by the City all share common socio-demographic characteristics. Detailed socio-demographic information on the city can be found in the Kingston Community Profile, 2009: A Socio-Demographic Analysis of Kingston, Ontario Canada. The profile is published by the Social Planning Council of Kingston and District (SPCKD). While some of these neighbourhoods have established their own business improvement area, others are simply a designation given by the City of Kingston in recognition of their distinct attributes and characteristics

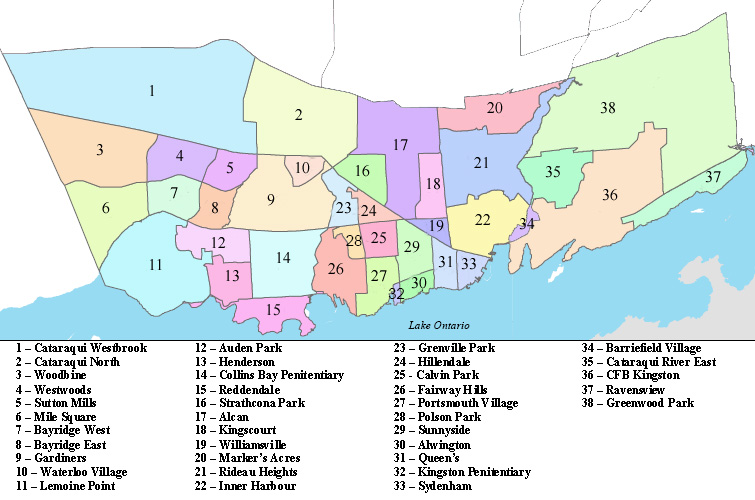
Map of Kingston, Ontario

.

The divisions are arbitrary; they follow census boundaries but often chop existing, recognised neighbourhoods (including the central business district) in two.

== Downtown and inner suburbs ==
These points (and a few others, including Polson Park, Rideau Heights and Alcan), if not part of the original city, were annexed to Kingston from Kingston Township or the former village of Portsmouth no later than the 1950s.

Sydenham	Queen's	Inner Harbour	Alwington
Sunnyside	Williamsville	Kingscourt	Kingston Penitentiary
Portsmouth Village	Calvin Park	Hillendale

== Kingston - West ==
Most (but not all) of these points were in the former Township of Kingston, annexed on January 1, 1998. The pre-amalgamation boundary is Cataraqui Creek.

Auden Park	Bayridge East	Bayridge West	Cataraqui North
Cataraqui Westbrook	Collins Bay Penitentiary	Fairway Hills	Gardiners/Meadowbrook
Grenville Park	Henderson	Lemoine Point	Miles Square
Polson Park	Reddendale	Strathcona Park	Sutton Mills
Waterloo Village	Westwoods	Woodbine

== Kingston - East ==
Most of these points were in the former Pittsburgh Township, annexed on January 1, 1998. The pre-amalgamation boundary is the Cataraqui River.

Barriefield Village	Cataraqui River East	CFB Kingston	Greenwood
Joyceville-Brewer's Mills	Kingston Mills	Ravensview	St. Lawrence

== Kingston - North ==
Many or most of these points (except for those south of the 401) were in the former Township of Kingston, annexed on January 1, 1998.

Alcan	Elginburg-Silvers Corners	Glenburnie	Markers Acres
Rideau Heights	Shannon's Corners	Sharpton-Glenvale
