= Piperville =

- Rural community
- Interactive map of Piperville
- Coordinates: 45.34618°N 75.51523°W
- Country: Canada
- Province: Ontario
- Municipal Administration: City of Ottawa (since 2001)

Area
  - Total: 42.16 km^{2} (16.28 sq mi)

Population (2016)
  - Total: 593

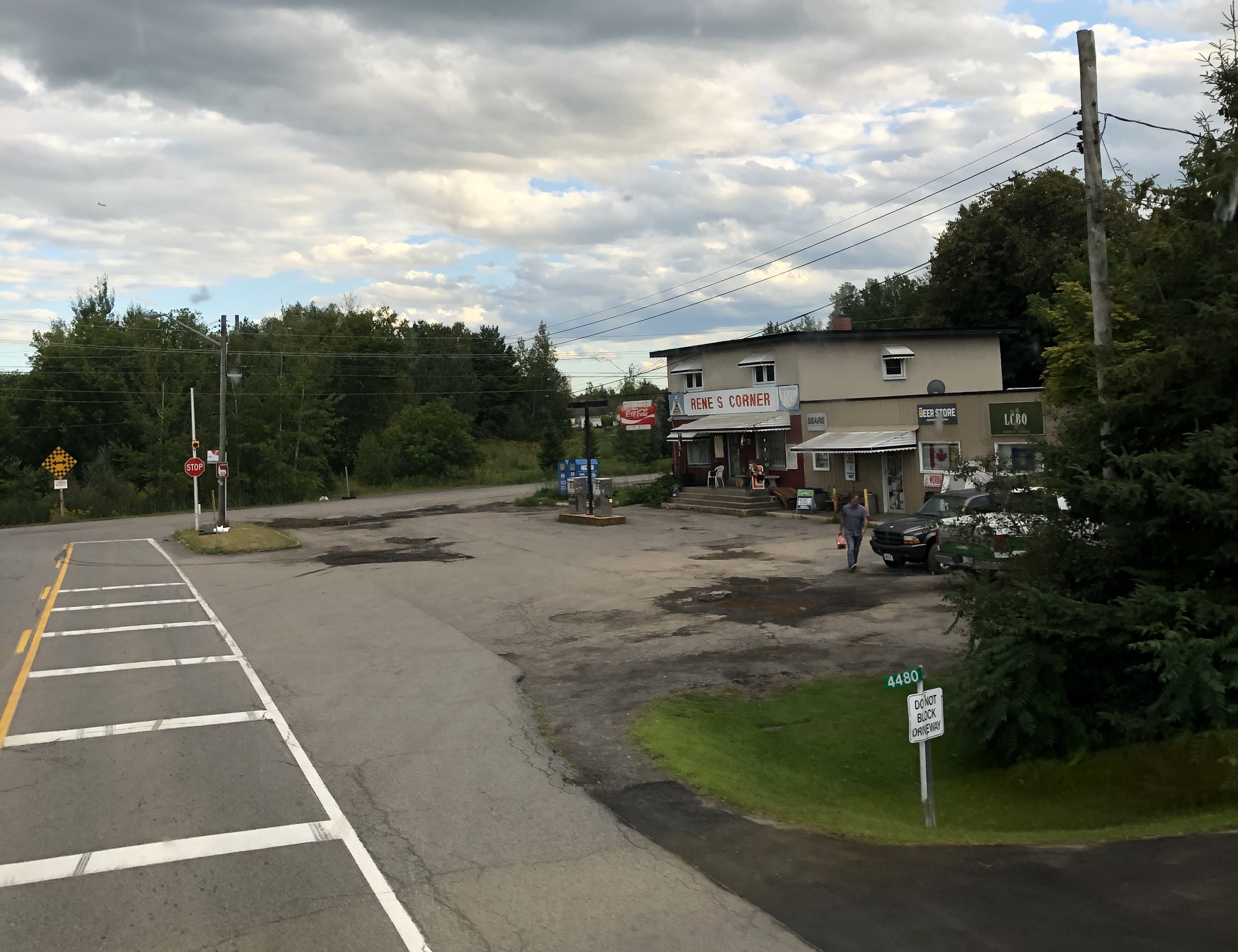
The intersection of Anderson Rd. and Piperville Rd. in Piperville, Carlsbad Springs.

Piperville is a small rural community in Osgoode Ward in Ottawa, Ontario, Canada, about 4 kilometres southwest of Carlsbad Springs and 16 kilometres southeast of Downtown Ottawa.

== History ==
Piperville was originally marshland, with what is now Russell road having been used as a trail for Algonquins on their way north to bring goods into Ottawa. The swamp was partially drained in the early 1880s by the Canada Atlantic Railway Company to make land usable for pastures. A train station opened in 1901 and closed in 1957. Its opening significantly increased Piperville’s population. However, the area was impoverished, largely due to low crop yields as a result of poor soil quality. Imperfect drainage of the swamp resulted in formations of leda clay deposits. The poor quality gleyed melanic brunisol soil, in combination with inflated land prices due to its proximity to Ottawa as well as its railway connections to New York and Montreal, resulted in the impoverishment of most of Piperville’s population. For example, after a plot of land was sold to a Romanian Jewish immigrant in Piperville in 1909, a Jewish Colonisation Association Colonist Report remarked as follows:

“Is farming in the neighbourhood of Ottawa since 1905, and purchased this farm in 1909 for $500, which is rather excessive. Land very poor: does not appear to raise much crop.”

The leda clay deposits found in Piperville inhibit major development, as the clay liquifies from stress caused by immense weight. This has limited structures to two-stories and prevented the development of various projects, including apartment buildings and solar plants, since the 1960s. The community's corner store made an appearance in the movie House at the End of the Street in 2012. In 2013, local residents voted to change the names of Eighth and Ninth Line roads to Piperville Road and Thunder Road. The local bus was destroyed in 2015 when it blew up on its morning route down Piperville road while picking up passengers at Ludger Landry park. In 2017, the community centre was abandoned as a result of excessive costs related to environmental soil contamination, including a former on-site underground storage tank (UST) and suspected unknown fill material, and the outdoor ice rink was demolished. In August 2019, the building and six-acre lot were purchased by Saint Mesrob Armenian Apostolic Church. The building was renovated in 2021 at a cost of $190000. In 2021, development began on a state-of-the-art soccer facility at the Maple Leaf Almrausch German Club on Farmers Way.

== Community Information ==
The federal government has classified Piperville as a “dispersed rural community” located in the Gloucester area. Ludger Landry Park has public amenities such as a playground, baseball field, soccer pitch, and gazebo. Anderson Links is a golf course in the community. There are also snowmobile trails as well as a cross-country ski trail. In addition to Piperville Road and Thunder Road, notable roadways include Hall Road, Farmers Way, Leitrim Road, Anderson Road, and Russell Road. The provincial government places the centre of the community at the intersection of Piperville Rd and Farmers Way. Piperville is also home to older residents, including a 55+ adult living community. Piperville has a significant Hells Angels presence. The community radio station is CJRO-FM.

== Public Transportation ==
OC Transpo line 222 to Vars, Ontario runs through Piperville, connecting it to O-Train Line 1 via Blair station Monday to Friday. There is no weekend service. Buses stop at Anderson / Leitrim, Anderson / Piperville (shown in photo), Landry Park, 4898 Piperville, 4992 Piperville, Piperville / Farmers, 5554 Piperville, Piperville / Hall, and 5866 Piperville. The following is the bus schedule at Piperville / Landry Park (1571) as of 5 August 2020:

Piperville
Destination	Scheduled stop time
Blair Station	6:24 AM
Blair Station	6:57 AM
Blair Station	7:26 AM
Vars	4:27 PM
Vars	5:01 PM
Vars	5:58 PM

== Notable people ==
- Wesley Woodland McLatchie (1888-1961), served in the Royal Canadian Air Force during the First World War and subsequently served 28 years in the United States Secret Service
