= Raymond Desjardins =

Senior research scientist at Agriculture and Agri-Food Canada

Raymond Desjardins CM OOnt FRSC
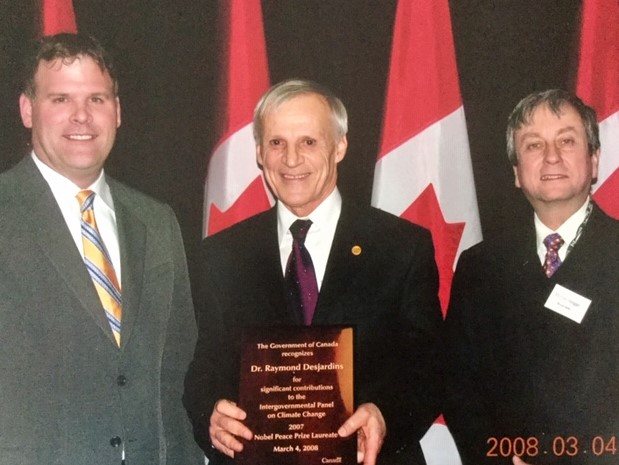
- Desjardins (centre) receiving an award from the Canadian government, by John Baird to the left, for his work for the IPPC
- Education: University of Ottawa; University of Toronto; Cornell University
- Employer: Agriculture and Agri-Food Canada

Raymond L. Desjardins CM OOnt FRSC is a senior research scientist at Agriculture and Agri-Food Canada (AAFC) in the Agrienvironment Division of the Ottawa Research and Development Centre. His areas of expertise include agricultural meteorology, micrometeorology, air quality, and climate change. He is a Fellow of the Royal Society of Canada, was co-recipient of the Nobel Peace Prize awarded to the Intergovernmental Panel on Climate Change (IPCC) in 2007, and in 2018 was appointed as Member of the Order of Canada for his research in agrometeorology and for his innovative devices to quantify greenhouse gas (GHG) emissions.

== Biography ==
Raymond Desjardins was born and raised on a farm in Carlsbad Springs, Ontario and now lives in Breckenridge (Pontiac), Quebec. In 1963, he obtained a BSc (Hons.) in Physics from the University of Ottawa. He obtained an MSc in meteorology from the University of Toronto in 1965 and a PhD in Micrometeorology from Cornell University in 1972.

In 1965 Desjardins began working as a research scientist at AAFC where he spearheaded many research projects that have advanced knowledge and enabled Canada to lead the way in international efforts to fight climate change. He was principal resource officer for a CIDA project in Londrina, Brazil from 1983 to 1987. From 1985 to 1998, he was adjunct professor at Laval and McGill University. He also served as a scientific advisor in agrometeorological research for the province of Quebec from 1980 to 1990. Desjardins continues to work at AAFC; some of his most recent research has focused on quantifying the carbon footprint of agricultural products and identifying ways the agricultural sector could reduce its greenhouse gas emissions.

== Career ==
Desjardins has led many climate change projects related to Canadian agriculture. As part of Canada's Green Plan Program, in cooperation with three other researchers, he co-edited the much acclaimed book, The Health of Our Air: Toward sustainable agriculture in Canada. This book assesses the contribution of Canadian agriculture to air quality and climate change.

Desjardins was the agricultural team leader on the Program of Energy Research and Development (PERD) from 1987 to 2007. During that period, he managed the PERD climate change project with representatives from the five Natural Resource Departments. He co-authored the interdepartmental report, Enhancement of Greenhouse Gas Sinks: A Science Assessment. As part of Action Plan 2000, he proposed the GHG Mitigation Program for Canadian Agriculture whose objectives were to increase awareness among the farming community of climate change issues and help producers reduce their impact on the environment. He chaired the scientific advisory committee that worked closely with the Dairy Farmers of Canada, Canadian Pork Council, Canadian Cattlemen's Association, and Soil Conservation Council of Canada to satisfy the burgeoning agriculture-sector interest in climate change and help minimize the impact of climate change on farming communities in Canada. He co-led the Model Farm project that carried out research across the country at the farm level as part of the GHG Mitigation Program. The results of this research were summarized in a book entitled: Better Farming, Better Air – A Scientific Analysis of Farming Practice and Greenhouse Gases in Canada which he co-edited. As part of the Model Farm project, he and his colleagues developed the first version of the GHG calculator HOLOS which can be used to calculate the GHG emissions from any farm in Canada.

Throughout his career, Desjardins was a key player in major national and international scientific projects to quantify the functioning of terrestrial ecosystems and their role in greenhouse gas exchange. He led the first team to measure carbon dioxide fluxes using an aircraft-based platform. This technology, which was featured on the cover of Science, has been used to study some of the major terrestrial ecosystems in North America. With this aircraft, he was a participant in the NASA funded First ISLSCP Field Experiment (FIFE) over the Konza prairies in Kansas in 1987 and 1989. He worked closely with scientists in many large scale experiments such as the Northern Wetlands Study (NOWES) in 1990, the California Ozone Deposition Experiment (CODE) in 1991, the Boreal Ecosystem Atmosphere Study (BOREAS) in northern Canada in 1994 and 1996, the Southern Great Plain Experiment (SGP97) in Oklahoma, and the MacKenzie Basin Study (MAGS) near Inuvik in 1999. He built many unique sampling systems to measure the fluxes of trace gases. One of his latest systems was used on the National Research Council atmospheric research aircraft to measure the emissions of nitrous oxide and methane at a regional scale. These measurements have greatly increased national and international confidence in the Canadian agricultural GHG emission inventory estimates.

Desjardins has more than 30 years experience working with the Commission for Agricultural Meteorology of the World Meteorological Organization, publishing papers on climate change, leading a team to disseminate knowledge on the impact of agriculture on climate, and helping transfer agricultural technologies to developing countries. He was a member of the management team from 2014 to 2018.

Desjardins also worked with the IPCC on working Group II.

Over the course of his career, Desjardins has been a mentor to many young Canadians and foreign researchers.

== Honours and awards ==
- 1995 “Agriculture Excellence Award” for his leadership role in First ISLSCP Field Experiment (FIFE)
- 1999 Fellow of Canadian Society of Agricultural Meteorology
- 1999 Fellow of American Society of Agronomy
- 2000 Fellow of Agricultural Institute of Canada
- 2001 “Science Award to the Leaders of Sustainable Development”
- 2002 Co-recipient of “Norbert Gerbier - MUMM International Award” World Meteorological Organization
- 2008 Recognized by the Government of Canada for his contributions to Intergovernmental Panel on Climate Change (IPCC) 2007 Nobel Peace Prize Laureate
- 2008 “Award of Excellence” from Public Service of Canada
- 2009 “Gold Harvest Award” from Agriculture and Agri-Food Canada
- 2010 Award for “Outstanding Achievement in Biometeorology” from American Meteorological Society
- 2010 Award for Exceptional Service to the Commission of Agricultural Meteorology of the World Meteorological Organization (Brazil)
- 2011 Fellow of the Royal Society of Canada
- 2012 Queen Elizabeth II Diamond Jubilee Medal for his national and international contributions to science
- 2012 Special session at the American Meteorological Society, Atmospheric Biogeoscience Conference
- 2018 Award for Exceptional Service to CAgM of the World Meteorological Organization (Korea)
- 2018 Member of the Order of Canada
- 2020 Member of the Order of Ontario
