= CJRO-FM =

Community radio station in Ontario, Canada

- Carlsbad Springs, Ontario; Canada
- Frequency: 107.7 MHz

Programming
- Format: Community radio

Ownership
- Owner: CJRO Radio Inc.

History
- First air date: January 11, 2020

Technical information
- Licensing authority: CRTC
- Class: LP
- ERP: around 15 watts

Links
- Website: cjroradio.com

CJRO-FM is a radio station which broadcasts a community radio format on 107.7 FM in Carlsbad Springs, Ontario, Canada.

== History ==
The station originally began as a tourist information radio station in 2017.

Owned by CJRO Radio inc, the station received CRTC approval to operate a low-power, english and french-language community FM radio station in Carlsbad Springs, Ontario, and with a low-power FM rebroadcasting transmitter in Vars on May 7, 2019.

The station officially launched on January 11, 2020 and also operates an FM rebroadcaster on 107.9 FM at Vars, Ontario. On November 9, 2020, the station received CRTC approval to add another FM transmitter in Embrun, Ontario at 107.7 MHz (channel 299LP) with an effective radiated power of 40 watts (non-directional antenna with an effective height of the antenna above average terrain of 69 metres).

On May 3, 2021, Carlsbad Springs Community Association applied to add a new FM transmitter at Sarsfield, Ontario which would operate at 107.9 MHz with only two watts of power. The CRTC approved the application on October 4, 2021.

CJRO Radio is a low power bilingual community non-profit FM radio station that promotes local and regional events, provides important information and news to residents and the public in south-east rural Ottawa and the Russell Municipality. CJRO is licensed by the CRTC to play music (Rock, Country, French pop and Celtic music). It's available on 107.7 FM in Carlsbad Springs and Embrun and in the village of Vars and Sarsfield on 107.9 FM.

CJRO Radio is owned and operated by CJRO Radio inc., a non profit incorporation manage by a volunteer board members. CJRO Radio broadcast from a studio inside the Carlsbad Springs Community Centre at 6020 Piperville Road in Carlsbad Springs from an antenna broadcasting on 107.7 FM located at Harkness park, another antenna broadcasting on 107.7 FM located at the Russell Township Municipal building and another antenna in the heart of the village of Vars on 107.9 FM.

CJRO started in 2017 as "Carlsbad Info Radio" as a tourist information station and applied to change its mandate to a community radio format in 2018. It obtained its license from the CRTC in May 2019 and added a transmitter to service Vars on 107.9 FM. CJRO Radio added a new transmitter in Embrun, Ontario to serve the Russell Municipality also on 107.7 FM. The transmitter was installed and operational in June 2021. The CRTC approved the new Embrun transmitter on November 9, 2020. In October 2021 the CRTC approved a 4th transmitter for CJRO Radio to broadcast on 107.9 FM in Sarsfield in eastern rural Ottawa.

On May 26, 2022, the CRTC approved an application by CJRO Radio Inc. for authorization to acquire from Carlsbad Springs Community Association the assets of the low-power english and french-language community radio station CJRO-FM Carlsbad Springs, Ontario, and its transmitters CJRO-FM-1 Vars, CJRO-FM-2 Embrun and CJRO-FM-3 Sarsfield, Ontario.

On June 13, 2022, CJRO Radio Inc. submitted an application to operate a new FM transmitter at Casselman, Ontario on 107.9 MHz which was approved on December 20, 2022.

On August 20, 2025, CJRO Radio Inc. submitted an application to change the FM frequency for CJRO-FM-4 Casselman from 107.9 MHz at 2 watts to 96.3 MHz at 50 watts. CJRO received approval to change CJRO-FM-4's FM frequency from 107.9 MHz to 96.3 MHz on December 16, 2025.

In December 2025, CJRO-FM's branding is known as The Beat or Le Beat in French. Also in December 2025, CJRO-FM submitted an application to the CRTC to operate a new FM transmitter at 95.7 MHz to serve all of eastern rural Ottawa. The 95.7 MHz frequency became available in October 2025 after the closure of the aboriginal radio station ELMNT FM (CFPO-FM) in Ottawa.

In April 2026, five-time award-winning radio personality Brandon “DJ Immortal” Brown joined CJRO-FM as an on-air announcer. He currently hosts “The Vortex”, airing Mondays and Wednesdays from 7:00–9:00 p.m. and Saturdays from 3:00–5:00 p.m. Months later in October 2026, Brown was promoted to "Radio Sales & Marketing Manager" where he is now an official employee of CJRO-FM

== Transmitters ==
Rebroadcasters of CJRO-FM
City of licence	Identifier	Frequency	Power	RECNet	CRTC Decision
Vars	CJRO-FM-1	107.9 FM	10 watts	Query	2019-133
Embrun	CJRO-FM-2	107.7 FM	40 watts	Query	2020-369
Sarsfield	CJRO-FM-3	107.9 FM	20 watts	Query	2021-336
Casselman	CJRO-FM-4	96.3 FM	50 watts	Query	2022-345
