= Huntley Township, Ontario =

Township in Ontario, Canada

Coordinates: 45°18′N 76°03′W

Map of City of Ottawa showing Huntley Twp.

Huntley is a former incorporated and now geographic township in Carleton County in eastern Ontario, Canada.

Huntley was located in the western part of the county, bordered to the northwest by Fitzroy Township, to the northeast by March Township, to the southwest by Ramsay Township and to the southeast by Goulbourn Township. It includes the communities of Carp, Corkery, Huntley, Manion Corners, and Westwood.

According to the Canada 2021 Census, the Township had a population of 10,922.

== History ==
The township was surveyed in 1818 and the first settlers arrived shortly thereafter. The township was incorporated in 1850. The first settlers in the area were immigrants from Ireland in the early 19th century. Huntley took its name from Huntly Castle, associated with Charlotte Lennox, Duchess of Richmond, whose husband Charles served as Governor General of British North America from 1818 to 1819.

By 1866, there was a Post Office in the township of Huntley and John Graham served as postmaster.

In 1974, it was amalgamated with Torbolton and Fitzroy to form West Carleton. In 2001, West Carleton became part of the new city of Ottawa.

== Reeves ==
- 1850 J.E. Fenton
- 1853 Henry McBride
- 1862 John Holmes
- 1869 John Caldwell
- 1874 Edward Armstrong
- 1875 John Holmes
- 1876 Edward Armstrong
- 1889 George Nelson Kidd
- 1894 A. Hodgkins
- 1897 n/a
- 1907 G.A. Hodgkins
- 1911 Robert Cox
- 1923 William Rivington
- 1947 William J. Cox
- 1949 E.F. Johnston
- 1956 J.A. Boyd
- 1968 Glen Rivington

== See also ==
- List of townships in Ontario
