= Hunt Club =

- Neighbourhood
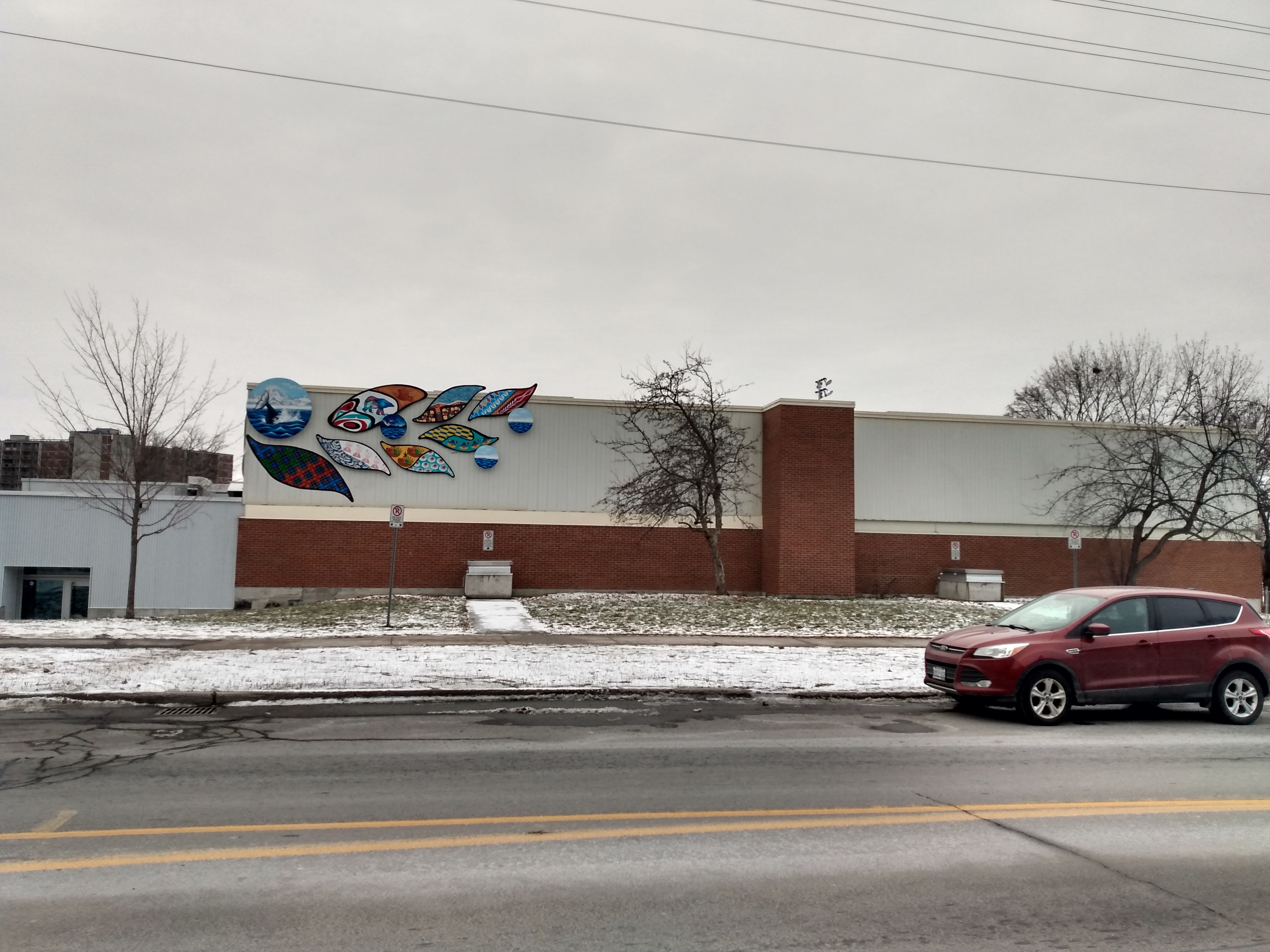
- Hunt Club-Riverside Park Community Centre

- Location within Ottawa
- Coordinates: 45.350°N 75.675°W
- Country: Canada
- Province: Ontario
- City: Ottawa

Government
  - MPs: David McGuinty
  - MPPs: John Fraser
  - Councillors: Riley Brockington
  - Governing body: Hunt Club Community Association
  - President: Audrey Bélanger Baur

Area
  - Total: 5.072 km^{2} (1.958 sq mi)
- Elevation: 95 m (312 ft)

Population (2016)
  - Total: 12,264
  - Density: 2,418/km^{2} (6,260/sq mi)
- Canada 2016 Census
- Time zone: UTC-5 (Eastern (EST))
- Forward sortation area: K1V
- Website: Community Association

Hunt Club is a community in River Ward, in the south end of Ottawa, Ontario, Canada. The area is named after the Ottawa Hunt and Golf Club, which was first developed in 1876. Hunt Club Road and many local businesses were also named after the golf course.

Hunt Club is located just north of the Ottawa Macdonald–Cartier International Airport and to the east of the Rideau River. The Hunt Club Community Organization defines the boundaries as the Rideau River to the west, the Airport Parkway to the east, the CN Albion line and Via Rail Beachburg Subdivision to the north, and Hunt Club Road to the south. The population of the area is 12,264 as of the 2016 Canadian census.

16% of the community area is marked as accessible green space including the Sawmill Creek wetlands and Rideau River shoreline.

Hunt Club contains seven city parks: Cahill, McCarthy, Owl, Paul Landry, Riverwood, Uplands, and Uplands Riverside.

Hunt Club has a mixed demographic in terms of age groups, ethnocultural backgrounds, socio-economic levels, and family set-ups. The area also has the second-largest Asian Canadian population in Ottawa. Housing in the area includes single dwellings, semi-detached and townhouse units, apartment buildings, retirement homes, and housing projects.

Hunt Club was originally settled by Europeans in the early nineteenth century, and it was originally part of Gloucester Township. In 1950, the still largely rural area was annexed into the city of Ottawa. Development of the area began in the 1970s, and many houses and buildings in the area are from this period. It was designed as a bedroom community with little commercial space.

== Sub neighbourhoods ==
(from west to east)

- Quinterra
- Hunt Club Woods
- Hunt Club Estate
- Western Community

== See also ==
- List of Ottawa neighbourhoods
