= Williamsville, Kingston =

Neighborhood in Canada

Coordinates: 44.239°N 76.500°W

Williamsville is a neighbourhood located in downtown Kingston, Ontario, Canada. The neighbourhood is bounded by Concession Street to the north, Johnson Street to the south and Sir John A Macdonald Blvd to the west, and Division Street to the east. Williamsville is represented on the City Council by counsellor Vincent Cinanni and is also home to the Williamsville Community Association, a local advocacy group committed to the interests of Williamsville's residents, businesses, and agencies.

As one of the original neighbourhoods of the City of Kingston, Williamsville is home to several good examples of local Limestone, Victorian, and Craftsman-Style architecture. The neighbourhood is also known for being the childhood home of Don Cherry. Following the completion of Ontario Highway 401 and declining usage of Ontario Highway 2, the main thoroughfare through Kingston, economic prosperity declined in Williamsville beginning in the 1960s. As a result, Williamsville has been the subject of several revitalisation efforts based on the Williamsville Main Street Study. These efforts have led to extensive renovations to the Kingston Memorial Centre, significant investment in infrastructure along Princess Street along the Williamsville corridor, new residential development projects, and the addition of Kingston's second Farmers' Market.

== Events ==
Each year, Williamsville hosts several of Kingston's festivals, including the Kingston Fall Fair, the Kingston Ribfest & Craft Beer Show, and the Kingston Health & Fitness Expo.

== Notable attractions ==
- Kingston Memorial Centre
- Memorial Centre Farmers' Market

== Notable people ==
- Don Cherry
