= Watterson Corners =

Coordinates: 45.203°N 75.698°W

Location of Waterson Corners in Ontario

Waterson Corners (or Waterson's Corners) is a community in Rideau-Jock Ward in Ottawa, Ontario.
