= Manor Park, Ottawa =

Manor Park
- Neighbourhood
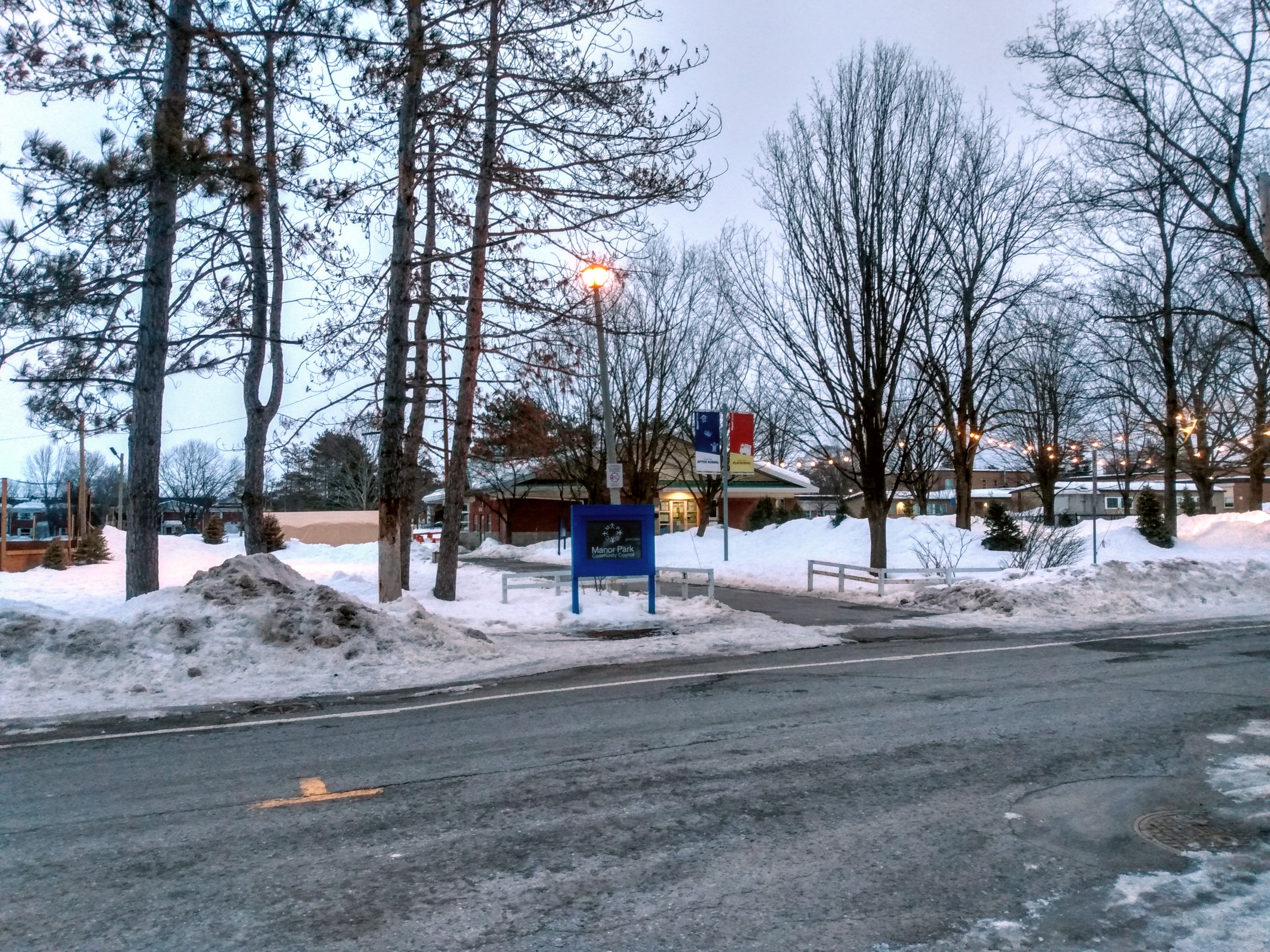
- Manor Park Community Council

- Location in Ottawa
- Coordinates: 45°27′10″N 75°39′30″W
- Country: Canada
- Province: Ontario
- City: Ottawa
- Established: 1947

Government
  - MP: Mona Fortier
  - MPPs: Lucille Collard
  - Councillors: Rawlson King
  - Governing body: Manor Park Community Association
  - President: Natalie Belovic

Area
  - Total: 2.901 km^{2} (1.120 sq mi)
- Elevation: 65 m (213 ft)

Population (2016)
  - Total: 7,716
  - Density: 2,660/km^{2} (6,889/sq mi)
- Canada 2016 Census
- Time zone: UTC−5 (Eastern (EST))
  - Summer (DST): UTC−4 (EDT)
- Forward sortation area: K1K
- Website: Community Association

Manor Park is a neighbourhood in Rideau-Rockcliffe Ward in the east end of Ottawa, Ontario, Canada on the east side of Rockcliffe Park.

The neighbourhood is bounded on the north by the Sir George-Étienne Cartier Parkway, on the east by the Aviation Parkway, on the south by Montreal Road and on the west by Birch Avenue. This area covers Census Tracts 5050060.00 and 5050059.00 which had a combined population of 7,716 as of the Canada 2016 Census.

It is an almost exclusively residential area, the great majority of its housing stock having been built in the late 1940s and early 1950s, by a consortium of five Ottawa area developers. Prior to its development, much of the land was slightly marshy treed area, used as riding trails stemming from nearby Mile Circle as well as the Royal Canadian Mounted Police stables, which remain nearby, and are the home of the Musical Ride. It is well treed, with some notable white pines scattered throughout.

The first development in what is now Manor Park appeared in the mid-1920s, and was known as Rockcliffe Annex. Following World War II, Manor Park was built over top of Rockcliffe Annex, becoming Ottawa's first post-war subdivision. The first families moved into the neighbourhood in 1947. When it was built, it was considered to be "Canada's first completely co-ordinated community".

The Village of Cardinal Glen sub-neighbourhood began to be built by Timberlay Homes in 1988.

A small pocket park is named Anthony Vincent Park, after a former Canadian diplomat. Notable local institutions include Manor Park Public School, and St. Columba Anglican Church.

== See also ==
- List of Ottawa neighbourhoods
