= Corkery, Ontario =

Coordinates: 45.2845°N 76.1036°W

Corkery is a dispersed rural community in West Carleton-March Ward in the western part of Ottawa, Canada. It is located about 9 km southwest of Carp, in the former Township of West Carleton.

Corkery was founded by approximately 100 Irish families from County Cork immigrating to the region in the early 19th century, locally known as the "Peter Robinson settlers".

The first church in the village was built in 1837, although some reports put it at 1824 which would make it the second-oldest Catholic church in the Ottawa region. Construction began in 1864 on a stone church meant to replace the wooden structure. On February 26, 1865 the church was completed and consecrated as St. Michael's Catholic Parish. The parish operated in debt for nearly two decades, until Rev. Patrick Corkery became minister in 1884, and spent the next twenty years improving and renovating the church.
