= Merivale Mall =

Shopping mall in Ottawa, Ontario, Canada

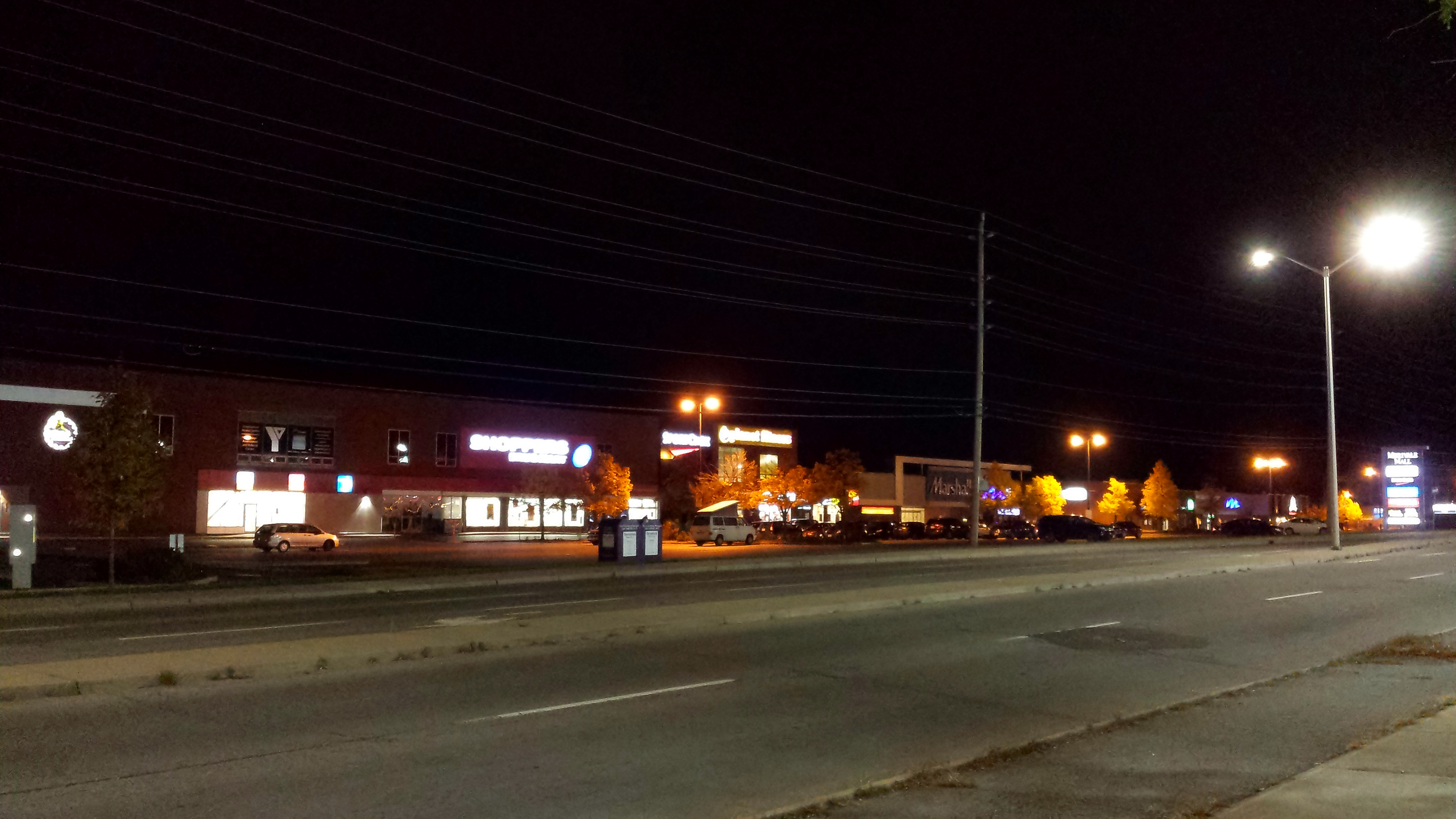
Merivale Mall at night

Merivale Mall is an indoor mall located at 1642 Merivale Road in the Nepean district of Ottawa, Ontario, Canada. The mall opened in 1976 and is bordered by Viewmount Drive to the south and Merivale Road to the east. It's an approximate 20-minute drive from Downtown Ottawa. Some of the shops and services currently located at the mall include Farm Boy, CIBC, Pizza Pizza, Shoppers Drug Mart, Sport Chek, and Planet Fitness. The mall is currently owned by First Capital Realty.

== Redevelopment ==
In February 2015, Merivale Mall announced that it would be undergoing a $10 million redevelopment. This redevelopment would include a new Marshalls location that would be 25,900 square feet. The redevelopment also included a relocated and redesigned Sport Chek. The projected was completed in Fall 2015.

== Tenants ==
Sport Chek is currently the longest-serving tenant of the mall, which opened in 1995 to replace the Woolco department store that moved out of the mall. Previously, Rockwell's Restaurant was the longest-serving tenant, being open since 1986 and closing in late December 2015. Farm Boy has been an anchor and second-oldest tenant of the mall since 1996 when it replaced the Dominion store. The mall featured an A Buck or Two until it converted into "Merivale Mart" in 2002, went out of business in 2007.

== Nearby amenities ==
- Merivale High School - The high school is located on the southeastern corner of the intersection of Merivale Road and Viewmount Drive.
- Viewmount Centre - An open-air shopping centre that is located on the east side of Merivale Road between Basil MacDonald Way and Viewmount Drive.
- Canadian Tire Gas Bar - A gas bar that is located on the southwestern corner of the intersection of Merivale Road and Viewmount Drive.
- Merivale Place - An open-air shopping centre located on the east side of Merivale Road between Meadowlands Drive and Family Brown Lane.
- Meadowlands Mall - An open-air shopping centre located on the northeastern corner of the intersection of Merivale Road and Meadowlands Drive.
- Emerald Plaza An office tower located at 1547 Merivale rd Near Meadowlands Drive .
