= Morewood, Ontario =

Village in North Dundas, Ontario, Canada

Morewood
- Village
- Location of Morewood in Ontario
- Country: Canada
- Province: Ontario
- County: Stormont, Dundas and Glengarry
- Municipality: North Dundas

Population (2021 estimate)
  - Total: 238
- Time zone: UTC−5 (EST)
  - Summer (DST): UTC−4 (EDT)

Morewood is a rural village in the municipality of North Dundas, located in the United Counties of Stormont, Dundas and Glengarry in eastern Ontario, Canada. The community lies in a primarily agricultural region characteristic of Eastern Ontario and is situated approximately 50 kilometres southeast of the national capital, Ottawa.

Morewood is one of several small communities in North Dundas, including Winchester, Chesterville, Inkerman, Mountain, and South Mountain.

== History ==
European settlement in the area now known as Morewood began in the late 18th and early 19th centuries, when United Empire Loyalists and other agricultural settlers established homesteads within what was then Dundas County.

The village formed as a service centre for the surrounding farmland, with general stores, post offices, and locally owned businesses serving area residents. By the mid‑20th century, light industrial activities, such as sash and door manufacturing, were part of the local economy. In 1991, a factory producing modular housing and cabinetry began operations in Morewood, contributing to employment opportunities for local residents.

== Geography and Environment ==
Morewood is situated within a rural agricultural landscape that includes cultivated fields, patches of woodland, and areas of wetland. The village is connected to neighbouring communities by county roads, including Ontario Highway 31, which provide access to settlements such as Winchester, Chesterville, and Brockville.

The surrounding region includes features like the Morewood Bog and the Alvin Runnalls Forest. These natural areas form part of the local ecosystem and are known for their ecological significance, supporting diverse flora and fauna. Seasonal environmental conditions, such as drought or wet periods, influence land use and conservation practices in the area.

== Demographics ==
Based on demographic estimates, Morewood has an approximate population of 238 residents. Data compiled on the community’s population indicates a small, stable settlement consistent with rural habitation patterns in eastern Ontario.

== Community and services ==
Community life in Morewood is supported by local facilities and volunteer organizations that host a variety of recreational and cultural events for residents. The village is home to the Morewood Community Centre, which serves as a venue for social gatherings and seasonal events such as winter carnivals and community celebrations.

Recreation amenities in the area include outdoor rinks and park spaces maintained by the Township of North Dundas, including seasonal skating at the Morewood outdoor rink and inclusive playground upgrades at Morewood Community Park.

Residents also participate in organized community initiatives through groups such as the Morewood Recreation Association, which hosts annual events like tree lightings and community gatherings that foster social engagement.

Children and families in Morewood are served by schools in the surrounding area administered by the Upper Canada District School Board, and many households travel to neighbouring communities for additional educational, commercial, and health services.

== Landmarks ==
A prominent local landmark is the Morewood Cenotaph, a war memorial dedicated in 1921 to honour residents who died during the First World War. Later plaques commemorate those who served in the Second World War and other conflicts. The cenotaph continues to serve as a focal point for annual Remembrance Day ceremonies and community reflection. Efforts by local volunteers to maintain and enhance the memorial have been documented in municipal records.

== Natural Events ==
The surrounding wetlands and peatland environments occasionally experience natural disturbances, such as wildfires during periods of severe drought, which are a characteristic feature of bog ecosystems. In 2025, a significant bog and forest fire in the Alvin Runnalls Forest near Morewood drew coordinated response efforts from municipal fire services and conservation authorities. The fire, which burned forest and peatland, was contained after sustained suppression efforts and rainfall, and the region’s State of Emergency was subsequently lifted.

== See also ==
- North Dundas
- Stormont, Dundas and Glengarry United Counties
- Eastern Ontario
- Dundas County, Ontario
- Ontario Highway 31
