= Carlsbad Springs, Ontario =

Rural community in Ottawa

Carlsbad Springs
- Unincorporated community
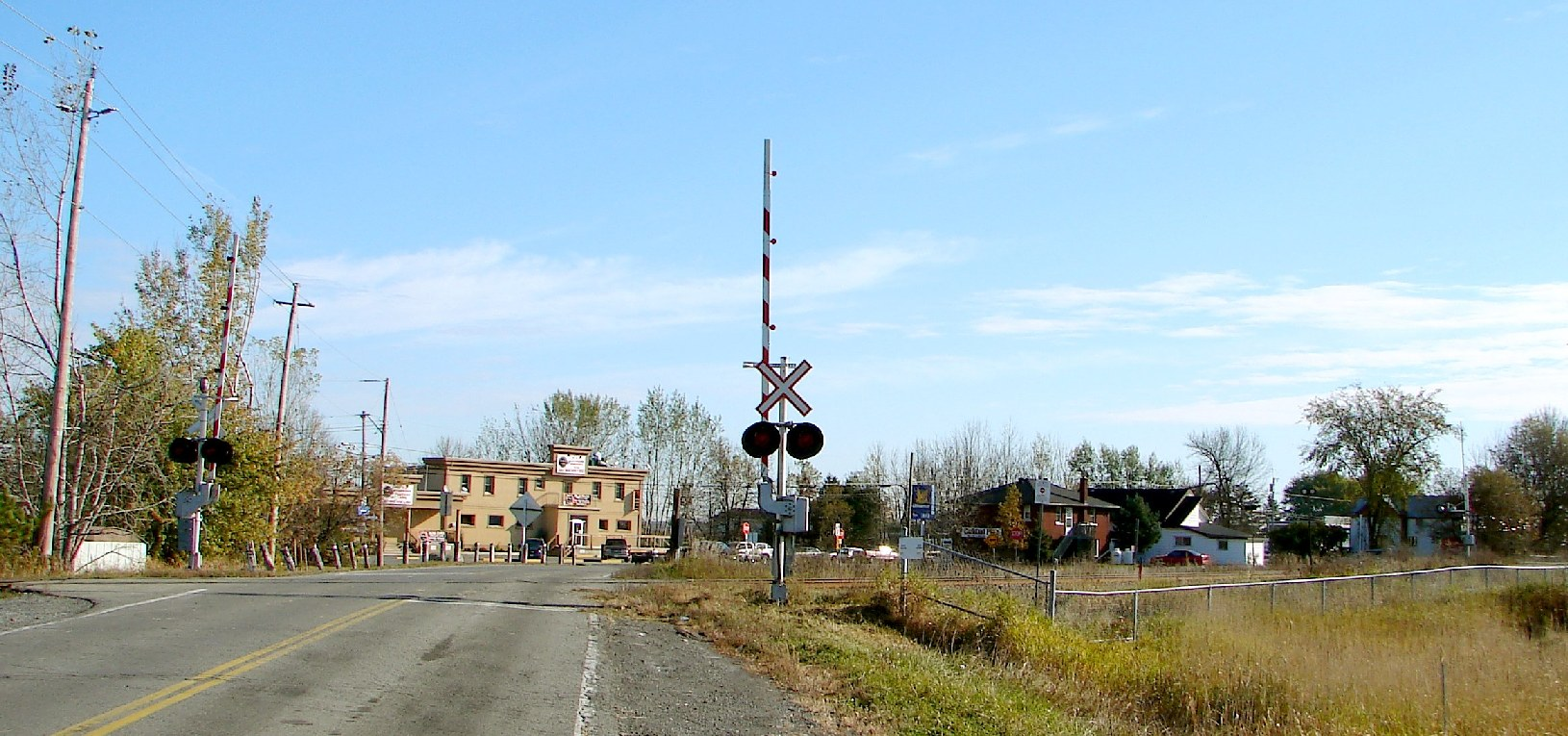

- Location within Southern Ontario
- Coordinates: 45°22′10″N 75°27′23″W
- Country: Canada
- Province: Ontario
- Municipality: Ottawa
- Ward: Osgoode Ward

Government
  - Fed. riding: Orléans
  - Prov. riding: Orléans
- Elevation: 69 m (228 ft)
- Time zone: UTC-5 (EST)
  - Summer (DST): UTC-4 (EDT)
- Postal code: K0A 1K0
- Area codes: 613, 343

Carlsbad Springs is a rural community on Bear Brook in Osgoode Ward in Ottawa, Ontario, Canada; Prior to amalgamation in 2001, the community was on the border between Gloucester and Cumberland. According to the Canada 2011 Census, the population of the surrounding area is 916 (area bounded on the north by Renaud Road and the CP Railway, 10th Line, on the east by Smith Road, Milton Road, Russell Road and Sand Road, on the south by Highway 417 and on the west by Anderson Road).

== History ==
=== Mineral spa-hotel era: 1870–1930 ===
The village, which was near Canada's capital city of Ottawa, was first known as Boyd's Mills, after the proprietor of the local mill on the Bear Brook, the first to process white pine lumber. It was later a grain mill when the land was cleared in the early 19th century and wheat farming began. It later became as Eastman's Springs, after Danny Eastman, who built the first inn to lodge travelers. In 1870, businessmen including future Ottawa Mayor C.W. Bangs formed the Dominion Springs Company to build a spa-hotel, which would offer as recreational and medical benefits the highly-mineralized water that was found in most local wells.

In 1882, a railway through the area brought travelers from farther distant. The track is now the main railway line between Ottawa and Montreal but was a single track at Carlsbad Springs, which lost its local railway station in the 1970s.

In the early 1900s, the hotel became a successful resort, attracting the upper classes of nearby Ottawa. As well as mineral waters and sulphur baths, they enjoyed guest lecturers, walking paths, horseback riding facilities, archery, billiards, and lawn games, and the mineral water was bottled and sold throughout North America. As a marketing device, the village was in 1906 renamed Carlsbad Springs after the most fashionable aristocratic resort in central Europe (now Karlovy Vary, Czech Republic,<<) where King Edward VII regularly took holidays. The resort spa did not survive the Depression of the 1930s. The all-wood hotel, the largest in the county for many years, became apartments in 1945 and was demolished in the 1980s.

=== 1930s–1970s ===
Family farms and the big hotel helped the community grow in the late 19th and early 20th centuries, but Carlsbad Springs' boom as a resort ended in the Great Depression of the 1930s, and by World War II, the resort and spa business dwindled. Most of the surrounding land was small dairy or chicken farms (up to 200 acres).

Unsuccessful official planning altered the local economy in the 1960s when the Ontario government proposed rebuilding Carlsbad Springs as a commuter city outside Ottawa's Green Belt (200 km^{2}.). Keen to co-operate, the National Capital Commission started acquiring farmland nearby, to provide the satellite city with its own Green Belt. Only then did it come to light that the local Leda clay soil cannot support tall buildings. Plans for the satellite city were abandoned, but the NCC retained thousands of acres of farmland, with no plans for whether or how it might be used. Some of the land was rented to farmers, but these diminished as the agricultural economy shrank in the 1980s.

=== 1980s–present ===
As Carlsbad Springs was conveniently accessible from the main highway that runs through Ottawa (highway 417), it was attractive to commuters with jobs in the city. By the 1980s, gradual development took place in Carlsbad Springs, with modest homes on large, treed lots. Nonetheless, a semi-rural feel was maintained, due to the absence of subdivisions, and to the continued existence of a range of agricultural activities, ranging from berry-picking farms, horse-related businesses (e.g., equestrian boarding facilities), and hobby farms.

Franco-Ontarian culture has a dominant influence on the area, which can be seen in the French-language signs and in the active presence of spoken French in homes and community activities. In the wintertime, snowmobiling is both a well-loved Carlsbad Springs activity and a practical way of traveling throughout the area, as attested by the snowmobile trails that run alongside the areas' major roads. The carnival is a popular event held every Winter at the end of January at Harkness Park and the Carlsbad Springs Community Centre (6020 Piperville Road).

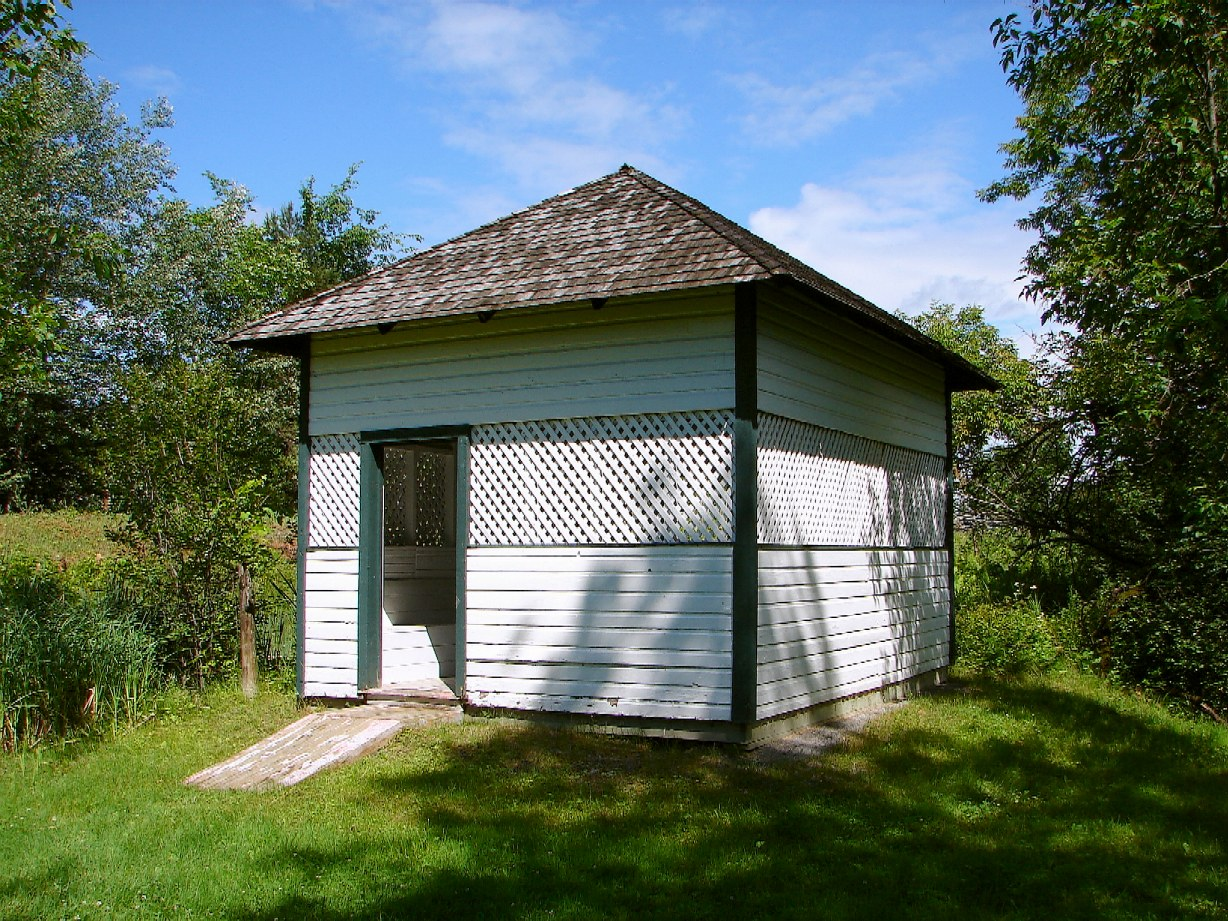
Last remaining springhouse in Carlsbad Springs

In the mid-1990s, one of the remaining spring houses was restored, so that the community would be able to remember Carlsbad Springs' past as a bustling resort and spa area. As well, Carlsbad Springs continued to attract other development, including a large golf course that was built close to highway 417. When Carlsbad Springs was amalgamated into the City of Ottawa, there was a mixed response from the community. While some residents were pleased that city services such as bus transportation would be available, other residents were concerned that the City of Ottawa's urban bylaws and regulations would stifle the area's semi-rural lifestyle.

A new community centre for Carlsbad Springs opened in 2011 at a cost of $3.2 million. The architect for the centre is the same one as the Shenkman Art Centre in Orléans. The Community Centre has a gymnasium, a multi-purpose room, a meeting room, a small office and a lobby area. Harkness Park, with its baseball field, a tennis court, a kids playground area, the new community centre and the surrounding facility will become the sports and leisure hub for the Carlsbad Springs community and rural east Ottawa.

The community is served by a low-power 15 watts tourist and community radio station, CJRO-FM, which operates at 107.7 MHz (FM) and is owned by the Carlsbad Springs Community Association. The name of the radio station is Carlsbad Info Radio and broadcast from the Carlsbad Springs Community Centre.

In 2018, the construction of a warehouse for Amazon began in Carlsbad Springs. It opened in 2019, creating over 600 full-time jobs between highway 417 and the centre of the village. Additionally, despite years of protesting from the community, development began on a dumping site for industrial waste in Carlsbad Springs. The community is set to receive six million dollars from the developer, Taggart Miller, over a thirty-year period in return for landfill and processing rights of hazardous waste material with an estimated annual capacity of 450,000 tonnes.

== Notable people ==
- C.W. Bangs (1814–1892), mayor of Ottawa in 1878
- Henry Newell Bate (1828-1917), industrialist
- Thomas Birkett (1844-1920), mayor of Ottawa in 1891; MP for Ottawa City from 1900 to 1904
- Raymond Desjardins, senior research scientist at Agriculture and Agri-Food Canada
- Stefanie McKeough (1991–), hockey player

It is rumoured that Prime Minister John A. Macdonald stayed at the Dominion House hotel in Carlsbad Springs.

== Statistics ==
Language

First Language	Number	Percentage
French	773	84.3%
English	129	14.1%
Other	14	1.5%

Crime

Statistic	Number Reported (2016)	Rate per 100 000
Assaults	24	2 620
Quality of Life Disorders	21	2 292
Minor Property Crimes	33	3 603
Theft of Vehicle	6	655
Break and Enter	12	1 310
Theft over $10 000 (non-vehicular)	6	655
Sexual Offences	8	873
Homicides	0	0
Suicides	1	109

Statistic	Number Reported (2015)	Rate per 100 000
Assaults	12	1 310
Quality of Life Disorders	20	2 183
Minor Property Crimes	26	2 838
Theft of Vehicle	6	655
Break and Enter	7	764
Theft over $10 000 (non-vehicular)	6	655
Sexual Offences	1	109
Homicides	1	109
Suicides	2	218

== See also ==
- List of Ottawa neighbourhoods
- Piperville
- Caledonia Springs, Ontario - similar mineral springs resort to the east
