= Lindenlea =

- Neighbourhood
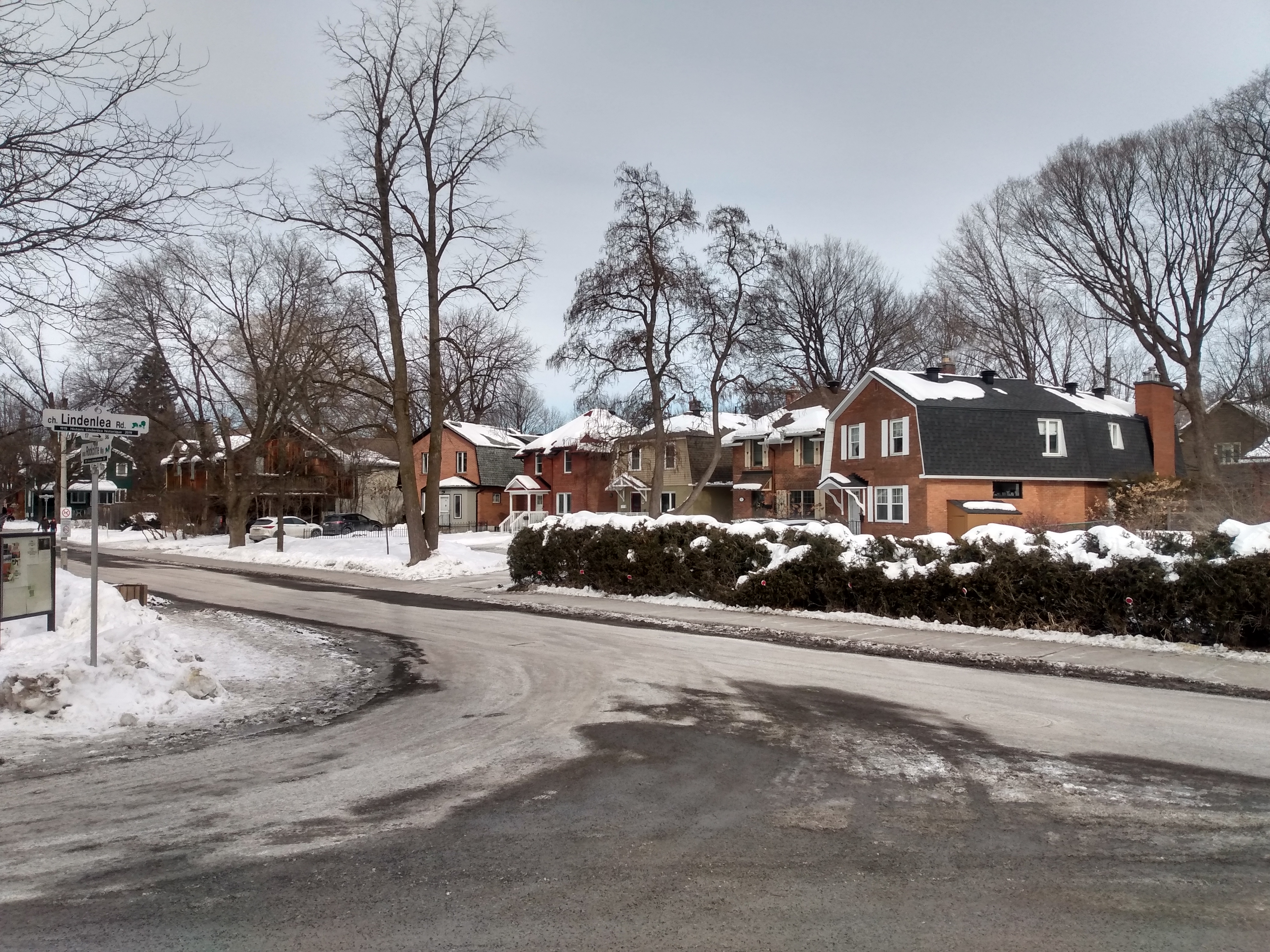
- Houses on Rockcliffe Way in "Upper Lindenlea"

- Location in Ottawa
- Coordinates: 45°26′35″N 75°40′28″W
- Country: Canada
- Province: Ontario
- City: Ottawa
- Established: 1919

Government
  - MP: Mona Fortier
  - MPPs: Lucille Collard
  - Councillors: Rawlson King
  - Governing body: Lindenlea Community Association
  - President: Tanya Allem

Area
  - Total: 0.254 km^{2} (0.098 sq mi)
- Elevation: 70 m (230 ft)

Population (2016)
  - Total: 1,702
  - Density: 6,700/km^{2} (17,400/sq mi)
- Canada 2016 Census
- Time zone: UTC−5 (Eastern (EST))
  - Summer (DST): UTC−4 (EDT)
- Forward sortation area: K1M
- Website: Community Association

Lindenlea is a neighbourhood in Rideau-Rockcliffe Ward in Ottawa, Ontario, Canada, northeast of Downtown. It is bordered by Maple Lane to the north, Acacia Avenue to the east, Beechwood Avenue to the south and Springfield Road to the west.

Prior to its founding in 1919, there were some homes in the area on Beechwood Avenue adjacent to the community of Clarkstown (now part of Vanier) and on Rideau Terrace. It is the earliest planned community in Ottawa, dating back to the end of the First World War. The community was planned by Thomas Adams and is an example of Adams' garden suburb style. Most of the homes have large back yards, a feature of this planning style. The community is divided into upper Lindenlea, north of Rideau Terrace, and lower Lindenlea. Only upper Lindenlea was planned by Adams. This part of the neighbourhood was developed by the Ottawa Housing Corporation, and was bought for $66,000. Lower Lindenlea was developed later but followed many of the garden suburb principles, including the large back yards, and contains a "melange of 1950s brick apartments". The Champlain Towers apartment complex was built by the Campeau Corporation in this section in 1962, and a further development in this section called "Springfield Mews", was built in the 1980s.

In 2019, to celebrate the 100th anniversary of the neighbourhood, the City of Ottawa installed commemorative street signs in the neighbourhood, replacing the regular blue and white municipal street signs.

Lindenlea is notable for its picturesque architecture, mature trees, and plentiful green space. The community association produces a periodic newsletter called The Lindenleader and residents of Lindenlea also receive The New Edinburgh News produced by the community association of neighbouring New Edinburgh. Lindenlea has a children's park, tennis courts, a bowling green and a community centre. The community centre was originally a communal garage—there were so few cars that the land was purchased by three local residents for use as a car park, but was later donated to the City.

The population as of the Canada 2016 Census was 1,702.

== See also ==
- List of Ottawa neighbourhoods
