= Crestview, Ottawa =

Neighbourhood in Ottawa, Ontario, Canada

Coordinates: 45°20′30″N 75°44′30″W

Crestview is a neighbourhood in College Ward in the west end of Ottawa, Ontario, Canada. It was originally part of the City of Nepean before amalgamation with Ottawa in 2001. Together with the neighbouring community of Meadowlands, the area is served by the Crestview-Meadowlands Community Association. The community association's boundaries are Meadowlands Drive on the north, Merivale Road on the east, the CN Railtracks on the south and Woodroffe Avenue on the west.

Most of the homes are bungalows which were popular in the 1950s and early 1960s. Later on, townhouses were built behind Merivale Mall and another section was built on Viewmount at the corner of Sullivan and Parkside Crescent.

The neighbourhood is believed to be named after the shape of Viewmount Drive going in a crest. Originally, Viewmount ended at Meirvale Road and was extended to Fisher Avenue in the early 1980s for the development of Fisher Glen.

== Features ==
The neighbourhood has four parks: Donland, Olmstead, Oakview, Bob Mitchell, and Crestview. Bob Mitchell Park has tennis courts.

The homeschools are Meadowlands Public School on Fieldrow Avenue and next door is St. Gregory's Catholic School. St. Gregory's moved to Meadowlands and Brook Lane in 2001 when Brook Lane Public School closed. The building became a Montessori and today is an Abraar elementary school. For middle schools, there is Sir Winston Churchill and Frank Ryan Catholic School in Parkwood Hills. High schools Merivale High School and St. Pius X for Catholics.

It is home to Merivale Mall, which was built in 1977.
