= Marionville, Ontario =

Rural community in Russell Township, Ontario, Canada

Coordinates: 45.1843°N 75.3500°W

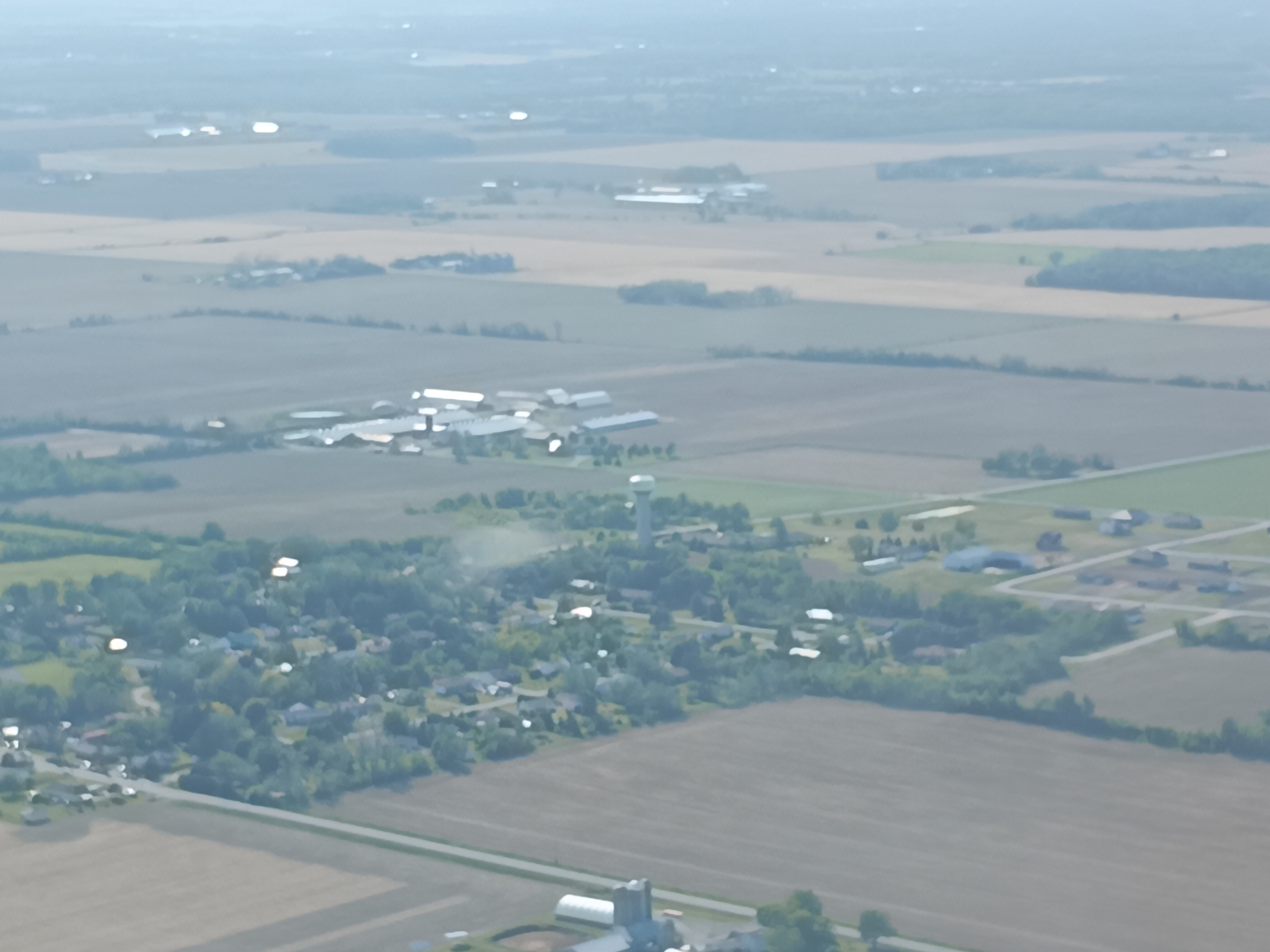
Marionville (Ontario) in 2023

Marionville is a dispersed rural community in Russell Township, Ontario, located on the border with the City of Ottawa and North Dundas. The community is located about 750m northwest of the East Castor River.

The population of the blocks surrounding the community was 238 according to the Canada 2011 Census.

Marionville is situated approximately 37 kilometres southeast of Downtown Ottawa (45 km by road).

The town is represented both federally and provincially among the three electoral districts of Carleton, Glengarry—Prescott—Russell, and Stormont—Dundas—South Glengarry. This gives Marionville one of the highest governmental representation levels per capita in the world.
