= Grenfell Glen =

Neighbourhood of Ottawa, Canada

Coordinates: 45.31646°N 75.72778°W

- Neighbourhood
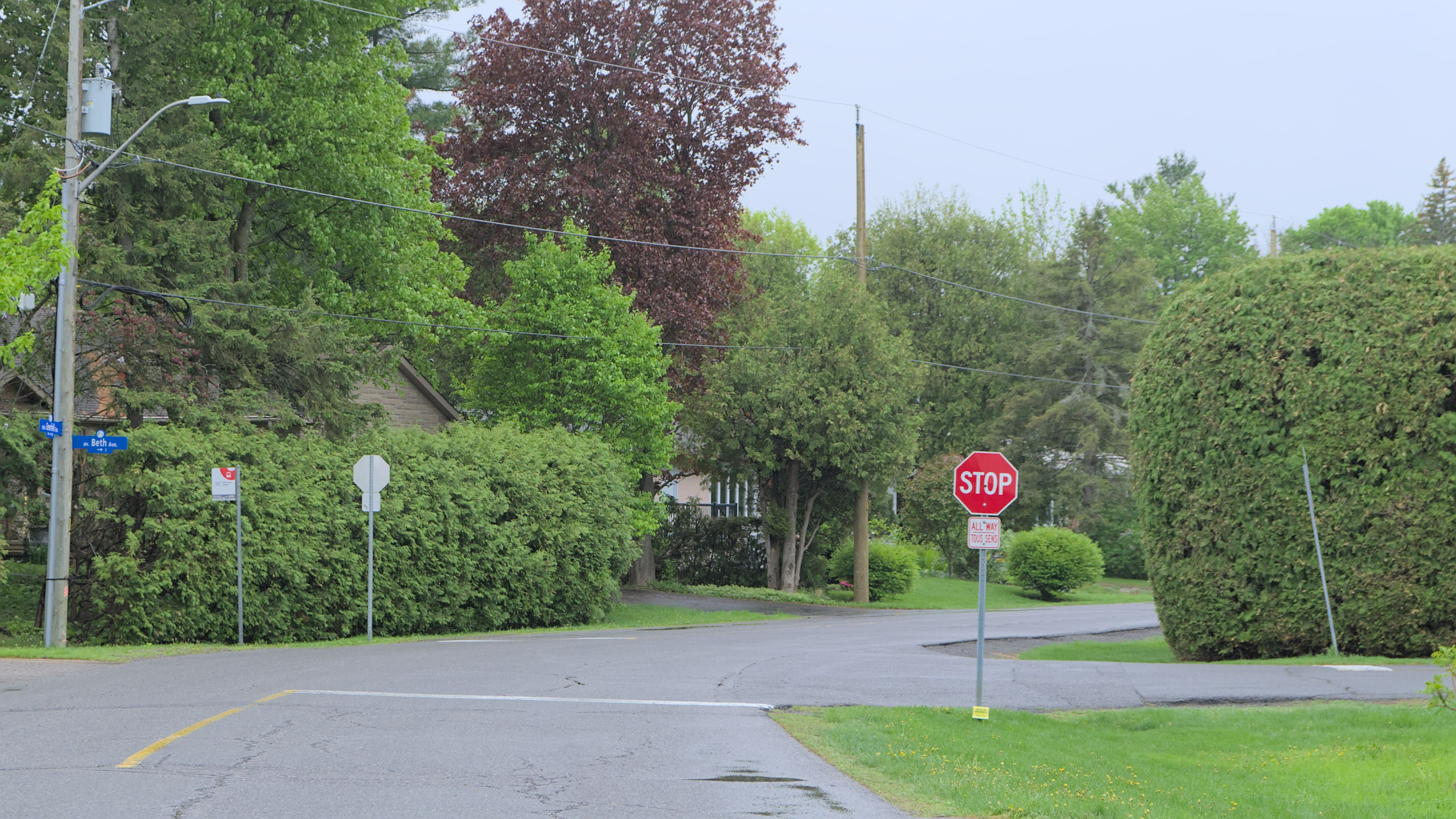
- Grenfell Crescent at Beth Avenue
- Interactive map of Grenfell Glen
- Country: Canada
- Province: Ontario
- City: Ottawa

Government
  - MP: Mark Carney
  - MPP: Tyler Watt
  - City Councillor: Sean Devine
- Time zone: UTC−5 (Eastern (EST))
  - Summer (DST): UTC−4 (EDT)

Grenfell Glen (also called the Grenfell Sector) is a small neighbourhood in Knoxdale-Merivale Ward in the city of Ottawa in Ontario, Canada.

== Location ==
It is located in the former city of Nepean. Grenfell Glen is a small community of about 150 houses surrounded by woods that are part of the National Capital Commission's Greenbelt. The population of the neighbourhood is about 450.

Pinhey Forest, named after Charles H. Pinhey, is located immediately to Grenfell Glen's north. It is bordered on the north by West Hunt Club Road. The small portion of forest to the West of Grenfell Glen was intended to be the remainder of the neighbourhood and still has streets that are named on some maps. The developer of the neighbourhood sold that remainder of land to the NCC. As a result, the community is in the middle of the Ottawa green belt.

== History ==
The neighbourhood was developed by subdivider W. Elmer Brown in 1956 following his 1951 Pineglen development. Brown bought the land, subdivided it and sold it to residents or developers to build on. The neighbourhood was developed using a 'metes and bounds' description as it was considered by both subdivider/developer and Nepean council at the time to be out of the urban control area. This was a preferred method of development for most builders at the time as it bypassed planning approval by the council and delays in approval by the Ottawa Planning Area Board, and the Road Agreement (which was a condition of subdivision approval that meant subdividers had to lay gravel roads at their own expense). This bypassing of planning approval would lead to difficulties in road construction and completion, wherein Grenfell Glen it would take until 1958 for Nepean's road superintendent to finally complete the roads at Brown's expense.

Grenfell Glen is also neighbour to Pineglen, which is on the other side of the railway tracks on its border to the south.

The neighbourhood is covered by the Glens Community Association.

The neighbourhood was developed in 1956 and most original homeowners are now retired. The official residence of the Ambassador of Cameroon is located on Burnbank Street. Philemon Yunji Yang lived there for 20 years when the normal post of an Ambassador is five years. Russ Jackson, the famous Canadian football player, used to live on Avonlea Road near the corner of Burnbank Street.
