= Dalmeny, Ontario =

Rural community in Ottawa, Ontario, Canada

Coordinates: 45.147°N 75.531°W

Dalmeny is a dispersed rural community located near the source of the South Castor River in the Osgoode Ward of Ottawa, Ontario, Canada. The population of the surrounding area is about 225.

Prior to amalgamation in 2001, Dalmeny was in Osgoode Township.

== See also ==
- List of communities in Ontario
