= Carson Grove =

- Neighbourhood
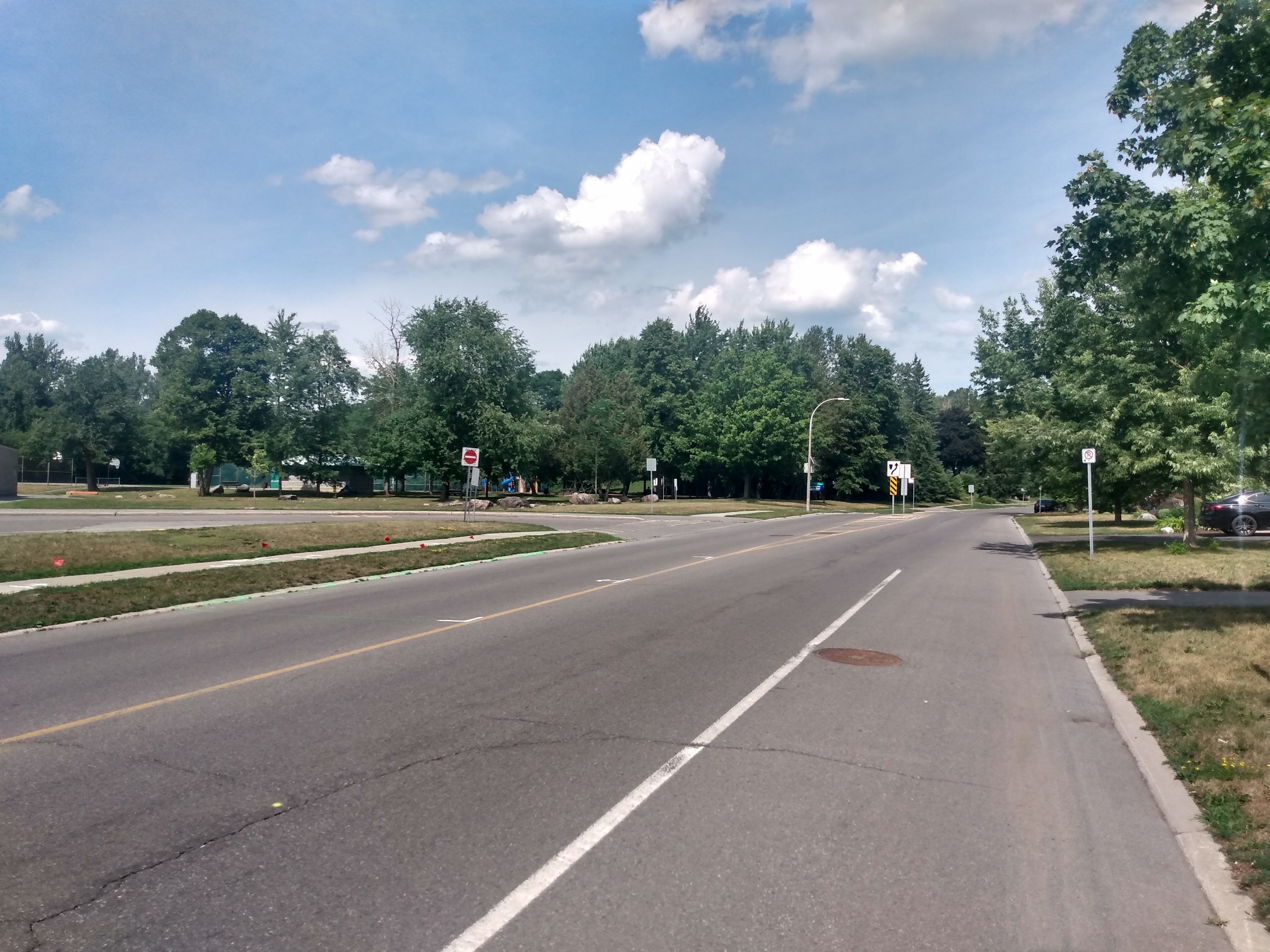
- Carson Grove Park

- Location within Ottawa
- Coordinates: 45.4358°N 75.6247°W
- Country: Canada
- Province: Ontario
- City: Ottawa

Government
  - MPs: Mona Fortier
  - MPPs: Lucille Collard
  - Councillors: Tim Tierney, Rawlson King

Area
  - Total: 1.595 km^{2} (0.616 sq mi)
- Elevation: 75 m (246 ft)

Population (Canada 2016 Census)
  - Total: 2,918
  - Density: 1,829/km^{2} (4,738/sq mi)
- Time zone: Eastern (EST)
- Forward sortation areas: K1J, K1K

Carson Grove is a neighbourhood in the east end of Ottawa, Ontario, Canada. The neighbourhood spans the former Ottawa-Gloucester boundary, which still forms the boundary between Rideau-Rockcliffe Ward and Beacon Hill-Cyrville Ward.

The neighbourhood was built in the early 1970s by the Campeau Corporation, and was named for John Carson, an early settler in the region. The neighbourhood was expanded in the mid-1990s with the building of Carson Village, which was developed by the Canada Mortgage and Housing Corporation.

The neighbourhood is roughly bounded on the west by the Aviation Parkway, on the North by Collège La Cité, on the South by Ogilvie Road and on the east by Blair Road. Some sources give Montreal Road as the northern boundary and Bathgate Road as the eastern border.

According to the Canada 2016 Census, the neighbourhood had a population of 2,918.
