= Rideau Heights, Kingston =

Neighbourhood in Kingston, Ontario

Rideau Heights
- Interactive map of Rideau Heights
- Coordinates: 44.259°N 76.488°W
- Country: Canada
- Province: Ontario
- City: Kingston
- Neighbourhood: Rideau Heights

Area
  - Total: 32 ha (79 acres)

Rideau Heights is a 32-hectare area in northern Kingston, Ontario consisting primarily of row-housing and low-rise apartment buildings. The area is physically isolated and economically disadvantaged. Kingston's Housing Authority has identified Rideau Heights as a pilot project for improving the area with the intent of applying the lessons learned to other social housing sites throughout the city.

A regeneration strategy is being developed for Rideau Heights. The project incorporates a public and stakeholder engagement strategy to ensure that residents have opportunities to contribute.
