= Manordale =

Neighbourhood in Ottawa, Ontario, Canada

Coordinates: 45°19′40″N 75°45′40″W

Manordale is a neighbourhood in Knoxdale-Merivale Ward in the west end of Ottawa, Ontario, Canada. It is located in the former City of Nepean. It is bounded on the north and west by Knoxdale Road, east by Woodroffe Avenue, and south by Hunt Club Road.

According to the Canada 2011 Census this area has a population of 1,947.

Established in the late 1950s and early 1960s. The homes are mainly bungalows which also features rental townhouses on Woodroffe. Manordale was considered the first neighbourhood developed in the Knoxdale ward. Later in the decade Woodvale, north of Knoxdale was developed.

== Features ==
Home to four parks: Manordale Park (originally called Orr Unsworth Park), Sherry Lane Park, Roundhay Park and Ben Franklin Park. Manordale Park features the Manordale Community Building.

It is also home to a Fire Station. Two schools in the neighbourhood are Manordale Public School and Saint John XXIII Catholic School in Woodvale.

Close to Ben Franklin soccer dome and the Nepean Sportsplex. One bike path goes through Sherry Lane and Manordale parks, and another bike path goes along Hunt Club Road.
