= Torbolton Township =

Geographic township in Carleton County, Ontario, Canada

Coordinates: 45°28′N 76°04.5′W

Map of City of Ottawa showing Torbolton Twp.

Torbolton is a geographic township and former municipality that was originally part of Carleton County in eastern Ontario, Canada.

Torbolton is located in the north-western part of the county, bordered to the southwest by Fitzroy Township, to the southeast by March Township and to the north by the Ottawa River. It includes the communities of Baskin's Beach, Buckham's Bay, Constance Bay, Dirleton, Kilmaurs, MacLarens, and Woodlawn.

The township was established in 1821. Although white pine was harvested from the forests of this area from the beginning of the 19th century, the first permanent settler is believed to have been David MacLaren in the 1820s. In 1974, the township was amalgamated with Huntley and Fitzroy to form West Carleton. In 2001, West Carleton became part of the new city of Ottawa.

Torbolton took its name from the village of Tarbolton in Ayrshire, Scotland. Lord Torbolton was one of the titles of Charles Lennox, 4th Duke of Richmond, who was Governor General of British North America from 1818 to 1819.

According to the 2016 Canadian census, the Township had a population of 6,974. As of the 2021 Canadian census, this had increased to 7,000.

== Reeves ==
- 1850 David MacLaren
- 1852 James Grierson
- 1856 John Buckham
- 1865 J. Hedley
- 1866 John Smith
- 1878 James Mills
- 1880 James Grierson
- 1887 James Mills
- 1890 James Grierson
- 1891 W. Newham
- 1892 C. Buckham
- 1897 n/a
- 1907 W.J. Armitage
- 1917 Isaac Davis
- 1918 W.J. Armitage
- 1919 Isaac Davis
- 1921 John T. Armitage
- 1938 Thomas A. Dolan
- 1963 R.C. Thomas
- 1968 Thomas A. Dolan

== See also ==
- List of townships in Ontario
