= Uplands, Ottawa =

Neighbourhood in Ottawa, Ontario, Canada

Coordinates: 45°20′10″N 75°40′10″W

Uplands, also known as Elizabeth Park or Airport-Uplands is a neighbourhood in Gloucester-Southgate Ward in the south end of Ottawa, Ontario, Canada. It is located in the federal and provincial districts of Ottawa South, in the former city of Gloucester. It is bordered by the Hunt Club Road to the north, Uplands Drive to the east, and the Macdonald-Cartier International Airport to the south and west. The neighbourhood is adjacent to the military community living at CFB Uplands, which was a large air force base in the 1960s and which still contains residential housing for military members.

The neighbourhood was first built around 1940. The neighbourhood was expanded eastward in the early 1960s. A newer neighbourhood named Wisteria Park was built around 2006 north of Uplands off of Hunt Club. Wisteria Park maintains its own community association. The total population of Uplands, including Wisteria Park was 1,581 (Canada 2016 Census).
