= Ficko =

Coordinates: 45.2808°N 75.6287°W

Ficko is a dispersed rural community in Osgoode Ward in Ottawa, Ontario, Canada. It is located in the former City of Gloucester, which was amalgamated into Ottawa in 2001. The community is located on Bowesville Road halfway between Earl Armstrong Road and Rideau Road, and includes Ficko Crescent.

The Osgoode Link Pathway (which is the decommissioned railbed of the Canadian Pacific Railway) passes to its East.

It is named for Herman Frederick Ficko, who purchased 12.5 acres of land on 20 October 1958 for the development of the subdivision.
