= Carp, Ontario =

Carp
- Rural community
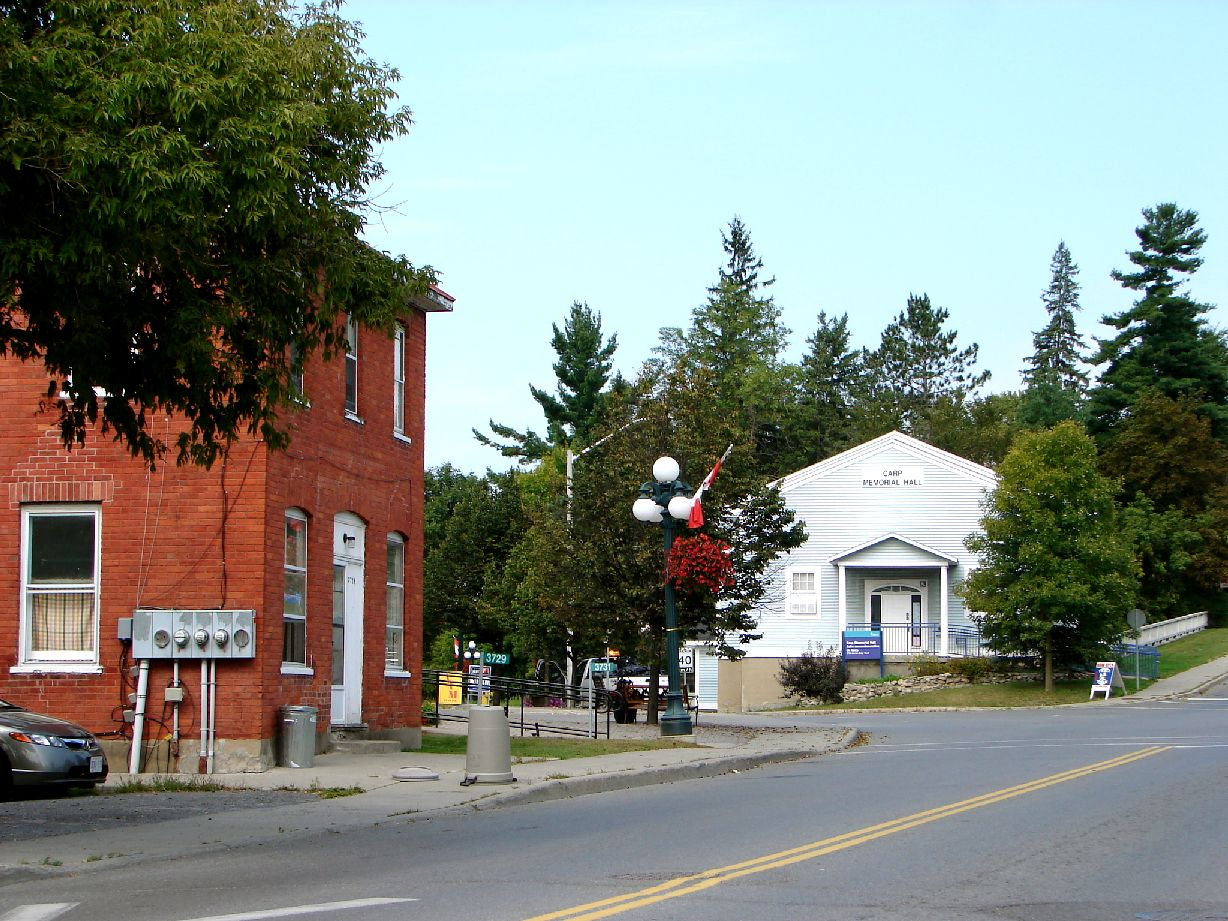

- Location within Ottawa
- Coordinates: 45°21′00″N 76°02′00″W
- Country: Canada
- Province: Ontario
- City: Ottawa

Government
  - City Councilor: Clarke Kelly
  - MP: Jenna Sudds
  - MPP: Karen McCrimmon
- Elevation: 100 m (330 ft)

Population (2021)
  - Total: 1,477
- Canada 2011 Census
- Time zone: UTC−05:00 (Eastern (EST))
  - Summer (DST): UTC−04:00 (EDT)
- Postal code: K0A 1L0

Carp is a compact rural community in West Carleton-March Ward in the City of Ottawa, Ontario, Canada, located in the northwestern portion of the municipality on the Carp River. It is about 33 km (21 mi) from downtown Ottawa. Prior to amalgamation in 2001, Carp was located in the West Carleton Township.

Carp is located in the Kanata federal electoral riding and the Kanata—Carleton provincial electoral riding.

According to the Canada 2011 Census, 1,965 people lived in the area around Carp (Craig Sideroad/Murphy Sideroad on the north, former Township limits on the east, March Road on the south and Thomas Argue Road on the west)

== History ==
By 1866, Carp was a post village with a population of 200 of the Township of Huntley on the Carp river, 32 km (20 mi) from Ottawa. The village contained three stores, workshops, three hotels, and a town hall. The Loyal Orange Lodge, No. 439, met at the Orange Hall Carp on the first Wednesday in each month. Citizens included J. W. Featherston, general merchant and postmaster.

The village takes its name from the Carp River which runs through the village. The main street was formerly a section of the Trans-Canada Highway and carried much of the traffic coming from the west into Ottawa. However the village has been bypassed with the development of the Highway 417.

With the amalgamation of municipal governments in the region in 2001, Carp is now governed as part of the new city of Ottawa. Carp is used as a mailing address for most of the former Huntley Township. As such, residents of this large area will identify themselves as living in Carp although they may live large distances from the village proper.

== Features and attractions ==
The town is situated on the southern end of the Carp Hills, a small range of pristine hills that have been compared to Gatineau Park. Several walking trails start in or near the town.

The Carleton Masonic Lodge #465, a turn of the century (1900s) church building has been the Masonic Lodge in the Village of Carp since 1925. The building features original stained glass windows and is decorated with beautiful oak furniture that was originally located in a World War I Military Masonic Lodge in France. The original Masonic lodge building, which dates to 1904 was destroyed by fire in 1920.

Carp was the site of an alleged 1989 UFO landing. It has been called "One of the most significant cases in UFO history." Someone dubbed 'Guardian' filmed the entire UFO crash. The American TV show Unsolved Mysteries filmed an episode on Guardian in 1993.

There are three schools in the Carp area: Huntley Centennial Public School, St. Michael's (Corkery), and Venta, a private school which abruptly closed in late 2017 after the death of its founder.

The Carp Airport is just south of the village. Carp also has a junior ice hockey team called the West Carleton Inferno.

=== Diefenbunker ===
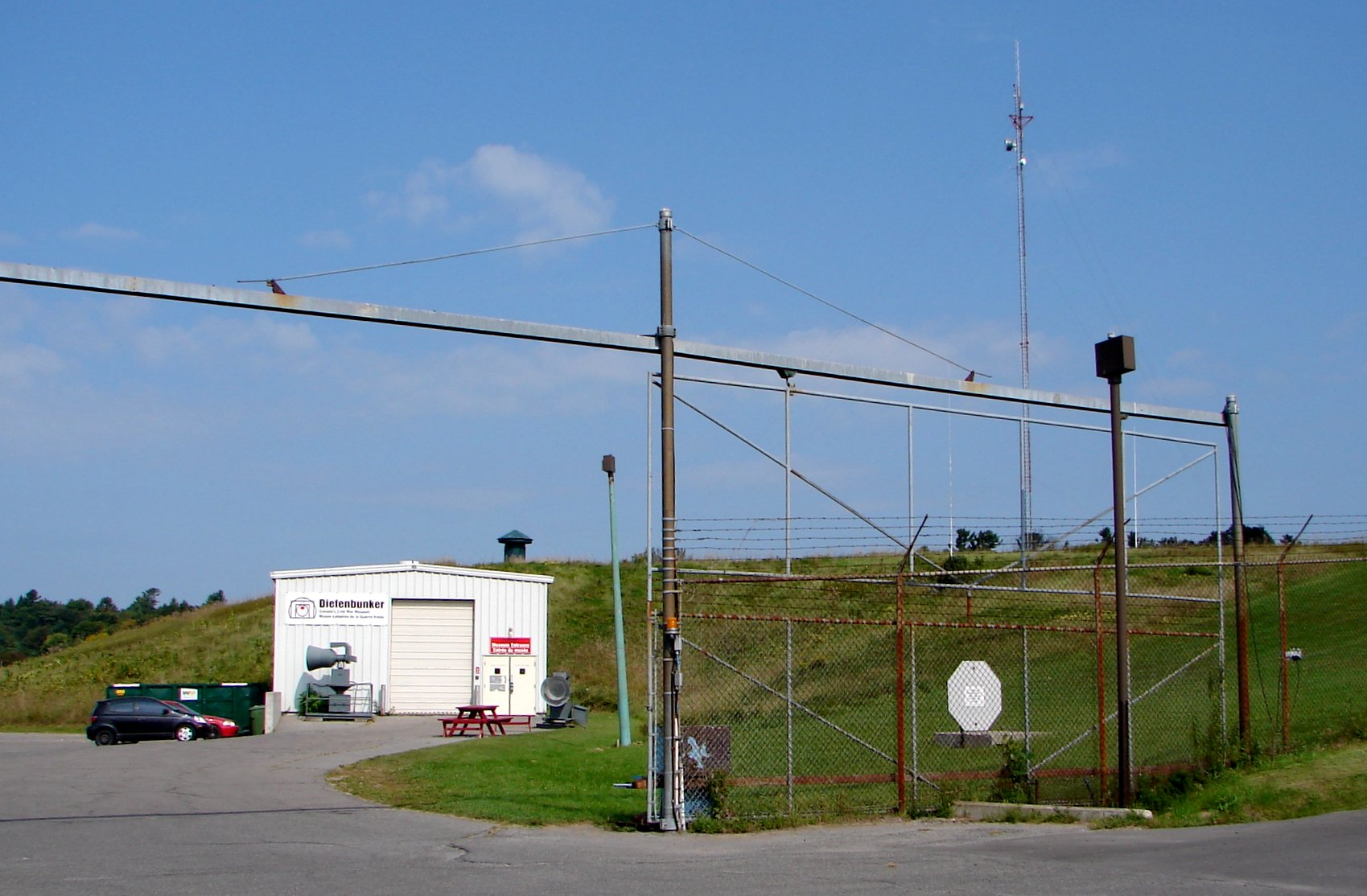
CFS Carp, the Diefenbunker, shown with two CLM sirens

Carp's main attraction is the Diefenbunker, Canada's Cold War museum just north of the village, and was featured in the film The Sum of All Fears. This former top-secret underground bunker was built to house key members of the government in the event of a nuclear attack on Ottawa.

In 1960, NATO and the Canadian Department of National Defence built a satellite communications (SATCOM) station which supports a 68 ft (21 m) diameter metal space frame radar dome (radome) on its roof, which provides environmental protection for the 50 ft (15 m) diameter SATCOM antenna it houses. Until 1999 when NATO and DND decommissioned the site, the antenna provided satellite communications between all NATO countries. Two CLM Rotating sirens can also be seen in the photo on the left. In 1999, it was purchased by Canadian Space Services Ltd. to serve as its corporate headquarters.

=== Carp Fair ===
With the closure of Ottawa SuperEX in 2011, the Carp Fair is one of the only fall fairs close to Ottawa and established in 1863.

The Carp Exhibit Hall, one of the few remaining octagonal frame fairground buildings in Ontario, continues to function as the main fairground hall for the Carp Fair held in September each year since 1880. During the remainder of the year, the buildings and grounds serve the popular Carp Farmers' Market held each Saturday from May to October. The red-painted Exhibit Hall with white trim, which remains a focal point in Carp was included amongst other architecturally interesting and historically significant buildings in Doors Open Ottawa, held June 2 and 3, 2012.

== The Carp River ==
The origin of the name of the Carp River is unknown.

In "Carleton Saga" by Harry and Olive Walker, the over-abundant fish found in the river were said, by early French explorers, to be suckers and mud-pout, that in French translate as carpe.

== Sources ==
- Carp Guardian Case retrieved 2007-11-02
- Riding Information retrieved 2012-14-02
