= Viscount Alexander Park =

Coordinates: 45.4509°N 75.6385°W

Viscount Alexander Park is a neighbourhood in Rideau-Rockcliffe Ward in the east end of Ottawa, Ontario, Canada. At its maximum extent, the neighbourhood has a population of 5,430 according to the Canada 2011 Census.

The neighbourhood includes much of the Rockcliffe Airport and the CFB Ottawa (North). It also includes the Montfort Hospital.

Its bounded on the north by the Ottawa River, on the east by Blair Road, on the south by Montreal Road and on the west by the Aviation Parkway.

Part of the neighbourhood, east of Codd's Road is also known as Finter. It named for Harold, Viscount Alexander of Tunis, Governor General of Canada from 1946 until 1952.

Since the 2020s, much of Viscount Alexander Park has been superseded by the newer neighbourhood of Wateridge Village.
