= Vars, Ontario =

Vars
- Community
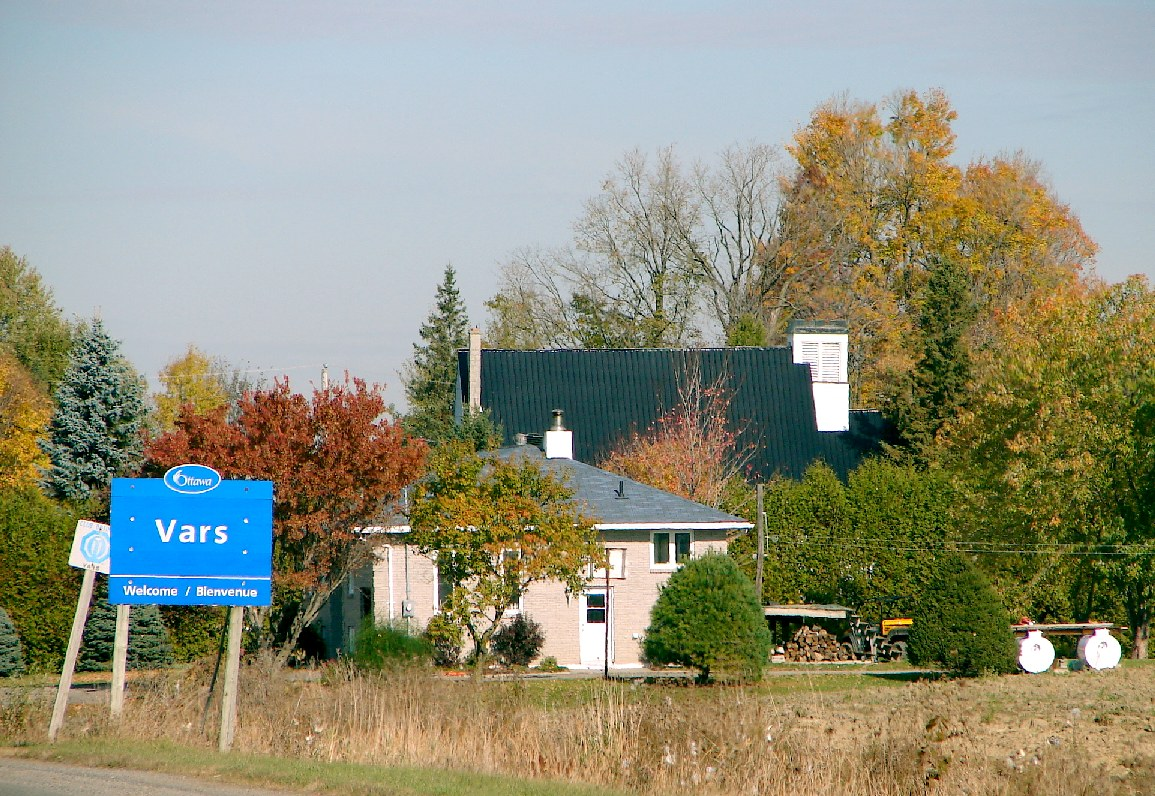
- Sign seen coming in to Vars, with some properties in the background.
- Interactive map of Vars
- Coordinates: 45.355946°N 75.353052°W
- Country: Canada
- Province: Ontario
- City: Ottawa
- Founded: 1836

Population (2021)
  - Total: 1,579
- Website: vars.ca

Location of Vars (bright red) in Ottawa

Vars is a compact rural community in Osgoode Ward in the east end of Ottawa, Ontario, Canada. According to the Canada 2021 Census, the population of Vars was 1,579, using the boundaries defined in the Vars neighbourhood planning study area.

== Facilities ==
Vars has St-Guillaume, a French elementary school, two churches (one Anglican (closed, last service November 18 2024,) one Roman Catholic,) and Alcide Trudeau Park. There are a few businesses, including a pizzeria and a pharmacy. The village’s fire station, Ottawa Fire Service's Station 73, was relocated in 2007 to the south end of Frank Kenny Road. The local youth softball teams the Vars Vipers and Vikings, are both sponsored by local businesses.

== History ==
The Bearbrook area, where Vars is located, was first inhabited in 1824 and by 1836 a small settlement had formed. Bear Brook took its name from the hardy bear population that foraged for acorns from the plentiful oaks flanking its banks.

Mr. Dunning set up his sawmill operation using logs channelled through Bear Brook, continuing eastward to the South Nation River, then to the Ottawa River and finally out to the St. Lawrence Seaway. Nowadays Bear Brook flows with less than half its water capacity compared to when the settlers first arrived. When the mill was built the town consisted of a hotel, some stores and approximately 200 people, the majority being English-speaking and of Irish descent.

In 1881, the area was renamed Bearbrook Station to reflect the new train station built to transport logs to the St. Lawrence. By 1886, population growth warranted its own post office, lightening the load for postmaster Jack Young, used to delivering mail by horse or snowshoe, depending on the season.

As Bearbrook Station became difficult to distinguish from Bearbrook, it was renamed to Vars. Two sources lay claim to this name. The first maintains that a retired Embrun priest, l’Abbé C. Guillaume, chose to commemorate the village of Vars in France’s Hautes-Alpes region.

The more circulated claim is that the four men responsible for bringing the post office to Bearbrook Station deserved the credit. Their names were McVeigh, Armstrong, Ronan and Smith. As the first letter of each surname spelt MARS, they were relieved they had an alternate letter at their disposal in the McVeigh surname.

In 1915, permanent sidewalks were built in the main community area. In 1931, the first street lights were erected, a full year sooner than in their neighbouring community of Cumberland.

== Demographics ==
| Year | Population |
|---|---|
| 2011 | 1,424 |
| 2016 | 1,514 |
| 2021 | 1,579 |
