= May 2022 Canadian derecho =

Severe meteorological event

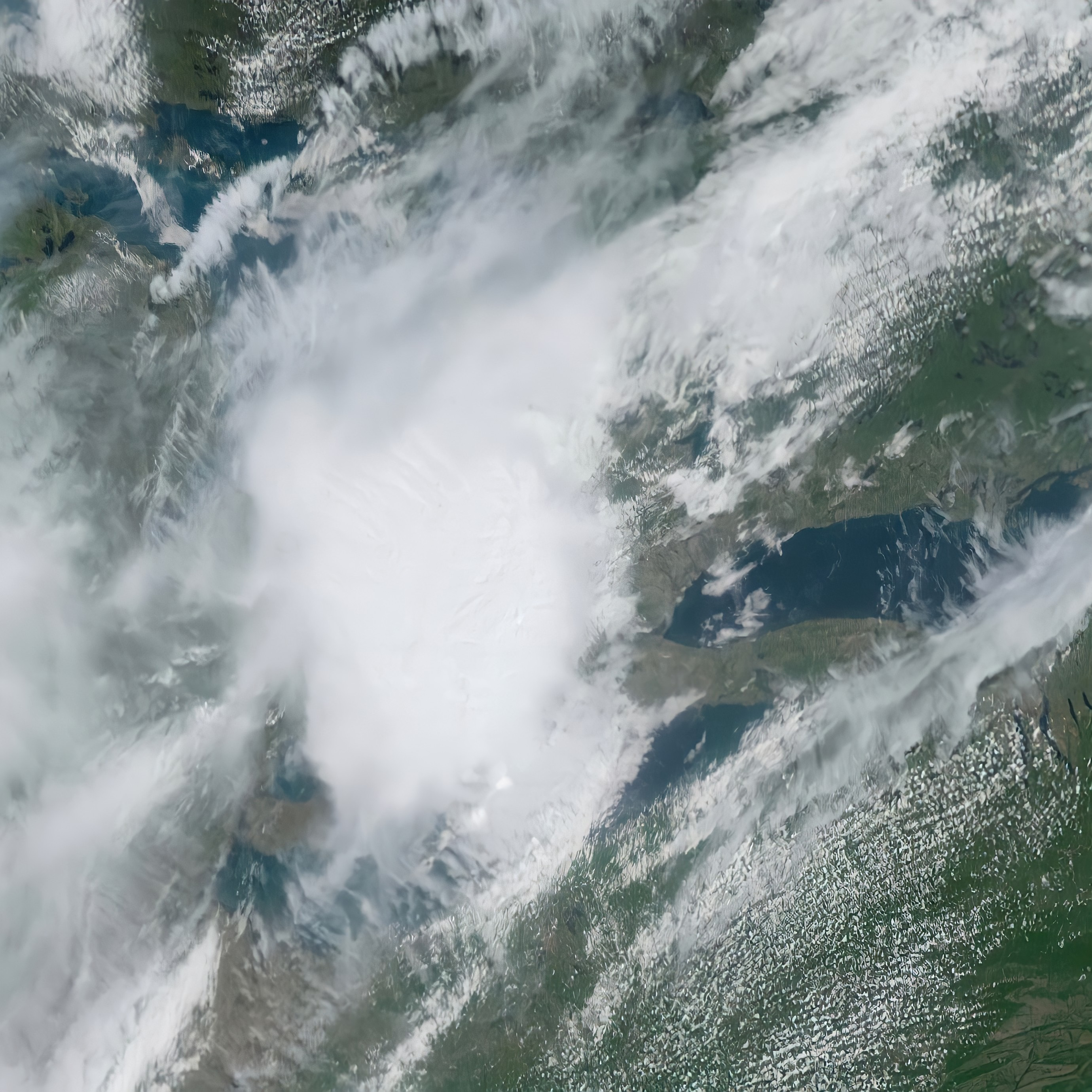
- Date(s): May 21, 2022
- Duration: 9 hours
- Track length: 620 mi (998 km)
- Peak wind gust (measured): 103.2 mph (166 km/h; 46.1 m/s) (London, Ontario, Canada)
- Peak wind gust (est.): 130 mph (209 km/h; 58.1 m/s) (London, Canada)
- Tornado count: 4
- Strongest tornado^{1}: CEF2 tornado
- Fatalities: 35
- Damage costs: C$ 1 billion ($806 million USD)
- Types of damage: Widespread damage to residential and commercial property and public utility infrastructure
- Areas affected: Southern Ontario, southern Quebec
- ^{1}Most severe tornado damage; see Enhanced Fujita scale

The May 2022 Canadian derecho was a high-impact derecho event that affected the Quebec City-Windsor Corridor, Canada's most densely populated region, on May 21, 2022. Described by meteorologists as a historic derecho and one of the most impactful thunderstorms in Canadian history, winds up to 209 km/h (130 mph) as well as around four tornadoes caused widespread and extensive damage along a path that extended for 1,000 kilometres (620 mi).

Three cities across Southern Ontario declared a state of emergency. At least twelve people were killed, mostly by falling trees. Power outages affected an estimated 1.1 million customers, and thousands were still without power a week after the storm. Hydro Ottawa described the damage dealt to its power distribution system as more severe than the 1998 ice storm. The storm was the sixth-costliest event in Canadian history.

According to an estimate published on June 15 by the firm Catastrophe Indices and Quantification (CatIQ), the insured damage would amount to C$875 million, that is, C$720 million in Ontario and C$155 million in Quebec. This ranks the derecho as the sixth-costliest natural disaster in Canada in terms of insurance claims.

== Background ==
Derecho frequency

Derechos affecting this region typically develop in the U.S. Midwest and affect only a small part of the Quebec City-Windsor Corridor. This was the first deadly event of this magnitude in Canada since 1999. In Southern Ontario, frequency of a derecho on average once every year in the extreme southwest (Windsor, parts of Essex County), to about once in every four years further north into central areas of Southern Ontario (Barrie, Peterborough, Kingston) and in Northwestern Ontario along a narrow strip of the Minnesota international border. The historic range has likely shifted northward, due to climate change.

Typically, derechos anywhere in this area can form from late spring through the summer months. These derechos usually occur when a hot and muggy air mass covers the Midwest and Ohio Valley, the stronger derechos in this region tend to develop on the northern boundary between the hot, humid air and cooler, drier air where there is also an elevated mixed layer (EML).

Most derechos in Canada are progressive derechos which skirt the northern edge of a heat wave high pressure area, or hybrid derechos which are similar to progressive derechos, but arise ahead of a cold front. Tornadoes which accompany these types of derechos are usually Quasi-Linear Convective System (QLCS) tornadoes which are embedded in the bow echo.

== Meteorological history ==
A persistent May heat wave in the U.S. expanded sporadically to include southern Ontario and Quebec throughout May, resulting in unseasonably warm temperatures more typical of July. After a brief respite, the heat returned on May 19, 20, and 21. At 11 am, Toronto Pearson Airport hit 29.3 °C (84.7 °F), three degrees shy of the record for that date, with a humidex of 36 °C (97 °F). Ottawa-Gatineau hit 31.5 °C (88.7 °F) at 2 pm, one degree shy of the record for that date, with a humidex of 38 °C (100 °F). A sharp cold front was expected to bring thunderstorms through the region on Saturday, prior to a precipitous drop in temperature potentially resulting in subsequent frost.

The system first formed south of Chicago. On Saturday morning at 10:37 am EST, thunderstorms with significant wind developed in Macomb and St. Clair counties in Michigan. The wind of these storms snapped some trees, mostly in St. Clair County, but this cluster of thunderstorms had not yet formed a bow echo.

The derecho developed near Sarnia at 9:30 am. By 10:45 am when the storms hit London, the derecho had coalesced into a bow front roughly 100 km (62 mi) wide and had developed wind speeds of close to 209 km/h (130 mph). The bow front continued to widen and intensify east of London, roughly following a corridor between Highway 401 and Highway 7 in Ontario, and then along the Autoroute 20 in Quebec.

The storm moved east at an average 100 km/h, striking Toronto at 1:00 pm, Ottawa at 3:50 pm, Montreal at 5:30 pm, and Quebec City at 6:30 pm. The weather changed very rapidly as the derecho approached. At Pearson International Airport, in the period between 12:52 pm and 1 pm, gust wind speeds went from 72 km/h to 120 km/h.

The bow echo retained its structure for nine hours, and covered a total track length of 1,000 km (620 mi). It weakened over south-central Quebec, and dissipated in the Atlantic Canada region by early Sunday morning.

=== Straight line wind speeds ===
The highest reported wind gust of 166 km/h (103 mph) was recorded at the Region of The London Regional Airport. Nearly 1,000 km (620 mi) away at Lake Memphremagog, Quebec, a wind gust hit 144 km/h (89 mph). Most of the weather stations along the derecho's path recorded wind gusts near or above 100 km/h (62 mph), including the Greater Toronto Area, Ottawa, Trois-Rivières, and Quebec City.

A storm survey from the Northern Tornadoes Project reported a severe downburst in parts of Southern Ontario. Its windspeeds reached up to 209 km/h (130 mph).

A gust of 121 km/h (75 mph) at Pearson International Airport set a May record, and is the fifth strongest wind gust ever recorded at that location.

=== Tornadoes ===
An (C)EF2 (Note: Canada uses a different version of the Enhanced Fujita scale, which is still commonly called the "EF-scale". The Canadian version of the scale is officially known as the "Canadian Enhanced Fujita scale" or "CEF-scale".) tornado which was embedded in the leading edge of the derecho struck Uxbridge, Ontario at 1:15 pm. An (C)EF1 QLCS tornado was confirmed in London, Ontario. Another (C)EF2 QLCS tornado was confirmed in London, Ontario. Another (C)EF2 tornado was detected in the Lake Scugog area .

== Prediction ==
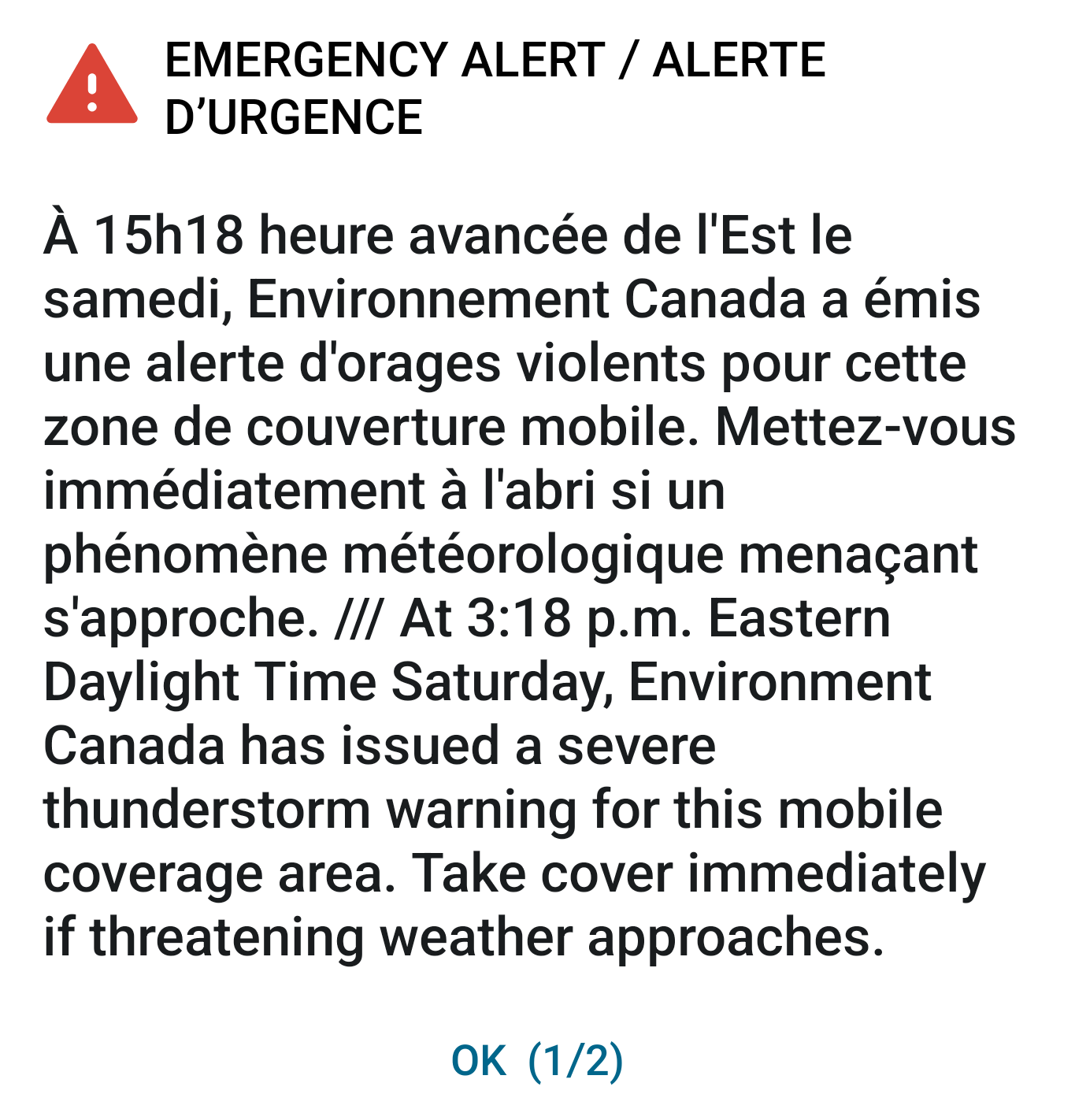
Alert Ready message on Android devices, issued for Gatineau, Québec

For the first day of the Victoria Day long weekend, atmospheric instability was forecast throughout Michigan's south peninsula, the Ohio Valley, southern Ontario and southern Quebec. Most of southern Ontario south of the 401 was assigned a marginal risk of severe weather. Tornadoes were predicted to be possible in eastern Ontario into southern Quebec in the afternoon.

Environment Canada issued weather statements for Sarnia and Windsor at 9:43 am, which was upgraded for Sarnia to a severe thunderstorm warning at 10:25 am. Severe thunderstorm watches for the London area followed at 10:41 am, upgraded to a severe thunderstorm warning at 11:08. The alert mentioned possible strong wind gusts up to 100 km/h (62 mph), along with nickel-sized hail.

Severe thunderstorm watches were issued for points eastward of London at 11:19 am. These were later upgraded to severe thunderstorm warnings.

Additionally, after the derecho hit London, Environment Canada issued an emergency alert for regions in Ontario and Quebec along the path of the storm, with alerts going out over cellphones, television, and radio. This was the first time Environment and Climate Change Canada (ECCC) issued an Alert Ready message for a Severe Thunderstorm Warning.

== Impact ==
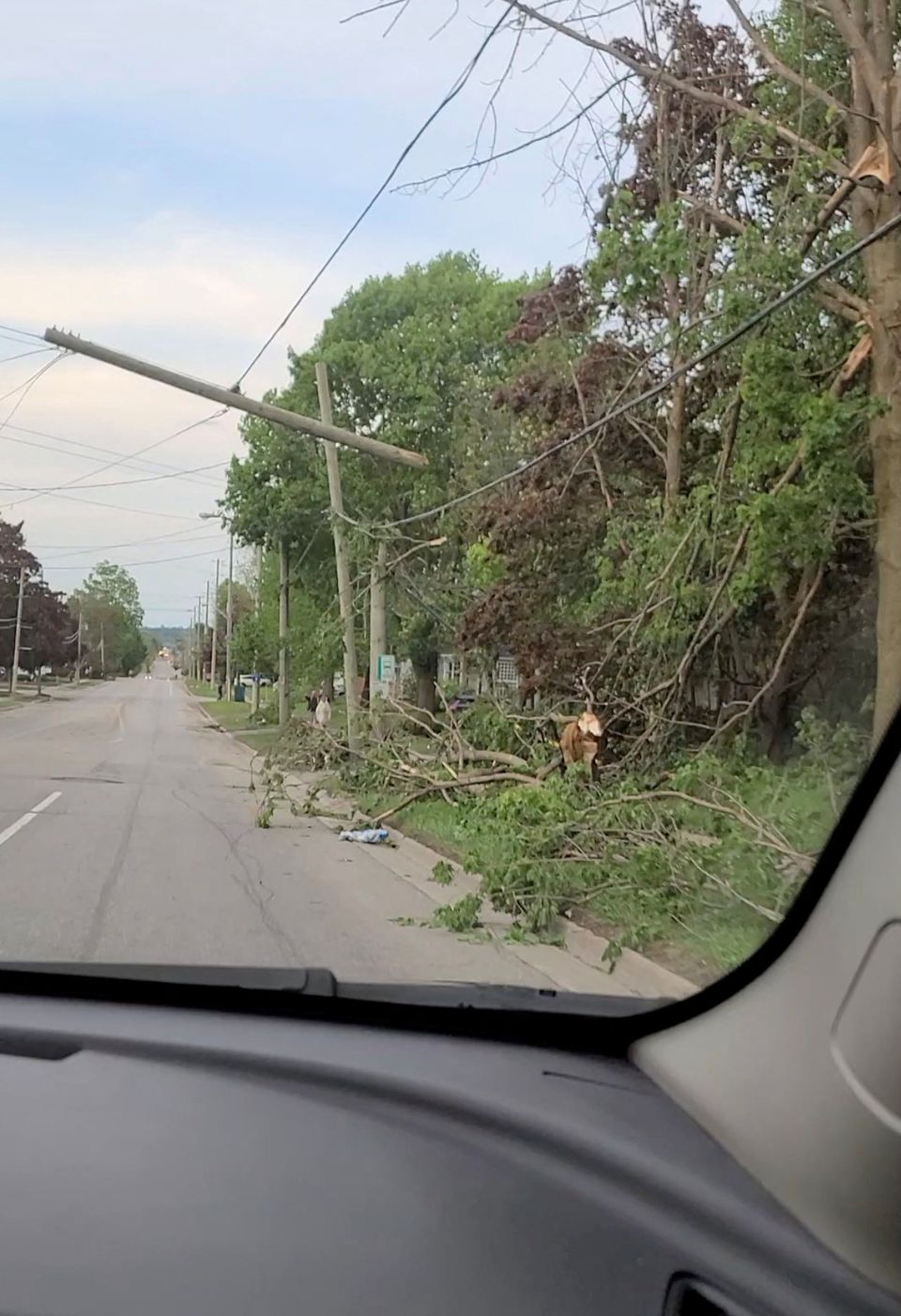
Downed utility lines and trees on Brock Street (London)

The derecho impacted roughly 15.6 million people, representing about 41 percent of Canada's population. Strong winds downed over 1,900 hydro poles, five metal transmission towers, and numerous trees along the path of the derecho. The damage included the downing of over 300 power poles in Ottawa. In Quebec, the Laurentides, Lanaudière, and l’Outaouais were most affected.

Eleven people were killed in eastern Ontario by windthrown trees or branches. Another person was killed after their boat sank in the Ottawa River near Gatineau, Quebec. Most of the victims were engaged in recreational activities on the holiday weekend.

Extensive damage was inflicted upon homes and buildings by wind and falling trees, with some homes completely destroyed. The communities of Stittsville, Hunt Club, Navan, and Sarsfield, where a church steeple was toppled and farms were destroyed, were the worst hit in the Ottawa area. The Saint-Fidèle church in Fassett also lost its steeple. In Rockland, a 30-ton silo was moved a foot and had its roof torn off.

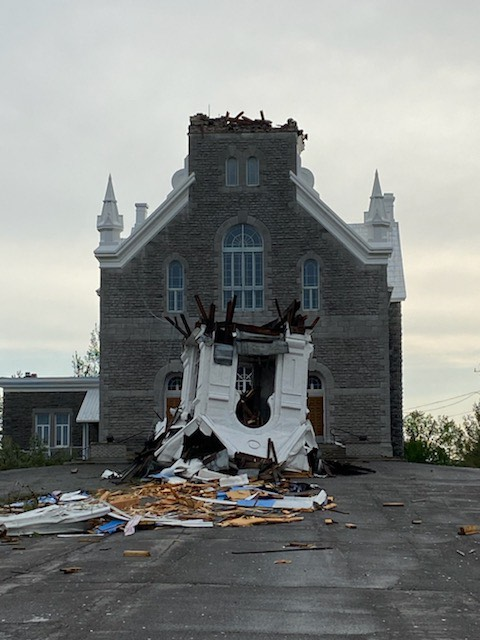
The destroyed church steeple in Sarsfield, Ontario

Power outages affected over 1.1 million customers, with 586,000 Hydro One outages in Ontario and 550,000 Hydro-Québec outages. In Ottawa, the airport and water treatment plant lost grid power for more than 24 hours. In a letter to Ottawa mayor Jim Watson, Hydro Ottawa described the damage dealt to its power distribution system as "beyond comprehension" and more severe than the 2018 tornadoes or the 1998 ice storm.

Rail and air transportation were significantly affected. Trains along the Windsor-Ottawa corridor were delayed by hours due to trees on the tracks, with some passengers having to be bussed to their destinations. Flights were delayed at Pearson International Airport, while a small plane at London International Airport was flipped over despite being strapped down. Subway trains in Toronto were stalled after one train ran over a downed tree.

== Aftermath ==
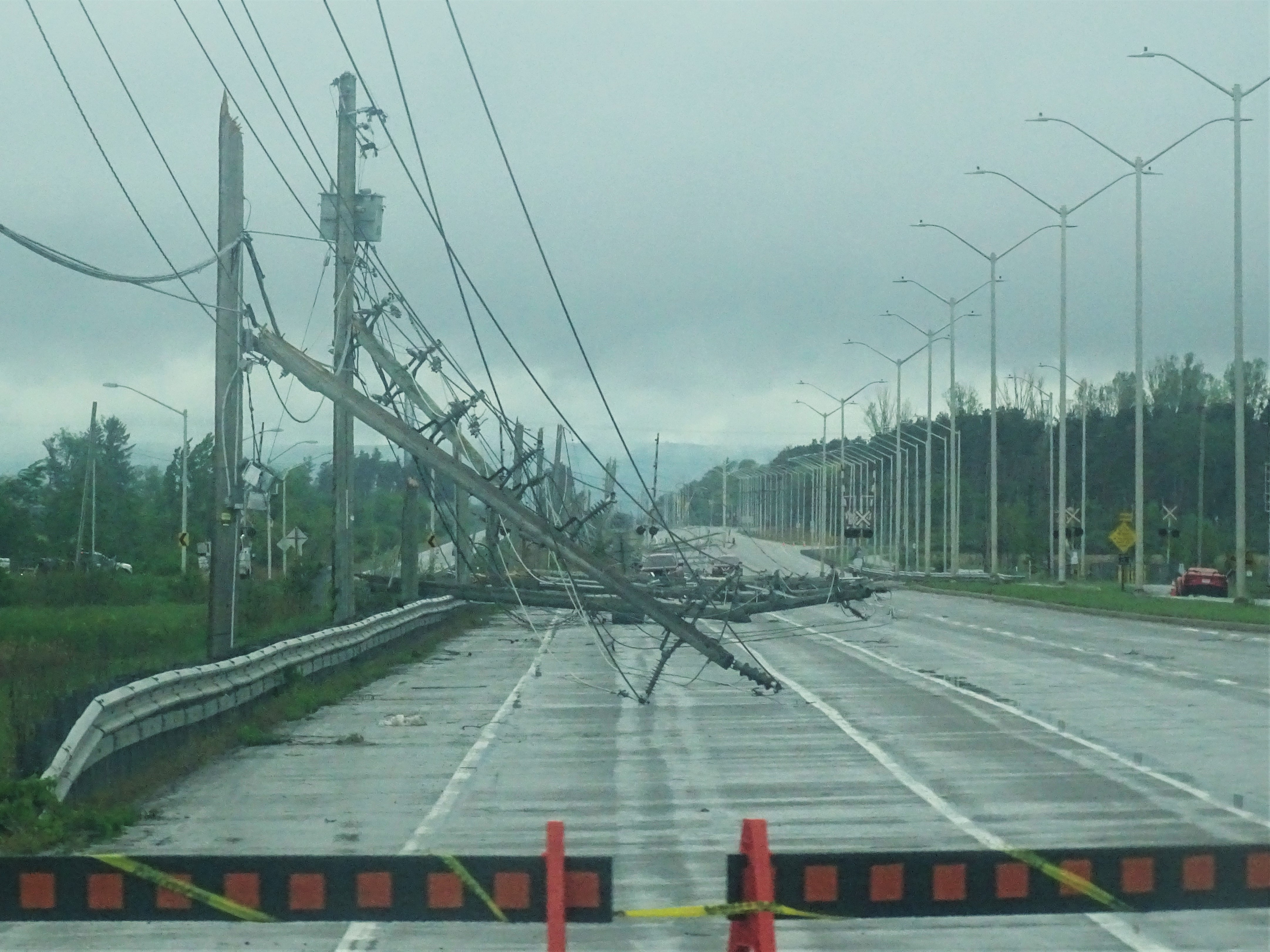
Downed power lines on Woodroffe Avenue (Ottawa)

The storm was the sixth-costliest event in Canadian history. It was also the most damaging storm ever experienced in Hydro Ottawa history, surpassing the January 1998 North American ice storm and the 2018 Ottawa tornadoes.

The municipal governments of Uxbridge and Clarence-Rockland declared local states of emergency on May 21. Peterborough declared a state of emergency on May 25. Ottawa did not declare a state of emergency; mayor Watson stated that the city had enough resources to handle the situation and that declaring a state of emergency would only amount to a symbolic gesture.

Due to the extensive infrastructure damage and large number of fallen trees, at least a quarter of outages in the hardest hit areas continued more than four days. Ottawa Hydro restored power to just over half its customers after one week. Three hundred Ottawa-area customers were still without power at the beginning of June. Some rural and remote Hydro One customers in the Perth, Bancroft, and Tweed areas remained without power for multiple weeks.

Forty percent of Quebec hydro outages continued two days after the storm hit. Five percent of customers lost power for more than a week.

Rogers and Bell reported widespread internet and television service outages in Ottawa and the surrounding area, but did not provide information on when service would return. Outages were also reported across southern Ontario.

Due to the Victoria Day holiday, most schools were able to open normally on Tuesday, although a few remained closed because they were still without power.

The National Capital Commission (NCC) greenbelt lost thousands of trees during the derecho, with every greenbelt sector affected. It was the first time the entire NCC greenbelt was closed. Some trails were still closed as of August 25. Red pine logs resulting from the fallen trees could be salvaged at no cost by the public, requiring only a land access permit.

=== Provincial election ===
I don’t think our contingency plans have ever gone to the extent of massively losing power for a considerable number of days in a wide swath of returning offices.

— Greg Essensa, chief electoral officer, Ontario

Advance poll voting for the 2022 Ontario provincial election was disrupted by the power outages and by falling trees, particularly in the London, Kitchener-Waterloo, Brampton, Peterborough, and Ottawa regions. Forty-nine advance polls closed after they lost power or were damaged by falling trees or wires, either temporarily or for the day. Some advance poll locations had to be removed or changed, but all locations retained at least one advance poll per riding. One of the London tornadoes brushed the Stronach Community Recreation Centre, where one of the London—Fanshawe advance polls was based.

Provincial elections in Ontario are computerized, but are designed to be used with paper ballots and contingency ballot boxes, as well as hardcopy backups of the electors list. Many polls lacking power were able to operate with natural light. No votes were lost.

=== Government assistance ===
At the federal level, Prime Minister Justin Trudeau offered federal aid to severely affected communities.

Locally, Ottawa and Peterborough opened respite centres, with showers and charging stations. Tweed opened a water filling station at its municipal office. Ottawa and Gatineau also offered emergency food aid.

To assist small business owners who had been severely affected by the derecho, Renfrew County offered relief loans to small businesses at 0% interest, with deferred payments for one year.

== Gallery ==
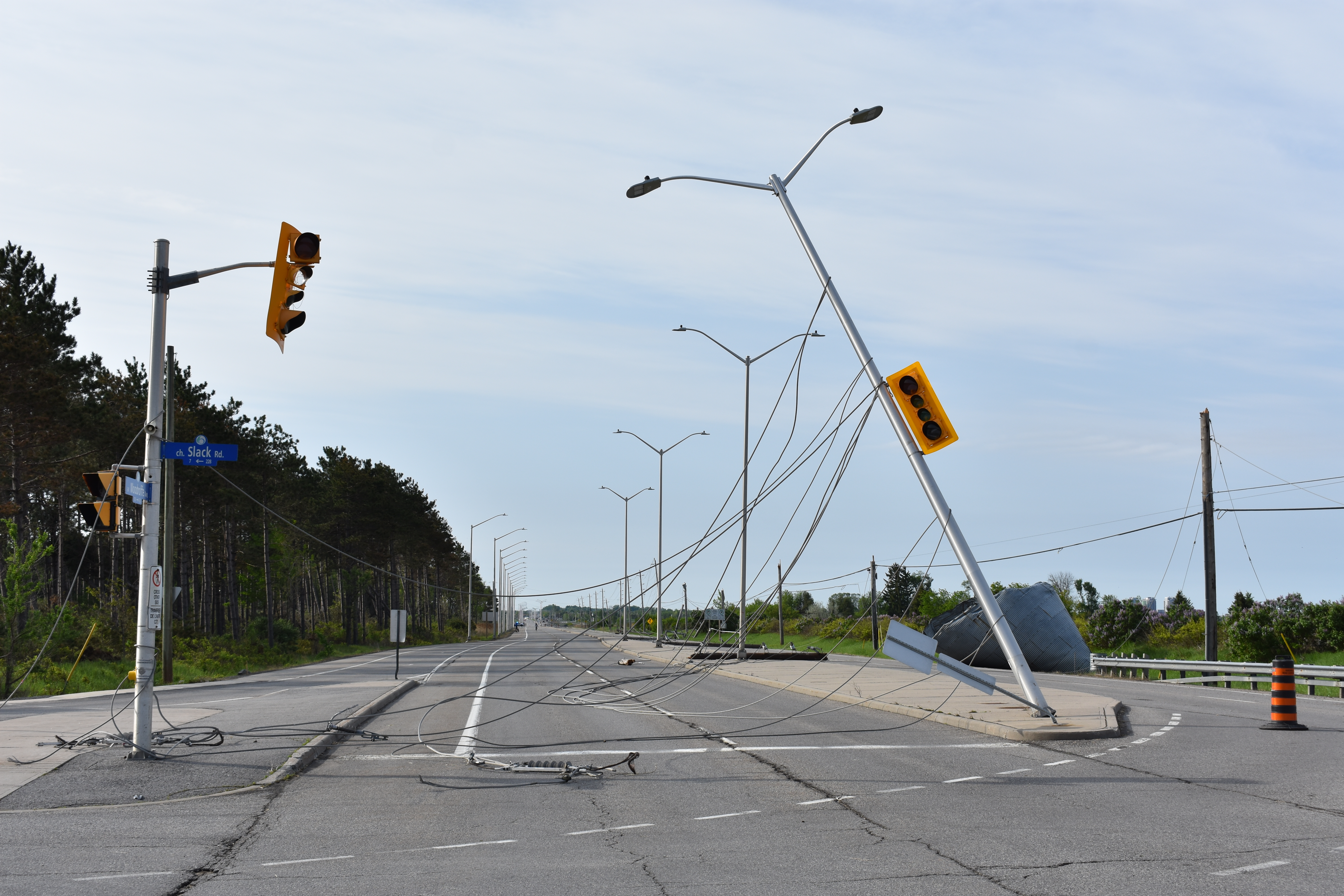
Storm damage on Woodroffe Avenue at Slack Road. (Ottawa)

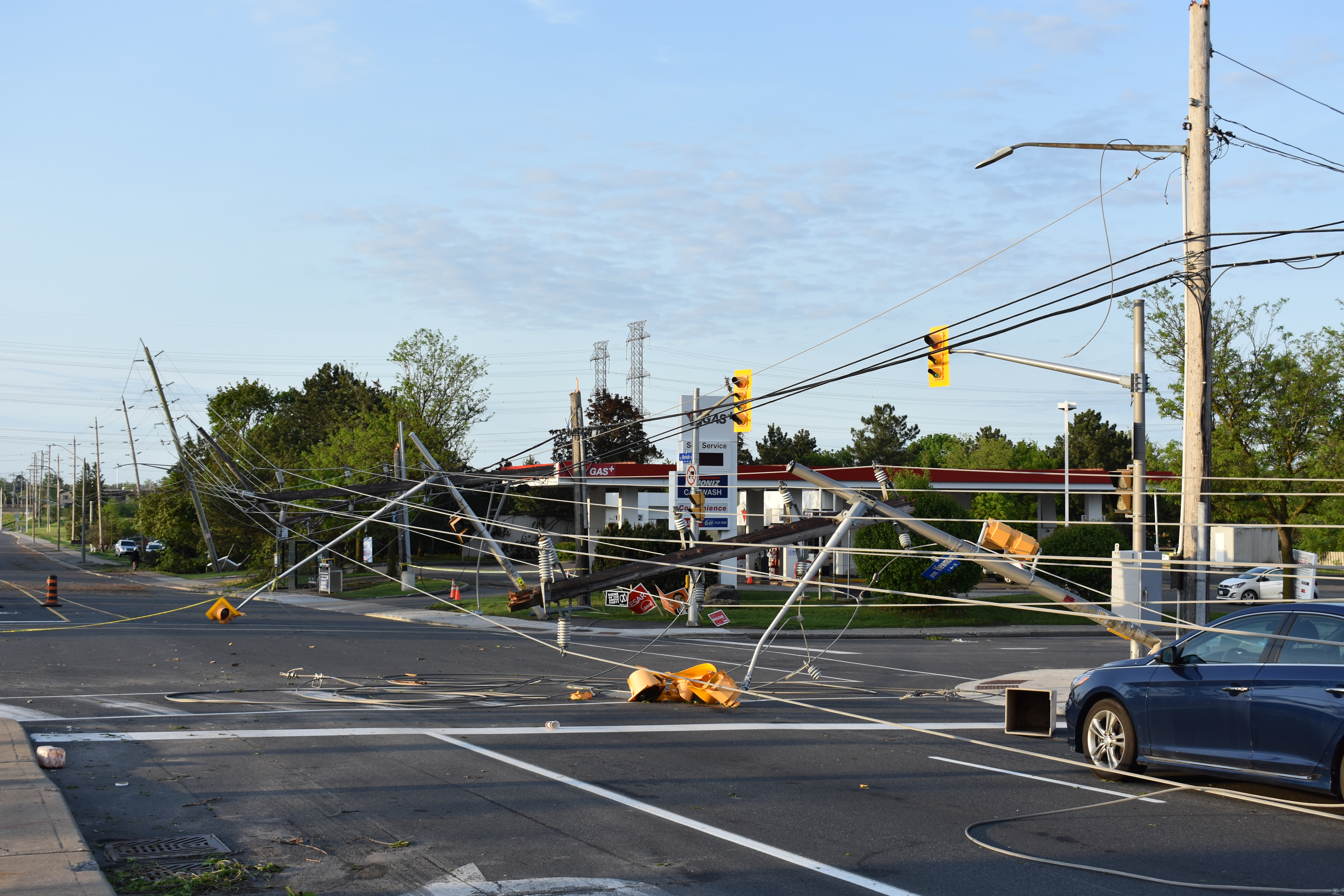
Storm damage on Merivale Road at Viewmount Drive, facing South. (Ottawa)

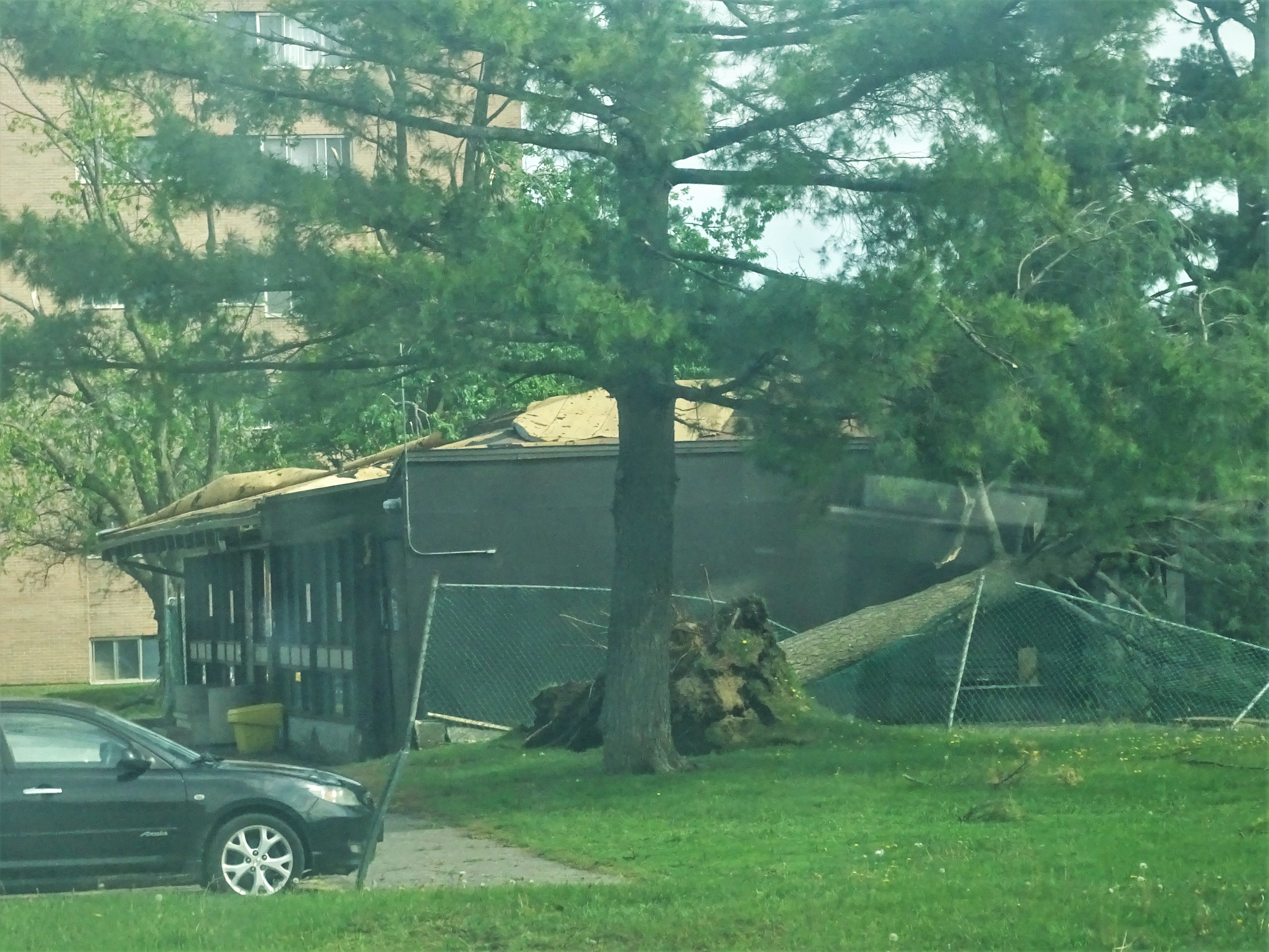
Storm damage in Windsor Park Village (Ottawa)

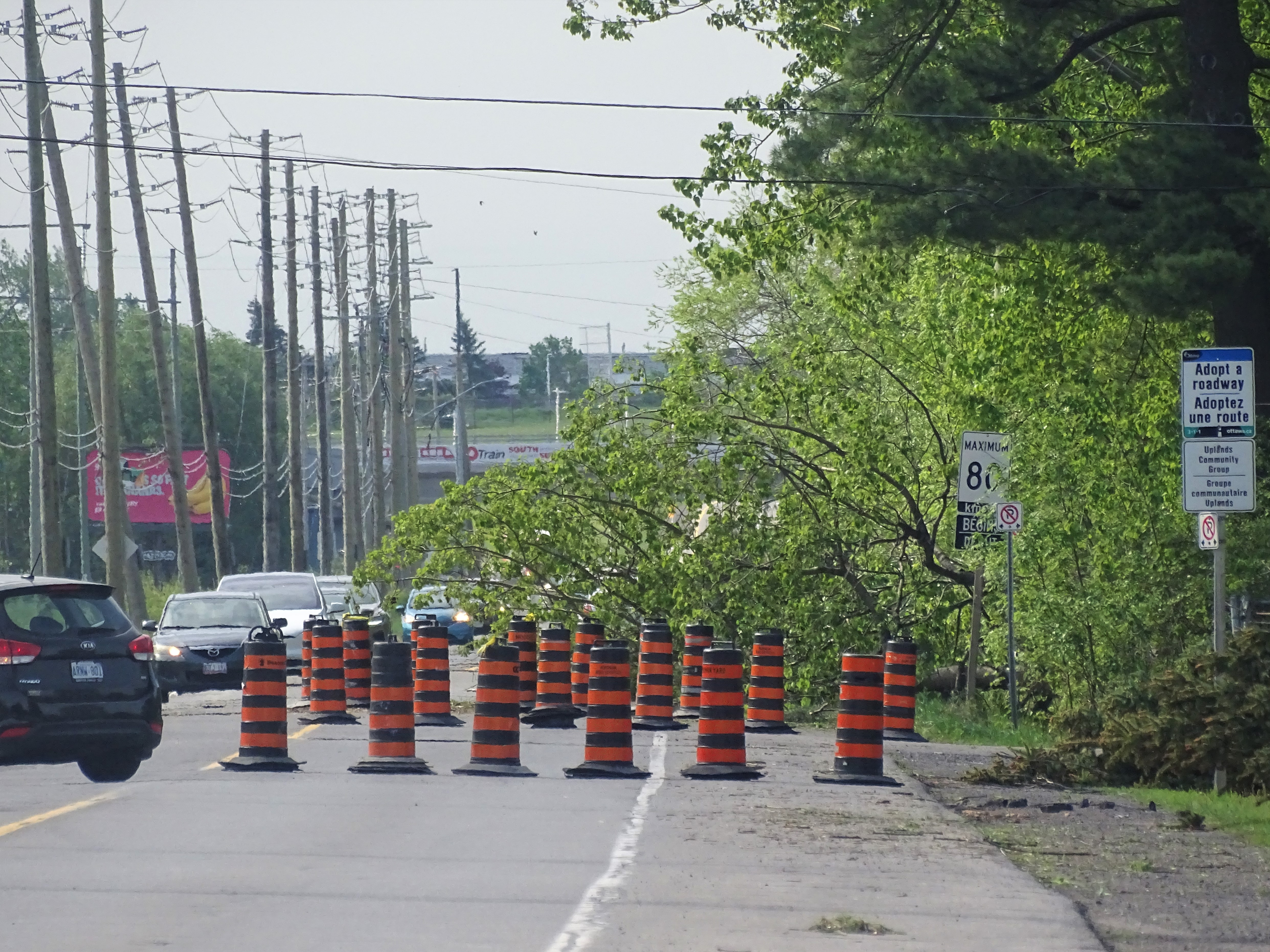
Downed trees on Uplands Drive (Ottawa)

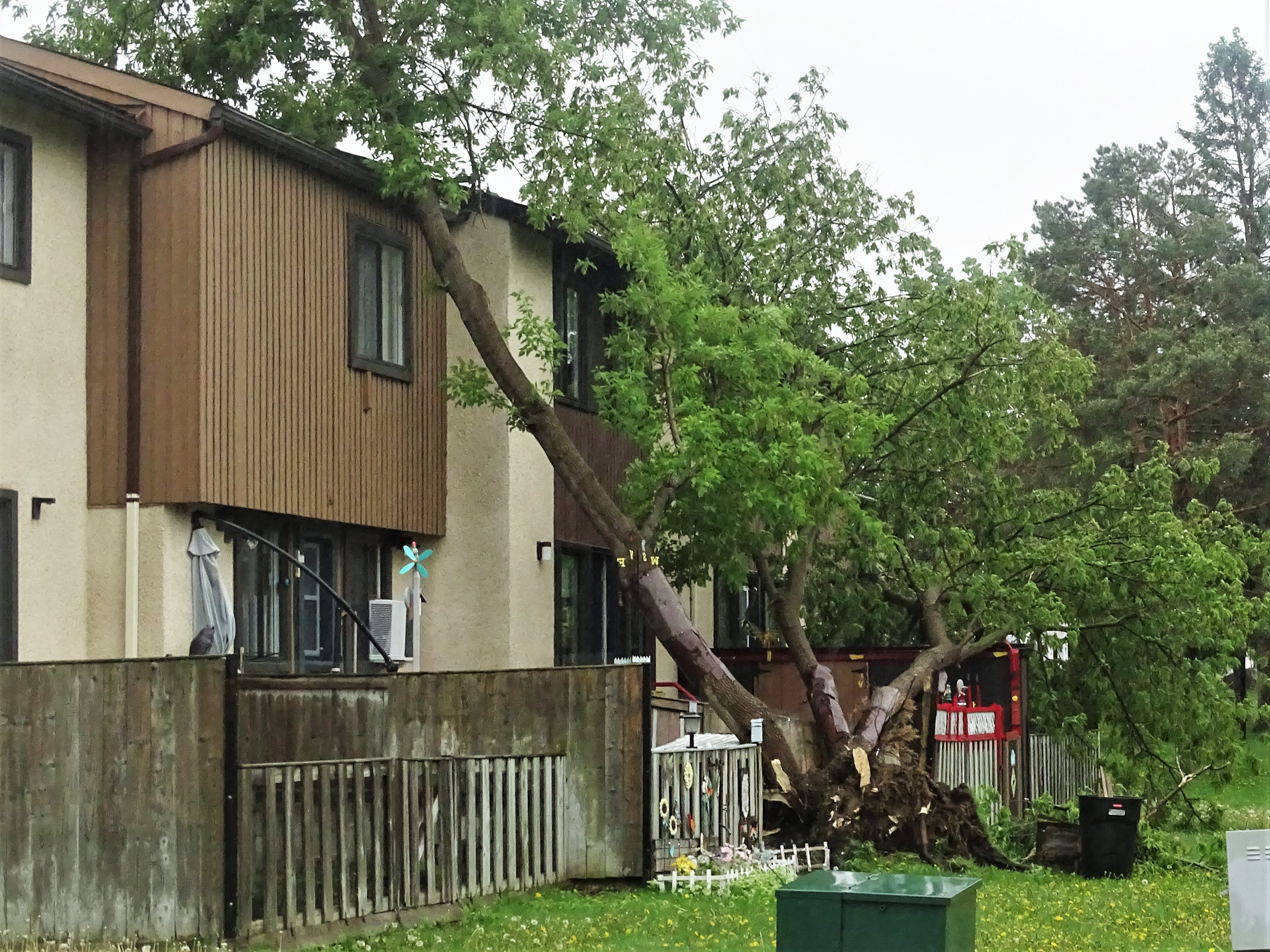
Storm damage in Tanglewood (Ottawa)

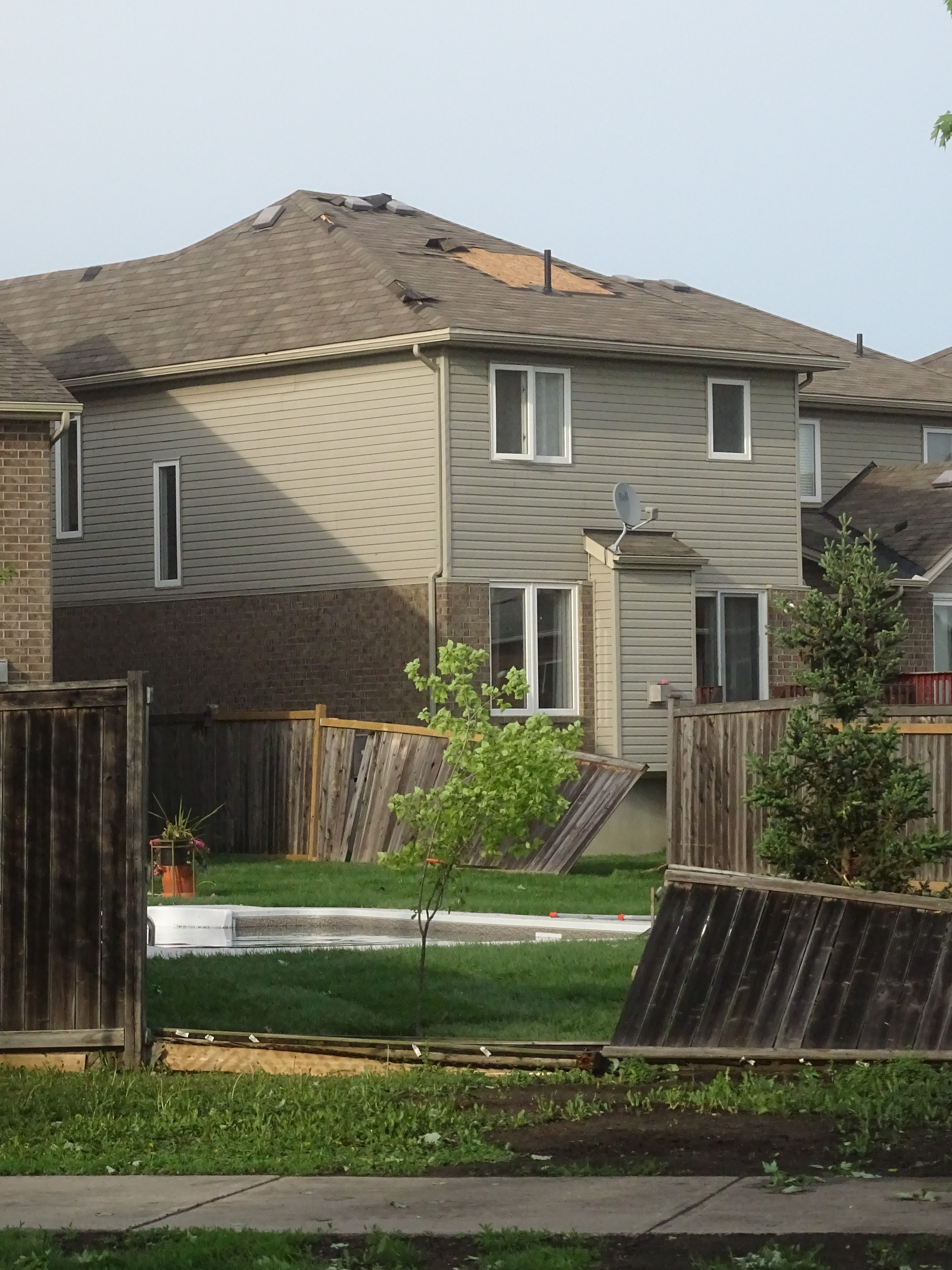
Storm damage in Riverside South (Ottawa)

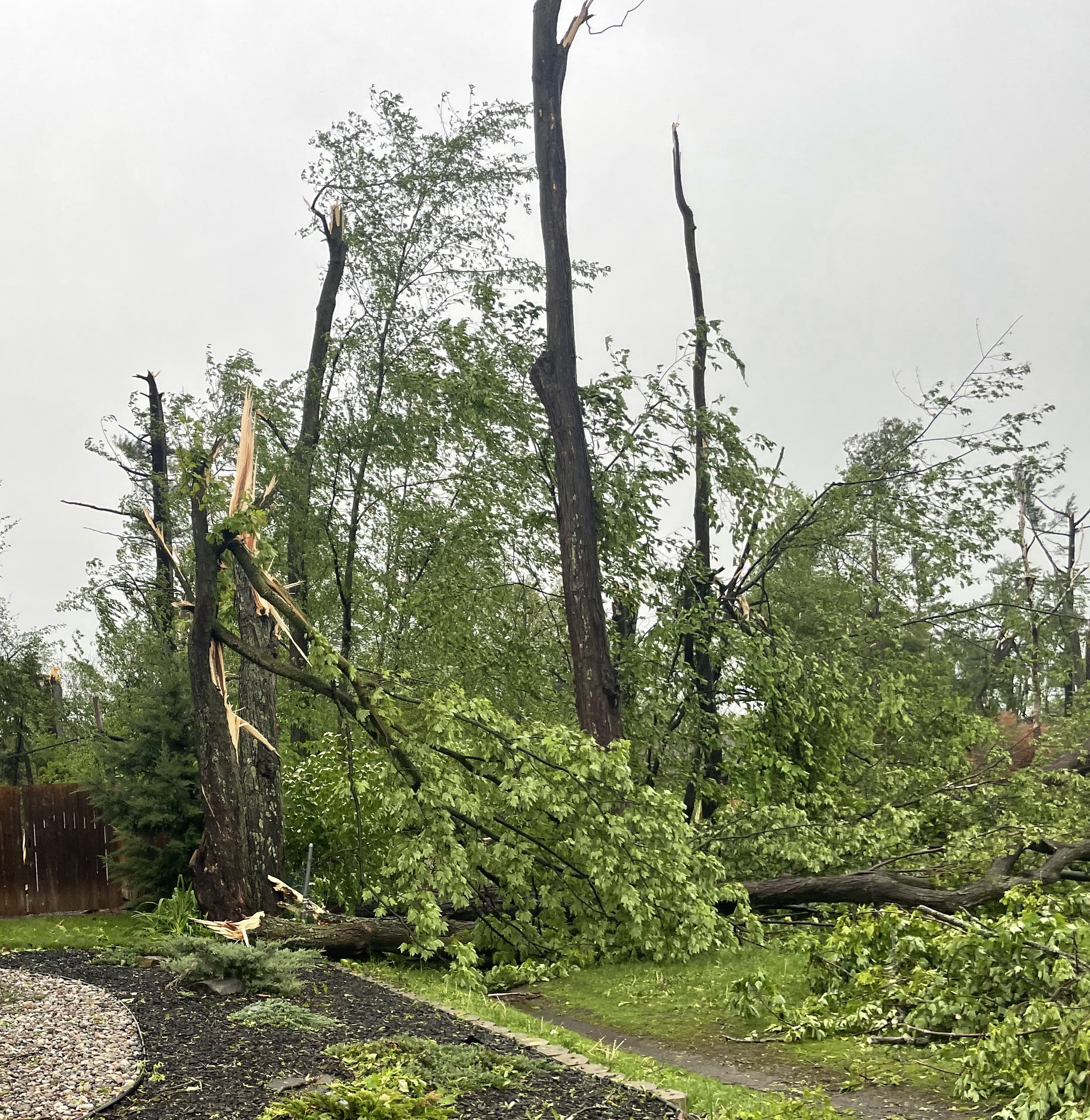
Tree damage, Amberwood Crescent, Country Place (Ottawa)

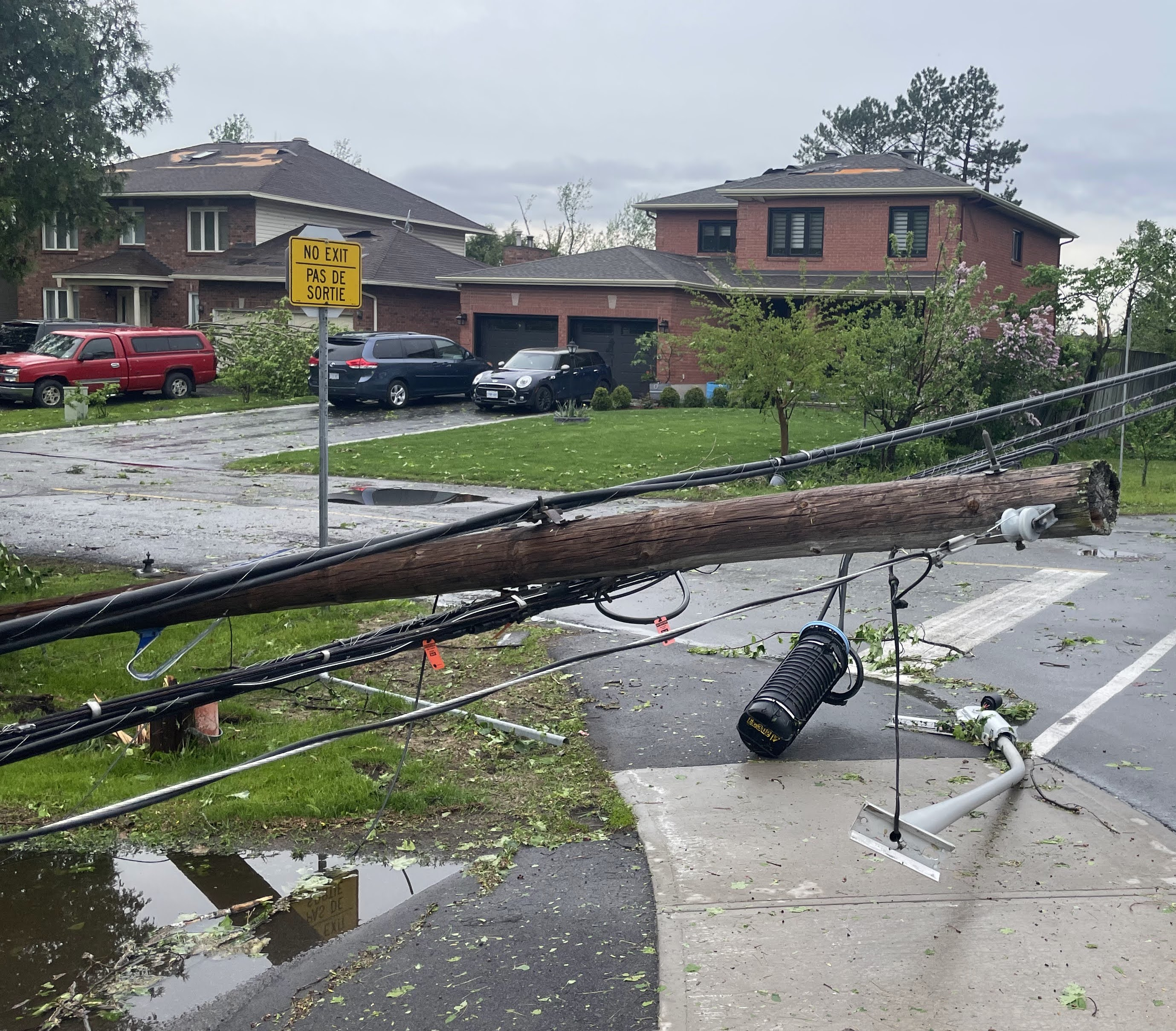
Utility line and roof damage May 21, 2022, Merivale Road (Ottawa)

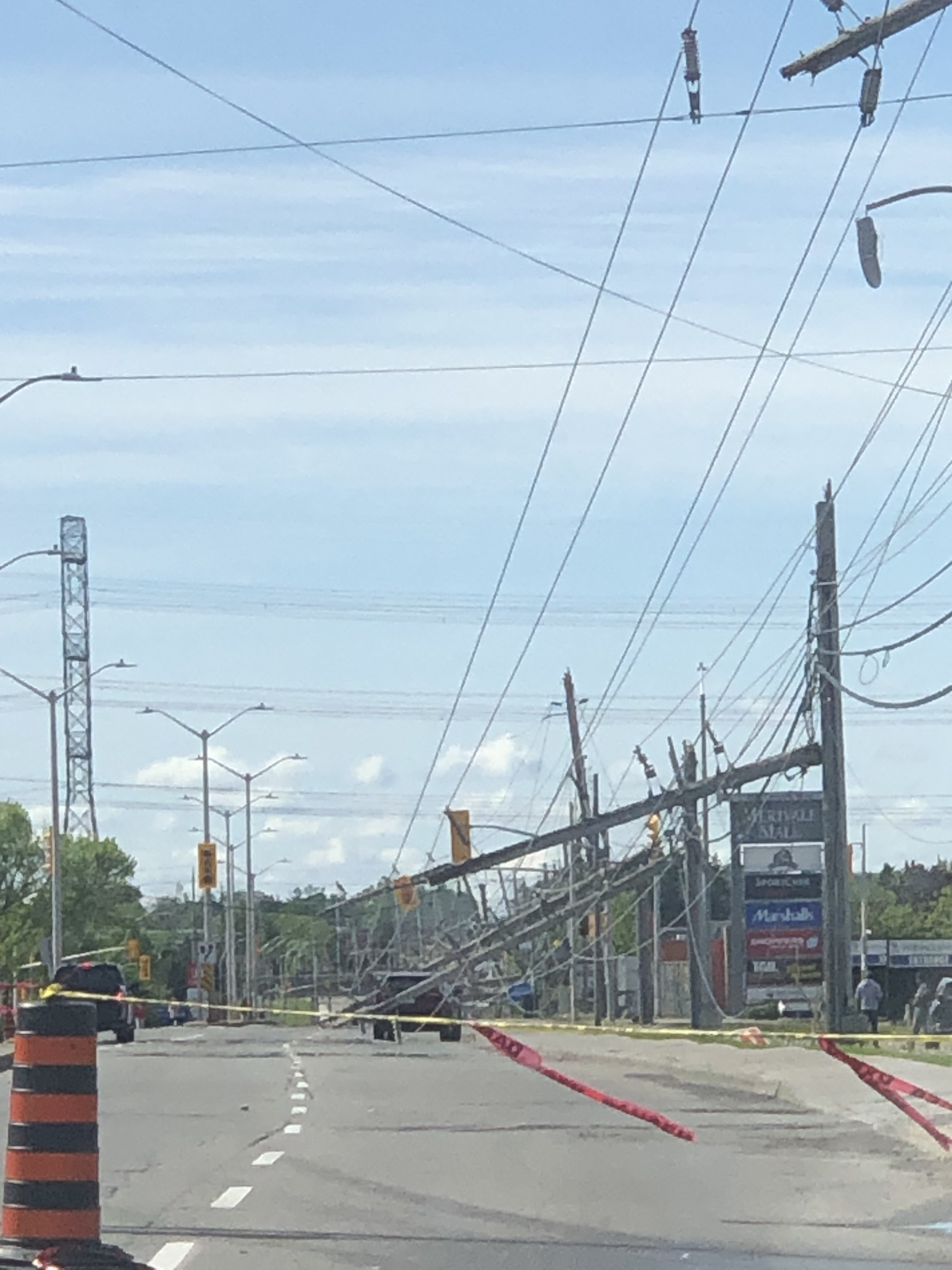
Storm damage in Ottawa on Merivale Road from the derecho on Saturday, May 21st, 2022, near Family Brown Lane, facing South.

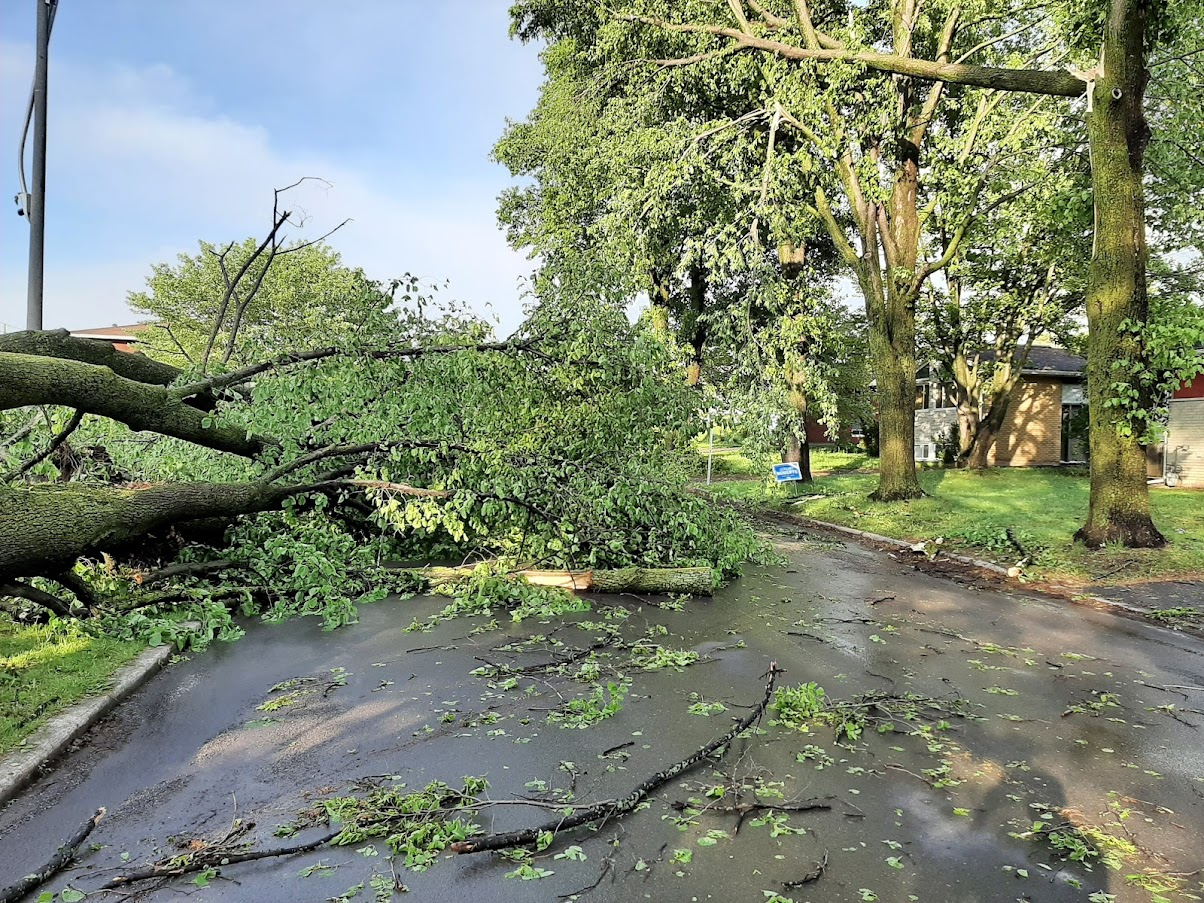
Downed trees on Adirondack Drive, Kenson Park (Ottawa)

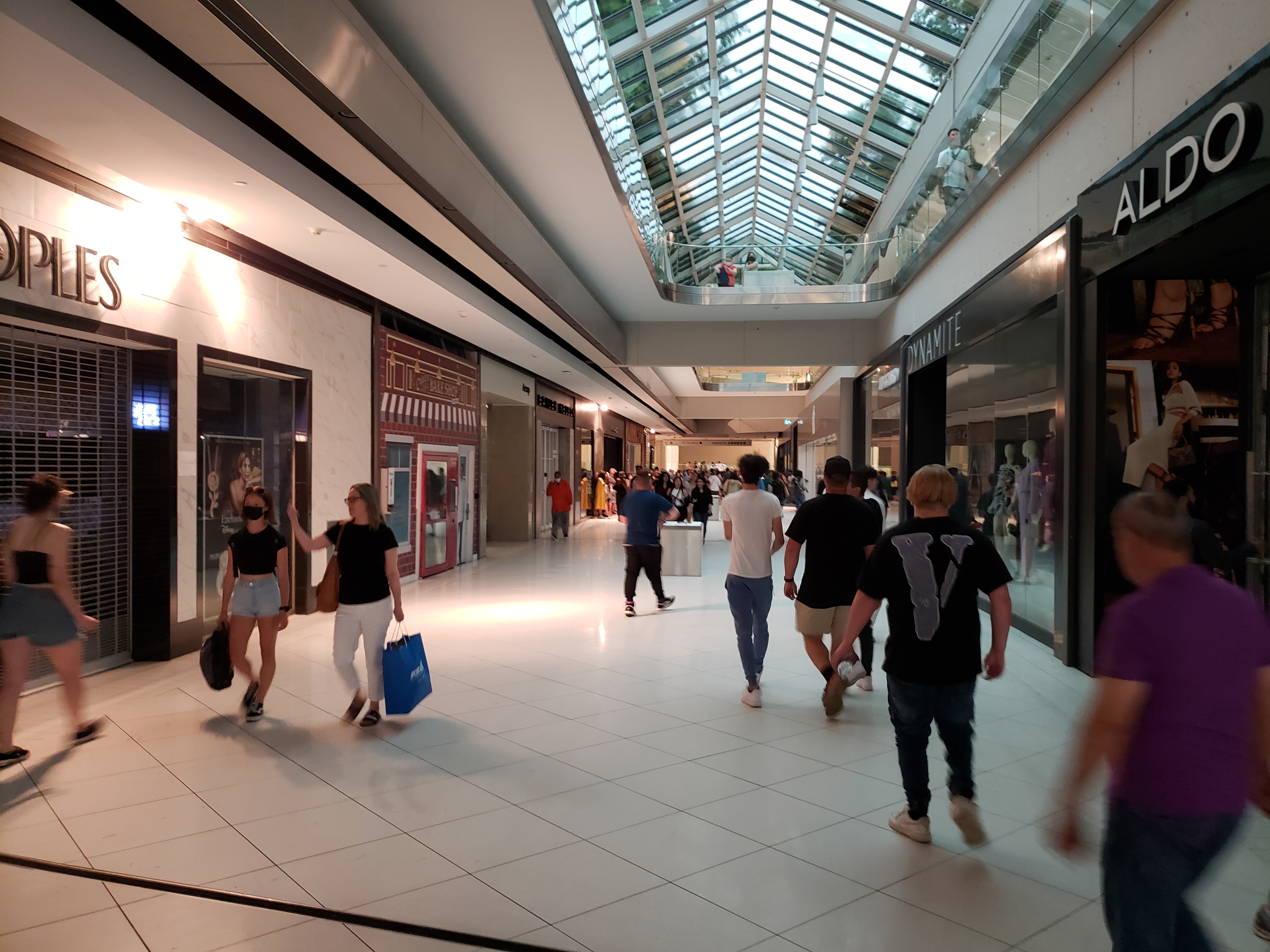
Rideau Centre mall closed early as power was knocked out

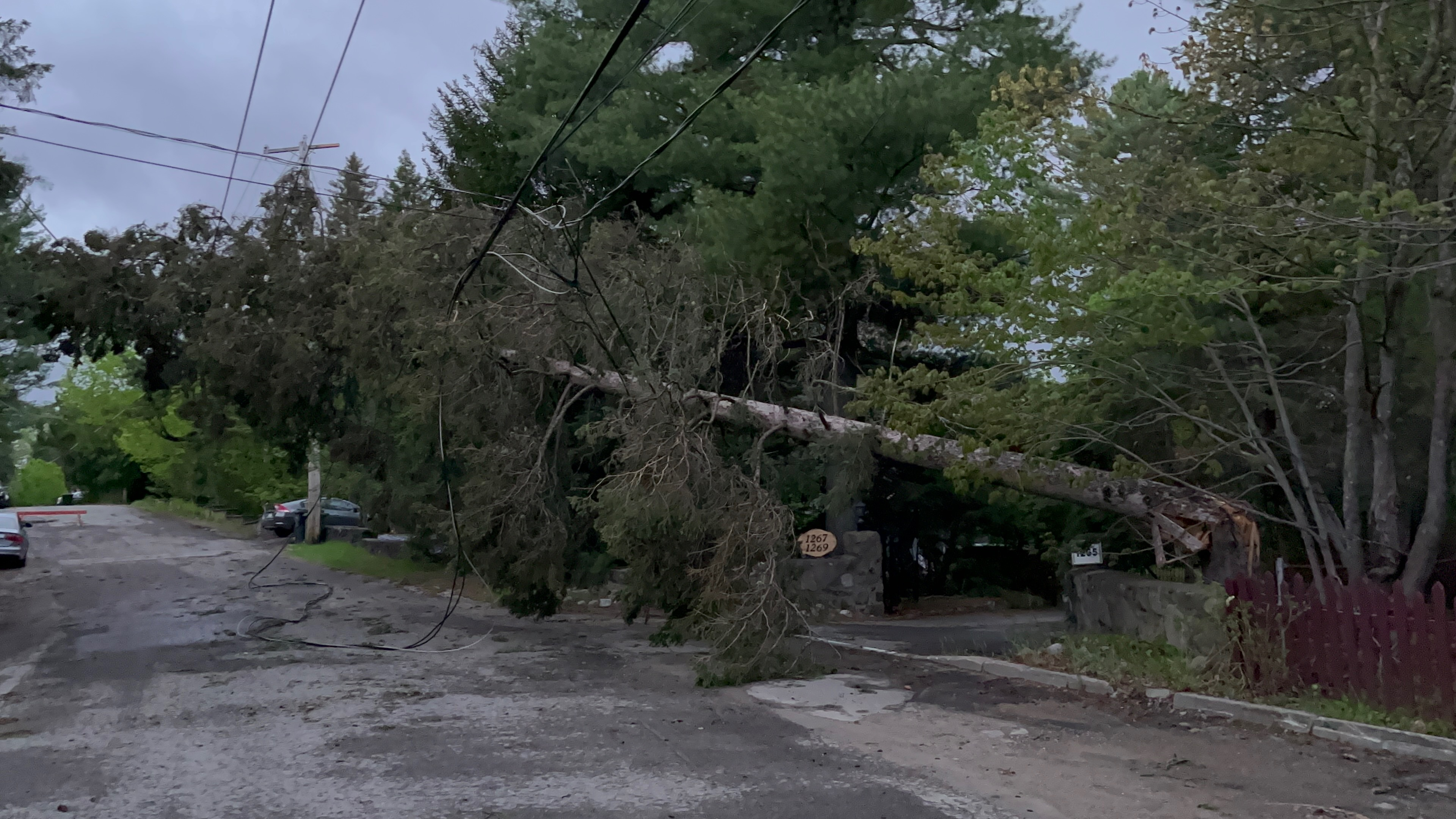
Storm damage in Val-David QC, rue Lavoie

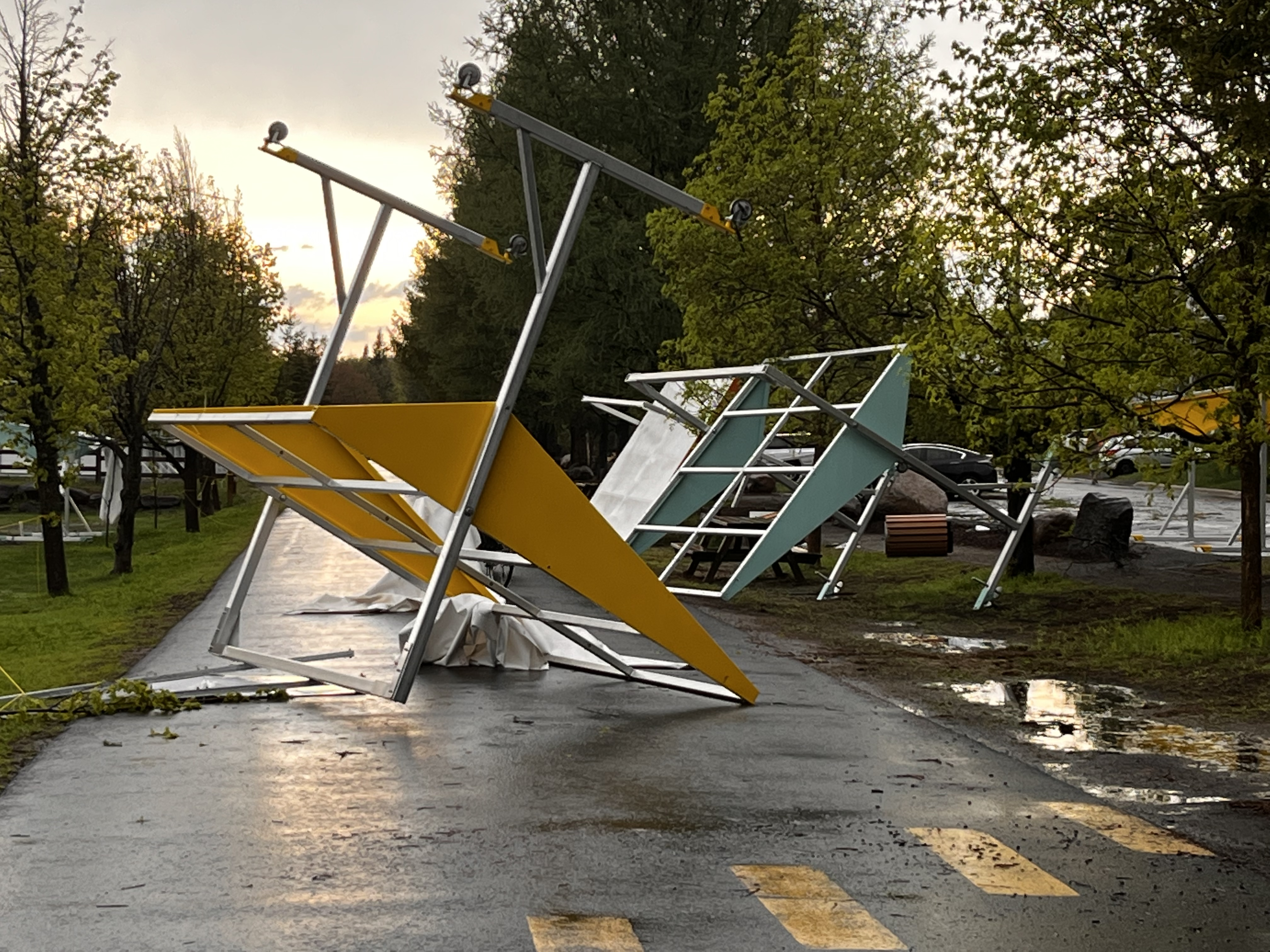
Storm damage in Val-David QC, parc Léonidas-Dufresne

== See also ==
- List of derecho events
- List of North American tornadoes and tornado outbreaks
- May 2022 Midwest derecho - similar derecho nine days earlier in the Midwestern United States
- Heat wave of 1995 derecho series - produced two derechos in Southern Ontario
- Late-May 1998 tornado outbreak and derecho
- Boundary Waters–Canadian derecho
- Heat wave of 2006 derecho series - produced two derechos in Ontario and Quebec
- Weather of 2022
