= Briargreen =

Neighborhood in Ottawa, Ontario, Canada

Coordinates: 45°20′14″N 75°46′50″W

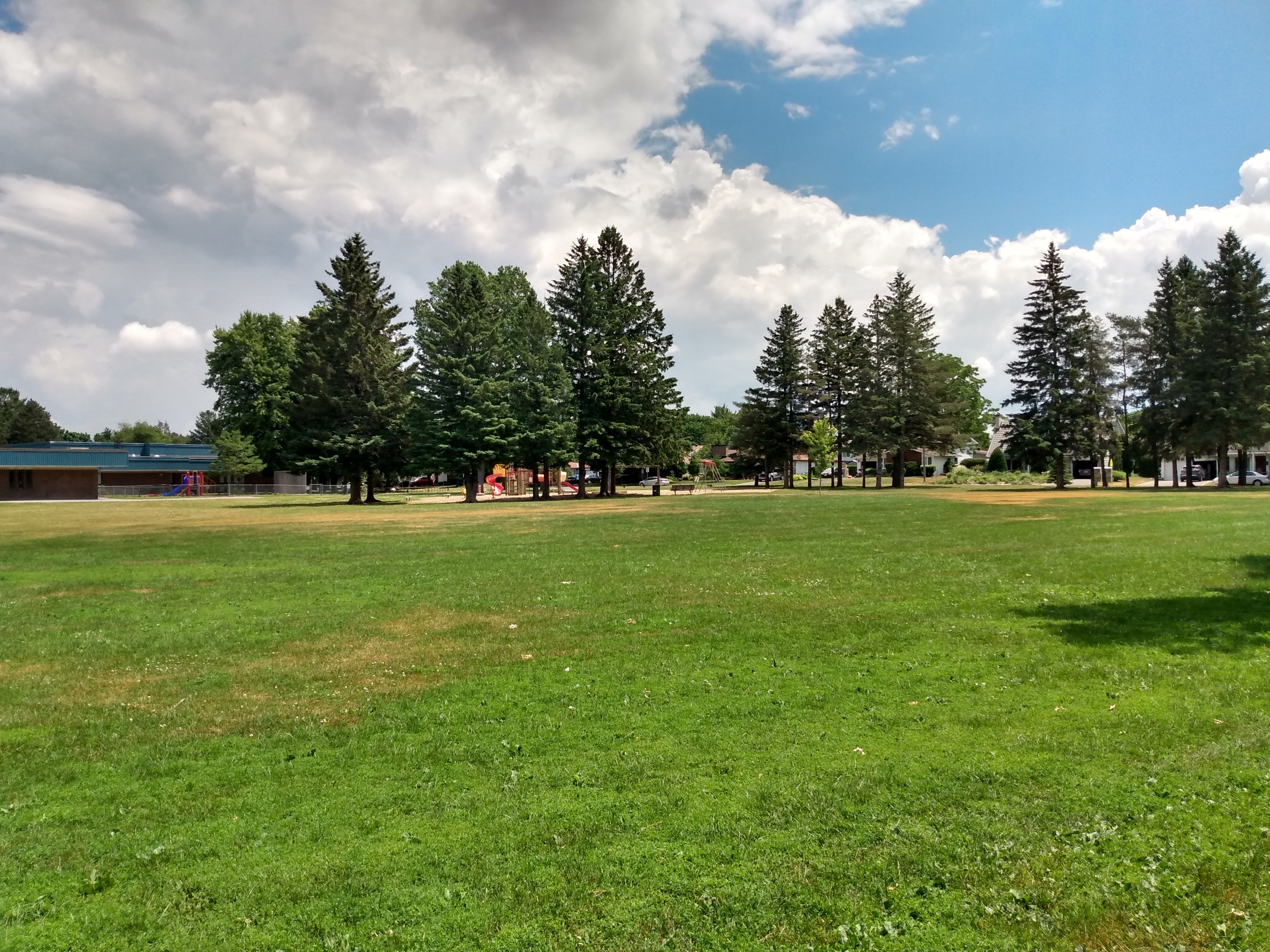
Briargreen Park

Briargreen is a suburban neighbourhood located in College Ward in the west end of Ottawa, Ontario, Canada. Prior to amalgamation in 2001 it was located in the City of Nepean. The borders of the neighbourhood are Pinecrest Cemetery to the north, Centrepointe to the east, Craig Henry to the south, and Greenbank Road to the west. The community was built in the late 1960s to early 1970s same time as the nearby neighbourhoods of Leslie Park and Arlington Woods. The main roads in the community are Ashgrove Crescent and Meadowbank Drive.

The neighbourhood is surrounded by banks and trees as it was originally a forest. Briargreen Public School is situated in the heart of the community. There is a city park immediately to the west of the school. Pinecrest Cemetery is nearby to the north. Also in the north part of the neighbourhood is Rockway Crescent which features a community called Forest Ridge Apartments featuring a high rise apartment building, two low rises and garden homes.

As of the Canada 2011 Census the neighbourhood had a population of 2,043 and 829 private dwellings.
