= Craig Henry =

Residential neighbourhood, Ottawa, Canada

Coordinates: 45°20′N 75°46′W

Craig Henry is a residential neighbourhood in Knoxdale-Merivale Ward in the west end of Ottawa, Canada. It is located in the former city of Nepean. It is a residential subdivision that was developed from 1971. The neighbourhood is bordered by Woodroffe Avenue to the east, Greenbank Road to the west, Knoxdale Road to the south and the CN railroad separating it from Centrepointe and Briargreen to the north. The land previously belonged to the Craig Henry farm, and was developed by Jack Aaron.

According to the Canada 2011 Census the total population of the neighbourhood was 6,593. Craig Henry has a significant Jewish population. The 2011 National Household Survey indicated that 12% of the Census Tract's population was Jewish.

The neighbourhood is covered by the Craig Henry Community Association.

On September 21, 2018 Craig Henry along with the neighbouring area of Arlington Woods were hit by an EF-2 Tornado with winds reaching 225kmh. The Tornado caused extensive damage to many homes and businesses in both communities.

== Area schools ==
There are a number of schools in the area, including Knoxdale Public School, Briargreen Public School, Greenbank Middle School (closed in June 2017), Abdulgadir School of Hope, St. John XXIII Elementary School, and Manordale Public School. Sir Robert Borden High School has students in grades 7 through 12 .

== Landmarks ==
- Congregation Beit Tikvah of Ottawa (formerly Beth Shalom West), a synagogue is situated right in the heart of Craig Henry.
- Craig Henry Tennis Club

== Parks ==
- Craig Henry Park – Has a play structure, is linked by a bike path to Sir Robert Borden High School and by a walking/cycling underpass to Centrepointe, also home of the Craig Henry Tennis Club.
- Charing Park – Has a play structure, tobogganing hill, hockey rink / basketball court and water fountain.
- Knoxdale Road Park – A smaller park with a play structure and a new splash pad (Built in the summer of 2013).
- Ben Franklin Soccer Dome - Has two large soccer fields, a small gym, change rooms, and a meeting room. Opened in 2007, its location is at Knoxdale and West Hunt Club Road.
- Bateman Park - Runs from the south side of Bateman Road to the Hydro right-of-way - has a playground with a play structure and a swing set. There is a small decorative wooden bridge over a culvert in the middle of the park.
