= Nepean, Ontario =

Nepean
- Former municipality
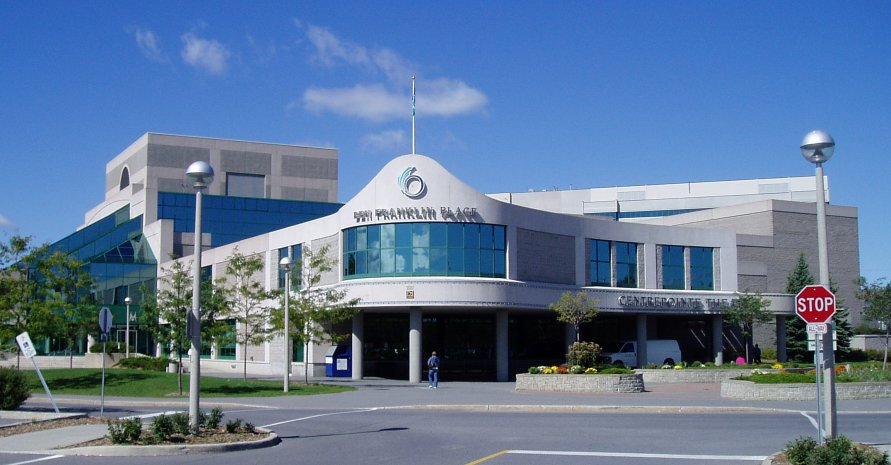
- Ben Franklin Place, former city hall of Nepean

- Flag Logo

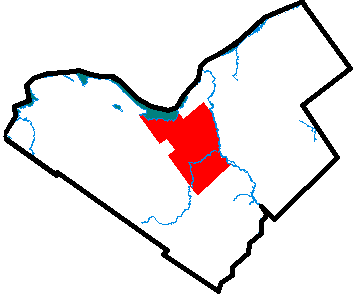
- The limits of the former City of Nepean within the current City of Ottawa
- Coordinates: 45°20′30″N 75°45′30″W
- Country: Canada
- Province: Ontario
- Municipality: Ottawa
- Established: 1792
- Incorporated: 1978
- Amalgamated: 2001

Government
  - City councillors: Wilson Lo, David Hill, Theresa Kavanagh, Laine Johnson, Sean Devine, David Brown
  - Member of Parliament: Anita Vandenbeld, Mark Carney
  - Member of Provincial Parliament: Tyler Watt, Chandra Pasma

Area
  - Land: 217.00 km^{2} (83.78 sq mi)
- Area in 2001 at time of merger

Population (2021)
  - Total: 186,593
  - Density: 859.88/km^{2} (2,227.1/sq mi)
- Time zone: UTC−5 (Eastern (EST))
  - Summer (DST): UTC−4 (EDT)
- Area codes: 613, 343, 753

Nepean (/nəˈpiːən/ nə-PEE-ən) is an area of Ottawa, Ontario, Canada. Located west of Ottawa's inner core, it was an independent city until amalgamated with the Regional Municipality of Ottawa–Carleton in 2001 to become the new city of Ottawa. However, the name Nepean continues in common usage in reference to the area. The population of Nepean is about 186,593 people (2021 Census).

Nepean's policies of operational and capital budgeting prudence contrasted with the budget philosophies of some other municipalities in the area. Nepean instituted a strict 'pay-as-you-go' budgeting scheme. The city entered amalgamation with a large surplus and a record of tax restraint. However, most big-ticket municipal infrastructure items (transit, garbage collection, sanitary sewers, water, arterial roads, social services) were the responsibility of the Regional Municipality of Ottawa-Carleton. It maintained its own library system from 1954 to amalgamation, its own police force from 1964 until it was regionalized in the 1990s; its own fire service and its own recreation programs. Hydro services were the responsibility of the Hydro-Electric Commission of the City of Nepean (commonly referred to as Nepean Hydro). Education in the City of Nepean was provided by the Carleton Board of Education (later amalgamated with the Ottawa Board of Education to form the Ottawa-Carleton District School Board).

Prior to amalgamation, Nepean's City Council spent many tax dollars aggressively campaigning against what they (and their allies) referred to as the "megacity" model. The central plank of the strategy was to promote a tri-city model, which would have seen the ten municipalities of the Ottawa region reduced to three: one in the west (comprising Nepean, Kanata and the western rural municipalities), one in the east (comprising Gloucester, Cumberland and the eastern rural municipalities) and one in the centre (comprising Ottawa, Vanier and Rockcliffe Park). These efforts were in vain, as the one-city model eventually prevailed. (The one-city model was recommended by Glen Shortliffe, who was appointed by the Government of Ontario to study the issue of municipal reform in Ottawa-Carleton.)

== History ==
Nepean Township, originally known as Township D, was established in 1792 and originally included what is now the central area of Ottawa west of the Rideau River. Jehiel Collins, from Vermont, is believed to have been the first person to settle in Nepean Township, on the future site of Bytown. Nepean was incorporated as a city on November 24, 1978. The geographic boundaries of Nepean changed considerably over this time; the original town hall of the township of Nepean was located in Westboro, which was annexed in 1950 by the city of Ottawa. Nepean's centre then moved to the community of Bells Corners. In the 1950 and 1960s, Nepean's urban area began to expand in previous rural areas in such areas as the community of Centrepointe in the east, and the community of Barrhaven in the south.

In 1853, the City of Nepean realized that a community library was needed. By means of a bylaw and a tax levy, a library was created. In 1870, a large fire swept through Nepean, destroying several of the schoolhouses where books were stored. For the next eighty years, the library was but a memory. It was in 1951, when Ruth E. Dickinson moved to Nepean from Calgary, that she become the driving force to develop a library in Nepean. The Nepean Public Library was officially opened on March 1, 1957 and was originally known as the City View Public Library. It became the Nepean Township Public Library on December 27, 1962.

Prior to its amalgamation with 10 other municipalities into the new city of Ottawa in 2001, the population of Nepean was 124,878. The 2006 census population was 138,596.

Nepean was named after Sir Evan Nepean, British Under-Secretary of State for the Home Department from 1782 to 1791.

A Nepean quarry provided the sandstone blocks that were the principal building material used in the Parliament Buildings in downtown Ottawa.

In September 2018, Nepean was one of the regions hit by a powerful storm that spawned six tornados in the Ottawa area, causing widespread damage to the Arlington Woods, Craig Henry and Colonnade Road Business Park areas.

=== Mayors/Reeves ===
Flag of Nepean, used from 1980 until c. 1991

- 1978 Andrew Haydon
- 1978–97 Ben Franklin
- 1997–2001 Mary Pitt

== Geography ==
=== Communities and neighbourhoods ===
Prior to amalgamation, the following communities and neighbourhoods were within the city boundaries:

- Arlington Woods
- Ashdale
- Barrhaven
  - Cedarhill
  - Chapman Mills
  - Davidson Heights
  - Half Moon Bay
  - Heart's Desire
  - Jockvale
  - Longfields
  - Old Barrhaven
  - Rideau Glen
  - Stonebridge
- Bayshore
- Bells Corners
- Belltown
- Borden Farm
- Briargreen
- Bruce Farm
- Carleton Heights
- Centrepointe
- Craig Henry
- Crestview
- Crystal Beach
- City View
- Country Place
- Fallowfield
- Fairfield Heights
- Fisher Glen
- Fisher Heights
- Grenfell Glen
- Leslie Park
- Manordale
- Meadowlands
- Merivale Gardens
- Parkwood Hills
- Pineglen
- Qualicum-Graham Park
- Ryan Farm
- Shirleys Bay
- Skyline
- Tanglewood
- Trend Village
- Twin Elm
- Woodvale

=== Climate ===
Nepean has a humid continental climate (Köppen Dfb), with warm, humid summers and cold winters. The summers start in early June and end in late September with an average summer high temperature of 27 °C (81 °F). In Nepean, summers have about 220 mm (8.7 in) of rain. There is a 95% chance that all the precipitation comes by thunderstorms in the summer. There is also a small chance of cool, average rainy days in the summertime, especially in June. Nepean is also the Ottawa suburb that has the most hours of sunshine, with an average of 2,100 hours each year. In the winter, Nepean gets about 150–200 cm (59–79 in) of snow yearly with an average temperature of −5 °C (23 °F). Spring starts around late March and lasts until late May, with temperatures of about 10–15 °C (50–59 °F). The springtime has about 165 mm (6.5 in) of rain a year. The average temperature for fall is around 10 °C (50 °F). Autumn is the driest season in Nepean with only 100 mm (3.9 in) of rainfall annually. The gardening zone for this area is 6A.

== Demographics ==
Nepean, Ontario Historical populations

Year	Pop.	±%
1901	5,840	—
1911	5,170	−11.5%
1921	10,867	+110.2%
1931	11,142	+2.5%
1941	13,859	+24.4%
1951	3,744	−73.0%
1956	9,183	+145.3%

Year	Pop.	±%
1961	19,753	+115.1%
1966	43,919	+122.3%
1971	64,606	+47.1%
1976	76,892	+19.0%
1981	84,361	+9.7%
1986	95,490	+13.2%
1991	107,627	+12.7%

Year	Pop.	±%
1996	115,100	+6.9%
2001	124,878	+8.5%
2006	138,596	+11.0%
2011	156,298	+12.8%
2016	170,544	+9.1%
2021	186,593	+9.4%

Population counts are not adjusted for boundary changes.
Source: Statistics Canada

Neighbourhood	Population (2021)	Population (2016)	Population (2011)	Population (2006)	Area (km^{2})	Density (per km^{2})	Census Tracts
Agriculture Canada	10	5	5	0	16.96	0.6	5050140.01
Barrhaven West	15,940	16,387	17,253	17,887	4.43	3598.2	5050140.05, 5050140.04, 5050140.07, 5050140.06
Bayshore-Fairfield Heights	7,705	7,492	7,640	7,535	1.21	6367.8	5050138.00
Bells Corners	9,385	9,272	9,468	9,799	4.67	2009.6	5050136.02, 5050136.01
Briargreen	2,056	1,913	2,043	2,097	0.90	2284.4	5050137.04
Centrepointe	6,966	7,245	7,523	7,275	2.06	3381.6	5050137.05
Chapman Mills-Heart's Desire-Jockvale-Barrhaven Mews	16,199	13,357	9,048	2,997	6.38	2539.0	5050141.13, 5050141.20, 5050141.21, 5050141.22
City View-Ryan Farm	5,784	5,092	4,913	4,756	2.42	2390.1	5050133.00
Craig Henry	6,931	6,508	6,593	6,772	1.84	3766.8	5050135.01
Crestview-Meadowlands	3,810	3,664	3,671	3,608	2.05	1858.5	5050134.00
Crystal Beach	3,941	3,962	3,924	4,173	5.51	715.2	5050139.00
Davidson Heights-Rideau Glen-Ashdale	8,242	8,375	8,632	8,391	8.38	983.5	5050141.09, 5050141.18
Fisher Heights-Skyline	6,451	6,086	6,092	6,004	1.96	3291.3	5050132.00
Half Moon Bay	15,219	8,156	3,212	32	6.53	2331.7	5050141.24, 5050141.25
Havenlea-Winding Way	6,369	6,423	6,237	4,899	1.69	3768.6	5050141.09
Knollsbrook	2,609	2,613	2,667	2,745	0.81	3221.0	5050140.03
Leslie Park	3,056	3,096	3,134	2,833	0.98	3118.4	5050137.02
Longfields	21,504	19,763	17,242	15,278	4.61	4664.6	5050141.11, 5050141.10, 5050141.16, 5050141.17
Manordale	1,827	1,860	1,947	1,899	1.41	1295.7	5050135.03
Parkwood Hills-Borden Farm-Stewart Farm-Fisher Glen	11,100	10,161	10,050	10,189	2.86	3881.1	5050131.01, 5050131.02
Pineglen-Country Place- Merivale Gardens-Grenfell Glen-CitiPlace	4,172	3,950	3,893	3,385	11.07	376.9	5050130.01
Qualicum-Graham Park	1,784	1,772	1,715	1,699	1.21	1474.4	5050137.03
Stonebridge	9,371	8,665	6,274	2,821	5.24	1787.3	5050141.04, 5050141.26
Strandherd Meadows	4,781	3,495	1,759	25	4.84	987.0	5050141.23
Tanglewood	4,492	4,247	4,385	4,401	1.60	2807.5	5050130.02
Trend-Arlington	4,695	4,771	4,818	4,945	3.55	1322.5	5050135.02
Rural Nepean (Fallowfield, Orchard Estates, Cedarhill Estates, Twin Elm)	2,194	2,214	2,160	2,244	123.02	17.8	5050141.14

== Economy ==
Although the neighbouring municipality of Kanata formed the entrepreneurial and high tech centre of the region, Nepean hosted noted industries such as Nortel Networks, JDS Uniphase, and Gandalf Technologies. As with the rest of the National Capital Region, however, Nepean's economy was also heavily dependent on federal government employment. Most of Nepean's employed residents commute to downtown Ottawa or Kanata for work.

Running north-south, Merivale Road is the retail centre of Nepean, offering many smaller shops as well as big box stores. Colonnade Road Business Park is to the west of Merivale Road and south of Borden Farm, supporting many businesses along its two branches, including some federal offices such as the Public Health Agency of Canada and Canadian Corps of Commissionaires, and an OC Transpo bus depot. The boulevard of Hunt Club West hosts a large auto mall, big box stores, PetSmart, and Costco's Canadian headquarters, as well as a retail location. Further south is the Bentley Avenue industrial park where many independent auto shops are located, and a precast concrete factory. Several petroleum companies have fuel storage facilities in the area.

== Places of interest ==
Ben Franklin Place, located in Centrepointe, was the city hall for Nepean until it became a part of Ottawa. Now, it serves as a government office and client service centre, as well as continuing to be home to a branch of the Ottawa Public Library and the Centrepointe Theatre.

Nepean Museum located at 16 Rowley Avenue, Nepean Ontario is a museum that collects, preserves, researches, exhibits and interprets the works of man and nature in Nepean.

== Education ==
Anglophone schools in Nepean are administered by the Ottawa-Carleton District School Board (OCDSB) and the Ottawa-Carleton Catholic School Board (OCCSB). Both the OCDSB and OCCSB headquarters are located within Nepean itself.

Francophone education is provided by the Conseil des écoles publiques de l'Est de l'Ontario (CÉPEO) and the Conseil des écoles catholiques du Centre-Est (CECCE).

Schools in Nepean include:

=== Public schools ===
==== Elementary ====
- Adrienne Clarkson Elementary School
- Barrhaven Public School
- Bayshore Public School
- Bells Corners Public School
- Berrigan Elementary School
- Briargreen Public School
- Chapman Mills Public School
- Farley Mowat Public School
- Jockvale Elementary School
- Knoxdale Public School
- Lakeview Public School
- École élémentaire publique Michaelle-Jean
- Manordale Public School
- Mary Honeywell Elementary School
- Meadowlands Public School
- Sir Winston Churchill Public School

==== Intermediate ====
- Cedarview Middle School

==== Secondary ====
- Bell High School
- John McCrae Secondary School
- Longfields-Davidson Heights Secondary School
- Merivale High School
- École secondaire publique Omer-Deslauriers
- Sir Guy Carleton Secondary School
- Sir Robert Borden High School

==== Special education ====
- Crystal Bay Centre for Special Education

==== Alternate education ====
- Elizabeth Wyn Wood Secondary Alternate Program

==== Closed ====
- Graham Park Public School closed 1988
- J.S. Woodsworth Secondary School closed 2005
- Parkwood Hills Public School closed 2010
- Century Public School closed 2017
- D. Aubrey Moodie Intermediate School closed 2017
- Greenbank Public Middle School closed 2017
- Leslie Park Public School closed 2017

=== Catholic schools ===
==== Elementary ====
- Monsignor Paul Baxter School
- Our Lady of Peace School
- Pope John XXIII School
- St. Andrew School
- St. Elizabeth Ann Seton School
- St. Emily School
- St. Gregory School
- St. John the Apostle School
- St. Luke School, Nepean
- St. Monica School
- St. Patrick School
- St. Rita School
- St. Rose of Lima School

==== Intermediate ====
- Frank Ryan Intermediate School

==== Secondary ====
- École Secondaire Catholique Pierre-Savard
- Collège catholique Franco-Ouest
- St. Mother Teresa High School
- St. Joseph High School
- St. Paul High School

==== Continuing education ====
- St. Patrick's Adult School

==== Post-Secondary ====
- Algonquin College (main campus)

== Media ==
Nepean This Week is a weekly publication distributed in the Nepean area.

The Ottawa area's CTV affiliate, CJOH-DT, was headquartered on Merivale Road in Nepean. The studio was home to shows such as Graham Kerr's The Galloping Gourmet, and the cult children's classic You Can't Do That on Television. The building was ravaged by a fire on February 7, 2010, and was demolished in 2011. The Merivale Road complex is still home to Corus Entertainment's English-language stations CKQB-FM and CJOT-FM.

== Notable people ==
The following famous people were either born in, raised in, or consider Nepean their home town:

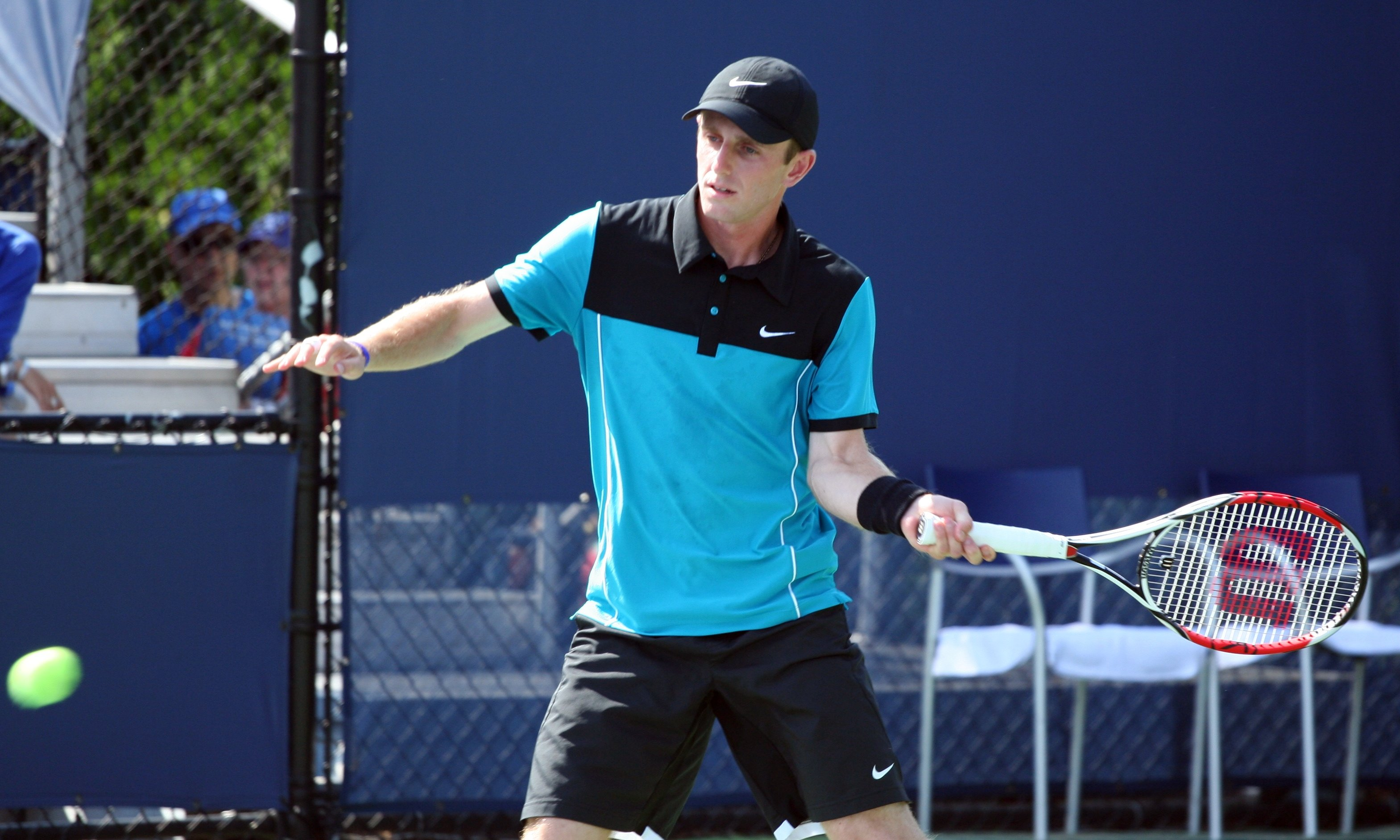
Jesse Levine

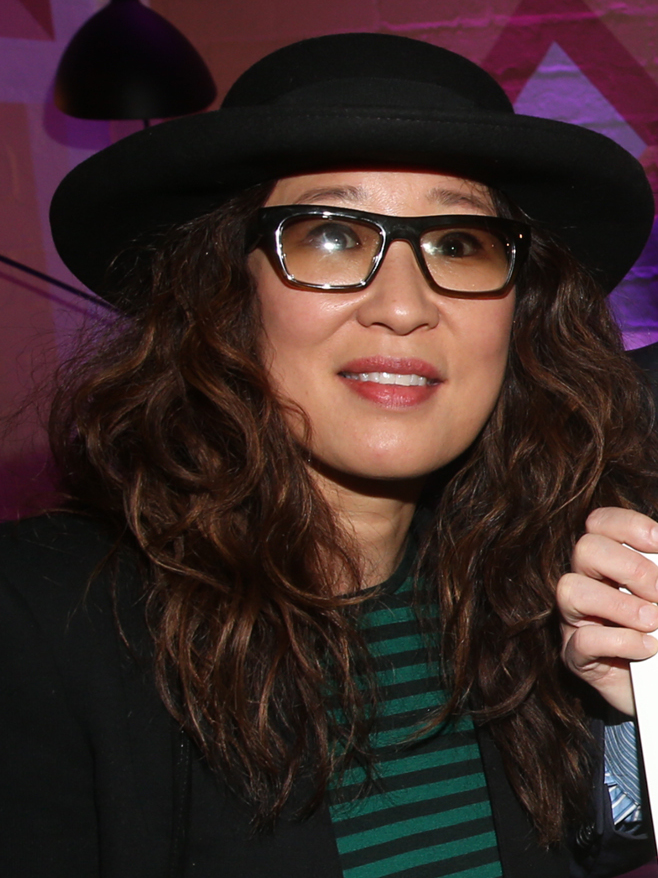
Sandra Oh

- Jamie Baker, hockey player, sports broadcaster
- Fred Brathwaite, hockey player and coach
- Jeff Brown, hockey player and coach
- Andrew Calof, hockey player
- Jeff Chychrun, hockey player
- Doug Frobel, baseball player
- Chester Hansen, musician
- Charmaine Hooper, soccer player
- Howard Jones, musician
- Jesse Levine, tennis player
- Steve MacLean, astronaut
- Sandra Oh, actress
- Jesse Palmer, football player, television personality
- Darren Pang, hockey player, hockey analyst
- Shermar Paul, rapper, songwriter, record producer
- Klea Scott, actress
- MacKenzie Weegar, hockey player
- Jason York, hockey player, broadcaster
- Steve Yzerman, hockey player, current GM of the Detroit Red Wings
- Jeff Zywicki, lacrosse player
