= Tanglewood, Ottawa =

Suburban neighbourhood of Ottawa, Ontario, Canada

Coordinates: 45°20′05″N 75°44′25″W

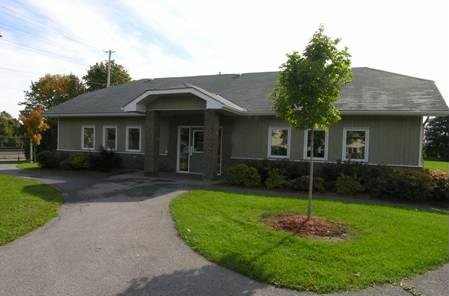
Tanglewood Park Community Centre

Tanglewood, also known as Tanglewood-Hillsdale, is a suburban neighbourhood in Knoxdale-Merivale Ward in the city of Ottawa, Ontario, Canada. It is located within the former City of Nepean in the west end of the city. It is located in the federal and provincial ridings of Nepean-Carleton. It is informally bounded by CN Railway to the north, Merivale Road to the east, Hunt Club Road to the south, and Woodroffe Avenue to the west.

== Homes ==
The Tanglewood sector was built between 1975 and 1986 and the Hillsdale sector was built in the early to mid 1980s. In 2006, Tanglewood-Hillsdale had 1,871 dwellings; 22% of these being single homes, 21% being semi-detached, 45% being townhouses and 12% being an apartments. Seventy 70% owned, while 30% of residents rented their homes.

- Statistics taken from the 2006 Ottawa Neighbourhood Study https://www.neighbourhoodstudy.ca/

== Residents ==
As of the 2006 census, there are 4,894 residents, seventy percent being between 20 and 69. Regarding living arrangements, of the 1370 residents over 55 years old, 275 live alone. Of residents living in families, there are 712 children under the age of 15. Twenty percent are lone parent families. Regarding language, 74% of our residents speak or understand English only, less than 1% reported speaking or understand French only, 24% reported that they speak or understand both English and French, and close to 1% reported that they knew neither English nor French. Among residents who came to Canada post 2000, their continent of origin were: 50% were from Asia or the Middle East, 26% were from Europe, 7.4% were from South or Central America, 7.2% were from Africa, 4.8% were from the Caribbean and 3.3% were from the United States. Regarding income, the average individual income in Tanglewood was $36,187; the average household income was $77,630. Regarding educational achievement, 32% completed a bachelor's degree, 24% completed college or CEGEP, 5.9% completed an apprenticeship or trades certificate, 28% completed at least high school, 11% of residents did not complete high school.

== Schools ==
Many young adults in the community who have completed secondary education attend Algonquin College or Carleton University. Secondary school aged youth attend Merivale High School, or St Pius X High School. Redeemer Christian High School is a local private school. Primary aged children attend Meadowlands (English and Early French immersion) or St. Monica Elementary School. Regarding schools for Francophones: secondary age youth attend Omer-Deslauriers (public) or Collège catholique Franco-Ouest. Primary age children attend either Charlotte-Lemieux (public) or École élémentaire catholique Jean-Robert-Gauthier.

- Schools mentioned here are taken from the websites of the four boards of education.

== Employment ==
In 2006, 73% of Tanglewood residents were in the labour force: 57% worked full-time, 39% worked part-time, and 3.8% did not work in the year before the census. 47% of residents did unpaid work, including housework, or unpaid care to seniors or children. Many staff of local business reside in the neighbourhood. The unemployment rate was 4.7% (Ottawa neighbourhood average: 5.9%), and youth unemployment was 13%. A large percentage of the population is employed by the Federal Government of Canada.

== Transportation ==
The community is served by the OC Transpo route 83 (former 156). Rapid transit is a kilometre away. Intercity rail connections can be made at Fallowfield station to Montreal, Brockville and Toronto. It is 5 kilometres from the community.

Of those who worked, 26% use public transit, 62% drive a car, truck, or van to work, 5% ride in a car, truck, or van as a passenger, 5% walked to work, and 2% bicycled to work.

== Churches ==
The Nepean Baptist Church is located in the community. Living Believers hold services at the Community Center. Churches/Synagogues/Mosques are nearby.

== Businesses ==
There are at least 38 business located in the community. Some are health service providers including a pharmacy. Others are restaurants, convenience stores and a gas bar. A current listing can be found on the Association's website.

== Parks ==
There are two parks in the community, both dog leash parks. Tanglewood Park has two play structures, a tennis court, a ball diamond, a basketball court/ball hockey courts. Hillsdale Park has play structures, basketball/walk and hoops, two ball diamonds, an outdoor volleyball court and a soccer field. A toboggan hill is also found in the south side of the Community.

== Community Association ==
The Tanglewood Hillsdale Community Association was incorporated in August 1988 to represent and advance the interests of neighbourhood residents. The Association on behalf of the City of Ottawa manages the Tanglewood Park Community Centre, and its outdoor rinks and basketball and road hockey courts. It is situated close to the Howard Darwin Centennial Arena. The Association is a member of the Knoxdale-Merivale Council of Community Associations and the Federation of Citizens Associations of Ottawa and its predecessor the Nepean Federation of Community Associations. It has been particularly active during periods when major developments or issues surface in the community, such as the Hunt Club extension, Costco and Crossroads commercial developments. The Community Association participates with the City police in providing Neighbourhood Watch. Households and businesses are encouraged to be members of the association. The Association partners with the Nepean Rideau and Osgoode Community Resource Centre in the provision of services in the neighbourhood.
