= 2018 United States–Canada tornado outbreak =

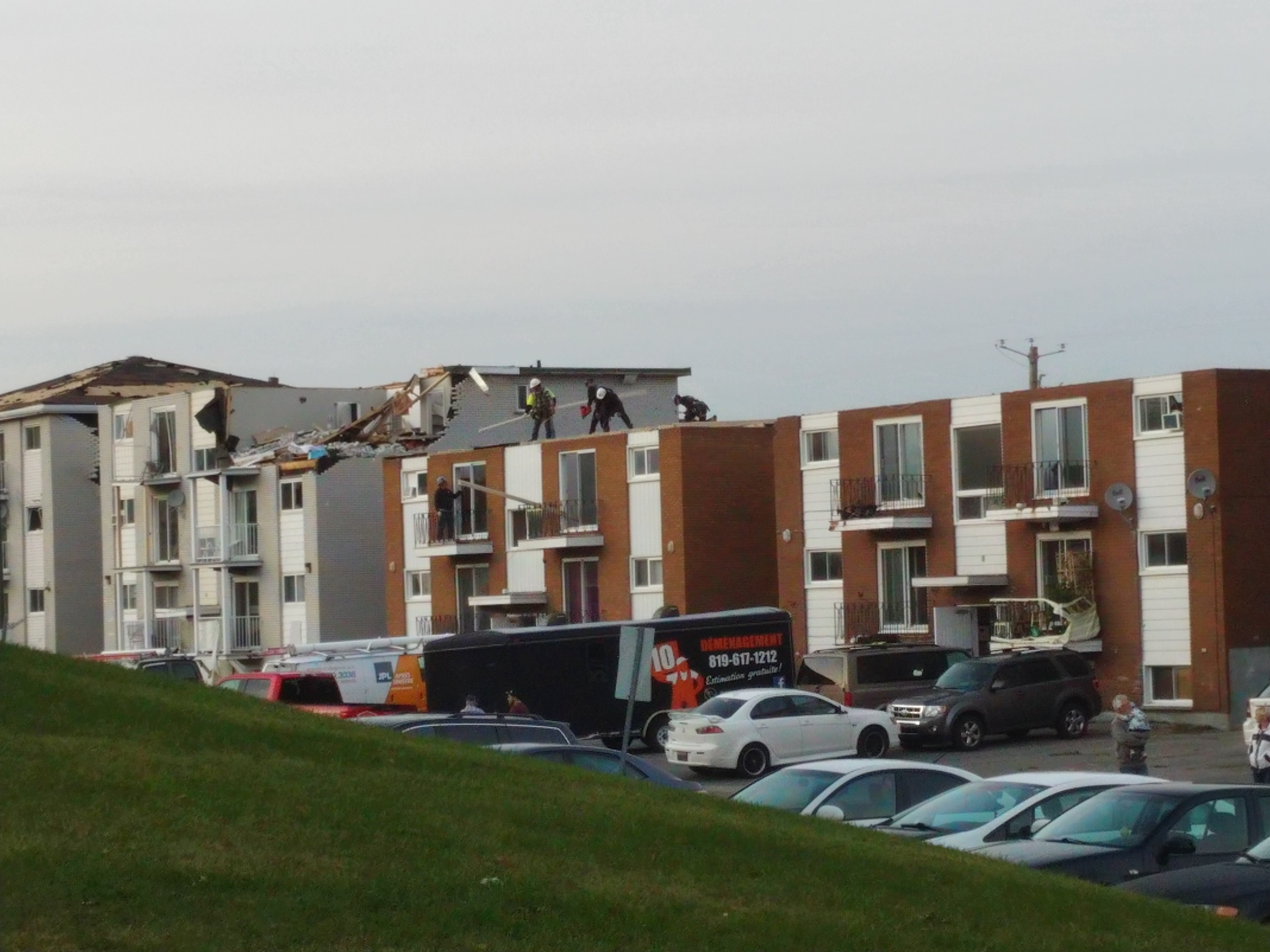
- Major damage to apartment buildings in Gatineau, Quebec, as a result of an EF3 tornado

Meteorological history
- Formed: September 20, 2018; EDT
- Dissipated: September 21, 2018

Tornado outbreak
- Tornadoes: 38
- Max. rating: EF3 tornado
- Highest winds: 245 km/h (150 mph)

Overall effects
- Fatalities: 1 (non-tornadic)
- Injuries: 31
- Damage: $295 million ($378 million in 2025)
- Areas affected: Ohio, Iowa, Minnesota, Wisconsin, Ontario, and Quebec
- Power outages: 300,000
- Part of the tornado outbreaks of 2018

A destructive, two-day tornado outbreak affected the Great Lakes region of the United States and the National Capital Region of Canada in late-September. A total of 38 tornadoes were confirmed, including an intense, long-tracked EF3 tornado that moved along an 80 km (50 mi) path from near Dunrobin, Ontario to Gatineau, Quebec, and an EF2 tornado in the Nepean sector of Ottawa. The tornadoes in Ottawa-Gatineau were declared one of the ten most significant weather events of 2018 in Canada by the Meteorological Service of Canada.

Numerous tornadoes touched down in Minnesota on the initial day of the outbreak, including a high-end EF2 tornado that caused major damage in Morristown, Minnesota. Other damage occurred in Eastern Ontario due to downburst winds from the severe thunderstorms. One death was reported as a result of straight-line winds that occurred during the outbreak, and 31 people were injured.

== Meteorological synopsis ==
In the Great Lakes region of the United States, a warm front surged in a hot, unstable air mass ahead of a strong cold front on September 20. An enhanced risk of severe weather was issued by the Storm Prediction Center (SPC), including a 10% hatched risk area for tornadoes stretching from southern Minnesota into Wisconsin. Later that evening, a quasi-linear convective system with numerous embedded circulations and bowing line segments produced many tornadoes across southern Minnesota. This included a high-end EF2 tornado that heavily damaged or destroyed many homes in the town of Morristown, Minnesota. Another EF2 tornado damaged the local airport in Faribault. A few tornadoes were also confirmed in Iowa, Wisconsin, and Ohio, and damaging winds from the line of storms also caused significant damage. Embedded downbursts produced destructive straight-line winds of up to 100 mph (160 km/h) during the event. With 25 tornadoes in a matter of hours, this event was Minnesota's third most prolific tornado day on record.

The severe weather threat was expected to move eastward to affect southern Ontario and a part of southwestern Quebec the next day. On September 21, a significant severe weather threat was confirmed across southern Ontario and the Outaouais region of Quebec, with the potential for severe thunderstorms and tornadoes noted.

Severe thunderstorm watches and warnings along with wind warnings and special weather statements were issued across parts of Ontario as early as the pre-dawn hours of September 21, which remained in effect until that evening. The warm humid air mass reached Ontario that morning of September 21, along with localized thunderstorms with heavy torrential downpours in most of the areas across southern Ontario and again later that day during the tornado outbreak. Record breaking temperatures across southern Ontario ranged from the high 20s into the low 30s. Tornado watches and warnings were issued by that afternoon.

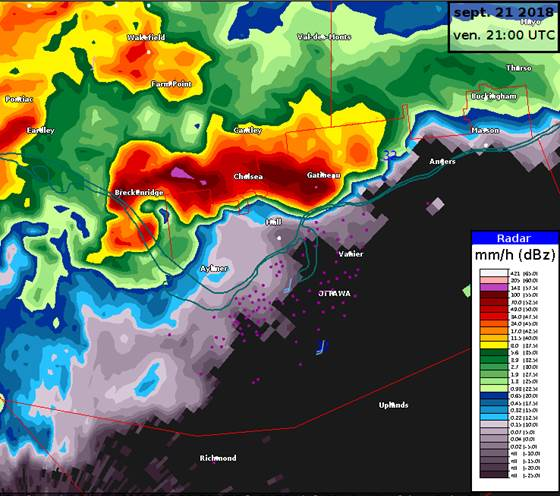
Radar imagery at 2100 UTC (5 pm local) of a tornadic supercell thunderstorm approaching Gatineau, Quebec on September 21. Note the clearly visible hook echo.

On the afternoon of September 21, 2018, a localized outbreak of tornadoes impacted eastern Ontario and southern Quebec. During the event, Environment Canada issued numerous tornado warnings as multiple discrete tornadic supercells moved through the area. Between 3:30 p.m. and 6:30 p.m. EDT, seven tornadoes, six of which were strong, caused severe damage in and around the National Capital Region of Canada.

The most significant tornado of the event made a direct strike on the small community of Dunrobin in the west end of Ottawa, then crossed the Ottawa River and struck the southern part of Luskville, the northern part of the Aylmer sector, and the Mont-Bleu residential area in the Hull sector before dissipating near the Pointe-Gatineau neighborhood of the Gatineau sector. The Dunrobin-Gatineau tornado was classified as a mid-range, long-tracked EF3 tornado, with peak winds reaching 245 km/h (150 mph). Approximately 25 people were injured by the EF3 tornado, six of those taken to the hospital and five people had life-threatening injuries. At least 200 buildings were damaged and an unknown number were destroyed along the path. During the event, the long-tracked EF3 tornado that struck Dunrobin and Gatineau was visible on the horizon behind the Parliament Hill buildings in Ottawa. A still image of the funnel was also captured from a live webcam.

A second damaging tornado, rated EF2, caused significant damage in the Arlington Woods, Craig Henry, and Merivale Road residential areas of Nepean, with peak winds of 220 km/h (135 mph) The tornadoes were preceded by severe thunderstorms throughout Ontario and Quebec. Five other tornadoes also caused minor to moderate damage in the region, though they remained over remote forested areas and mostly damaged trees and power lines.

The severe weather threat then diminished by late Friday evening, with cool windy conditions.

== Confirmed tornadoes ==
Confirmed tornadoes by Enhanced Fujita rating
EFU	EF0	EF1	EF2	EF3	EF4	EF5	Total
0	10	20	7	1	0	0	38

=== September 20 event ===
List of confirmed tornadoes in the United States – Thursday, September 20, 2018 (Note: All dates are based on the local time zone where the tornado touched down; however, all times are in Coordinated Universal Time for consistency.)
EF#	Location	County / Parish	State	Start Coord.	Time (UTC)	Path length	Max width
EF1	NE of Middlefield	Geauga	OH	41.5017°N 81.068°W	18:23–18:31	3.18 mi (5.12 km)	25 yd (23 m)
EF1	A building under construction suffered significant damage and tree limbs were snapped. Outbuildings and a house sustained minor damage as well.						
EF1	NE of Middlefield	Geauga, Trumbull	OH	41.4814°N 81.0206°W	18:31–18:41	4.11 mi (6.61 km)	25 yd (23 m)
EF1	Two single-wide mobile homes were significantly damaged. Otherwise, damage was confined to trees.						
EF1	Superior	Dickinson, Emmet	IA	43.4238°N 94.9899°W	22:21–22:28	5.07 mi (8.16 km)	35 yd (32 m)
EF1	Trees were damaged in town, and a garage was destroyed. A two-story office building at the Superior Ethanol plant sustained major roof damage, broken windows, and partial exterior wall failure on the second floor. A weather station at the plant measured a 99 mph (159 km/h) wind gust. Crops were damaged as well.						
EF1	Northern Granada to S of Huntley	Martin, Faribault	MN	43.698°N 94.353°W	22:52–22:59	6.48 mi (10.43 km)	220 yd (200 m)
EF1	This tornado touched down in Granada, where a house had its roof blown off, a small and unanchored home was shifted off its foundation and leveled, trees were downed, garages were destroyed, and other homes sustained roof damage. East of town, trees were snapped and sheet metal was strewn through fields.						
EF0	Garden City	Blue Earth	MN	44.0432°N 94.1665°W	22:58–23:00	1.15 mi (1.85 km)	70 yd (64 m)
EF0	A weak tornado struck Garden City, downing trees at the fairgrounds. Outside of town, soybean fields were damaged and additional trees were downed.						
EF0	SW of Skyline	Blue Earth	MN	44.1155°N 94.0785°W	23:04–23:05	0.84 mi (1.35 km)	70 yd (64 m)
EF0	A weak tornado caused minor tree damage. A house sustained roof damage from a falling tree.						
EF1	Lake Elysian	Waseca	MN	44.1401°N 93.7612°W	23:19–23:25	7.13 mi (11.47 km)	440 yd (400 m)
EF1	A house sustained roof loss and total destruction of its garage. The home owner was thrown from the garage into his yard, and sustained minor injuries. Outbuildings were damaged, a grain bin was thrown into a field. Other homes sustained minor damage, and trees were damaged as well.						
EF0	E of Janesville	Waseca	MN	44.1186°N 93.6027°W	23:20–23:21	0.73 mi (1.17 km)	20 yd (18 m)
EF0	High-resolution satellite imagery confirmed a brief tornado through corn fields.						
EF1	SSW of Waseca	Waseca	MN	43.9926°N 93.6634°W	23:20–23:30	10.88 mi (17.51 km)	300 yd (270 m)
EF1	A tornado damaged trees and a silo along its path.						
EF1	SE of Elysian to NE of Waterville	Waseca, Le Sueur	MN	44.1816°N 93.6305°W	23:25–23:32	7.17 mi (11.54 km)	330 yd (300 m)
EF1	This tornado struck Waterville, where numerous trees were downed, many of which landed on homes. A one-story home had a large section of its roof torn off as well. Outside of town, tree limbs were snapped.						
EF1	Eastern Waseca to SW of Medford	Waseca, Steele	MN	44.0797°N 93.4774°W	23:28–23:37	11.13 mi (17.91 km)	350 yd (320 m)
EF1	A silo and a grain bin were both destroyed. A few sheds and outbuildings, as well as many trees and crops, were damaged.						
EF2	Southeastern Morristown	Rice	MN	44.2098°N 93.4504°W	23:31–23:36	4.94 mi (7.95 km)	300 yd (270 m)
EF2	This strong tornado touched down in the southeastern part of Morristown, and caused high-end EF2 damage as it impacted residential areas. Many trees were snapped and numerous homes were badly damaged, some of which lost roofs and exterior walls. One home was left with only a few walls standing. The tornado continued to the northeast outside of town, where a turkey barn and outbuildings were destroyed. Crops were damaged as well.						
EF1	N of Morristown to NE of Roberds Lake	Rice	MN	44.2527°N 93.438°W	23:35–23:44	8.57 mi (13.79 km)	440 yd (400 m)
EF1	Many outbuildings were destroyed, and numerous trees were snapped or uprooted along the path. A shed was crushed by a large tree.						
EF1	Owatonna	Steele	MN	44.0595°N 93.332°W	23:35–23:42	8.12 mi (13.07 km)	300 yd (270 m)
EF1	Southwest of town, crops and trees were damaged and a barn was destroyed. In Owatonna, power poles and power lines were snapped, a large factory building sustained minor exterior damage, homes had shingles ripped off, and many trees were snapped or uprooted, some of which landed on homes.						
EF2	Northwestern Faribault	Rice	MN	44.3036°N 93.3448°W	23:37–23:40	2.95 mi (4.75 km)	600 yd (550 m)
EF2	Significant damage occurred at the Faribault Airport, where several hangars were destroyed and roughly 80 airplanes were damaged or destroyed. The footings of one hangar were ripped from its frame. Hundreds of trees were downed, and outbuildings were damaged as well.						
EF1	Roberds Lake	Rice	MN	44.3336°N 93.3628°W	23:40–23:42	1.57 mi (2.53 km)	150 yd (140 m)
EF1	Numerous trees were snapped or uprooted, some of which landed on homes and cabins. Outbuildings were destroyed, and one home sustained broken windows and considerable roof damage.						
EF1	N of Medford to E of Faribault	Rice	MN	44.1965°N 93.2379°W	23:40–23:47	9.06 mi (14.58 km)	500 yd (460 m)
EF1	Outbuildings, grain bins, machine sheds, and silos were damaged or destroyed along the path. Homes had portions of their roofs torn off, and many trees were snapped or uprooted.						
EF1	S of Nerstrand	Rice, Goodhue	MN	44.2466°N 93.1307°W	23:44–23:50	7.17 mi (11.54 km)	300 yd (270 m)
EF1	A few sheds and outbuildings, as well as numerous corn and soy bean fields, were damaged. A silo lost a roof panel.						
EF1	N of Faribault	Rice	MN	44.351°N 93.2657°W	23:44–23:48	4.66 mi (7.50 km)	440 yd (400 m)
EF1	Numerous large trees were damaged along the path.						
EF1	S of Dundas	Rice	MN	44.3649°N 93.3035°W	23:45–23:50	5.75 mi (9.25 km)	440 yd (400 m)
EF1	This tornado damaged power poles and trees, twisted road signs, and left a convergent pattern in a corn field.						
EF0	Dundas	Rice	MN	44.4013°N 93.293°W	23:46–23:51	5.53 mi (8.90 km)	75 yd (69 m)
EF0	Pine trees were uprooted and billboards were destroyed to the southwest of town. In Dundas, numerous trees were snapped or uprooted.						
EF1	SE of Northfield	Rice, Goodhue	MN	44.4149°N 93.1268°W	23:52–23:57	5.31 mi (8.55 km)	550 yd (500 m)
EF1	A pizza restaurant housed in a large barn was leveled by this high-end EF1 tornado. Other outbuildings were damaged or destroyed, and trees were damaged.						
EF0	S of Wanamingo	Goodhue	MN	44.2672°N 92.9006°W	23:56–00:05	8.72 mi (14.03 km)	250 yd (230 m)
EF0	Corn crop was damaged, and tree limbs were snapped, some of which pierced the roof of a machine shed.						
EF1	Southern Cannon Falls	Goodhue	MN	44.4771°N 92.9206°W	00:01–00:03	1.86 mi (2.99 km)	440 yd (400 m)
EF1	Numerous trees were snapped or uprooted, with many falling on homes and vehicles.						
EF0	N of Cannon Falls	Dakota, Goodhue	MN	44.5419°N 92.9688°W	00:02–00:05	3.19 mi (5.13 km)	70 yd (64 m)
EF0	Roofing material was removed from a commercial facility, and a convergent pattern was noted in crops.						
EF0	S of New Trier	Dakota	MN	44.5829°N 92.975°W	00:04–00:08	4.61 mi (7.42 km)	220 yd (200 m)
EF0	Outbuildings were damaged at several farms.						
EF0	NE of Zumbrota	Goodhue, Wabasha	MN	44.3353°N 92.6512°W	00:09–00:14	6.22 mi (10.01 km)	150 yd (140 m)
EF0	This tornado struck several farms, destroying grain bins and outbuildings.						
EF0	Prairie Island	Goodhue, Pierce	MN, WI	44.6382°N 92.6787°W	00:16–00:19	3.23 mi (5.20 km)	100 yd (91 m)
EF0	This brief, weak tornado caused minor damage.						
EF0	E of Ellsworth	Pierce	WI	44.7318°N 92.4738°W	00:27–00:29	1.67 mi (2.69 km)	140 yd (130 m)
EF0	A barn, sheds, trees and outbuildings were damaged.						

=== September 21 event ===
List of confirmed tornadoes in Canada – Friday, September 21, 2018
EF#	Location	County / Municipality	Province	Start Coord.	Time (UTC)	Path length	Max width
EF2	E of Mont-Laurier	La Vallée-de-la-Gatineau	QC	46.6522°N 75.9608°W	19:30	19.4 km (12.1 mi)	1,200 m (1,300 yd)
EF2	This tornado tracked through densely forested areas near the Baskatong Reservoir, snapping trees and damaging power lines.						
EF2	N of Otter Lake	Pontiac	QC	45.9103°N 76.4848°W	19:50	12.6 km (7.8 mi)	320 m (350 yd)
EF2	A tornado tracked through densely forested areas, downing numerous trees along its path.						
EF2	Calabogie to White Lake	Renfrew	ON	45.2736°N 76.9244°W	19:50	37.6 km (23.4 mi)	1,210 m (1,320 yd)
EF2	This tornado touched down in Calabogie, snapping and uprooting many trees, causing roof damage to homes, and destroying a garage. One person was injured.						
EF3	W of Kinburn to Gatineau	Ottawa, Gatineau	ON, QC	45.3702°N 76.2969°W	20:30	48.8 km (30.3 mi)	1,450 m (1,590 yd)
EF3	This destructive tornado touched down in Ontario near Kinburn, heavily damaging multiple homes, destroying barns and outbuildings, and mangling farm machinery. The tornado then struck Dunrobin at mid-range EF3 strength, damaging or destroying numerous homes, a couple of which were leveled or swept from their foundations. Vehicles were thrown and destroyed, debris was scattered through fields, and a shopping plaza was severely damaged. The tornado maintained EF3 strength as it crossed into Quebec and moved through densely populated areas of Gatineau. Many apartment buildings sustained major structural damage in this area, many of which had their roofs torn off, with some sustaining collapse of their top floor exterior walls. Trees were snapped and debarked, several car dealerships were damaged, power poles were snapped, and cars were tossed and damaged as well. At least 200 buildings were damaged or destroyed, and 25 people were injured, five critically.						
EF2	SE of Val-des-Bois	Papineau	QC	45.8665°N 75.8325°W	20:40	27.1 km (16.8 mi)	910 m (1,000 yd)
EF2	Many trees were snapped and several buildings were damaged along the path. Homes sustained roof damage, and boats and docks were damaged as well.						
EF1	SSE of Sharbot Lake	Frontenac	ON	44.7287°N 76.7248°W	21:40	21.8 km (13.5 mi)	600 m (660 yd)
EF1	A tornado touched down and caused mainly tree damage near Sharbot Lake and to the north of St. George Lake. This event was initially classified as a downburst, until further analysis determined that it was a tornado.						
EF2	Nepean	Ottawa	ON	45.3031°N 75.8537°W	21:50	21.4 km (13.3 mi)	750 m (820 yd)
EF2	A rain-wrapped, high-end EF2 tornado touched down in western Nepean and struck the Arlington Woods and Craig Henry neighbourhoods, where many homes and apartment buildings were damaged. Some homes sustained roof loss, and a few sustained partial exterior wall failure as well. A church had much of its roof ripped off, and numerous large trees were snapped or uprooted, many of which landed on homes and vehicles. A metal truss tower was toppled over and mangled as well. Further east, a power substation was severely damaged, businesses had their roofs blown off, power poles were snapped, and a box truck was overturned. The Colonnade Road Business Park also sustained considerable damage. Additional trees and tree limbs were downed in the Greenboro neighbourhood before the tornado dissipated.						
EF1	SSE of Lac-Sac	Baie-des-Chaloupes	QC	46.4534°N 74.5822°W	22:00	6.46 km (4.01 mi)	840 m (920 yd)
EF1	High-resolution satellite imagery depicted tree damage through a forested area consistent with a tornado.						

== Aftermath ==
Damage from the tornadoes caused more than 272,000 customers of the National Capital Region to lose power, with some of the outages lasting for days. In addition to the tornadoes, microbursts and hail from the severe thunderstorms also caused considerable damage across Ontario and Quebec.

Most of the severely damaged buildings that remained intact after the tornado were under repair. The Dunrobin Plaza shopping centre, which was severely damaged by the tornado, was demolished in December 2018, more than two months after the tornado. In October 2018, a month after the storm, it was announced that the September 21 tornadoes caused a massive $295 million in insurance costs, making it one of 2018's costliest storms in Ontario.

The Dunrobin-Gatineau EF3 tornado was the strongest to hit eastern Ontario since 1902. The last time an EF3 tornado occurred in Ontario prior to this event was the Goderich tornado in August 2011. One non-tornadic death occurred as a result of this severe weather outbreak. The fatality was reported in the township of Rideau Lakes, Ontario, after a man was struck by a falling tree after being caught in straight-line winds.

=== The National Capital Region power outages ===
One of the sites that was affected by the Arlington Woods EF2 tornado was the Merivale electrical substation, one of the two major stations in the city, located near the intersection of Merivale and Hunt Club Road in western Ottawa. While there is no proof confirming whether or not the tornado directly struck the station, it did rip off the roof of two nearby buildings, slamming into the infrastructure, insulators, and wires. Furthermore, the effects of the storm snapped approximately 80 to 90 Hydro poles in the area, downing many others, and leaving pole and wires dangling.

This was the main reason for the longest power outages in the Ottawa-Gatineau region, affecting more than 300,000 customers of the 331,777 total customers who use Hydro Ottawa, plus those served on the Quebec side by Hydro-Québec. Rebuilding the power plant was especially difficult, which took Hydro One and Hydro Ottawa two days working to repair enough of the damage to restore power. Finally, on the evening of September 22, power was restored in some neighbourhoods in southwestern Ottawa. Repair of the downed poles was done as fast as possible, as to restore heat and power as well in several residences.

Although electricity had been restored, the power plant had still required additional repairs, and Hydro One continued working on critical repairs to the station in order to return it to its full potential state. Planned power outages around the city affected more than 50,000 Hydro One and Hydro Ottawa customers to replace important elements. Work at the Merivale station was expected to last for several months.

The Ottawa Macdonald–Cartier International Airport was forced to use backup power during the storms. No damage was reported at the airport.

== See also ==
- List of tornadoes and tornado outbreaks
  - List of North American tornadoes and tornado outbreaks
  - List of 21st-century Canadian tornadoes and tornado outbreaks
- 1953 Sarnia tornado outbreak
- 1985 United States–Canada tornado outbreak
  - List of tornadoes in the 1985 United States–Canada tornado outbreak
- 1997 Southeast Michigan tornado outbreak
