= Country Place =

Neighbourhood in Ottawa, Canada

Coordinates: 45°19′15″N 75°42′30″W

Country Place is a residential neighbourhood near the geographical centre of Ottawa, Canada, in Knoxdale-Merivale Ward. Prior to 2001, it was part of the former city of Nepean. It is a mature residential subdivision with about 400 houses located just inside the Ottawa greenbelt near the Rideau River, and about 11 km from downtown Ottawa. It is bordered by the Black Rapids Creek and the greenbelt to the south, Prince of Wales Drive to the east, Merivale Road to the west, and the Pineglen community to the north. Amberwood Crescent meanders through the community, exiting onto Prince of Wales and Merivale. Tennyson Drive links Country Place to Pineglen.

Houses in Country Place were built mostly in the early 1970s, and are similar in size and design. The only exceptions are houses on Campfield Ct. which was built in the 1980s on land that had originally been set aside for a possible school.

The community has an active community association that runs events several times a year, maintains an outdoor rink in the winter, and helps promote the interests of the residents. Country Place is within the Knoxdale-Merivale Ward of the City of Ottawa.

== Transportation ==
Overall, transit access to the community is limited due to its low densities. The community is served by OC Transpo route 187 which supplies morning and evening rush hour connections to Baseline Station. Route 80 runs down Merivale Road at the edge of the community, connecting the community to Barrhaven and central Ottawa. Route 199 also runs on Merivale Road and serves people arriving from the east in the morning, and heading to the RCMP headquarters in Barrhaven. Limited service is also available on a branch of Route 96 on the northern edge of the community and links the community to areas east of the Rideau River.

The community is a short drive to the Fallowfield railway station served by Via Rail. This can be reached also on foot or by bicycle using the Greenbelt Pathway.

== Facilities and attractions ==
- Country Place Park – Has play structures, a soccer field, a basketball court and an ice rink in the winter.
- Finger Parks - Several small, mostly forested off leash dog park areas separate sections of the community. There are pathways through these parks, connecting to various courts, to Pineglen and to the Greenbelt Pathway.
- Greenbelt Pathway - This gravel pathway used for walking, cycling and cross-country skiing is part of the Capital Pathway, a large recreational pathway network in Ottawa. It borders Country place to the south, lying in the Blacks Rapids Creek ravine, and is connected to Country Place at several places. To the west, the pathway continues across Merivale Road, and to the east it connects to Blacks Rapids. The pathway meanders through wooded land and passes next to farm fields.
- Blacks Rapids locks on the Rideau Canal and Victory Hill - This public recreational area is a short walk from Country Place, across Prince of Wales Drive.

There are no schools or churches within the boundaries of Country Place, although St. Monica's Church is just across Merivale Road. The closest School is St. Monica's School, which is within walking distance and is part of the Ottawa Catholic School Board. Other schools attended by children of Country Place include Meadowlands Public School, Sir Winston Churchill Public School, Merivale High School and St Pius X High School.

== Business ==
On Merivale Road there is a small plaza containing several businesses.

The community is 1.5 km south of the Nepean South Business Park, which contains a major oil terminal, and numerous other industrial enterprises. It is 3 km south of the Nepean Crossroads retail area where there are many big box stores, including Costco, Canadian Tire and Rona. Additional large retail establishments lie further to the north.

There are no restaurants in the community currently. Within walking distance on Prince of Wales Drive there is a Tim Horton's, and the Restaurant at the Ramada Hotel. There is also a nearby Chinese restaurant on Merivale Road named after the community, and many other restaurants lie to the north along Merivale Road.

The closest full-service grocery store is the Metro, located 4 km north along Merivale Road.

== Development ==
There are plans to widen Prince of Wales to four lanes by about 2020.

== See also ==
- List of neighbourhoods in Ottawa
