= Trend-Arlington =

Neighbourhood in Ottawa, Ontario, Canada

Coordinates: 45.323°N 75.786°W

Trend-Arlington is a suburban neighbourhood in Knoxdale-Merivale Ward in the city of Ottawa, Ontario, Canada. The neighbourhood is located with in the former City of Nepean in the west end of the city. It is located west of Greenbank Road, east of Highway 416 and Cedarview Road, north of West Hunt Club Road and south of the Leslie Park neighbourhood. Its main road is McClellan Road, which is renamed Banner Road at its north end.

The community was developed by the Campeau Corporation from the 1960s to the 1980s.

A swath of the Trend-Arlington neighbourhood was devastated by an EF-2 tornado on September 21, 2018.

== Sub-Neighbourhoods ==
- Arlington Woods
- Trend Village
- Sheehan Estates
- Estates of Arlington Woods

There are four sub-neighbourhoods in Trend-Arlington. Trend Village was the first area to be developed in 1964-1968; Sheehan Estates, the northern tip of the neighbourhood was completed in 1969-1973 and later in 1986; and the Estates of Arlington Woods was developed during 1984 and 1985. The Estates of Arlington Woods is east of Greenbank and west of Knoxdale Road.

== Demographics ==
According to the Canada 2016 Census, the neighbourhood had a total population of 4,771.

== Recreation ==
The neighbourhood is known for recreation. It is home to five parks, bike paths, a shopping plaza, and Bruce Pit, an old quarry which is now a dog park and walking trails in a wooded area. The largest park in the neighbourhood is Trend-Arlington Park which has football and soccer fields, Trend-Arlington Tennis Club and a bike path. In 2007, Ben Franklin Soccer Dome was built. The dome has two giant soccer fields, a workout gym, and a meeting room. The dome also holds charity and community events. Sometimes the Ottawa Senators get their workout training there. There is also a small park located on Banner Road.

It is home to two churches; Arlington Woods Free Methodist Church and a Coptic Orthodox church named St. Mary Coptic Orthodox Church on Greenbank. The community schools are Knoxdale Public School, Greenbank Middle School and Sir Robert Borden High School.
