= Leslie Park =

Suburban neighbourhood in Ottawa, Ontario, Canada

Coordinates: 45°20′10″N 75°47′24″W

Leslie Park is a suburban neighbourhood in College Ward in the city of Ottawa, Ontario, Canada. It is located in the former city of Nepean.

Leslie Park is bounded on the north by Baseline Road, on the east by Greenbank Road and on the south by the OCRR. The Leslie Park Community Association has the fence west of Costello St as the western boundary but some maps extend the western boundary to Graham Creek West. According to the Canada 2016 Census, the population of the neighbourhood (including the Bruce Farm area) was 3,228.

Leslie Park was named after the Leslie Family who originally came to Ottawa from Ireland in 1819, and partially settled in what is now Leslie Park in 1886. The family continued to live on a farm situated on the corner between Monterey Drive and Guthrie Avenue until they sold the farm to developers in the early 1960s.

The neighbourhood was built from 1963-1970s and mid 1980s. Monterey Drive has many stone brick English-style townhouses. By the 1970s more townhouses were built on Costello Avenue and a 17-unit condominium was built at 50 Greenbank. In the 1980s homes on Sandcastle Drive and Valley Stream Drive were built with two high rise condominiums. In the early 2000s more townhouses were built west of Guthrie between Monterey and Baseline Road.

Leslie Park is among the neighbourhoods having the oldest trees over a century old.

Leslie Park contains two parks (Leslie Park, and Brucelands Park). It also contains two schools (Leslie Park Public School (Mamawi Public School) and St. John the Apostle Catholic School).

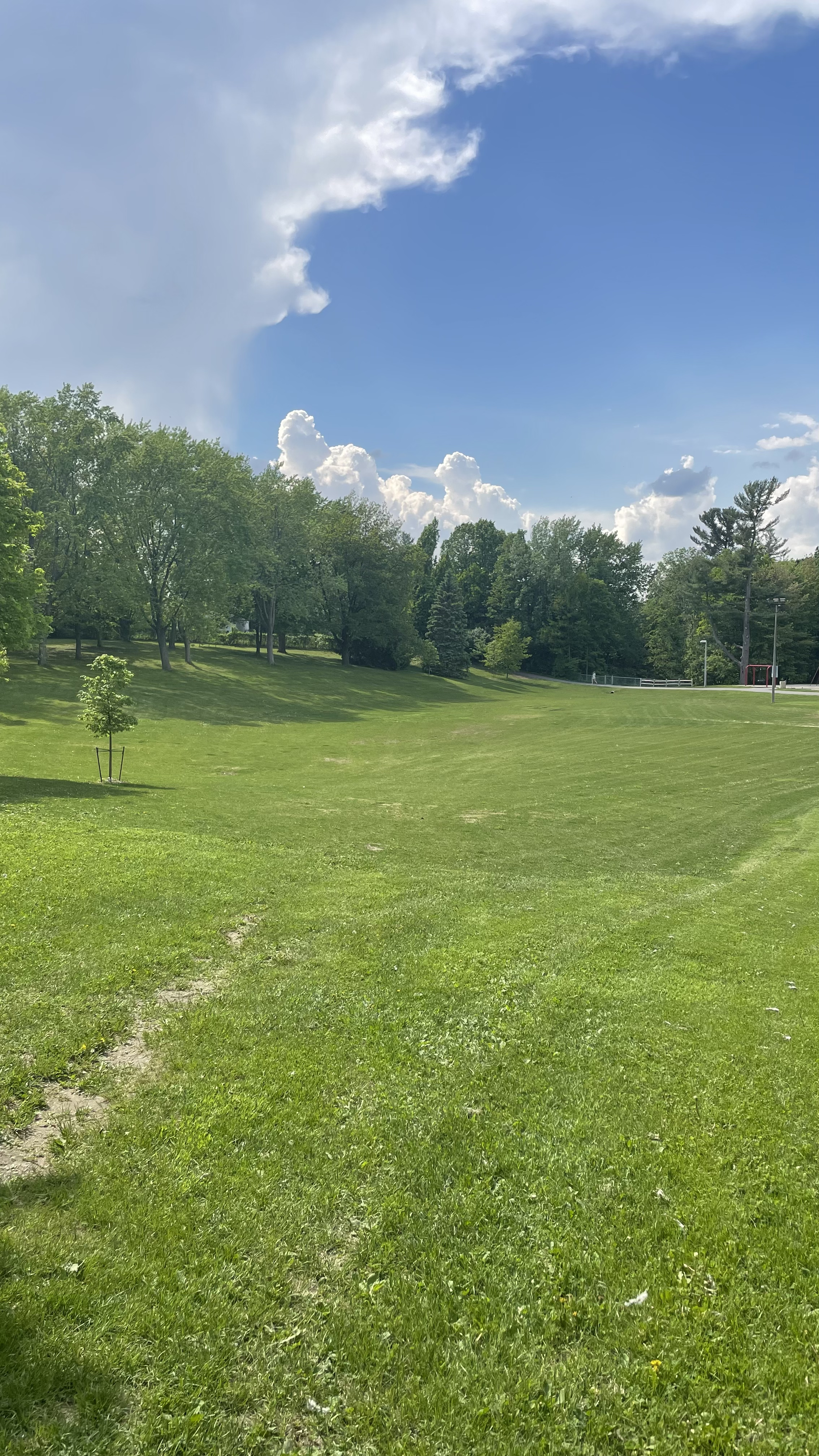
Leslie Park in spring of 2024
