= Ottawa's green spaces along the Rideau River =

The Rideau River physically divides the city of Ottawa into east and west sections, with many green spaces along its banks. Some are controlled by the National Capital Commission (NCC), but most are under the city's Parks department. All of the park have some seating, usually benches and areas for walking. Many have picnic tables. In addition to the park, there are other place where footpaths run along the river banks that are available to the public.

Starting at the northern boundary of the city, the Ottawa River, they are as follows:

== Rideau Falls Park and Green Island ==
This gives an excellent view of the Rideau Falls from lookout areas on Green island and in the park. A building, at present unused, has in the past been a museum, an art gallery and an exhibition hall. A memorial to the Airmen of the Commonwealth is on Green Island. Also in the park are the Mackenzie-Papineau Monument, and the National Artillery Monument. The park has an area of 29,000 sq m.

== Bordeleau Park ==
A small city park, approximately 12,000 sq m, on the West bank.

== New Edinburgh Park ==
A city park on the East bank, of 46,000 sq m area. It has a baseball diamond, benches and picnic tables.

== Porter Island ==
Largely used for bird watching, and is the home of a retirement development

== Besserer Park ==
A very small green space running away from the river, with only a few metres of shoreline. On the West bank with an area of 4000 sq m.

== Riverain Park ==
A park on the East bank just below the Montreal road bridge. It has a large parking area (pay), and there are public tennis courts at the southern end. Its area is 43,000 sq m.

== Strathcona Park ==
Strathcona Park is on the west bank and has an area of 70,000 sq m.

== Dutchy's Hole Park ==
Dutchy's Hole Park is also on the West bank and has an area of 34,000 sq m.

== Robinson Field ==
Robinson Field is rated by the city as a mini-park, but is part of Dutchy's Hole Park.

== Springhurst Park ==
Springhurst Park is on the North-west bank and contains a Baseball diamond, a soccer pitch and a basketball court. Recently a playground has been added. It has an area of 33,000 sq m.

== Brantwood Park ==
On the West bank of the river, Brantwood Park is a sports area, with much of its 43,000 sq m taken with baseball diamonds, a basketball court and two general fields marked as soccer pitches. There is also a wading pool in summer, an oper-air ice rink in winter and a play area.

== Brighton Beach Park ==
A former bathing beach now developed by infill. It is a narrow (20 m wide) strip along he river, encompassing only 9500 sq m.

== Windsor Park ==
Windsor Park Ottawa is a mixed use park. It contains a football pitch and a basketball court, besides the benches and picnic tables found in most other parks. here is a summer wading pool and in winter, an outdoor ice rink, and a play area.

== Brewer Park ==
Brewer Park is one of the larger city parks, having an area of 106,000 sq m.

== Vincent Massey Park ==
On the East side of the river, Vincent Massey Park is a large park (289,000 sq m) controlled by the NCC. The park is crossed by walking and cycling trails, especially in the wooded area near the river. A picnic field has a paid carpark, a snackbar and toilets close by. There is a traditional round bandstand on a hillside suitable for concerts. Vincent Massey Park is connected to Hog's Back Park by a sidewalk in the underpass by the river.

== Hog's Back Park ==
Hog's Back Park is another NCC park with walking paths and picnic areas. The Hog's Back Falls is at South-west corner of the park, and there is a lookout close to the parking for viewing. There is, in the same area, a pavilion holding a snackbar and some tables. Also there are toilets adjacent. In the North of the park there is a hillside used for kite flying. A tunnel connects the park with Mooney's Bay Park. The park covers an area of 208,000 sq m.

== Mooneys Bay Park ==
Mooney's Bay Park is a city park of 293,000 sq m area. It includes the Terry Fox Athletic Facility and the Mooneys Bay Beach. On the other (West) side of the river, which has broaden out to form Mooneys Bay, is the Rideau Canoe Club. This is also listed as an Ottawa park.

== Moffat Farm Veterans Park ==
Moffat Farm Veterans Park should have been much larger than its present size of 30,000 sq m, but development was permitted by the NCC on more than half of the original size away from the river on the West bank.
