= St. Elias Antiochian Orthodox Cathedral =

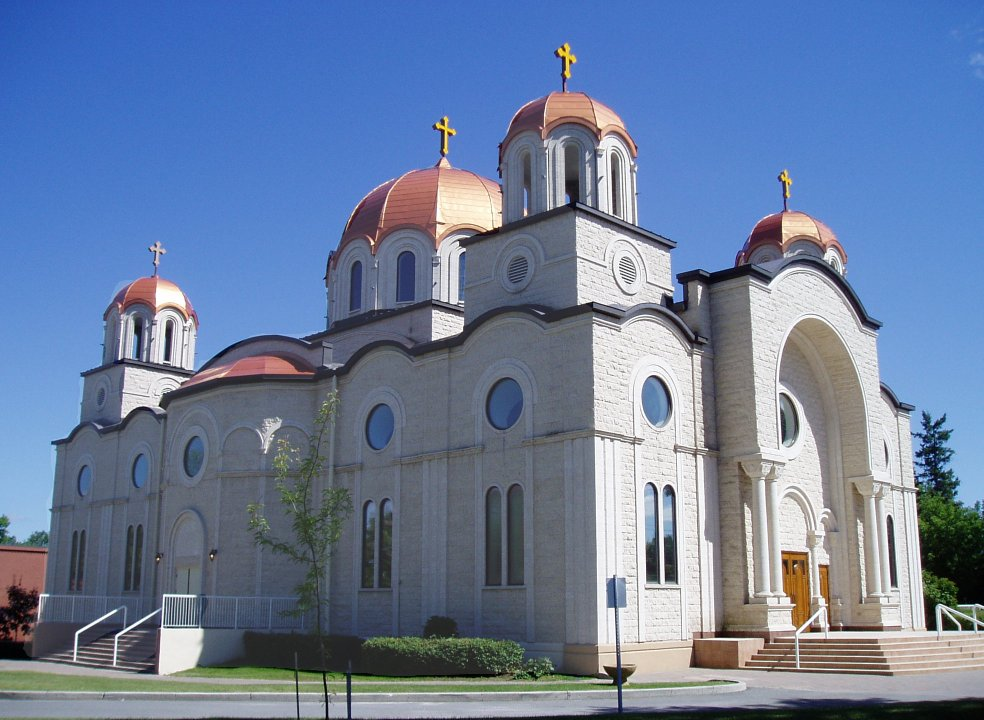
- St. Elias Antiochian Orthodox Cathedral
- St. Elias Antiochian Orthodox Cathedral
- 45.367197°N 75.688612°W
- Location: Ottawa, Ontario
- Country: Canada
- Denomination: Eastern Orthodox
- Churchmanship: Antiochian Eastern-Orthodox

History
- Status: Cathedral

Architecture
- Functional status: Active
- Architectural type: Neo-Byzantine

Clergy
- Pastor: Nektarios Najjar

St. Elias Antiochian Orthodox Cathedral is an Antiochian Eastern-Orthodox cathedral in Ottawa, Ontario, Canada. It is located at 2975 Riverside Drive just east of Mooney's Bay, south of the Hog's Back Falls. The pastor of the cathedral is Fr. Nektarios Najjar.

== History ==
The congregation was founded in 1929 by immigrants from Kfar Mechki, Lebanon. They originally worshiped in a church downtown, that is today St. Elijah's Housing. In part due to the Lebanese Civil War the Antiochian Eastern-Orthodox population of Ottawa increased dramatically in the 1970s and 1980s and the congregation began to look for a larger home. The land was purchased in 1975, and the church was built from 1990 to 1992. In 2000 it was consecrated as a cathedral.

The Diocese of Ottawa today covers Eastern Canada and Upstate New York.

Vesper services is usually held on Saturday evenings. Sunday morning consists of matins at 8:45 AM, followed by the divine liturgy. The annual Ottawa Lebanese Festival is held on the Cathedral Grounds every July and draws Lebanese and non-Lebanese alike from all over Ottawa.

The cathedral has many active groups including the Sunday School, Teen SOYO youth group, Young Adults Ministry, the Fellowship of St. John the Divine, and the Antiochian Women.

== See also ==
- List of cathedrals in Canada
- Greek Orthodox Church of Antioch
