= Minto Bridges =

Series of truss bridges in Ottawa, Ontario

The Minto Bridges are a series of truss bridges that span across the Rideau River, connecting Union Street to Green Island and Maple Island in Ottawa, Ontario, Canada.

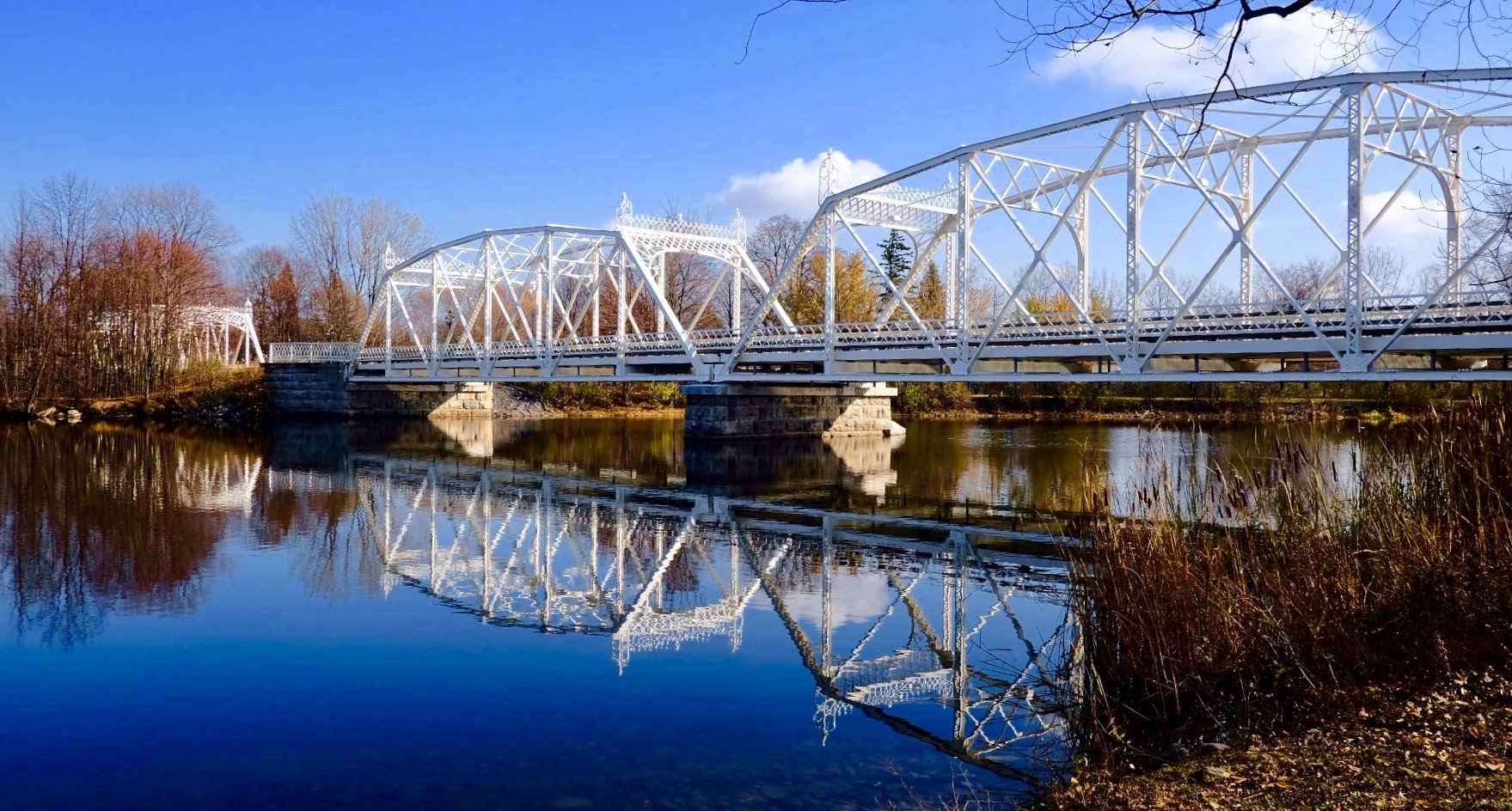
Minto Bridges in Ottawa, Ontario, Canada.

== Connection ==
The Minto Bridges are made up of three spans that are continuously connected, and connect two islands. They span over the Rideau River to connect Union Street to Maple Island and Green Island, the site of the old Ottawa City Hall.

== Appearance ==
The bridges were constructed with riveted connectors, one of the first bridges in Canada of its type. It is put together as multiple single-span truss bridges made from steel, connected to form multiple large sections. The steel is painted white.

== History ==
The bridges were built between 1900 and 1902, and part of a ceremonial route leading from Rideau Hall to Parliament Hill.

They were named after the eighth Governor General of Canada, who was subsequently the Earl of 'Minto', where the name was derived from. This is also stated on the plaques at both ends of the bridges, which were installed when the bridge was finished. The Bridges were constructed by the National Capital Commission, which at the time was called the Ottawa Improvement Commission. Construction of the Minto Bridges was one of the first jobs of the Ottawa Improvement Commission – to 'beautify the city'. The designs were inspired by 'the beauty' of Washington, D.C., the United States capital.

The construction was completed by the Dominion Bridge Company from Montréal, Québec.

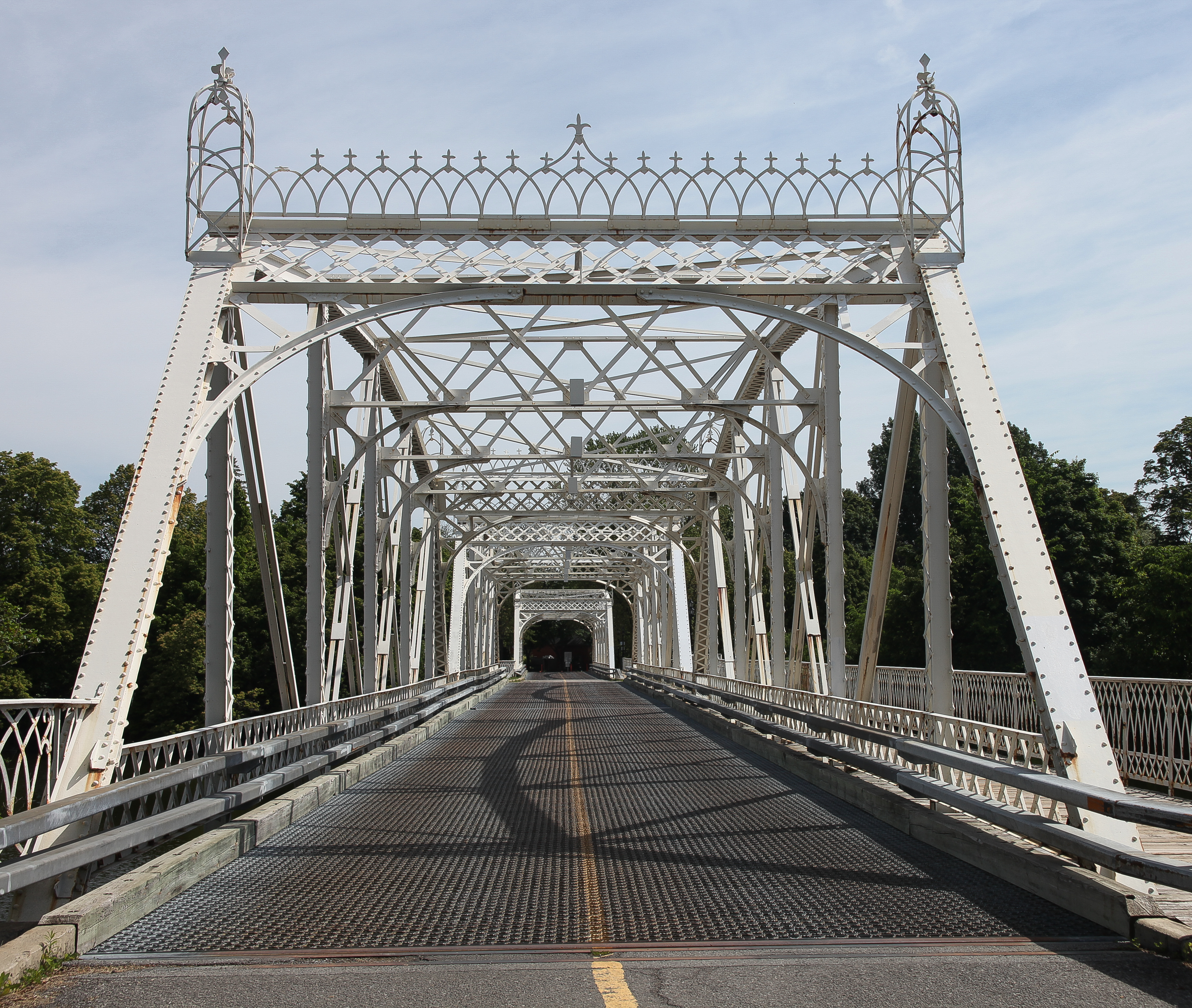
The middle of the three Minto Bridges.
