= Robert Cummings (politician) =

Canadian manufacturer, politician and community leader

Robert Cummings (June 16, 1833 – January 16, 1910) was a Canadian manufacturer and community leader.

He was born in Glouchester Township, Upper Canada to a family of Irish immigrants in 1833. He learned the trade of carriage making and became a leading Canadian manufacturer. He opened a general store and operated a flour mill on Cummings Island in the Rideau River which became the nucleus of a new community, Janeville, which eventually became part of Vanier. He served ten years as reeve in the township, was also a Justice of the Peace and was elected warden for Carleton County in 1876. Cummings was also a captain in the local militia. He married Agnes Borthwick (1840–1921).

The Cummings Bridge across the Rideau River was named after him.
