= Rideau Falls =

Waterfalls in Ottawa, Canada

Coordinates: 45.441405°N 75.69623°W

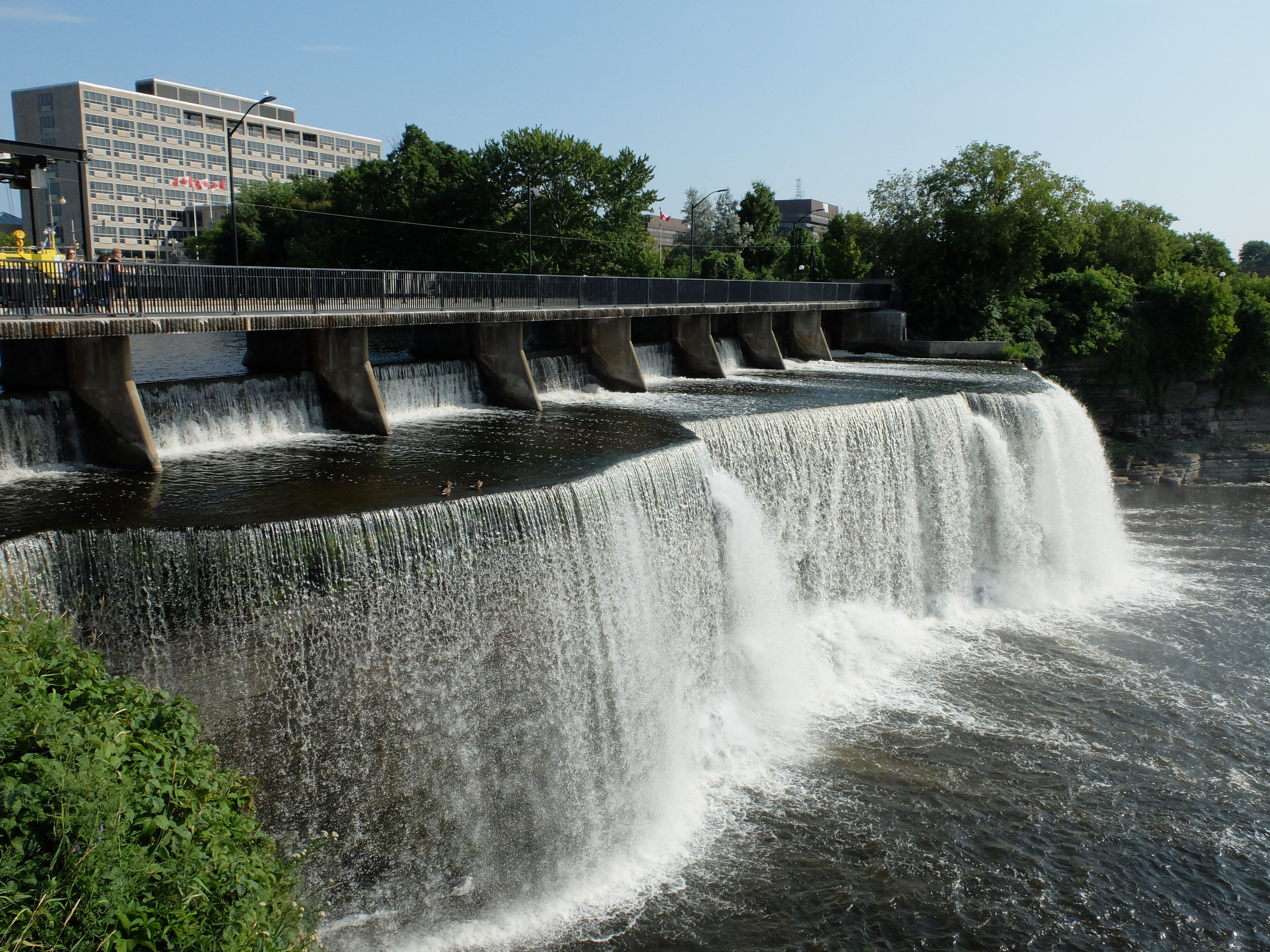
The Rideau Falls (August 2025)

The Rideau Falls (French: Chutes Rideau) are two waterfalls located in Ottawa, Ontario, Canada, where the Rideau River empties into the Ottawa River.

== Description ==
The falls are approximately 35 feet (11 m) tall. They are divided into two by Green Island, which splits the Rideau River prior to reaching the falls. At the top of the falls, across each of these two branches of the river, is a stoplog dam that regulates the flow of the river and was formerly used to power industry in the area. The dams require coordination with the ice blasting operations along the river that are conducted by the municipality each spring.

To the west of the falls is the headquarters of the National Research Council, to the east are the Canada and the World Pavilion and the French Embassy, and to the southeast (on Green Island) is Ottawa's Old City Hall.

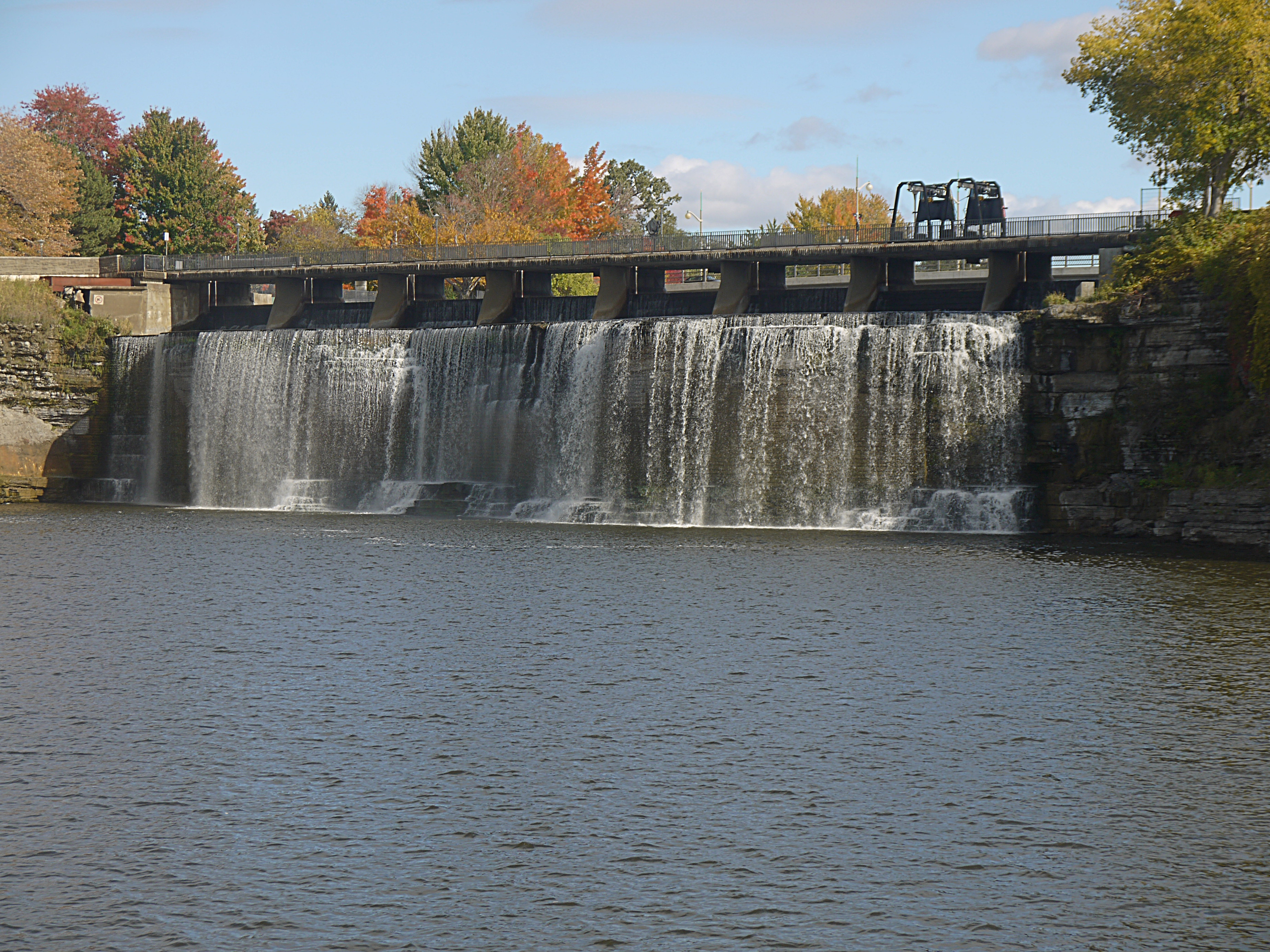
The eastern branch of the falls, as seen from the Ottawa River

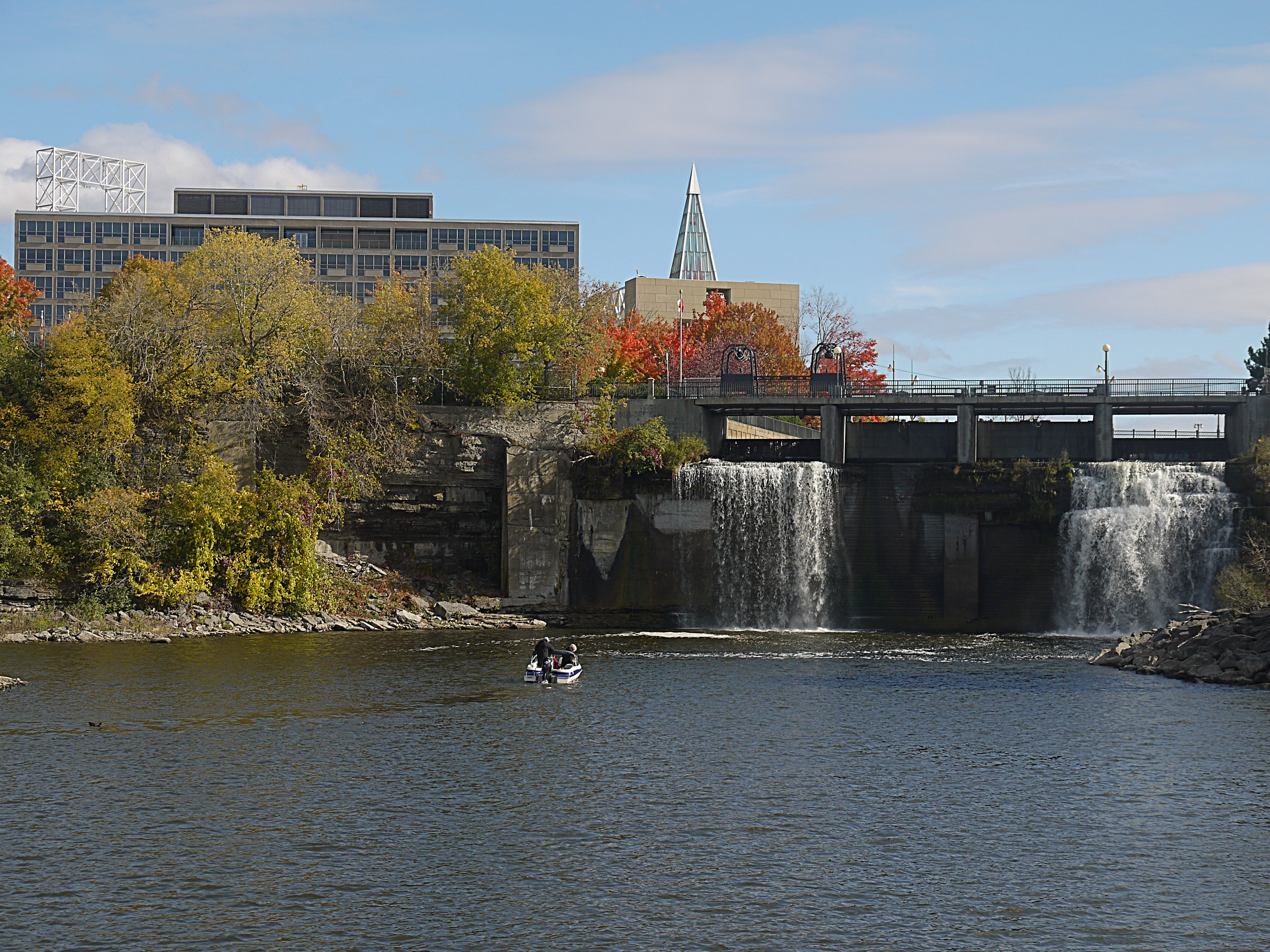
The western branch of the falls (with Old City Hall in the background)

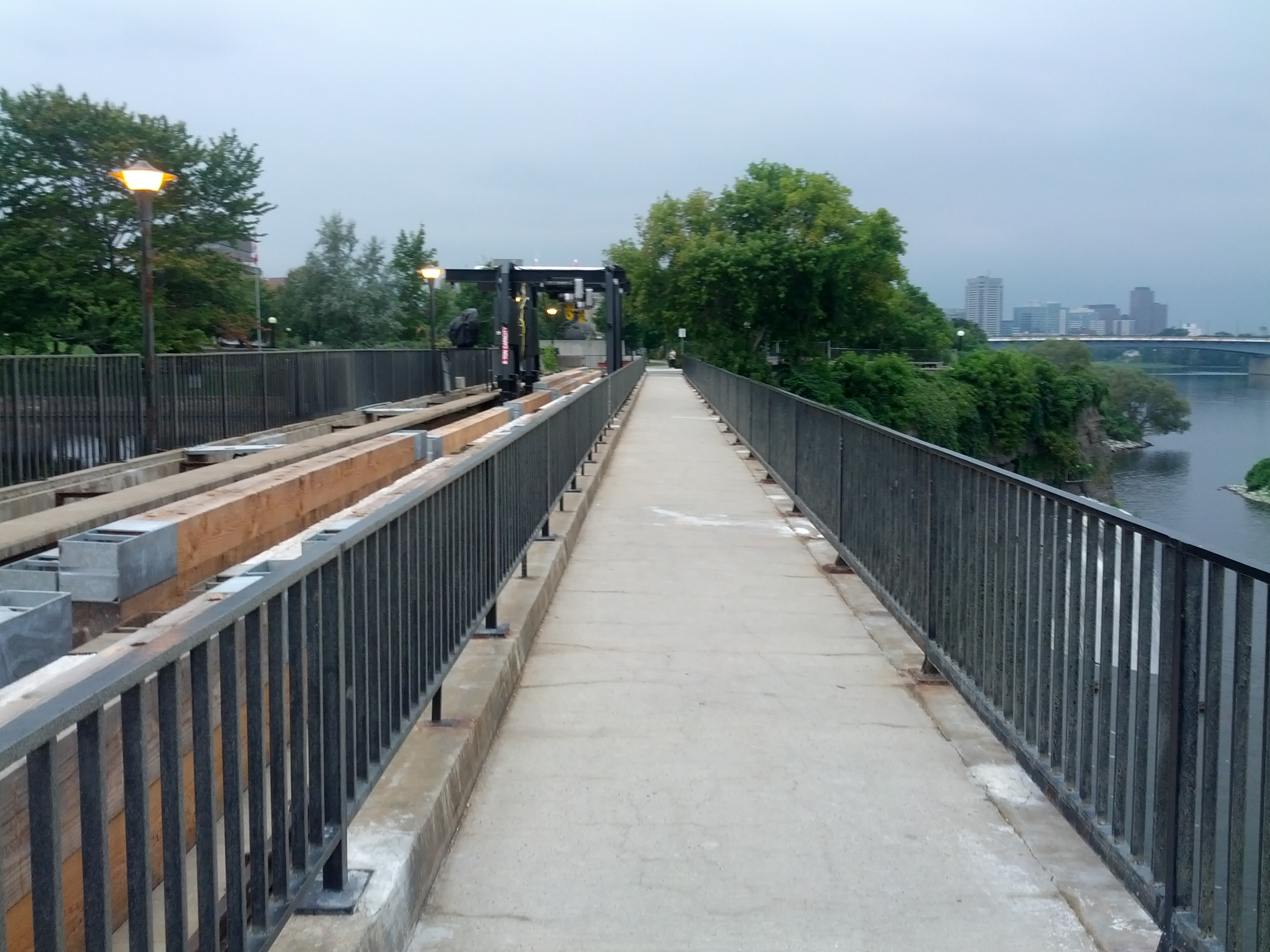
Top of the dam and bridge over the falls

== History ==
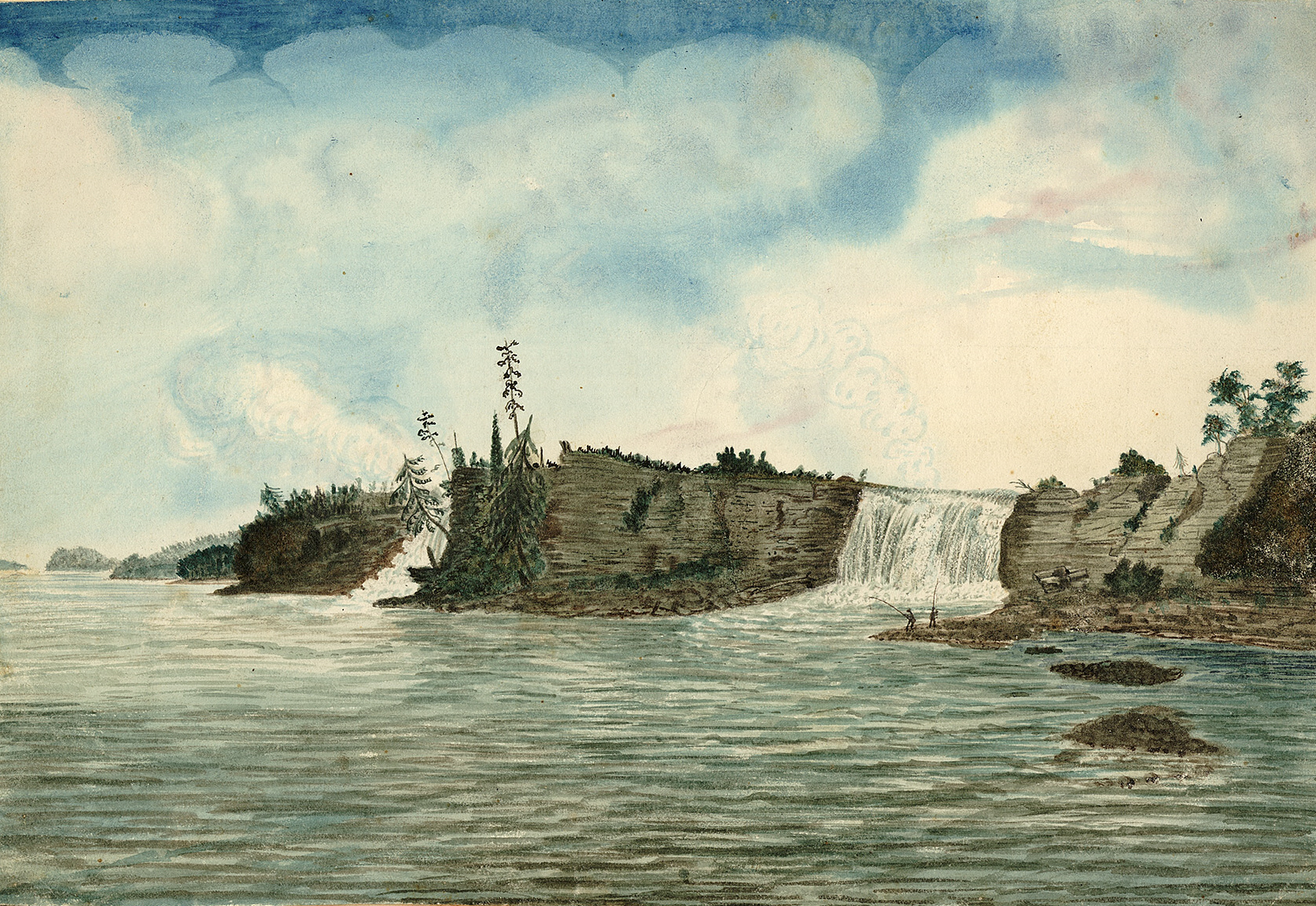
Rideau Falls in their original state, 1826

Samuel de Champlain described the falls as "...a marvelous fall...it descends a height of twenty or twenty-five fathoms with such impetuosity that it makes an arch nearly four hundred paces broad." The falls were named by the early French for their resemblance to a curtain, or rideau in French. The Rideau River was later named after the falls. The Rideau Canal, completed in 1832, was constructed to bypass these falls and the Hog's Back Falls.

In the 19th century, the falls were part of an industrial complex, during which period the dams were also constructed. The eastern dam was rebuilt in 1968 and the western dam was rebuilt in 1999. The Canadian government took ownership of the area after World War II and redeveloped it into a park (Rideau Falls Park).

== See also ==
- List of waterfalls
- List of waterfalls in Canada
