= Maple Island (Rideau River) =

Island

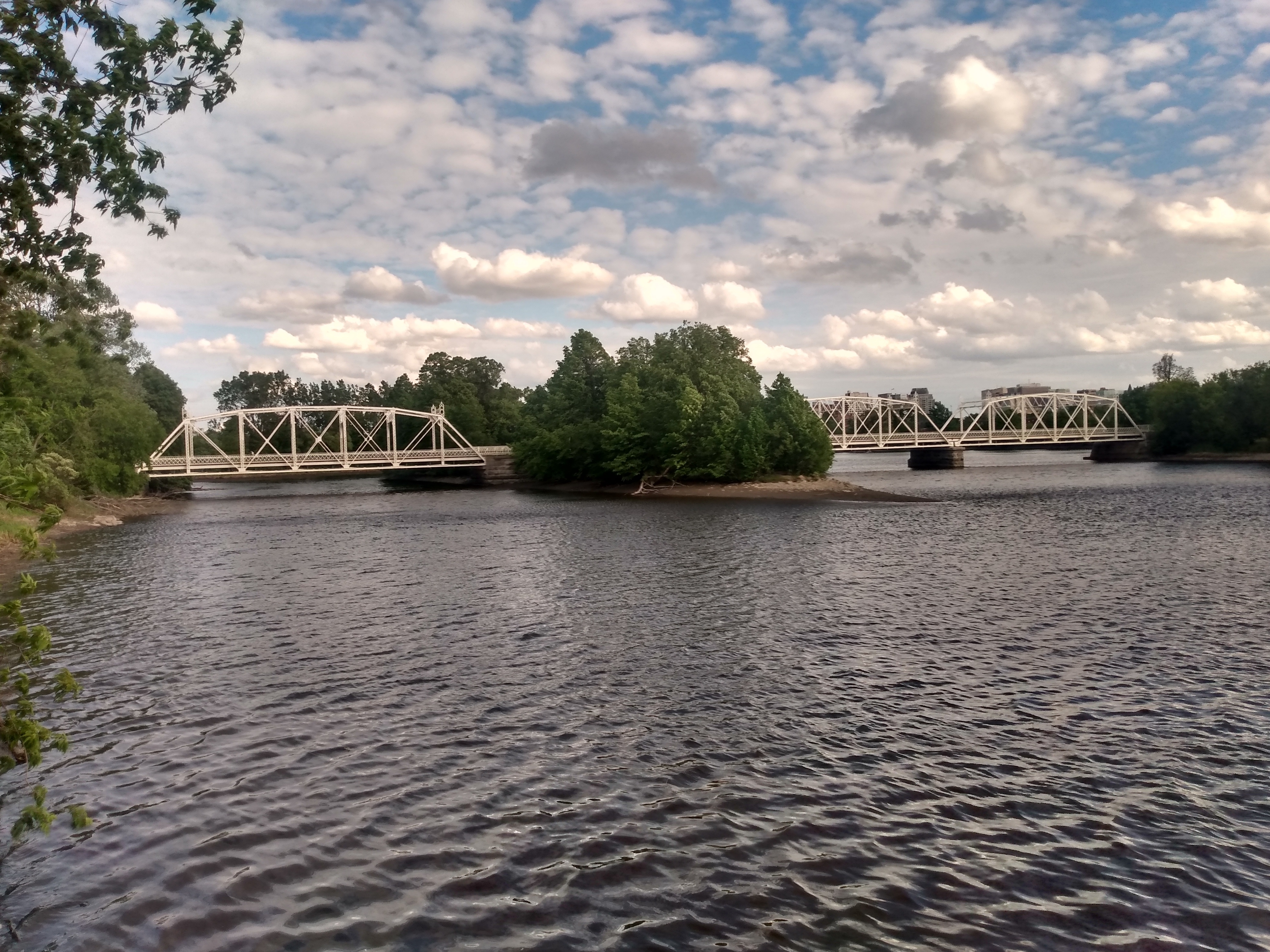

- Location within Southern Ontario Location within Canada

Geography
- Location: Rideau River
- Coordinates: 45°26′22″N 75°41′29″W
- Area: 2 acres (0.81 ha)
- Length: 192 m (630 ft)
- Width: 62 m (203 ft)
- Highest elevation: 56 m (184 ft)

Administration
- Canada
- Province: Ontario
- Census Division: Ottawa
- Ward: Rideau-Rockcliffe Ward

Maple Island is an island in the Rideau River, located about 350m from the mouth of the river, between the neighbourhood of New Edinburgh and Green Island in Ottawa, Ontario, Canada.

The island was once part of a group of three islands known as the Maple Islands, however, the southern two islands were later merged, and then the channel between the new southern island and Stanley Park was filled in around the late 1960s, and it is now a peninsula.

Maple Island is connected to both New Edinburgh and Green Island by the Minto Bridges, built between 1900 and 1902. Other than the Bridges, the only structures on the island are the Maple Island Hungarian Memorial and RISE, a public art sculpture.

The Maple Island Hungarian Memorial was erected in 2006 as a thank you to Canada for welcoming refugees following the 1956 Hungarian Revolution. Its inscription reads "May this monument be a lasting symbol of the gratitude of Hungarian refugees who, having escaped after the revolution in Hungary, were welcomed and provided a safe haven to rebuild their lives in Canada." The memorial also contains two totem poles created by Les Józsa. There was controversy when it was installed, because the National Capital Commission, who owns the island, would not allow mention of the freedom fighters of the revolution on the monument as "monuments on NCC property may commemorate international events only if they had a significant and demonstrable impact on Canada and the Canadian way of life."

The RISE sculpture was designed by Amy Thompson, and installed in 2019. It represents both a Great blue heron and a beluga whale, and its white finish is a reference to the Minto Bridges, and the white pond lily that surrounds the island in the river. Along the base of the sculpture is a sound wave pattern that is engraved in the metal, and is written in the Algonquin language.

== History ==
The island was bought by the federal government for $1 from Annie Keefer, at some point before her death in 1906. Early in its history, the island was used as a dump until 1926, the site of the Minto bathing beach until 1935, and as a lawn bowling site for the New Edinburgh Lawn Bowling Club.

In 1964, there was a plan to move the Fraser School House museum to the island as one of the city's Canadian Centennial projects.

In 1982, there were plans to construct a gazebo or circular bandshell on the island. However, the provincial government rejected a grant application for the project.
