= Cummings Island =

Uninhabited island in Ottawa, Canada

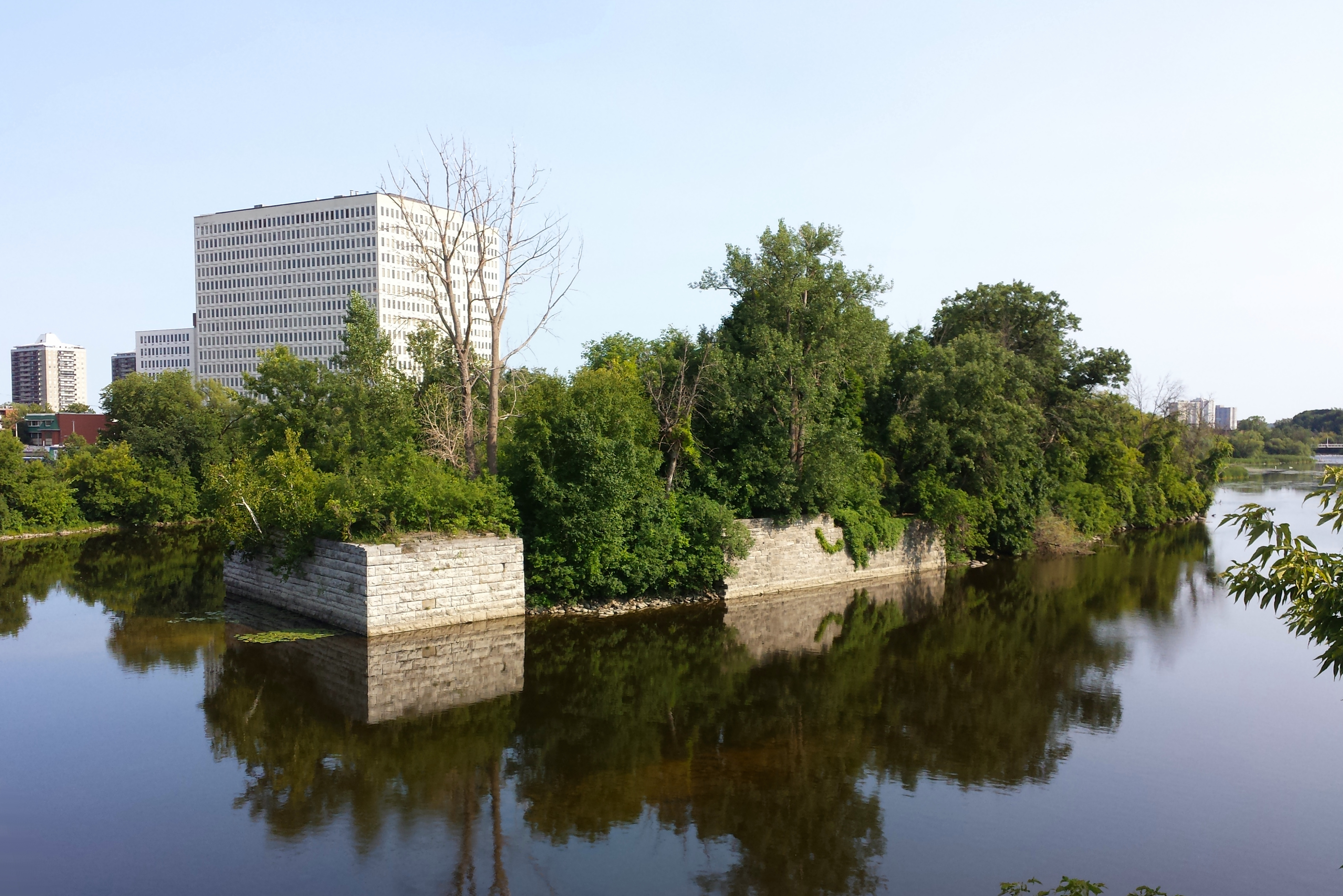

- Location within Southern Ontario Location within Canada
- Etymology: Micah Cummings, settler

Geography
- Location: Rideau River
- Coordinates: 45°25′56″N 75°40′16″W

Administration
- Canada
- Province: Ontario
- County: Carleton County
- City: Ottawa

Cummings Island is an uninhabited island in the Rideau River in the city of Ottawa in Canada and the site of a former settlement.

== History ==
The island's first settler was Micah Cummings, who built his house in 1840 and operated a ferry across the Rideau River until a simple wooden bridge was built a few years later. Micah Cummings did not die in 1847 and was buried on the island.

In 1864, Robert Cummings, son of Micah, bought the island from the government for $4 and built a store (with post office), flour mill and carriage factory there. During this period the island thrived as a commercial hub between Bytown and Janeville (later Eastview, and still later Vanier), even having the first telephone in what was then Gloucester Township.

In 1891, the old wooden bridge was replaced by a new steel bridge, which was originally named Bingham's Bridge, after Ottawa mayor Samuel Bingham, but this name never caught on. Thirty years later it was replaced by the Cummings Bridge, which was built some 12 metres (39 ft) downstream causing Cummings Island to lose its connection to the shore.

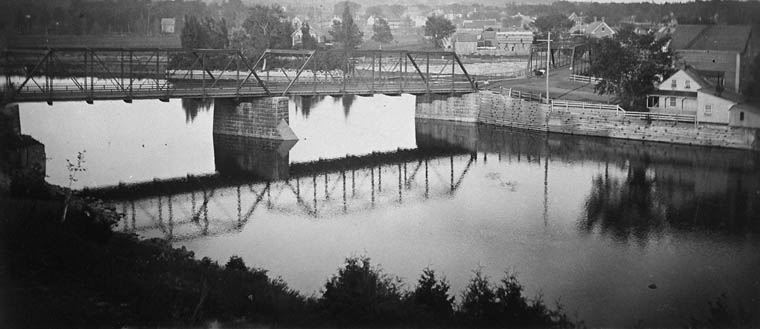
Cummings Bridge and Island in 1896.jp

In 1922, the city of Ottawa bought the island from Cummings' sons for $30,000, and all the buildings were demolished. Since 1923, the island has been uninhabited. A stone abutment is the only structure that remains on the island, it was built to protect the island from erosion in the spring, when the river thaws and sends ice crashing into it.

== Other islands ==
Another island with the same name is located in Little Sand Lake in Kenora District, Ontario (50.021809°N 94.701488°W).
