= Brewer Park Pond =

Artificial pond in Ontario, Canada

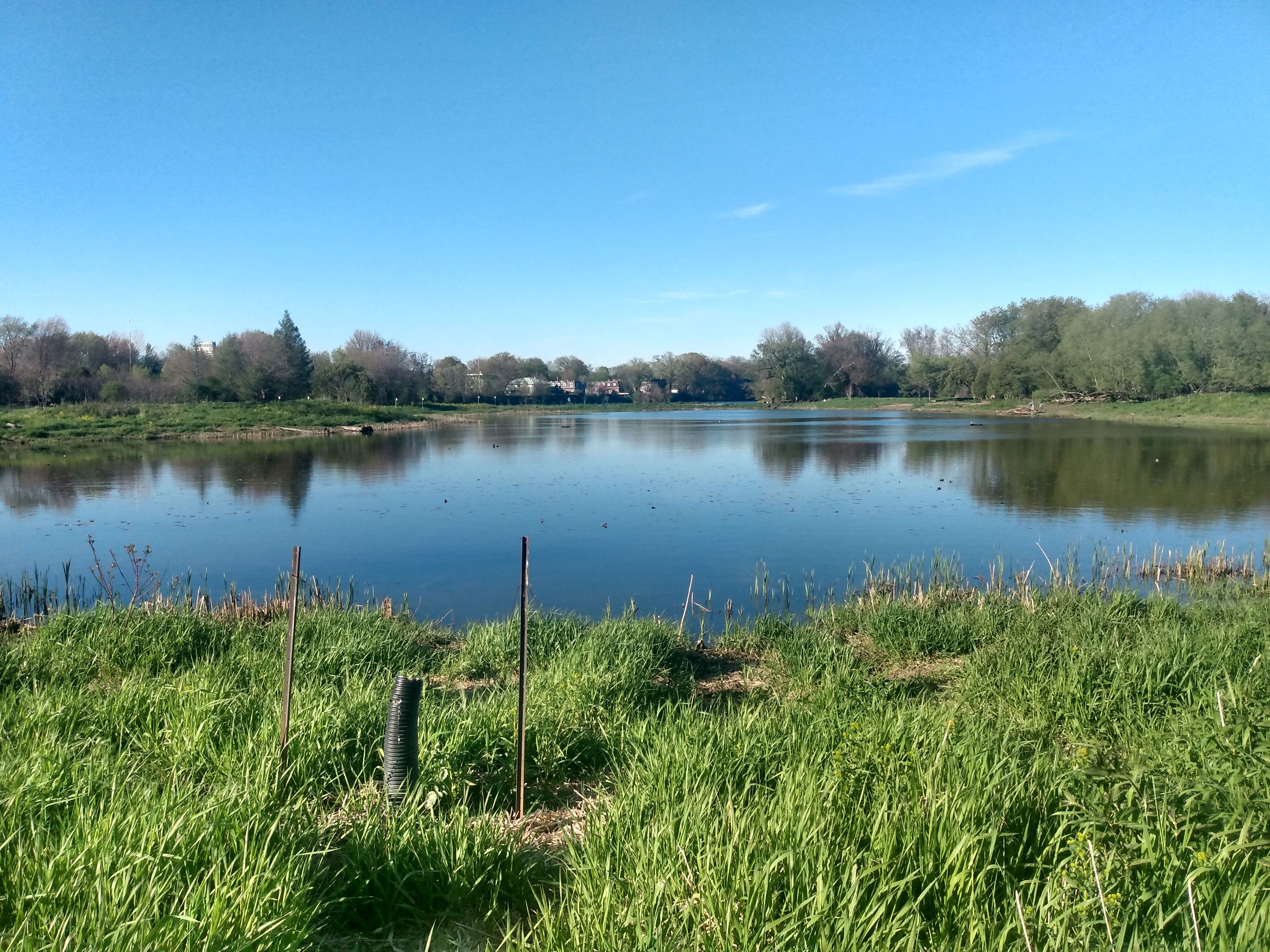

- Location within Ontario
- Location: Eastern Ontario
- Coordinates: 45°23′08″N 75°41′12″W
- Primary outflows: Rideau River
- Basin countries: Canada
- Max. length: 190 m (620 ft)
- Max. width: 88 m (289 ft)
- Surface elevation: 57 m (187 ft)
- Settlements: Ottawa

Brewer Park Pond is an artificial pond located in Brewer Park in the neighbourhood of Old Ottawa South in Ottawa, Ontario, Canada. It is connected to the Rideau River via a culvert.

== History ==
The pond was constructed in the early 1960s as a "swimming hole" from an area that had previously been a wetland of three small islands, known as the Bathing Islands, with channels between them in the Rideau River. The pond, which was completely separated from the river, was used for swimming until the pond was infected by bacteria and the spread of algae. The provincial health department ordered the pond's swimming facilities closed in 1971. During the 1970s, the pond was used for model yacht regattas.

=== Naturalization ===
In the 1990s there was a large-scale community project to naturalize the area. The project, under the leadership of ECOS (the Environment Committee of the Ottawa South Community Association) saw the planting of thousands of trees and shrubs by local residents, the transformation of the hard-pack parking lot into a meadow, the construction of the pedestrian bridge between the park and Carleton University, and numerous other projects. For a number of years the pond area served as the location of Earth Day Ottawa activities. The naturalization project culminated in 2000 with a major federal government Millennium Grant to dredge a fish nursery on the river's edge, develop interpretive materials, and other undertakings.

=== Restoration ===
Following funding from developers Richcraft and Minto, the pond was restored in 2014 by the Rideau Valley Conservation Authority, when it was re-connected to the river via a culvert. The funding came as a result of compensation for the loss of a habitat in a new development project in Orleans. The restoration project included creating a wetland with shoreline plantings, and habitats for breeding birds, amphibians, turtle nesting beds and basking logs. The culvert allowed fish from the Rideau River to use the pond.

== Ecology ==
The bottom of the pond is made of clay and organic content, and it is surrounded by a large amount of water lily tubers and grasses. Plants in or around the pond include white water lily, water celery, pond weed, yellow water lily, bulrush, sedges, willow and silver maples.

Fish in the pond include yellow perch, muskellunge, northern pike, pumpkinseed, banded killifish, northern redbelly dace and bluntnose minnow. Animals include the calico pennant dragonfly, snapping turtle, wood duck, beaver, green frog, bullfrog, great blue heron, painted turtle, mudpuppy, muskrat and the red-winged blackbird.
