= St. Elijah's Housing =

Coordinates: 45.413165°N 75.699969°W

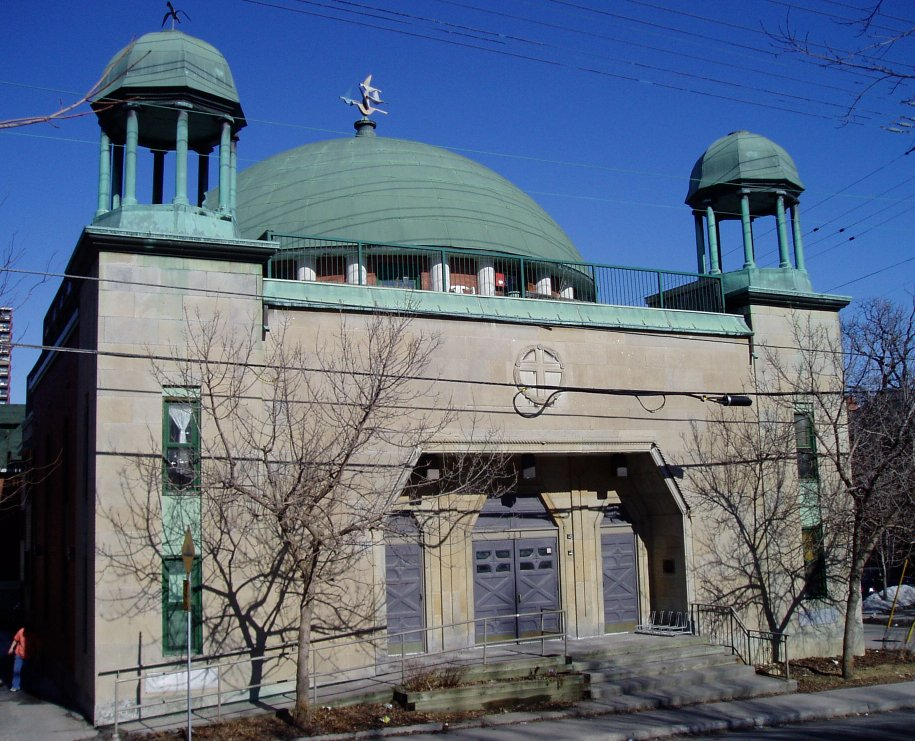
St. Elijah's Housing at 341 Lyon

St. Elijah's Housing is a building in Ottawa, Ontario, Canada. Originally a church, it is currently a block of 40 residential apartments.

The site at Lyon Street and Maclaren Street in the northwest of Centretown was originally home to a Pentecostal congregation. It was purchased by Antiochian Orthodox Lebanese immigrants who opened the St. Elijah Antiochian Orthodox Church in 1931. The original building was destroyed in a fire in 1949; the current Byzantine structure was erected to replace it. With the Lebanese Civil War Ottawa saw an influx of Antiochian Orthodox immigrants. The congregation thus decided to move to a larger structure on Riverside Drive. The building was sold in 1989 to a partnership of the local Anglican Diocese and CCOC, the Centretown Citizens (Ottawa) Corporation, a non-profit housing trust. In the Anglican half of the structure are twenty apartments for homeless women. In the CCOC portion there are twenty bachelor apartments. The conversion of the church into apartments while retaining the building's exterior character received a City of Ottawa Heritage Award.
