= Brewer Park =

Park in Ontario, Canada

Coordinates: 45°23′10″N 75°41′20″W

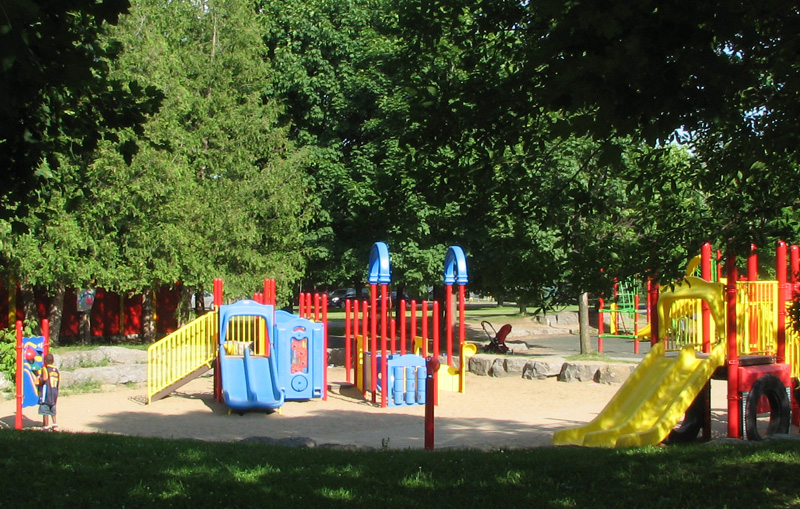
Playground facilities on the northeastern side of Brewer Park

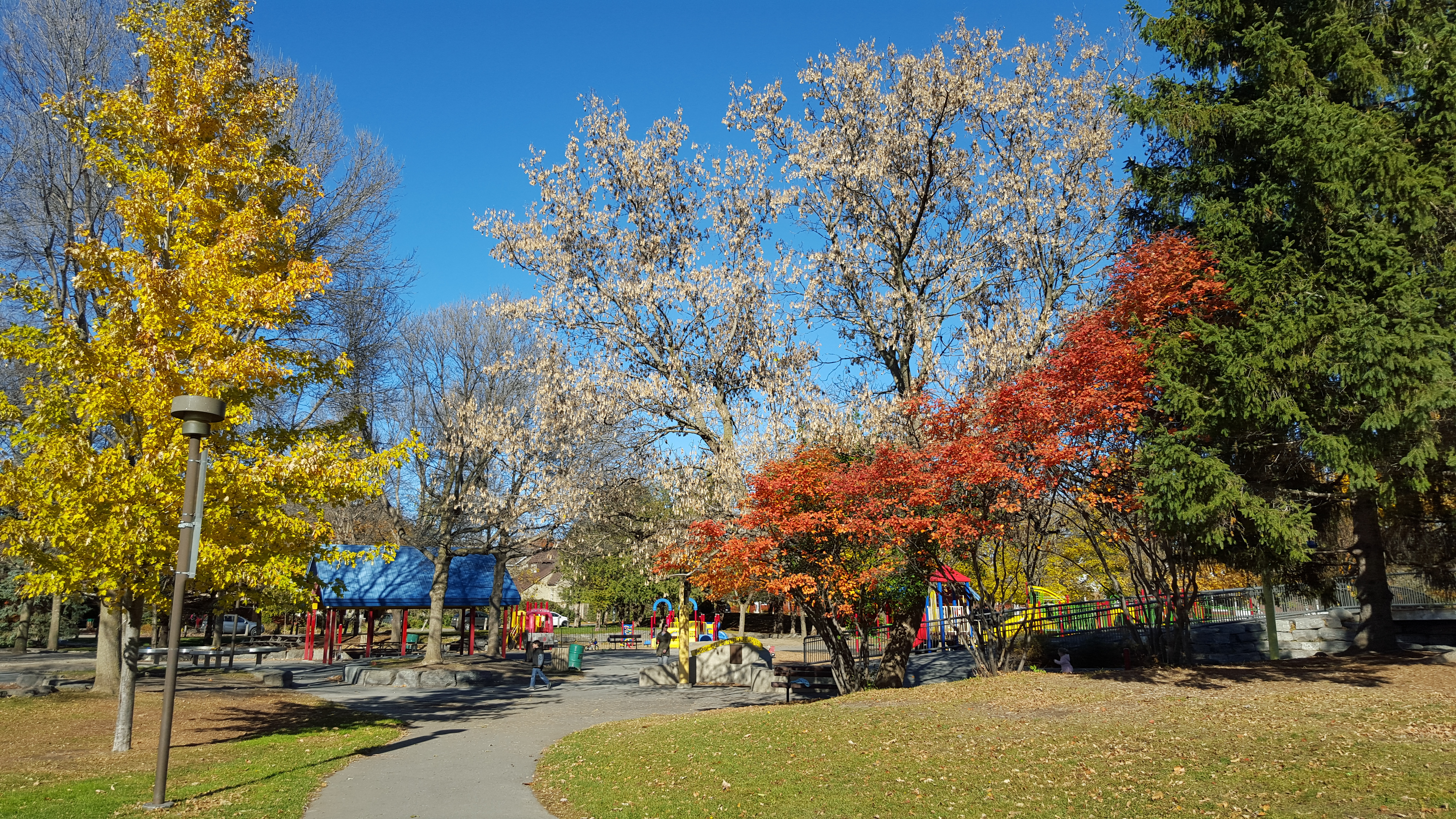
Trees on the northern side of Brewer Park, Ottawa, ON - November 2016

Brewer Park is a municipal park in Ottawa, Ontario, Canada. It is located on the north bank of the Rideau River at Bronson Avenue, across from Carleton University.

In the winter, Brewer park houses a world-class speed skating oval, two smaller-sized hockey rinks as well as Canada's largest Legal Graffiti wall under Dunbar Bridge. It is one of the most popular places for the students of Carleton University, who can study or involve themselves in many sports.

== Sport and playground facilities ==
Brewer park contains facilities for both the young and old.

- 3 soccer fields (two are also football accessible)
- 3 baseball diamonds
- a hockey arena (Brewer arena)
- legal graffiti wall
- many biking paths
- half of a basketball court
- a mini-waterpark
- 4 play-structures
- waterfront and pond
- a community garden, Brewer Park Community Garden, including a geodesic dome greenhouse

Brewer Park is also home to the annual House of Paint Hip Hop Festival. Over 200 urban artists worldwide gather once a year to celebrate the positivity of the hip-hop community with a block-party-style festival. At this event the underbelly of the Dunbar Bridge is covered with art from 75 graffiti artists from around North America.

Though not part of the park, Brewer is adjacent to the Ottawa Tennis & Lawn Bowling Club, to the Westboro Academy, and to Brewer Pool, a fairly large indoor pool.

== History ==
In the 1960s and 1970s, Brewer park housed a public beach that encircled Brewer Park Pond, a shallow pond approximately 100 metres in diameter, which drew a young crowd around the area. But pollution measurement and clarity standards in Ontario changed and enclosed beaches were not permitted, and the beach was closed permanently in 1971. The pond is still there, and the building that once housed a canteen and many storage items (known as the Beach Pavilion), previously used as a locker room for many football teams who play on the neighbouring field, was taken down in December 2017 as it had reached the end of its functional life-cycle and in need of significant repairs. The Pavilion had been situated on posts raising it above the floodplain and allowing it to survive, relatively unharmed, during the yearly spring freshet.

The remainder of the park, tennis club and nearby low-lying residential areas are protected by a low berm/dam constructed in the 1980s.

== House of Paint wall ==
In 2003 the wall along the Dunbar Bridge underpass—which runs under Bronson Avenue where it goes over the Rideau river—became Ottawa's first legal graffiti wall. Graffiti art had been painted here for years before the legalization, but the wall now is an open forum for artists to show creativity. Most works of art are not around for more than a couple weeks due to the painting being replaced.

The "House of Paint" graffiti jam started in 2003 as a celebration of the creation of Ottawa's first Free Zone for Legal Art. Since then it's become a yearly event under the bridge.

Aside from the paint being used on the wall, the House of Paint Festival is now the most Eco-Conscious festival in the Ottawa area. There are many recycling and eco-friendly initiatives to take care of waste from the event. HOP staff also have a "Clean up day" around the event space leading up to the event to do their part to keep things clean.
