= Cummings Bridge =

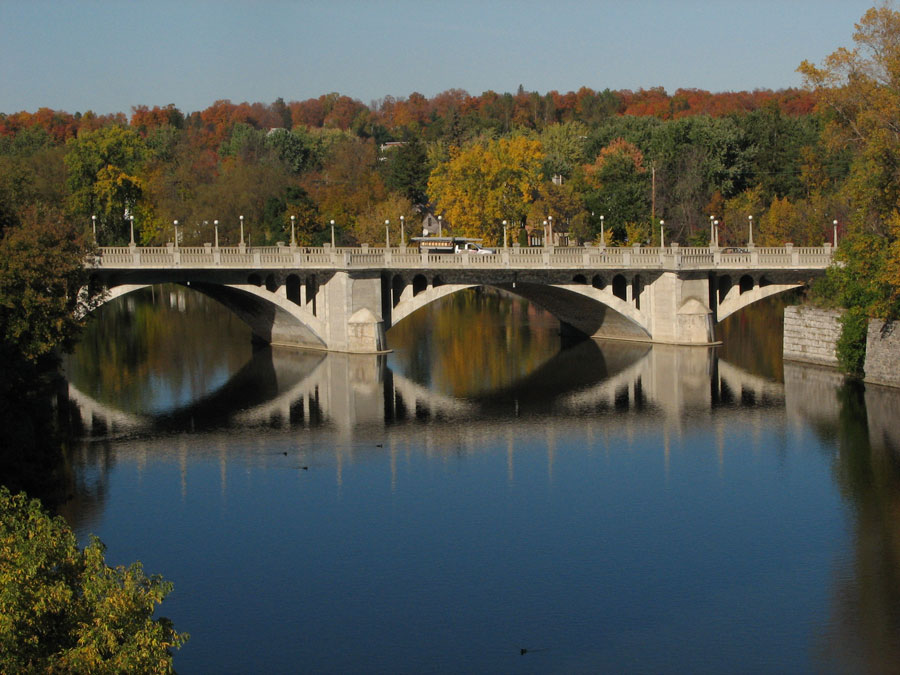
- Coordinates: 45.433199°N 75.6712°W
- Carries: 4-lane road, sidewalks, bicycle lane
- Crosses: Rideau River
- Locale: Ottawa, Ontario, Canada
- Named for: Charles Cummings

Characteristics
- Material: Reinforced concrete
- Total length: 213 m (699 ft)
- Width: 18.21 m (59.7 ft)

History
- Construction start: 1921
- Rebuilt: 1996

Location
- Interactive map of Cummings Bridge

The Cummings Bridge in Ottawa, Ontario, Canada, crosses the Rideau River, connecting Rideau Street to Montreal Road in Vanier. It is a multi-span open spandrel arch bridge, constructed in 1921 and renovated in 1996.

== History ==
The area east of the Cummings Bridge, later named Vanier was first linked to the Sandy Hill area of Ottawa with a wooden bridge erected in 1835, which went over Cummings Island in the Rideau River. The Cummings family settled the island, had a store there, and the island and bridge there became associated with the Cummings name. In 1891, the old wooden bridge was replaced by a steel bridge, which the city wanted to name Bingham's Bridge, after Ottawa mayor Samuel Bingham, but this name never caught on.

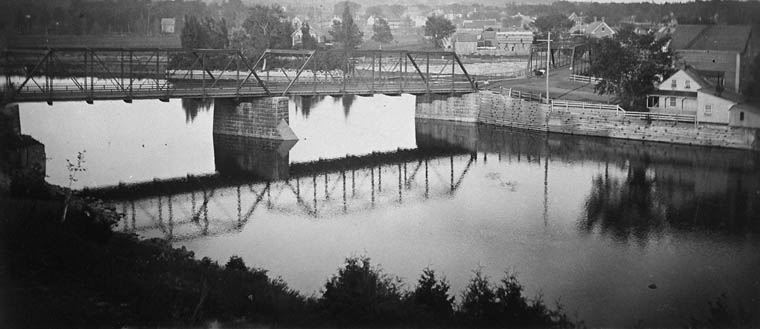
Previous Cummings Bridge in 1896

The current bridge was constructed in 1921, some 12 metres (39 ft) downstream from the steel bridge, bypassing Cummings Island.

Charles Cummings had a son, Robert Cummings who became Reeve of Gloucester Township and Warden of Carleton County, Ontario.
