= Porter Island =

Island in Rideau River, Ontario, Canada

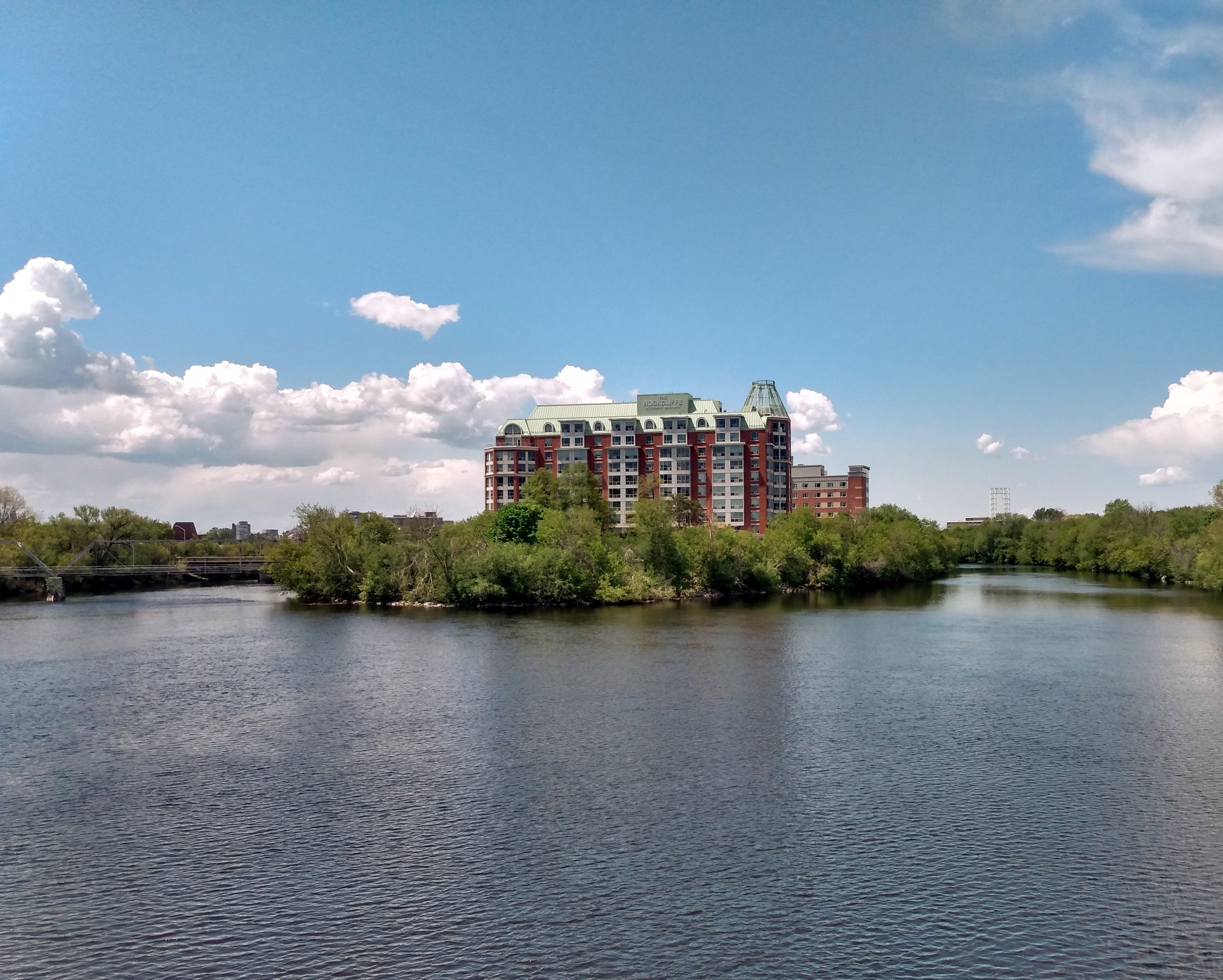

- Location within Southern Ontario Location within Canada
- Etymology: John Porter

Geography
- Location: Rideau River
- Coordinates: 45°26′15″N 75°40′56″W
- Area: 0.033 km^{2} (0.013 sq mi)
- Length: 346 m (1135 ft)
- Width: 121 m (397 ft)
- Highest elevation: 59 m (195 ft)

Administration
- Canada
- Province: Ontario
- Census Division: Ottawa
- Ward: Rideau-Vanier Ward

Demographics
- Population: 264 (Canada 2021 Census)
- Pop. density: 4,363.6/km^{2} (11301.7/sq mi)

Porter Island is an island in the Rideau River, located just over 1 km from the mouth of the river, between the neighbourhoods of New Edinburgh and Lower Town in Ottawa, Ontario, Canada.

Porter Island is connected to the Lowertown neighbourhood by the Porter Island Bridge and a closed off steel truss pedestrian bridge. The latter bridge, was built in 1894 by the Dominion Bridge Company, and was apparently closed off due to deteriorating wooden planks. It is home to the Garry J. Armstrong Long Term Care Home and the Chartwell Rockcliffe Retirement Residence.

== History ==
Porter Island is named for John Porter, an early inhabitant of the city, who served as Bytown's city engineer. During the late 19th and early 20th centuries, the island served as a refuge for typhoid and smallpox patients to keep them isolated from the rest of the city, though the site had to be abandoned every spring due to flooding. Ottawa City Council chose the island in 1893 during that year's smallpox epidemic to serve as the site of an isolation hospital, due to the island's isolation and low price of construction. Construction of the hospital was halted due to lack of funds, "shoddy workmanship", and flooding. The site would be demolished in 1904. The island then became a refuse dump.

In 1910, another hospital was built due to the 1910-1912 smallpox epidemic in the city. The island had a hospital for patients, consisting of a "miserable old clapboard shack 20 x 24 ft. and 1½ stories high, with stove pipe running up the stairway so that one had to go on hands and knees to get underneath it to go upstairs." Patients had to sleep three to a bed. When the hospital became to full to accommodate patients, they had to stay outside in tents, even in the winter. Nurses stayed in a bed in a small storage room, where patients also bathed. The site was so awful, that many exposed to smallpox hid from authorities to avoid being sent to the island, and guards were stationed on the island to avoid people escaping. The site was also ridden with rats due to it still being used as a dump. The "disgraceful" conditions of the site forced the construction of the Hopewell Isolation Hospital on the site in 1912, and opened in 1913. Thanks to the eradication of smallpox in Canada, the hospital was only used until 1945, when it converted into apartments. It was demolished in 1967.

In the mid-1950s, it was seen as a possible site for a new City Hall.

In the early 1960s, a 250-bed seniors residence called Island Lodge was built, and was opened in 1964, along with a new bridge to the island. This building would later become the Rockcliffe Retirement Residence. A second building was later built for less-sick patients. That building was replaced by the Gary J. Armstrong Long Term Care Centre in the early 2000s.

In 1986, the island was proposed as a site of the U.S. Embassy in Canada by the chair of the Regional Municipality of Ottawa-Carleton, Andrew S. Haydon.
