= Thomas Mooney (Canadian chaplain) =

Canadian chaplain (1906–1944)

Thomas Edmund Mooney
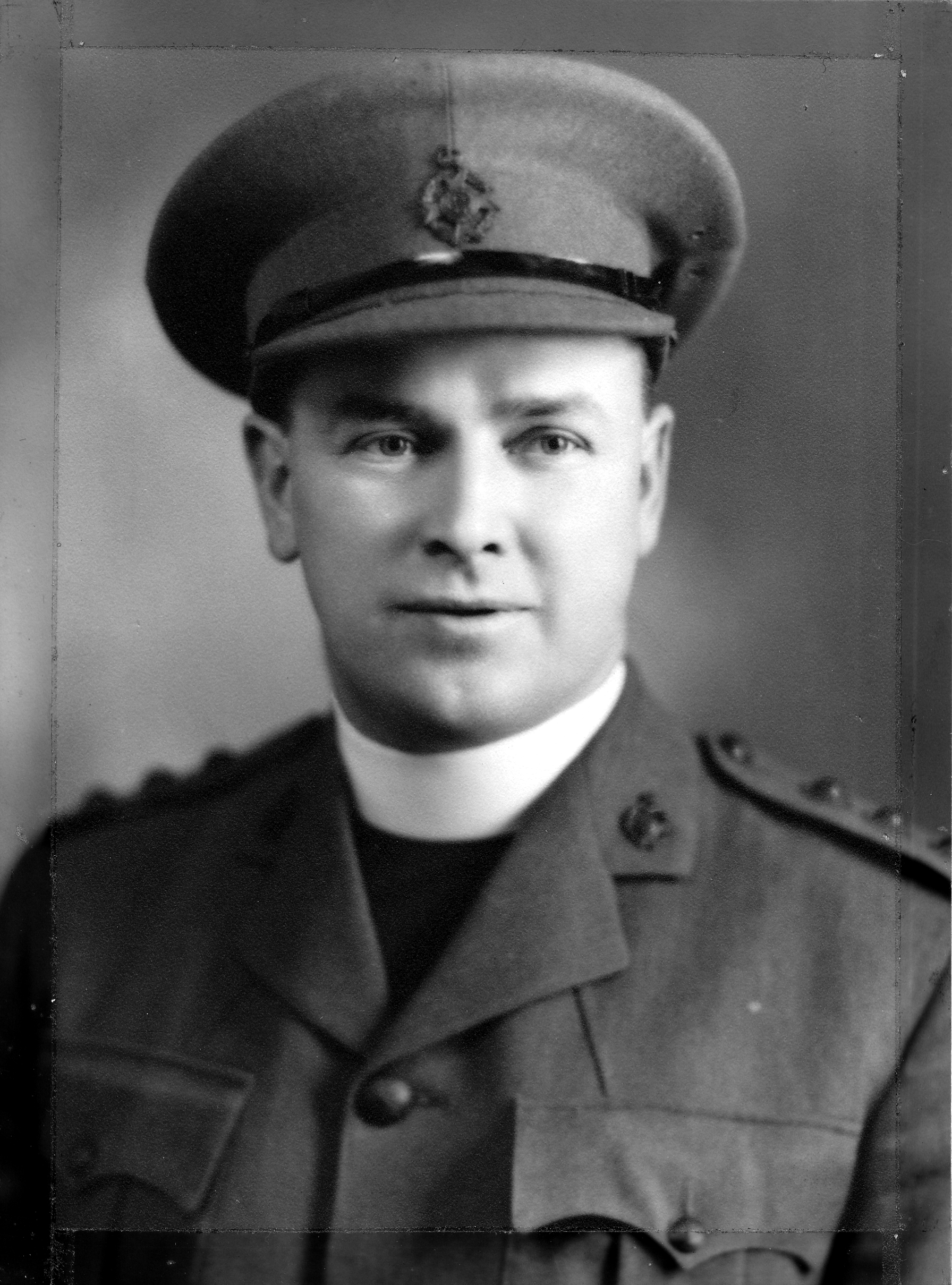
- Born: January 21, 1906; Westport, Ontario, Canada
- Died: September 14, 1944 (aged 38); Belgium
- Occupations: Director of Music, Kingston Cathedral; Honorary captain (The Reverend), Chaplain
- Parent(s): Michael Edmund Mooney (father); Anna Cecelia Mooney (mother)

Thomas Edmund Mooney (January 21, 1906 – September 14, 1944) was a Canadian chaplain who served in World War II. Mooney was the first Canadian Catholic Chaplain reported killed in action during World War II. Mooney served as Director of Music at St. Mary's Roman Catholic Cathedral in Islington, Ontario.

== History ==
Mooney was born in Westport, Ontario on January 21, 1906, to parents Michael Edmund and Anna Cecelia Mooney. Mooney's father, grandfather and great-grandfather were lockmasters at the Rideau Canal. Mooney's Bay Park was named after the Mooney family of lockmasters.

After graduating from high school, Mooney entered St. Michael's College, University of Toronto. He was a member of the Oratorical Club, the Quindecim Club, and the Literary Society. He was also a member of the Intercollegiate Boxing, Wrestling, and Fencing Team, winning letters for wrestling in the 158-pound class.

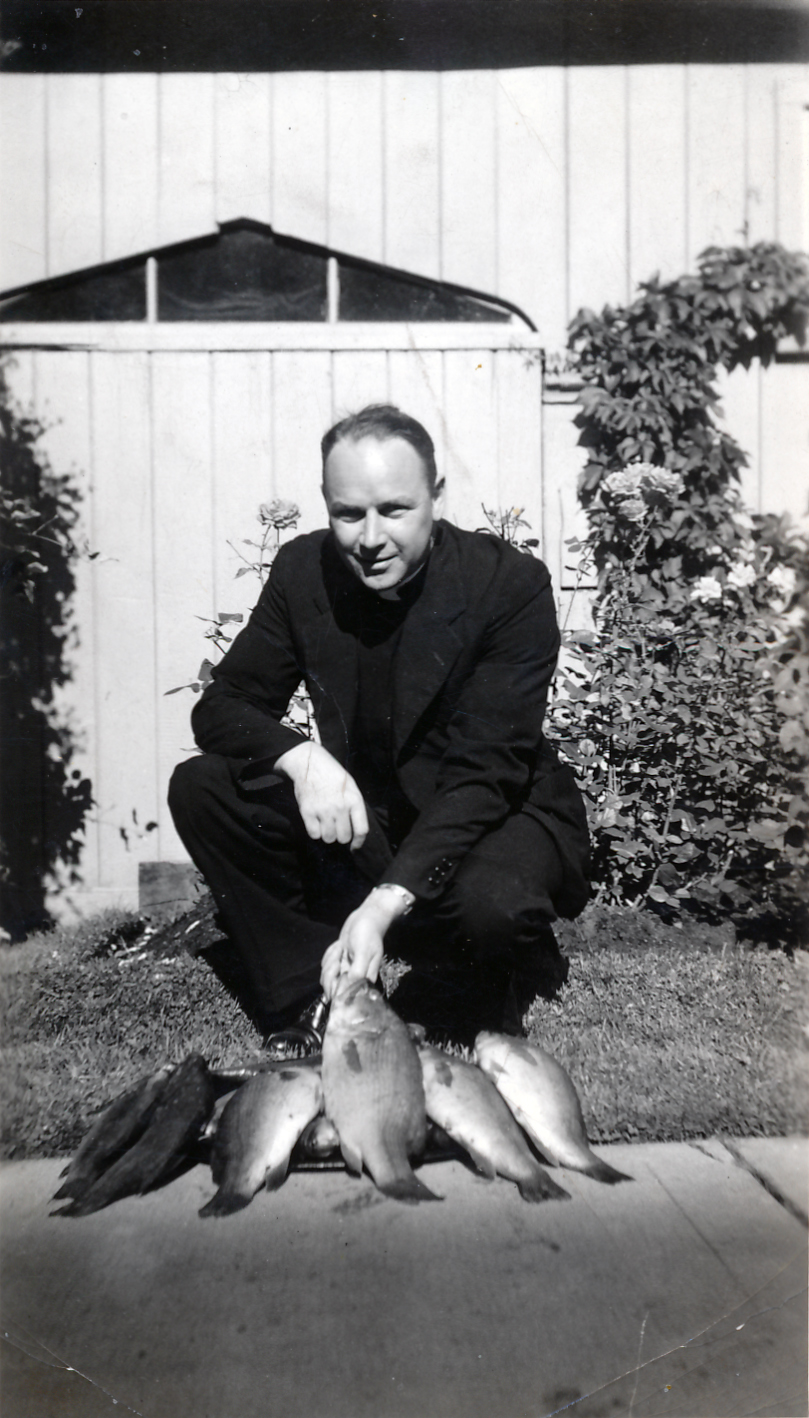
Father Tom Mooney enjoyed fishing

While at St. Michael's he decided to enter the priesthood. He attended St. Augustine's Seminary and was ordained in the Cathedral of the Immaculate Conception, Kingston on May 21, 1932. He served as Curate and Director of the Choir until January 10, 1942, when he became a Canadian Chaplain.

On September 14, 1944, the chaplain was killed in action at Moerkerke.

... padre Thomas Mooney, from Hamilton, Ontario, was killed by shellfire while ministering to wounded a few weeks after D-Day: he was buried in the Canadian cemetery at Eccloo, Belgium. As a tribute, the Protestant chaplains of his formation served as pallbearers.

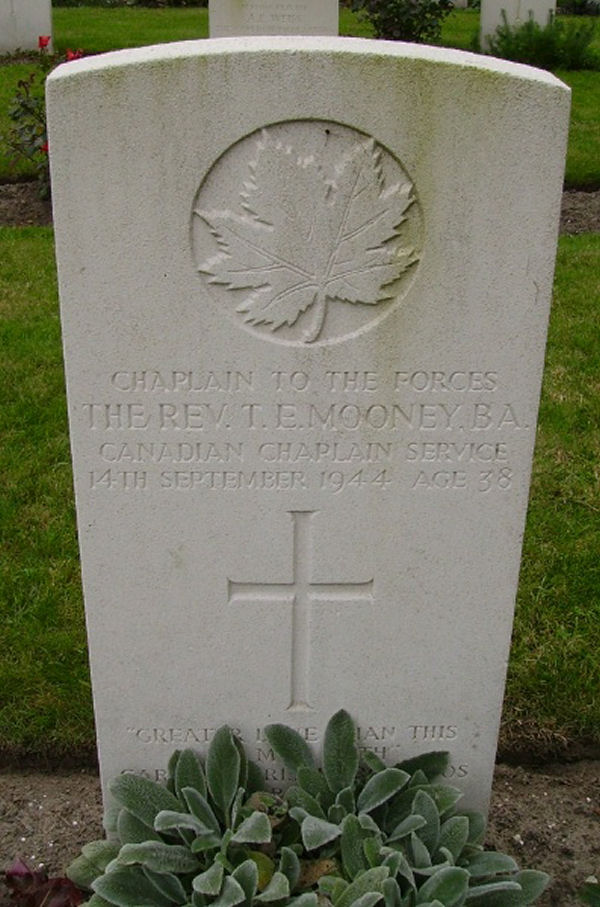
Permanent headstone of Father Tom Mooney in Belgium
