= Ice blasting =

Use of explosives to break ice in rivers

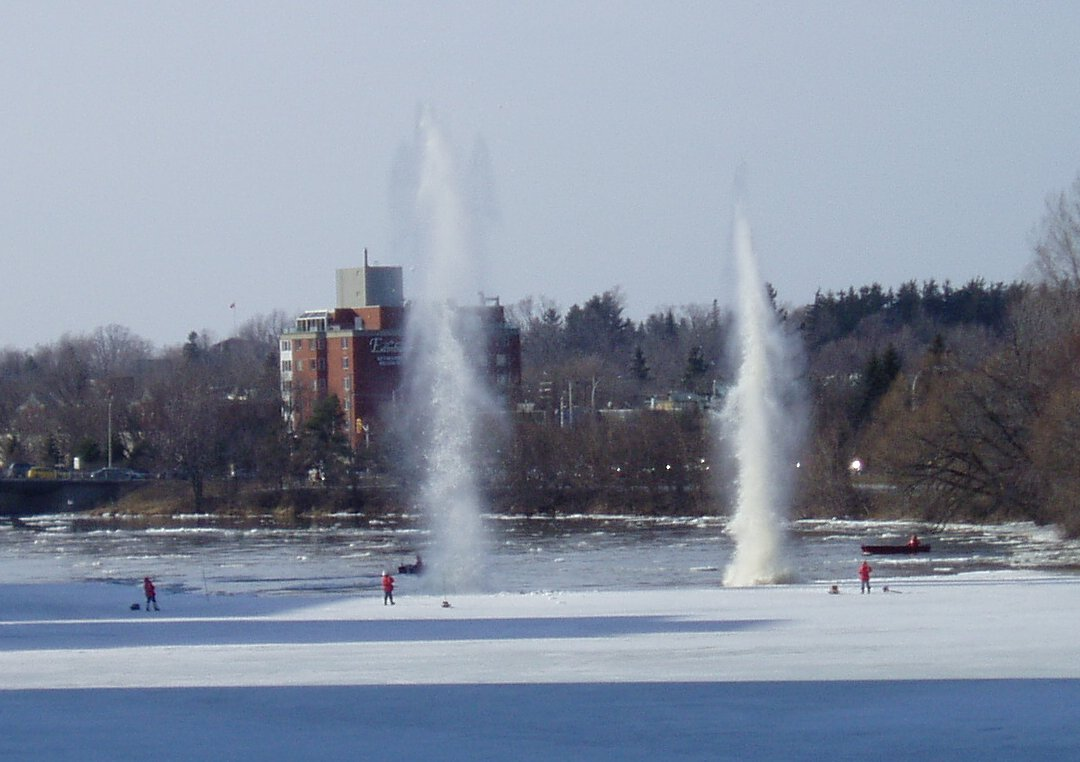
Preemptive ice blasting on the Rideau River in Ottawa

Ice blasting is the use of explosives to break up ice in rivers, aiding navigation and preventing flooding.

This is done during the spring when snow is melting and river ice is breaking up. There is always a chance that the ice flows could collide creating an ice jam and blocking the river. The river, filled with melt water, will quickly flood and often cause damage to nearby settlements. Thus in most northern areas governments quickly act to break up the ice jams before they can do much damage. This is most easily done with explosives. These explosives may be planted from the shore, or in some cases by helicopter. Explosives can also be remotely delivered by artillery or dropped by bombers. In the large rivers of the Siberia the Russian airforce is sometimes called in to bomb ice jams.

Some districts, where flooding is especially common, do preemptive ice blasting. The city of Ottawa, Ontario, Canada, for instance, blasts the Rideau River each spring to break up the ice. In 1994, for instance, 10,000 sticks of dynamite were used to break up ice along 9 kilometres of the river.

Ice blasting has a number of disadvantages. It is expensive and dangerous requiring highly skilled explosives experts. When blasting is occurring the public must be warned to keep their distance. The blasting has negative environmental consequences. Fish and other river creatures are inevitably killed and the river bottom is scarred. Unexploded ordnance can also be a concern where remote delivery is used.
