= Mooney's Bay Park =

Park in Ottawa, Canada

Coordinates: 45°22′06″N 75°41′33″W

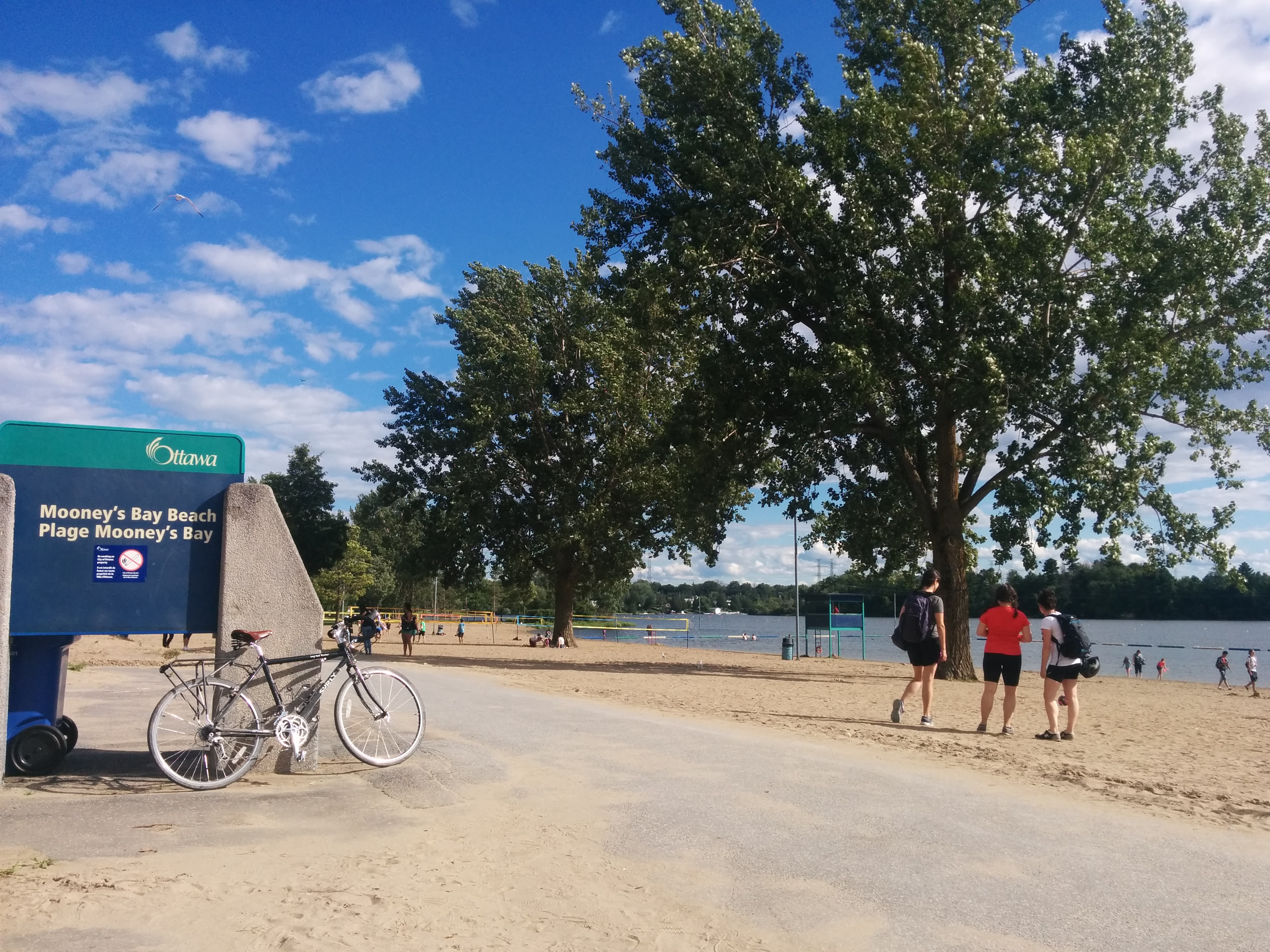
Mooney's Bay and the beach in Mooney's Bay Park

Mooney's Bay Park is a public park in Ottawa, Ontario, Canada, on the Rideau River. Its main entrance is on Riverside Drive, opposite of Ridgewood Avenue, but it can also be accessed from Hog's Back Road.

Mooney's Bay Park has a beach, picnic areas, a children's playground, the Sue Holloway Fitness Park, and is the site of the Terry Fox Stadium. Located at 2960 Riverside Drive, year-round activities are available such as swimming in the waters of the Rideau River, biking along paths that can take riders as far as the downtown core, and cross country skiing. A ski school is available, as are indoor change rooms. Since 2012, like all city parks and beaches, Mooney's Bay Park is regulated by a bylaw which prohibits smoking on all beach and park property.

In the summer, Mooney's Bay Beach is one of the City of Ottawa's four supervised beaches. The city's Parks, Recreation and Cultural Services Department set up a swimming area, which is supervised by trained lifeguards from 12pm-7pm each day, from the third week in June until the third week in August. From mid-May until early September, volleyball nets can be rented per hour or for the day and stand-up paddleboards (SUPs) can be rented by the hour. This can be done from beach and lifeguard staff. After rainfalls, swimming is often prohibited due to excessive bacteria. The City of Ottawa posts water quality results on its websites and signs are posted when swimming is unsafe.

Many wedding parties have their photos taken by the arched wooden bridges with weeping willows as a backdrop in the spring and summer months. Mooney's Bay is also home to Pirate Adventures, an interactive pirate-theatre cruise. Baja Burger Shack is a licensed bar and grill at Mooney's Bay. Mooney's Bay Park has been adopted by the Omicron-Pi chapter of Kappa Sigma fraternity.

== History ==
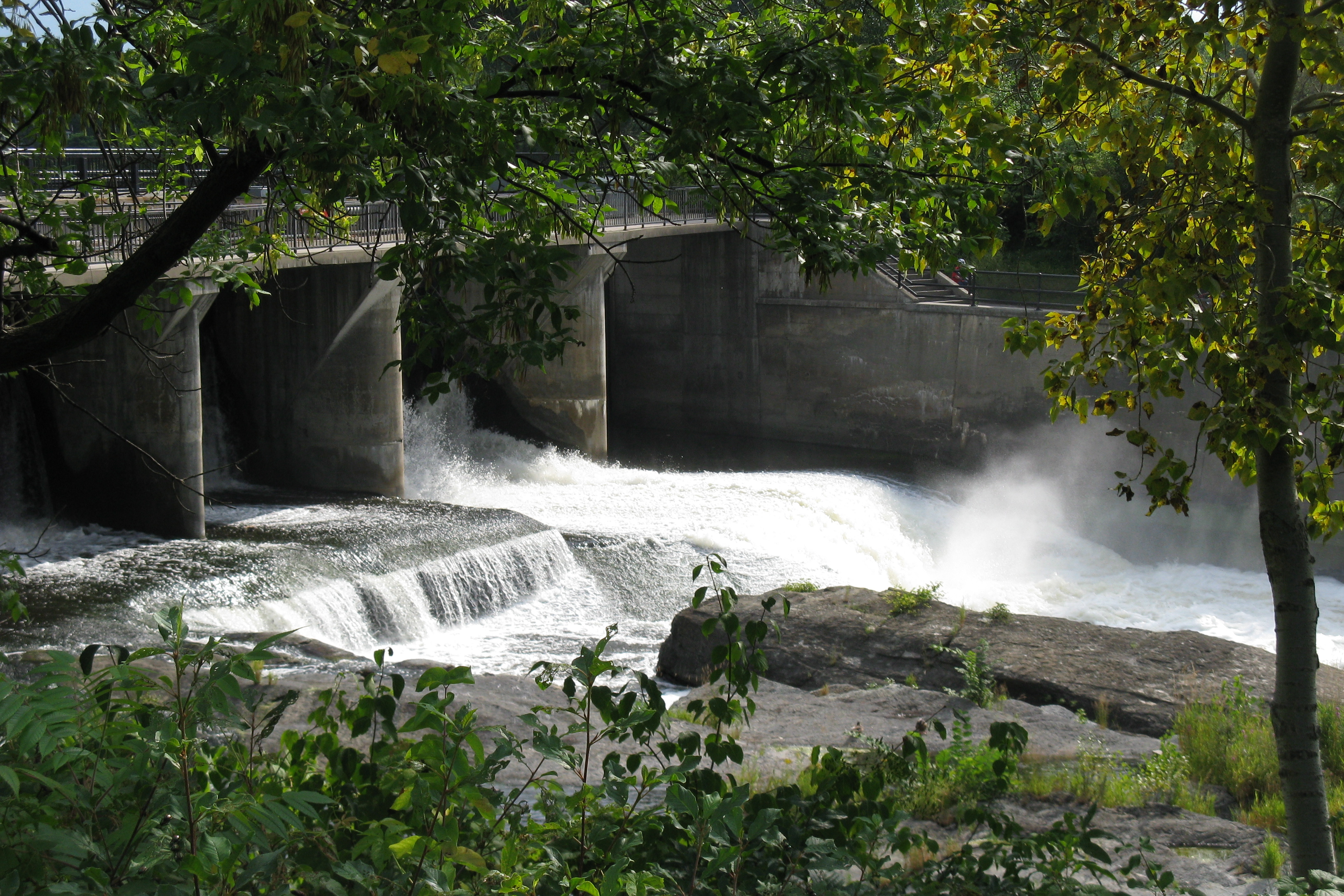
The bridge and dam at Hog's Back

Mooney's Bay is an artificial bay on the Rideau River that was created during the construction of the Rideau Canal. A dam and set of locks were constructed to bypass the rapids in the location of the Hog's Back Falls. This created a widened area of the river, suitable for boating.

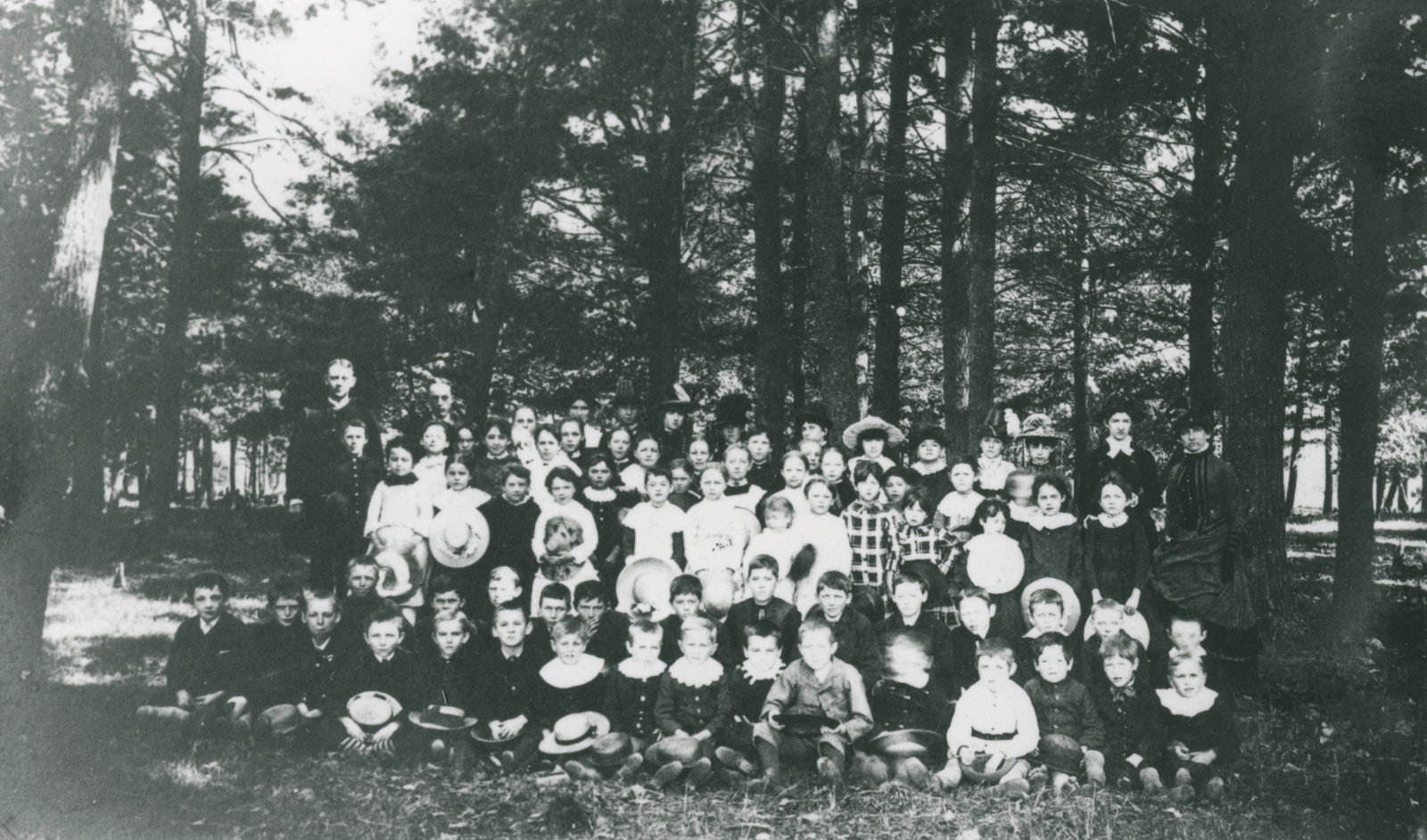
A photograph of a group of Mooney and Carty children at a picnic at the Narrows Lockstation circa 1900

Mooney's Bay was named after three generations of Mooneys who held the position of Lockmaster at Narrows Lock, covering 87 of the first 112 years of the lock's history. Michael Mooney and Michael Mooney Jr, who operated the Rideau Lock between 1856 and 1871 then passed the Lockmaster obligations onto his son from 1874 to 1894. The Mooney reign did not end there. The son of Michael Mooney Jr. and Kate Carty Mooney, Michael Edmund Mooney, temporarily took over as lockmaster for the summer of 1895. He used the name Edmund to avoid confusion with his father and grandfather, and was better known as "Ebb." Ebb was discharged late in 1896, but was reappointed as permanent lockmaster in 1897 and served until 1946. The Mooney family has deep ties throughout Ontario including Kitchener, Sudbury, Toronto, Smiths Falls and Ottawa and is also a deeply rooted military family with a rich history in the Canadian Forces. The son of Ebb and Birdie Lynch Mooney was Thomas Mooney, the first Canadian Catholic Chaplain to die in action in World War 2.
