= Green Island (Rideau River) =

Island in Ottawa, Ontario, Canada

Coordinates: 45.439922°N 75.69476°W

Green Island in Ottawa, Ontario, Canada, is an island at the junction of the Rideau River, just off Sussex Drive in Ottawa at the Rideau Falls at the confluence with the Ottawa River. It is situated near the neighbourhood of New Edinburgh.

To the west of the island is the National Research Council, and Global Affairs Canada (formerly Foreign Affairs, Trade and Development Canada); to the east is 24 Sussex Drive and the embassy of France. On either side of the falls are facilities for a hydroelectric power plant.

Down the Rideau river are the ruins of a rail bridge that once led to Ottawa's Union Station.

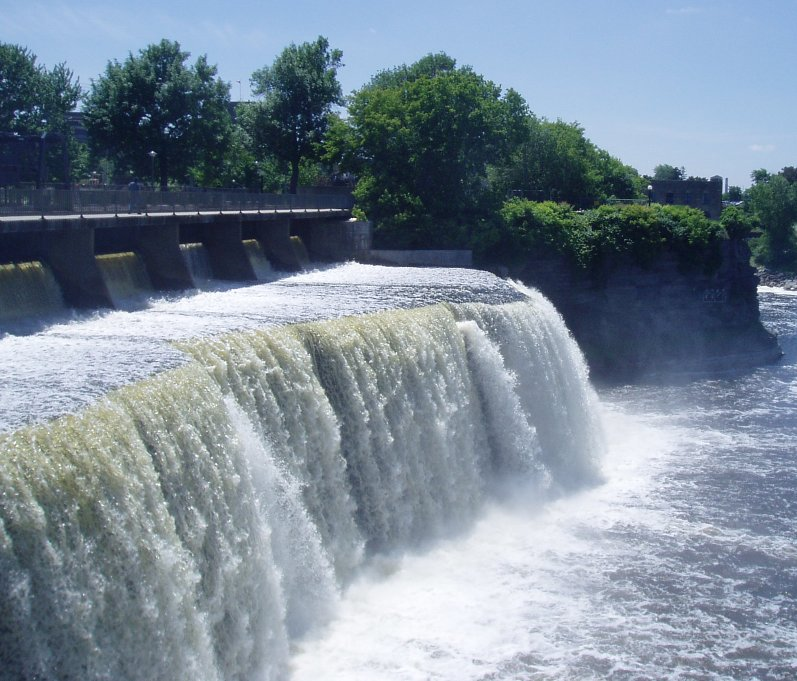
Rideau Falls, which are divided by Green Island

== Commemorations ==
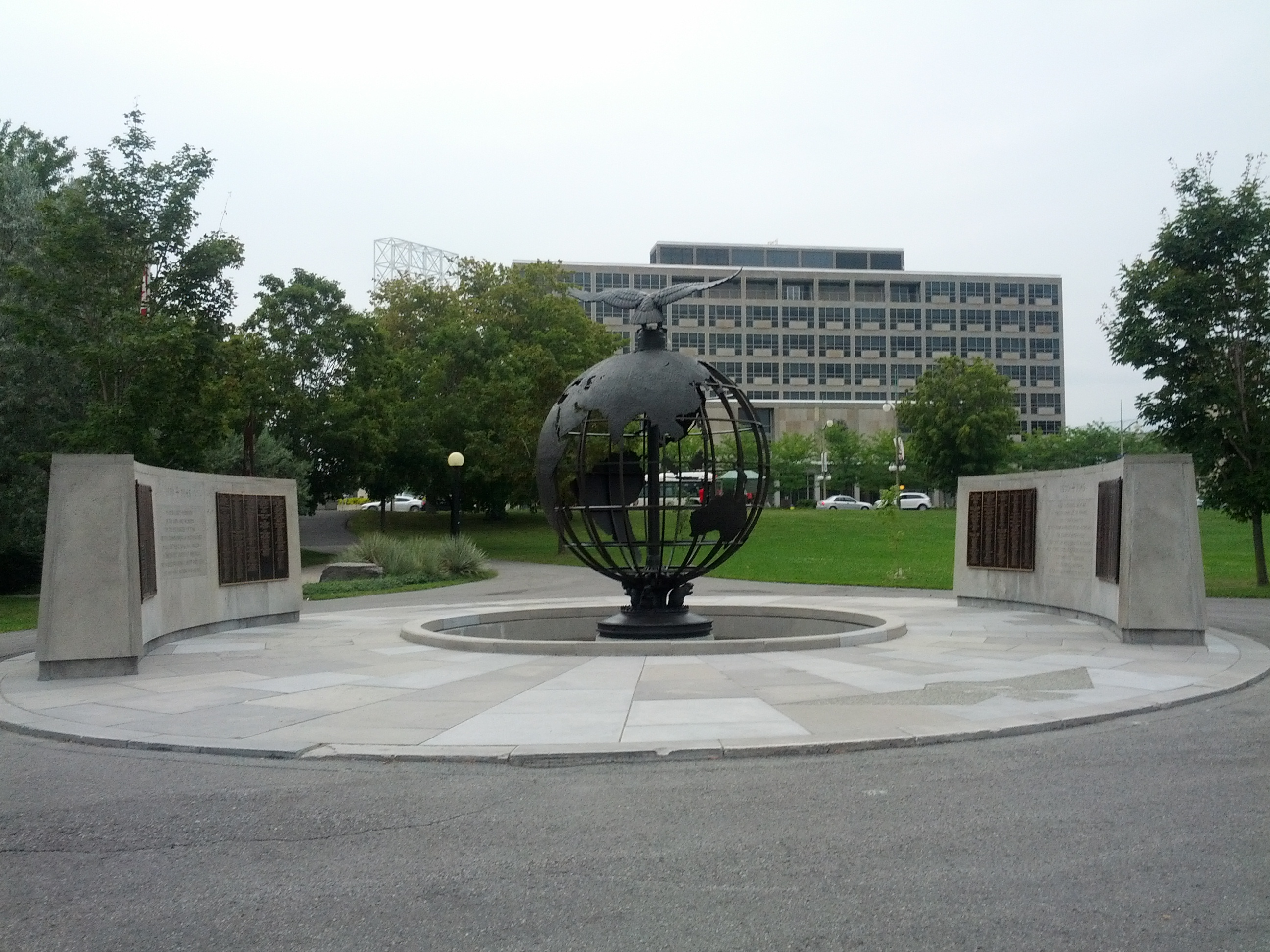
Ottawa Memorial

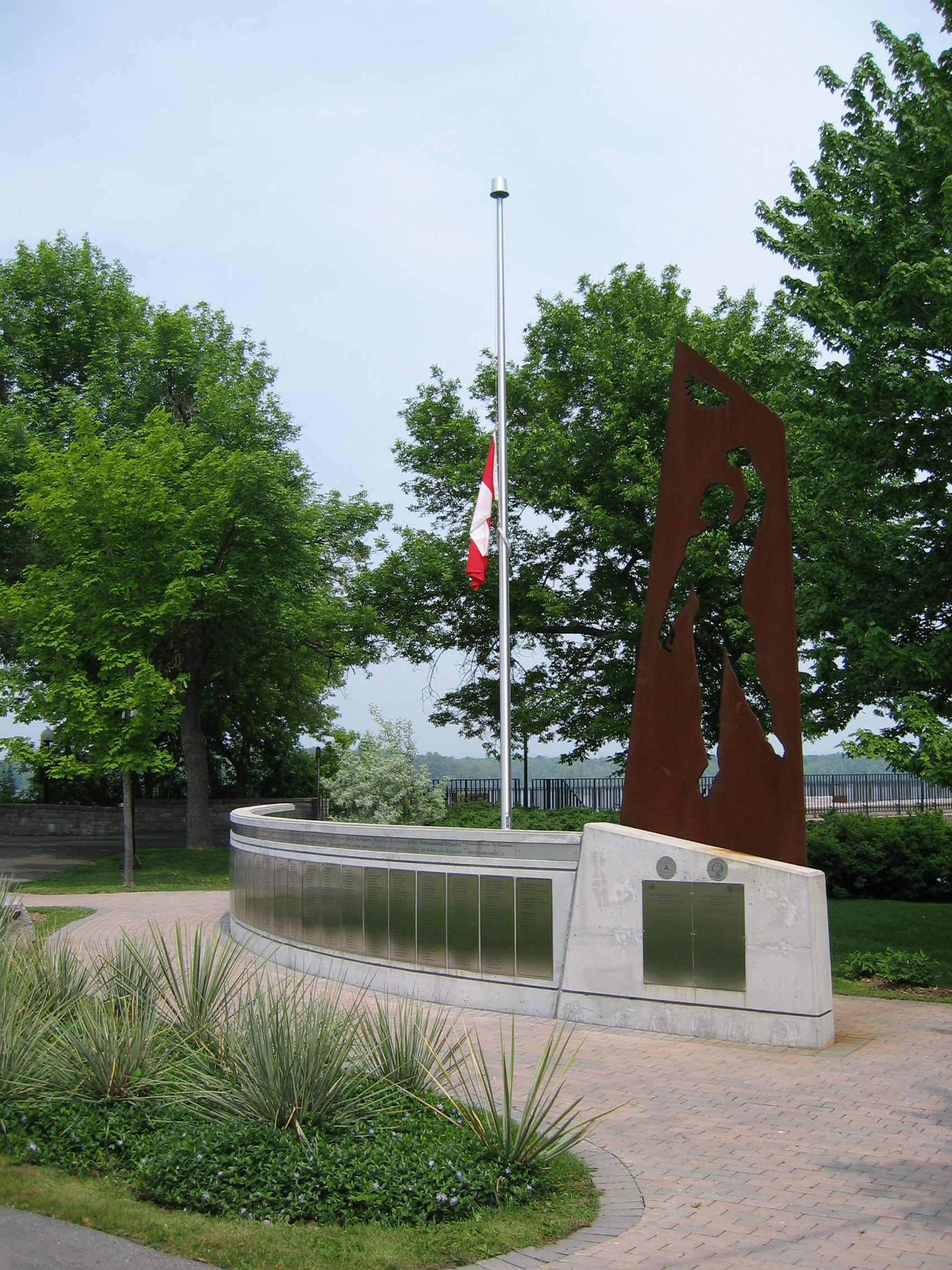
Mackenzie-Papineau Monument

Green Island has several commemorations including:

- the Mackenzie-Papineau Monument to Canadian veterans of the Spanish Civil War,
- the Ottawa Memorial was erected in the form of a huge bronze globe by the Commonwealth War Graves Commission and Public Works Canada. The memorial was unveiled by Her Majesty Queen Elizabeth II on July 1, 1959. The Ottawa Memorial commemorates approximately 800 men and women who were in active service or in training with the Commonwealth air forces in Canada, the Caribbean and the United States, who died during the Second World War. They have no known grave, or were buried at remote crash sites that are considered to be inaccessible.
- the National Artillery Monument was unveiled by Major-General Georges P. Vanier on September 21, 1959, in Major's Hill Park. The Monument was moved to Green Island in 1997 as part of the National Capital Commission’s restructuring plan. On 24 May 1998, the monument was rededicated on Green Island. On November 11 of each year, a memorial service is held at National Artillery Monument immediately following the national ceremony at the Cenotaph. A wreath is laid by the Colonel Commandant or the Director of Artillery on behalf of The Royal Regiment of Canadian Artillery.
- A sculpture of Lieutenant Colonel John McCrae by Ruth Abernethy was erected in 2015 with his dress as an artillery officer and his medical bag nearby, as he writes In Flanders Fields. The statue shows the destruction of the battlefield and, at his feet, the poppies which are a symbol of Remembrance of World War I and all armed conflict since.

== Ottawa City Hall (1958–2001) ==
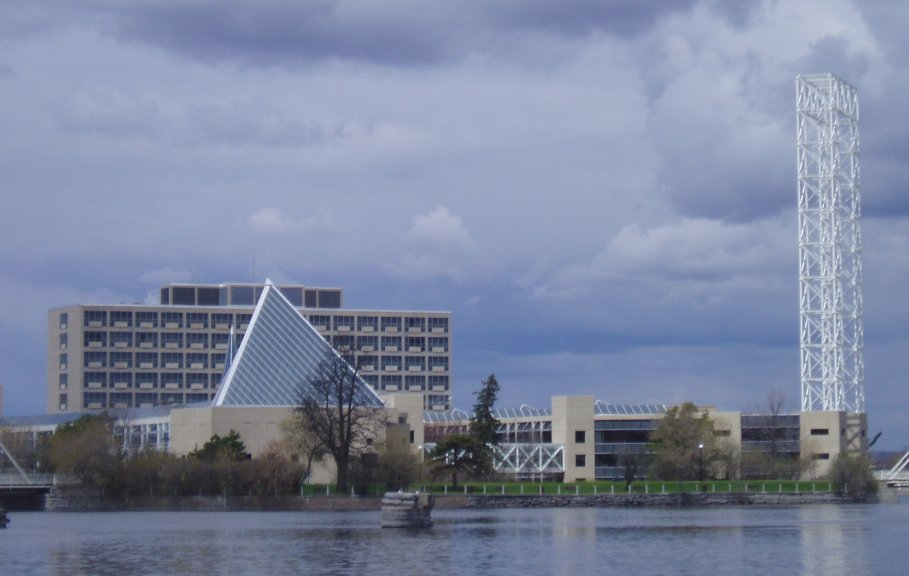
The Old City Hall on Green Island

Green Island was the location of Old City Hall, of the old city of Ottawa, before the amalgamation of the region in 2001. After considering 36 different locations, Green Island was confirmed as the new location of Ottawa City Hall on January 31, 1956. The official sod-turning ceremony was held on September 16, 1956. Construction was completed in 1958. City Council held its first meeting at the new location on July 21, 1958. Princess Margaret officially opened the stone and glass building, which featured a marble spiral staircase leading to the second floor, on August 2, 1958. This building remained Ottawa’s City Hall until municipal amalgamation came into effect on January 1, 2001. The building of an expensive addition to the city hall (designed by Moshe Safdie), the architect of the National Gallery of Canada shortly before the building was decommissioned was a source of controversy in the city.
