= Hog's Back Falls =

Artificial waterfalls in Ottawa, Canada

Coordinates: 45.371021°N 75.697024°W

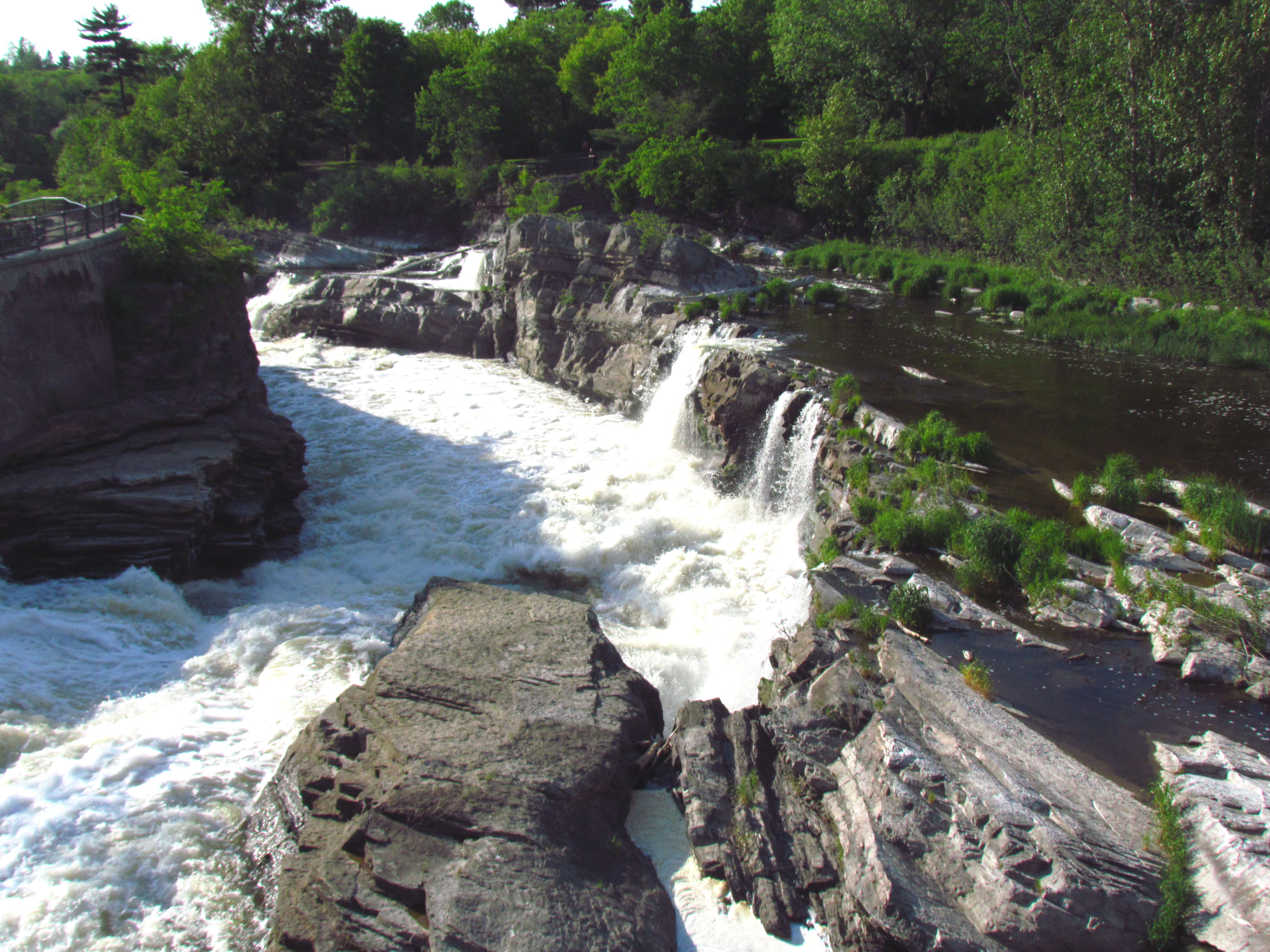
Lower falls in summer

The Hog's Back Falls, officially known as the Prince of Wales Falls, but rarely referred to by this name, are a series of artificial waterfalls on the Rideau River in Ottawa, Ontario, Canada. The falls are located just north of Mooney's Bay and the point where the Rideau Canal splits from the Rideau River.

Prior to the construction of the Rideau Canal, these were a gentle set of rapids originally known as Three Rock Rapids. The name Hog's Back came into use shortly before canal construction. Civil Engineer John MacTaggart, in 1827, described them as "a noted ridge of rocks, called the Hog’s Back, from the circumstances of raftsmen with their wares [timber rafts] sticking on it in coming down the stream." These rapids were about 600 metres (2 000 feet) in length with a drop of about 1.8 metres (6 feet). They were navigable by canoe; no portage was required.

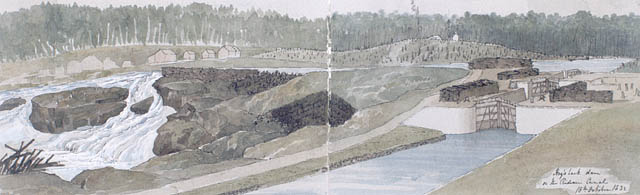
Falls and lock in 1832

As part of his concept for a slackwater navigation system, Lt. Colonel John By's design for the Rideau Canal called for a large dam to be raised in this location. It would divert water from the Rideau River into the artificially-created section of the canal leading to the Ottawa locks. It would also flood the Three Island Rapids located upstream (the head of present-day Mooney's Bay marks the foot of these rapids).

The building of this dam provided one of the greatest construction challenges (it collapsed three times during construction) of the Rideau Canal, but when completed in 1831, it flooded the Rideau River at that point by 12.5 metres (41 feet). To accommodate the natural flow of the Rideau River and to prevent damage from spring flooding, a large wastewater weir was constructed. The water from this flows through a channel that was excavated in the eastern bank of the Rideau River. This created the Hog's Back Falls that we see today.

The head of the original rapids is now buried beneath the canal dam, but the lower section of the rapids can still be seen today.

This location marks where the route of the Rideau Canal leaves the Rideau River and enters a manmade canal leading to the Ottawa locks. A series of locks lowers boats from this location to the Ottawa River.

== See also ==
- Royal eponyms in Canada
