= Rideau River =

Rideau River: Rivière Rideau (French); Pasapkedjinawong (Ojibwe)
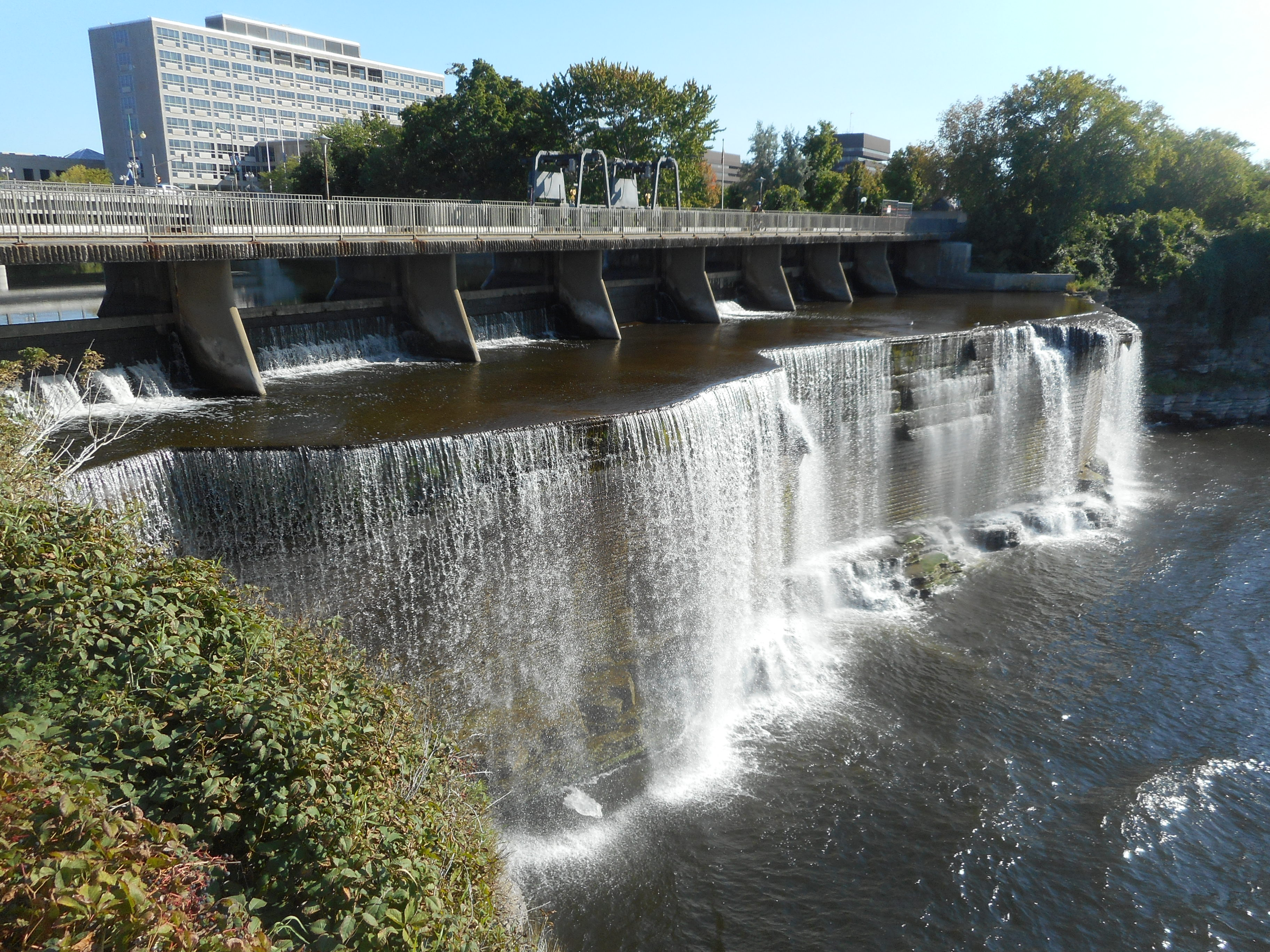
- The mouth of the Rideau River in Ottawa flowing into the Ottawa River at Rideau Falls

Location
- Country: Canada
- Province: Ontario
- Region: Eastern Ontario

Physical characteristics
- Source: Upper Rideau Lake
  - location: United Counties of Leeds and Grenville, Ontario, Canada
  - coordinates: 44.682°N 76.336°W
- Mouth: Ottawa River
  - location: City of Ottawa
  - coordinates: 45.441405°N 75.69623°W
- Length: 100 km (62 mi)
- Basin size: 4,000 km^{2} (1,500 sq mi)
- Discharge
  - location: Rideau Falls
  - average: 35 m^{3}/s (1,200 cu ft/s)

Basin features
- Progression: Ottawa River→ St. Lawrence River→ Gulf of St. Lawrence
- River system: Ottawa River drainage basin

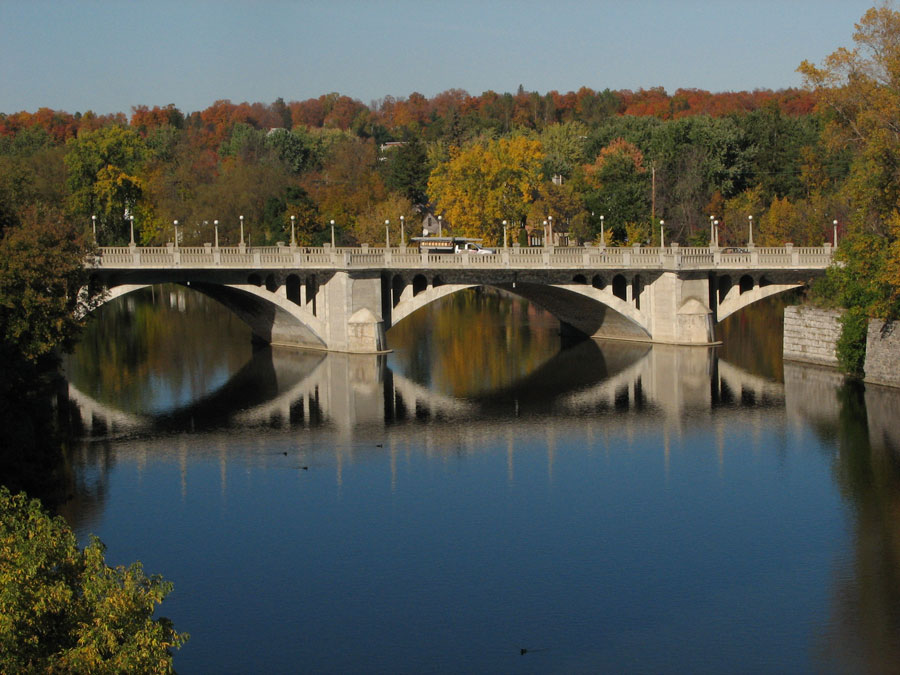
Rideau River under Cummings Bridge separating Sandy Hill from Vanier in Ottawa

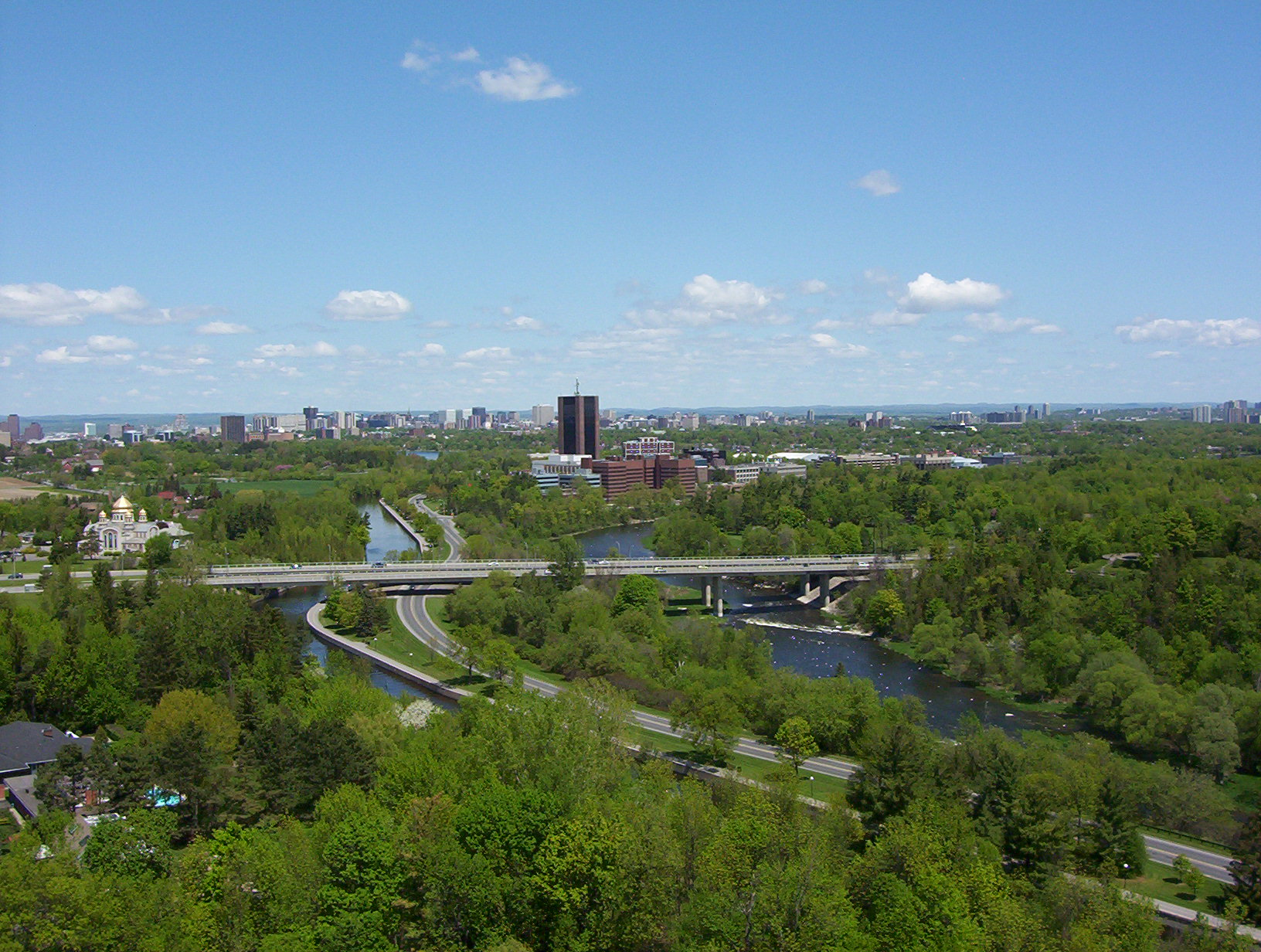
Rideau River and Rideau Canal opposite Carleton University

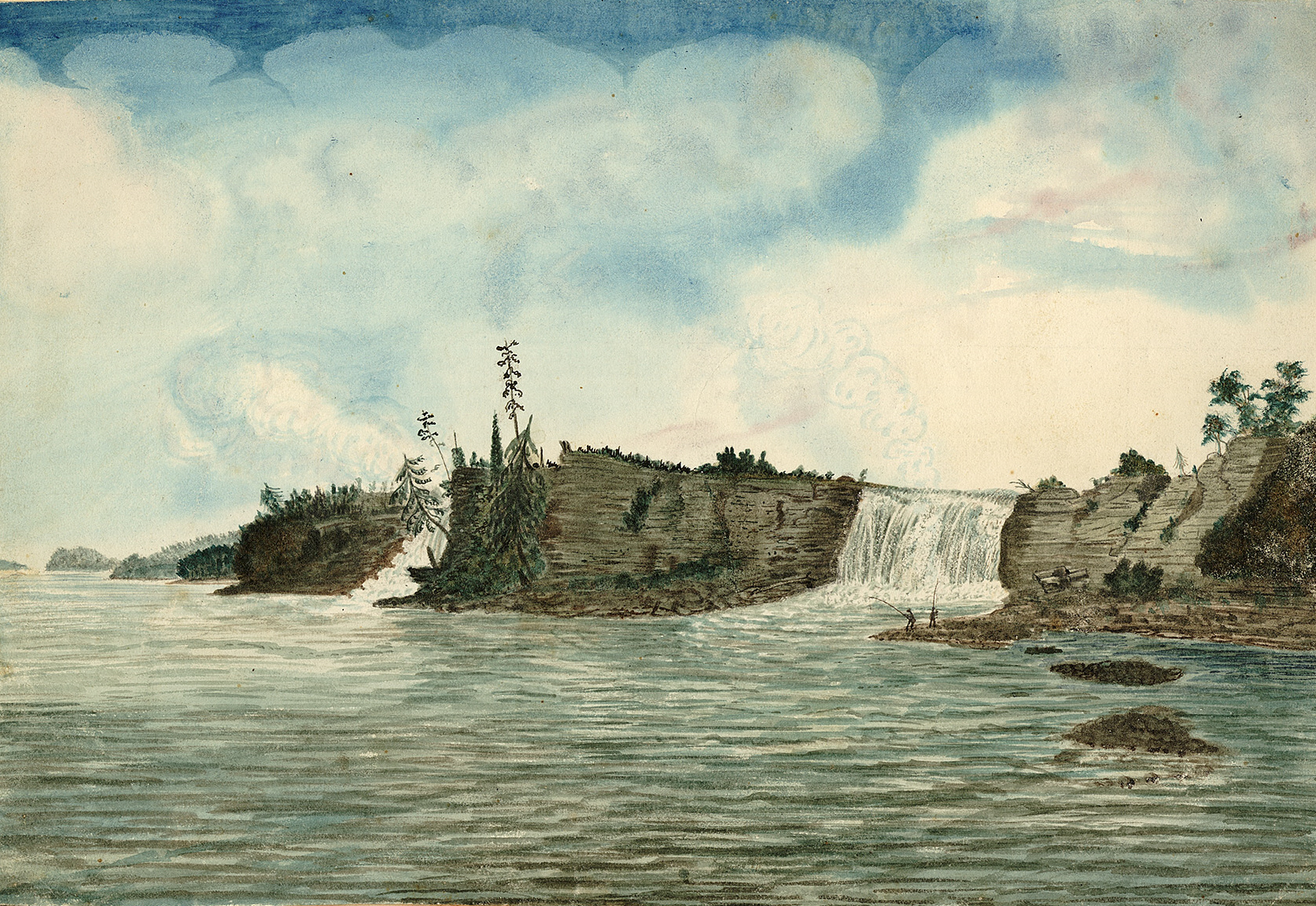
1826 painting of the Rideau Falls, where the Rideau River empties out into the Ottawa River, by Thomas Burrowes

The Rideau River (French: Rivière Rideau, Ojibwe: Pasapkedjinawong) is a river in Eastern Ontario, Canada. The river flows north from Upper Rideau Lake and empties into the Ottawa River at the Rideau Falls in Ottawa, Ontario. Its length is 146 kilometres (91 mi).

As explained in a writing by Samuel de Champlain in 1613, the river was given the name "Rideau" (French for 'curtain') because of the appearance of the Rideau Falls. The Anishinàbemowin name for the river is Pasapkedjinawong, 'the river that passes between the rocks'.

The Rideau Canal, which allows travel from Ottawa to the city of Kingston, Ontario on Lake Ontario, was formed by joining the Rideau River with the Cataraqui River. The river diverges from the Canal at Hog's Back Falls in Ottawa.

In early spring, to reduce flooding on the lower section of the river, workers from the city of Ottawa use ice blasting to clear the ice which covers the river from Billings Bridge to Rideau Falls by cutting "keys" through the ice and using explosives to break off large sheets of ice. This practice has been going on for more than 100 years.

The regulatory authority charged with protecting the Rideau River and its tributaries is the Rideau Valley Conservation Authority.

== History ==
Samuel de Champlain, who was the first European to have seen the river, named it rideau (French for 'curtain') due to the resemblance between Rideau Falls and a curtain.

In earlier times, the river was used as a transportation route between the Ottawa and Saint Lawrence River. The fertility of the lands along the banks of Rideau river attracted loyalist settlers looking for good farmlands, which led to growth of settlements in the surrounding regions. After the War of 1812, a waterway, designed by John By, was built through Rideau River connecting Kingston to Ottawa.

=== Tributaries ===
- Adrians Creek
- Duck Creek
- Tay River
- Black Creek
- Otter Creek
- Rosedale Creek
- Irish Creek
- Babers Creek
- Atkinsons Creek
- Rideau Creek
- Dales Creek
- Brassils Creek
- Murphy Drain
- Kemptville Creek
- McDermott Drain
- Cranberry Creek
- Stevens Creek
- Mud Creek
- Jock River
- Black Rapids Creek
- Nepean Creek
- Brewer Park Pond (connected via a culvert)
- Sawmill Creek

=== Communities ===
Communities along the Rideau include:

- Ottawa, Ontario
- Manotick, Ontario
- Kars, Ontario
- North Grenville, Ontario
- Merrickville, Ontario
- Smiths Falls, Ontario

=== Islands ===
- Barnes Island
- Beech Island
- Cummings Island
- Green Island
- James Island
- Kilmarnock Island
- Libby Island
- Long Island
- Maple Island
- Nicolls Island
- Porter Island
- Sanders Island

== See also ==
- Ottawa's Green spaces along the Rideau River
- List of Ontario rivers
- Royal Swans, that occupy a stretch of the river
