= List of parks in Ottawa =

This is a list of parks in the City of Ottawa, Ontario, Canada.

The City of Ottawa maintains over 1,300 parks covering about 4,300 hectares.

== Major parks ==
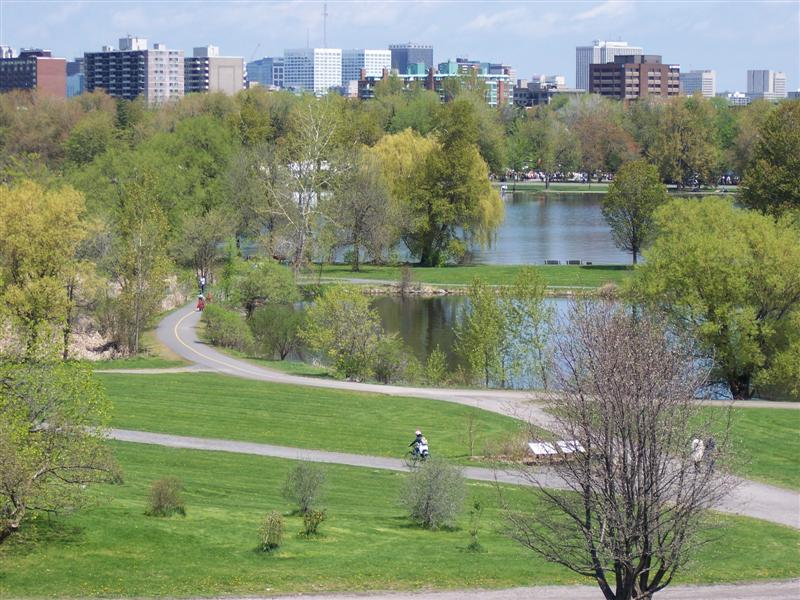
Dow's Lake

- Andrew Haydon Park
- Brewer Park
- Britannia Park
- Confederation Park
- Dow's Lake
- Hog's Back Park
- Lansdowne Park
- Macdonald Gardens
- Major's Hill Park
- Mooney's Bay Park
- Nepean Creek Park
- Rockcliffe Park
- Strathcona Park
- Vincent Massey Park
- Wesley Clover Parks

== By neighbourhood ==
=== Airport-Uplands ===
- Whisteria Park
- Windsor Park

=== Alta Vista ===
- Alta Vista Mews Park
- Alta Vista Park
- Applewood Park
- Billings Estate Museum
- Billings Park
- Canterbury Park
- Confederation Park
- Cunningham Woods
- Edgehill Park
- Faircrest Heights Park
- Grasshopper Hill/Kilborn Park
- Hawthorne Park
- John Murphy Park
- Lynda Lane Park
- Orlando Park
- Orlando Park Annex
- Playfair Park
- Pleasant Park Woods
- Rabbi Bulka Kindness Park
- Reeves Park
- Robert Andrew Russell Park
- Sharel Park
- Weston Park
- WRENS Way

=== Ashton ===
- Ashton Park

=== Barrhaven ===
- Albion Falls Park
- Andy Moffitt Trail
- Barcham Park
- Baroness Park
- Barrhaven Park
- Barrhaven Mews Park
- Berry Glen Park
- Bumett Park
- Calaveras Park
- Chapman Mills Park
- Clarity Park
- Clarke Fields Park
- Cobble Hill Park
- Cresthaven Park
- Davidson Park
- Daybreak Park
- Drumlins Park
- Dylan Way Park
- Escarpment Park
- Finchley Park
- Flanders Park
- Foot Guards Park
- Fosterbrook Park
- Fraser Fields Parkette
- Freshwater Parkette
- Furness Park
- Golflinks Park
- Gospel Oak Park
- Greenbank Park
- Greenpointe Park
- Grovehurst Park
- Gus Este Park
- Half Moon Bay Park
- Half Moon Bay District Park
- Harbour View Park
- Harthill Way Linear Park
- Hibiscus Park
- Horace Park
- Houlihan Park
- Ken Ross Park
- Kilbirnie Park
- Knowlton Park
- Lamprey Park
- Larkin Park
- Leatherleaf Park
- Malvern Park
- Maralisa Park
- McKenna Park
- Minto Recreation Park - Barrhaven
- Moloughney Park
- Mowat Farm Park
- Mulligan Park
- Neill Nesbitt Park
- North Harrow Park
- Oldfield Park
- Palmadeo Park
- Pheasant Run Park
- Redpath Park
- Regatta Park
- River Run Park
- Rodeo Park
- Rosetta Park
- South Nepean Park
- Stinson Park
- Stonebridge Trail
- Stonecrest Park
- Strandherd Park
- Strandherd Ultimate Fields
- Tierney Park
- Totteridge Park
- Tucana Park
- Utman Park
- Water Dragon Park
- Watershield Park
- Watters Woods
- W.C. Levesque Fields
- West Houlahan Park
- Weybridge Park

=== Beacon Hill North ===
- Eastvale Park
- La Verendrye Park
- Loyola Park
- Marquis Park
- Naskapi Ridge Park
- Sheffort Sports Park
- Ski Hill Park

=== Beacon Hill South ===
- Acres Park
- Appleford Park
- Elmridge Park
- Fairfield Park
- Jasmine Park
- Kinsmen Park
- Lockwood Park
- Ogilvie South Park
- Ridge Park
- Trillium Park

=== Bel-Air Heights ===
- Agincourt Park
- Ainsley Park
- Navaho Park

=== Bells Corners ===
- Arbeatha Park
- Arnold Park
- Ascot Park
- Bell Arena Park
- Dante Park
- Donoghue Memorial Park
- Entrance Park
- Florizel Park
- Forestview Park
- George Wilson Park
- Harwick Park
- Lynwood Park
- NCC Aubrey Moodie Park
- Priam Way Park
- Quinpool Park
- Trevor Park
- Westcliffe Park
- Williams Park

=== Blackburn Hamlet ===
- Agnes Purdy Park (formerly South Park)
- Bearbrook Park and Pool
- Blackburn Park
- Bush Park
- Centre Park
- Gloucester Allotment Garden
- Harold Diceman Park
- Hornets Nest Soccer Park
- Isaiah Scharfe Park
- John Kemp Park
- Joshua Bradley Park
- Keystone Park
- Michael Budd Park
- Orient Park
- Richard Dagg Park
- Tauvette Park
- Woodhill Park

=== Blossom Park ===
- Aladdin Park
- Athans Park
- Baden Park
- East Bridle Path Park
- Emerald Woods Park
- Fawn Meadow Park
- North Sawmill Creek Park
- Pine Grove Park
- Russell Boyd Park
- Sawmill Creek Park
- Sieveright Park
- South Sawmill Creek Park
- Trappers Park
- West Bridle Path Park

=== Carleton Heights ===
- Carleton Heights Park

=== Carlington ===
- Alexander Park
- Bellevue Manor Park
- Carlington Park
- Harrold Place Park
- Meadowvale Terrace Park
- Raven Park

=== Carlsbad Springs ===
- Harkness Park

=== Carp ===
- Carp Memorial Hall
- Diefenbunker Baseball Diamond
- Doug Rivington Park
- Hidden Lake Park
- Huntley Community Centre
- Huntley Curling Club
- Jensen Court Park
- Langstaff Drive Soccer Fields
- Langstaff Park
- W. Erskine Johnson Arena
- West Carleton War Memorial

=== Carson Grove ===
- Bathgate Park
- Carson Grove Park
- Dr. John Hopps Park
- Gloucester Hydro Park
- LeBoutillier Park
- Metz Park
- Whiterock Park

=== Centretown ===
- Arlington Park
- Dundonald Park
- Golden Triangle Park
- Jack Purcell Park
- Lisgar Parkette
- McNabb Park
- Nepean Place
- Minto Park
- St. Luke's Park

=== Centretown West ===
- Chaudière Park
- Dalhousie South Park
- McCann Park
- Piazza Dante Park
- Plouffe Park
- Primrose Park

=== Civic Hospital ===
- Ev Tremblay Park
- Fairmont Park
- Reid Park

=== Cyrville ===
- Cummings Park
- Ken Steele Park
- Marchand Park
- Ogilvie North Park

=== Downtown Ottawa ===
- Bronson Park
- Confederation Park
- Garden of the Provinces and Territories
- Marion Dewar Plaza

=== Eastway Gardens ===
- Cecil Morrison Park

=== Ellwood ===
- Frank J. Licari Park (formerly Ridgemont Park, renamed in 2010)
- Ledbury Park
- Walkley/Albion Park

=== Fitzroy Harbour ===
- Bairds Park
- Egbert Reitsma Parkette
- Fitzroy Provincial Park
- Open Space (91 & 95 Chats Rd)
- Fitzroy Harbour Community Centre and Campbell Bicentennial Park
- River Park

=== Foster Farm ===
- Barwell Park
- Dumaurier Park
- Ruth Wildgen Park

=== Galetta ===
- Galetta Community Centre

=== The Glebe ===
- Brown's Inlet Park
- Capital Park
- Central Park
- Chamberlain Park
- Commissioners Park
- Glebe Memorial Park
- Lansdowne Park
- Lionel Britton Park
- Patterson's Creek Park
- Senator Eugene Forsey Park
- Sylvia Holden Park

=== Greely ===
- Andy Shields Park
- Edge Hill Park
- Ridgemont Park

=== Heron Gate ===
- Anne Lacombe Park
- Fairlea Park
- Heatherington Park
- Heron-Walkley Park
- Sandalwood Park

=== Heron Park ===
- Brookfield Park
- Bruce Timmermans Park
- Heron Park
- Kaladar Park

=== Hintonburg ===
- Armstrong Park
- Bayview Friendship Park
- Hintonburg Park
- McCormick Park
- Parkdale Park
- Stirling-Carruthers Park

=== Hunt Club Estate ===
- Cahill Park
- Paul Landry Park

=== Hunt Club Woods ===
- McCarthy Park
- Uplands Park

=== Kanata ===
==== Glen Cairn ====
- Beaton Park
- Clarence Maheral Park
- Dog Bone Park
- Glen Cairn Community Centre / Morrena Park
- Gowrie Park
- Graham Ball Softball Diamond
- Hope Cloutier Park
- Jack Charron Arena
- Kincardine Park (Westcreek 1)
- Kristina Kiss Park
- Nairn Park (Westcreek 2)
- Parkland (58 Castle Glen Cres)
- Parkland (Trans Canada Trail)
- Ravine Park
- Rickey Place Park
- Searbrooke Park

==== Katimavik-Hazeldean ====
- Beaufort Park
- Byrd Park
- Cattail Creek Park
- Davis Park
- Dorey Park
- Dunlop Park
- Escarpment Park (Chimo)
- Gesner Court Park
- Glen Cairn Reservoir (Forest)
- Hayward Park
- Hazeldean Woods Park (Tamblin Park)
- Hewitt Park
- Irwin Gate Park
- Kanata Leisure Centre and Wave Pool
- Katimavik Woods
- Katimavik Woods Park North
- Larsen Park
- McGibbon Park
- Parkland (16 Curan St)
- Parkland (21 Lombard Dr)
- Parkland (491 Pickford Dr)
- Pickford Park
- Rowe Park
- Sewell Park
- Shearer Park
- Stonegate Park
- Walter Baker Park
- Watt's Creek Park
- Young's Pond Park

=== Leslie Park ===
- Brucelands Park
- Leslie Park
- Valleystream East Park

=== Lindenlea ===
- Lindenlea Park

=== Lower Town ===
- Besserer Park
- Bingham Park
- Bordeleau Park
- Cathcart Park
- Champagne Bath
- Cumberland Park
- Jules Morin Park
- Linear Park
- MacDonald Gardens Park
- Majors Hill Park
- Ottawa Lowertown Community Centre and Pool
- Ottawa Rowing Club Park
- Porter Island
- Raphael Brunet Park
- Rose Park
- Routhier Community Centre

=== Manotick ===
- A.Y. Jackson Park
- Centennial Park
- Chris Bracken Park
- David Bartlett Park
- George McLean Park
- Hilltop Park
- Long Island Aquatic Club South River Drive Park
- Long Island Road Park
- Scharf Park
- Van Vliet Park
- West River Drive Park
- Whitewood Avenue Park

=== Mechanicsville ===
- Laroche Park

=== Metcalfe ===
- Eldon Craig Park
- Joe Rowan Park
- Mckendry Park
- Van Rens Park

=== New Edinburgh ===
- New Edinburgh Park
- Rideau Falls Park
- Stanley Park

=== North Gower ===
- Alfred Taylor Recreation Facility
- Craighurst Drive Park
- Edward Craig Park
- Edward Kidd Parkette
- Farmstead Ridge Park
- Ferguson Pratt Park
- Four Corners Plaza
- Horace Seabrook Park
- Lenida Drive Park
- Meadowbrook Park
- Russvern Park

=== Old Ottawa East ===
- Ballantyne Park
- Brantwood Park
- Montgomery Memorial Park
- Robert F. Legget Park
- Springhurst Park

=== Old Ottawa South ===
- Anniversary Park
- Brewer Park
- Brighton Beach Park
- Linda Thom Park
- Osborne Park
- Windsor Park

=== Orleans ===
==== Cardinal Creek ====
- Cardinal Creek Community Park
- Cassia Circle Park
- Glandriel Park
- Pine Vista Park
- Valin Park #2

==== Chateauneuf ====
- Barnabé Park
- Barrington Park
- Bilberry Creek Valley (part)
- Cathedral Park
- Cedar Mills Park
- Champagne Park
- Delorme Park
- Garneau Park
- Laurier Carrière Park
- Marcel Bériault Park
- Roy Park
- St. François Park

==== Fallingbrook ====
- Apollo Crater Park
- Caserta Park
- Charlemagne Park
- Des Pionniers Park
- Fallingbrook Park
- Frenette Park
- Gardenway Park
- Linda Dunn Park
- Marcel Lalande Park
- Princess Louise Park
- Ray Friel Recreation Complex and Park
- South Fallingbrook Community Centre and Park
- Talcy Park
- Varennes Park
- Watters Park

==== Petrie Islands ====
- Grandmaître Ecological Reserve
- Petrie Island Park
- Stuemer Park

==== Queenswood Heights ====
- Bilberry Creek Valley (part)
- Cardinal Farms Park
- Hermas Saumur Family Forest
- Kinsella Park
- Mayfair Park
- Queenswood Heights Centennial Park
- Queenswood Ridge Park
- Ravine Park
- Yves Richer Park

=== Piperville ===
- Ludger Landry Park

=== Qualicum-Graham Park ===
- Mohawk Park
- Nanaimo Park
- Okanagan Park
- Valleystream Tennis Club and Park

=== Rideauview ===
- Rideauview Park

=== Riverside Park ===
- Arnott Park
- Ernie Calcutt Park
- Fielding Park
- Flannery Green
- Geoff Wightman Park
- Linton Park
- Marble Park
- Mooney's Bay Park
- Otterson Park
- Paget Park
- Pauline Vanier Park
- Stanstead Park

=== Riverside South ===
- Atrium Park
- Boothfield Park
- Claudette Cain Park
- Chorus Park
- Earl Armstrong Road - North Woods
- Four Seasons Park
- Hawkeswood Park
- Honey Gables Park
- Island in Rideau River
- Jeffrey Armstrong Memorial Park
- Joan O'Malley Park
- Memorial Grove Park
- Mosquito Creek Corridor
- Mosquito Creek Park
- Mosquito Creek Valley at Limebank Road
- Mountain Meadows Park
- Nimiq Park
- Ottertail Woods
- Owl Valley Park / Shoreline Park
- Rideau View Park
- River's Bend Park
- Serenade Park
- Spratt Park
- Summerhill Park
- Upper Mosquito Creek
- Whooping Crane Park
- Wolf Point Woods

=== Riverview ===
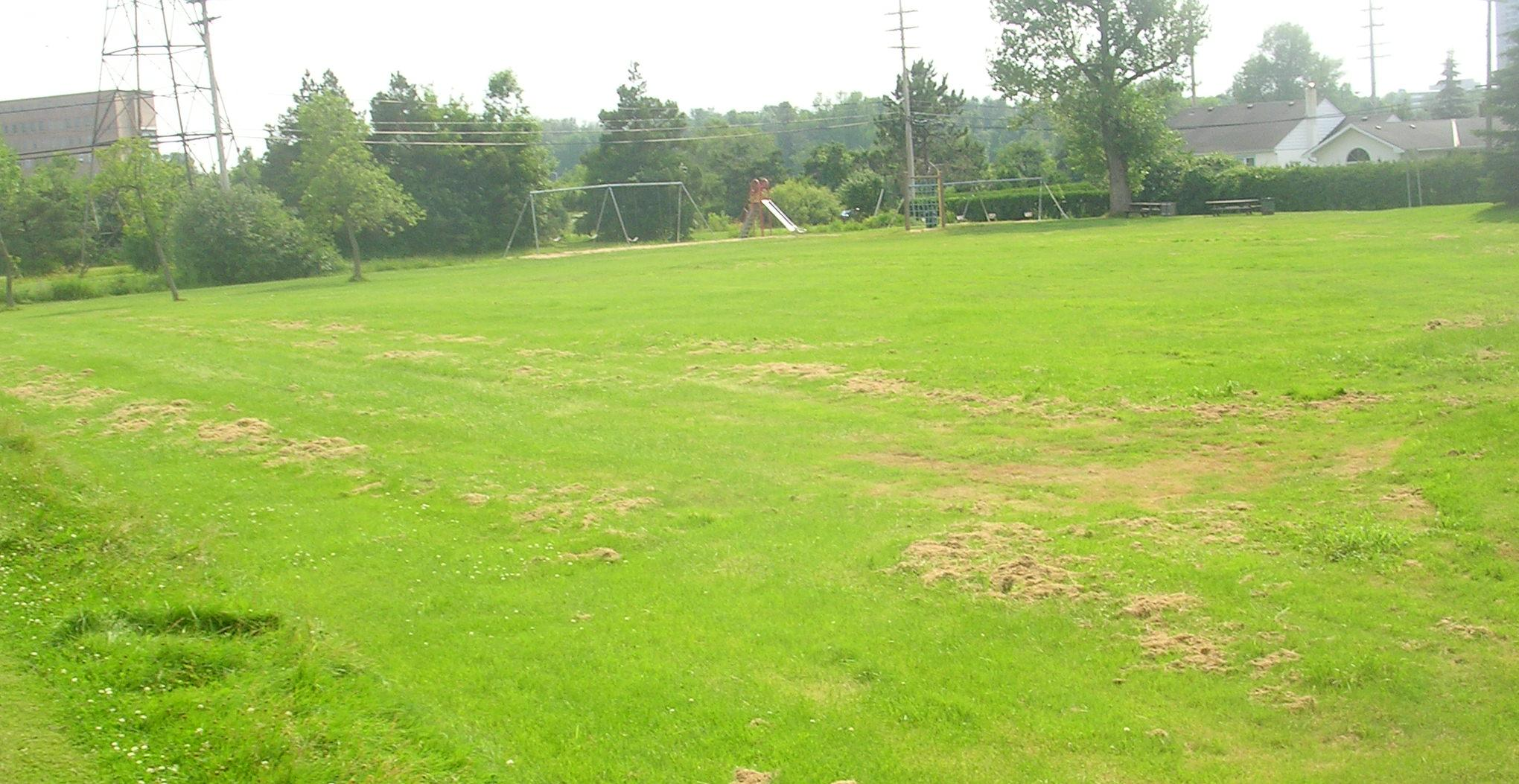
Riverview Park

- Alda Burt Park
- Balena Park
- Coronation Park
- Dale Park
- Hutton Park
- Rideau Veteran's Home Memorial Park
- Riverview Park

=== Rothwell Heights ===
- Birdland Park
- Combermere Park
- Kindle Court Park
- Nivens Woods Park
- Quarry Park

=== Sandy Hill ===
- Annie Pootoogook Park (formerly Sandy Hill Park, re-named in 2021)
- Besserer Park
- Cindy Mitchell Park
- Dutchy's Hole Park
  - Robinson Field
- Ogilvy Square
- Sandy Hill Arena
- Sir Wilfrid Laurier Park
- St. Germain Park
- Strathcona Park

=== Sarsfield ===
- Yves Chénier Park

=== Sheffield Glen ===
- Sheffield Glen Park

=== South Keys ===
- R. George Pushman Park

=== Stittsville ===
- Abbott-Iber Woodlot
- Albert Argue Wood Park
- Alexander Grove Park
- Alfred McCoy Park
- Amberway Park
- Amberwood Pathway
- Bandmaster Park
- Banyon Park
- Bell Park
- Blackstone Park
- Brigatine Park
- Bryanstone Park
- Bryanston Gate Park
- Campobello Park
- CARDELREC Recreation Complex
- Coyote Run Park
- Crantham Park
- Crossing Bridge Park
- Deer Run Park
- Eaglehead Park
- Fernbank Wetlands
- Forest Creek Park
- Fred Mill Creek Park
- Fringewood Park
- Healey's Heath Park
- Hopetown Park
- Howard A. Maguire Park
- Joe Lewis Park
- Johnswoods Street Linear Park
- Kavanagh Green
- Kemp Woodland
- Kittiwake Park
- Ladybird Park
- Laumann Park
- Maestro Park
- Maloja Park
- Mark Yakabuski Park
- Mary Durling Park
- Par-La-Ville Park
- Paul Lindsay Park
- Pine Bluff Park
- Pioneer Plains Park
- Poole Creek Park
- Pretty Street Community Centre
- Putney Woodland Park
- Ralph Street Park
- Rosehill Park
- Rouncey Park
- Rubicon Park
- Slate Park
- Stitt Street Park
- Sugar Creek Park
- Sunray Park
- Sweetnam Park
- Tempest Park
- Timbermere Park
- Traditions Park
- Traditions Wootlot
- Trustee M. Curry Park
- Upcountry Park
- Upper Poole Creek Wetland
- Village Square Park
- Westridge Park
- William Bradley Park
- W.J. Bell Rotary Peace Park
- Wyldewood Park

=== Trend-Arlington ===
- Arlington Woods Park
- Burnford Park
- George Brancato Park
- Trend Park
- Trend-Arington Park

=== Vanier ===
- Carillon Park
- Emond Park
- Janeville Park
- Julien Park
- Kingsview Park
- Kiwanis Park
- Lawson Park
- Marier Avenue Park
- Nault Park
- Optimiste Park
- Richelieu Park
- River Road Park, Riverain Parc
- St. Laurent Park

=== Vars ===
- Alcide Trudeau Park
- Cassandra Park

=== Village Green ===
- Alexander Dunn Park
- Billy Bishop Park
- Ed Hollyer Park
- Robert Gray Park
- Village Green Memorial Park

=== Wellington Village ===
- Fisher Park
- Parkdale Park

=== Westboro ===
- Byron Tramway Park
- Champlain Park
- Clare Gardens Park
- Hampton Park
- Heather Crowe Park
- Iona Park
- Lion's Park
- Mahoney Park
- McKellar Park
- Riverside Terrace Park
- Roy Duncan Park
- Tillbury Park
- Westboro Kiwanis Park

== Park-like ==
- Capital Pathway
- The Central Experimental Farm
- Greenbelt
- Parliament Hill's centre lawn

== See also ==
- List of attractions in Ottawa
- List of designated heritage properties in Ottawa
- List of National Historic Sites of Canada in Ottawa
