= Sawmill Creek =

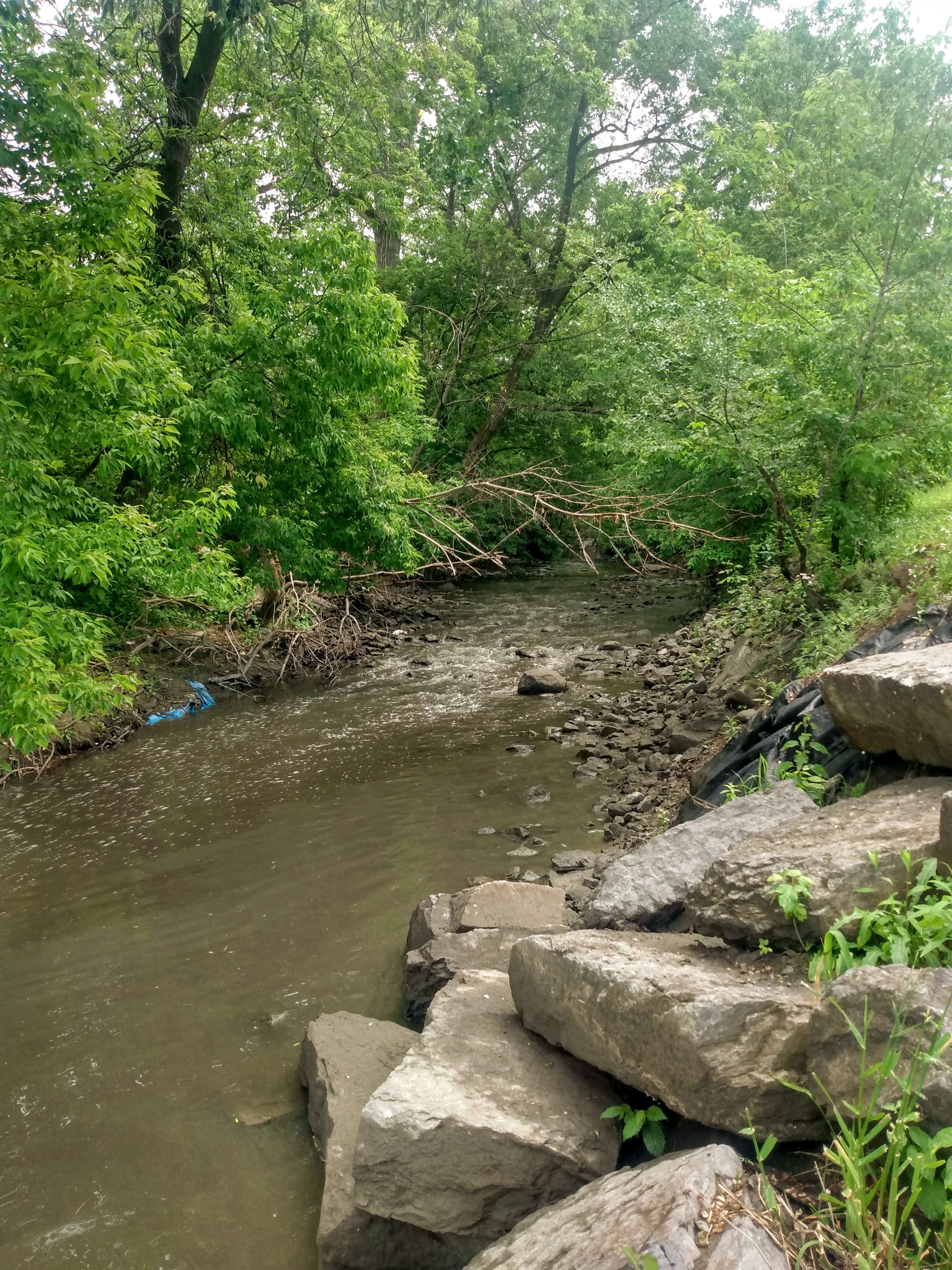
- Mouth of Sawmill Creek

- Location within Southern Ontario

Location
- Country: Canada
- Province: Ontario
- Municipality: Ottawa

Physical characteristics
- Source
  - location: Uplands
  - coordinates: 45°19′58″N 75°38′39″W
  - elevation: 100m
- Mouth: Rideau River
  - location: Near Billings Bridge
  - coordinates: 45°23′25″N 75°40′37″W
  - elevation: 56m
- Length: 11km
- Basin size: 20.73 km^{2}.
- Depth
  - maximum: 8ft

Basin features
- Tributaries
  - left: Proposal Pond, Wendy Stewart Pond

Sawmill Creek is a creek located in Ottawa, Ontario, Canada that is a tributary of the Rideau River. It rises in the wetlands south and southwest of the community of Blossom Park in the Ottawa Greenbelt, specifically south of Lester Road. It flows roughly north by northwest through Blossom Park, and the neighbourhood of South Keys, through the McCarthy Woods, and then separates the neighbourhood of Riverside Park on the west from the neighbourhoods of Ellwood and Heron Park on the east, before entering the Rideau River at Billings Bridge, near the intersection of Bank Street and Riverside Drive.

== Physiology ==
The creek's watershed is mainly marine clay plains with sand and rock ridges. 29% of the creek's substrate is clay, 21% is sand, while equal amounts (17%) are either cobble or silt.

Since the creek runs primarily through an urban environment, only 28% of its course remains natural, while 16% has been altered moderately, and 56% has been "highly altered".

== Fauna ==
Birds found in the area around the creek include the black-capped chickadee, bluejay, Canada goose, cardinal, catbird, cedar waxwing, crow, downy woodpecker, goldfinch, grackle, great blue heron, grosbeaks, gull, hawks, other herons, killdeer, kingfisher, mallard, ovenbird, owls, pigeon, red-winged blackbird, robin, song sparrow, other sparrows, swallow, thrushes, and woodpecker. Mammals include beaver, coyote, deer, grey squirrel, groundhog, muskrat, raccoon, red squirrel, skunk and vole. Reptiles and amphibians include bullfrog, green frog and leopard frog. Insects and other animals include bivalves, crayfish, isopods, leeches, water striders, admiral butterfly, bluets, bumblebees, cicada, ebony jewelwing, mosquitoes, snails, spiders, and wasps. Fish include banded killifish, blacknose dace, bluegill, bluntnose minnow, brassy minnow, brook stickleback, central mudminnow, common shiner, Cottus, creek chub, Cyprinid, Etheostoma, fathead minnow, golden shiner, logperch, longnose dace, mottled sculpin, muskellunge, northern redbelly dace, pearl dace, pumpkinseed, rock bass, smallmouth bass, spottail shiner, walleye and white sucker.

== History ==
The mouth of the creek was once about 300m further upstream on the Rideau River, but was diverted to its present location after 1958 to bring an end to spring flooding in the area.

In 1970, a small amount of oil pollution was found in the creek. Oil pollution continued to be a problem for the creek into the 1990s, its source unknown.

High amounts of fecal contamination in the creek was blamed for the closure of three Rideau River beaches downstream (at Brantwood, Brighton and Strathcona Parks) in 1973. Today, there remain no public beaches on the Rideau downstream from the mouth of Sawmill Creek. Some of the contamination came from septic tanks from homes in Blossom Park, which had been deteriorating, resulting in sewage seeping into the groundwater. Further downstream between Heron and Walkley Roads, cross connections caused sanitary outlets to dump raw sewage into storm sewers, which then entered the creek.

Construction of Ottawa's Southeast Transitway in the early 1990s resulted in the altering of the creek within a three kilometre stretch where the Transitway runs parallel to the creek. The area was chosen by Regional Municipality of Ottawa–Carleton council as a rapid-transit site in 1978, and was opposed at the time by environmentalists who feared the creek would be filled in, and the ecological integrity of the creek would be destroyed.

In 1995, a tributary of the creek called Cahill Creek was diverted into an underground pipe upon the construction of the South Keys Shopping Centre. This alteration destroyed a fish habitat, forcing the mall's developers to construct a spawning fish bed for walleye at the mouth of Sawmill Creek.
