= Billings Bridge =

Bridge in Ottawa, Canada

Coordinates: 45.3892°N 75.6778°W

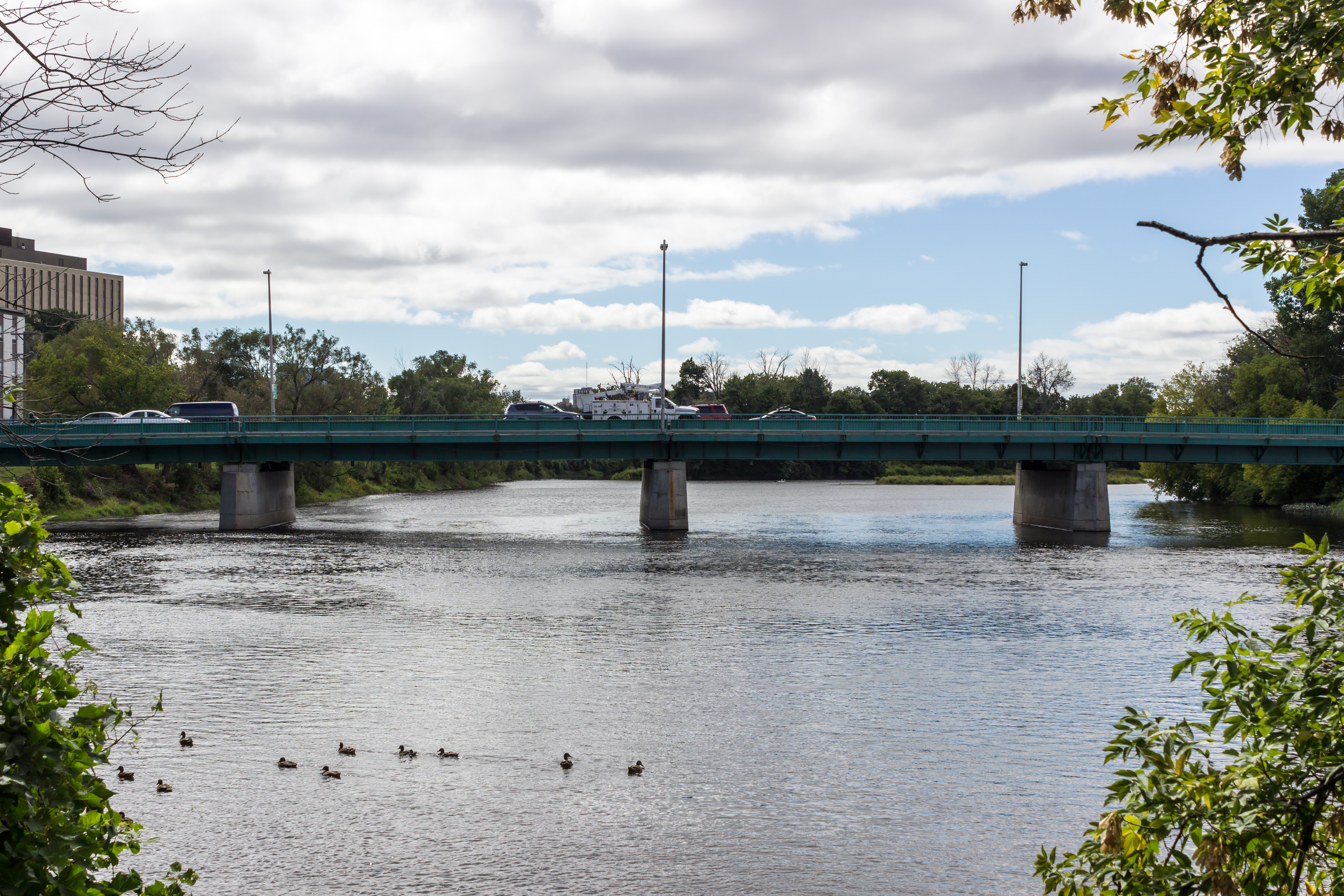
The bridge today

Billings Bridge is a bridge over the Rideau River in Ottawa. Bank Street passes over the river by way of this bridge. The bridge was named after Braddish Billings, who settled in this area and established a farm nearby in 1812. The first bridge, originally called Farmers Bridge, was built over the river here in 1830. The current bridge was built in 1916.

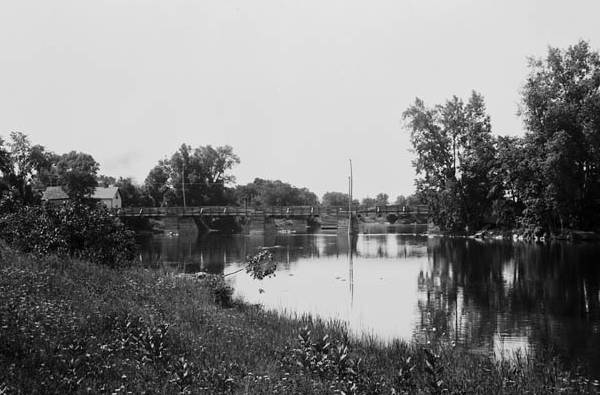
Older bridge over Rideau River at Billings Bridge Source: William James Topley/Library and Archives Canada/PA-009204

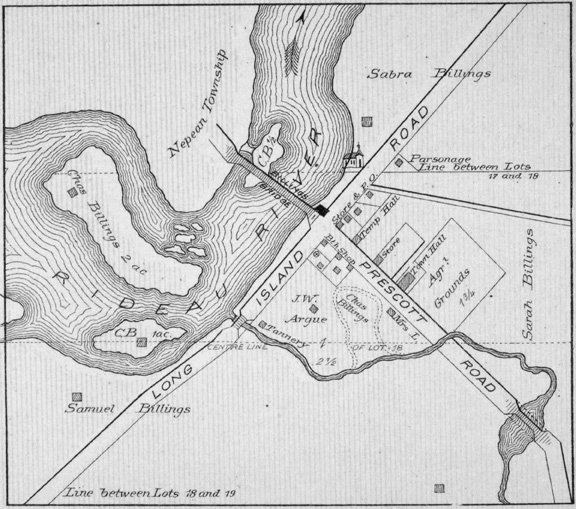
Map of Billings Bridge c.1879 Source: Illustrated Historical Atlas of the County of Carleton inc. City of Ottawa

Billings Bridge also referred to a village, located south of the river near the bridge, which became part of the city of Ottawa in 1950. The area, now an Ottawa neighbourhood, is still referred to as Billings Bridge.

== History ==
=== Early days ===
In the early 19th century, the Ottawa area was sparsely settled by Europeans. In 1783, a large tract of land including what is now Billings Bridge was purchased from the local aboriginal nations as part of the Crawford Purchase. First named in Lunenburg District in 1788, the area became part of Township B in 1792. In 1793, the township was renamed Gloucester Township, after Prince William Frederick, Duke of Gloucester and Edinburgh and included in Dundas County. Billings Bridge was not yet settled in 1800 when Russel County was established and Gloucester Township incorporated into it.

Braddish Billings arrived from Brockville in 1812 and cut out a farm on the Rideau River at the present-day Billings Bridge. The area was widely forested at the time and the early British settlement was focused on subsistence farming, as had Iroquois settlement elsewhere in the Ottawa Valley. The following year he married Lamira Dow of Merrickville and returned with her.

Gloucester Township was incorporated in the Ottawa District in 1816. The Billings Bridge area slowly grew with the progressive arrival of settlers, including friends and family of Billings. In 1823, Braddish Billings built a sawmill on a creek running through his property, near today's Bank Street. This creek remains known as Sawmill Creek.

Settlement accelerated with the development of Bytown and the Rideau Canal.

=== Billings Bridge ===
The first bridge was built by Billings across the Rideau River at Bank Street in 1831. Originally called Farmers Bridge, by 1859 both the bridge and the community became commonly known as Billings Bridge.

This early bridge was washed out and rebuilt in 1847 and again in 1862. Bridges at the time were more vulnerable to this, as they only had a clearance of about 1m above the water level. The concrete central span of the bridge collapsed 21 March 1913. Construction of a new bridge began in 1914. It was inaugurated 2 September 1915. The ceremony was conducted on the North bank of the river. The mayor of Ottawa then drove across the bridge, turned around without pause and drove straight back into town.

=== Local businesses ===
The community around the bridge and the Billings estate slowly grew over the years. Billings Bridge extended along the Metcalfe Road (now Bank Street) from the Bridge, up to the plateau at the top the hill.

There were several businesses in Billings Bridge. In the late 1800s, the Ottawa Brick and Terra Cotta Co. Ltd. brickyard opened at the foot of the hill, to the east of Sawmill Creek, on 58 acres of land now occupied by the RA Centre. In 1912, Alex Merkley, who ran a lumber and brick business with his brothers took over management of the brickyard. In 1924 (or possibly 1919), he and his brothers Duncan and Willie bought out the brickyard. Clay used in the brickworks was originally drawn from the property but later had to be brought in from the outside. The business was run by sons Cameron and Hugh Merkley from 1947 until the factory closed in 1958, following expropriation by the Federal Government in 1954.

In the wake of the 1905 Russian Revolution, Lazarus Greenberg, his wife Esther Bencher and their three children left Belarus for Canada. Before the First World War, they settled in Billings Bridge and opened a general store on the Metcalfe Road near the rail tracks. The Greenbergs were the first Jewish family to settle in the village of Billings Bridge. There followed several other families, some related to them, which became the core of the Billings Bridge Jewish community.

The only other general and grocery store in the heart of the village was Regimbald's. It was bought by Aimé Gagnon, a returning veteran, in 1945. He and his wife ran the store until 1965.

There were two grocery stores located at the foot of Billings Bridge. The Nelson Graburn store, to the west of the bridge, was sold to Cliff Cummings then J.L. Brulé in 1936. The business was closed around 1955. On the opposite side of the road, Dave Campbell owned a grocery and butcher's shop. It closed and a gas station was built in its place.

=== "Battle of Billings Bridge" ===
The Battle of Billings Bridge is an informal name given to a counter-protest organized by Ottawa residents on February 13, 2022, during the Canada convoy protest. Led by Sean Burges, a senior instructor at Carleton University, the counter-protesters set up a blockade on Riverside Drive at Bank Street at the corner of Billings Bridge. When Ottawa Police arrived and asked residents to move aside, the crowd, bolstered by more locals joining in, refused. After hours of negotiation, the counter-protesters allowed the convoy to retreat on the condition that drivers remove all flags and stickers from their vehicles and surrender their jerry cans.

On the protest's one-year anniversary, a plaque resembling an official City of Ottawa marker was anonymously installed at Billings Bridge to commemorate the event, though it was later removed. The Canadian Museum of History acquired a replica of the plaque for its collection as a historical artifact from the convoy protests, highlighting the event's impact on Ottawa’s community.

== Billings Bridge today ==
On 1 January 1950 14,605 acres of the then-township of Gloucester were annexed by the City of Ottawa, including Billings Bridge, Overbrook, Hurdman's Bridge, Ellwood, Hog’s Back, Manor Park, Rideau Park, Hawthorne, Riverview and Alta Vista.

One consequence was that Billings Bridge streets were nearly all renamed.

| Old name | New name |
|---|---|
| Metcalfe Road | Bank Street |
| Beverley Street | Bélanger Avenue |
| Hill Street | Clementine Blvd. |
| Elm Street | Rockingham Avenue |
| Creek Street | Ohio Street |
| Bowesville Road and River Road | Riverside Drive |

== See also ==
- Billings Bridge Plaza
- Billings Bridge Transitway Station
- List of Ottawa neighbourhoods
