= Heron Park =

- Neighbourhood
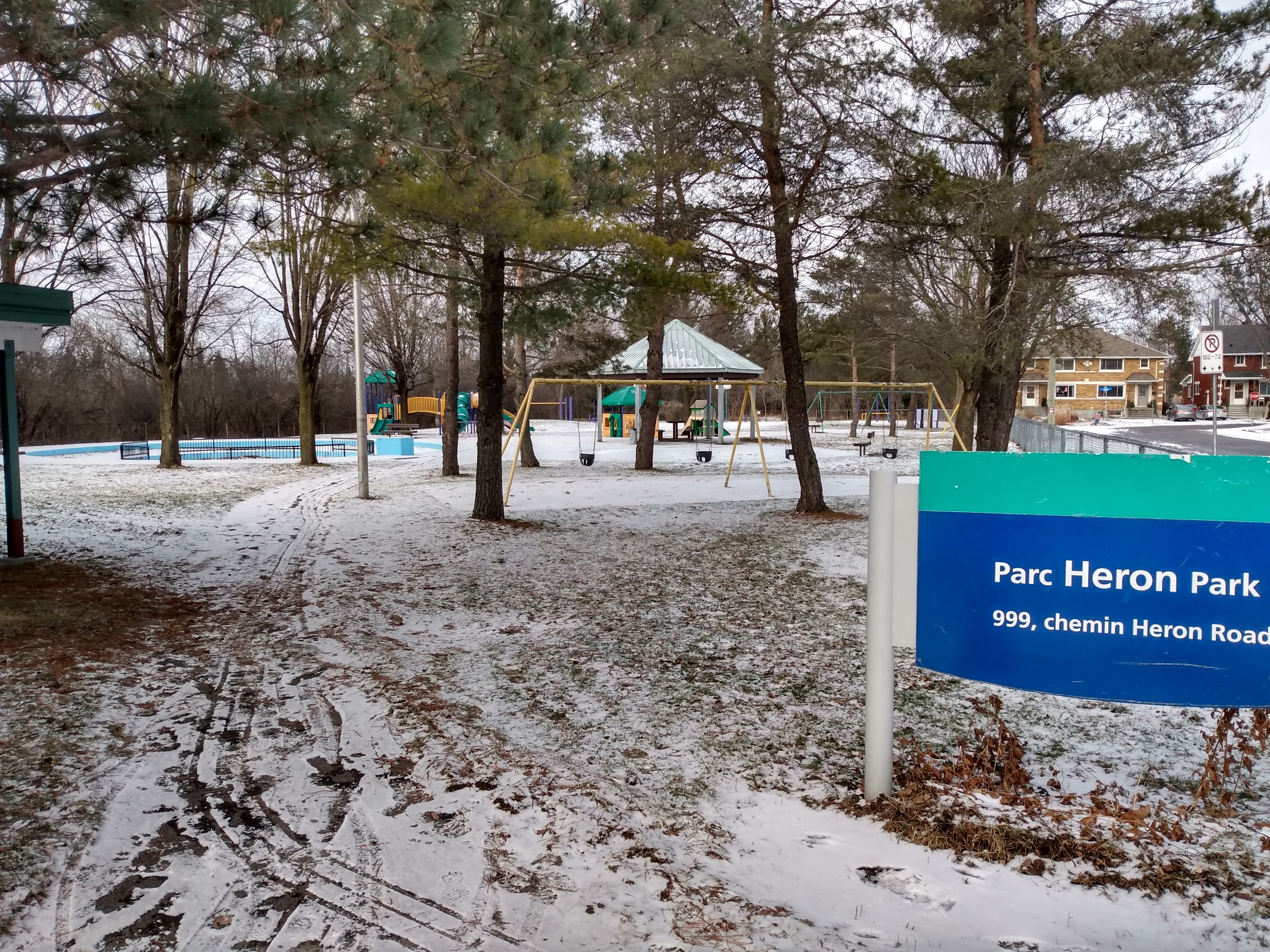
- Heron Park

- Location within Ottawa
- Coordinates: 45.377976°N 75.673278°W
- Country: Canada
- Province: Ontario
- City: Ottawa

Government
  - MPs: Yasir Naqvi
  - MPPs: John Fraser
  - Councillors: Shawn Menard
  - Governing body: Heron Park Community Association
  - President: Ben Fogel
  - Vice President: Susan Carbone

Area
  - Total: 2.126 km^{2} (0.821 sq mi)
- Elevation: 80 m (260 ft)

Population (2021)
  - Total: 4,758
  - Density: 2,238/km^{2} (5,796/sq mi)
- Time zone: Eastern (EST)
- Forward sortation areas: K1H, K1V
- Website: Community Association

Heron Park is a neighbourhood in Capital Ward in Ottawa, Ontario, Canada. Its boundaries are the Rideau River to the north, the Sawmill Creek to the west, Bank Street to the east and Walkley Road to the south.

The neighbourhood is divided by Heron Road but is considered all one neighbourhood. The neighbourhood is sometimes called Billings Bridge, due to its proximity to the bridge, which is the site of a former village and the Billings Bridge Shopping Centre. The total population of the neighbourhood is 4,758 (Canada 2021 Census).

== History ==
Today's Heron Park neighbourhood consists of the western half (west of Bank) of the village of Billings Bridge, which was the first settlement in Gloucester Township in 1812. In 1874, the community of Gateville was founded at where Metcalfe Road (today's Bank Street) crossed Billings Creek (Sawmill Creek), located south of Billings Bridge. During the Great Depression, Gateville was known as "Poverty Hill" and "Deadbeat's Hill". Gloucester was annexed by Ottawa in 1950 and the Billings Bridge village was expropriated. Soon after, the Heron Park community was built south of Gateville.

== Parks ==
- Heron Park (located at Clover St. and Heron Rd.)
- Kaladar Park (located at Brookfield Rd. E and Kaladar Ave.)
- Bruce Timmermans Park (located at Gilles St. and Apolydor Ave.)
- Brookfield Park (located at Junction Ave. and Brookfield Rd. E)

== Features ==
As well it includes the natural beauty of the pathways beside the Sawmill Creek.

Many neighbourhood businesses are located along Bank Street, such as the Blue Heron Mall which includes Farm Boy, Icheban Bakery, M&M Meats and Colonnade Pizza.

Community Association meetings are held on the first Thursday of most months at 7pm in the Community Centre at Heron Park.

== See also ==
- List of Ottawa neighbourhoods
