= Mathurin Moreau =

French sculptor (1822–1912)

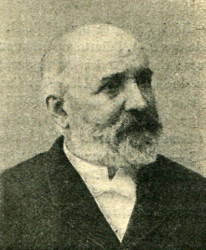
Mathurin Moreau

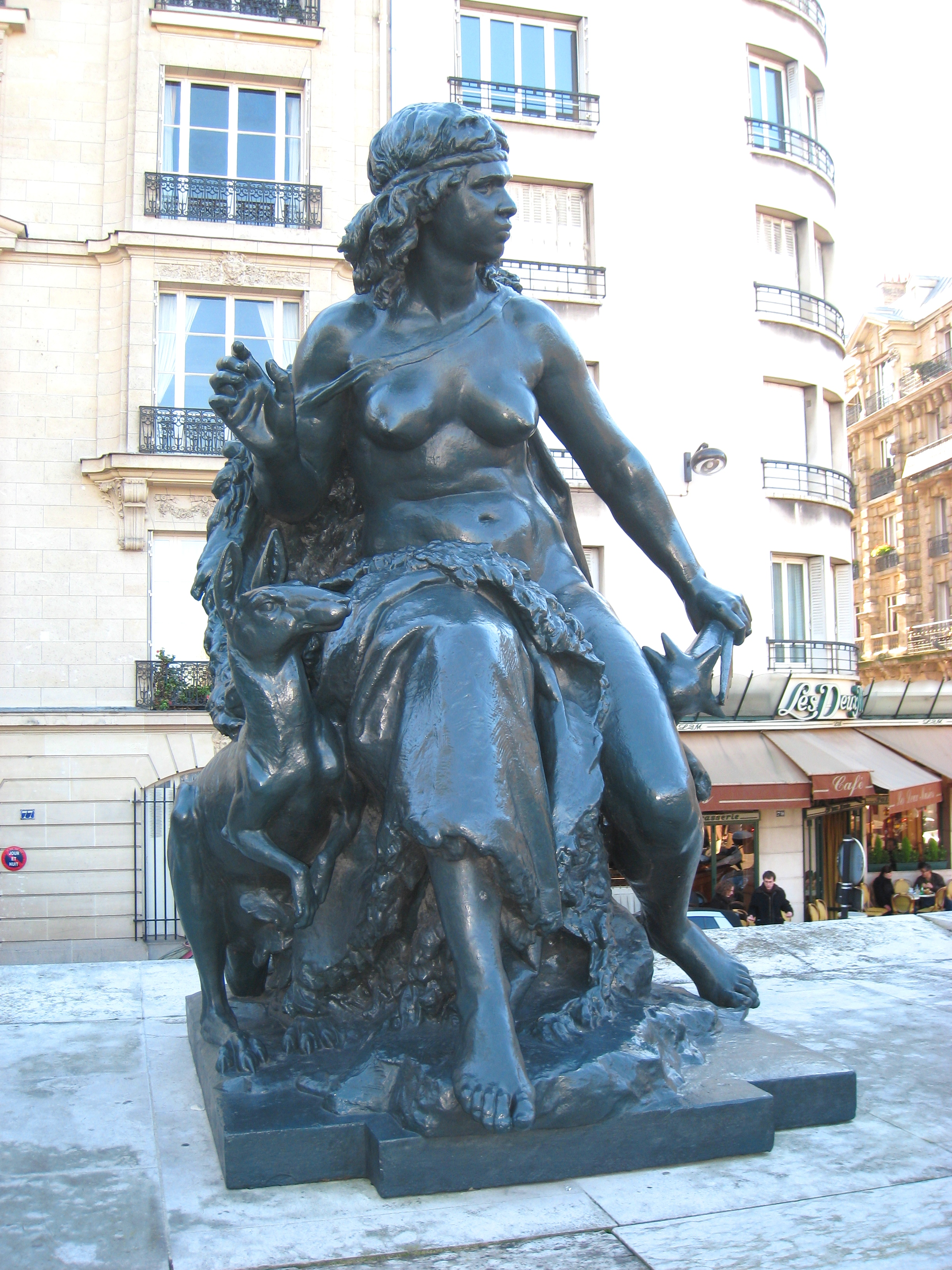
L'Océanie, by Mathurin Moreau

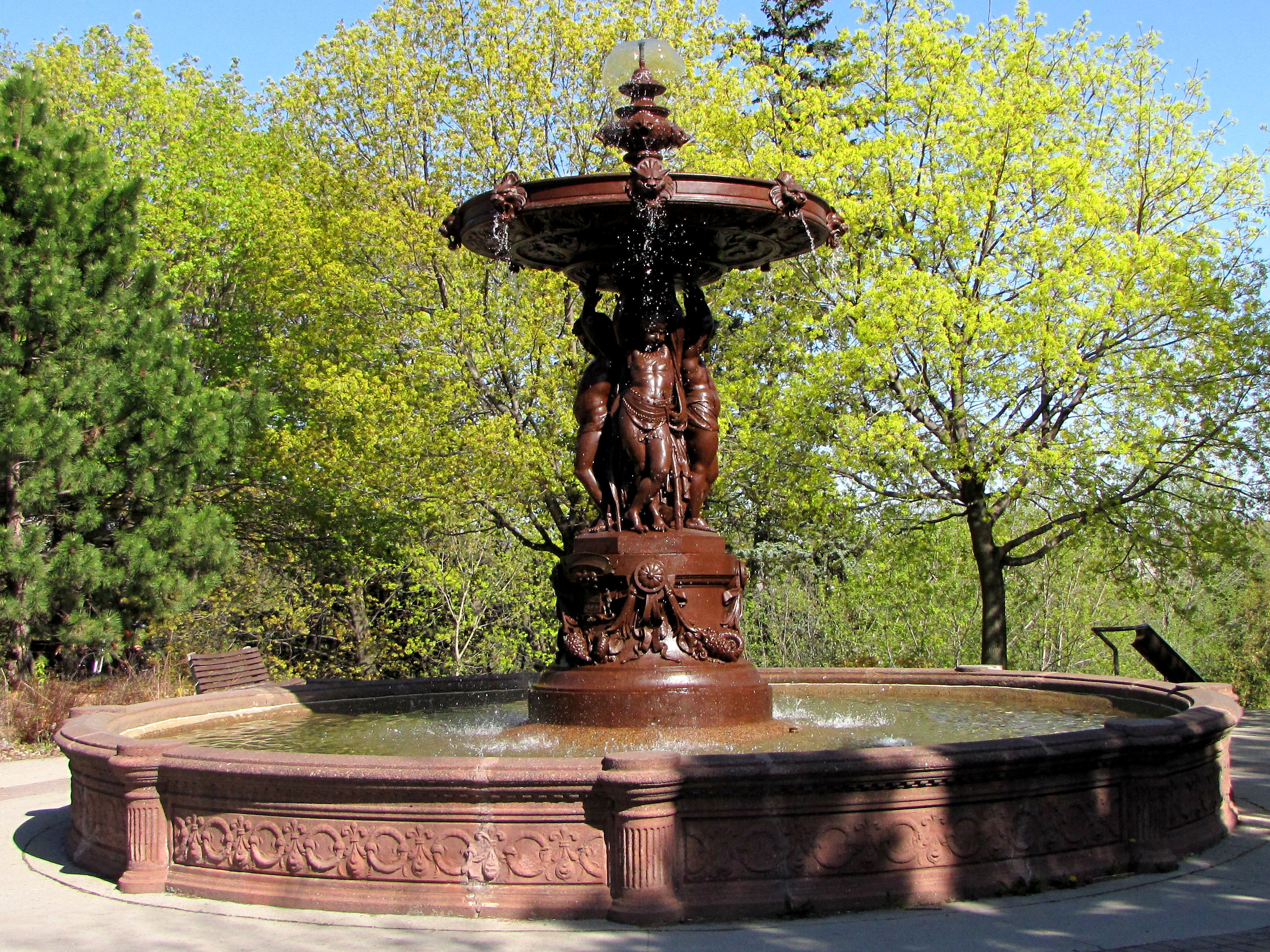
Lord Strathcona Fountain, Ottawa, Ontario, Canada

Mathurin Moreau (18 November 1822 – 14 February 1912) was a French sculptor in the academic style.

Moreau was born in Dijon, first exhibited in the Salon of 1848, and finally received a medal of honor from the Salon in 1897. He was made mayor of the 19th arrondissement of Paris, and in 1912 had a street named in his honor. His father was the sculptor Jean-Baptiste-Louis-Joseph Moreau and his siblings included sculptors Hippolyte and Auguste Moreau.

== Selected works ==
- La Fileuse, marble, Palais du Luxembourg
- Victoria Park Fountain, Ashford Kent, originally 1862.
- Cologne, limestone, 1865, façade of the Gare du Nord, Paris
- Nymphe fluviale, the Place du Theâtre-Français, Paris (1874)
- L'Océanie, from the Exposition Universelle (1878), Musée d'Orsay courtyard
- Zenobe Gramme, bronze, Musée des Arts et Métiers courtyard, Paris
- Monument de Joigneaux, for which he received the medal of honor, Salon of 1897
- Tomb of Zenobe Gramme, Père Lachaise Cemetery, Paris, circa 1901
- Lord Strathcona Fountain, Ottawa, Ontario, Canada, unveiled 1 July 1909
- Fountain of the Continents (The original name was La Fontaine de L'Observatoire), Mendoza (Argentina), 1910.
- Négresse and Égyptienne - mass-produced neoclassical style beaux-arts statues depicting female ancient Egyptian and ancient Kushite royal figures holding aloft a torch. Usually cast in iron. Notable examples can be seen outside the Shelbourne Hotel in Dublin, at the mausoleum of the American architect Temple Hoyne Buell and in the Jardins do Palácio de Cristal in Porto.
