= Billings Bridge station =

Station on the OC Transpo Transitway

Billings Bridge
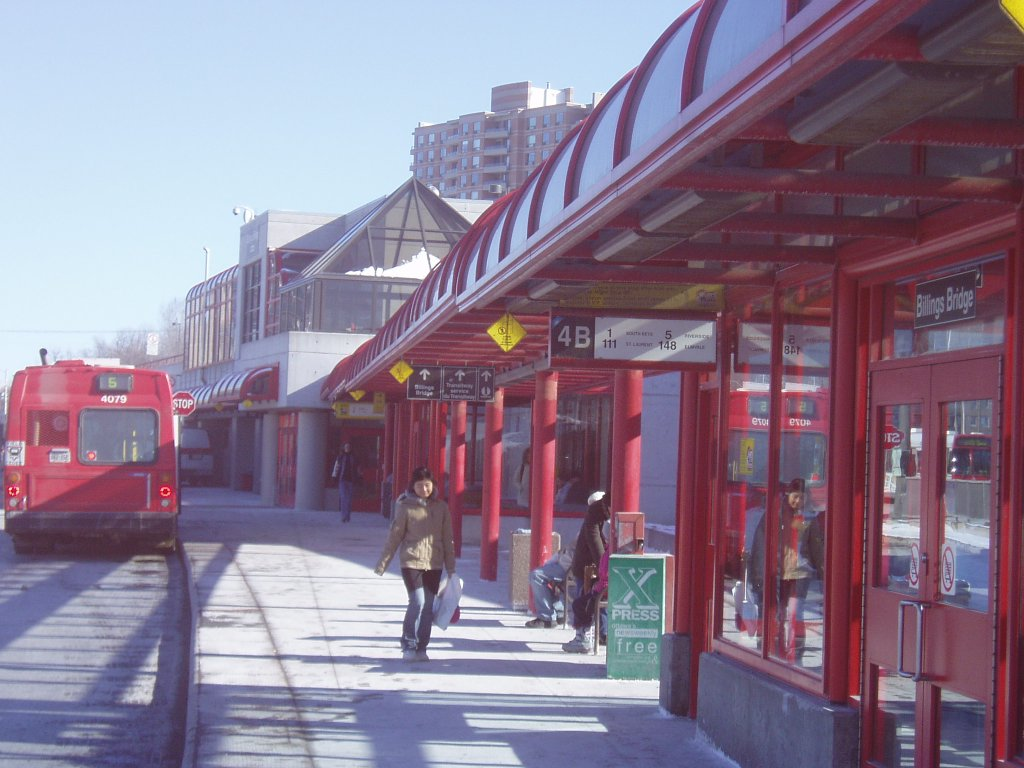

General information
- Location: Ottawa, Ontario; Canada
- Coordinates: 45°23′05″N 75°40′36″W
- Owner: OC Transpo
- Platforms: 4

History
- Opened: 1983
- Rebuilt: 1996

Services
Preceding station	OC Transpo	Following station
Heron toward Hawthorne	Route 98	Pleasant Park toward Hurdman
Heron toward Airport	Route 105	Pleasant Park toward St-Laurent
Former services
Preceding station	OC Transpo	Following station
Heron toward Airport	Route 97 Closed April 2025	Pleasant Park toward Hurdman
Heron toward Barrhaven Centre	Route 99 Truncated April 2025	Pleasant Park toward Hurdman
Location

Billings Bridge is a station on the OC Transpo Transitway, adjacent to the Billings Bridge Plaza, Ottawa, Ontario, Canada. It is named for, not only the plaza, but after Billings Bridge itself which is both a nearby bridge and neighbourhood (named for the early settler of the area, Braddish Billings). The transitway station itself is a major stop on the southern transitway-line due to its location near Bank Street, Ottawa's major north–south road and the mall itself. The station is located just south of the Plaza near the intersection between Bank Street and Riverside Drive.

There are two levels on the station. The upper level is on the transitway itself, while the lower level serves buses coming from the nearby Data Centre Road and Bank Street. There is a pedestrian bridge that leads from the lower level to the Plaza.

The station was officially opened with the southern transitway on September 3, 1995, replacing a temporary station which had existed on the site since the 1980s. Previously, the shopping centre had been served by buses which collected and discharged passengers at stops along the front of the plaza.

== Service ==
The following routes serve Billings Bridge:

Billings Bridge Station Service
Frequent routes	6 10 41 44 88 90 98 105 111
Local routes	18 48 92 110 112
Shoppers routes	304
Event routes	451 452
School routes	18 41 646 647 689

=== Notes ===
- Route 111 starts and ends at this station on weekends and statutory holidays, as opposed to starting and ending at Carleton station.
- Route 110 only serves this station before the Trillium Line at 6:00 AM.
- After 9pm, all buses except for Routes 105 and 98 serve the lower level night stop only.
