= Embassy Row, Ottawa =

Coordinates: 45.4288°N 75.6760°W

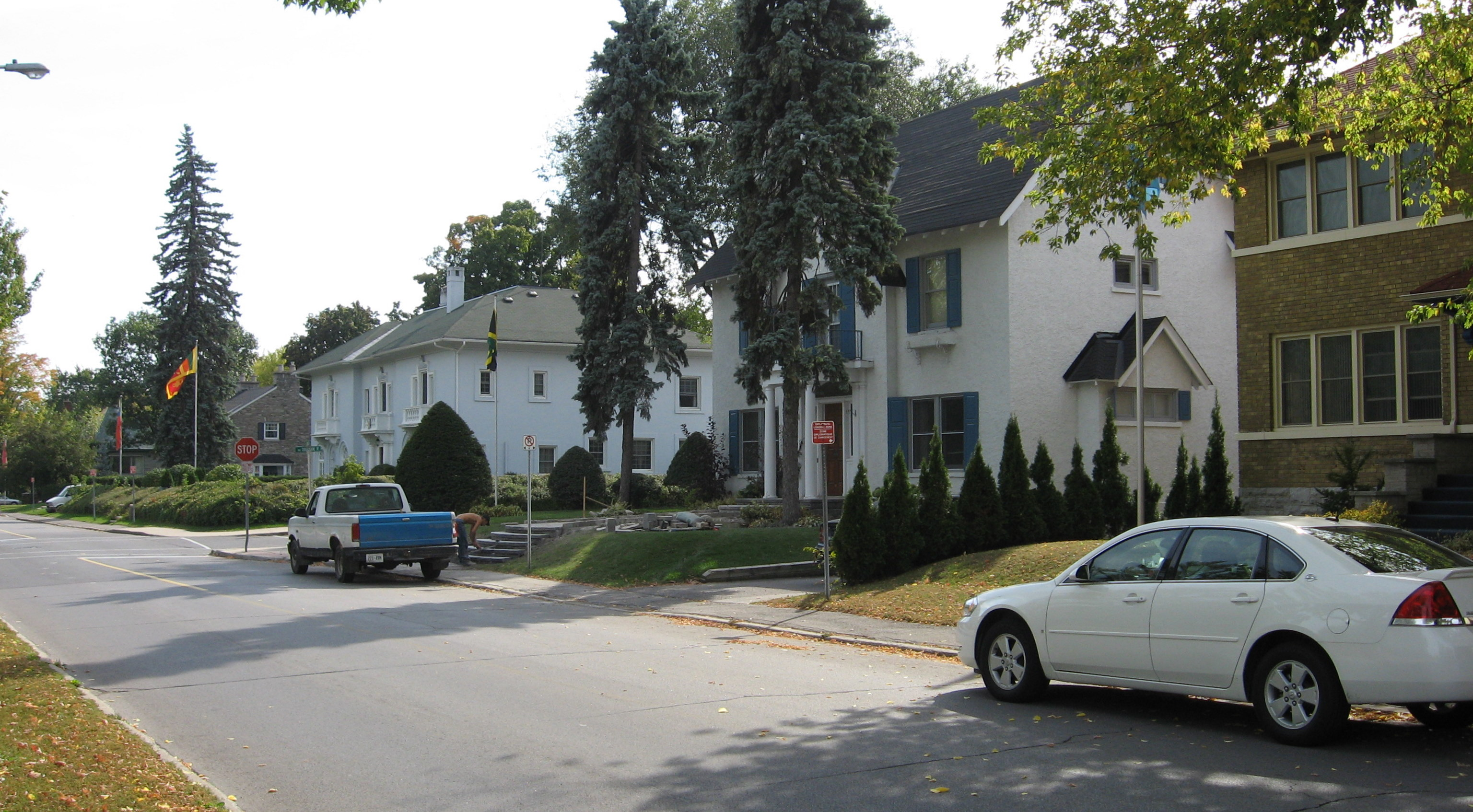
An example of the high density of embassies, high commissions and ambassadorial residences on Range Road. From left to right, Morocco, Venezuela, Sri Lanka, Jamaica and DR Congo.

Embassy Row in Ottawa, Ontario, Canada is generally considered the eastern part of the Sandy Hill and Lower Town neighbourhoods. These areas are sometimes home to buildings that serve as a chancery (the administrative headquarters of a foreign mission) but more often they are ambassadorial residences (where an ambassador or high commissioner lives). Sometimes the same building serves both purposes, but when they are separated the chancery tends to be located in a commercial or government district of the city, while the official residence is in a residential neighbourhood. Numerous foreign embassies and high commissions (some chanceries, some residences, some both) are found in the vicinity of Strathcona Park. Many embassies are located on Range Road, Wilbrod Street, and parts of Laurier Avenue and Charlotte Street.

== See also ==
- List of embassies and high commissions in Ottawa
