= Ballantyne Park =

Park in Ottawa, Canada

Coordinates: 45.412646°N 75.680995°W

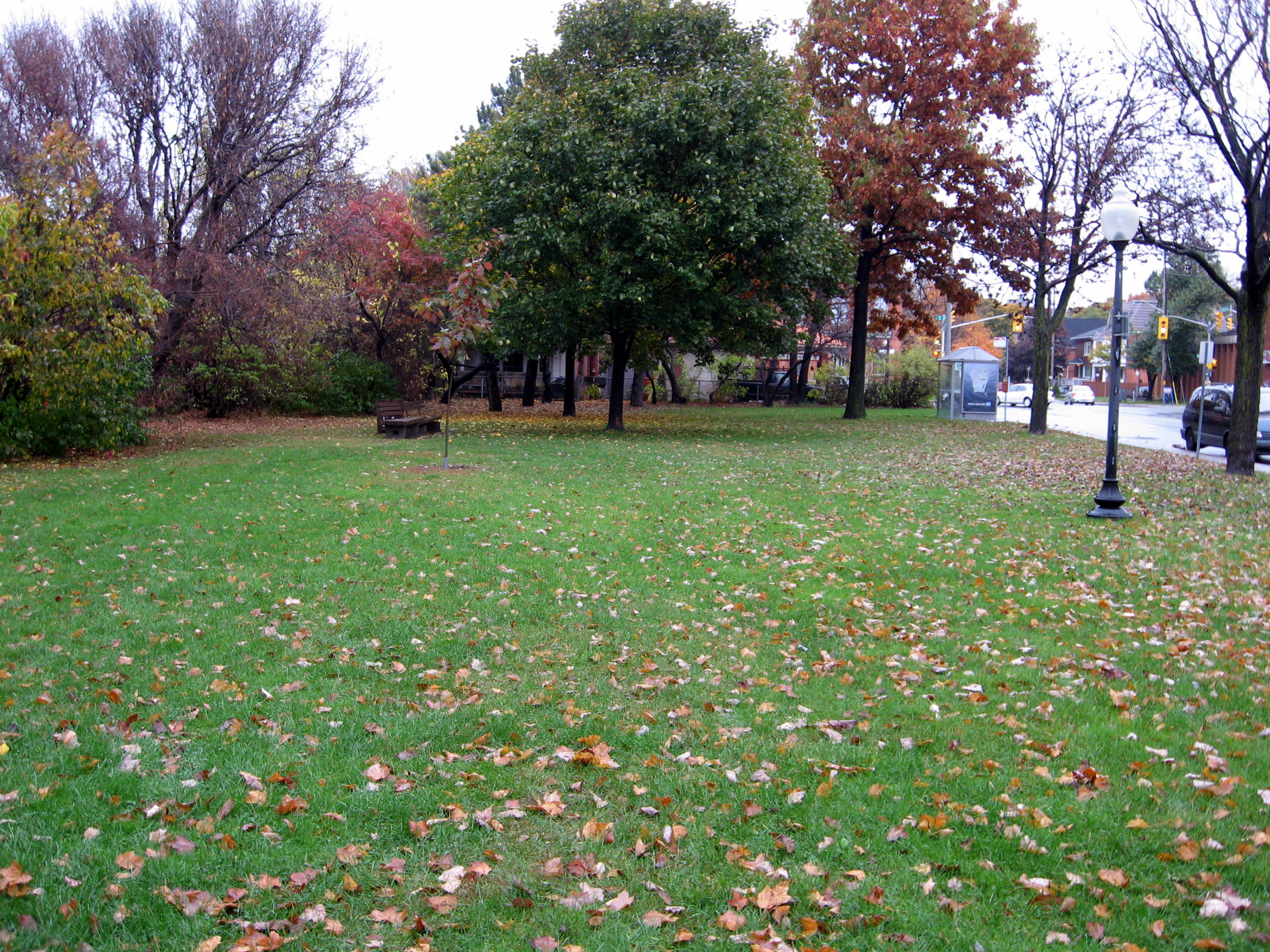
The park seen from the west.

Ballantyne Park is a city park in Ottawa, Ontario, Canada. The north side of the park is bounded by the Queensway. The park is small, measuring only 100 metres long by 30 metres wide.

The land for the park was donated to the city in 1929 by the family of James Ballantyne, a merchant and municipal office-holder. The park is made notable by the presence of three antique gas streetlights.

OC Transpo buses 5 (St. Laurent) stop at a bus shelter at the park.

== See also ==
- List of Ottawa, Ontario parks
