= Adàwe Crossing =

Canadian bridge across the Rideau River in Ottawa

Coordinates: 45°25′34.8″N 75°40′12.6″W

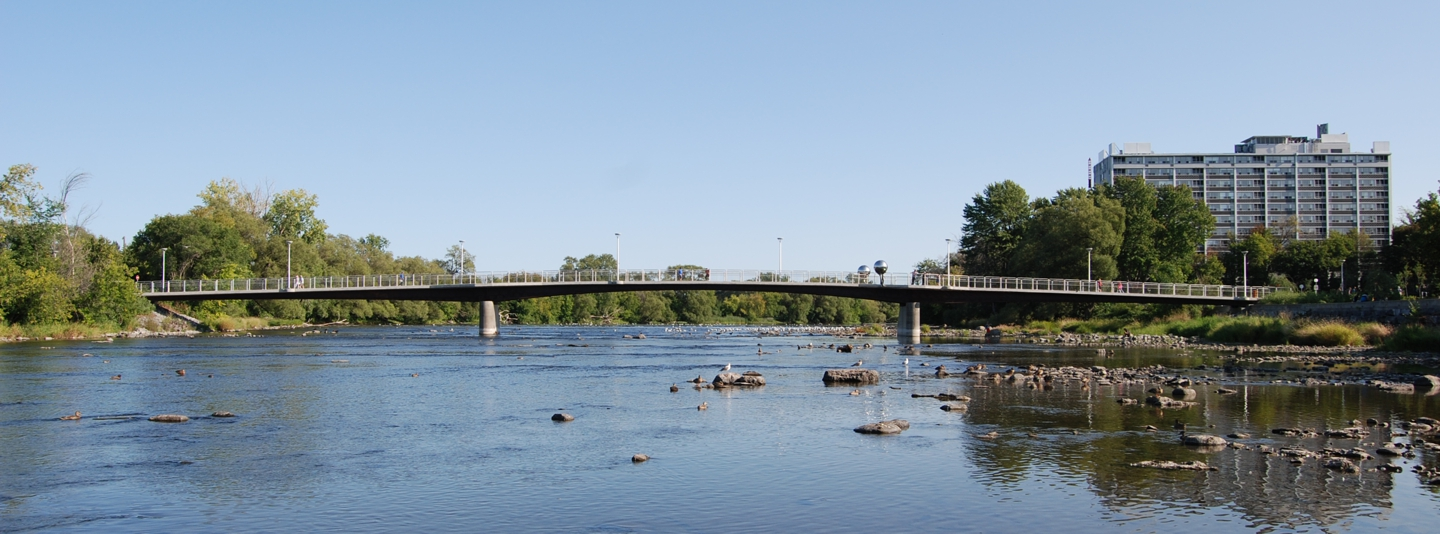
Adàwe Crossing looking south (upstream)

The Adàwe Crossing (French: passerelle Adàwe) is a pedestrian and cyclist bridge in Ottawa, Ontario, Canada, built across the Rideau River. It is located about 1,200 metres (1,300 yd) north (downstream) of the Highway 417 bridge (Provincial Constable J. Robert Maki Bridge) and 800 metres (870 yd) south (upstream) from the Cummings Bridge. It was opened on December 4, 2015 and links the communities of Overbrook and Sandy Hill.

The Adàwe Crossing is an approximately 125m long bridge structure that consists of three spans with variable steel girders and a composite concrete deck. The usable deck width is 4m and it increases to a 7m width at the two mid-river piers which provide for two lookout areas on both the north and south sides. The Rideau River is a navigable river and the height of the bridge respects water clearance requirements including those for the annual spring ice clearing operations.

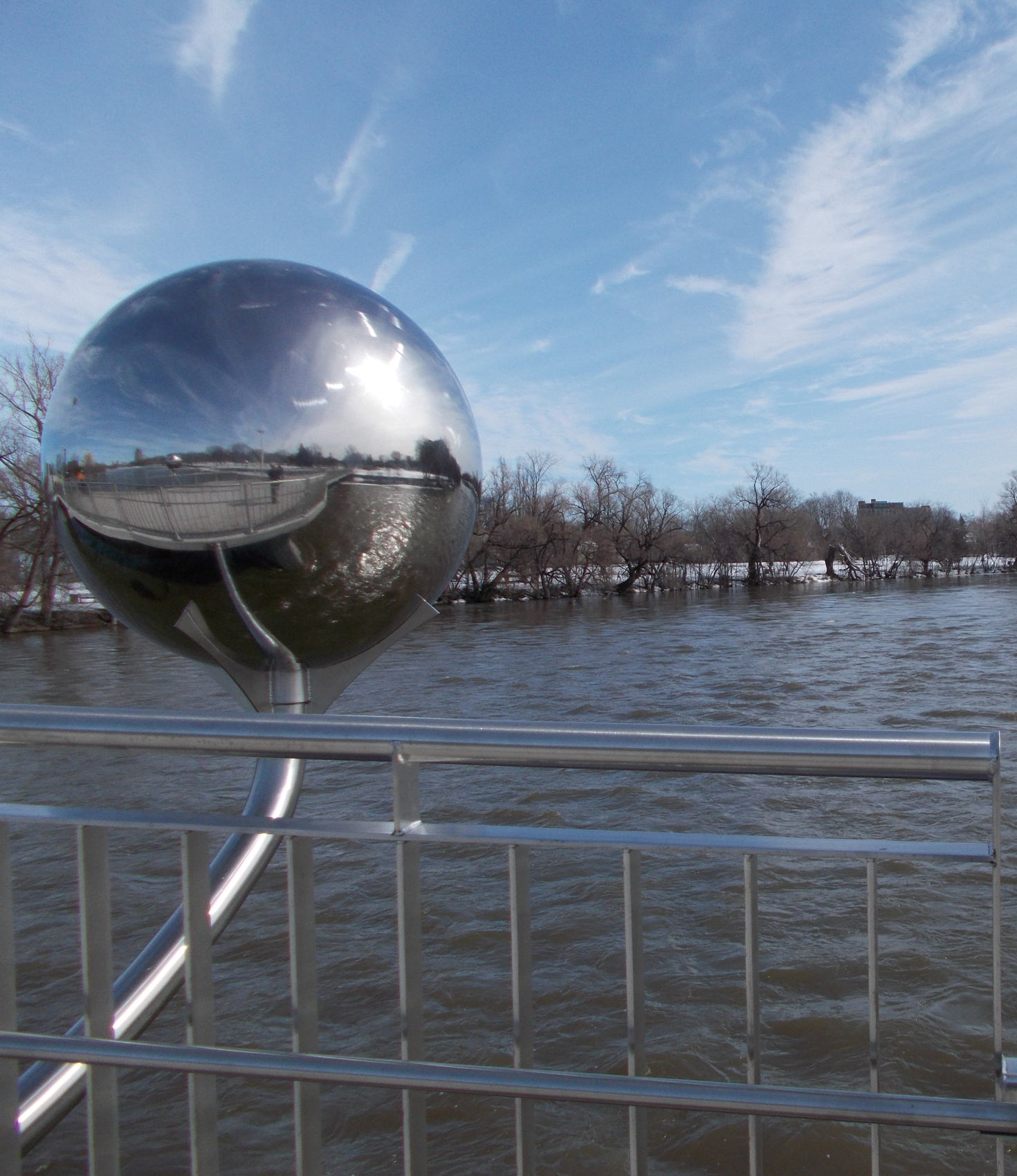
Art work entitled "A View from Two Sides" - March 2016

The design and construction budget for the bridge and related works was $9.2 million. This included construction of multi-use pathway connections from the bridge west through Strathcona Park to the Range Road and Somerset Street East intersection and east along Donald Street to North River Road, together with rehabilitation of the parking lot in Strathcona Park and a short section of Donald Street.

In the first ten days after the bridge opened about 20,000 trips were taken across it by pedestrians and cyclists. The busiest user month to date was July 2017 with over 121,000 trip crossings. During the prime cycling months of May to September inclusive the monthly crossing totals range between 90,000 and 110,000 trips, generally evenly split between pedestrians and cyclists. The Adàwe Crossing continues to prove to be a popular location to take photos from the bridge, of the bridge and of the bridge's art work "A View from Two Sides".

The Adàwe Crossing and its pathways are part of a City of Ottawa crosstown bikeway (Route #3) identified in the Ottawa Cycling Plan. To the west this crosstown bikeway leads via Somerset Street East to the nearby University of Ottawa and downtown of Ottawa. The bikeway route continues to the Corktown Footbridge over the Rideau Canal.

== History ==
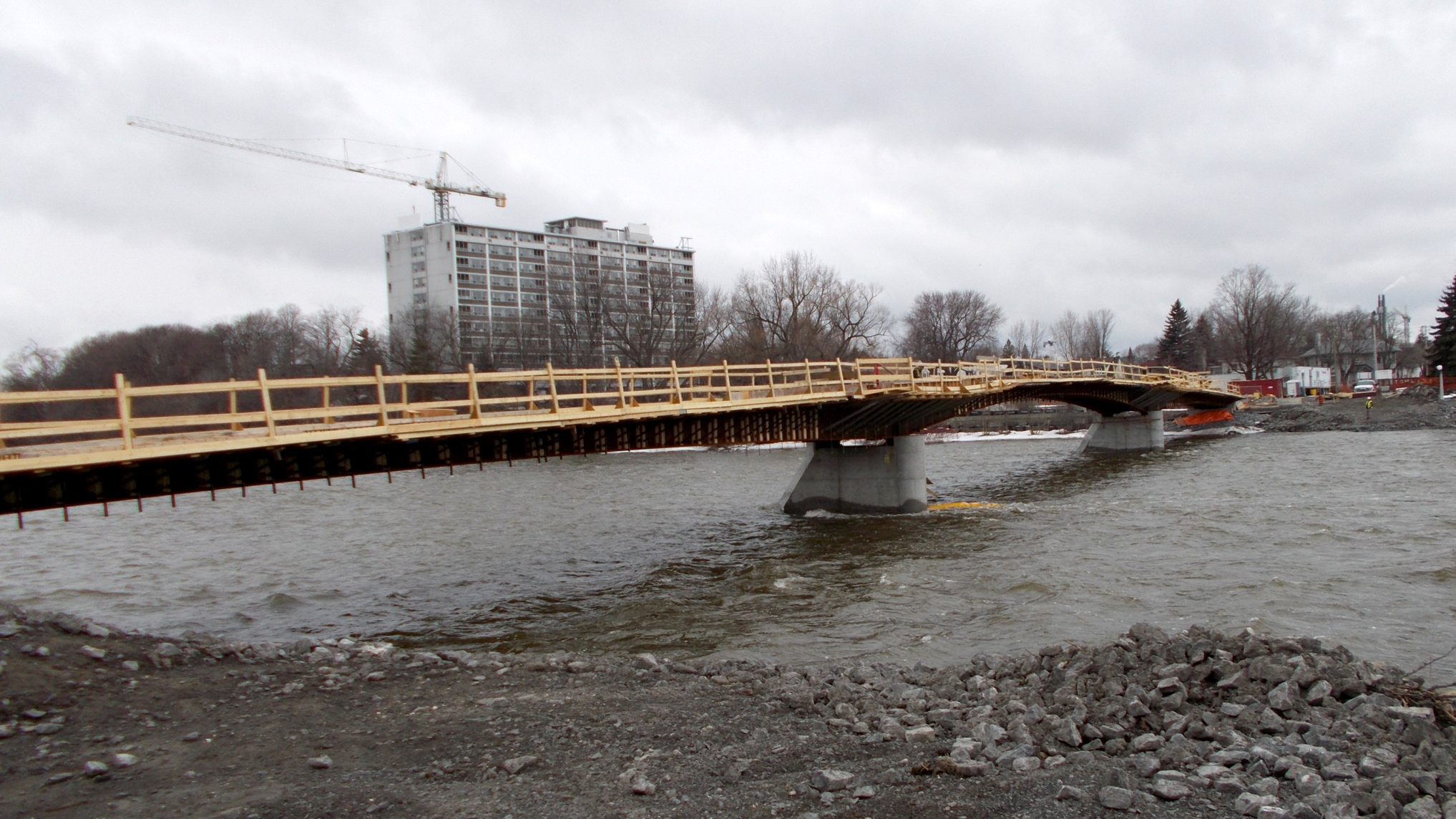
Bridge under construction April 2015

The Adàwe Crossing is not the first footbridge at this location. A seasonal wooden footbridge was installed in approximately this same location in the first half of the last century with it appearing in 1928 air photos. In 1952 the bridge was washed away and not replaced. Plans for a new bridge connection are identified in the still in force 1994 Sandy Hill Secondary Plan, part of the Official Plan, of the City of Ottawa. More recently it has been shown in the City's 2013 Transportation Master Plan, Ottawa Pedestrian Plan and Ottawa Cycling Plan.

== Naming ==
"Adàwe" is an Algonquin word for trade, one that symbolizes the river's historic importance and is symbolic of the history of the Rideau River, the aboriginal heritage of the area and the bridge's ability to link the communities on either side. This name was recommended by a selection committee set up by City Councillors Mathieu Fleury (Rideau-Vanier) and Tobi Nussbaum (Rideau-Rockcliffe) and accepted by Council on November 25, 2015.

== Art work – "A View from Two Sides" ==
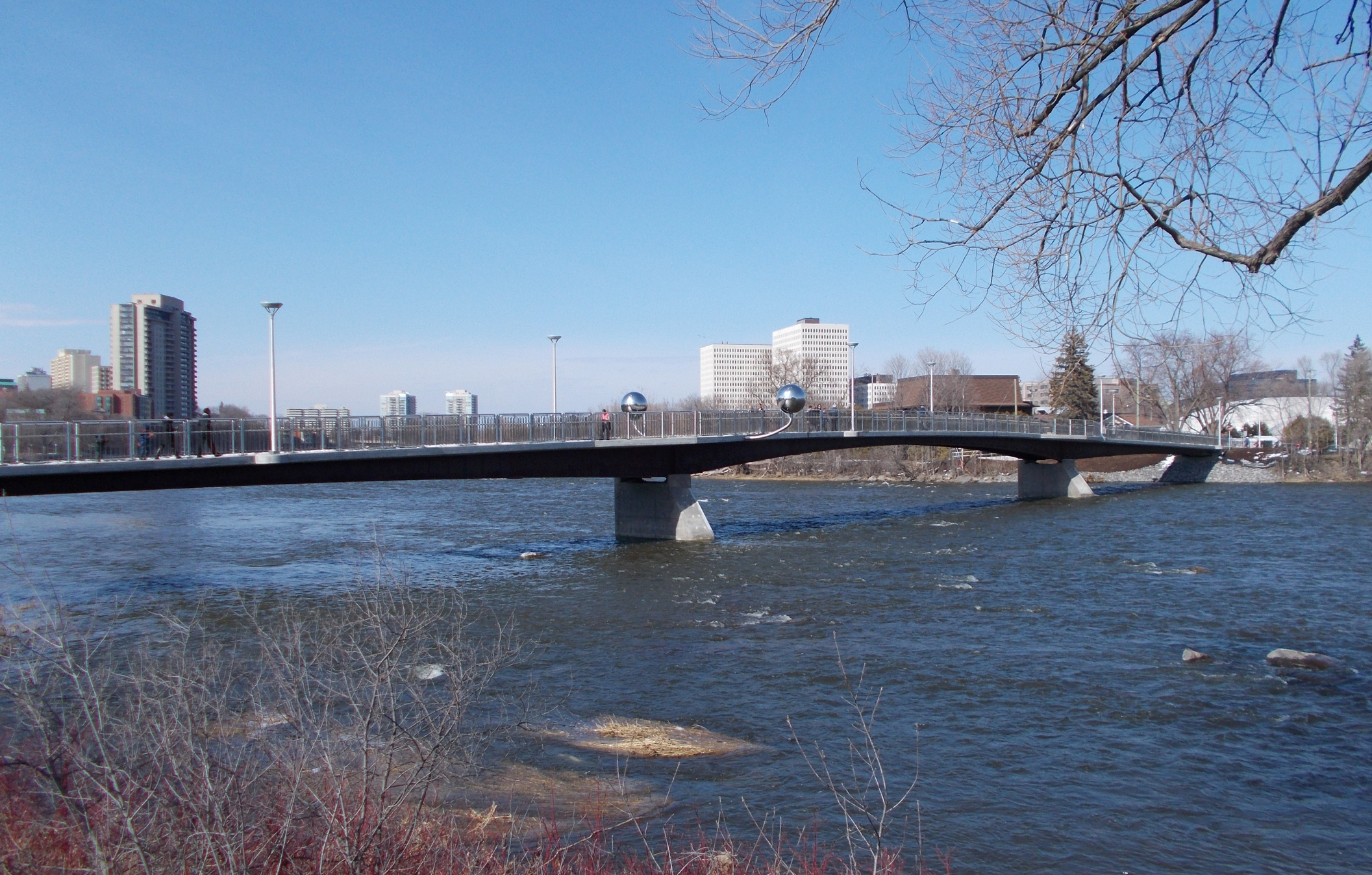
Spherical artwork "A View from Two Sides" visible on the Adàwe Crossing - view looking north (downstream) March 2016

"A View from Two Sides" is a City of Ottawa public art commission located on the Adàwe Crossing. In the 2017 City of Ottawa Urban Design Awards it won an Award of Merit: Urban Elements. The artwork, by Ottawa artist Kenneth Emig, features two 1.5m diameter reflective stainless steel spheres, suspended at eye level above the bridge level. Each sphere presents the observer with an ever-changing panoramic view that includes the sky, river, shores, bridge, pedestrians and cyclists.

The bridge provides access to the natural beauty of the surrounding parks, river, and community from the middle of the river. "A View from Two sides" condenses that broader visual experience into two locations and places the viewer in the middle, both visually and figuratively, enhancing the human experience of a beautiful location. The artwork offers a place to meet the surrounding environment and experience the sensuality of engagement.
