= Dutchy's Hole Park =

Park in Ottawa, Canada

Coordinates: 45.41961°N 75.66706°W

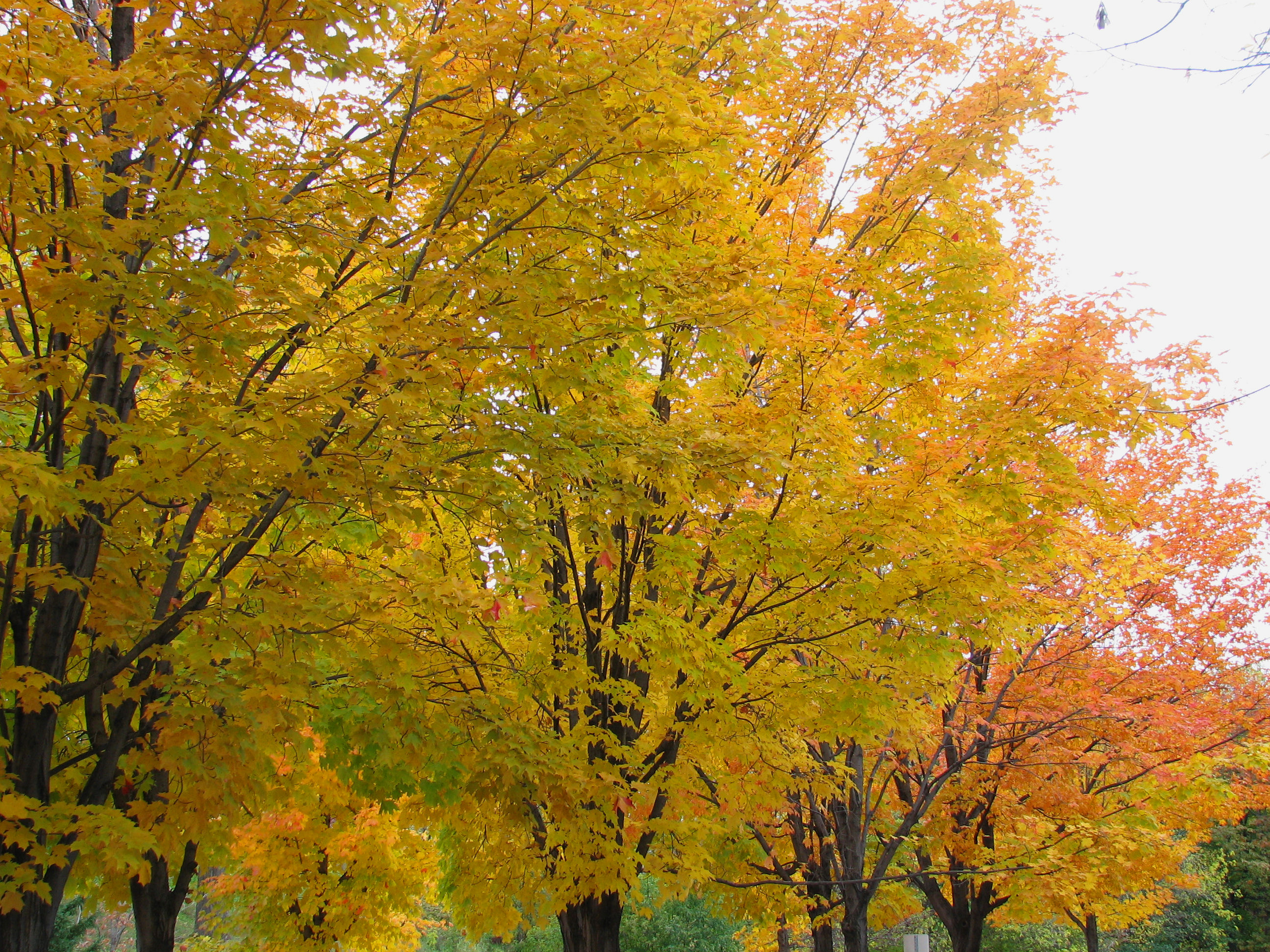
Maples in autumn colours in park

Dutchy's Hole Park or Robinson Park is a park on the Rideau River in Ottawa, Ontario, Canada. It is part of the downtown Ottawa neighbourhood of Sandy Hill. The park has a wading pool, playground, and a football field, called Robinson Field. Pathways connect the park with Strathcona Park, the Lees Campus of the University of Ottawa and via a former train bridge with Parc Riverain/River Road Park across the Rideau River in Vanier.

The park includes a football field, called Robinson Field, the Dutchie's Hole Wading Pool, and the Sandy Hill and Strathcona Heights community gardens. It is one of three locations the City of Ottawa uses to release mute swans and black swans that inhabit the Rideau River during the summer months.

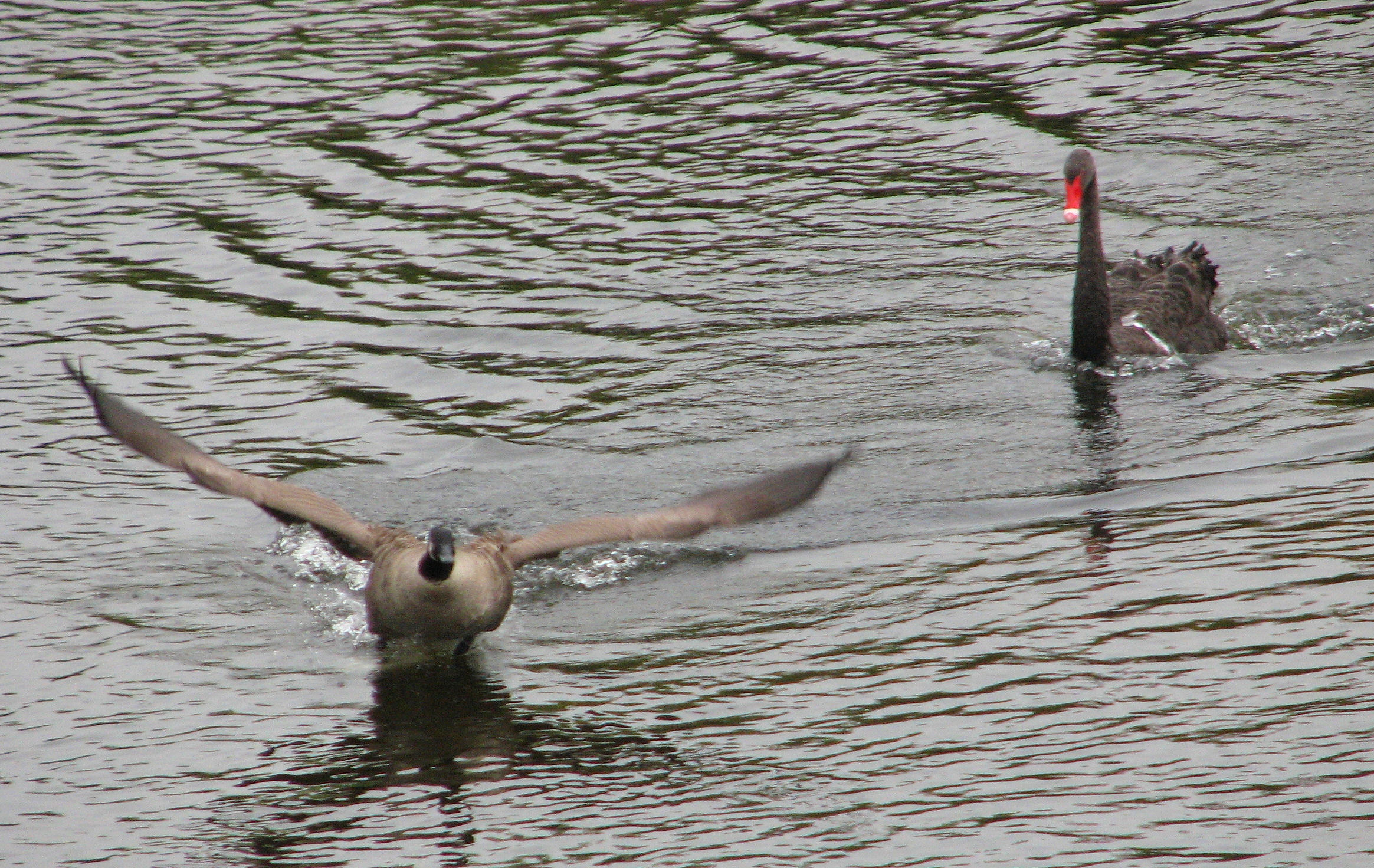
Canada goose chased by a black swan in Rideau River beside the park

== See also ==
- List of Ottawa parks
