= Heron station =

Bus-stop on Heron Road, Ottawa, Canada

Heron
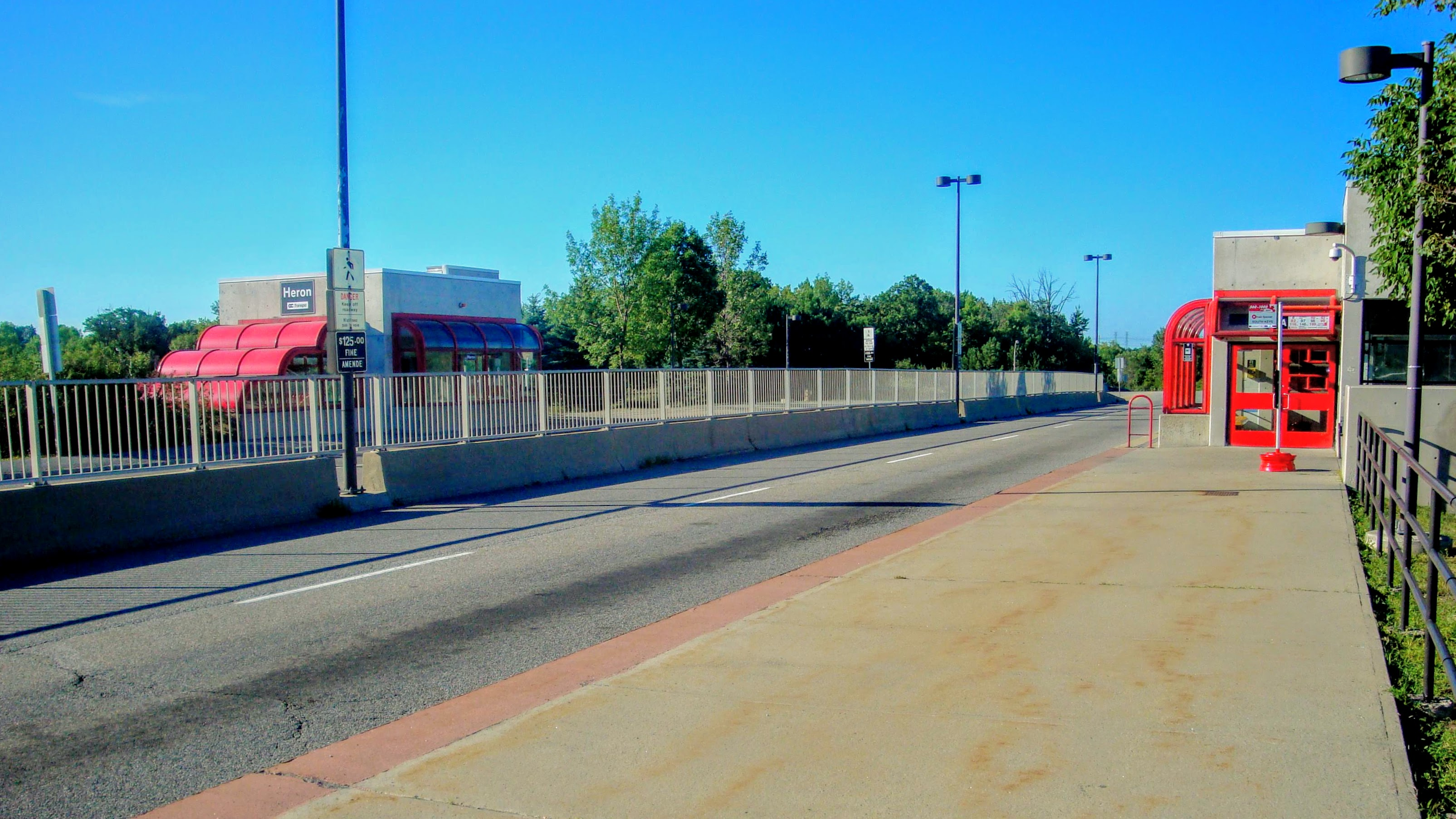
- Heron station looking northwest along the transitway

General information
- Location: Ottawa, Ontario; Canada
- Coordinates: 45°22′43″N 75°40′47″W
- Owner: OC Transpo

Services
Preceding station	OC Transpo	Following station
Walkley toward Hawthorne	Route 98	Billings Bridge toward Hurdman
Walkley toward Airport	Route 105	Billings Bridge toward St-Laurent
Former services
Preceding station	OC Transpo	Following station
Walkley toward Airport	Route 97 Closed April 2025	Billings Bridge toward Hurdman
Walkley toward Barrhaven Centre	Route 99 Truncated April 2025	Billings Bridge toward Hurdman
Location

Heron station is a stop on Ottawa's transitway served by OC Transpo buses. It is located in the south-eastern transitway section at Heron Park on Heron Road.

Nearby government buildings including Canada Post and Mooney's Bay station for the O-Train, are the main trip generators as well as a residential area just to its east.

== Service ==
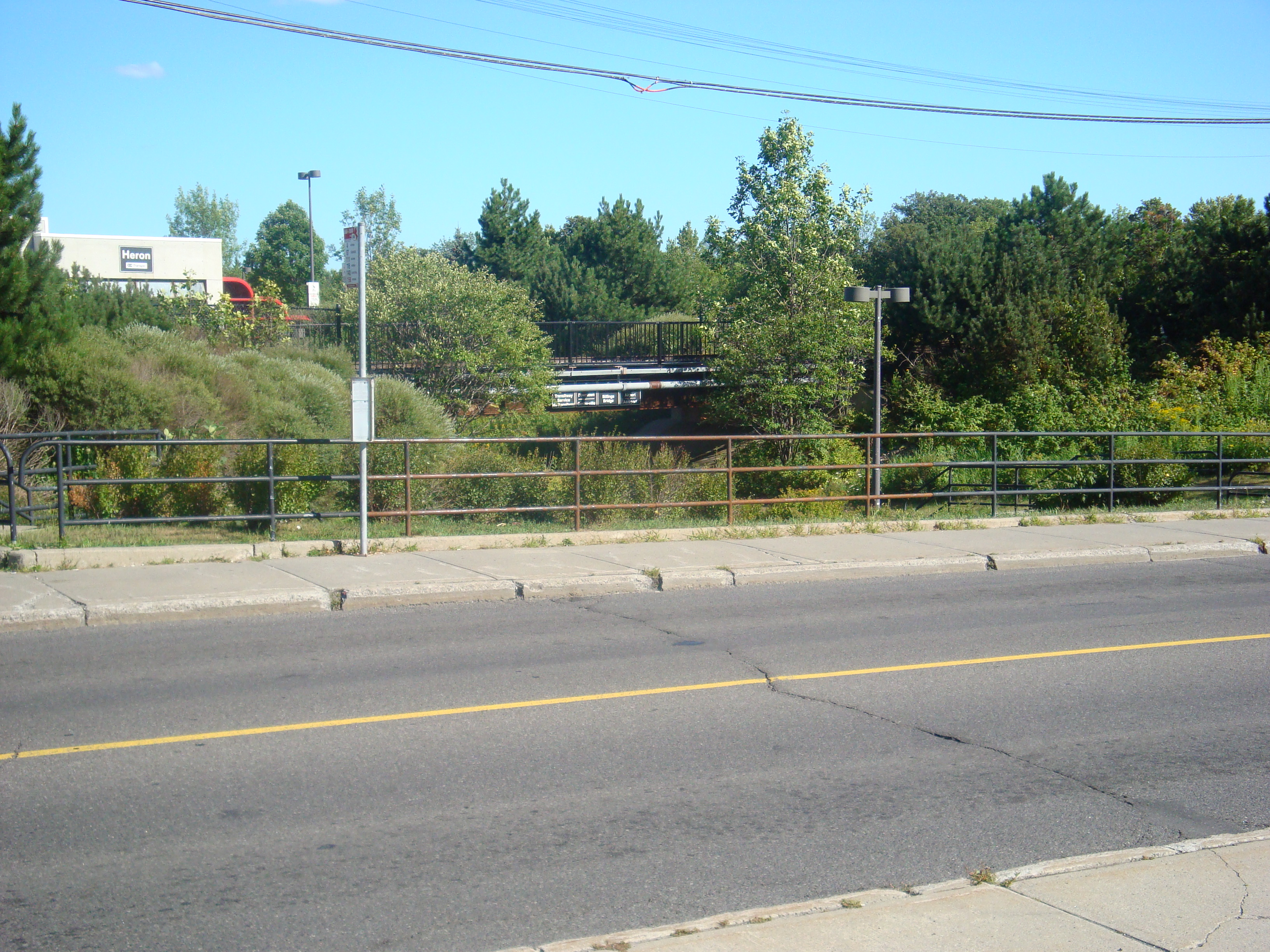
The lower level of Heron station.

The following routes serve Heron:

Heron station service
Frequent routes	10 44 88 90 98 105 111
Local routes	110 112
Shopper routes	304
Event routes	452
School routes	646 689

=== Notes ===
- Routes 10, 88, 90, 111, 112, 646 and 689 serve this station on Data Centre Road instead of the southeast Transitway.
- Route 110 only serves this station before the Trillium Line opens 6:00 AM.
