= Billings Bridge Shopping Centre =

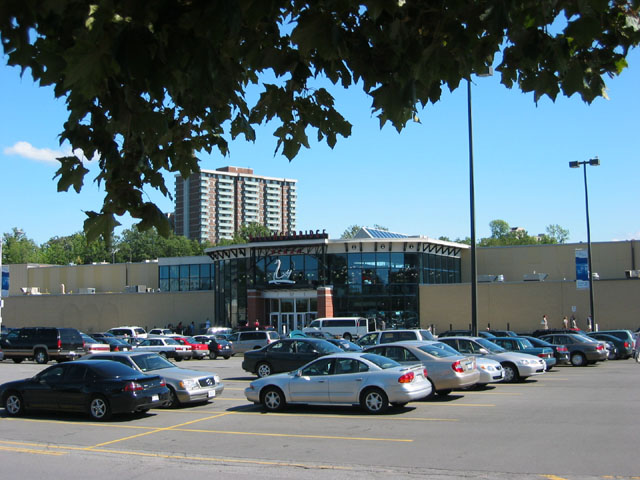
- Coordinates: 45.3856°N 75.6775°W
- Address: 2277 Riverside Drive East; Ottawa, Ontario; K1H 7X6
- Opened: October 1954
- Manager: Salthill Property Management Inc.
- Owner: Capital City Shopping Centre Ltd.
- Num. of stores: 83
- Num. of anchor tenants: 2
- Floor area: 488,000 sq ft (45,300 m^{2})
- Floors: 2
- Parking: 1341 spaces
- Public transit: Billings Bridge
- Website: billingsbridge.com

Billings Bridge Shopping Centre is a shopping mall located in the Billings Bridge neighbourhood of Ottawa, Ontario, Canada. It is a medium-sized community mall with 83 stores and services. Roughly 7.5 million people visit the mall every year and sales are about $527/sq foot. When built, it was the first strip mall in Ottawa, although it has since become an enclosed mall. It is located immediately south of the Rideau River on the corner of Bank Street and Riverside Drive. The mall's anchor stores are Walmart and Your Independent Grocer.

Billings Bridge Shopping Centre opened in 1954 as "the first one-stop shopping destination to serve all of the City of Ottawa" according to its owners. At 65,750 sq ft (6,108 m^{2}) it was Ottawa's first strip mall. The mall originally consisted of just six stores, of which only Reitmans remains to this day. CIBC and Fairweather were also very early tenants which still remain.

In the years following the mall's opening, twenty stores in the mall were staying open past 6 pm on weekdays, the required time of closure by City of Ottawa by-law. As of 1956, the six units that took the municipality to court lost their appeal in court.

The mall opened an expansion in November 1961, and another in March 1962, the latter bringing it to 33 stores. This made it one of Ottawa's largest shopping centres. The parking lot also expanded from 500 spots to 1400. The 1962 addition added an Ogilvy's department store, the first location in a shopping centre, Steinberg's, and a Woolworth's. A 1961 Ottawa Citizen article covering a mall expansion claimed "the new centre by its accessibility to through highways, will become not only one of the largest shopping plazas in the district but one of the finest in the country." The Ogilvy's store was rebranded as a Robinson's in 1984 after which it was replaced by discount retailer Zellers in 1996, by Target in 2013 and then by Walmart in 2016.

Billings Bridge Shopping Centre was converted into an enclosed mall in 1972. A twelve-storey office tower was also added during an expansion in 1975.

Billings Bridge Station opened on November 2, 1996, providing bus service via the southeast Transitway. It continues to serve as a major hub for OC Transpo bus services.

In the late 1990s, a "remerchandizing program" brought in a number of new stores to replace old ones and "provide the proper tenant mix to suit this particular trade area and the shopping centre's customer base." In 1998–99, a CA$7 million renovation was carried out to add a two-storey glass atrium as a main entrance and a new food court on the second floor. In July 2006, another major renovation program was started which expanded the mall by 25,000 sq ft (2,300 m^{2}).

In 2004, Brian Card, president of Corporate Research Group said, "Billings Bridge's proximity to public transit, office buildings and growing population centres has helped it to withstand competition from big-box power centres when other shopping centres have been hard-hit." Barry Nabatian, general manager of Market Research Corporation, argued that the South Keys Shopping Centre had taken the role as 'regional mall' in the south of Ottawa, as it was larger, more popular, and had higher sales/sq foot. A 2005 article by Ottawa Business Journal said that the "lack of a major anchor department store has kept it from becoming a regional centre." Today the mall is considered a 'community' shopping centre.
