= Clarke Fields Park =

Park in Ontario, Canada

Coordinates: 45°15′41″N 75°46′12″W

Clarke Fields Park is a park in the west end of Barrhaven, Ontario, Canada, located at 93 Houlahan Street. The park features several soccer fields, one baseball diamond, a playground, a bike path, and a BMX track. The park is currently maintained by the City of Ottawa.

Each year, Clarke Fields Park is the venue of two large community events. The annual Barrhaven Canada Day festivities and the Ottawa Oktoberfest. Both attract thousands of visitors from Barrhaven and the greater Ottawa community at large.

== Events ==
The Canada Day event, hosted by Mattamy Homes, features a midway with rides, games, and a large stage. The stage hosts local bands and artists from Barrhaven that play throughout the day, which is concluded with a large firework display in the evening.

Oktoberfest is held in early October each year. In 2014, the event featured a 21,600-square-foot beer tent.

== BMX track ==
On the outside of the park, next to Strandherd Drive, there is a BMX racing facility which opened during the summer of 2013. The Nepean BMX Association operates the BMX track, which hosts local races and practices on a weekly basis. The track is open to the public, unless there is a scheduled event.
