= Overbrook, Ottawa =

Coordinates: 45°25′30″N 75°39′20″W

Overbrook is an urban neighbourhood situated in Rideau-Rockcliffe Ward, in the east end of Ottawa, Ontario, Canada. It is located across the Rideau River from the neighbourhood of Sandy Hill and is just to the south of Vanier. To the east of Overbrook is the former City of Gloucester. It was constituted as a police village in 1922 and was annexed by the City of Ottawa in 1950.

== Geography ==
Overbrook covers an area of 3.04 square kilometres and has a population density of 3,174 people per square kilometre (2011 Census). Overbrook's main street is Queen Mary Street, which runs from North River Road to St. Laurent Boulevard. Although predominantly a residential neighbourhood at Overbrook's south end is Coventry Road where commercial and office buildings are found along with a major shopping centre (St. Laurent Centre) at the intersection with St. Laurent Boulevard.

The neighborhood of Overbrook is bounded on the north by the former City of Vanier, on the west by the Rideau River, on the south by provincial Highway 417 (the Queensway) and on the east by St. Laurent Boulevard. The eastern part of the community overlaps with the Castle Heights neighbourhood.

Overbrook is relatively close to downtown Ottawa and is seeing increased residential infill redevelopment. This is being aided by recent transportation connectivity improvements such as the 2015 opening of the Adàwe Crossing (pedestrian and cyclist bridge across the Rideau River) and the ability to use the Max Keeping Bridge (pedestrian and cyclist bridge over Highway 417) to access both Via Rail Ottawa station and the newer Tremblay station, which opened in 2019 on the O-Train Confederation Line.

== Demographics ==
The neighbourhood was in the fifth of 5 socio-economic levels, with 1 representing the most advantaged neighbourhood and 5 the least advantaged neighbourhood. A minority (36%) of the residents owned their homes, while 64% rented. Housing is unaffordable for many residents in West Overbrook; 32% spend more than 30% of their income on shelter. Eight percent of the dwellings were reported to be in need of major repairs (higher than city average). The number of persons per room (0.46), a measure of crowding, was also higher than the city average.

In 2005, the property crime rate of 66.4 per thousand people was higher than the city average of 57 per thousand people. Personal crime rates were also higher than the city average of 24 per thousand people, at 52.8 per thousand people. 2016 Census of Canada data indicate that knowledge of official languages has 47% of the population speaking English only and 47% speaking both English and French and the remaining 6% French only or neither English or French.

According to the 2011 Census, the community has a population of 9,650.

Roman Catholicism is the predominant religion, observed by 5,685 residents. Immigration, especially from Lebanon, has caused a continuing increase in residents with Muslim backgrounds; it is the second largest faith, encompassing 1,135 followers.

Ethnic group	Population 2016	% 2016
White	5,385	58%
Black	1,750	19%
Arab	870	9.5%
Indigenous	475	5%
South Asian	210	2.5%
Other ethnicity	525	5.5%
Total Population	9,215	100%

== See also ==
- List of Ottawa neighbourhoods
