= Strathcona Park (Ottawa) =

Park in Ottawa, Ontario, Canada

Coordinates: 45.426166°N 75.671682°W

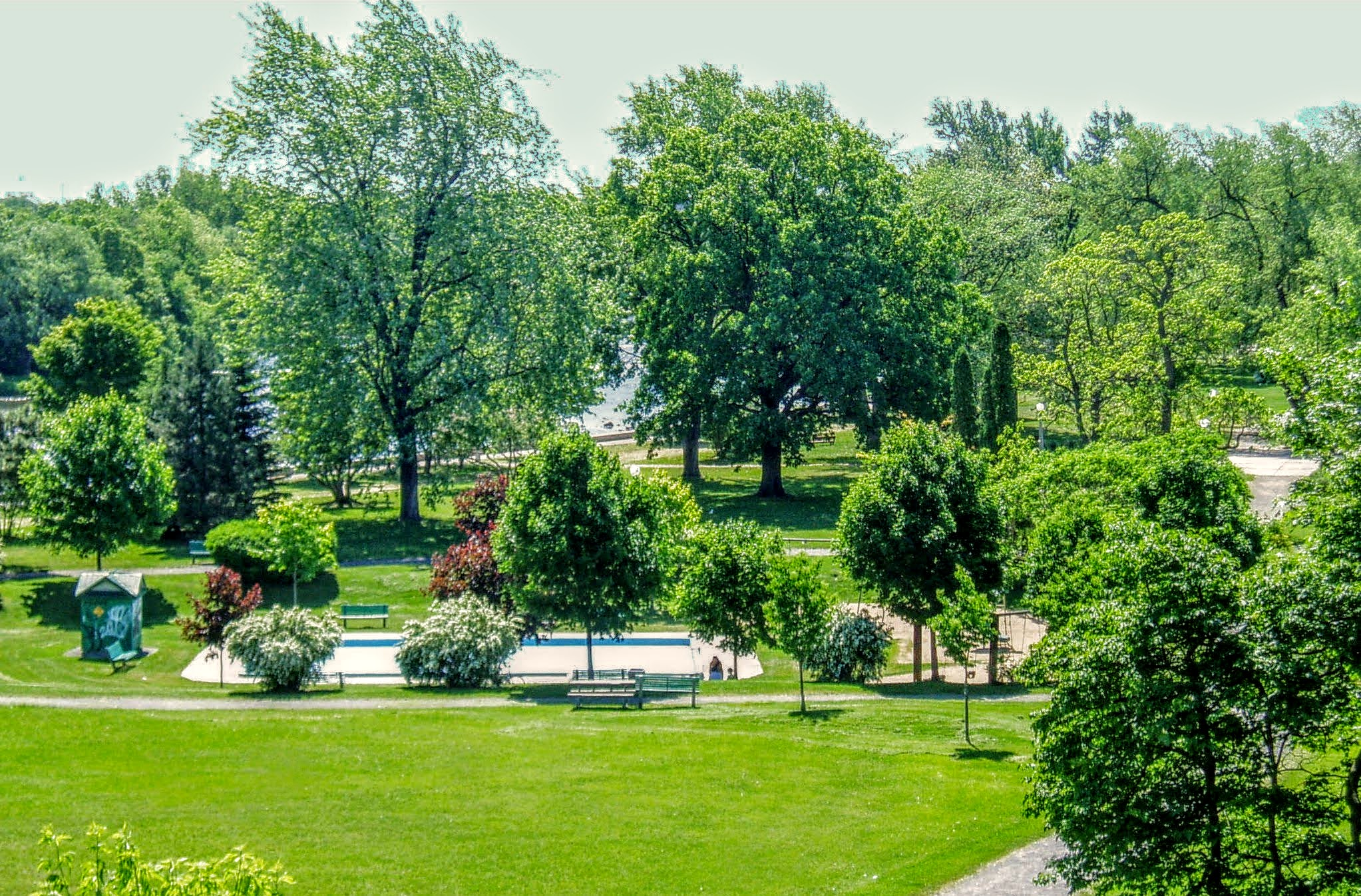
Strathcona Park looking southeast toward the river

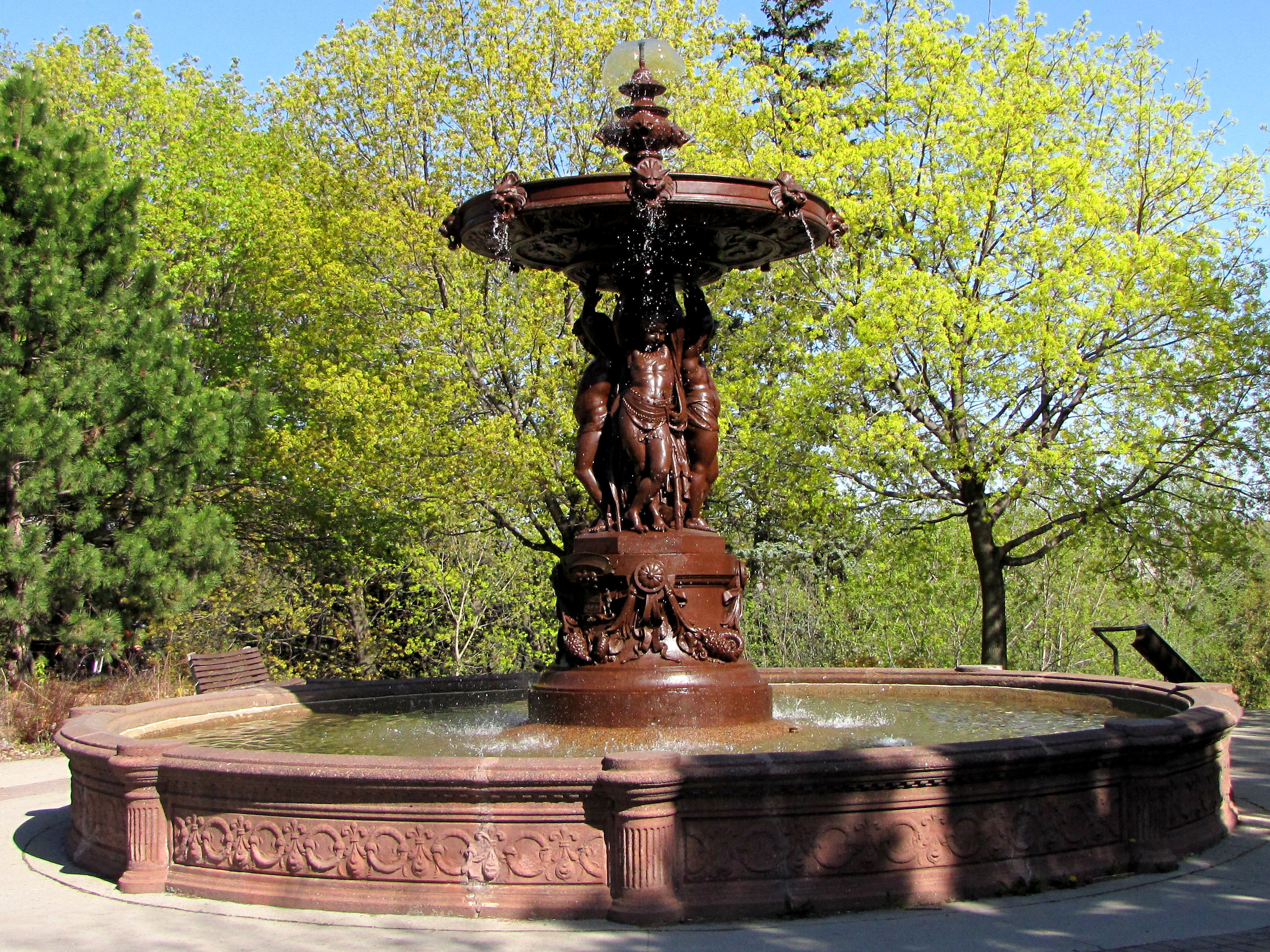
Lord Strathcona Fountain

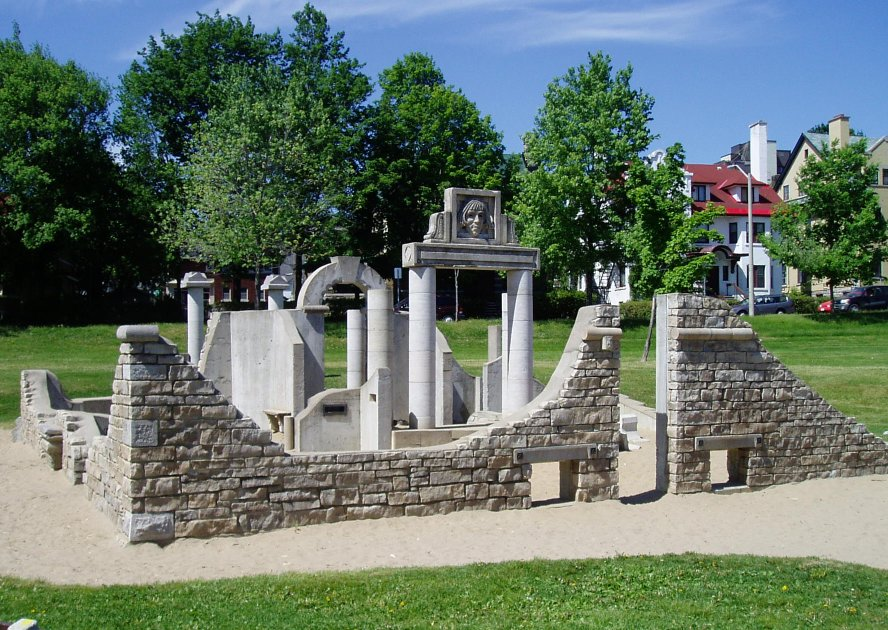
Stephen Brathwaite's ruinlike play structure

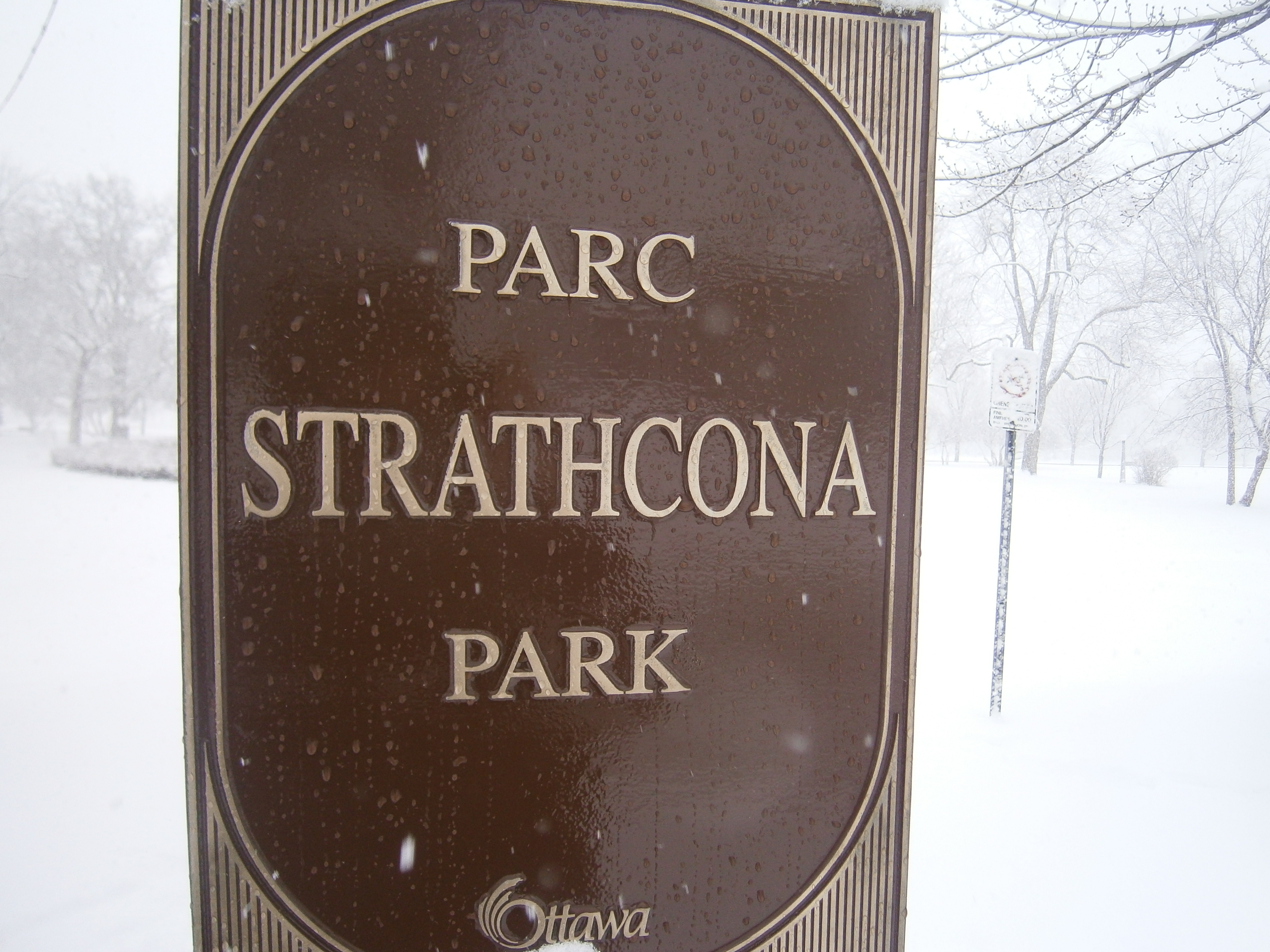
Bilingual sign in winter

Strathcona Park is a large park in Ottawa, Ontario, Canada. It lies on the west bank of the Rideau River and marks the eastern edge of the Sandy Hill neighbourhood.

The area of the park was originally the swampy floodplain of the river and impossible to build on. The site first became home of the Dominion Rifle Range, where soldiers had trained before departing for the Second Boer War. That history is preserved in the name of Range Road, which runs along the west of the park. The area was turned into a park by the Ottawa Improvement Commission between 1904 and 1907. It was named after Lord Strathcona, a Canadian businessman and politician who had financed his own regiment in the war.

The most prominent feature of the 15-acre (6.1 ha) park is the fountain atop the hill; it was donated by Lord Strathcona in 1909 and sculpted by French artist, Mathurin Moreau. The four upright figures symbolize the four continents (Europe, Asia, Africa, America), which was a commonly used artistic metaphor until the 19th century. A twin fountain stands in downtown Buenos Aires.

The park's original design was a classic example of English public park design. It contained a pair of small ponds, gazebos, and Ottawa's first golf course. In the 1940s, the ponds were filled in because of their expense and replaced with a wading pool. A baseball diamond was constructed at the southern end of the park in the 1920s and, for many years, was Ottawa's main venue for the sport.

The banks of the Rideau were once a popular swimming area, but the perception of pollution now make that unpopular. During the summer, the water level is low enough to ford the river and cross to Riverain Park in Vanier, but the Adàwe Crossing bridge, opened in December 2015, now makes fording the river unnecessary. Just to the south of Strathcona Park is Dutchy's Hole Park and Robinson Field. In the winter, the park, with its large hill at the northern end, is a popular site for tobogganing and making snowboard jumps.

The park remained under the control of the OIC successor agency the National Capital Commission until 1987, when it did not renew its lease with the city. Since then, the park has been managed by the municipality. In the early 1990s, the park was refurbished by the city. One of the most noted additions was the play structure designed by artist Stephen Brathwaite, who designed a structure to look like ruins and was inspired by Mackenzie King's ruin garden at Kingsmere. The structure was assembled out of blocks of stone that had been part of the Parliament buildings, the Chateau Laurier, and other prominent Ottawa structures.

Since 1986, the park has been home to Odyssey Theatre, a professional company that presents open-air plays each summer on a stage at the northeast corner of the park. Odyssey Theatre's unique performances of classical plays and original creations are inspired by the Italian commedia dell'arte and incorporate international forms of puppetry, clowning, and dance-theatre.

In July 2014, the city began construction of a pedestrian and cyclist bridge across the Rideau River to connect the Rideau River Eastern Pathway at Donald Street with Strathcona Park and Somerset Street East.

The park is surrounded by a series of large homes that once housed the elite of Ottawa. Most are now embassies, and the area around the park is often called Ottawa's Embassy Row. Perched above the park is the Russian embassy, formerly the Soviet Union embassy.
