= Ellwood, Ottawa =

Ellwood
- Neighbourhood
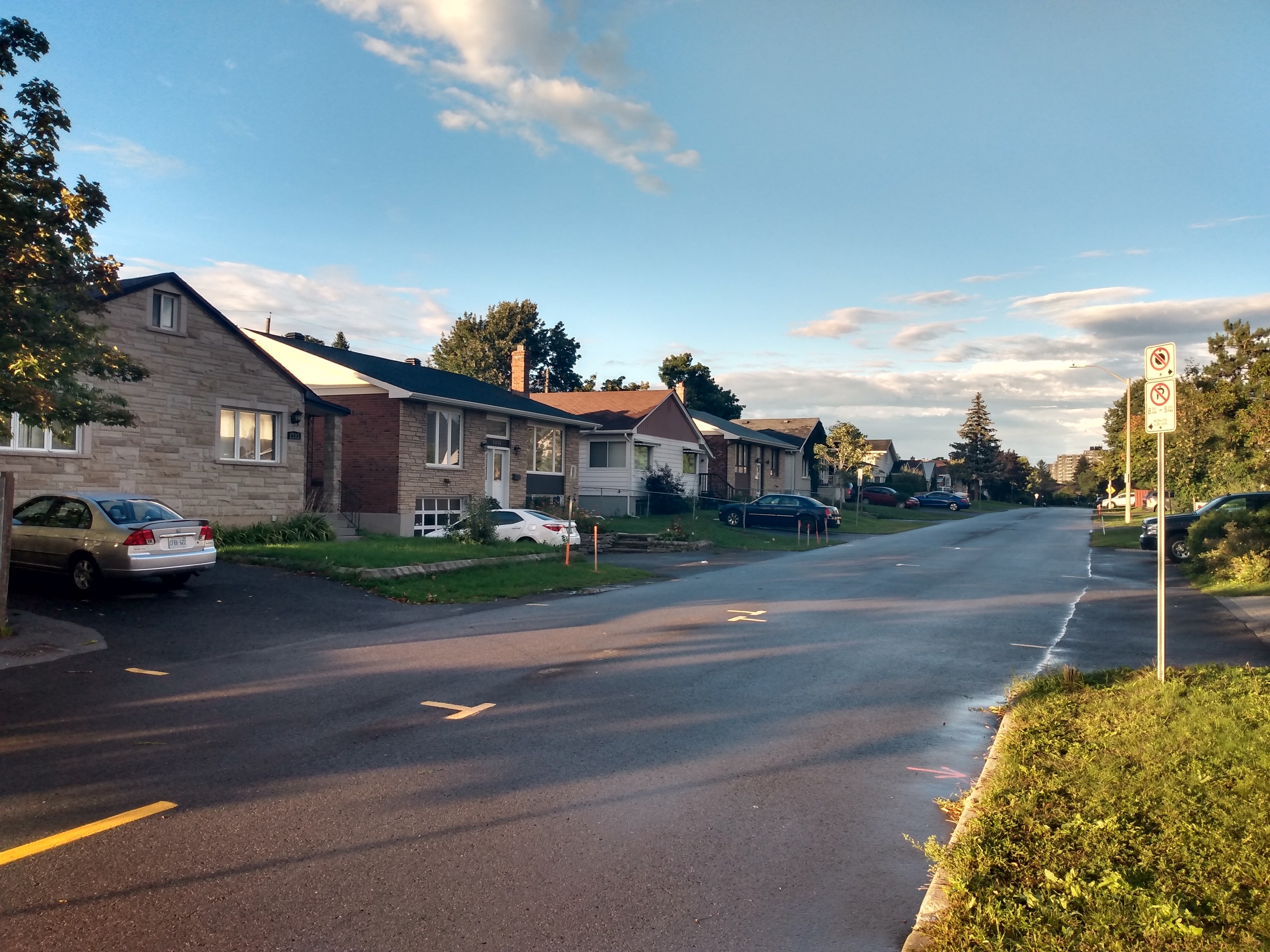
- Vancouver Avenue

- Location within Ottawa
- Coordinates: 45°22′10″N 75°39′30″W
- Country: Canada
- Province: Ontario
- City: Ottawa

Government
  - MPs: David McGuinty
  - MPPs: John Fraser
  - Councillors: Riley Brockington
  - Governing body: Ellwood Neighbourhood Association
- Elevation: 90 m (300 ft)
- Time zone: Eastern (EST)
- Forward sortation area: K1V
- Website: Neighbourhood Association

Ellwood is a neighbourhood and former railway point in River Ward, in the south end of Ottawa, Ontario, Canada. It is bounded by Walkley Road on the north, the Transitway on the west, Albion Road on the east, and Ledbury Park on the south. The population of this area is approximately 2908 (2011 Census).

== Railway junction ==
Until the 1970s, a railway junction existed behind the LCBO warehouse on Bank Street. From the 19th century until c. 1950 it was named Chaudiere Junction, at which point it was renamed Ellwood Junction.

== Post office ==
In 1906, a post office was established and was named Ellwood after two men who were instrumental in its development, Charles O. Wood and William Ellis. The post office was located just south of Ledbury on Bank Street and was operated by Jane Cutts (1846-1923) in the general store that she and her son George ran, which dated back to the 1870s. The post office closed in 1943.

== School ==
A school house, Gloucester School Section 3, was built in 1856 and was located on the site of an apartment building on Bank Street just north of Ledbury Avenue. It served Gloucester students of the area until 1956 and Ottawa Public School Board students for a year or two beyond that. It was used for private businesses until it was demolished in the 1980s.

== Railway station ==
A small railway station existed on the north side of Walkley Road, west of Bank Street where a shopping centre now stands. Passenger service was provided by the Canadian Pacific Railway until October 1957. The station was the scene of a four-car derailment on January 21, 1922 which claimed the life of engineer Howard Edward White and left twelve passengers hospitalized.

== Housing ==
During the pre–World War I land boom, subdivisions were registered covering the area between Walkley Road and Ledbury Avenue and between Bank Street and Albion Road. These were named Ridgemont Park and Paardeburgh Park (in honour of a Boer War battle). Only a small number of houses were built.

== Power ==
During the early 1930s, transmission towers were built between Kitchener Avenue and Ledbury Avenue.

== Hall ==
Around the start of World War II, a dance and reception hall named the Right Spot Inn was built on the corner of Ledbury Avenue and Bank Street and lasted for about 10 years.

== Development ==
As a result of the Greber Plan, the original village was expropriated in 1949 and 1950 to make room for the Walkley Railway Yards, the Bank Street overpass and a never built federal parkway. All the houses and other buildings with the exception of the school were either demolished or moved.

About this time, many houses began to be built in the earlier mentioned pre–World War I subdivisions except in the hydro and parkway corridors. This gave the community its current general appearance.
