= 2014 Ottawa municipal election =

Canadian municipal election

2014 Ottawa mayoral election
- October 27, 2014
- Turnout: 39.92% (▼ ~4.08pp)
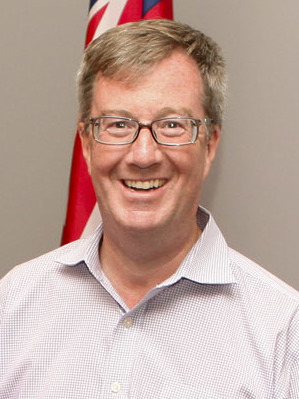
Candidate	Jim Watson	Mike Maguire
Popular vote	189,253	46,341
Percentage	76.20%	18.66%
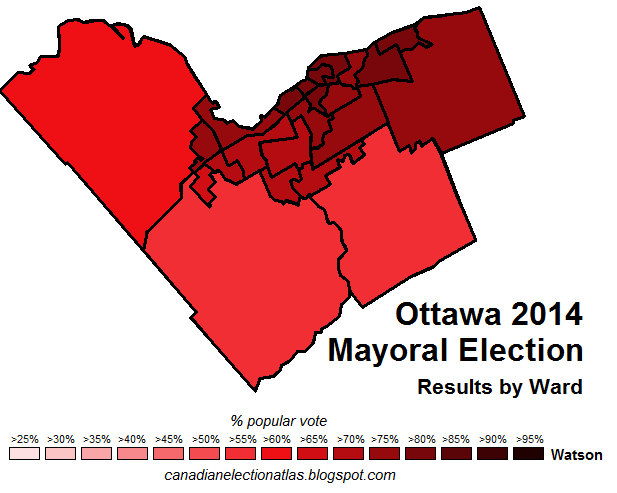
Mayor before election
Jim Watson
Elected mayor
Jim Watson

The 2014 Ottawa municipal election was a municipal election that was held on October 27, 2014, to elect the mayor of Ottawa, Ottawa City Council and the Ottawa-Carleton Public and Catholic School Boards. The election was held on the same day as elections in every other municipality in Ontario.

== Mayoral candidates ==
=== Bernard Couchman ===
Nominated July 23. Immigrant from Guyana; operates a marketing company.

=== Mike Maguire ===
2010 mayoral candidate Mike Maguire announced he was running for mayor and was nominated on January 7, 2014. He launched his official campaign on June 25

=== Rebecca Pyrah ===
Prostate cancer activist and Carleton University student. Nominated September 11.

=== Michael St. Arnaud ===
Ran for mayor in 2010, winning 0.07% of the vote. Nominated September 11.

=== Anwar Syed ===
Engineer born in Aurangabad, India and emigrated to Canada in 1999. Ran as an independent in the 2006 Canadian federal election in Ottawa Centre, placing sixth with 0.2%. He was nominated August 15.

=== Jim Watson ===
Mayor Jim Watson declared his intention and ran again for election. He was nominated on March 24 and launched his campaign on April 27.

=== Robert White ===
White was nominated for mayor in 2010 but dropped out after a month. He was nominated on June 27.

=== Darren W. Wood ===
Wood, originally from Niagara Falls, ran as an independent in the 1999 provincial election (in Niagara Falls). He also ran for mayor of Niagara Falls in 2003 and for Niagara Falls city council in 2006. Wood had been nominated to run for city council in Stittsville Ward, but was nominated for mayor on July 17.

=== Dropped out ===
==== Robert Gilles Gauthier ====
Ran for numerous offices including mayor in 1997 and 2010. He was nominated on April 29. He later dropped out of the running.

== Polls ==
Polling Date(s)	Firm	Jim Watson	Mike Maguire	Darren Wood	Anwar Syed	Other	Undecided	Source
Sept 18	Forum Research	44	17	1	3	5	30	PDF

== Mayoral results ==
Mayoral candidate	Vote	%
Jim Watson (X)	189,253	76.20
Mike Maguire	46,341	18.66
Anwar Syed	3,473	1.40
Rebecca Pyrah	2,840	1.14
Robert White	1,815	0.73
Darren W. Wood	1,764	0.71
Michael St. Arnaud	1,628	0.66
Bernard Couchman	1,255	0.51

Note: Colour corresponds to main campaign colour. "(X)" denotes incumbent.

=== Results by ward ===
Ward	Couchman	Maguire	Pyrah	St. Arnaud	Syed	Watson	White	Wood
Orléans	56	1935	127	125	92	10536	86	96
Innes	46	1735	113	141	120	10279	58	66
Barrhaven	68	2460	95	35	130	8379	69	78
Kanata North	41	1807	114	35	194	7726	79	67
West Carleton-March	24	2765	76	23	36	5251	68	86
Stittsville	29	2331	74	27	60	5745	63	53
Bay	73	2205	141	55	190	9140	95	78
College	70	2710	160	50	90	9627	112	104
Knoxdale-Merivale	47	2121	86	25	91	6946	66	61
Gloucester-Southgate	44	1742	108	73	406	8259	106	62
Beacon Hill-Cyrville	50	1336	106	85	87	6815	65	61
Rideau-Vanier	100	1041	246	211	162	8136	89	105
Rideau-Rockcliffe	93	1215	165	138	129	8138	100	90
Somerset	66	909	176	86	194	7563	73	101
Kitchissippi	56	1649	169	46	133	10979	66	68
River	65	1852	116	58	187	8501	85	68
Capital	53	998	140	41	142	7743	36	49
Alta Vista	56	1719	105	65	228	8766	72	74
Cumberland	64	1773	100	127	124	8845	110	96
Osgoode	28	3016	90	18	33	5002	85	78
Rideau-Goulbourn	19	3191	45	15	35	4771	32	36
Gloucester-South Nepean	32	1929	85	60	387	7848	72	63
Kanata South	38	2522	120	42	132	8444	72	75

== City Council ==
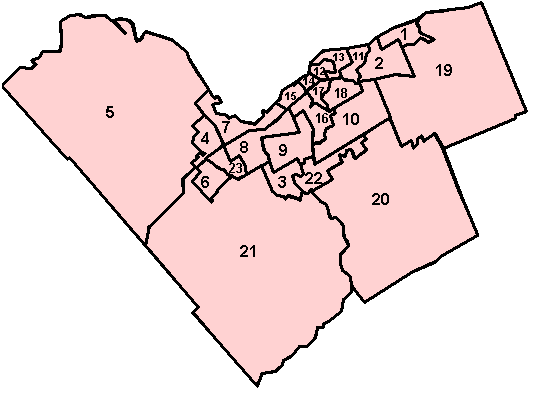
Map of Ottawa's Wards.: 1. Orléans Ward; 2. Innes Ward; 3. Barrhaven Ward; 4. Kanata North Ward; 5. West Carleton-March Ward; 6. Stittsville Ward; 7. Bay Ward; 8. College Ward; 9. Knoxdale-Merivale Ward; 10. Gloucester-Southgate Ward; 11. Beacon Hill-Cyrville Ward; 12. Rideau-Vanier Ward; 13. Rideau-Rockcliffe Ward; 14. Somerset Ward; 15. Kitchissippi Ward; 16. River Ward; 17. Capital Ward; 18. Alta Vista Ward; 19. Cumberland Ward; 20. Osgoode Ward; 21. Rideau-Goulbourn Ward; 22. Gloucester-South Nepean Ward; 23. Kanata South Ward.

=== Orléans Ward ===
Incumbent councillor Bob Monette ran for re-election.

Nominated:

- R. Gordon Jensen - retired naval officer
- Bob Monette - incumbent councillor
- Jennifer Robitaille - ran in this ward in 2010, winning 14%

Results:

Council candidate	Vote	%
Bob Monette (X)	10,662	75.47
Jennifer Robitaille	2,546	18.02
R. Gordon Jensen	919	6.51

=== Innes Ward ===
Incumbent councillor Rainer Bloess did not run for re-election.

Nominated:

- Laura Dudas - President of the Blackburn Community Association, former Ottawa Sun journalist, works for the City of Ottawa in corporate communications
- Chris Fraser - Ran in this Ward in 2010, finishing third with 12% of the vote.
- Eldon Holder
- Chantal Lecours - Conseil des écoles publiques de l'Est de l'Ontario trustee since 2004.
- Master Cpl. Jody Mitic - Candidate on The Amazing Race Canada.
- Andrew Modray
- Fred Sherwin - Former candidate in Orleans Ward in 2010.
- François Trépanier
- Teresa Whitmore - Former city councillor in Belleville, Ontario (2000-2003).

Dropped out:

- Mathieu Fortin
- Roland Stieda

Results:

Council candidate	Vote	%
Jody Mitic	4,294	33.01
Laura Dudas	2,535	19.49
François Trépanier	2,117	16.27
Fred Sherwin	1,974	15.18
Chantal Lecours	626	4.81
Eldon Holder	544	4.18
Teresa Whitmore	466	3.58
Chris Fraser	385	2.96
Andrew Modray	67	0.52

=== Barrhaven Ward ===
Incumbent councillor Jan Harder ran for re-election.

Nominated:

- Ian Bursey
- Jan Harder - incumbent councillor
- Syed Asghar Hussain

Results:

Council candidate	Vote	%
Jan Harder (X)	8,686	75.50
Ian Burrsey	2,490	21.64
Syed Asghar Hussain	328	2.85

=== Kanata North Ward ===
Incumbent councillor Marianne Wilkinson ran for re-election.

Nominated:

- Matt Muirhead - Teacher; Ran in this ward in 2006
- Jeff Seeton - Tech entrepreneur; Ran in this ward in 2006 and 2010
- Marianne Wilkinson - incumbent councillor

Results:

Council candidate	Vote	%
Marianne Wilkinson (X)	4,751	46.21
Matt Muirhead	3,467	33.72
Jeff Seeton	2,063	20.07

=== West Carleton-March Ward ===
Incumbent councillor Eli El-Chantiry ran for re-election.

Nominated:

- Alexander Aronec
- Eli El-Chantiry - incumbent councillor
- Brendan Gorman
- Jonathan Mark - former radio host on 106.9 FM (The Bear) ("Gonzo" with Kaz & Jay)
- James Parsons

Results:

Council candidate	Vote	%
Eli El-Chantiry (X)	4,808	56.87
Jonathan Mark	2,999	35.47
Brendan Gorman	270	3.19
James Parsons	193	2.28
Alexander Aronec	185	2.19

=== Stittsville Ward ===
Incumbent councillor Shad Qadri ran for re-election.

Nominated:

- David Lee
- Shad Qadri - incumbent councillor

Results:

Council candidate	Vote	%
Shad Qadri (X)	5,182	60.94
David Lee	3,322	39.06

=== Bay Ward ===
Incumbent councillor Mark Taylor ran for re-election.

Nominated:

- Alex Cullen - former city councillor for this ward
- George Guirguis
- Brendan Mertens
- Michael Pastien
- Trevor Robinson
- Mark Taylor - incumbent

Results:

Council candidate	Vote	%
Mark Taylor (X)	5,750	46.75
Alex Cullen	5,276	42.89
George Guirguis	498	4.05
Trevor Robinson	482	3.92
Michael Pastien	151	1.23
Brendan Mertens	143	1.16

=== College Ward ===
Incumbent councillor Rick Chiarelli ran for re-election.

Nominated:

- Guy Annable
- Rick Chiarelli - incumbent councillor
- Craig MacAulay
- Scott Andrew McLarens

Dropped out:

- Basil Swedani

Results:

Council candidate	Vote	%
Rick Chiarelli (X)	9,601	70.39
Guy Annable	2,084	15.28
Craig MacAulay	1,065	7.81
Scott Andrew McLarens	889	6.52

=== Knoxdale-Merivale Ward ===
Incumbent councillor Keith Egli ran for re-election.

Nominated:

- Keith Egli - incumbent councillor
- Cristian Lambiri - engineering manager

Results:

Council candidate	Vote	%
Keith Egli (X)	7,128	73.22
Cristian Lambiri	2,607	26.78

=== Gloucester-Southgate Ward ===
Incumbent councillor Diane Deans ran for re-election.

Nominated:

- Meladul Haq Ahmadzai
- Rodaina Chahrour
- Diane Deans - incumbent councillor
- George Marko
- Lilly Obina
- Brad Pye - Federal NDP candidate in Dartmouth—Cole Harbour in 2008.
- Mohamed Roble - reserve medic in the Canadian Forces

Results:

Council candidate	Vote	%
Diane Deans (X)	6,251	56.27
Lilly Obina	2,397	21.58
Brad Pye	963	8.67
Rodaina Chahrour	952	8.57
Mohamed Roble	401	3.61
George Marko	102	0.92
Meladul Haq Ahmadzai	43	0.39

=== Beacon Hill-Cyrville Ward ===
Incumbent councillor Tim Tierney ran for re-election.

Nominated:

- Francesca D'Ambrosio
- Nicolas Séguin
- Tim Tierney - incumbent councillor
- Michel Tardif
- Rene Tessier

Results:

Council candidate	Vote	%
Tim Tierney (X)	7,162	82.11
Michel Tardif	518	5.94
Francesca D'Ambrosio	433	4.96
Nicolas Séguin	421	4.83
Rene Tessier	188	2.16

=== Rideau-Vanier Ward ===
Incumbent councillor Mathieu Fleury ran for re-election.

Nominated:

- George Atanga
- Marc Aubin - former president of the Lowertown Community Association
- Mathieu Fleury - incumbent councillor
- Catherine Fortin LeFaivre - communications director at a national not-for-profit
- David George Oldham
- Marc Vinette

Dropped out

- Jeff Pierce

Results:

Council candidate	Vote	%
Mathieu Fleury (X)	5,526	51.54
Marc Aubin	3,571	33.31
Catherine Fortin LeFaivre	1,362	12.70
David-George Oldham	102	0.95
George Atanga	81	0.76
Marc Vinette	79	0.74

=== Rideau-Rockcliffe Ward ===
Incumbent councillor Peter D. Clark ran for re-election.

Nominated:

- Peter D. Clark - incumbent councillor
- Cam Holmstrom - Metis resident of ward, Teacher, Legislative Assistant to Quebec NDP MP Romeo Saganash
- Jevone Nicholas - Former president of the Vanier Community Association, and federal public servant
- Tobi Nussbaum - public servant
- Sheila Perry - former Overbrook Community Association President
- Penny Thompson

Dropped out:

- Marc Belisle

Results:

Council candidate	Vote	%
Tobi Nussbaum	4,846	47.19
Peter D. Clark (X)	1,871	18.22
Sheila Perry	1,423	13.86
Penny Thompson	994	9.68
Jevone Nicholas	846	8.24
Cam Holmstrom	290	2.82

=== Somerset Ward ===
Incumbent councillor Diane Holmes retired.

Nominated:

- Martin Canning - Consultant and environmentalist
- Edward Conway - Lawyer
- Catherine McKenney - Former aide to the deputy city manager, former assistant to Holmes.
- Thomas McVeigh - Former head of the Centretown Citizens Community Association
- Conor Meade - Entrepreneur
- Jeff Morrison - Former president of the Centretown Community Health Centre
- Sandro Provenzano
- Silviu Riley - IT worker
- Denis Schryburt - Gay-community activist
- Curtis Tom
- Lili V. Weemen

Dropped out:

- Diane Holmes - incumbent councillor

Results:

Council candidate	Vote	%
Catherine McKenney	3,997	40.13
Jeff Morrison	1,681	16.88
Martin Canning	1,631	16.38
Conor Meade	807	8.10
Edward Conway	576	5.78
Thomas McVeigh	434	4.36
Lili V. Weemen	292	3.94
Denis Schryburt	223	2.24
Sandro Provenzano	99	0.99
Curtis Tom	77	0.77
Silviu Riley	43	0.43

=== Kitchissippi Ward ===
Incumbent councillor Katherine Hobbs ran for re-election.

Nominated:

- Katherine Hobbs - incumbent councillor
- Jeff Leiper - Former president of the Hintonburg Community Association
- Ellen Lougheed
- Michelle Reimer
- Larry Wasslen

Dropped out:

- Dovi Chein

Results:

Council candidate	Vote	%
Jeff Leiper	7,557	55.36
Katherine Hobbs (X)	4,197	30.75
Michelle Reimer	1,530	11.21
Ellen Lougheed	272	1.99
Larry Wasslenn	95	0.70

=== River Ward ===
Incumbent councillor Maria McRae did not run for re-election.

Nominated:

- Riley Brockington - Former Ottawa-Carleton District School Board Trustee
- Barbara Carroll
- Don Francis - Former Ottawa Board of Education Trustee
- Antonio Giannetti
- Jeff Koscik
- Michael Kostiuk - Former President of the Carlington Community Association
- Mike Patton - Ontario Progressive Conservative Party candidate in the 2007 Ontario general election in Ottawa West—Nepean (provincial electoral district) and former staffer for former mayor Larry O'Brien
- Colin Pennie
- Vanessa Nicki Sutton
- Bruce Winchester

Results:

Council candidate	Vote	%
Riley Brockington	3,997	36.38
Vanessa Nicki Sutton	1,897	17.27
Mike Patton	1,427	12.99
Barbara Carroll	1,270	11.56
Antonio Giannetti	1,032	9.39
Michael Kostiuk	614	5.59
Jeff Koscik	239	2.18
Don Francis	227	2.07
Colin Pennie	171	1.56
Bruce Winchester	112	1.02

=== Capital Ward ===
Incumbent councillor David Chernushenko ran for re-election.

Nominated:

- Scott Blurton
- David Chernushenko - incumbent councillor
- Espoir Manirambona - Communist Party of Ontario candidate in Ottawa South in the 2014 Ontario general election.

Results:

Council candidate	Vote	%
David Chernushenko (X)	7,206	77.35
Scott Blurton	1,788	19.19
Espoir Manirambona	322	3.46

=== Alta Vista Ward ===
Incumbent councillor Peter Hume did not run for re-election.

Nominated:

- Adam Bowick
- Daher Muse Calin
- Jean Cloutier - Canterbury Community Association President
- Clinton Cowan - 2010 candidate in this ward. South East Ottawa Community Health Centre Vice-President and former Chair of the Community Relations Committee. Alta Vista Community Association, Director.
- Jeff Dubois
- Hussein Mahmoud
- Perry Marleau - candidate in this ward in 2006.
- John Redins - Party for People with Special Needs candidate in Ottawa South in the 2014 provincial election, 2013 by-election and 2011 provincial election.
- Brandon Scharfe

Dropped out:

- Peter Hume - incumbent councillor
- Douglas William Smith

Results:

Council candidate	Vote	%
Jean Cloutier	5,295	47.37
Clinton Cowan	3,287	29.40
Hussein Mahmoud	1,600	14.31
Daher Muse Calin	263	2.35
Brandon Scharfe	195	1.74
Jeff Dubois	169	1.51
Perry Marleau	159	1.42
Adam Bowick	112	1.00
John Redins	99	0.89

=== Cumberland Ward ===
Incumbent councillor Stephen Blais ran for re-election.

Nominated:

- Stephen Blais - incumbent councillor
- Marc Belisle (originally running in Rideau-Rockcliffe)

Dropped out:

- Troy Dubé

Results:

Council candidate	Vote	%
Stephen Blais (X)	9,446	78.03
Marc Belisle	2,659	21.97

=== Osgoode Ward ===
Incumbent councillor Doug Thompson declined to run for re-election.

Nominated:

- George Darouze
- Tom Dawson
- Davis Jermacans
- Jean Johnston-McKitterick
- Liam Maguire, brother of mayoral candidate Mike Maguire
- Bob Masaro
- Allen Scantland
- Mark Scharfe
- Kim Sheldrick
- Paul St. Jean
- George Wright

Dropped out:

- Justin Campbell
- Bruce Faulkner

Results:

Council candidate	Vote	%
George Darouze	1,783	21.06
George Wright	1,309	15.46
Jean Johnston-McKitterick	1,158	13.68
Liam Maguire	1,146	13.54
Tom Dawson	1,097	12.96
Davis Jermacans	1,064	12.57
Mark Scharfe	327	3.86
Kim Sheldrick	293	3.46
Bob Masaro	215	2.54
Paul St. Jean	45	0.53
Allen Scantland	28	0.33

=== Rideau-Goulbourn Ward ===
Incumbent councillor Scott Moffatt ran for re-election.

Nominated

- Scott Moffatt
- Dan Scharf

Results:

Council candidate	Vote	%
Scott Moffatt (X)	5,137	62.26
Daniel Scharf	3,114	37.74

=== Gloucester-South Nepean Ward ===
Incumbent councillor Steve Desroches did not run for re-election.

Nominated:

- Kevin Fulsom - day trader and writer/producer for a small video game company. Past volunteer for the Ontario NDP. Grandson of former mayor George Nelms and nephew of former Progressive Conservative MPP Frank Klees.
- Scott Hodge - president of the Riverside South Community Association
- Jason Kelly - local business owner
- Michael Qaqish - former aide for councillor Desroches.
- Bader Rashed - Owner of Canada Capital Cleaners Inc.
- Roger Scharfe
- Susan Sherring - Ottawa Sun columnist.

Dropped out:

- Michael Falardeau

Results:

Council candidate	Vote	%
Michael Qaqish	4,138	38.58
Jason Kelly	1,942	18.11
Susan Sherring	1,854	17.29
Scott Hodge	1,630	15.20
Bader Rashed	1,040	9.70
Roger Scharfe	63	0.59
Kevin Fulsom	59	0.55

=== Kanata South Ward ===
Incumbent councillor Allan Hubley ran for re-election.

Nominated

- David Abuwa
- Allan Hubley - incumbent councillor
- Bruce Anthony Faulkner

Results:

Council candidate	Vote	%
Allan Hubley (X)	9,710	84.69
Bruce Anthony Faulkner	1,362	11.88
David Abuwa	394	3.44

== School Board Trustee ==
=== Ottawa Catholic School Board ===
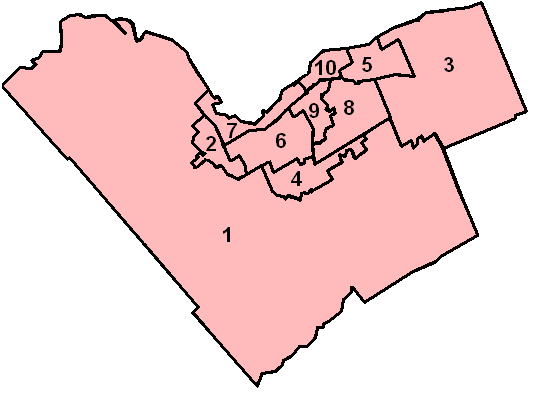
Zone map

Zone 1	Vote	%
John Curry (X)	4,034	54.92
Ken Gordon	1,398	19.03
Christine Pastien	1,339	18.23
Martin Tate	574	7.81

Zone 2	Vote	%
Sandra Moore	2,464	56.04
Tom Dewar	1,933	43.96

Zone 3	Vote	%
Brian Coburn (X)	3,256	67.57
Ellen Faddoul	1,563	32.43

Zone 4	Vote	%
Andrea Steenbakkers	2,044	37.94
Spencer Warren	1,781	33.05
Greg Deernsted	1,563	29.01

Zone 5	Vote	%
Joanne MacEwan (X)	Acclaimed	

Zone 6	Vote	%
Elaine McMahon	2,319	45.86
Julia Muggeridge	1,706	33.74
Andrew Beattie	1,032	20.41

Zone 7	Vote	%
Betty-Ann Kealey (X)	1,816	56.35
Kevin J. O'Shaughnessy	848	26.31
John McNally	559	17.34

Zone 8	Vote	%
Mark D. Mullan (X)	2,019	52.46
Chris Kelly	1,830	47.54

Zone 9	Vote	%
Kathy Ablett (X)	2,322	77.63
Jason Renaud	669	22.37

Zone 10	Vote	%
Thérèse Maloney Cousineau (X)	1,347	53.41
O'Neil Brooke	1,175	46.59

=== Ottawa-Carleton District School Board ===
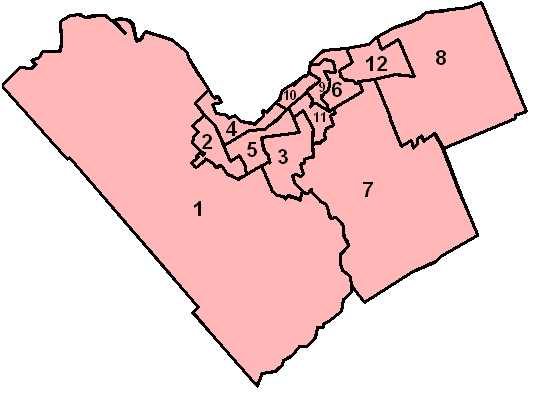
OCDSB Zone Map

Zone 1	Vote	%
Lynn Scott (X)	8,225	49.98
Sue Grant	5,423	32.95
Todd Johnson	1,982	12.04
Andrea Ingham	828	5.03

Zone 2	Vote	%
Christine Boothby (X)	Acclaimed	

Zone 3	Vote	%
Donna Blackburn (X)	8,597	68.08
Kimberly Bouffard	2,000	15.84
Chi Siu	1,202	9.52
Ashok Kumar Kalra	828	6.56

Zone 4	Vote	%
Theresa Kavanagh (X)	6,906	81.16
Calvin Palen	1,603	18.84

Zone 5	Vote	%
Anita Olsen Harper	3,792	45.18
David Foltin	2,451	29.20
Jeremy Wittet	2,150	25.62

Zone 6	Vote	%
Chris Ellis	10,456	90.60
Talis-Ilmars Brauns	1,085	9.40

Zone 7	Vote	%
Mark Fisher (X)	9,493	54.08
Jennifer Jennekens	3,366	19.18
Lori Daneliak	3,049	17.37
Jerrett DeFazio	1,200	6.84
Curtis Bulatovich	446	2.54

Zone 8	Vote	%
Keith Penny	4,665	45.81
Virginia Quinn	3,793	37.24
Pat Ready	1,726	16.95

Zone 9	Vote	%
Shawn Menard	Acclaimed	

Zone 10	Vote	%
Erica Braunovan	8,633	59.44
Guy Hughes	2,073	14.27
Daniel Nugent	1,578	10.86
Colin Leger	1,333	9.18
Idris Ben-Tahir	908	6.25

Zone 11	Vote	%
Shirley Seward (X)	4,145	58.71
Jeff Scullion	2,046	28.98
Sylvia Martin	869	12.31

Zone 12	Vote	%
Sandra Schwartz	5,991	62.32
Michael Urminsky	2,421	25.18
Peter Heyck	1,201	12.49

=== Conseil des écoles catholiques du Centre-Est ===
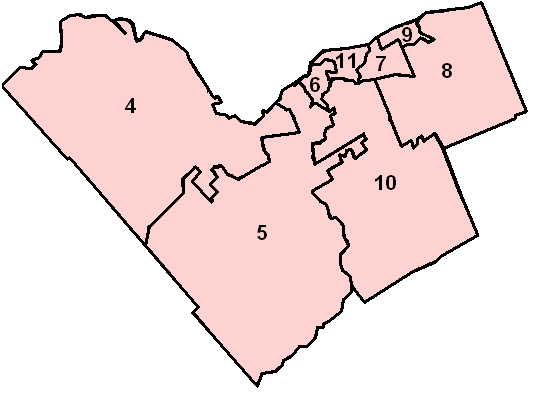
Zone map

Zone 4	Vote	%
André Thibodeau (X)	1,182	66.22
Jacques Boyer	603	33.78

Zone 5	Vote	%
Chad Mariage (X)	Acclaimed	

Zone 6	Vote	%
Diane Doré (X)	Acclaimed	

Zone 7	Vote	%
Brigitte Pilon (X)	Acclaimed	

Zone 8	Vote	%
Dan Boudria (X)	Acclaimed	

Zone 9	Vote	%
Johanne Lacombe (X)	Acclaimed	

Zone 10	Vote	%
Monique Briand (X)	2,586	72.13
Patrick Twagirayezu	999	27.87

Zone 11	Vote	%
Denis Poirier (X)	Acclaimed	

=== Conseil des écoles publiques de l'Est de l'Ontario ===
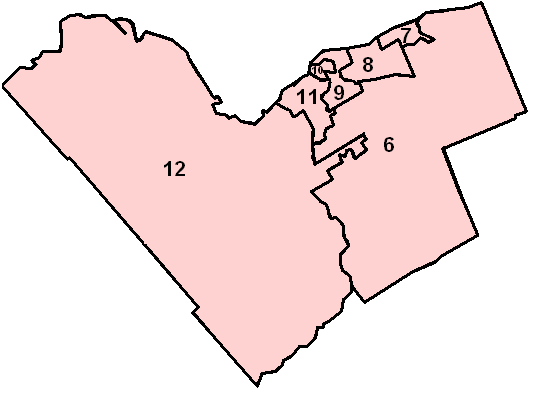
Zone map

Zone 6	Vote	%
Georges Orfali (X)	1,063	82.34
Ahmed Bouragba	228	17.66

Zone 7	Vote	%
Denis M. Chartrand (X)	930	84.70
Zenab Ismaël Ahmed	168	15.30

Zone 8	Vote	%
Marc Roy	1,027	51.89
Mathieu Fortin	952	48.11

Zone 9	Vote	%
Marielle Godbout (X)	988	77.13
Richard St-Jean	293	22.87

Zone 10	Vote	%
Lucille Collard (X)	2,147	87.88
Ajà Besler	296	12.12

Zone 11	Vote	%
Jean-Paul Lafond (X)	1,023	57.31
Myriam Hebabi	620	34.73
Mohamed Habaneh Egeh	142	7.96

Zone 12	Vote	%
Linda Savard (X)	1,006	82.87
Patricia Chehadé	208	17.13
