= Shawn Little =

Canadian municipal politician (1964–2012)

Ottawa City Councillor
- In office 1998–2006
- Preceded by: Joan Wong
- Succeeded by: Christine Leadman
- Constituency: Kitchissippi Ward

Personal details
- Born: Shawn William Little; October 16, 1964 Ottawa, Ontario, Canada
- Died: November 24, 2012 (aged 48) Cuba

Shawn William Little (October 16, 1964 – November 24, 2012) was a political consultant and City Councillor in Ottawa, Ontario, Canada, for the urban Kitchissippi Ward, consisting of neighbourhoods west of the City Centre. He was born in Ottawa and raised in its Westboro neighbourhood, where he attended Woodroffe Avenue and Broadview Public elementary schools followed by Nepean High School. He earned a bachelor's degree in history and political science from Carleton University, and a diploma in health sciences from Humber College. He wrote articles for the Newswest community paper in its early days. He died in November 2012 while vacationing in Cuba.

== Political career ==
Little was involved in politics from a young age as a member of the provincial Ontario and Federal Progressive Conservative parties. He worked for Progressive Conservative MP Walter Baker when he was 16 years old. He first ran for election in Goulbourn outside of Ottawa in 1988 at age 24.

Little ran in newly formed Kitchissippi Ward (which included the former Elmdale and Queensboro Wards and finished second to incumbent Joan Wong. He helped lead the effort to oppose the National Capital Commission (NCC) plan to widen the Champlain Bridge, and was a local community leader, volunteer and activist for local organizations, charities and community service groups. Little served as the founding president of the revamped Westboro Community Association, served as a board member for the not-for-profit community-based publication Newswest and president of the Westboro Kiwanis Club. He also helped develop and worked with several initiatives reaching out to marginalized youth. As one friend put it: "He talked about the importance of reaching out to youth and getting involved with them before they go down the wrong path".

== Ottawa city council ==
On his second attempt, in 1997, for a seat on City Council Little was elected to represent Kitchissippi. Elected at age 33, Little was one of the youngest councillors in Ottawa's history (that honour now belongs to Rideau-Vanier councillor Mathieu Fleury, who was elected at age 25). He represented the City at the World Capitals Forum in Tapei, Taiwan in 1997 and was elected to the national Board of Directors as an Ontario Director for the Federation of Canadian Municipalities. In his community, he was known to be a fiscally conservative and socially progressive politician.

During his subsequent nine year council career (1997–2006), Little chaired the city's Licence Committee and Animal Control Tribunal, was vice-chair of the Planning Committee and was a member of the Community and Protective Services Committee, Agriculture and Rural Affairs Committee, the city's Task Force on Property Tax Reform and the Priorities and Planning and Budget Committee. He served as a member of the Board of the Ottawa Civic Hospital, a Trustee for the Ottawa Public Library, on the Board of the Westboro Business Improvement Association, Ottawa Board of Health, and as a City Council liaison to the Ottawa Youth Cabinet.

== Second term ==
In 2000 the former City of Ottawa and surrounding municipalities and townships amalgamated to form the new City of Ottawa. Little again ran for election to represent Kitchissippi Ward against Regional Council member Linda Davis. During the campaign Little supported plans to build a new Loblaws store in the area. The race was one of the most bitter in the city with Little's supporters accused of stealing lawn signs while Davis was accused of leaking libellous, frivolous and fictional material to Frank magazine. Little defeated Davis with close to 50% of votes cast compared to Davis's 40%. Little was one of only three councillors from the former City of Ottawa re-elected to the newly amalgamated Council.

== Third term and later career ==
At the 2003 elections Councillor Little sought re-election for a third term. The race attracted many challengers, including Linda Davis. Little was re-elected, receiving a 27% plurality. Little had decided to stand as a candidate in the 2006 municipal election, but had a change of heart before the elections took place, noting that he had accomplished all of the important goals for the area he set for himself when he first ran for office and endorsed candidate Christine Leadman instead. One of these goals was revitalizing Hintonburg, a neighbourhood that once had 67 known problem rental properties, and drug issues among its population. After leaving politics in 2006, Little managed an Ottawa-based tech company until 2010.

In August 2010, Little returned to politics as a candidate in Ottawa's 2010 municipal elections for the Bay Ward, which was held by incumbent Alex Cullen. Although Little came in fifth place behind candidate Terry Kilrea, Cullen was defeated. At the time of his death, Little lived in Calgary, Alberta where he managed his own political consulting company and remained active in political affairs.

Preceded by Joan Wong	City councillors from Kitchissippi Ward; 1997-2006	Succeeded by Christine Leadman
