= Kitchissippi Ward =

Kitchissippi
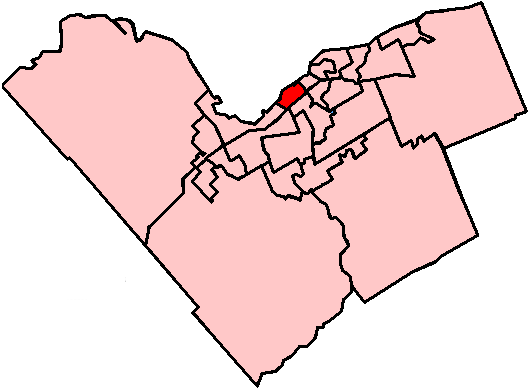
- Location within Ottawa
- Coordinates: 45°24′N 75°45′W
- Country: Canada
- Province: Ontario
- City: Ottawa

Government
  - Councillor: Joanne Chianello

Population (2016)Canada 2016 Census
  - Total: 38,640

Languages (2016)
  - English: 77.0%
  - French: 9.9%
  - Mandarin: 1.2%
  - Italian: 1.2%
  - Arabic: 1.1%

Kitchissippi Ward (Ward 15) is a city ward in the city of Ottawa, Ontario, Canada. It gets its name from the Algonquin name for the Ottawa River, meaning Great River. The ward is slightly west of downtown, and covers the neighbourhoods of Champlain Park, Civic Hospital, Hampton Park, Highland Park, Hintonburg, Island Park, McKellar Heights, McKellar Park, Mechanicsville, Westboro Beach, Westboro, Wellington Village, and Wellington Street West.

The ward is represented by Councillor Joanne Chianello.

The ward was created in 1994 from parts of Queensboro Ward, Richmond Ward and Elmdale Ward. It was known as just Ward 7 until given the Kitchissippi name in 1995.

== City councillors ==
1. Joan Wong (1994-1997)
2. Shawn Little (1997-2006)
3. Christine Leadman (2006-2010)
4. Katherine Hobbs (2010-2014)
5. Jeff Leiper (2014–2026)
6. Joanne Chianello (2026–present)

== Population data ==
The Ward's estimated population will be 38,900 in 2006. At the Canada 2001 Census it had 36,795 people.

Languages (mother tongue)

1. English: 54.5%
2. French: 15.6%
3. Arabic: 7.9%
4. Spanish: 1.8%
5. Chinese: 1.1% (inc. Mandarin, Cantonese and Chinese)
6. Italian: 1.1%

Religion

1. Roman Catholic: 36.2%
2. No religion: 21.4%
3. United Church of Canada: 10.2%
4. Anglican: 9.9%
5. Muslim: 3.2%
6. Jewish: 2.6%
7. Presbyterian: 2.5%
8. Buddhist: 1.6%
9. Baptist: 1.6%
10. Lutheran: 1.0%

Income

- Average household income: $70,307
- Average income (male): $46,904
- Average income (female): $33,443

== Election results ==
=== 2026 Ottawa municipal election ===
2026 Ottawa municipal election: Kitchissippi
Candidate	Popular vote			Expenditures
Candidate	Votes	%	±%	Expenditures
Joanne Chianello	10,722	65.20		
Subhir Uppal	2,711	16.48		
Brian Innes	2,652	16.13		
Xavier Commerford	361	2.20		
Total valid votes	16,907			
Total rejected, unmarked and declined votes				
Turnout		48.68		
Eligible voters	34,729			
Note: Candidate campaign colours are based on the prominent colour used in campaign items (signs, literature, etc.) and are used as a visual differentiation between candidates.

=== 2022 Ottawa municipal election ===
City council
Candidate	Vote	%
Jeff Leiper	11,055	71.97
Oonagh Fitzgerald	3,247	21.14
Dan Stringer	1,058	6.89

=== 2018 Ottawa municipal election ===
City council
Candidate	Vote	%
Jeff Leiper	12,068	85.28
Daniel Stringer	2,083	14.72

=== 2014 Ottawa municipal election ===
City council
Candidate	Vote	%
Jeff Leiper	7,557	55.36
Katherine Hobbs	4,197	30.75
Michelle Reimer	1,530	11.21
Ellen Lougheed	272	1.99
Larry Wasslenn	95	0.70

Ottawa mayor (Ward results)
Candidate	Vote	%
Jim Watson	10,979	83.39
Mike Maguire	1,649	12.52
Rebecca Pyrah	169	1.28
Anwar Syed	133	1.01
Darren W. Wood	68	0.52
Robert White	66	0.50
Bernard Couchman	56	0.43
Michael St. Arnaud	46	0.35

=== 2010 Ottawa municipal election ===
Candidate	Votes	%
Katherine Hobbs	6116	44.18
Christine Leadman	5540	40.02
Daniel Stringer	2186	15.79

=== 2006 Ottawa municipal election ===
Candidate	Votes	%
Christine Leadman	5949	41.12
Gary Ludington	4571	31.59
Vicky Smallman	3576	24.72
Daniel Narwa	372	2.57

Dropped Out

- Daniel Stringer
- Shawn Little

=== 2003 Ottawa municipal election ===
City council
Candidate	Votes	%
Shawn Little	2907	27.12
Kris Klein	2330	21.74
Gary Ludington	2217	20.68
Linda Davis	1540	14.37
Daniel Stringer	1058	9.87
David McConnell	625	5.83
Les Gangé	42	0.39

=== 2000 Ottawa municipal election ===
City council
Candidate	Votes	%
Shawn Little	5721	47.32
Linda Davis	4845	40.07
Ray Kostuch	1525	12.61

=== 1997 elections ===
City council
Candidate	Votes	%
Shawn Little	2,968	35.03
Paul Copeland	1,809	21.35
Andre Vertes	1,605	18.94
Brenda Parris	851	10.04
Linda Kitchikeesic Juden	822	9.70
Michael Kostiuk	253	2.99
Michael Bartholomew	165	1.95

Regional council
Candidate	Votes	%
Linda Davis	4,440	49.84
Joan Wong	3,779	42.42
Diana Brebner	690	7.74

=== 1994 elections ===
City council
Candidate	Votes	%
Joan Wong (X)	5,052	46.03
Shawn Little	3,643	33.19
David Goldstein	2,281	20.78

Regional council
Candidate	Votes	%
Linda Davis	4,071	37.64
Marian Lothian	3,579	33.09
Art Pope	3,166	29.27
