= Christine Leadman =

Canadian politician (born 1951/52)

Ottawa City Councillor
- In office 2006–2010
- Preceded by: Shawn Little
- Succeeded by: Katherine Hobbs
- Constituency: Kitchissippi Ward

Personal details
- Born: 1951 or 1952 (age 73–74)
- Spouse: Jack "Silver" Water
- Website: City of Ottawa

Christine Louise Leadman was a city councillor in Ottawa, Canada. She won the position for Kitchissippi Ward councillor in the 2006 Ottawa municipal election on 13 November 2006 after incumbent Shawn Little dropped out of the race. She only served one term however, losing the 2010 election to Katherine Hobbs. After her defeat she went to on to head the Glebe Business Improvement Area (BIA).

Before being elected to city council she was executive director of the Westboro Business Improvement Area for 14 years. She worked on the board of the community paper Newswest for a decade prior to its merger with Kitchissippi Times.

She was opposed to the original O-Train North-South light rail project proposal that would have run from downtown to Barrhaven starting in 2009.
