= Jeff Leiper =

Canadian politician (born 1970)

Ottawa City Councillor
- In office December 1, 2014 – November 15, 2026
- Preceded by: Katherine Hobbs
- Succeeded by: Joanne Chianello
- Constituency: Kitchissippi Ward

Personal details
- Born: March 8, 1970 (age 56) Ottawa
- Spouse: Natalie Hanson
- Education: University of Ottawa; Algonquin College

Jeffrey Leiper (born March 8, 1970) is the current Ottawa city councillor for Kitchissippi Ward. He was first elected in the 2014 Ottawa municipal election, defeating the incumbent Katherine Hobbs.

== Early life and career ==
Leiper was born and raised in Ottawa. He was adopted at the age of three, and grew up in Nepean, Blossom Park and in Orleans. As a youth, Leiper was a member of the youth wing of the Progressive Conservative Party of Canada, though he is now a committed progressive. Then a supporter of free trade, he worked on a local Progressive Conservative Party campaign in the 1988 Canadian federal election.

He studied history and English at the University of Ottawa, and print journalism at Algonquin College. Leiper first ran for office as a 24 year old in the 1994 municipal elections for a seat on Cumberland Township Council. At the time he was still attending the University of Ottawa. He ran on a platform of higher density developments, the completion of a north-south link between then Highway 17 (now Highway 174) and Highway 417 (which was never built), more parks and the completion of a library. Running in Ward 2, covering the southern section of Orleans, he won just 3% of the vote.

In the 1990s, he worked at a tech-centred newspaper called Silicon Valley North, before working in trade newsletters and the Ottawa Business Journal. In around 2007 he started working for the Canadian Radio-Television and Telecommunications Commission, while working for the local community newspaper Newswest.

Leiper has a long background working with the Hintonburg Community Association, where he served as its president. For many years, he created and organized events such as the Cyclelogik Hintonburg 5k Run/Walk and Newswest Kids 1K, Dog Movie Night and the annual Hintonburg Street Hockey Tournament. His community work includes a significant background in planning, traffic, economic development, and other neighbourhood and citywide issues.

== Political career ==
Leiper was first elected to Ottawa City Council in the 2014 Ottawa municipal election, where he defeated incumbent Katherine Hobbs to become city councillor for Kitchissippi Ward.

In 2017, Leiper withdrew support for a plan to install new bike lanes within his ward after residents and business owners indicated their opposition to the proposal.

In 2018, Leiper called for a temporary moratorium on new triplexes within Westboro, citing that they represent "overintensification". This was supported by local residents, who broadly opposed the replacement of single-family homes in their neighbourhood with six-unit dwellings.

Leiper supports the use of supervised injection sites in Ottawa, aligning with the findings of Health Canada. In 2018, in an interview with a national broadcaster, he stated that the saving of lives amidst the opioid crisis should take priority, and would support the opening of additional facilities in Ottawa in "appropriate locations".

Leiper was re-elected in the 2018 Ottawa municipal election with 85% of the vote, the second-largest margin of victory in the elections that year (after Stephen Blais). On February 13, 2019, he suffered a heart attack while shovelling snow. Following his recovery, he announced he had quit smoking and partnered with Ottawa Public Health to encourage others to quit smoking as well.

Leiper has been a frequent critic of the Ottawa Police Service. In the aftermath of the convoy protests in Ottawa, following which he called for a royal commission to investigate the shortcomings in the police response and the rise of political extremism in Canada. Leiper wrote an op-ed in the Ottawa Citizen stating that "I believe absolutely in moving resources from policing," and calling on council to "insist on a 10% budget reduction, and refuse to pass a police budget without it". In 2021, Leiper voted against the police budget, saying "that communities are at a crossroads to define what role police should have in society".

In 2022, Leiper voiced support for free transit arguing that while it was "a high bar to clear to convince homeowners to accept higher taxes for fare-free transit," it was "still less than the $1,500 annual cost of a bus pass".

Leiper was re-elected for a third time in the 2022 Ottawa municipal election. During his third term, his top priorities included affordable housing and improvements to public transit. In 2023, he voted against "Landsdowne 2.0" which would provide over $130 million of municipal subsidies for the redevelopment of Lansdowne Park. The project is expected to cost $418.8 million with the City of Ottawa paying a net cost of $130 million. The Ottawa Charge of the Professional Women's Hockey League have criticized the project and stated they will not play at TD Place Arena, if the arena's capacity is reduced from 8,585 to 5,500, as is planned. The project was approved by a vote of 16 to 9. In June 2024, Leiper proposed delaying the city's plan to remove free parking in Westboro and Wellington Village until O-Train service was available in both neighbourhoods. However, the proposal was defeated at the city's transit committee. Later that year, Leiper led opposition to OC Transpo plans to reduce O-Train frequency as a cost-saving measure. His motion to reverse the O-Train service cuts was defeated narrowly by a vote of 13 to 12. In December 2024, he was one of three councillors to vote against the 2025 city budget proposed by Mayor Mark Sutcliffe (the others were Laine Johnson and Sean Devine), but he voted for the transportation budget. He argued that aggressive cost-cutting measures would cost the city more money in the long-term, but that he "was happy to support a package of fare increases and a higher transit levy". In September 2025, Leiper introduced a motion to rescind the city's return-to-office mandate which called for municipal workers to work in the office all five days a week, stating that it was "a short-sighted decision that serves no one well in either the short or long term," and “ignores the reality that Ottawa's public transit system is already unreliable for too many."

=== Mayoral campaign ===
On June 25, 2025, Leiper announced his intention to run for mayor of Ottawa in the 2026 Ottawa municipal election.

Leiper officially registered to run for mayor on May 1, 2026, the first day candidates could sign up to run. On his first day as an official candidate, he released his partial election platform focusing on reliable transit, the building of 1,500 non-profit homes each year, focusing police resources on alternative models, and extending opening hours at city facilities. He also promised that he would refuse all donations from developers and refuse using the "strong mayor" powers enabled in the Strong Mayors, Building Homes Act.

== Personal life ==
Leiper has lived in Kitchissippi Ward since 1995 when he and his spouse Natalie moved into the Julian Apartments in the Wellington West area. Today, he lives in Hintonburg with Natalie and their son.

Leiper has several tattoos, marking important moments in his life, such as being elected to city council, his heart attack in 2019, the first marathon he ran, and the beginning of his sobriety from alcohol in 2004. He has a large collection of vinyl records, and is a big fan of Bruce Springsteen. He also enjoys photography and is an avid reader.

== Electoral record ==
2022 Ottawa Municipal Election: Kitchissippi Ward	Vote	%
Jeff Leiper (X)	11,055	71.97
Oonagh Fitzgerald	3,247	21.14
Daniel Stringer	1,058	6.89

2018 Ottawa Municipal Election: Kitchissippi Ward	Vote	%
Jeff Leiper (X)	12,068	85.28
Daniel Stringer	2,083	14.72

2014 Ottawa Municipal Election: Kitchissippi Ward	Vote	%
Jeff Leiper	7,557	55.36
Katherine Hobbs (X)	4,197	30.75
Michelle Reimer	1,530	11.21
Ellen Lougheed	272	1.99
Larry Wasslenn	95	0.70

1994 Ottawa-Carleton Regional Municipality Elections: Cumberland Township: Bilberry Ward	Vote	%
Dave Lewis	1,514	73.49
Vic Powell	476	23.11
Jeff Leiper	70	3.40
