= Wellington Village =

- Neighbourhood
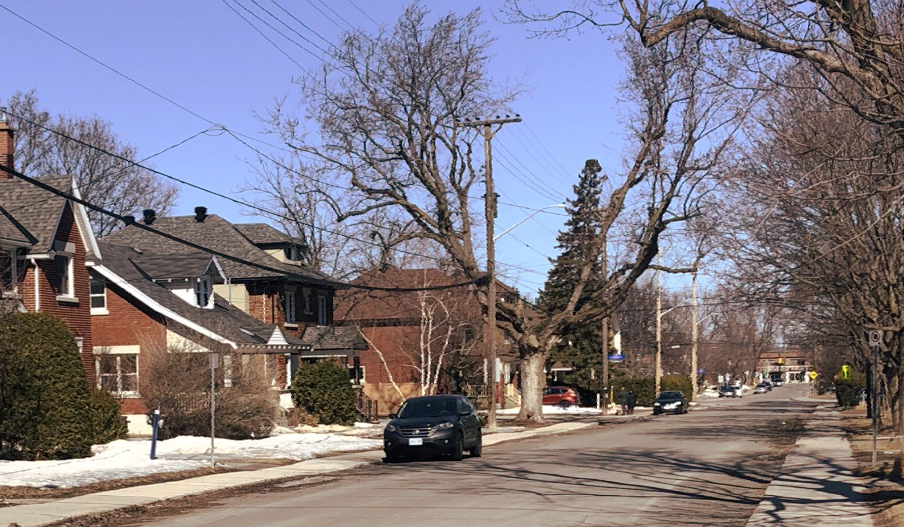
- Clarendon Avenue
- Location of Wellington Village
- Coordinates: 45°23′50″N 75°44′05″W
- Country: Canada
- Province: Ontario
- City: Ottawa
- Established: 1922

Government
  - Mayor: Mark Sutcliffe
  - MPs: Yasir Naqvi
  - MPPs: Catherine McKenney
  - Councillor: Jeff Leiper

Population (2021)
  - Total: 4,324
- Time zone: UTC−5 (EST)
  - Summer (DST): UTC−4 (EDT)

Wellington Village (formerly Island Park) is a neighbourhood in Kitchissippi Ward in the west end of Ottawa, Ontario, Canada. It is bounded on the north by Scott Street, on the west by Island Park Drive, on the south by The Queensway and on the east by Holland Avenue. The neighbourhood is covered by the Wellington Village Community Association, with the exception of Island Park Drive, which is covered by the Island Park Community Association. The neighbourhood was originally named Elmdale for the number of elm trees in the area, and was founded in 1922. The homes were built between the 1920s and 1940s.

The neighbourhood is home to two public schools (Fisher Park and Elmdale), one Catholic School (St. George) and one park (Fisher Park).

The neighbourhood is home to the western half of Wellington Street West BIA, which extends into neighbouring Hintonburg. The area is served on Ottawa's Transitway by Tunney's Pasture Station, which runs along the neighbourhood's northern border, parallel to Scott Street.
