= Newswest =

Canadian publication

Newswest is a community publication serving a number of communities within Canada's National Capital Region. Newswest is a wholly Canadian publication and not related to the 1980s U.S. newspaper NewsWest, previously owned by Tab Communications.

Newswest was founded in October 1978 with help from the Canada Works federal program of the time. Early on, it moved its headquarters into the old Westboro Community Centre on Dovercourt Avenue for 5 years prior to that property's conversion to a recreation centre. When the neighbouring Hintonburg News ceased operation, Newswest expanded its coverage into the now defunct Elmdale Ward in 1998.

Newswest is one of the longest surviving community newspapers in Ottawa. It operates as a non-profit corporation and is published 12 times a year inside Kitchissippi Times with a circulation of well over 16,000 copies. The inclusion of Newswest in Kitchissippi Times began in 2003 after an agreement on advertising revenue was reached between the 2 papers. Since that time Kitchissippi Times handles all advertising allowing Newswest to focus on its non-profit community content. Kitchissippi Times is published 24 times per year so the editors of the 2 papers share responsibility on things like the Community Calendar section.

Newswest covers the area bordered (east to west) by the O-Train Line 2 and Woodroofe Avenue, and between the Ottawa River and Carling Avenue. This area includes the neighbourhoods of Mechanicsville, Hintonburg, Champlain Park, West Wellington, Hampton Park, Westboro Beach, Westboro, Highland Park, McKellar Park, Carlingwood and the Civic Hospital.

Most of the articles to Newswest are provided by local volunteer writers and photographers. Additionally, columns from the local representatives for 3 levels of government and the public school board appear regularly.

The current editor of Newswest is Tim Thibeault.
