= Laurentian View =

Neighbourhood of Ottawa, Canada

Laurentian View is a sub-neighbourhood of Westboro, Ottawa, Ontario, Canada. It is bounded west by Tweedsmuir, north to Richmond Road, east to Hilson and south by Carling Avenue. While the name still appears on maps, it fell out of use to describe the area in the 1970s, as the area is now found completely with in the boundaries of the Hampton-Iona neighbourhood.

The neighbourhood is a mixture of low to high class residences. The townhouses are south of Dovercourt Avenue and north to Carling.

== History ==
The neighbourhood was named after the Laurentian Mountains due to being on a steep hill seeing "the views of the Laurentian Mountains". The view of the Laurentian Mountains was mentioned in a flyer "move to Westboro" in the late 1800s.

Residents of the area adopted the name in 1909, and a post office was established on Hilson Avenue.

== Features ==
There are bike paths along Byron Avenue. The bike paths used to be part of the Ottawa Trolley Line until 1959.

== See also ==
Westboro
