= Hampton Park, Ottawa =

Hampton Park
- Neighbourhood
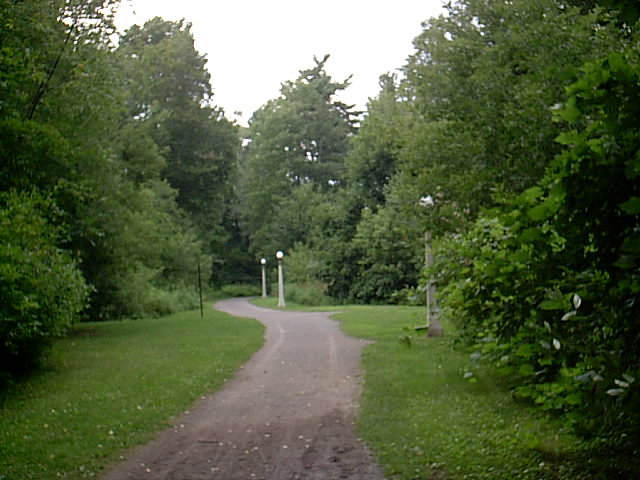
- A recreational path in Hampton Park

- Location within Ottawa
- Coordinates: 45°23′25″N 75°44′22″W
- Country: Canada
- Province: Ontario
- City: Ottawa

Government
  - MPs: Yasir Naqvi
  - MPPs: Catherine McKenney
  - Councillors: Jeff Leiper
  - Governing body: Hampton Iona Community Group
  - President: Lorne Cutler

Area
  - Total: 1.018 km^{2} (0.393 sq mi)
- Elevation: 75 m (246 ft)

Population (Canada 2016 Census)
  - Total: 3,198
  - Density: 3,141/km^{2} (8,136/sq mi)
- Time zone: Eastern (EST)
- Forward sortation area: K1Z
- Website: Hampton Iona Community Group

Hampton Park (French: Parc Hampton) is a park and neighbourhood in Kitchissippi Ward, in the west end of Ottawa, Ontario, Canada. It is directly north of the Queensway at Island Park Drive. The park is maintained by the National Capital Commission.

== Neighbourhood ==
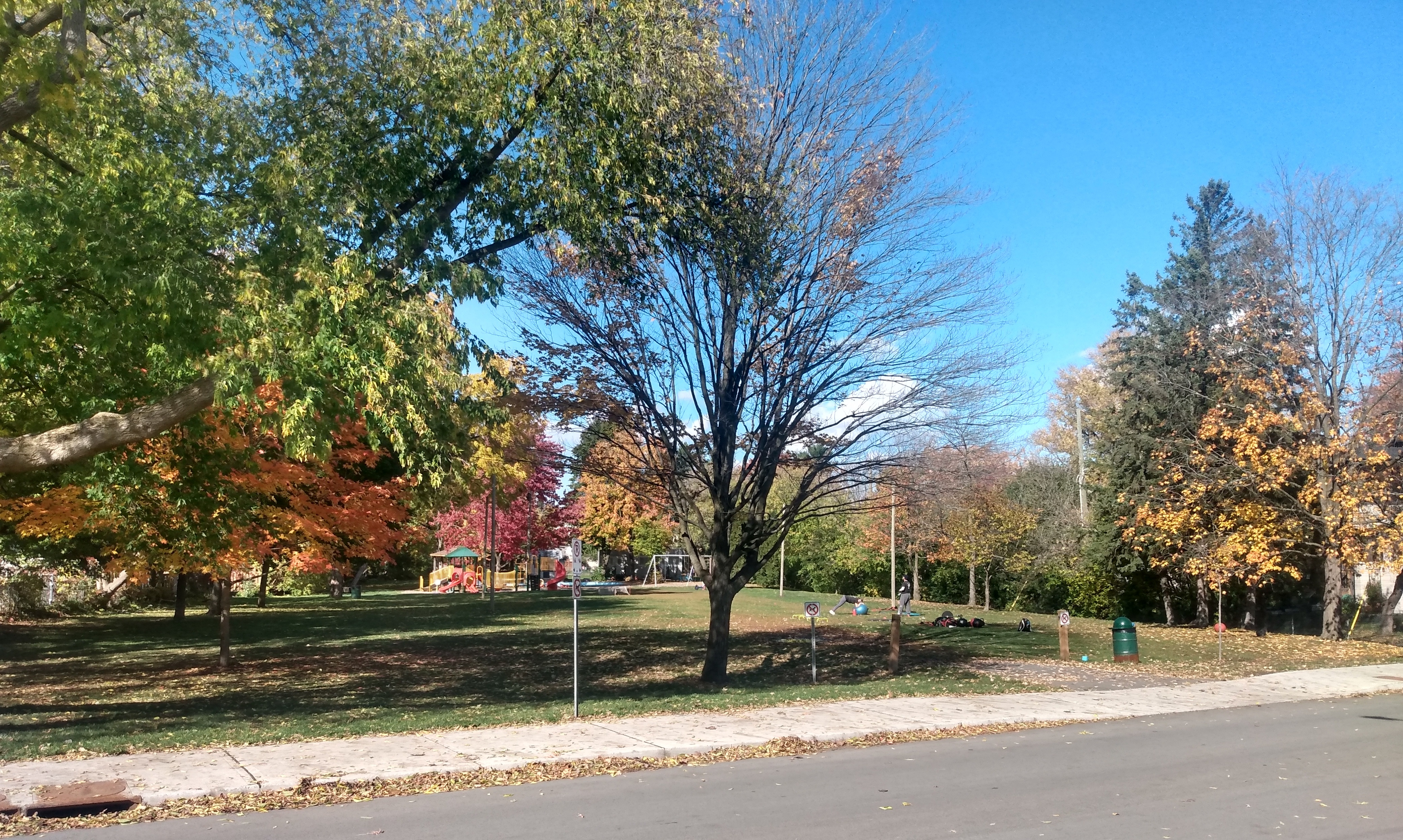
Iona Park is another park in the neighbourhood

The neighbourhood, referred to as Hampton Iona by its community association is sometimes considered a sub-neighbourhood of the Westboro area. The neighbourhood is bounded on the west by Tweedsmuir Avenue, on the east by Island Park Drive on the north by Richmond Road and the south by Carling Avenue. The population of the neighbourhood was 3,198 according to the Canada 2016 Census.

The area was first developed in 1910 by J.C. Brennan who shares his name with Brennan Avenue which is a residential street in the area. Originally, the neighbourhood was named Laurentian View.

Many streets near Hampton Park are named for upper-class neighbourhoods of London, including Kensington, Piccadilly and Mayfair. The name Hampton Park might itself be named after the neighbourhood of Hampton in London.

Census Tract
Year	Pop.	±%
1991	2,950	—
1996	2,951	+0.0%
2001	2,943	−0.3%
2006	2,782	−5.5%
2011	2,852	+2.5%
2016	3,198	+12.1%

== History ==
Hampton Park has a fairly long history in the context of parks in the city of Ottawa. Baseball games were played in the park at least far back as 1916. An Ottawa Citizen article from the time indicates that the park was the location of a Trolley Line Baseball League game between Britannia and Ottawa West.

The park itself has existed in Ottawa's west end for almost 100 years. The area was purchased by the Federal District Commission (now the National Capital Commission) in 1927. The park is several blocks in length and has a flat grassy area with benches as well as a wooded area with paths which is mainly used by people walking their dogs.

== Current Use ==
Hampton Park is owned by the National Capital Commission and maintained by the City of Ottawa (under contract by the NCC). Maintenance includes but is not limited to garbage removal, mowing, tree planting, invasive species removal, upkeep of recreational facilities, and bylaw enforcement.

The Woods of Hampton Park contains a great variety of tree and plant species; some trees have been estimated to be more than 250 years old. The woods are classified as Urban Natural Area 122 and are designated an Environmental Protected Zone (EPZ) to recognize the ecological services they provide. In Hampton Park, these services specifically include storm water and temperature control, and habitat for local and migratory wildlife. Walking dogs off leash, cycling, or building structures (forts, ramps, etc.) is prohibited in an EPZ.

The area of the park just north of the Queensway contains a basketball court, two baseball diamonds, a seasonal outdoor wading pool for young children, a playground, swings, and changing room facilities.

Dogs are only allowed off leash in the fenced in dog run parallel to the Queensway. In all other areas of the park, dogs must be kept on leash.

There is also another park in the neighbourhood called Iona Park.

== Queensway expansion and Hampton Park ==
Hampton Park is notable for being the construction site for the Island Park bridge replacement project that occurred during the summer of 2007.

In recent years there has been mounting pressure from the Ontario provincial government to expand the Queensway and make it more efficient. This led to a proposal by the National Capital Commission to build a new off ramp on the west side of Island Park drive. The proposed off ramp would have cut through part of the wooded area north of the Queensway, and would have linked Island Park Drive with Merivale Road via a roundabout.

After months of pressure from the Island Park community the plan was eventually scrapped.
