= Katherine Hobbs =

Ottawa city councillor

Katherine Hobbs is a former Ottawa city councillor of Kitchissippi Ward. She won the ward in the 2010 Ottawa municipal election, defeating the incumbent Christine Leadman, and was defeated by Jeff Leiper in 2014.

Hobbs lived in the Hintonburg neighbourhood of the city, and was raised in Ottawa. She graduated from the University of Ottawa in Business Administration and received a certification in Internet Marketing from the University of British Columbia. Prior to being elected, she worked for Novotech Technologies from 2003. She has also worked for Bell Canada, Nortel, Aastra Telecom and Scotiabank.

Hobbs is a cycling advocate who sold her car in 2012 in favour of other modes of transportation, including cycling, walking, shared car services and public transit. She was involved in creating more cycling infrastructure in Kitchissippi, most notably Churchill Avenue reconstruction, the first complete street design in Ottawa, incorporating raised segregated pedestrian and cycling lanes.

During her first term on the council, Hobbs secured $500,000 worth of funding for five community design plans. Incorporating community input, these plans provided guidelines for how the ward will develop, protecting low rise residential areas and increasing greenspace in the study areas around transit. Hobbs is a transit advocate who supported extra stations in Kitchissippi for the city-wide LRT project, and on the expansion of the O Train.

Hobbs has prioritized parks. New park projects during Hobbs' term included Evergreen Park, which incorporated the first dog run in the ward, and Ottawa's largest dog park in Hampton Park; and a $1 million upgrade of Fisher Park to provide a splashpad and renewed basketball courts. Two fieldhouses were planned for Reid Park in the Civic Hospital neighbourhood and Westboro Beach.

Hobbs was a member of the Planning Committee, Transit Commission, Confederation Line working group, the Board of Health, Heritage Sub-Committee, Governance Committee, Development Charge Review Sub-Committee, and Film Development Corporation Board. She was a board member on the Westboro BIA and West Wellington BIA.

Hobbs was appointed city co-chair of the 2017 Committee, a group of Ottawa's business community who planned the celebrations for the 150th anniversary of Canada, an initiative to boost Ottawa's economic viability.
