= Parkdale Avenue (Ottawa) =

Street in Ottawa, Canada

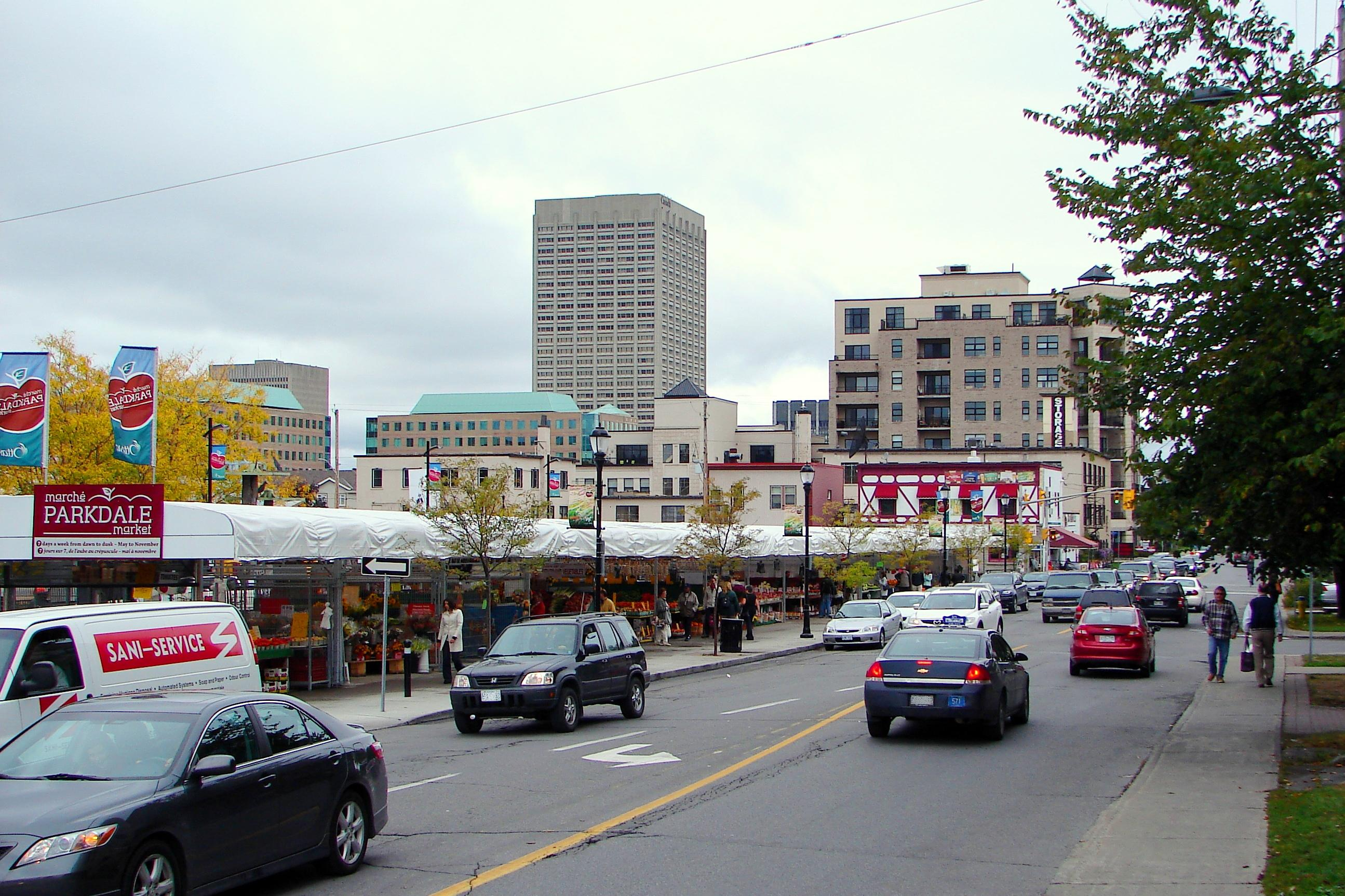
Parkdale Avenue and the Parkdale Market.

Parkdale Avenue is an arterial road located west of downtown Ottawa, Ontario, Canada. It runs in a north-south direction between the Kichi Zibi Mikan and Carling Avenue in the Hintonburg and Civic Hospital neighbourhoods. It is an extremely busy road providing access to Tunney's Pasture, the Parkdale Market, the Ottawa Civic Hospital (1053 Carling Avenue), and the Central Experimental Farm. Furthermore, it has direct connections to other major east-west arteries such as Scott Street, Wellington Street West, Gladstone Avenue, and Highway 417.

Parkdale Avenue is a 2-lane city road which widens briefly to 4 lanes near Highway 417 where it forms a diamond interchange. On-street parking is permitted near Tunney's Pasture and between Carling Avenue and Highway 417. OC Transpo Route 14 runs along Parkdale Avenue from Carling Avenue to Gladstone Avenue where the route turns east, connecting to downtown Ottawa and Elgin Street to the centre-west part of the city.

== Future ==
The southern terminus of the road at Carling Avenue could be extended in the future to access a new Civic Hospital campus located within the Central Experimental Farm.
