= 2010 Ottawa municipal election =

Election in Canada

2010 Ottawa mayoral election
- October 25, 2010
- Turnout: ~44% (▼ ~10pp)
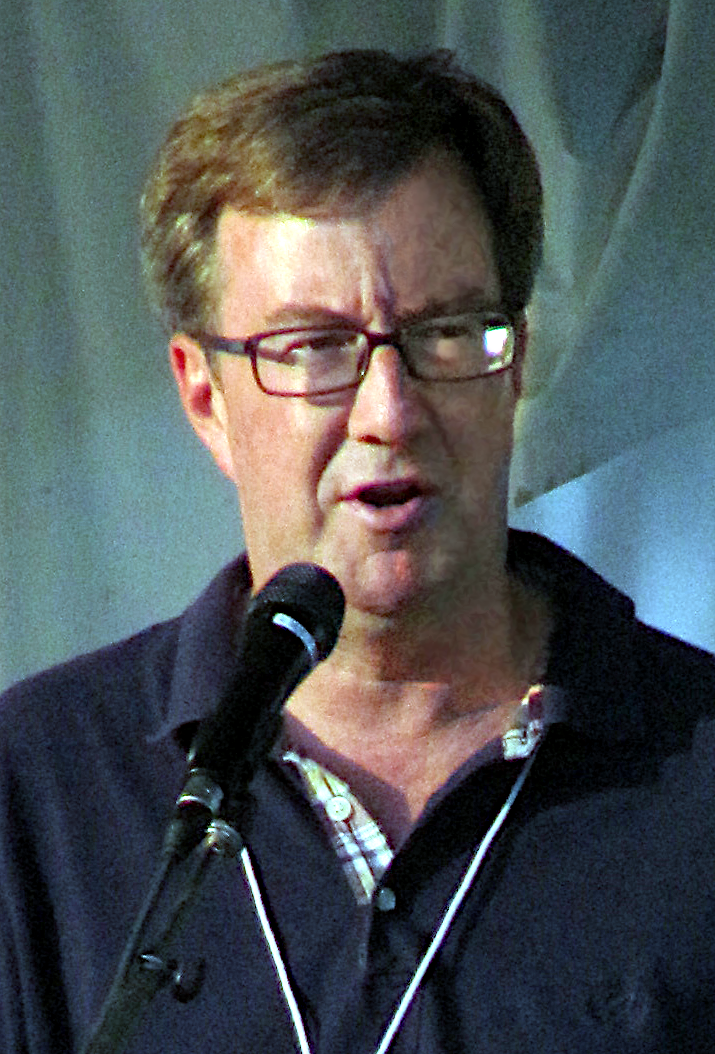

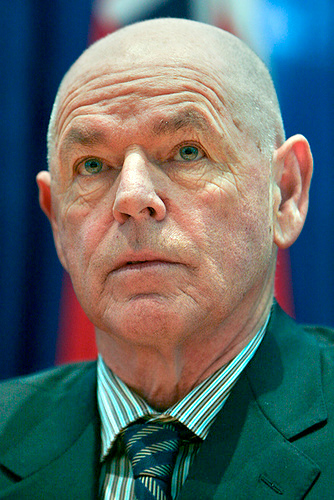

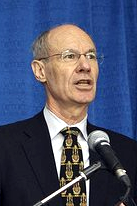
Candidate	Jim Watson	Larry O'Brien	Clive Doucet
Popular vote	131,258	64,853	40,148
Percentage	48.70%	24.06%	14.89%
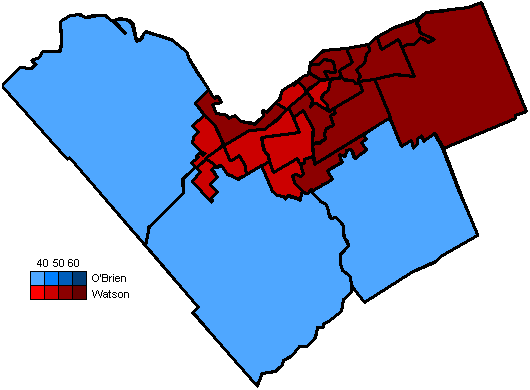
Mayor before election
Larry O'Brien
Elected mayor
Jim Watson

The 2010 Ottawa municipal election was a municipal election that was held on October 25, 2010, to elect the mayor of Ottawa, Ottawa City Council and Boards of Trustees of Ottawa's English public, English Catholic, French public and French Catholic school boards. The election was held on the same date as elections in every other municipality in Ontario.

== Background ==
In Ottawa's 2006 municipal election, newcomer Larry O'Brien defeated former city councillor Alex Munter and then-incumbent Bob Chiarelli in an election largely based on the expansion of Ottawa's light rail transit system. A Léger Marketing poll published by the Ottawa Sun on May 26, 2007 put O'Brien's approval ratings at 24%, and reported that if an election were held that day, he and Munter would have been tied with 35% of the vote of those surveyed.

Terry Kilrea, who had dropped out of the previous mayoral race on August 30, 2006, accused O'Brien of offering him up to $30,000 and a political appointment if Kilrea would withdraw from that race and support O'Brien. On August 5, 2009, Larry O'Brien was acquitted of bribery charges stemming from this accusation.

Alex Munter, the second-place candidate in 2006, did not run in the 2010 election. Bob Chiarelli, mayor from 1997–2006, was elected in a March 2010 by-election to the Legislative Assembly of Ontario, replacing another former mayor, Jim Watson, who left the legislative seat to run in the 2010 mayoral race.

On June 30, O'Brien announced that he would seek another term as mayor.

An Ottawa Citizen poll conducted in June 2010 showed public transit to the most important policy issue among city voters, ahead of taxes and the Lansdowne Park redevelopment.

The race featured the largest number of candidates for mayor and for city council in the history of Ottawa.

Turnout for the election was 44%, down 10% from 2006. The election saw seven incumbents go down to defeat (including the mayor). Except for mayor, the city had not seen an incumbent councillor lose since amalgamation.

Watson won nearly half of the votes. His strongest wards were in the city's East end, despite having never represented the area (except as mayor). His highest vote percentage was in Rideau-Vanier Ward. Watson's worst wards were the three rural wards which were the only three wards he lost. His worst ward was West Carleton-March Ward.

O'Brien received about one quarter of the votes in the city. He won just three wards, in Ottawa's rural areas. The suburbs did not vote for him the way they did in 2006, and his worst areas were again in central Ottawa. Doucet's strongest ward was Capital Ward, the ward he represented on council. He was unable to win it however, losing to Watson who also represented the ward in the 1990s. Doucet's strength was in the central part of the city, and his worst areas were the rural areas. Haydon finished fourth in the race. His strongest areas in the rural parts of the city, and in Nepean, a city of which he was once mayor. He did not perform well in his home ward however, of Gloucester-South Nepean. His worst areas were in the central part of the city.

== Candidates ==
=== Cesar Bello ===
Bello, 46, was a businessperson who has lived in Ottawa for 20 years. He holds a Ph.D. in Social Anthropology. He was the organizing chair of the Green Party of Canada. He was the owner and director of Mundo en Espanol', a Spanish language newspaper in the Ottawa-Gatineau area.

- Endorsements:
- Date of announcement: April 16, 2010
- Date registered: April 16, 2010
- Date campaign launched: N/A
- Website: www.cesarbello.ca

=== Idris Ben-Tahir ===
Ben-Tahir, 71 was born in India. He moved to Canada in 1960, and is an information scientist. He once worked for the public service. He lives in Somerset Ward. In 2006, he ran for the Conservative Party of Canada nomination in Ottawa Centre, but lost. He ran for city council in 2006 in Somerset Ward that year and lost.

- Date registered: September 10, 2010
- Date campaign launched: N/A

=== Clive Doucet ===
Doucet, 64, was the city councillor for Capital Ward. He represented Capital Ward on the Ottawa-Carleton Regional Council from 1997 to 2000 and on Ottawa City Council since 2000. Along with Bob Chiarelli, he spearheaded the development of Ottawa's O-Train. Doucet graduated from the University of Toronto, receiving a B.A. in Urban Anthropology. He received a master's degree in the same field from the Université de Montréal. Before being elected, he served as a public servant both on a provincial and federal level. He has lived in Ottawa since 1972, and is also an accomplished writer. Doucet has, in the past, been associated with progressive initiatives at the municipal level and has worked across party lines with other levels of government to further regional interests. He was endorsed by the New Democratic Party while running for City Council.

- Endorsements: Xtra Ottawa, Canadian Institute for Business and the Environment, The Safari Post, Mike Cassidy, former Ontario NDP leader, Ed Broadbent, former NDP leader, Mike Bryan, former Goulbourn Township Councillor
- Date of announcement: July 6, 2010
- Date registered: July 6, 2010
- Website: www.clivedoucet.com

=== Joseph Furtenbacher ===
Furtenbacher, 50, was a polymathic macroethicist. He used to be a band player and is now on provincial disability, because, as he puts it, he is 'unethically challenged'.

- Date registered: N/A
- Website: http://josephfurtenbacher.wordpress.com

=== Robert G. Gauthier ===
Gauthier, 73, publishes a small local newspaper and is in construction. He is a perennial candidate for office. He ran for mayor in 1997, coming in second with 12.1% of the vote. He ran as an independent in the 2003 provincial election in Ottawa West—Nepean, receiving 0.4% of the vote. He also ran as an independent in the 2004 federal election in Ottawa Centre, receiving 0.2% of the vote. Although he indicated his intention to withdraw, Gauthier remained on the official list of nominees.

- Date registered: N/A

=== Andrew S. Haydon ===
Haydon, 77, was a Regional Chair for the Ottawa-Carleton Regional Council from 1978 to 1991 and former mayor for the City of Nepean. He was candidate for Gloucester-South Nepean Ward in the 2006 election against Steve Desroches. He was also an advisor for incumbent Mayor Larry O'Brien. Hayden announced his candidacy on September 10, 2010 on the final day of registration for candidates for the election. Hayden who was one of the main actors in the creation of the Ottawa Transitway system, announced his plans for an expanded rapid-transit system without light rail but with a downtown tunnel. He also planned to reform OC Transpo management by having a group of elected representatives taking control of the transit commission. He is regarded as a fiscal conservative, and has often criticized the spending by the current administration.

- Endorsements: Gord Hunter, city councillor
- Date of announcement: September 10, 2010
- Date registered: September 10, 2010
- Website: https://web.archive.org/web/20120308213731/http://www.andyhaydon.com/

=== Robert Larter ===
Larter, 65 ran in the previous election, and received 0.2% of the vote. He was an unknown candidate who never returned phone calls, didn't show up to all-candidate debates, and the press was unable to find out who he was. There was some news when he reportedly used strong, sometimes racist language whilst emailing other candidates during the election. Larter ran in the Canadian federal election, 2008 in the riding of Ottawa—Vanier as an independent. He received 226 votes, or 0.44% (5th of 7 candidates). Larter dropped out of the mayor race on March 2, but re-entered the race in June. In the meantime, he registered and withdrew himself from running as city councillor in 10 different wards.

- Date registered: N/A

=== Robin Lawrance ===
Lawrance, 53, was a visually impaired transit activist and former soldier. He ran as an independent candidate in the 1989 Quebec provincial election and later ran for mayor of Cowansville, Quebec. Lawrance was once a supporter of Larry O'Brien. He was born in Scotland, and he emigrated to Canada in 1962. He served in the Canadian Armed Forces. On Friday 23 October 2010, three days before the election, Lawrance was charged with assault with a weapon and assault causing bodily harm.

- Date registered: June, 2010

=== Vincent M. Libweshya ===
Libweshya, 25, was born in Nairobi, Kenya, and claims to be a distant relative of Barack Obama. He is a musician, entrepreneur and business owner. He had supported Jim Watson, but decided to run on his own.

- Date registered: August 5, 2010
- Date of campaign launch: August 8, 2010 https://ottawacitizen.com/news/running/3370283/story.html
- Website:

=== Fraser Liscumb ===
Liscumb, 62, was the CEO/President of Innovation Hub.

- Date registered: September 10, 2010
- Date campaign launched: N/A
- Website: Website

=== Daniel Joseph Lyrette ===
Lyrette, age unknown, was a licensed optician. He has been with the College of Opticians of Ontario for 42 years.

- Date registered: September 10
- Date campaign launched: N/A

=== Mike Maguire ===
Mike Maguire, 49, was born in Montreal, and has been living in Kars since 1966. He is a graduate of Algonquin College. In 1990 he ran for School Board Trustee. In 2003, he won the Canadian Alliance nomination for the 2004 federal election in Nepean—Carleton, but the party merged with the Progressive Conservatives, nullifying it. He is an independent management consultant and is a former public servant. He worked on both the Terry Kilrea and Larry O'Brien campaigns in the last election.

- Date of announcement: February 5, 2010
- Date registered: February 5, 2010
- Date campaign launched: August 24, 2010
- Website: mikeformayor.ca

=== Larry O'Brien ===
O'Brien, age 61, had been the mayor since 2006. O'Brien is a graduate of Algonquin College. A businessman by trade, he only entered politics in 2006. He is the former CEO of Calian Technologies Ltd. He lives in the ByWard Market on Rideau Street and describes himself as a conservative.

- Endorsements: Senator Art Eggleton, MPP Norm Sterling, MPP Lisa MacLeod, MP Royal Galipeau, former MP Monte Solberg, Elizabeth Manley, Chris Phillips, Jeff Hunt, former councillor Brian McGarry, former MP Barry Turner
- Date of announcement: June 30, 2010
- Date registered: July 6, 2010
- Date campaign launched: September 8, 2010
- Website: larryobrien.net

=== Julio Pita ===
- Date registered: September 10, 2010
- Date campaign launched: N/A

=== Sean Ryan ===
Ryan, 27, moved from Sault Ste. Marie, Ontario to Ottawa in 2005. He worked at a local software company.

- Date of announcement: January 18, 2010
- Date registered: January 18, 2010
- Date campaign launched: N/A
- Website: SeanRyanMayor.com

=== Michael St. Arnaud ===
St. Arnaud, 62, was a volunteer at a soup kitchen and church.

- Date registered: N/A
- Date campaign launched: N/A

=== Jane Scharf ===
Scharf, 57, is a longtime political activist in Ottawa who has fought against the Safe Streets Act and other government legislation which she sees as being anti-homeless. She organized a tent city at City Hall and was one of the initial organizers of the Ottawa Panhandlers Union. Scharf ran for mayor in 2006, finishing fourth with 0.5% of the total vote. She is a paralegal.

- Date of announcement: January 20, 2010
- Date registered: January 20, 2010
- Date campaign launched: N/A
- Website: JaneScharf.com

=== Charlie Taylor ===
Taylor, 33 is a journalism student at Carleton University. He was raised in Westboro and lives in Old Ottawa South. He attended Lisgar Collegiate Institute and Algonquin College and has claimed to have had "about 50 jobs" over 11 years in 45 different countries. In the summer time, he drives a truck for the sound and light show on Parliament Hill. Taylor is a member of the Green Party.

- Date of announcement: February 18, 2010
- Date registered: February 18, 2010
- Date campaign launched: September 9, 2010
- Website: www.charlietaylor.ca

=== Jim Watson ===
Watson, 48, had been mayor of Ottawa (1997–2000). He was first elected to provincial office in 2003, and he served in the provincial Cabinet as Liberal Minister of Consumer and Business Services (2003–2005), Minister of Health and Promotion (2005–2007), and Minister of Municipal Affairs and Housing (2007–2010). Prior to being mayor, Watson served on Ottawa City Council from 1991 to 1997, representing Capital Ward. Prior to serving on city council, he was in the public service. His first post as Mayor was cut short due to amalgamation. Between 2000 and 2003 he was a journalist. Watson has been a longtime supporter of the Liberal party. In 1996, he supported Dalton McGuinty's bid to lead the Ontario Liberals. Watson lives in the Wood Park neighbourhood. While he was a city councillor, he lived in Old Ottawa South.

- Endorsements: David Pratt, former MP and federal cabinet minister; former regional councillor Frank Reid. Jim Durrell, mayor of Ottawa from 1985–1991, Janet Stavinga, former mayor of Goulbourn Township and city councillor from Goulbourn Ward, Mary Pitt, former mayor of Nepean, Guy Cousineau, former mayor of Vanier, Penny Collenette, 2008 Ottawa Centre federal Liberal candidate and local lawyer, Ed Mahfouz, 2008 federal Liberal candidate for Nepean-Carleton, Richard Patten, former Ottawa Centre MPP., and Coun. Christine Leadman, Coun. Peter Hume, the Ottawa Citizen, the Ottawa Sun and Le Droit, Ottawa's French-language daily newspaper.
- Date of announcement: January 12, 2010
- Date registered: February 1, 2010
- Date campaign launched: April 18, 2010. Launched again on September 8.
- Website: jimwatson.ca

=== Samuel Wright ===
Wright, 25 was a resident of Ottawa's Byward Market. He grew up in Westboro and attended Notre Dame High School. He was quoted in the August 7, 2010 edition of the Ottawa Citizen as saying "I'm a young 25-year-old who loves outdoor activities and cottages"

- Date of announcement: March 11, 2010
- Date registered: March 11, 2010

== Withdrawn ==
=== Alex Cullen ===
Cullen, 58, has sat on Ottawa City Council since 2001, representing Bay Ward in Ottawa's west end. He also sat on Ottawa City Council from 1991 to 1994 representing Richmond Ward. After working as a policy analyst with the federal government, he was elected to serve as a public school trustee in 1982. After serving on city council from 1991 to 1994, he was elected exclusively to the Ottawa-Carleton Regional Council from 1994 to 1997 when he was elected to become the Liberal Member of Provincial Parliament for Ottawa West. He served until losing re-election in 1999. While in office, he crossed the floor to join the Ontario NDP. Between 1999 and 2001 he served as an executive director of the Council on Aging, a United Way agency and lobby group for seniors. Cullen dropped out on August 31, 2010, citing low funds. Instead, he ran for re-election in Bay Ward, where he lost.

- Date of announcement: April 2, 2009
- Date registered: January 4, 2010
- Dropped out: August 31, 2010
- Website: electalexcullen.ca

=== Stan Pioro ===
Pioro, 58, is a resident of Richmond. He was born in Ottawa and is a graduate of DeVry Institute of Technology. He has worked 30 years in Ottawa's high tech industry. He is a small business owner who sells items to the Canadian Forces. Pioro is a Conservative.

- Date registered: January 28, 2010
- Date withdrawn: September 10, 2010

=== Eric Romolock ===
Romolock, 21, is a native of Ottawa and would have been the youngest candidate. At the time, he was a political science student at the University of Ottawa.

- Date registered: June 23, 2010
- Date withdrawn: September 10, 2010

=== Gordon Skinner ===
- Date registered: January 12, 2010
- Date withdrawn: January 19, 2010

=== Robert White ===
- Date registered: February 11, 2010
- Date withdrawn: March 9, 2010

== Mayoral results ==
2010 Ottawa municipal election: Mayor of Ottawa
Candidate	Votes	%
Jim Watson	131,323	48.70
(x)Larry O'Brien	64,862	24.06
Clive Doucet	40,148	14.89
Andrew Haydon	18,914	7.01
Mike Maguire	6,618	2.45
Robert G. Gauthier	1,414	0.52
Jane Scharf	1,170	0.43
Charlie Taylor	1,125	0.42
Cesar Bello	928	0.34
Idris Ben-Tahir	730	0.27
Samuel Wright	371	0.14
Sean Ryan	361	0.13
Joseph Furtenbacher	300	0.11
Robin Lawrance	300	0.11
Julio Pita	265	0.10
Robert Larter	219	0.08
Michael St. Arnaud	200	0.07
Daniel J. Lyrette	166	0.06
Vincent Libweshya	122	0.05
Fraser Liscumb	104	0.04
Total valid votes	269,640	100

Source: Official Results, City of Ottawa.

=== Results by ward ===
Ward	Bello	Ben-Tahir	Doucet	Furtenbacher	Gauthier	Haydon	Larter	Lawrance	Libweshya	Liscumb
Orléans	51	27	1918	14	132	939	18	27	6	6
Innes	41	11	1466	11	105	638	10	7	7	5
Barrhaven	36	32	1267	6	26	1305	10	15	4	3
Kanata North	23	23	1222	14	14	704	12	9	3	2
West Carleton- March	6	5	958	2	10	909	3	8	2	1
Stittsville	9	7	771	1	9	664	2	8	2	1
Bay	37	68	2009	20	38	1226	20	21	8	8
College	40	32	2112	13	22	1632	7	15	6	10
Knoxdale- Merivale	33	47	1583	17	17	1281	11	12	4	3
Gloucester- Southgate	84	62	1378	25	39	726	15	20	12	8
Beacon Hill-Cyrville	70	24	1297	7	143	592	7	10	1	6
Rideau-Vanier	66	24	2148	15	261	423	11	14	11	4
Rideau- Rockcliffe	68	48	1975	15	179	481	11	19	8	6
Somerset	47	33	2455	17	45	326	15	18	12	1
Kitchissippi	39	21	3556	12	21	603	10	10	3	6
River	52	57	1917	16	31	798	11	13	6	4
Capital	40	20	4430	18	34	369	8	7	7	5
Alta Vista	58	89	2114	12	74	801	8	15	5	2
Cumberland	39	32	1282	12	135	634	8	8	5	5
Osgoode	15	2	769	8	22	768	5	11	1	4
Rideau- Goulbourn	7	4	898	11	15	1010	1	7	1	4
Gloucester- South Nepean	36	35	976	9	23	721	10	6	5	5
Kanata South	29	26	1646	24	18	1354	6	20	3	5
Ward	Lyrette	Maguire	O'Brien	Pita	Ryan	St. Arnaud	Scharf	Taylor	Watson	Wright
Orléans	14	332	3937	8	27	17	84	52	8685	14
Innes	5	229	2952	9	26	11	44	35	6746	11
Barrhaven	3	394	3335	14	20	4	46	46	5943	19
Kanata North	3	209	2612	10	8	3	35	44	4516	15
West Carleton- March	1	297	3072	2	13	3	28	28	2746	88
Stittsville	2	265	2884	10	7	6	33	15	3195	8
Bay	9	299	3221	8	16	9	82	96	7220	19
College	4	378	4249	14	28	8	68	83	7668	21
Knoxdale- Merivale	8	301	3269	14	20	1	43	47	5540	18
Gloucester- Southgate	7	288	3006	16	24	17	46	39	6107	13
Beacon Hill-Cyrville	9	239	2329	20	11	15	59	39	5484	7
Rideau-Vanier	17	129	1503	10	11	17	58	58	5784	21
Rideau- Rockcliffe	18	139	1729	16	13	17	55	42	5850	27
Somerset	8	126	1393	12	16	12	59	80	5164	21
Kitchissippi	6	211	2389	13	10	9	56	80	7034	22
River	9	312	2875	20	13	8	53	69	6539	27
Capital	5	140	1436	12	6	10	35	52	6543	14
Alta Vista	9	265	2672	13	15	8	52	60	6666	22
Cumberland	11	296	3203	6	25	7	53	40	6371	12
Osgoode	6	441	3039	6	9	1	48	27	2844	11
Rideau- Goulbourn	2	649	3556	6	10	3	36	19	3359	8
Gloucester- South Nepean	8	247	2372	12	13	4	33	36	4759	11
Kanata South	2	431	3793	14	19	10	63	38	6495	22

== Candidates who declined to run ==
- Peggy Feltmate- city councillor.
- Peter Hume - city councillor
- Gord Hunter- city councillor.
- Jacques Legendre- city councillor.

== Polls ==
Date	Firm	Alex Cullen*	Clive Doucet	Andy Haydon	Larry O'Brien	Jim Watson	Source
May 14–21	Leger Marketing	16	-	-	31	53	
June 22–24	Ipsos-Reid	11	-	-	23	41	
July 2–4	Harris-Decima	10	-	-	22	29	
Aug 17-20	Leger Marketing	5	6	-	22	31	
Sept 28-Oct. 1	Holinshed Research Group	-	6	8	17	36	
Oct. 13-14	Ipsos-Reid	-	9	11	20	48	
Oct. 13-17	Leger Marketing	-	12	6	15	43	

* Dropped out

== City Council ==
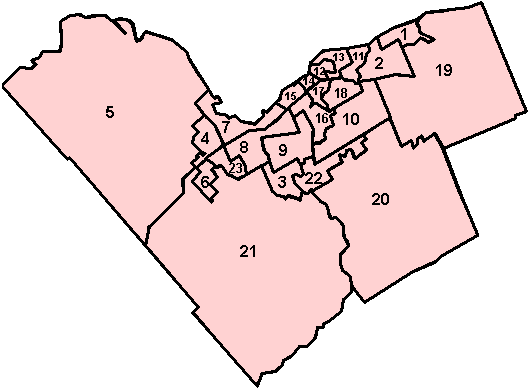
Map of Ottawa's Wards.: 1. Orléans Ward; 2. Innes Ward; 3. Barrhaven Ward; 4. Kanata North Ward; 5. West Carleton-March Ward; 6. Stittsville Ward; 7. Bay Ward; 8. College Ward; 9. Knoxdale-Merivale Ward; 10. Gloucester-Southgate Ward; 11. Beacon Hill-Cyrville Ward; 12. Rideau-Vanier Ward; 13. Rideau-Rockcliffe Ward; 14. Somerset Ward; 15. Kitchissippi Ward; 16. River Ward; 17. Capital Ward; 18. Alta Vista Ward; 19. Cumberland Ward; 20. Osgoode Ward; 21. Rideau-Goulbourn Ward; 22. Gloucester-South Nepean Ward; 23. Kanata South Ward.

=== Orléans Ward ===
Candidates

- Renée Greenberg, west end resident
- Bob Monette, incumbent
- Jennifer Robitaille, purchasing officer with Lanark County
- Fred Sherwin, owner & publisher of OrléansOnline.ca

Candidate	Votes	%
Bob Monette (X)	9,728	59.99
Fred Sherwin	3,939	24.35
Jennifer Robitaille	2,326	14.34
Renee Greenberg	212	1.31

=== Innes Ward ===
Candidates

- Rainer Bloess, incumbent
- Christopher Fraser, public servant and union organizer
- Roger Furmanczyk, retired public servant/financial analyst
- Keith Jansa, occupational health and safety manager at the Canadian Electricity Association and Fallingbrook resident.

Candidate	Vote	%
Rainer Bloess (X)	8,497	69.90
Keith Jansa	1,515	12.46
Christopher Fraser	1,410	11.60
Roger Furmanczyk	734	6.04

=== Barrhaven Ward ===
Candidates

- Jan Harder, incumbent
- Rustin Hollywood, city hall employee with a master's degree in public administration
- Joe King, ran in this ward in 2006

Candidate	Vote	%
Jan Harder (X)	8,263	66.31
Rustin Hollywood	2,944	23.62
Joseph King	1,255	10.07

=== Kanata North Ward ===
Candidates

- Hertnz Golmann
- Jeff Seeton, recruiting-agency owner
- Hal Watson, Military retiree
- Lili Weemen, Centretown resident, perennial candidate including for the NDP in the 1993 Canadian federal election in Mississauga—Lakeshore.
- Marianne Wilkinson, incumbent

Candidate	Vote	%
Marianne Wilkinson (X)	4,742	50.18
Jeff Seeton	4,274	45.23
Lili Weemen	169	1.79
Hal Watson	146	1.54
Herntz Golmann	119	1.26

=== West Carleton-March Ward ===
Candidates

- Alex Aronec, Carleton University student
- Eli El-Chantiry, incumbent
- James Parsons, landscape business owner and Lavergne Bay resident

Candidate	Vote	%
Eli El-Chantiry (X)	6,239	77.40
James Parsons	1,200	14.89
Alexander Aronec	622	7.72

=== Stittsville Ward ===
Incumbent Shad Qadri had announced his intention and filed his papers for re-election. Richard Eveleigh, an unemployed Downtown Ottawa resident was his only challenger.

Candidate	Vote	%
Shad Qadri (X)	7,185	91.46
Richard Eveleigh	671	8.54

=== Bay Ward ===
Candidates

- Alex Cullen, incumbent
- Georges Guirguis, engineer
- Peter Heyck, history student
- Oni Joseph, community activist
- Terry Kilrea, ran in this ward in 2006
- Shawn Little, former Kitchissippi Ward councillor
- Erik Olesen, student
- Mark Taylor, former political aide to Jim Watson and manager of alumni relations at Algonquin College

Ike Awgu, Greg Ross and G.J. Hagenaars dropped out when Cullen announced he was running for re-election, after dropping out of the mayor's race.

Candidate	Vote	%
Mark Taylor	5,394	37.78
Alex Cullen (X)	4,323	30.28
Georges Guirguis	1,789	12.53
Terry Kilrea	1,164	8.15
Shawn Little	903	6.32
Oni Joseph	544	3.81
Peter Heyck	99	0.69
Erik Olesen	61	0.43

=== College Ward ===
Candidates

- Ralph Anderson, computer programmer. Ran for the National Party of Canada in the 1993 Canadian federal election in Nepean
- John Campbell, home inspector
- Rick Chiarelli, incumbent
- Catherine Gardner, community advocate and freelance photographer. Chairman of the city's advisory committee on accessibility
- Lynn Hamilton, social worker and public servant. Ran for the NDP in the 2007 Ontario provincial election in Ottawa West—Nepean
- Craig MacAulay, retired teacher
- William McKinnon, worked for Ottawa ACORN
- Julia Ringma, lawyer

Candidate	Vote	%
Rick Chiarelli (X)	10,531	65.54
Lynn Hamilton	2,367	14.73
Julia Ringma	1,139	7.09
Catherine Gardner	606	3.77
Ralph Anderson	513	3.19
John Campbell	423	2.63
William McKinnon	249	1.55
Craig MacAulay	239	1.49

=== Knoxdale-Merivale Ward ===
Incumbent Gord Hunter did not run for re-election.

Candidates

- James Dean, high-tech worker. Ran unsuccessfully in 2006
- Keith Egli, Lawyer and labour relations specialist
- Fred Ennis, former radio and print newsman
- Syed Asghar Hussain
- Mike Kennedy
- Paul Obeda
- James O'Grady, Liberal-turned-Green Party volunteer
- Jules Ruhinda, new Ottawa resident
- Al Speyers, ran unsuccessfully in 2000 and 2003
- Rod Vanier, Liberal candidate in the 2003 Ontario general election in Nepean—Carleton

Candidate	Votes	%
Keith Egli	3954	32.70
James O'Grady	2335	19.31
Rod Vanier	2115	17.49
James Dean	1907	15.77
Al Speyers	579	4.79
Paul Obeda	485	4.01
Mike Kennedy	268	2.22
Jules Ruhinda	213	1.76
Fred Ennis	121	1.00
Syed Asghar Hussain	116	0.96

=== Gloucester-Southgate Ward ===
Candidates

- Diane Deans, incumbent
- Lilly Obina, worked for Bluedrop Performance Learning Inc.
- Leslie Saintilma, licensed truck driver
- Wade Wallace, Canada Post letter-carrier

Candidate	Vote	%
Diane Deans (X)	5,774	48.48
Lilly Obina	3,864	32.44
Wade Wallace	1,938	16.27
Leslie Saintilma	334	2.80

=== Beacon Hill-Cyrville Ward ===
Candidates

- Michel Bellemare, incumbent
- O'Neil Brooke, "computer geek"
- Tim Tierney, Beacon Hill North Community Association president

Candidate	Vote	%
Tim Tierney	5,088	49.34
Michel Bellemare (X)	4,907	47.58
O'Neil Brooke	318	3.08

=== Rideau-Vanier Ward ===
Candidates

- Georges Bédard, incumbent
- Mathieu Fleury, worked for city's recreation department
- Marc Imbeault, public servant
- Andrew Nellis, spokesman for the Ottawa Panhandlers Union
- Sriyan Pinnawala, lawyer

Candidate	Vote	%
Mathieu Fleury	4,708	45.69
Georges Bédard (X)	4,620	44.84
Andrew Nellis	462	4.48
Sriyan Pinnawala	299	2.90
Marc Imbeault	215	2.09

=== Rideau-Rockcliffe Ward ===
Incumbent Jacques Legendre did not run for re-election

Candidates

- Corry Burke, information technology consultant and actor
- Richard Cannings, former city councillor
- Peter Clark, former regional chairman
- Harley Collison, IT consultant
- Rawlson King, communications expert
- Maurice Lamirande, ran in this ward in 2006.
- Pierre Maheu, French language school trustee
- James Parker, Loblaws worker. Ran in this ward in 2003 and 2006.
- Sheila Perry, endorsed by Our Ottawa, a coalition of community volunteers.
- Bruce Poulin, former military officer. Has a master's degree in negotiation and mediation.

Candidate	Vote	%
Peter D. Clark	2,722	25.84
Maurice Lamirande	1,835	17.42
Sheila Perry	1,709	16.22
Bruce Poulin	1,695	16.09
Richard Cannings	1,333	12.65
Corry Burke	438	4.16
Rawlson King	380	3.61
Pierre Maheu	224	2.13
Harley Collison	129	1.22
James Parker	69	0.66

=== Somerset Ward ===
Candidates

- Don Fex, theatre director, bookstore manager, arts advocate
- Diane Holmes, incumbent
- Susan Miller, Shopper's Drug Mart employee. Immigrant from El Salvador
- Barkley Pollock, former drop-in centre cook

Candidate	Vote	%
Diane Holmes (X)	6,282	66.51
Don Fex	2,024	21.43
Susan Miller	810	8.58
Barkley Pollock	329	3.48

=== Kitchissippi Ward ===
Candidates

- Katherine Hobbs, high tech manager and "crime-writing aficionado"
- Christine Leadman, incumbent
- Daniel Stringer, communications consultant

Candidate	Vote	%
Katherine Hobbs	6,116	44.18
Christine Leadman (X)	5,540	40.02
Daniel Stringer	2,186	15.79

=== River Ward ===
Candidates

- Ian Boyd, music merchant, owner of Glebe Compact Music
- Michael Kostiuk, teacher and geographer
- Maria McRae, incumbent
- Nadia Willard, anti-poverty activist and former nurse

Candidate	Vote	%
Maria McRae (X)	7,496	59.55
Ian Boyd	1,908	15.16
Nadia Willard	1,704	13.54
Michael Kostiuk	1,480	11.76

=== Capital Ward ===
Incumbent Clive Doucet ran for mayor instead of the ward.

Candidates

- Bob Brocklebank, former Glebe Community Association president
- David Chernushenko, former federal and provincial Green Party candidate
- Mano Hadavand
- Eugene Haslam, owner of Zaphod Beeblebrox
- Ron Le Blanc, public service union executive
- Isabel Metcalfe, chair of The Famous Five Committee, trustee on the boards of the Ontario Trillium Foundation and Ottawa Hospital.
- Domenic Santaguida, owner of the Vittoria Trattoria restaurants

Candidate	Vote	%
David Chernushenko	5335	41.34
Isabel Metcalfe	2515	19.49
Bob Brocklebank	2207	17.10
Domenic Santaguida	1475	11.43
Eugene Haslam	1084	8.40
Ron Le Blanc	243	1.88
Mano Hadavand	46	0.36

=== Alta Vista Ward ===
Candidates

- Clinton Cowan, labour relations professional
- Kevin Hogan, carpenter
- Peter Hume, incumbent
- Ernie Lauzon, health and safety consultant

Candidate	Vote	%
Peter Hume (X)	7,553	59.49
Clinton Cowan	2,374	18.70
Ernie Lauzon	1,851	14.58
Kevin Hogan	919	7.24

=== Cumberland Ward ===
Candidates

- Stephen Blais, catholic school trustee
- Rob Jellett, incumbent councillor
- Patrick Paquette, University of Ottawa graduate

Candidate	Vote	%
Stephen Blais	6,358	52.36
Rob Jellett (X)	5,282	43.49
Patrick Paquette	504	4.15

=== Osgoode Ward ===
Candidates

- Bob Masaro, substitute teacher
- Mark Scharfe, cattle farmer and former policeman
- Doug Thompson, incumbent

Candidate	Vote	%
Doug Thompson (X)	5,393	67.26
Mark Scharfe	1,873	23.36
Bob Masaro	752	9.38

=== Rideau-Goulbourn Ward ===
Candidates

- Glenn Brooks, incumbent
- Bruce Chrustie
- Iain McCallum, ran in this ward in 2006
- Scott Moffatt, ran in this ward in 2006
- Bruce Webster, President of the Richmond village association

Candidate	Vote	%
Scott Moffatt	5,048	52.64
Glenn Brooks (X)	2,539	26.48
Bruce Webster	1,181	12.32
J. Iain McCallum	563	5.87
Bruce Chrustie	258	2.69

=== Gloucester-South Nepean Ward ===
Candidates

- Steve Desroches, incumbent
- Stephen Knight, school bus driver

Candidate	Vote	%
Steve Desroches (X)	7,723	84.40
Stephen Knight	1,427	15.60

=== Kanata South Ward ===
Incumbent Peggy Feltmate did not run for re-election.

Candidates

- Marc Favreau, manager at the Canadian Food Inspection Agency
- Aaron Helleman, engineer for a high tech firm, and owner of an online carpooling business. Endorsed by Feltmate.
- Allan Hubley, federal government manager, long-time community volunteer. Former president of the Glen Cairn Community Association. Ran in this ward in 2006.
- Perry Simpson, government consultant
- Michel Tardif
- Rodney Tellez, worked in financial management

Candidate	Vote	%
Allan Hubley	6,783	48.80
Aaron Helleman	5,054	36.36
Marc Favreau	1,633	11.75
Roodney Tellez	196	1.41
Perry Simpson	126	0.91
Michel Tardif	109	0.78

== School Board Trustee ==
=== Ottawa Catholic School Board ===
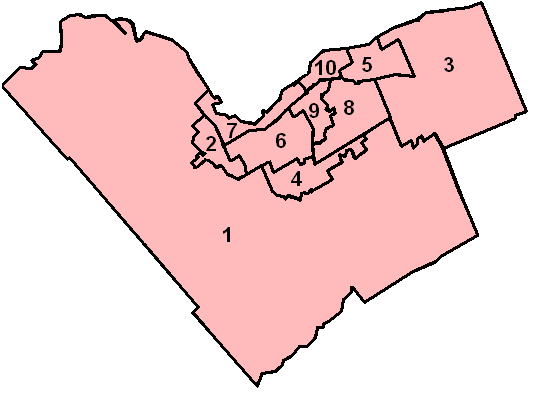
Zone map

Zone 1	Vote	%
John Curry (X)	Acclaimed	

Zone 2	Vote	%
Hudson Egbert	833	17.21%
Ted Hurley (X)	4008	82.79%

Zone 3	Vote	%
Brian Coburn	1798	35.30%
Anita MacDonald	1368	26.86%
Xavier Rankin	1251	24.56%
Marc-André Plante	457	8.97%
Michael Karpishka	219	4.30%

Zone 4	Vote	%
Alison Baizana	2982	51.55%
Cathy Maguire-Urban (X)	2803	48.45%

Zone 5	Vote	%
Katalin Sheskay (X)	Acclaimed	

Zone 6	Vote	%
Gord Butler (X)	Acclaimed	

Zone 7	Vote	%
Betty-Ann Kealey (X)	Acclaimed	

Zone 8	Vote	%
Mark Mullan (X)	Acclaimed	

Zone 9	Vote	%
Kathy Ablett (X)	2468	59.60%
John Chiarelli	1673	40.40%

Zone 10	Vote	%
Megan Crowe	890	31.38%
Tom Duggan	944	33.29%
Thérèse Maloney Cousineau (X)	1002	35.33%

=== Ottawa-Carleton District School Board ===
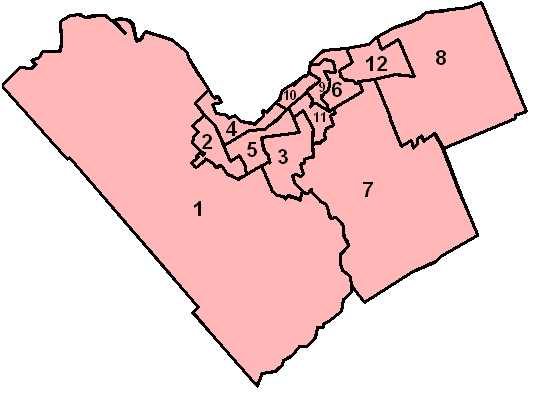
OCDSB Zone Map

Zone 1	Vote	%
Lynn Scott (X)	12394	70.95%
Todd Johnson	5075	29.05%

Zone 2	Vote	%
Cathy Curry (X)	8439	56.95%
Christine Boothby	6380	43.05%

Zone 3	Vote	%
Donna Blackburn	8177	53.84%
Allan Halfper	5779	38.05%
Ismail Mohamed	1231	8.11%

Zone 4	Vote	%
Theresa Kavanagh	6654	68.57%
Doug Lloyd (X)	2506	25.82%
Michael Pastien	544	5.61%

Zone 5	Vote	%
Pam FitzGerald (X)	6239	63.21%
Kimberly J. Brown	3631	36.79%

Zone 6	Vote	%
Bronwyn Funiciello (X)	7354	56.02%
John Marshall	4462	33.99%
Mohamoud Abdulle	1311	9.99%

Zone 7	Vote	%
Pam Morse (X)	6991	40.61%
Dave Byron	1475	8.57%
Mark Fisher	8751	50.83%

Zone 8	Vote	%
John Shea (X)	10103	79.76%
Lale Eskicioglu	2564	20.24%

Zone 9	Vote	%
Rob Campbell (X)	6329	49.22%
Helen Gruber	2215	17.23%
Julian Kirby	818	6.26%
Lorne Rachlis	2808	21.84%
Daniel Rogers	688	5.35%

Zone 10	Vote	%
Jennifer McKenzie (X)	11828	75.10%
Megan Carroll	3921	24.90%

Zone 11	Vote	%
Shirley Seward	Acclaimed	

Zone 12	Vote	%
Chris Ellis	4852	47.15%
Katie Holtzhauer	5439	52.85%

=== Conseil des écoles catholiques du Centre-Est ===
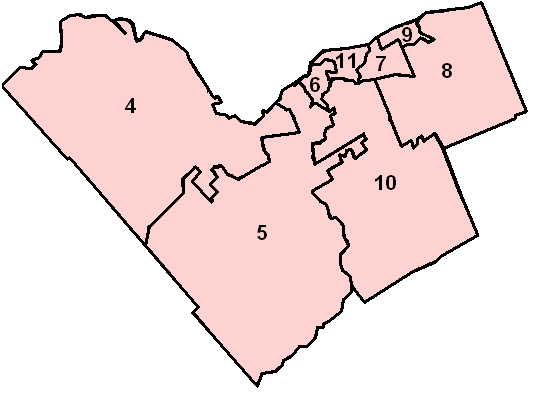
Zone map

Zone 4	Vote	%
Julie Tremblay	Acclaimed	

Zone 5	Vote	%
Andrée Newell (X)	Acclaimed	

Zone 6	Vote	%
Diane Doré (X)	Acclaimed	

Zone 7	Vote	%
André Thibodeau	Acclaimed	

Zone 8	Vote	%
Dan Boudria (X)	Acclaimed	

Zone 9	Vote	%
Johanne Lacombe	1370	38.13%
Véronique Maggiore (X)	391	10.88%
Louis-Philippe Rouillard	625	17.39%
Anick Tremblay	1207	33.59%

Zone 10	Vote	%
Monique Briand	Acclaimed	

Zone 11	Vote	%
Denis Poirier (X)	Acclaimed	

=== Conseil des écoles publiques de l'Est de l'Ontario ===
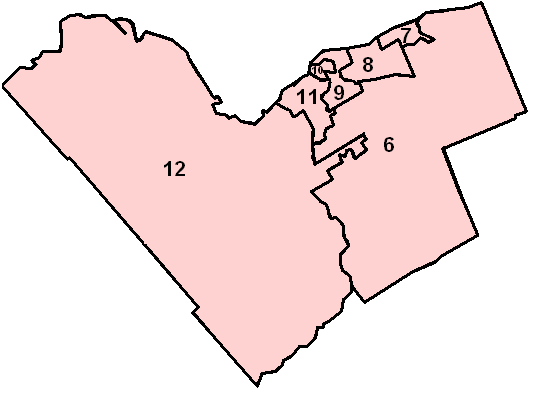
Zone map

Zone 6	Vote	%
Georges Orfali (X)	Acclaimed	

Zone 7	Vote	%
Denis Chartrand	Acclaimed	

Zone 8	Vote	%
Marie-Anne Dubois	324	17.26%
Danick LaFrance	217	11.56%
Chantal Lecours (X)	747	39.80%
Marc Roy	589	31.38%

Zone 9	Vote	%
Sylvain Bélanger	575	39.01%
Marielle Godbout (X)	899	60.99%

Zone 10	Vote	%
Lucille Collard	872	68.13%
Alexandra Samson	408	31.88%

Zone 11	Vote	%
Jean-Paul Lafond (X)	Acclaimed	

Zone 12	Vote	%
Bernard Bareilhe (X)	265	15.38%
Abdourahman Kahin	214	12.42%
Linda Savard	1244	72.20%
