= Wellington Street West =

Road and shopping area west of downtown Ottawa, Ontario, Canada

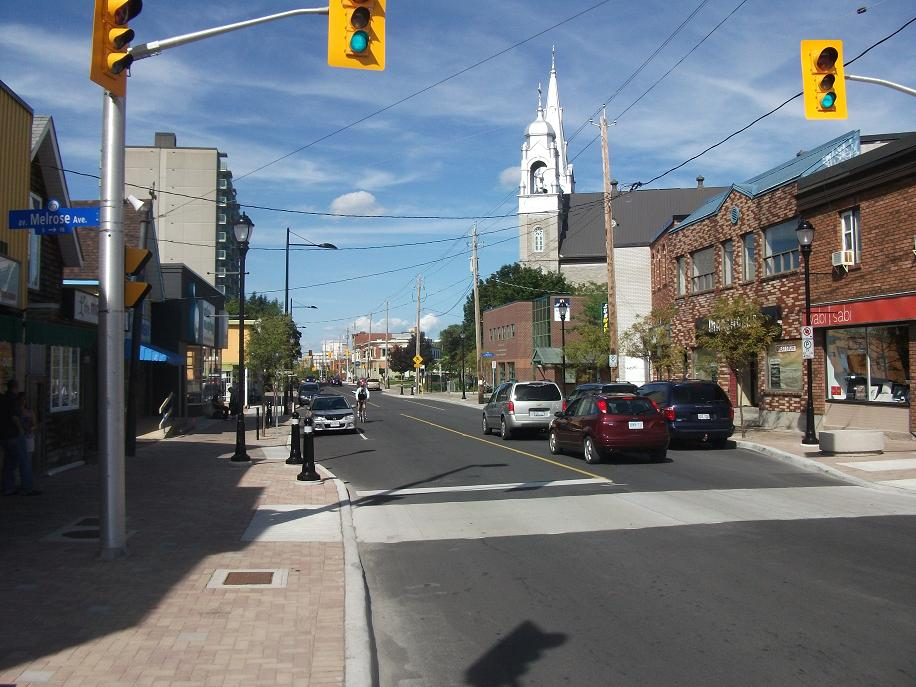
Wellington St. West in Hintonburg.

Wellington Street West (Ottawa Road #36) is a 2.3 km road and shopping area west of downtown Ottawa, Ontario. This road was once connected to - and is often confused with - the prominent Wellington Street in downtown Ottawa. But the two Wellingtons were severed in the 1960s with the expropriation of LeBreton Flats and the demolition of the viaduct that connected them over the Canadian Pacific Railway tracks.

A small remnant of the old Wellington alignment remains between Bayview Road and the small park, Somerset Square. But the modern Wellington Street West roadway is now connected with Somerset Street West, which becomes Wellington West at Garland Avenue.

The section from Somerset Street West to Holland Avenue traverses the Hintonburg neighbourhood, while the section from Holland Avenue to Island Park Drive forms the backbone of the Wellington Village community. At Island Park Drive, the roadway changes its name again to Richmond Road.

The entire Wellington Street West corridor and the surrounding shopping district contain more than 500 individual businesses and restaurants. Since 2008, these have been represented by the Wellington West Business Improvement Area.

== History ==
Wellington Street was originally Richmond Road, and is one of Ottawa's oldest roads, originating in 1818.

In 1893, Robert Cowley created a subdivision called "Ottawa West" situated between Richmond and Scott, and Western and Rockhurst. Richmond Road from 1853 until 1920 was a toll road operated by the Bytown and Nepean Road Company, with the eastern toll house located in Hintonburg and the western toll house in Bells Corners. The Bytown and Nepean Road Company purchased a lot at the western edge of the Cowley's subdivision, where Island Park Road would later be developed, and built a modest house for the tollgate keeper, a small office in the front of the house and a large bar that stretched across Richmond Road ensuring travellers stopped and paid the toll. By 1920, with the increase in automobile usage, many private road ownership was eliminated and the road was sold to the municipal government, and the toll house remained a home. The lot was sold in 1929, to the Cities Service Oil Company, which demolished the home and constructed a gas station to service the growing Wellington Village community.

The oldest surviving building in Wellington Village was built in 1896 by Joseph O'Neil, and today is Bella's Bistro.

== Wellington Street West Community Design Plan ==
The City of Ottawa's Planning Committee plan was approved and adopted by City Council on May 25, 2011. The Community Design Plan is intended to guide changes over 20 years involving zoning and urban design considerations, land development proposals, open space and community linkages, streetscape and road improvements, and civic initiatives. Wellington Street is designated as a Traditional Mainstreet, and is a mixed-use commercial street for surrounding neighbourhoods including Hintonburg, West Wellington, Laroche Park, Champlain Park, Tunney's Pasture, and Civic Hospital.

== Public Art ==
Street art and murals can be found along Wellington Street West.

=== The Wellington Marbles ===
Eighteen hand-carved marble and limestone sculptures by artists Marcus Kucey Jones and Ryan Lotecki were revealed in 2010. Each sculpture fuses the form of a fire hydrant with everyday objects connected to the surrounding neighbourhood. The marble used for the sculptures was quarried in Carrara, Italy and was selected for its fine quality and association with classical art. The Wellington Marbles were commissioned for $255,000 by the City of Ottawa for the Wellington Street West reconstruction project, and unveiled at the Wellington West Sculpture Day on September 25, 2026. The marbles can be found on Wellington Street West from Hampton Avenue to Spadina Avenue.

== Major intersections ==
The following is a list of major intersections along Wellington Street West, listed from east to west:

- Ottawa Road 81 (Bayview Road)
- Ottawa Road 36 (Somerset Street West)
- Fairmont Avenue
- Melrose Avenue
- Carruthers Avenue
- Ottawa Road 71 (Parkdale Avenue)
- Ottawa Road 67 (Holland Avenue)
- Harmer Avenue North
- Clarendon Avenue
- Western Avenue
- Island Park Drive
