= Island Park Drive =

Scenic parkway in Ottawa, Ontario, Canada

- Island Park Drive highlighted in red
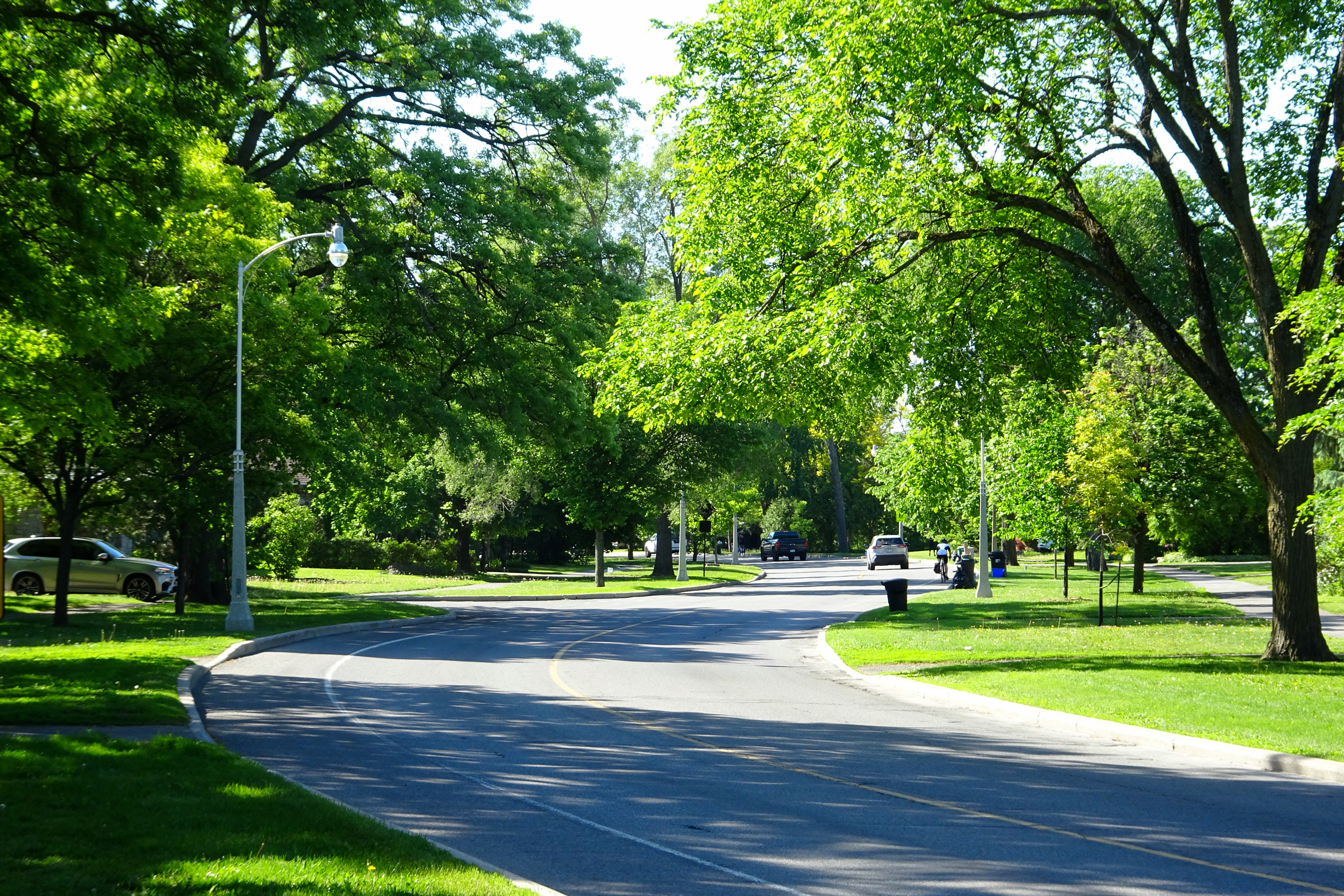

Route information
- Maintained by National Capital Commission
- Length: 3 km (1.9 mi)

Major junctions
- South end: Holland Avenue
- North end: Champlain Bridge

Location
- Country: Canada
- Province: Ontario
- Major cities: Ottawa

Highway system
- NCC parkways in Ottawa
(in alphabetical order)
← Colonel By Drive	Island Park Drive	Kichi Zibi Mikan →

Island Park Drive is a scenic parkway in Ottawa, Ontario, Canada.

== Route description ==
Many luxury homes and several embassies line the street. The north end connects to the Kichi Zibi Mikan and the Champlain Bridge, which crosses the Ottawa River into Gatineau, Quebec. Island Park Drive is named for Bate Island, the largest island crossed by the Champlain Bridge, which has a small park with road access. The south end connects to the Central Experimental Farm, where it becomes the NCC Driveway.

Island Park Drive has a northbound offramp from the westbound Queensway and no other ramps. Hampton Park is north of the Queensway and borders Island Park Drive.

Commercial vehicles are prohibited from Island Park Drive, which is a two-lane arterial road with a 40 km/h (25 mph) speed limit due to the residential nature. The parkway has a length of 3 km (1.9 mi), or 4 km (2.5 mi) if the Champlain Bridge is included.

== History ==
Island Park Drive, then called the West End Driveway, was opened in 1923. It predates the Champlain Bridge, which opened in 1927; prior to that, the road ended at the edge of the Ottawa River.

The parkway previously had multiple roundabouts along its length. The roundabout at Richmond Road was removed in 1957, and a 5-way roundabout marked its southern terminus with Carling Avenue, Holland Avenue, and the NCC Driveway for some time around 1945. These are all now signalized intersections.

During the summer of 2007, the Highway 417 overpass was replaced using a rapid replacement technology technique which uses heavy lift and rolling equipment. This process lifted out the old bridges and replaced them with new bridges built nearby. The full operation, which required about 15 hours, occurred during the night of 11-12 August 2007, and it is the first time that this method was used in Canada, although it previously was used in other countries including the United States. Multiple similar operations have since taken place along the 417 in Ottawa, including at Clyde Avenue and Carling Avenue.

== Gallery ==
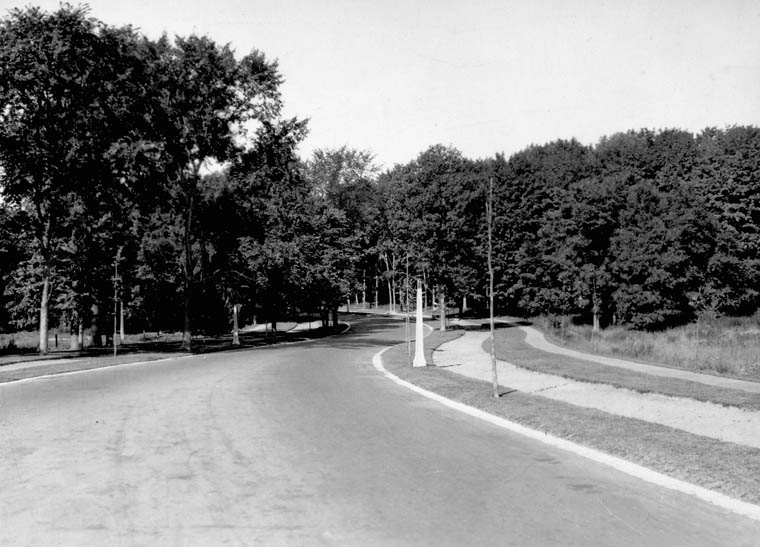
West End Driveway in the 1920s.

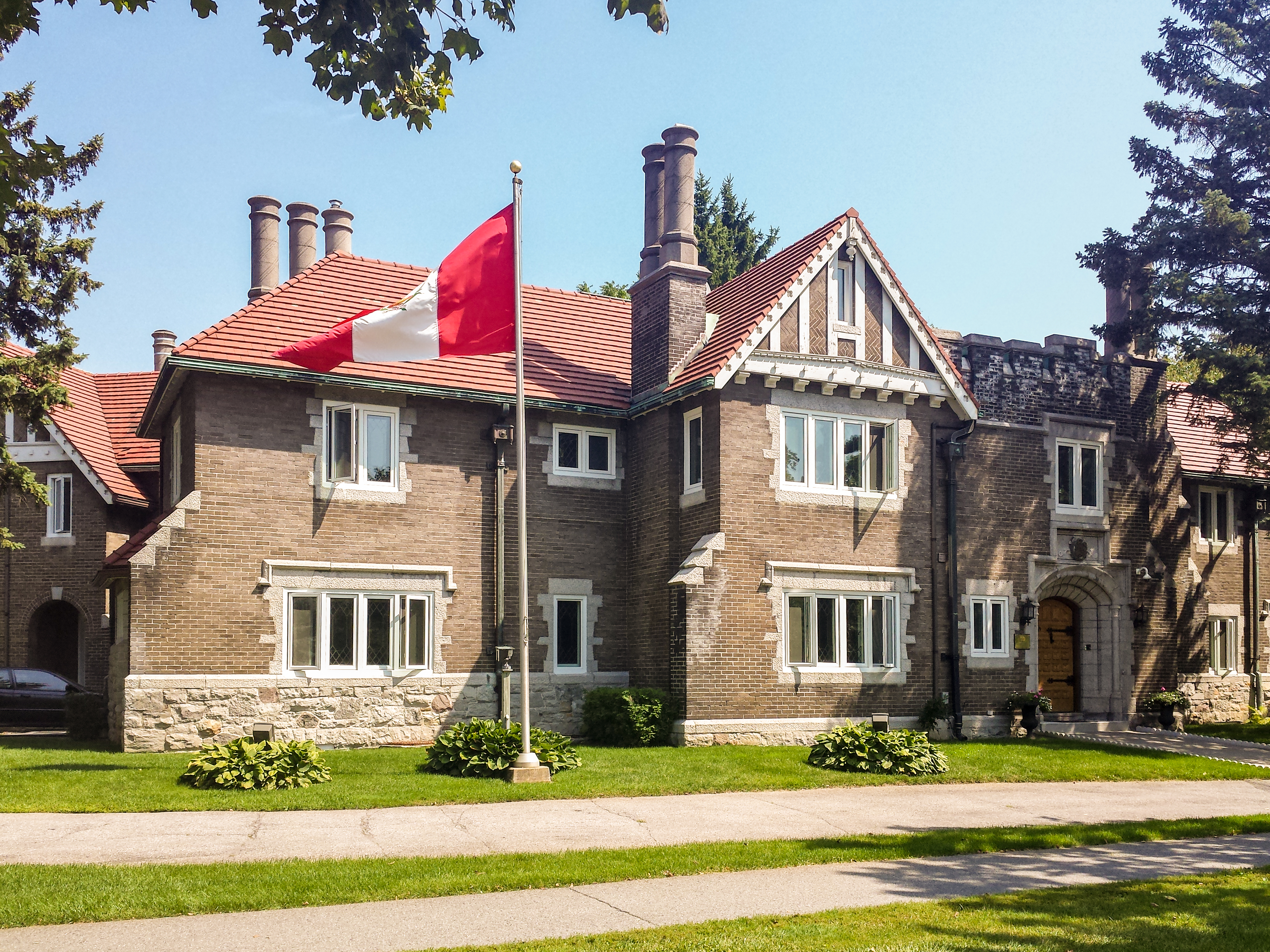
Residence of the Peruvian Ambassador to Canada at the intersection with Helena Street.
