= Hintonburg =

- Neighbourhood
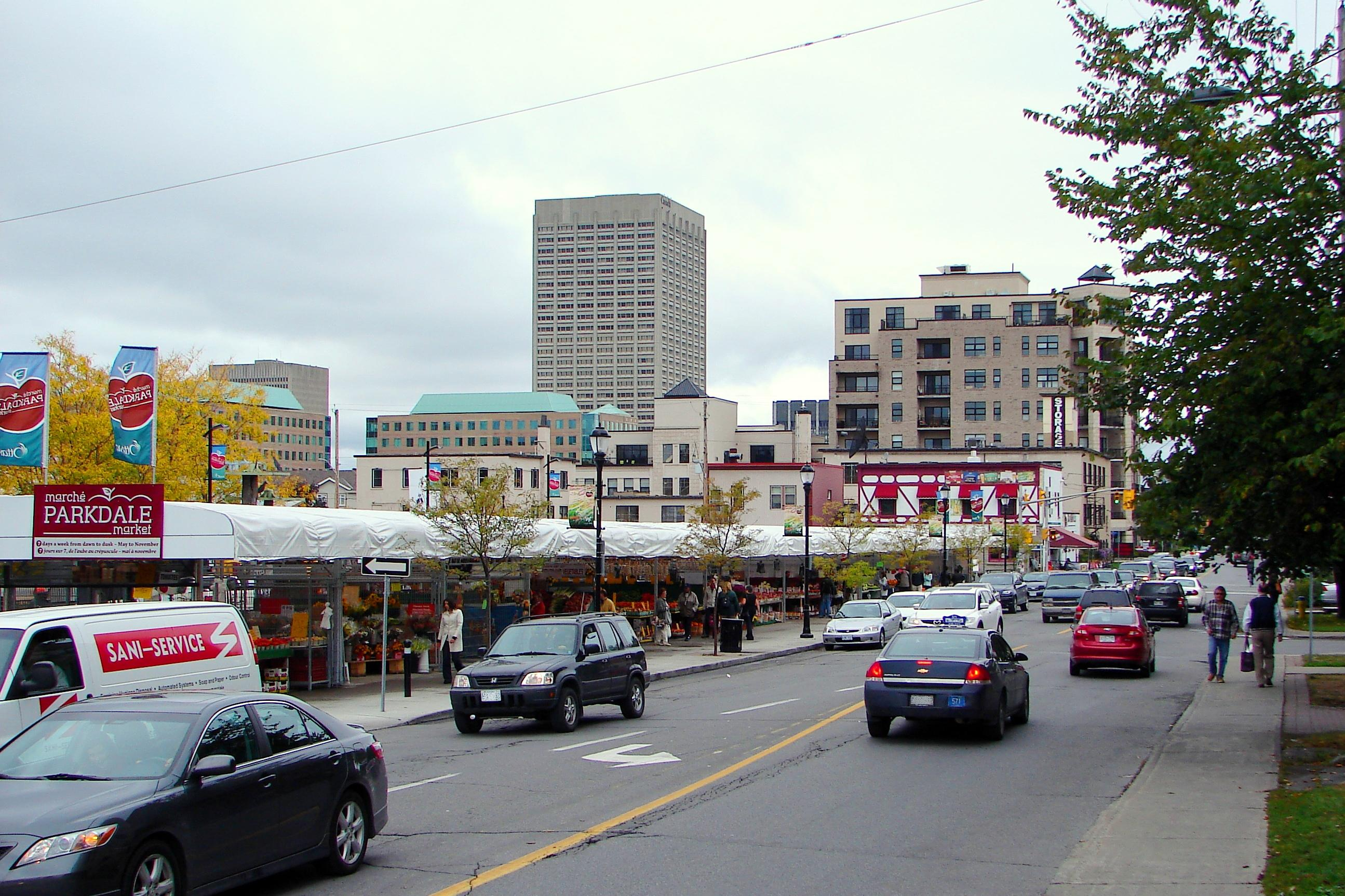
- Parkdale Avenue and the Parkdale Market

- Location in Ottawa
- Coordinates (Hintonburg Community Centre): 45°24′23″N 75°43′45″W
- Country: Canada
- Province: Ontario
- City: Ottawa
- Established: 1826
- Incorporated: 1893 (Village of Hintonburg)
- Annexation: 1907 (City of Ottawa)

Government
  - MPs: Yasir Naqvi
  - MPPs: Catherine McKenney
  - Councillor: Jeff Leiper
  - Governing body: Hintonburg Community Association
  - President: Linda Brown

Area
  - Total: 1.215 km^{2} (0.469 sq mi)
- Elevation: 65 m (213 ft)

Population (2016)
  - Total: 7,844
  - Density: 6,455.97/km^{2} (16,720.9/sq mi)
- Canada 2016 Census
- Time zone: UTC−5 (EST)
  - Summer (DST): UTC−4 (EDT)
- Forward sortation area: K1Y

Hintonburg is a neighbourhood in Kitchissippi Ward in Ottawa, Ontario, Canada, located west of the Downtown core. It is a historically working-class, predominantly residential neighbourhood, with a commercial strip located along Wellington Street West. It is home to the Parkdale Public Market, located along Parkdale Avenue, just north of Wellington. It is considered to be one of Ottawa's most "hipster" neighbourhoods.

Its eastern border is O-Train Line 2, just west of Preston Street, with Centretown West / Somerset Heights neighbourhood to the east. To the north it is bounded by O-Train Line 1 (originally the Canadian Pacific Railway main line), along Scott Street, with Mechanicsville beyond. To the south it is bounded by the Queensway (aka the 417 Highway, originally the Canadian National Railway main line) and to the west by Holland Avenue. Using the community association's borders, the population of the neighbourhood is 7844 (2016 Census).

== Character ==
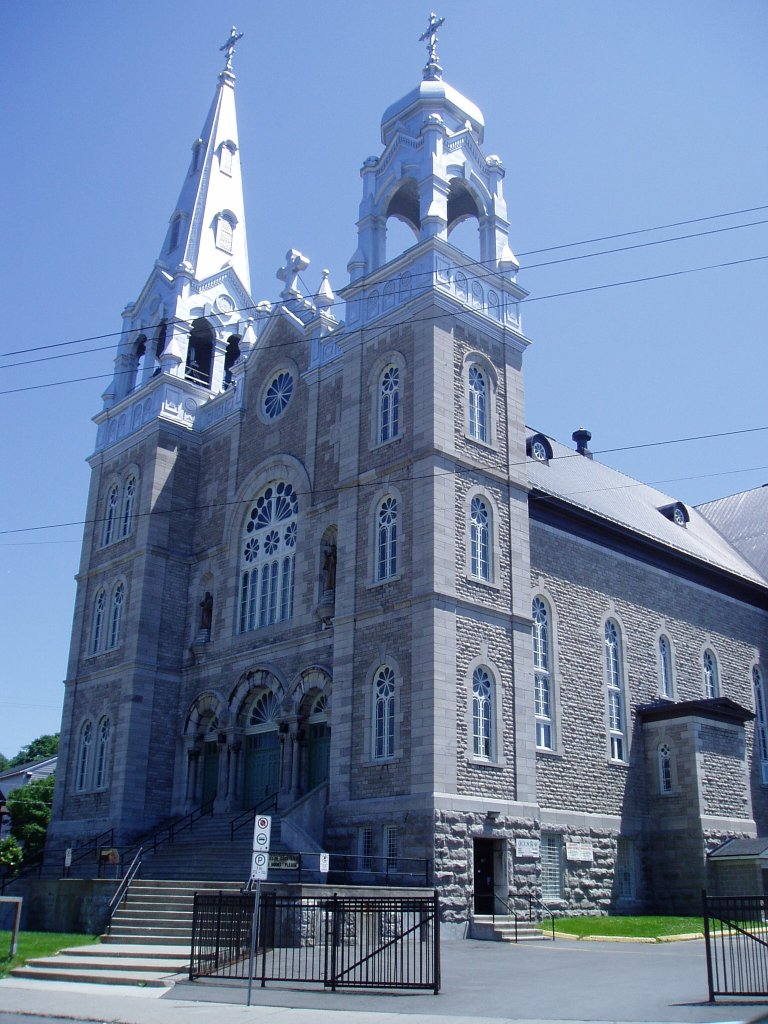
Saint-Francois d'Assise Church on Wellington

Hintonburg is very mixed in its character. The land use is mixed, and this is due to its predating land zoning rules. The area has a mix of heritage buildings and recent additions.

In its April 2007 issue, enRoute magazine named Hintonburg one of the top ten emerging neighbourhoods in Canada. The same month, Ottawa Magazine said Hintonburg is "hot" and credits the QUAD arts district as the reason residents think we're "cool". Then in June 2007, the Financial Times noted that the 'Burg is "thriving again".

=== Description ===
The area to the north of Wellington Street is very mixed, and is becoming increasingly gentrified. Some industry still exists just south of Scott to the west of Parkdale and along Scott east of Parkdale. The north-east area is almost completely residential, composed primarily of one-hundred-year-old wood 'clapboard' homes, with a small village/enclave nature. Many of the homes are very small, being built by lumber workers in the late 1800s. The area had several lumber mills, 2 as recently as the 1990s - one along Hamilton Avenue and another along Breezehill, both of which were converted to townhouse developments. The area north of Wellington was once considered part of the "Mechanicsville" neighbourhood, not Hintonburg, but the expansion of the Transitway and Scott Street have cut off this section from the area to the north.

The area to the south of Wellington is almost entirely residential of brick-veneer wood-frame construction dating to the 1910 to 1920s. There is very little commercial activity south of Wellington, except for some car repair shops along Gladstone, the Merry Dairy ice cream shop at the intersection of Fairmont and Gladstone Avenues, Heartbreakers Pizza on Parkdale Avenue one block south of Gladstone, and along the O-Train Trillium Line to the east, where the Canadian Bank Note Company operates a large facility. There are also some industrial buildings along Breezehill and the Happy Goat Coffee Company, a roastery and cafe at the intersection of Laurel and Loretta North.

To the west of Holland, in area known as Elmdale the basic pattern of land-use continues. To the south of Wellington, entirely residential. To the north, mainly residential, with smaller homes close to Scott reflecting the time when a railway ran nearby. The road known as Wellington ends here, and continues west as Richmond Road, at one time leading to the village of Richmond. Commercial activity along this street is predominantly independent businesses and offices.

=== Main streets ===
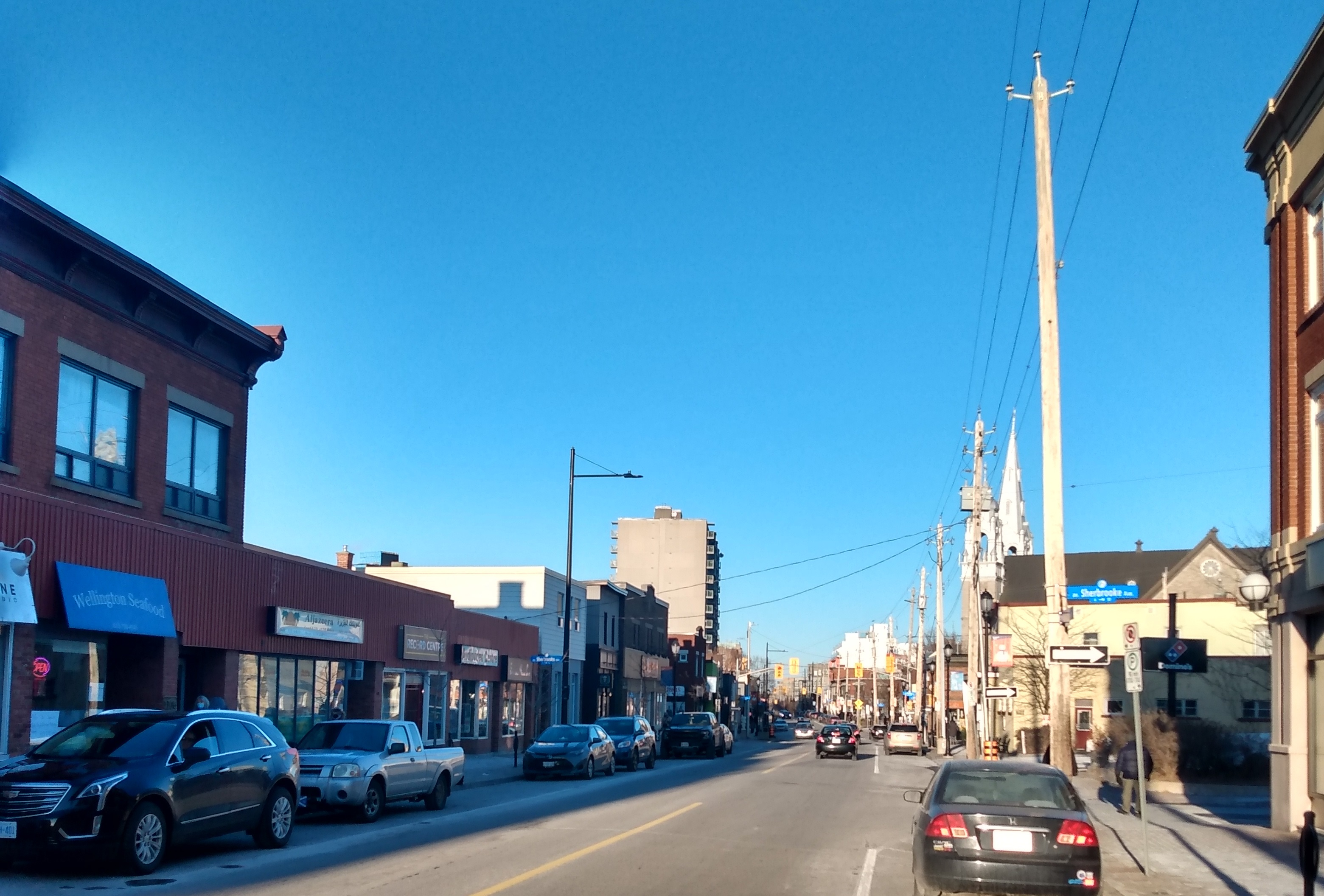
Wellington Street West in Hintonburg

Businesses on Wellington are characterised by a mixture of largely proprietor-operated retail and service shops. In the east, Wellington has not completely recovered from its being bypassed in the 1960s. Several vacant and/or underutilized properties exist. To the west, Wellington is busier, and commercial activities are thriving due to the proximity of Tunney's Pasture and the Parkdale Market. Bars and restaurants have multiplied, especially along the stretch from Parkdale to Holland. The businesses along Wellington have grouped themselves under the banner of "Wellington West" to promote their businesses.

Holland Avenue, a four-lane north–south avenue leading directly south of Tunney's Pasture, has developed a stretch of restaurants and commercial businesses to serve the government complex. At the corner of Holland and Wellington, the Irving Greenberg Theatre Centre was opened in 2007 for live theatre.

Parkdale Avenue, a two-lane north–south avenue is a busy road. When the Queensway was built in the 1960s, Parkdale was chosen for an interchange rather than the four-lane Holland Avenue. This leads to daily traffic jams at "rush hour." At its north end, some vestiges of the industrial area along the Scott Street rail line exist and are being converted into artists' space. The popular warm-weather Parkdale Market, a farmers' market, just north of Wellington is the home of about 20 stalls, of local and imported produce and flowers. To the south of Wellington, it is residential on both sides.

== Culture ==
Hintonburg is home to the QUAD. The QUAD, an acronym that stands for Quartier des artistes / Arts District, blends cultural expression, community spirit and heritage character to create a special neighbourhood that embraces all arts disciplines, was established in 2003. Several galleries have opened since 2006 in the vicinity of the Parkdale Market.

In 2005, the Hintonburg community Association (HCA) launched the ArtsPark annual event in the Parkdale Market featuring the works of Ottawa artists and musicians to highlight the community's growing role as an arts district in the city. Regular activities are put on at the Hintonburg Community Centre, including outdoor films in the summer.

=== Live theatre ===
Hintonburg is the long-time home of the Orpheus Musical Theatre Society, located on Fairmont Avenue. The Society produces several musical productions every year. The productions are mounted at the Centrepointe Theatre in Nepean.

In 2007 the Great Canadian Theatre Company (GCTC) relocated to Hintonburg, in a new theatre built at Holland and Wellington. GCTC produces original Canadian plays.

=== Churches ===
Hintonburg features a few old churches. Including Saint-François d'Assise parish. It was established in 1890 by members of the Order of Friars Minor Capuchin, refugees from compulsory military service in France, with the construction of a church, school, and monastery (since demolished). In 1902, the buildings, together with an apple orchard, were enclosed by a stone wall the remnants of which today enclose Hintonburg Park. In 1913, the present larger gothic church was built to accommodate the growing parish, reflecting the strong Francophone character of Hintonburg at this time. Today this impressive edifice dominates the neighbourhood and its bells toll the Angelus at noon and 6:00 p.m., as well as a call to Mass (liturgy). As one local resident remembered, "These bells could be heard for blocks, when rung by the Capucins." To her, "It was a pleasant happy sound."

== History ==
Originally part of Nepean Township the area was first settled in 1826, growing in size the village of Hintonburg was incorporated as a village in 1893. It was named after Joseph Hinton, a community leader who died in 1884. As the city of Ottawa grew it expanded west and Hintonburg was annexed to Ottawa in 1907. The Ahearne's Ottawa Street Railway Company ran a street car line through the area, continuing along further west along Byron Avenue (now a recreational path) and it soon became home to mostly blue collar workers who commuted into downtown.

Hintonburg used to be on the main road leading west from downtown Ottawa. Wellington Street, which starts at Parliament Hill, runs through the center of the neighbourhood to this day. Originally, the area north of Wellington was considered Mechanicsville, but over time this has changed. When the NCC took over Lebreton Flats in the 1960s, the bridge over the north–south rail line linking the central Wellington street to the Hintonburg section was demolished, and the central Wellington street was linked to Scott street, making a bypass for the automobile traffic. This led to a decline in commercial business along Wellington Street which with gentrification has been reversed. At one time, there was a department store at the crossroads of Somerset and Wellington. By the 1970s it had become the main office of the used goods charity "Ottawa Neighbourhood Services" which had to move when it was bought out in 2001 and the buyer broke his verbal contract with ONS several months following the sale. The building was then converted to commercial use, with offices and a carpet store, but which have now houses an LCBO branch and a fabrications store.

The 1950s and 1960s was a time of great change in the area. The federal government built the Tunney's Pasture office campus at the north end of Holland Avenue. The rail line along Scott Street was closed and eventually became the Transitway bus roadway. To the south, the Queensway/417 was built, partly on old rail lines, and partly directly through demolition of homes along its path. This provided another bypass around the area, and also lead to an increase of automobile traffic along Parkdale.

When a major effort to remove prostitutes from the Byward Market area was made in the early 1990s, the strip along Wellington at Somerset became an area of "streetwalkers." One notorious bar, named "Grads", located at Somerset and Bronson, burned down. It moved to Bayswater and Somerset, bringing its clientele, which used drugs. One incident outside its premises, where a man was beaten to death, led to its closure. By then the surrounding area had become known for its prostitutes, something which was only eradicated through regular crackdowns. The local Community Association worked with police and other city agencies to step up enforcement efforts against drug houses in an effort to reduce prostitution- and drug-related challenges. In one controversial development, residents had targeted "johns" by tracking and publishing partial licence plates. The Ottawa-Carleton Police set up a 'john school' whereby first-time offenders could attend instead of paying a fine and learn the effects of their trade. Community efforts were recognized with an award in 2009 for helping transform Hintonburg into a place with one of the lowest calls for police services in Ottawa.

The area continues to change. In the late 1980s, the Hintonburg Community Association (HCA) was formed, and the local residents now have a better voice in community issues and local City of Ottawa activities. The Hintonburg Community/Recreation Centre was opened, and several in-fill developments have occurred. Several of the older industrial buildings and cottages have become space to artists. The area is adapting to a new role, that of central-area residential neighbourhood, and is comparable to others in Ottawa.

In 2003, HCA published Hintonburg & Mechanicsville: A Narrative History by John Leaning, (ISBN 0-9732919-0-7); it is available in some local bookshops and through the association. A heritage walking tour of the neighbourhood is also available on their website (see link below).

In 2005, the Parkdale Fire Station, built in 1923, was renovated into commercial space. It had served as a fire hall until 1986. It then housed a food bank and artists' studios. It was named a heritage building in 1996. It is one of only four pre-1945 fire stations left in Ottawa, 1 on Bruyère St. built in 1896, 1 on Arthur St. built in 1913. and another on Sunnyside Dr. built in 1921. Its renovation was one of the first and one of the last projects funded under federal heritage building restoration funds.

=== Notable events ===
- In 1896, the very first film projected in Canada using Thomas Edison's revolutionary Vitascope technique was part of a tent show in Hintonburg put on by the Holland Brothers.

== Transportation ==
Hintonburg is accessible via Corso Italia station, Bayview station, and Tunney's Pasture station on the O-Train, and by the Route 11, and 14 buses, which runs along Wellington/Somerset and Gladstone for the neighbourhood's full length, as well as the Route 16 bus that runs along Scott beginning at Tunney's Pasture all the way to Rideau Centre and St-Paul University, via downtown. The Parkdale exit provides car access from the Queensway. Wellington St is a busy bicycle corridor, and the city painted large so called 'sharrows' on the road as well as a dooring strip, where cyclists should not use that part of the road, to avoid being hit by vehicle doors being opened by drivers. Armstrong, one street north of Wellington, is a safer alternative.

== Schools ==
- Connaught Public School is a public elementary school on Gladstone Avenue near Parkdale Avenue.
- Devonshire Community School is a public elementary school at the intersection of Somerset Street and Breezehill Avenue.
- Fisher Park Public School is a public middle school at the intersection of Holland Avenue and the 417 highway. It was formerly a high school.
- École élémentaire Saint-Francois d'Assise is an elementary school, run by the French Catholic Board, on Melrose Avenue. It is a francophone school.

== Institutions ==
Galleries

- Kitchen Wall Gallery
- 4m^{2} Four square metres gallery
- Lorraine "Fritzi" Yale Gallery
- Gladstone Clayworks Pottery Co-Op
- Enriched Bread Artists, located since 1992 in a former bread factory built by Cecil Morrison in 1924; the building is adorned with the Latin proverb: Audaces Fortuna Juvat, meaning Fortune Favors the Bold.
- The Stables Art Studios
- Gallery 3
- Orange Art Gallery

Other

- The Dorchester Review magazine lists its address as 1106 Wellington St. West, in the heart of Hintonburg.

Source: "Arts Map" (PDF). Hintonburg Community Association. Archived from the original (PDF) on 2011-03-22.
