= 1988 Ottawa-Carleton Regional Municipality elections =

Elections were held on November 14, 1988 in the Regional Municipality of Ottawa-Carleton. This page lists the election results for local mayors and councils of the RMOC in 1988.

Following the elections, Andy Haydon was re-elected as the chair of Regional Council on December 14, by the elected members of the council. He was acclaimed to the position, as no councillor nominated an opponent, though public servant Douglas Campbell had declared an interest in the job.

== Regional Council ==
The following were elected to regional council either directly on election day or by the local councils afterwards.

Position	Representing	Councillor
Chair	At-large	Andrew S. Haydon
Councillor	Mayor of Cumberland	Peter D. Clark
Councillor	Mayor of Gloucester	Harry Allen
Councillor	Gloucester, Councillor (chosen from council)	Edward Campbell
Councillor	Gloucester, Councillor (chosen from council)	Fiona Faucher
Councillor	Mayor of Goulbourn	Anton Wytenburg
Councillor	Mayor of Kanata	Des Adam
Councillor	Mayor of Nepean	Ben Franklin
Councillor	Nepean, Councillor	Gord Hunter
Councillor	Nepean, Councillor	Al Loney
Councillor	Nepean, Councillor	Frank Reid
Councillor	Mayor of Osgoode	Al Bouwers
Councillor	Mayor of Ottawa	Jim Durrell
Councillor	Ottawa, Councillor (Alta Vista)	Darrel Kent
Councillor	Ottawa, Councillor (Billings)	Joan O'Neill
Councillor	Ottawa, Councillor (Britannia)	Jim Jones
Councillor	Ottawa, Councillor (By-Rideau)	Marc Laviolette
Councillor	Ottawa, Councillor (Capital)	Lynn Smyth
Councillor	Ottawa, Councillor (Canterbury)	Michael McSweeney
Councillor	Ottawa, Councillor (Carleton)	Tim Kehoe
Councillor	Ottawa, Councillor (Carlington-Westboro)	Mark Maloney
Councillor	Ottawa, Councillor (Dalhousie)	Michael Janigan
Councillor	Ottawa, Councillor (Elmdale)	Jamie Fisher
Councillor	Ottawa, Councillor (Overbrook-Forbes)	George Kelly
Councillor	Ottawa, Councillor (Richmond)	Jacquelin Holzman
Councillor	Ottawa, Councillor (Riverside)	George Brown
Councillor	Ottawa, Councillor (St. George's)	Nancy Smith
Councillor	Ottawa, Councillor (Wellington)	Diane Holmes
Councillor	Mayor of Rideau	Glenn Brooks
Councillor	Mayor of Rockcliffe Park	Patrick J. Murray
Councillor	Mayor of Vanier	Gisèle Lalonde
Councillor	Vanier, Councillor (chosen from council)	Guy Cousineau
Councillor	Mayor of West Carleton	Eric Craig

== Cumberland ==
Mayoral race

Candidate	Vote	%
Peter D. Clark (X)	Acclaimed	

Council

Candidate	Vote	%
At-large
Linda Dunn (X)	5,099	61.44
Fernande Casey	3,200	38.56
Heights Ward; 2 to be elected
Bob Monette (X)	3,169	40.02
Frank Stacey	2,762	34.88
Sidney Marinoff	1,102	13.92
Michael Blackburn	885	11.18
Heritage Ward; 2 to be elected
Gerry Lalonde (X)	1,835	39.15
Brian Coburn (X)	1,758	37.51
Michel Marleau	1,094	23.34
Villages Ward
R. A. McInenly	561	47.54
Debbie Anderson	475	40.25
Gerry Stang	144	12.20

== Gloucester ==
Mayoral race

Candidate	Vote	%
Harry Allen	Acclaimed	

Council

Candidate	Vote	%
Gloucester East Ward; 2 to be elected
Richard Cantin (X)	5,321	42.56
Sallie Hunter (X)	4,367	34.93
Michel Dupuis	2,814	22.51
Gloucester Centre Ward
Edward Campbell	Acclaimed	
Gloucester North Ward; 3 to be elected
Fiona Faucher (X)	5,154	27.28
Murray Tufts (X)	4,297	22.74
Michael Denny	3,535	18.71
Yves J. Parent	3,297	17.45
Mary Bryden	2,612	13.82
Gloucester South Ward; 2 to be elected
Claudette Cain (X)	3,196	45.80
Mitch Owens	2,043	29.28
Harold Keenan (X)	1,739	24.92

== Goulbourn ==
Mayoral race

Candidate	Vote	%
Anton Wytenburg (X)	3,337	56.65
Ian MacDonald	2,554	43.35

Council

Candidate	Vote	%
Ward 1 - East Rural
Perce McKinley (X)	314	58.47
Ed Puccini	223	41.53
Ward 2 - Stittsville (2 to be elected)
Paul Bradley	1,714	34.87
Wayne Beston	1,147	23.33
Shawn Little	852	17.33
Tom Toomey	647	13.16
Dan Litchinsky	455	9.26
John Scrim	101	2.05
Ward 3 - Richmond
Ken Vaughn (X)	1,106	82.97
Gerhard Schneider	227	17.03
Ward 4 - West Rural
Ron Maher	605	52.56
Bill Simpson (X)	546	47.44

== Kanata ==
Mayoral race

Candidate	Vote	%
Des Adam (X)	8,122	75.39
Marianne Wilkinson	2,651	24,61

Council

Candidate	Vote	%
At-large
Eve James	Acclaimed	
Ward 1
Bill Berry	Acclaimed	
Ward 2 - Beaverbrook
Robert Hillary	1,441	62.57
Ken Braun (X)	862	37.43
Ward 3 - Katimavik-Hazeldean
Beverly Read (X)	1,358	44.57
Eileen Winterweb	877	28.78
Derek Foster	812	26.65
Ward 4 - Glen Cairn Ward
Doug Felhabler (X)	2,201	75.45
Frank MacLellan	716	24.55
Ward 5 - Bridlewood
Judy Hunter	965	57.24
Linda Makela	609	36.12
Jim Martin	112	6.64

== Nepean ==
Mayoral race

Candidate	Vote	%
Ben Franklin	Acclaimed	

Council

Candidate	Vote	%
Regional council 3 to be elected
Gord Hunter (X)	16,128	26.60
Frank Reid (X)	14,969	24.68
Al Loney	13,967	23.03
Victoria Mason	6,953	11.47
Terry Bell	5,421	8.94
Michael Koch	3,204	5.28
Bell-Barrhaven Ward
David Pratt	4,178	44.10
Doug Collins	2,889	30.49
Marey Gregory	1,340	14.14
Al Jeans	1,067	11.26
Borden Ward
Rick Chiarelli	2,685	39.97
Margaret Rywak	1,831	27.26
Barbara Bowman	1,753	26.09
Richard Stead	449	6.68
Merivale Ward
Les Casey (X)	4,483	55.18
Mary Anne King	1,916	23.58
Stan Swettenham	912	11.23
Gene Weber	813	10.01

== Osgoode ==
Mayoral race

Candidate	Vote	%
Al Bouwers (X)	2,548	51.10
Ron Stanley	1,240	24.87
Jan van der Veen	1,198	24.03

Council Four elected at large. Elected councillors indicated in bold.

Candidate	Vote	%
**Blaine Bell** (X)	3,564	22.48
**Doug Thompson**	2,874	18.13
**Albert McKeown** (X)	2,661	16.79
**Lloyd Cranston**	2,328	14.69
Marilyn Kelly	1,822	11.49
Terry Otto	1,427	9.00
George Royer	1,176	7.42

== Ottawa ==
Mayor race

Candidate	Votes	%
Jim Durrell (X)	69,813	86.77
Michael Bartholomew	4,800	5.97
John Turmel	3,123	3.88
John Kroeker	1,704	2.12
Nabil Fawzry	1,022	1.27

== Rideau ==
Mayoral race

Candidate	Vote	%
Glenn Brooks (X)	3,126	65.44
Jim Stewart	1,401	29.33
Rick Story	250	5.23

Council

Candidate	Vote	%
**Ward 1**; 2 to be elected
**Bill Schouten** (X)	980	38.60
**David Williams** (X)	886	34.90
Heinz Bloess	361	14.22
Joyce Thomasing	312	12.29
**Ward 2**; 2 to be elected
**Brian Dorling**	Acclaimed	
**Bev Rowan**	Acclaimed	
**Ward 3**; 2 to be elected
**Rich McDonald** (X)	1,189	37.78
**Mike Calnan** (X)	705	22.40
Barrie Taylor	637	20.24
Bob Saxberg	616	19.57

== Rockcliffe Park ==
Mayoral race

Candidate	Vote	%
Patrick J. Murray	Acclaimed	

Council Four elected at large. Elected councillors indicated in bold.

Candidate	Vote	%
**Bill Lawson** (X)	Acclaimed	
**Warren Langford** (X)	Acclaimed	
**Bill Stewart**	Acclaimed	
**Sheila Nelles**	Acclaimed	

== Vanier ==
Mayoral race

Candidate	Vote	%
Gisèle Lalonde (X)	3,256	57.22
Wilfrid Champagne	2,434	42.78

Council

Candidate	Vote	%
**Cummings Ward**; 2 to be elected
**Leo Lavergne**	1,042	32.14
**Guy Cousineau** (X)	902	27.82
Marcel Champagne (X)	792	24.43
Yollande Charron	506	15.61
**William D'Aoust Ward**; 2 to be elected
**Marc Grandmaître**	829	29.66
**Robert Madore** (X)	716	25.62
Ronald Killeen (X)	663	23.72
Paul St-George	476	17.03
Ghazi Eid	111	3.97
**Richelieu Ward**; 2 to be elected
**Denis Grandmaître** (X)	1,121	42.98
**Marcel Prevost**	780	29.91
Jean-Jacques Gratton (X)	707	27.11

== West Carleton ==
Mayoral race

Candidate	Vote	%
Eric Craig (X)	Acclaimed	

Council

Candidate	Vote	%
**Ward 1**; 2 to be elected
**Helga McDonald** (X)	860	29.90
**Sue Lebrun**	799	27.78
Greg MacMillan	771	26.81
Lee Chapman	248	8.62
Charles Wehner	198	6.88
**Ward 2**; 2 to be elected
**Bert Reitsma**	892	36.50
**Stewart Baird** (X)	793	32.45
Suzanne Laughlin	759	31.06
**Ward 3**; 2 to be elected
**Orville Kemp** (X)	804	26.38
**Keith Roe** (X)	748	24.54
Gary Marshall	604	19.82
Mel Scott	551	18.08
Raymond Toner	341	11.19

== Sources ==
- Ottawa Citizen, November 15, 1988, pgs C1-5
