= Kanata North Ward =

Kanata North
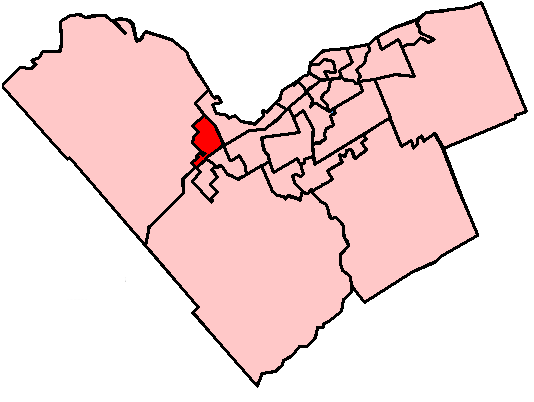
- Location within Ottawa
- Coordinates: 45°19′N 75°55′W
- Country: Canada
- Province: Ontario
- City: Ottawa

Government
  - Councillor: Cathy Curry (appointed)

Area
  - Total: 24.2 km^{2} (9.3 sq mi)

Population (Canada 2016 Census)
  - Total: 38,825
  - Density: 1,600/km^{2} (4,160/sq mi)

Languages (2016)
  - English: 61.2%
  - Mandarin: 8.6%
  - French: 7.1%
  - Arabic: 3.0%
  - Cantonese: 2.0%
  - Russian: 1.8%
  - Persian: 1.1%
  - Vietnamese: 1.1%
  - Tamil: 1.0%
  - Spanish: 1.0%

Kanata North Ward or Ward 4 (French: Quartier Kanata-Nord) is a ward in the city of Ottawa, Ontario, Canada. The ward was created in 2006 when its predecessor, Kanata Ward, split in two main parts. The original Kanata Ward covered all of the former City of Kanata. The new Kanata North Ward also includes a small part taken from West Carleton Ward (near Palladium Drive)

Its represented on Ottawa City Council by Cathy Curry. She was appointed on November 20, 2021, replacing Jenna Sudds who was elected to Parliament in the 2021 Canadian federal election.

Communities in the ward include South March, Morgan's Grant, Kanata Lakes, Marchwood, Beaverbrook and Town Centre.

Following the 2020 Ottawa Ward boundary review, the ward will gain a small piece of territory in the South March area to accommodate a proposed housing development.

Prior to its amalgamation into Ottawa, the City of Kanata had its own Kanata North Ward. It consisted of the city north of the Queensway.

== Demographics ==
According to the 2011 Canadian census

Ethnic groups: 63.9% White, 11.7% Chinese, 7.9% South Asian, 3.6% Southeast Asian, 3.3% Black, 3.2% Arab, 1.6% West Asian, 1.2% Filipino, 1.0% Latin American
Languages: 62.6% English, 9.9% Chinese, 6.9% French, 2.5% Arabic, 1.7% Russian, 1.5% Vietnamese, 1.4% Persian, 1.3% Urdu, 1.1% Spanish, 1.1% Punjabi
Religions: 56.1% Christian (28.2% Catholic, 6.5% Anglican, 6.2% United Church, 2.6% Christian Orthodox, 1.6% Baptist, 1.4% Presbyterian, 1.1% Lutheran, 8.5% Other), 8.0% Muslim, 3.3% Hindu, 2.4% Buddhist, 2.8% Others, 27.4% No religion
Median income (2010): $47,412
Average income (2010): $56,001

== Regional and city councillors ==
- Prior to 1994, the area was represented by the Mayor of Kanata. Prior to 1978, the area was represented by the Reeve of March Township.
1. John Mlacak (1969-1976)
2. Marianne Wilkinson (1976-1985)
3. Des Adam (1985-1991)
4. Merle Nicholds (1991-1994)
5. Alex Munter (1994-2003)
6. Peggy Feltmate (2003-2006)
7. Marianne Wilkinson (2006–2018)
8. Jenna Sudds (2018–2021)
9. Cathy Curry (2021–present), appointed

== Election results ==
=== 1969 Ottawa-Carleton Regional Municipality elections ===
Reeve
Candidate	Votes	%
John Mlacak	Acclaimed	

=== 1972 Ottawa-Carleton Regional Municipality elections ===
Reeve
Candidate	Votes	%
John Mlacak	Acclaimed	

=== 1974 Ottawa-Carleton Regional Municipality elections ===
Reeve
Candidate	Votes	%
John Mlacak	1,417	61.16
Marianne Wilkinson	521	22.49
John Dalton	379	16.36

=== 1976 Ottawa-Carleton Regional Municipality elections ===
Reeve
Candidate	Votes	%
Marianne Wilkinson	1,710	60.21
Bob Kingham	1,130	39.79

=== 1978 Ottawa-Carleton Regional Municipality elections ===
Mayor
Candidate	Votes	%
Marianne Wilkinson	3,599	46.24
Ihor Nakonecznyj	2,811	36.12
Pat Carroll	1,373	17.64

=== 1980 Ottawa-Carleton Regional Municipality elections ===
Mayor
Candidate	Votes	%
Marianne Wilkinson	4,132	72.39
George St. Aubin	1,576	27.61

=== 1982 Ottawa-Carleton Regional Municipality elections ===
Mayor
Candidate	Votes	%
Marianne Wilkinson	Acclaimed	

=== 1985 Ottawa-Carleton Regional Municipality elections ===
Mayor
Candidate	Votes	%
Des Adam	5,050	54.41
Marianne Wilkinson	4,232	45.59

=== 1988 Ottawa-Carleton Regional Municipality elections ===
Mayor
Candidate	Votes	%
Des Adam	8,122	75.39
Marianne Wilkinson	2,651	24.61

=== 1991 Ottawa-Carleton Regional Municipality elections ===
Mayor
Candidate	Votes	%
Merle Nicholds	6,229	50.43
Des Adam	6,122	49.57

=== 1994 Ottawa-Carleton Regional Municipality elections ===
Regional council
Candidate	Votes	%
Alex Munter	6,572	45.34
Mark Gallivan	4,546	31.36
Marianne Wilkinson	3,376	23.29

=== 1997 Ottawa-Carleton Regional Municipality elections ===
Regional council
Candidate	Votes	%
Alex Munter	Acclaimed	

=== 2000 Ottawa municipal election ===
City council
Candidate	Votes	%
Alex Munter	Acclaimed	

=== 2003 Ottawa municipal election ===
City council
Candidate	Votes	%
Peggy Feltmate	12260	70.58
Richard Rutkowski	4166	23.98
Donald Leafloor	561	3.23
Grant Johnston	384	2.21

=== 2006 Ottawa municipal election ===
City council
Candidate	Votes	%
Marianne Wilkinson	3661	36.23
Jeff Seeton	2641	26.41
Matt Muirhead	2105	20.83
Anu Bose	1606	15.89
Eric Forgrave	91	0.90

=== 2010 Ottawa municipal election ===
City council
Candidate	Votes	%
Marianne Wilkinson	4742	50.18
Jeff Seeton	4274	45.23
Lili Weemen	169	1.79
Hal Watson	146	1.54
Herntz Golmann	119	1.26

=== 2014 Ottawa municipal election ===
City council
Candidate	Vote	%
Marianne Wilkinson	4,751	46.21
Matt Muirhead	3,467	33.72
Jeff Seeton	2,063	20.07

Ottawa mayor (Ward results)
Candidate	Vote	%
Jim Watson	7,726	76.78
Mike Maguire	1,807	17.96
Anwar Syed	194	1.93
Rebecca Pyrah	114	1.13
Robert White	79	0.79
Darren W. Wood	67	0.67
Bernard Couchman	41	0.41
Michael St. Arnaud	35	0.35

=== 2018 Ottawa municipal election ===
Council candidate	Vote	%
Jenna Sudds	5,298	46.68
Matt Muirhead	3,634	32.02
David Gourlay	2,335	20.57
Lorne Neufeldt	56	0.49
Philip Bloedow	27	0.24

Ottawa mayor (Ward results)
Candidate	Vote	%
Jim Watson	7,606	74.42
Clive Doucet	1,935	18.93
Michael Pastien	128	1.25
Bruce McConville	107	1.05
Craig MacAulay	87	0.85
Ahmed Bouragba	86	0.84
Hamid Alakozai	64	0.63
Joey Drouin	54	0.53
James T. Sheahan	51	0.50
Moises Schachtler	40	0.39
Bernard Couchman	33	0.32
Ryan Lythall	30	0.29

=== 2022 Ottawa municipal election ===
Council candidate	Vote	%
Cathy Curry	8,827	76.75
Viorel Copil	1,583	13.37
Christine Moulaison	1,136	9.88

=== 2026 Ottawa municipal election ===
2026 Ottawa municipal election: Kanata North
Candidate	Popular vote			Expenditures
Candidate	Votes	%	±%	Expenditures
Cathy Curry (X)	9,084	73.67		
Rob Millan	2,401	19.47		
James Murchison	846	6.86		
Total valid votes	12,598			
Total rejected, unmarked and declined votes				
Turnout		35.98		
Eligible voters	35,011			
Note: Candidate campaign colours are based on the prominent colour used in campaign items (signs, literature, etc.) and are used as a visual differentiation between candidates.
