= 1985 Ottawa-Carleton Regional Municipality elections =

Elections were held on November 12, 1985, in the Regional Municipality of Ottawa-Carleton. This page lists the election results for local mayors and councils of the RMOC in 1985.

== Regional Council ==
The following were elected to regional council either directly on election day or by the local councils afterward. Chair Andy Haydon was re-elected by council without any opposition.

Position	Representing	Councillor
Chair	At-large	Andrew S. Haydon
Councillor	Mayor of Cumberland	Peter D. Clark
Councillor	Mayor of Gloucester	Harry Allen
Councillor	Gloucester, Councillor (chosen from council)	Claudette Cain
Councillor	Gloucester, Councillor (chosen from council)	Richard Cantin
Councillor	Mayor of Goulbourn	Anton Wytenburg
Councillor	Mayor of Kanata	Des Adam
Councillor	Mayor of Nepean	Ben Franklin
Councillor	Nepean, Councillor	Gord Hunter
Councillor	Nepean, Councillor	Frank Reid
Councillor	Nepean, Councillor	Beryl Gaffney
Councillor	Mayor of Osgoode	Al Bouwers
Councillor	Mayor of Ottawa	Jim Durrell
Councillor	Ottawa, Councillor (Alta Vista)	Darrel Kent
Councillor	Ottawa, Councillor (Billings)	Joan O'Neill
Councillor	Ottawa, Councillor (Britannia)	Ruth Wildgen
Councillor	Ottawa, Councillor (By-Rideau)	Marc Laviolette
Councillor	Ottawa, Councillor (Capital)	Rob Quinn
Councillor	Ottawa, Councillor (Canterbury)	Michael McSweeney
Councillor	Ottawa, Councillor (Carleton)	Tim Kehoe
Councillor	Ottawa, Councillor (Queensboro)	Mark Maloney
Councillor	Ottawa, Councillor (Dalhousie)	Mac Harb
Councillor	Ottawa, Councillor (Elmdale)	Jamie Fisher
Councillor	Ottawa, Councillor (Overbrook-Forbes)	George Kelly
Councillor	Ottawa, Councillor (Richmond)	Jacquelin Holzman
Councillor	Ottawa, Councillor (Riverside)	George Brown
Councillor	Ottawa, Councillor (St. George's)	Nancy Smith
Councillor	Ottawa, Councillor (Wellington)	Diane Holmes
Councillor	Mayor of Rideau	Glenn Brooks
Councillor	Mayor of Rockcliffe Park	Patrick J. Murray
Councillor	Mayor of Vanier	Gisèle Lalonde
Councillor	Vanier, Councillor (chosen from council)	Ronald Killeen
Councillor	Mayor of West Carleton	Eric Craig

== Cumberland ==
Mayoral race

Candidate	Vote	%
Peter D. Clark (X)	4,183	80.94
Michael Slade	985	19.06

Council

Candidate	Vote	%
At-large
Ray Friel (X)	3,491	68.37
Terry Pelletier	1,615	31.63
Heights Ward; 2 to be elected
Bob Monette	1,372	34.84
Fern Casey	1,012	25.70
Doris Douma	995	25.27
Sandra Graham	559	14.20
Heritage Ward; 2 to be elected
Gerry Lalonde (X)	Acclaimed	
Brian Coburn (X)	Acclaimed	
Villages Ward
Paul Macdonell (X)	620	62.25
Patricia Wright	213	21.39
Gerry Stang	163	16.37

== Gloucester ==
Mayoral race

Candidate	Vote	%
Harry Allen	7,390	37.97
Mitch Owens (X)	6,257	32.15
Royal Galipeau	5,814	29.88

Council

Candidate	Vote	%
Gloucester Centre Ward
Edward Campbell	1,402	50.13
Evelyn Grover (X)	1,395	49.87
Gloucester North Ward; 3 to be elected
Eugène Bellemare (X)	4,648	23.36
Ken Steele (X)	3,349	16.83
Murray Tufts	2,643	13.28
Fiona Faucher	2,541	12.77
Mary Bryden	2,389	12.01
Ray Kaluski	2,346	11.79
Emile Morin	1,980	9.95
Gloucester South Ward; 2 to be elected
Claudette Cain	1,705	33.53
Harold Keenan (X)	1,283	25.23
Gordon Lundy	1,162	22.85
Jeff Slater	935	18.39

== Goulbourn ==
Mayoral race

Candidate	Vote	%
Anton Wytenburg (X)	3,222	71.35
Ian MacDonald	1,294	28.65

Council

Candidate	Vote	%
Ward 1
Perce McKinley	476	52.31
Edmund Puccini	280	30.77
Thomas Toomey	154	16.92
Ward 2
Roger Griffiths (X)	801	56.21
Joseph Brown	624	43.79
Ward 3
Ken Vaughn (X)	817	66.86
Bert O'Grady	405	33.14
Ward 4
Bill Simpson	531	55.78
Bill Jackson	421	44.22

Hydro Commission

- Four to be elected

Candidate	Vote	%
Bruce Wilson	Acclaimed	
Don Salder	Acclaimed	
Tolvo Oks	Acclaimed	
Glen Fisher	Acclaimed	

== Kanata ==
Mayoral race

Candidate	Vote	%
Des Adam	5,050	54.41
Marianne Wilkinson	4,232	45.59

Council

Candidate	Vote	%
At-large
Eva James	3,206	35.20
Bill Lund	2,382	26.15
Hank Docter	1,1818	19.96
Doug Nash	1,702	18.69
Ward 1 - March
Bill Berry	Acclaimed	
Ward 2 - Beaverbook
Ken Braun	Acclaimed	
Ward 3 - Katimavik-Hazeldean
Bev Read	1,345	58.50
Frank Rezny	954	41.50
Ward 4 - Glen Cairn Ward
Doug Felhabler	1,345	43.64
T. MacMillan	1,110	36.02
M. Beninger	627	20.34
Ward 5 - Bridlewood
Andy Nellestyn	Acclaimed	

== Nepean ==
Mayoral race (259 of 260 polls)

Candidate	Vote	%
Ben Franklin (X)	17,976	92.75
John C. Turmel	1,405	7.25

Council (259 of 260 polls)

Candidate	Vote	%
Regional council 3 to be elected
Gord Hunter (X)	11,691	24.04
Frank Reid	9,906	20.37
Beryl Gaffney (X)	9,519	19.57
Margaret Ellen Rywak	8,873	18.24
Rick Chiarelli	7,649	15.73
Andrew Dynowski	997	2.05
Bell-Barrhaven Ward
Al Loney	2,896	51.52
Marcy Gregory	1,595	28.38
Al Jeans	1,130	20.10
Borden Ward
Al Brown (X)	Acclaimed	
Merivale Ward
Les Casey	2,168	29.30
William Van Westerop	2,068	27.95
Hugh McDonald (X)	1,854	25.06
Terry Bell	1,309	17.69

Hydro Commission

- 258 of 260 polls
- Four to be elected

Candidate	Vote	%
Martin J. Montague (X)	10,989	19.85
Ed Lauer (X)	9,985	18.03
Mervyn F. Sullivan (X)	9,342	16.87
Kathy Grainer	7,918	14.30
Brian P. Beckett	6,865	12.40
Borden Scullion	5,166	9.33
J. Martin Connelly	5,105	9.22

== Osgoode ==
Mayoral race

Candidate	Vote	%
Albert Bouwers (X)	Acclaimed	

Council Four elected at large. Elected councillors indicated in bold.

Candidate	Vote	%
**Blaine Ball**	2,744	25.46
**Albert McKeown** (X)	1,666	15.46
**Mary Cooper** (X)	1,591	14.76
**Fred Alexander** (X)	1,358	12.60
Doug Thompson	1,335	12.39
Jim Poushinksy	1,050	9.74
Jan Van der Veen	554	5.14
Pat van Velthoven	478	4.44

== Ottawa ==
Mayor race

Candidate	Votes	%
Jim Durrell	56,988	59.95
Marlene Catterall	35,711	37.57
R. Allan Jones	942	0.99
Walter J. McPhee	886	0.93
Nabil Fawzry	529	0.56

== Rideau ==
Mayoral race

Candidate	Vote	%
Glenn Brooks	2,161	53.52
Dave Bartlett (X)	1,877	46.48

Council

Candidate	Vote	%
**Ward 1**; 2 to be elected
**Bill Schouten** (X)	748	29.97
**Dave Williams**	688	27.56
Garnet Donnelly	431	17.27
Joyce Thomasing	262	10.50
Wanda Iafrate	154	6.17
Heinz Bloess	142	6.17
Alex Hayward	71	2.84
**Ward 2**; 2 to be elected
**Bryan Dorling** (X)	760	39.07
**Jim Stewart** (X)	613	31.52
Patrick Dooley	572	29.41
**Ward 3**; 2 to be elected
**Richard McDonald** (X)	Acclaimed	
**Mike Calnan** (X)	Acclaimed	

== Rockcliffe Park ==
Mayoral race

Candidate	Vote	%
Patrick J. Murray	594	55.72
Shelagh M'Gonigle	472	44.28

Council Four elected at large. Elected councillors indicated in bold.

Candidate	Vote	%
**Bill Lawson**	635	16.54
**Wendy Porteous**	437	11.38
**John Richard** (X)	403	10.49
**Warren Langford**	388	10.10
Michael Baylin	344	8.96
David Barr	276	7.19
Stuart Bell	268	6.98
Anthony Keith	253	6.59
Graeme Forrester	236	6.15
Paula Smith	200	5.21
Chantal Gobeil	178	4.64
Sharon Gill	160	4.17
Lia Diegel	62	1.61

== Vanier ==
Mayoral race

Candidate	Vote	%
Gisèle Lalonde	2,416	40.74
Wilfrid Champagne	1,781	30.03
Bunny McCann	1,653	27.87
Blanche Lapointe-Michaud	81	1.37

Council

Candidate	Vote	%
**Cummings Ward**; 2 to be elected
**Guy Cousineau** (X)	1,113	33.82
**Marcel Champagne**	898	27.29
Paul St-Georges (X)	670	20.36
Yollande Charron	610	18.54
**William D'Aoust Ward**; 2 to be elected
**Ronald Killeen** (X)	958	38.24
**Robert Madore** (X)	779	31.10
Fernand Lavictoire	473	18.88
Carol Luc Bigras	295	11.78
**Richelieu Ward**; 2 to be elected
**Denis Grandmaître**	983	34.85
**Jean-Jacques Gratton** (X)	725	25.70
Roger Parisien (X)	669	23.71
Michael Sikorsky	444	15.74

== West Carleton ==
Mayoral race

Candidate	Vote	%
Eric Craig (X)	3,160	62.69
Frank Marchington	1,881	37.31

Council

Candidate	Vote	%
**Ward 1**; 2 to be elected
**Betty Smith**	946	36.68
**John Shipman** (X)	820	31.80
Delmer Wilson (X)	813	31.52
**Ward 2**; 2 to be elected (11/12 of polls)
**Carolyn Sparrow** (X)	1,062	35.90
**Stewart Baird**	735	24.85
Bob Dowd (X)	663	22.41
Faye Reitsma	498	16.84
**Ward 3**; 2 to be elected
**Orville Kemp**	983	33.87
**Keith Roe** (X)	970	33.43
Gerry Belisle (X)	949	32.70

== Sources ==
- Ottawa Citizen, November 13, 1985
