= 1994 Ottawa-Carleton Regional Municipality elections =

1994 Ottawa-Carleton Regional chair election
- November 14, 1994
Nominee	Peter D. Clark	Frank Reid
Popular vote	106,786	55,352
Percentage	55.00%	28.51%
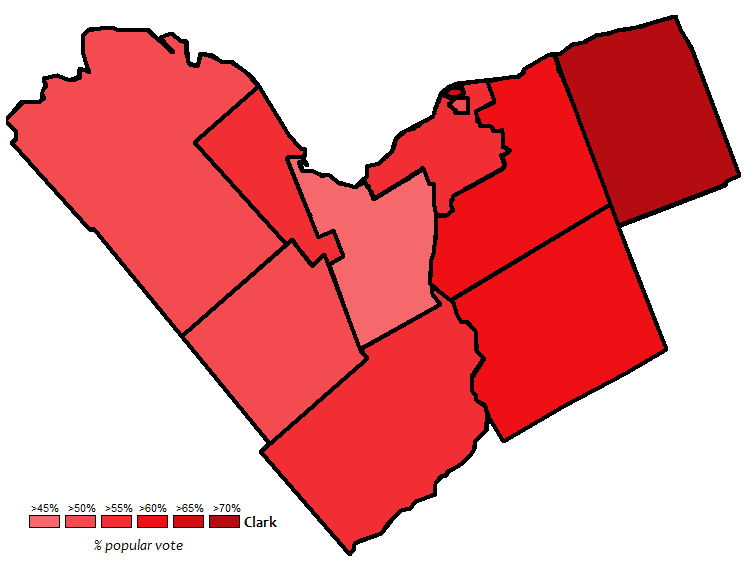
- Results by municipality
Chair before election
Peter D. Clark
Elected Chair
Peter D. Clark

Elections were held on November 14, 1994 in the Regional Municipality of Ottawa-Carleton. This page lists the election results for Regional Chair, Regional Council, and local mayors and councils of the RMOC in 1994. The 1994 election was the first election for a separate regional council.

Results were as follows:

== Regional Chair of Ottawa-Carleton ==
Candidate	Vote	%
Peter Clark (X)	106,786	55.00
Frank Reid	55,352	28.51
Victoria Masson	15,365	7.91
Jim Jones	5,719	2.95
John Turmel	4,563	2.35
Ron Parker	2,446	1.26
Lance Richardson	2,183	1.12
William Ikkers	1,727	0.89

== Regional Council ==
Wards were not given names until 1997.

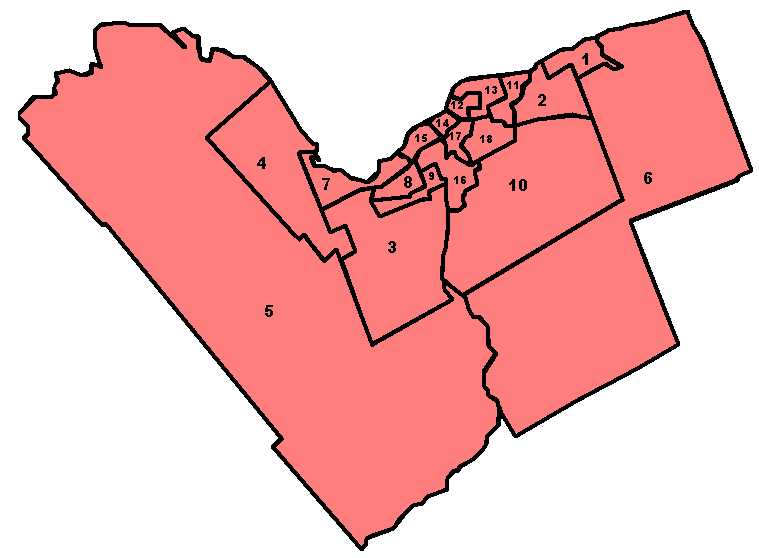
Map of the RMOC's Wards used in this election

Ward 1
Candidate	Votes	%
Herb Kreling	3,275	
Bob Monette	3,251	
Keith De Cruz	3,118	
Bernard Pelot	766	
Stan Lamothe	371	

Ward 2
Candidate	Votes	%
Richard Cantin	4,245	
Ed Campbell	3,800	
Ian A. G. Campbell	414	

Ward 3
Candidate	Votes	%
David Pratt	Acclaimed	

Ward 4
Candidate	Votes	%
Alex Munter	6,572	45.34
Mark Gallivan	4,546	31.36
Marianne Wilkinson	3,376	23.29

Ward 5
Candidate	Votes	%
Betty Hill	6,619	
Roland Armitage	6,544	
Mike Bryan	3,047	

Ward 6
Candidate	Votes	%
Robert van den Ham	Acclaimed	

Ward 7
Candidate	Votes	%
Alex Cullen	8,009	
Betty-Ann Kealey	3,355	
Andy Sammon	1,037	

Ward 8
Candidate	Votes	%
Al Loney	4,269	
Jay Acton	3,595	
Stan McBride	1,748	
Kevin Kinsella	1,592	

Ward 9
Candidate	Votes	%
Gord Hunter	5,261	
Richard Stead	3,767	

Ward 10
Candidate	Votes	%
Dan Beamish	6,091	60.84
James McMahon	1,484	14.82
Moe Royer	1,394	13.92
Kenneth McCarthy	1,042	10.41

Ward 11
Candidate	Votes	%
Michel Bellemare	3,582	
Fiona Faucher	3,389	
Christian Bilinsky	1,034	

Ward 12
Candidate	Votes	%
Madeleine Meilleur	7,702	
Laurie Gourlay	2,055	

Ward 13
Candidate	Votes	%
Jacques Legendre	3,317	
Julie Taub	2,348	
Joan Gullen	2,059	
George Kelly	1,893	

Ward 14
Candidate	Votes	%
Diane Holmes	6,496	
Dale Curwin	1,080	
Ross Taylor	742	
Bill Overall	222	

Ward 15
Candidate	Votes	%
Linda Davis	4,071	
Marian Lothian	3,579	
Art Pope	3,166	

Ward 16
Candidate	Votes	%
Wendy Stewart	7,315	
Val Parkinson	2,797	

Ward 17
Candidate	Votes	%
Brian McGarry	5,027	
Nancy Mitchell	4,660	
Beatrice Costisella	269	

Ward 18
Candidate	Votes	%
Peter Hume	11,142	
Rebecca Liff	1,172	
Sean Abdallah	1,166	

== Cumberland ==
Mayoral race

Candidate	Vote	%
Brian Coburn (X)	10,813	88.42
Sam Haider	1,416	11.58

Council

Candidate	Vote	%
Queenswood Ward
Frank Stacey	2,766	
Arthur Pennington	844	
Bilberry Ward
Dave Lewis	1,514	
Vic Powell	476	
Jeffrey Leiper	70	
Fallingbrook Ward
Frank Dugal	1,682	
Marieme Pennington	454	
Arnold Stirajs	447	
Syed Haider	142	
Heritage Ward
Gerry Lalonde	Acclaimed	

== Gloucester ==
Mayoral race

Candidate	Vote	%
Claudette Cain (X)	23,518	90.52
Jaffar Hashmi	2,462	9.48

Council

Candidate	Vote	%
Gloucester North Ward
Michael Denny	2,494	
Mary A. Bryden	2,060	
Jeff Slater	647	
James Spencer	143	
Cyrville Ward
Patricia Clark (X)	1,347	
Joe T. Saab	671	
Harold G. Keenan	439	
Masood Ghavami	150	
Blackburn Hamlet Ward
Rainer Bloess	1,835	
Phil Benson	699	
Joyce Hum	447	
Neil MacIntosh	420	
Orleans North Ward
René Danis (X)	2,347	
Ken Vowles	1,383	
Al Dzikowski	479	
Brad Kennedy	282	
Shirley Fleishhaker	178	
Richard Beecroft	83	
Orleans South Ward
Frank J. Cauley (X)	2,395	
Gary J. Jessup	2,214	
Gloucester South Ward
George Barrett	3,015	70.33
George Saade	873	20.36
Brent P. Colbert	399	9.31

== Goulbourn ==
Mayoral race

Candidate	Vote	%
Paul Bradley (X)	Acclaimed	

Council

Candidate	Vote	%
Ward 1
Janet Stavinga	854	
M. Wayne Beaten (X)	802	
Ward 2
Allan Ryan	902	
Leslie Haubrich (X)	879	
Ward 3
Steven Lewis	726	
Ron Mahar (X)	700	
Leigh Poirier	334	
Ward 4
Bob Miller (X)	Acclaimed	

== Kanata ==
Mayoral race

Candidate	Vote	%
Merle Nicholds (X)	10,141	
Ian Cumming	3,068	
Richard Brazeau	1,280	

Council

Candidate	Vote	%
Kanata North Ward
Sheila McKee	1,706	
Christopher Hollands	872	
Ian Hunter	871	
Jim Shearon	580	
Jim Malone	269	
Ronald Frye	81	
Katimavik/Hazeldean Ward
Tom Flood	Acclaimed	
Glen Cairn Ward
Pam Cripps	1,129	
Graham Ball	1,059	
Doug Parsons	865	
Bridlewood Ward
Eva James	1,827	
Stu Chandler	1,264	

== Nepean ==
Mayoral race

Candidate	Vote	%
Ben Franklin (X)	23,463	76.13
Al Speyers	7,357	23.87

Council

Candidate	Vote	%
Lakeshore Ward
Merynv Sullivan	1,301	
Ted Ladelphia	872	
Giorgio DiFranco	336	
Nepean Centre Ward
Rick Chiarelli	3,202	
Beth Graham	2,840	
Jim Wisking	151	
Evergreen Ward
Molly McGoldrick-Larsen	2,011	
Lily Dea	1,762	
Ron Edwards	1,353	
William Frampton	159	
Knoxdale Ward
Margaret Rywak	2,458	
Shayna Shuster (X)	2,249	
Joseph Ben-Ami	401	
Merivale Ward
Lee Ann Farnworth	3,553	
Les Casey (X)	1,625	
Tonis Kasvand	74	
Barrhaven Ward
Doug Collins (X)	3,304	
Kim Millan	1,902	
Nick Dean	477	

== Osgoode ==
Mayoral race

Candidate	Vote	%
Lloyd Cranston	3,374	67.78
Mary Cooper	1,604	32.22

Council Four elected at large. Elected councillors indicated in bold.

Candidate	Vote	%
**Doug Thompson** (X)	3,900	
**Dwayne Acres**	3,796	
**Vera Mitchell** (X)	3,383	
**Dale Harvey**	2,659	
Robert Brown	2,016	
Claudette Cyr-Smith	774	

== Ottawa ==
Mayoral race

Candidate	Vote	%
Jacquelin Holzman (X)	34,117	36.95
Joan O'Neill	28,818	31.21
Tim Kehoe	24,803	26.86
Diane McIntyre	2,925	3.17
Alexander Saikaley	1,677	1.82

== Rideau ==
Mayoral race

Candidate	Vote	%
James C. Stewart	2,243	50.33
Bryan Dorling	2,214	49.67

Council

Candidate	Vote	%
**Ward 1**
Glenn Brooks	ACCLAIMED	
**Ward 2**
Don Stephenson	1,195	
Gord Angus	552	
**Ward 3**
Rob Fraser	ACCLAIMED	
**Ward 4**
Anne Robinson	859	
Neol Norenius	374	

== Rockcliffe Park ==
Mayoral race

Candidate	Vote	%
Patrick J. Murray	ACCLAIMED	

Council Four elected at large. Elected councillors indicated in bold.

Candidate	Vote	%
**Gordon Roston**	478	
**Jane Dobell**	380	
**John Bull**	367	
**James Taylor**	350	
Howard Wirth	301	
Alan Cooke	209	
Norma Young-MacLean	189	
Carmine Domenicucci	124	

== Vanier ==
Mayoral race

Candidate	Vote	%
Guy Cousineau (X)	ACCLAIMED	

Council

Candidate	Vote	%
**Cummings Ward**
Diane Doré	ACCLAIMED	
**William D'Aoust Ward**
Robert Crête	850	
Marc Grandmaître	592	
A. J. Plant	81	
**Richelieu Ward**
Yvon Dubé	620	
Denis Grandmaître	610	
**St. Charles Ward**
Sylvain Boyer	588	
Léo Lavergne	344	

== West Carleton ==
Mayoral race

Candidate	Vote	%
Dwight Eastman (X)	3,140	56.36
Sue LeBrun	2,431	43.64

Council

Candidate	Vote	%
**Ward 1**
Dan MacMillan (X)	904	
Helga McDonald	486	
Lorraine Lortie	64	
Keith Payles	49	
**Ward 2**
Bert Reitsma (X)	Acclaimed	
**Ward 3**
John Caldwell (X)	652	
Bob Kerr	534	
**Ward 4**
Orville Kemp (X)	Acclaimed	
