= 2006 Ottawa municipal election =

Election in Ontario, Canada

2006 Ottawa mayoral election
- November 13, 2006
- Turnout: ~54% (▲ ~21pp)
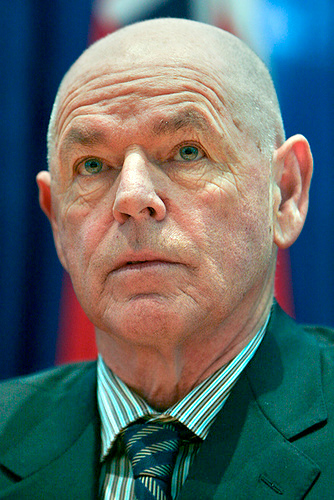

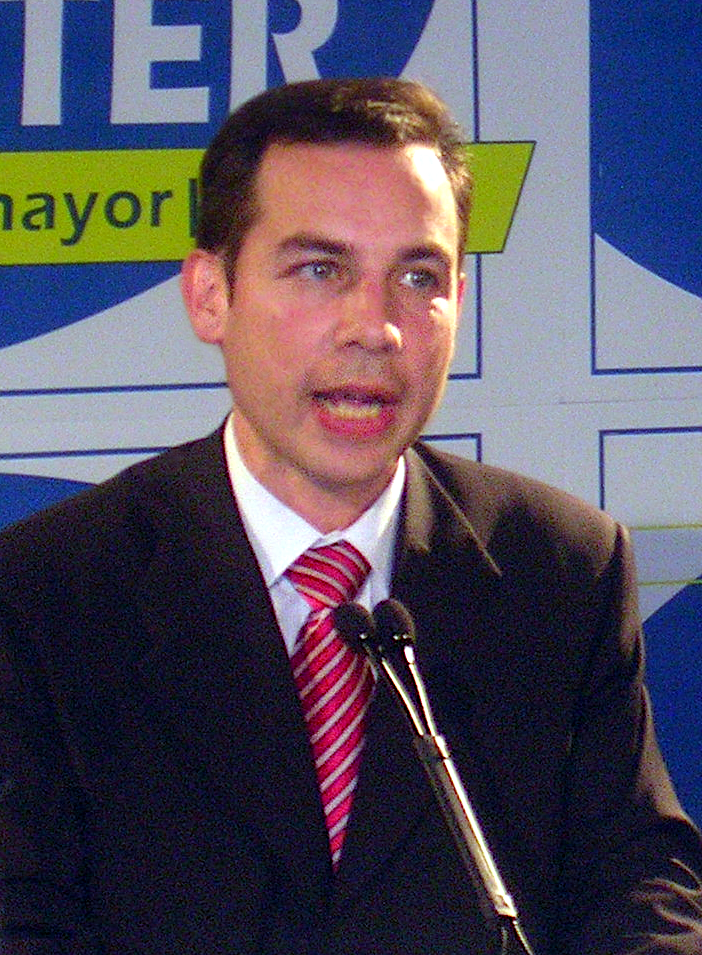

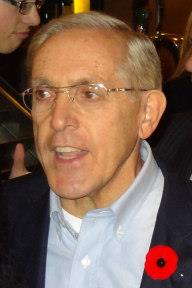
Candidate	Larry O'Brien	Alex Munter	Bob Chiarelli
Popular vote	141,262	108,752	46,697
Percentage	47.08%	36.25%	15.56%
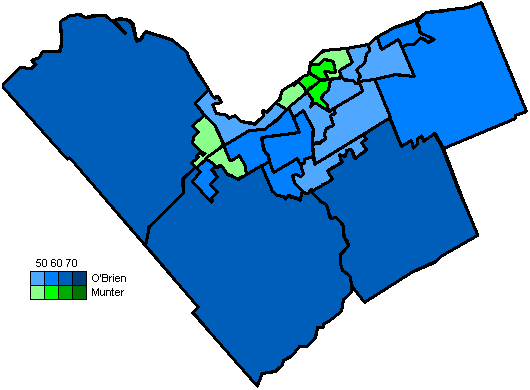
- Popular vote results by Ward
Mayor before election
Bob Chiarelli
Elected mayor
Larry O'Brien

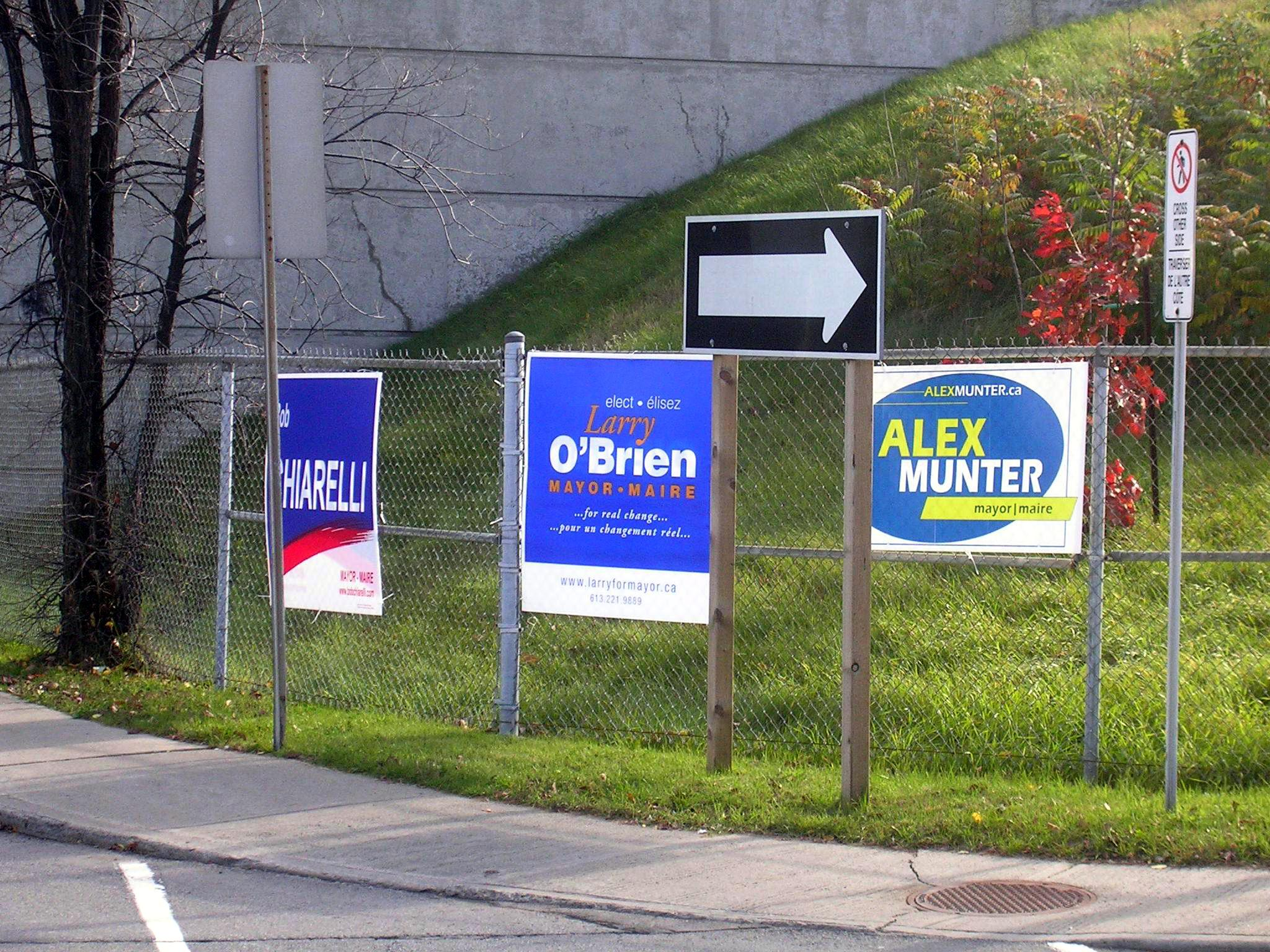
Campaign signs posted at the corner of Metcalfe Street and Catherine Street for leading mayoral candidates Bob Chiarelli, Larry O'Brien and Alex Munter.

The 2006 Ottawa municipal election was held on November 13, 2006, in Ottawa, Canada, to elect the mayor of Ottawa, Ottawa City Council and the Ottawa-Carleton Public and Catholic School Boards. The election was one of many races across the province of Ontario. See 2006 Ontario municipal elections.

The race featured three main candidates: incumbent mayor Bob Chiarelli, former Kanata councillor Alex Munter and businessman Larry O'Brien. The race began as a fight between Chiarelli and Munter, with Munter getting the edge and 2003 candidate Terry Kilrea in a close third. However, in the summer O'Brien joined the campaign, prompting Kilrea to drop out and endorse Chiarelli. However, most of Kilrea's support went to O'Brien, creating a tight three-way race. Chiarelli's support then got pulled away from the right by O'Brien and to the left by Munter and was eventually depleted, and by the last weekend before the election, O'Brien had caught up to Munter and led for the first time. This lead carried through on election day.

In the end, Munter could only win his core areas in the central part of the city, plus his former home of Kanata, while O'Brien won the rest of the city—suburban areas and the rural areas (where he did especially well). Chiarelli did not win any wards, but he did finish second in Gloucester-South Nepean with 28%. This area of the city was where his O-Train proposal was going to be built.

== Results ==
=== Voter turn-out ===
The 2006 municipal election had one of the highest voter turn-out ratios in Ottawa's history, with 54%.

=== Mayor ===
2006 Ottawa municipal election: Mayor
Party	Candidate	Votes	%	±%
Independent	Larry O'Brien	141,262	47.08	-
Independent	Alex Munter	108,752	36.25	-
Independent	Bob Chiarelli	46,697	15.56	-40.97
Independent	Jane Scharf	1,467	0.49	-
Independent	Piotr Anweiler	762	0.25	-
Independent	Robert Larter	667	0.22	-
Independent	Barkley Pollock	432	0.14	-
Total valid votes		300,039		

Detailed results
Candidate	Piotr Anweiler	Bob Chiarelli (inc.)	Robert Larter	Alex Munter	Larry O'Brien	Barkley Pollock	Jane Scharf
Residence	Carlington	Carlingwood	Vanier*	Downtown	Byward Market	Centretown	Vanier
Results by ward
Orléans	44	2325	32	6422	8928	23	78
Innes	32	1959	27	5488	6775	16	47
Barrhaven	31	2734	14	2959	6989	5	40
Kanata North	10	619	10	5036	4498	5	32
West Carleton- March	13	824	13	2716	6409	11	29
Stittsville- Kanata West	9	717	12	2814	5187	10	26
Bay	47	2949	36	5593	7458	31	117
College	49	3191	37	5672	10513	32	77
Knoxdale- Merivale	37	2345	19	3803	7720	14	46
Gloucester- Southgate	40	2685	27	3561	6310	20	68
Beacon Hill-Cyrville	36	1686	40	4301	5190	22	54
Rideau-Vanier	45	2377	71	6442	3420	31	135
Rideau- Rockcliffe	44	2333	73	5272	4495	18	87
Somerset	57	1725	47	5916	2873	23	112
Kitchissippi	44	2414	27	7149	5304	26	72
River	47	3025	37	4846	6625	28	65
Capital	47	2319	19	7056	4237	34	111
Alta Vista	36	3055	45	5319	6784	13	78
Cumberland	17	1567	24	4223	5995	23	56
Osgoode	10	1123	9	1536	6354	10	38
Rideau- Goulbourn	12	1103	10	2240	7309	12	40
Gloucester- South Nepean	22	2558	19	2008	4621	6	24
Kanata South	33	1064	19	8380	7268	19	35

* : Last known residence

=== City council ===
Orléans Ward (Ward 1)
Candidate	Votes	%
Bob Monette (X)	12201	69.98%
Dennis Vowles	5235	30.02%

Innes Ward (Ward 2)
Candidate	Votes	%
Rainer Bloess (X)	11746	83.65%
David Cameron	2296	16.35%

Barrhaven Ward (Ward 3)
Candidate	Votes	%
Jan Harder (X)	9433	74.94%
Joe King	1468	11.66%
T.K. Chu	853	6.78%
Catherine Gardner	833	6.62%

Kanata North Ward (Ward 4)
Candidate	Votes	%
Marianne Wilkinson	3661	36.23%
Jeff Seeton	2641	26.41%
Matt Muirhead	2105	20.83%
Anu Bose	1606	15.89%
Eric Forgrave	91	0.90%

West Carleton-March Ward (Ward 5)
Candidate	Votes	%
Eli El-Chantiry (X)	6683	67.13%
J. P. Dorion	3273	32.87%

Stittsville-Kanata West Ward (Ward 6)
Candidate	Votes	%
Shad Qadri	6287	72.02%
Gilles R. Chasles	2442	27.98%

Bay Ward (Ward 7)
Candidate	Votes	%
Alex Cullen (X)	8393	52.69%
Terry Kilrea	6303	39.57%
Sherril Noble	1234	7.75%

College Ward (Ward 8)
Candidate	Votes	%
Rick Chiarelli (X)	13761	72.59%
Brett Delmage	3765	19.86%
Laura Lee Doupe	1432	7.55%

Knoxdale-Merivale Ward (Ward 9)
Candidate	Votes	%
Gord Hunter (X)	10461	78.13%
James Dean	2929	21.87%

Gloucester-Southgate Ward (Ward 10)
Candidate	Votes	%
Diane Deans (X)	9242	74.73%
Douglas Besharah	1660	13.42%
David Alloggia	1465	11.85%

Beacon Hill-Cyrville Ward (Ward 11)
Candidate	Votes	%
Michel Bellemare (X)	6905	61.73%
Frank Reid	4281	38.27%

Rideau-Vanier Ward (Ward 12)
Candidate	Votes	%
Georges Bédard (X)	5685	46.72%
Bruce McConville	5482	45.06%
Krista Driscoll	1000	8.22%

Rideau-Rockcliffe Ward (Ward 13)
Candidate	Votes	%
Jacques Legendre (X)	7450	62.35%
Maurice Lamirande	1953	16.34%
James T. Parker	1248	10.44%
Jules Bouvier	1077	9.01%
Muinis Ramadan	221	1.85%

Somerset Ward (Ward 14)
Candidate	Votes	%
Diane Holmes (X)	6600	63.07%
Luc Lapointe	1782	17.03%
George Guirguis	1497	14.31%
Karen Dawe	359	3.43%
I. Ben-Tahir	226	2.16%

Kitchissippi Ward (Ward 15)
Candidate	Votes	%
Christine Leadman	5949	41.12%
Gary Ludington	4571	31.59%
Vicky Smallman	3576	24.72%
Daniel Narwa	372	2.57%

River Ward (Ward 16)
Candidate	Votes	%
Maria McRae (X)	9278	65.51%
Blake Batson	4885	34.49%

Capital Ward (Ward 17)
Candidate	Votes	%
Clive Doucet (X)	6495	48.14%
Jay Nordenstrom	4602	34.11%
Ian Boyd	1963	14.55%
Sean Curran	433	3.21%

Alta Vista Ward (Ward 18)
Candidate	Votes	%
Peter Hume (X)	10433	69.53%
James Ryan	1955	13.03%
Perry Marleau	1190	7.93%
Yusef Al Mezel	1063	7.08%
Ahmed Ibrahim	224	1.49%
Ismael Lediye	141	0.94%

Cumberland Ward (Ward 19)
Candidate	Votes	%
Rob Jellett (X)	8306	71.55%
Henry Valois	2110	18.18%
Dan Biocchi	1192	10.27%

Osgoode Ward (Ward 20)
Candidate	Votes	%
Doug Thompson (X)	7681	85.44%
Robert Fowler	1309	14.56%

Rideau-Goulbourn Ward (Ward 21)
Candidate	Votes	%
Glenn Brooks (X)	4678	44.41%
Scott Moffatt	3205	30.43%
Iain McCallum	1345	12.77%
Jim Stewart	1305	12.39%

Gloucester-South Nepean Ward (Ward 22)
Candidate	Votes	%
Steve Desroches	3599	39.72%
Andrew S. Haydon	2602	28.72%
Eric Lamoureux	1215	13.41%
Robert McKenney	449	4.96%
Tanya Thompson	1037	11.45%
Don Dransfield	158	1.74%

Kanata South Ward (Ward 23)
Candidate	Votes	%
Peggy Feltmate (X)	8344	50.05%
Allan Hubley	5631	33.78%
Amrik Dhami	1314	7.88%
Richard Rutkowski	811	4.86%
Suraj Harish	571	3.43%

==== Dropped out ====
Kitchissippi Ward (Ward 15)

- Daniel Stringer
- Shawn Little

College Ward (Ward 8)

- Dana Barnett withdrew as per her Media Release dated Sept. 6, 2006.

Kanata South (Ward 23)

- Noel Z. Gondek withdrew and on Sept. 29, 2006.

=== Ottawa-Carleton District School Board Trustees ===
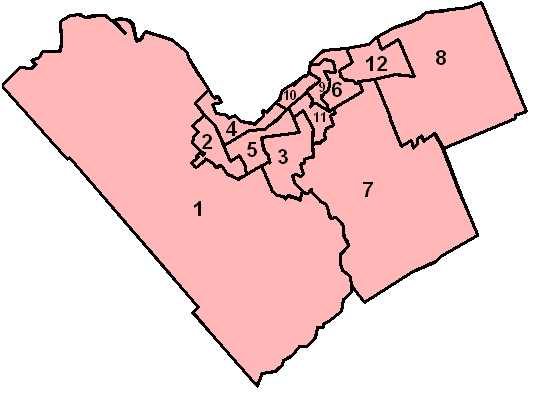

Zone 1 (Wards 5, 6, 21)
Candidate	Votes	%
Lynn Scott (X)	15299	77.28%
Jon Morgan	4499	22.72%

Zone 2 (Wards 4, 23)
Candidate	Votes	%
Cathy Curry	ACCLAIMED	

Zone 3 (Wards 3, 9)
Candidate	Votes	%
Alex Getty	12629	79.97%
Frank St. Denis	3164	20.03%

Zone 4 (Ward 7)
Candidate	Votes	%
Margaret Lange (X)	8893	84.82%
Samuel Getachew	1592	15.18%

Zone 5 (Ward 8)
Candidate	Votes	%
Pam FitzGerald	9052	76.58%
Cleve Hamilton	2769	23.42%

Zone 6 (Wards 13, 18)
Candidate	Votes	%
Bronwyn Funiciello (X)	7955	53.27%
Russ Jackson	6979	46.73%

Zone 7 (Wards 10, 20, 22)
Candidate	Votes	%
Tom Connolly	8239	47.51%
Greg Laws (X)	9102	52.49%

Zone 8 (Wards 1, 19)
Candidate	Votes	%
John Caputo	724	5.98%
David Loveridge	4536	37.49%
Qamar Masood	1054	8.71%
John Shea	5784	47.81%

Zone 9 (Wards 12, 17)
Candidate	Votes	%
Rob Campbell	ACCLAIMED	

Zone 10 (Wards 14, 15)
Candidate	Votes	%
Jennifer McKenzie	9198	54.38%
Joan Spice (X)	7716	45.62%

Zone 11 (Ward 16)
Candidate	Votes	%
Riley Brockington (X)	5617	65.75%
Patrick Ready	2926	34.25%

Zone 12 (Wards 2, 11)
Candidate	Votes	%
David Moen (X)	8453	78.03%
Michel Tardif	2380	21.97%

=== Ottawa-Carleton Catholic School Board Trustees ===
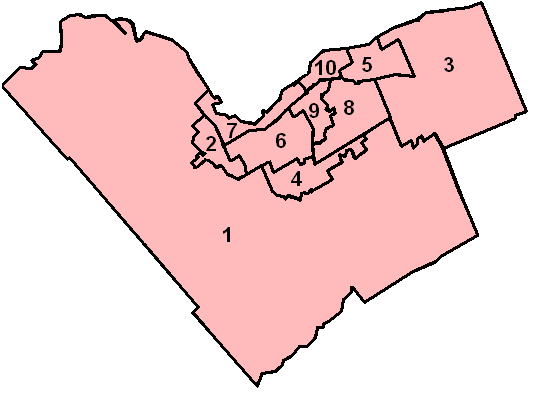

Zone 1 (Wards 5, 6, 20, 21)
Candidate	Votes	%
John Curry (X)	ACCLAIMED	

Zone 2 (Wards 4, 23)
Candidate	Votes	%
Romeo Bellai	ACCLAIMED	

Zone 3 (Wards 1, 19)
Candidate	Votes	%
Stephen Blais	3124	55.30%
Des Curley (X)	2525	44.70%

Zone 4 (Wards 3, 22)
Candidate	Votes	%
Teri-Lynne Belanger	2055	36.37%
Cathy Maguire-Urban	3596	63.63%

Zone 5 (Wards 2, 11)
Candidate	Votes	%
Dominic Roszak	1169	28.63%
Kaitlin Sheskay	2914	71.37%

Zone 6 (Wards 8, 9)
Candidate	Votes	%
Gord Butler (X)	5301	69.88%
John Chiarelli	2285	30.12%

Zone 7 (Wards 7, 15)
Candidate	Votes	%
Betty-Ann Kealey (X)	2684	56.07%
Chris Wong	1169	24.42%
Charles Yellen	934	19.51%

Zone 8 (Wards 10, 18)
Candidate	Votes	%
Mark D. Mullan (X)	ACCLAIMED	

Zone 9 (Wards 16, 17)
Candidate	Votes	%
Kathy Ablett (X)	3213	66.41%
Patrycja Anweiler	583	12.05%
Su Choi Broussard	1042	21.54%

Zone 10 (Wards 12, 13, 14)
Candidate	Votes	%
Thérèse Maloney Cousineau (X)	ACCLAIMED	

=== Conseil des écoles catholiques de langue française du Centre-Est Trustees ===
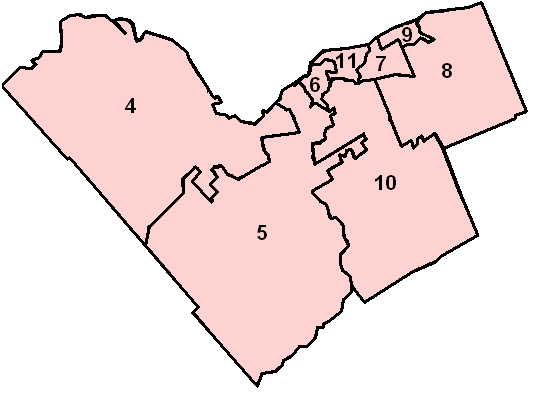

Zone 4 (Wards 4, 5, 6, 7, 8, 23)
Candidate	Votes	%
Marie Biron (X)	ACCLAIMED	

Zone 5 (Wards 3, 9, 15, 16, 21, 22)
Candidate	Votes	%
Jacques Duplain	879	31.92%
Andrée Newell	1147	41.65%
Denis Vermeirre	728	26.43%

Zone 6 (Wards 12, 14, 17)
Candidate	Votes	%
Diane Doré (X)	ACCLAIMED	

Zone 7 (Ward 2)
Candidate	Votes	%
Monique Briand (X)	ACCLAIMED	

Zone 8 (Ward 19)
Candidate	Votes	%
Dan Boudria	1327	38.82%
Lise Cloutier (X)	1195	34.96%
Benoît Chiquette	896	26.21%

Zone 9 (Ward 1)
Candidate	Votes	%
Madelaine Chevalier (X)	ACCLAIMED	

Zone 10 (Wards 10, 18, 20)
Candidate	Votes	%
Patrick Boucher	1030	32.29%
Robert Tremblay (X)	2160	67.71%

Zone 11 (Wards 11, 13)
Candidate	Votes	%
Brian Beauchamp (X)	2159	38.82%
Donna Martin	983	17.67%
Denis Poirier	2420	43.51%

=== Conseil des écoles publiques de l'Est de l'Ontario Trustees ===
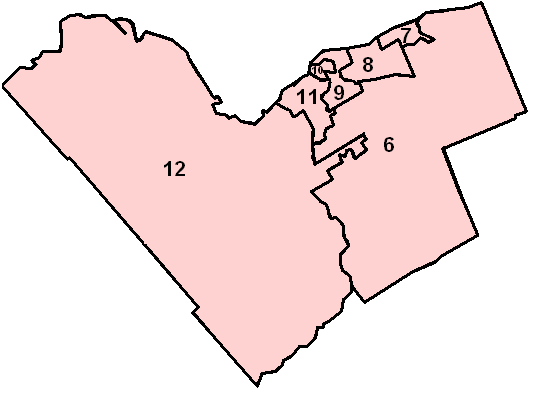

Zone 6 (Wards 10, 19, 20)
Candidate	Votes	%
Georges Orfali	ACCLAIMED	

Zone 7 (Ward 1)
Candidate	Votes	%
Pierre Maheu (X)	ACCLAIMED	

Zone 8 (Wards 2, 11)
Candidate	Votes	%
Chantal Lecours (X)	1313	65.52%
Fayek Tabet	85	4.24%
Pierre Tessier	606	30.24%

Zone 9 (Wards 13, 18)
Candidate	Votes	%
Marielle Godbout (X)	1236	85.71%
Dorcase Saintil	206	14.29%

Zone 10 (Ward 12)
Candidate	Votes	%
Denis Chartrand	943	58.57%
Abdi Aden Chil (X)	313	19.44%
Osman Daher	83	5.16%
Alexandra Samson	271	16.83%

Zone 11 (Wards 14-17)
Candidate	Votes	%
Jean-Paul Lafond (X)	ACCLAIMED	

Zone 12 (Wards 3-9, 21-23)
Candidate	Votes	%
Bernard Bareilhe (X)	ACCLAIMED	

== Candidates for mayor ==
=== Registered candidates ===
Piotr Anweiler: Local businessman. President of AplusB Software Corporation.

Bob Chiarelli: Incumbent mayor, has been mayor of Ottawa since 2001, and was regional chair of the Regional Municipality of Ottawa-Carleton prior. He is also a former Liberal Member of Provincial Parliament.

Robert Larter: Unknown candidate. The Ottawa Citizen reported his registered phone number was traceable to an apartment in Vanier, from where he moved away during the summer. The Citizen was unable to contact him.

Alex Munter: Former city councillor in Kanata (1991–1994), regional councillor (1994–2000) and former Ottawa city councillor (2000–2003). Ran for the Ontario New Democratic Party in Carleton in the 1990 election. Openly gay, Munter was also the co-ordinator for Canadians for Equal Marriage.

Larry O'Brien: Chairman and former CEO of Calian Technologies Ltd., an Ottawa-based company that sells technology services to industry and government.

Barkley Pollock: Twenty-seven-year-old wants to look at the possibility of a municipal income tax to increase money for the poor. Campaigned for Liberal Richard Mahoney in Ottawa Centre in the 2004 and 2006 federal elections.

Jane Scharf: Local poverty activist. She has been arrested more than once including an arrest during the Homeless Action Strike on City Hall. All charges were dropped.

=== Dropped out ===
Don Rivington: A single-issue candidate who wants an ombudsman for the city. Ran for city council in the 2003 election in Bay Ward but lost. Dropped out of the Orléans Ward by-election in 2006.

Terry Kilrea: Placed second in the 2003 election. Kilrea is generally regarded as a conservative. He ran for the Conservative Party of Canada's nomination race in Ottawa South in the 2004 election but lost. Withdrew on August 30, 2006 and will endorse Chiarelli. Will run as councillor candidate in Bay Ward against Alex Cullen.

=== Not running ===
- Diane Deans, city councillor. running for re-election in Gloucester-Southgate Ward
- Jan Harder, city councillor. running for re-election in Barrhaven Ward
- Brian McGarry, CEO of Hulse, Playfair & McGarry funeral homes.

== Poll results ==
Polling Firm	Polling Dates	Link	Bob Chiarelli	Alex Munter	Larry O'Brien	Terry Kilrea (dropped out)	other/non-runners	undecided and/or not voting	MOE +/−
Decima	7–9 November 2006		11%	32%	37%	—	?	?	2.85% (19/20)
UniMarketing	2–7 November 2006		20%	34%	25%	—	1%	20%	4% (19/20)
Strategic Counsel	1–4 November 2006		17%	29%	27%	—	2%	25%	4.4% (19/20)
Holinshed	31 October - 1 November 2006		22%	28%	24%	—	—	19%	5% (19/20)
UniMarketing	13 October 2006 - 18 October 2006		23%	31%	21%	—	1%†^{2}	24%	3.6% (19/20)
Holinshed	14 October 2006 – 15 October 2006		21%	30%	26%	—	2%†^{2}	21%	4.13% (19/20)
Leger Marketing	29 September 2006 – 8 October 2006		32%^	37%^	31%^	—	—	17%	4.0% (19/20)
Holinshed	25 September 2006 – 27 September 2006		28.1%	27.5%	22.3%	—	?	?	4.6% (?/?)
Decima	18 September 2006 – 25 September 2006		24%	25%	20%	—	—	31%	4.9% (19/20)
Holinshed	1 September 2006 *		22.5%	24.2%	18%	—	?	?	?
Holinshed	28 July 2006 *		20%	25%	6.8%	14%	~3%†	29%	?
Decima	23 June 2006 – 26 June 2006		20%	22%	—	12%	~3%†	46%	4.9% (19/20)
Decima	24 February 2006 – 4 March 2006		20%	27%	—	14%	1%	38%	4.9% (19/20)
Decima	30 April 2005 *	^{1}	27%^	28%^	—	14%^	31%^	?	?

? indicates statistic not stated/unknown
— indicates candidate's name not included in polling question
* indicates poll release date - actual polling date(s) unknown
^ indicates percentage of decided voters only
†^{2} indicates percentage of votes for Piotr Anweiller, Robert Larter, Barkley Pollock and Jane Scharf
† indicates percentage of votes for Piotr Anweiller, Barkley Pollock and Jane Scharf
^{1} Source: Ottawa Sun, 30 April 2005

== Endorsements ==
=== Bob Chiarelli ===
- Jean-Jacques Blais, former MP
- Marlene Catterall, former MP
- Guy Cousineau, former mayor of Vanier
- Clive Doucet, city councillor
- Jim Durrell, former mayor
- Lee Farnworth, former Nepean city councillor
- Brian Ford, former police chief
- Bernard Grandmaître, former mayor of Vanier
- Mac Harb, Senator
- Jan Harder, city councillor
- Terry Kilrea, former mayoral candidate
- David McGuinty, MP
- Maria McRae, city councillor
- Bob Monette, city councillor
- Jim Watson, MPP
- Ottawa Sun
- Ottawa Citizen

=== Alex Munter ===
- Norm Atkins, Senator
- Mauril Bélanger, MP
- Ed Broadbent, former leader of the NDP
- Claudette Boyer, former MPP
- Michael Cassidy, former leader of the Ontario NDP
- Alex Cullen, city councillor
- Marion Dewar, former mayor
- Paul Dewar, MP
- Peggy Feltmate, city councillor
- John Godfrey, MP
- Diane Holmes, city councillor
- John Manley, former MP
- Monia Mazigh, former NDP candidate, wife of Maher Arar
- Simon Pulsifer, prolific Wikipedian
- Janet Stavinga, outgoing city councillor
- Pat Woodcock, professional football player
- Le Droit
- Ottawa Life

=== Larry O'Brien ===
- Piotr Anweiler, mayoral candidate
- Glenn Brooks, city councillor
- Art Eggleton, former MP
- Jacquelin Holzman, former mayor
- Gord Hunter, city councillor
- Merle Nicholds, former mayor of Kanata
- Gordon O'Connor, MP
- Pierre Poilievre, MP
- Tim Power, Conservative Party strategist
- Marianne Wilkinson, former mayor of Kanata

=== Jane Scharf ===
- John Dunn, Executive Director, The Foster Care Council of Canada

== Timeline ==
- June 21, 2005 - Brian McGarry announces he will not run for mayor, as he fears the right-wing vote would be split with Terry Kilrea. ottsun.canoe.ca
- September 9, 2005 - Orléans Ward Councillor Herb Kreling resigns his seat to become Justice of the Peace. orleansonline.ca
- October 7, 2005 - the Ontario Municipal Board rules in favour of the new ward boundary proposal that was being fought by mostly rural residents. ottawasun.com
- January 3, 2006 - First day of nominations. Chiarelli, Kilrea and Rivington file nomination papers for mayor.
- January 9, 2006 - Bob Monette is elected in the by-election to replace Herb Kreling.
- February 13, 2006 - Munter declares his intention to run for mayor. cbc.ca
- April 11, 2006 - City Councillor Janet Stavinga announces she will not be running for re-election. janetstavinga.com
- May 2, 2006 - Pollock declares his intention to run for mayor. cfra.com
- June 1, 2006 - Anweiler declares his intention to run for mayor. anweiler.ca
- June 13, 2006 - Gloucester-Southgate Councillor Diane Deans declares that she will not run for mayor and instead decided to run for re-election. (Ottawa Citizen, June 14)
- July 26, 2006 - High-tech businessman Larry O'Brien announces his intention to run for the mayoralty as a "centrist candidate," planning to file his nomination papers within a few weeks. cbc.ca
- August 8, 2006 - O'Brien fills out nomination papers.
- August 30, 2006 - Kilrea drops out of the race.
- September 12, 2006 - First mayoral debate
- September 13, 2006 - Councillor Shawn Little drops out of his city council race
- September 14, 2006 - Election signs can legally be put up.
- September 28, 2006 - Robert Larter files his nomination papers.
- September 29, 2006 - Nominations close.
- October 10, 2006 - John Baird, president of the federal Treasury Board, announced that the 200M$ promised from the federal government for the O-Train project would not be given until the new elected council approves the project.
- October 23, 2006 - A-Channel debate.
- November 13, 2006 - Election day.
  - 8:00PM - Polls close.
  - 8:30PM - A-Channel recognizes Larry O'Brien as the new Mayor of the City of Ottawa
  - 8:50PM - Bob Chiarelli arrives at Larry O'Brien's campaign headquarters, and officially names Larry O'Brien as new Mayor of the City of Ottawa

== Issues ==
- Bilingualism in Ottawa
- Budget difficulties
- Amalgamation
- Homelessness
- Pesticide Bylaw ottawa.ca
- Public transportation, LRT and in particular O-Train expansion controversies
- Rising property taxes
- Safety issues
- Taxes
- Ward boundary changes

== Ward boundary changes ==
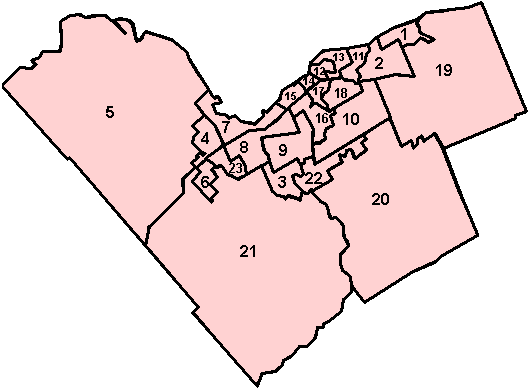
New ward boundaries

New ward boundaries were drawn for the 2006 election. Under the new plan, the size of city council will be increased by two members. The boundary commission made the following proposal that was adopted by city council:

- Orléans Ward 1
- Innes Ward 2
- Barrhaven Ward 3 (drastically decreased in size, formerly Bell-South Nepean Ward.)
- Kanata North Ward 4 (formerly Kanata Ward)
- West Carleton Ward 5 (added rural parts from Kanata)
- Stittsville-Kanata West Ward 6 (New ward, formerly Goulbourn Ward)
- Bay Ward 7
- College Ward 8 (Formerly Baseline Ward. Added neighbourhoods of Bells Corners and Crestview)
- Knoxdale-Merivale Ward 9 (added suburbs south of Hunt Club Road)
- Gloucester-Southgate Ward 10 (made significantly smaller. Includes now only Hunt Club and Blossom Park)
- Beacon Hill-Cyrville Ward 11
- Rideau-Vanier Ward 12
- Rideau-Rockcliffe Ward 13
- Somerset Ward 14
- Kitchissippi Ward 15
- River Ward 16 (losses Macdonald-Cartier airport and Ellwood)
- Capital Ward 17
- Alta Vista Ward 18
- Cumberland Ward 19 (added rural parts from Gloucester)
- Osgoode Ward 20 (added rural parts from Gloucester)
- Rideau-Goulbourn Ward 21 (amalgamation of Rideau Ward and Goulbourn Ward. Added rural parts from Nepean, lost Stittsville)
- Gloucester-South Nepean Ward 22 (New) (created from parts of Bell-South Nepean and Gloucester-Southgate.)
- Kanata South Ward 23 (New) (created from south part of Kanata ward.)
