= 1980 Ottawa-Carleton Regional Municipality elections =

Elections were held on November 10, 1980 in the Regional Municipality of Ottawa-Carleton. This page lists the election results for local mayors, reeves and councils of the RMOC in 1980.

== Cumberland ==
Reeve race

Candidate	Vote	%
Peter Clark	2,119	51.71
Henri Rocque (X)	1,979	48.29

Council
Four to be elected

Candidate	Vote	%
Don Boudria (X)	2,716	21.53
Ray Friel (X)	2,263	17.94
Paul Macdonnell (X)	1,993	15.80
Frank Kenny (X)	1,932	15.31
Patricia Wright	1,743	13.81
Ray Rivers	1,079	8.55
Ted Hansen	891	7.06

== Gloucester ==
Reeve race

Betty Stewart was re-elected After a judicial recount conducted December 9–10. Election night results showed her opponent, Fred Barrett ahead as did a recount conducted on November 16.

Candidate	Vote	%
Betty Stewart (X)	5,361	47.04
Fred Barrett	5,345	46.90
Keith Sennett	690	6.05

Council
Six to be elected; top two to sit on regional council

Candidate	Vote	%
Harry Allen (X)	7,282	14.25
Eugène Bellemare (X)	6,626	12.97
Mitch Owens	6,620	12.96
Ken Steele	5,372	10.51
Harold Keenan (X)	5,282	10.34
Mary Bryden (X)	4,803	9.40
Pat Clark	4,279	8.37
Brad Kennedy	3,076	6.02
Jean Gregoire	3,033	5.94
Leola Davignon	2,414	4.72
Nicole Poudrette	2,309	4.52

== Goulbourn ==
Mayoral race

Candidate	Vote	%
Betty Hill (X)	1,825	50.95
Anton Wytenburg	1,757	49.05

Council

Candidate	Vote	%
Ward 1
Gilmour Brown (X)	Acclaimed	
Ward 2
Bob Fredericks (X)	Acclaimed	
Ward 3
Don Green (X)	Acclaimed	
Ward 4
Dewar Burnett (X)	526	54.06
Michael Bryan	447	45.94

== Kanata ==
Mayoral race

Candidate	Vote	%
Marianne Wilkinson (X)	4,132	72.39
George St. Aubin	1,576	27.61

Council

Candidate	Vote	%
Ward 1
Des Adam	384	61.74
Dan Perley	238	38.26
Ward 2
Bob Kingham (X)	Acclaimed	
Ward 3
Bill Lund (X)	Acclaimed	
Ward 4
Doug Nash (X)	Acclaimed	
Ward 5
Charles Rogers (X)	Acclaimed	
Ward 6
Jean Gabby (X)	735	57.38
Stuart Chandler	546	42.62

== Nepean ==
Mayoral race (216 of 218 polls)

Candidate	Vote	%
Ben Franklin (X)	15,351	84.88
Harry Splett	2,735	15.12

Council

Candidate	Vote	%
Regional council 3 to be elected
Margaret Rywak (X)	11,755	27.18
Beryl Gaffney	11,590	26.80
Gord Hunter	10,302	23.82
Norman Cookley	9,595	22.19
City council 3 to be elected
Al Brown (X)	9,774	22.64
Hugh McDonald (X)	8,975	20.79
Frank Reid	8,443	19.56
Marcy Gregory	5,540	12.83
Terry Bell	4,782	11.08
Victoria Mason	4,316	10.00
Al Jeans	1,340	3.10

Nepean voters also voted to legalize wine stores in the city.

== Osgoode ==
Reeve race

Candidate	Vote	%
Albert Bouwers (X)	Acclaimed	

Council
4 to be elected

Candidate	Vote	%
Albert McKeown (X)	Acclaimed	
Mary Cooper (X)	Acclaimed	
Fred Alexander (X)	Acclaimed	
Doug Thompson	Acclaimed	

== Ottawa ==
Mayor race

Candidate	Votes	%
Marion Dewar (X)	49,687	57.03
Pat Nicol	33,151	38.05
Alphonse Frederick Lapointe	2,357	2.71
John Turmel	1,928	2.21

== Rideau ==
Reeve race

Candidate	Vote	%
Dave Bartlett (X)	Acclaimed	

Council

Candidate	Vote	%
Ward 1; 2 to be elected
Glenn Brooks	905	44.56
Bill Schouten (X)	673	33.15
William Warren	233	11.47
Don Ayres	220	10.83
Ward 2; 2 to be elected
Joyce Bigley (X)	Acclaimed	
John Wilson (X)	Acclaimed	
Ward 3; 2 to be elected
Richard McDonald (X)	Acclaimed	
Dorothy Bickerton (X)	Acclaimed	

== Rockcliffe Park ==
Reeve race

Candidate	Vote	%
Beryl Plumptre (X)	Acclaimed	

Council
4 to be elected

Candidate	Vote	%
A. G. Sandy Watson (X)	Acclaimed	
Patrick Murray (X)	Acclaimed	
Anthony Keith (X)	Acclaimed	
David Jenkins (X)	Acclaimed	

== Vanier ==
Mayoral race

Candidate	Vote	%
Wilfrid Champagne	3,065	50.75
Paul St. George	2,054	34.01
Wilbrod Cormier	921	15.25

Council

Candidate	Vote	%
Ward 1; 2 to be elected
Richard Boudreau	507	31.67
Marcel Champagne	479	29.92
Denis Neider	288	17.99
Gerald Gagné	123	7.68
Robert Gemus	107	6.68
Paul Tomaro	97	6.06
Ward 2; 2 to be elected
Marcel Chaput (X)	1,150	38.23
Ronald Killeen (X)	959	31.88
Yvette Bigras	364	12.10
Hector Jamieson	330	10.97
Jacques Drouin	205	6.82
Ward 3; 2 to be elected
Gilles Barbary	790	33.73
Robert Madore (X)	694	29.63
Charles Beriault	435	18.57
Claude Robillard	423	18.06
Ward 4; 2 to be elected
Guy Cousineau (X)	818	37.18
Florian Gauthier (X)	677	30.77
Gerald Beausejour	629	28.59
Raphael Pilon	76	3.45

== West Carleton ==
Mayoral race

Candidate	Vote	%
Frank Marchington (X)	2,532	60.01
Don Munro	1,687	39.99

Council

Candidate	Vote	%
Torbolton Ward; 2 to be elected
Betty Smith (X)	948	42.80
Delmer Wilson	750	33.86
Andrew Baldwin	517	23.34
Fitzroy Ward; 2 to be elected
Bert Reitsman (X)	663	30.10
Eric Greene	576	26.16
Eric Craig	496	22.51
Ambrose Holmes	468	21.24
Huntley Ward; 2 to be elected
Ivan Baird (X)	946	37.20
Gerald Belisle (X)	934	36.73
Don Irwin	663	26.07
