= Beaverbrook, Ottawa =

Beaverbrook
- Neighbourhood
- Location in Ottawa
- Coordinates: 45°19′34″N 75°54′05″W
- Country: Canada
- Province: Ontario
- City: Ottawa
- Community: Kanata
- Founded: early 1960s
- Incorporated: 1978 (Kanata)
- Amalgamated: 2001 (City of Ottawa)

Government
  - Mayor: Mark Sutcliffe
  - MPs: Jenna Sudds
  - MPPs: Karen McCrimmon
  - Councillors: Cathy Curry

Area
  - Total: 2.59 km^{2} (1.00 sq mi)

Population (2011)
  - Total: 5,182
  - Density: 2,000/km^{2} (5,180/sq mi)
- Time zone: UTC−5 (Eastern (EST))
  - Summer (DST): UTC−4 (EDT)

Beaverbrook is a suburban neighbourhood in Kanata North Ward in the city of Ottawa, Ontario, Canada. It is located within the former city of Kanata. Beaverbrook is known for its hedged houses and community facilities. The neighbourhood is bounded by the Kanata North Business Park to the north, March Road to the east, Campeau Drive to the south and Knudson Avenue & Weslock Way to the west.

According to the Canada 2011 Census, the total population of the neighbourhood was 5,182.

== History ==
Originally known as Kanata, Beaverbrook is the first and oldest residential neighbourhood in Kanata. The area was an agricultural part of March Township until the 1960s when developer and planner Bill Teron set about creating a planned Garden City community. The first street to be developed was Tiffany Crescent in 1964. John Mlacak, who was the reeve of March Township from 1968 to 1976, helped lead the development of Kanata during the 1970s, 1980s and onward. The city centre didn't grow as he had originally planned, but eventually with its residences, hi-tech businesses, and commercial services, in 1978 it was incorporated as the new City of Kanata, which was named after the neighbourhood after a referendum. Beaverbrook is named after Max Aitken, Lord Beaverbrook.

== Schools ==
- Earl of March Secondary School
- Stephen Leacock Public School
- W. Erskine Johnston Public School
- Roland Michener Public School
- Georges Vanier Catholic School

== Notable residents ==
- Terry Matthews KBE FIEE FREng (hc) (born 1943) – entrepreneur, chairman of Mitel
- Trevor Matthews - Founder & CEO, Brookstreet Pictures
- Marianne Wilkinson - Past Mayor and City Councillor of Kanata North
