= Alex Munter =

Canadian politician and journalist (born 1968)

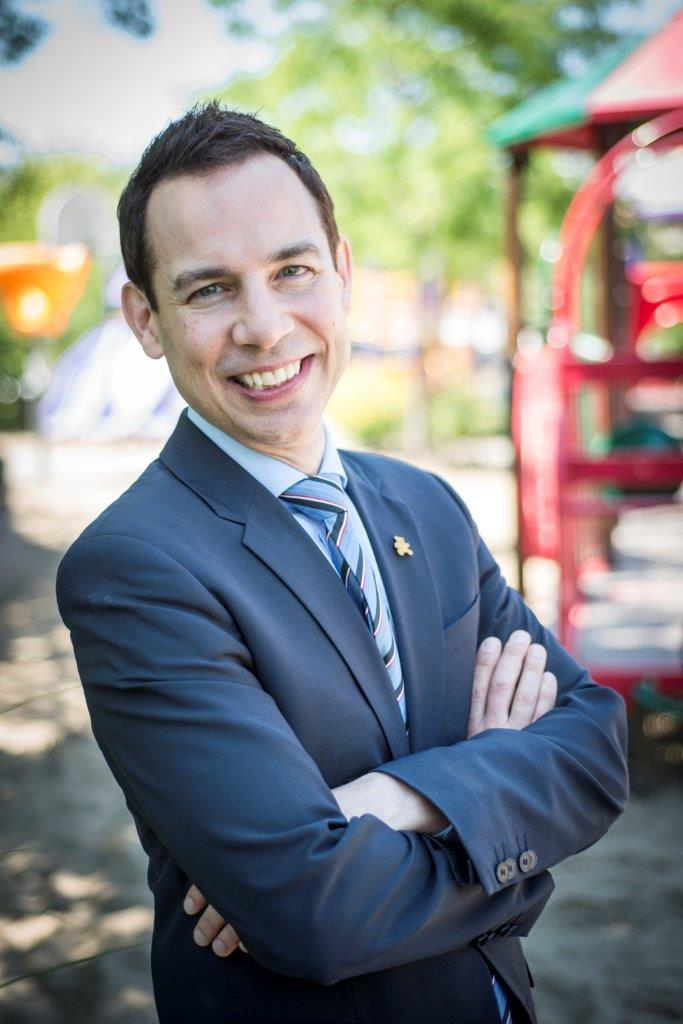

Kanata City Councillor
- In office 1991–1994
- Preceded by: Bev Read
- Succeeded by: Tom Flood
- Constituency: Katimavik-Hazeldean Ward

Ottawa-Carleton Regional Councillor
- In office 1994–2000
- Preceded by: Merle Nicholds
- Succeeded by: position abolished
- Constituency: Kanata Ward

Ottawa City Councillor
- In office 2001–2003
- Preceded by: Position created
- Succeeded by: Peggy Feltmate
- Constituency: Kanata Ward

Personal details
- Born: Alexander Mathias Munter; April 29, 1968 (age 58) Montreal, Quebec, Canada

Alexander Mathias Munter (born April 29, 1968) is a Canadian health-care executive, business owner, and former politician in Ottawa, Ontario, Canada. He served as president and chief executive officer (CEO) of the Children's Hospital of Eastern Ontario (CHEO), and as of 2025 is the head of the Canadian Medical Association.

== Early life and education ==
Munter was born in Montreal and later moved with his family to the Ottawa region in 1977. His father emigrated from Germany and his mother from Egypt. At age 14, he published the Kanata Kourier, a monthly local paper, while still in high school. He holds a Bachelor of Social Sciences from the University of Ottawa, a master of Science in Behavioural Science from the London School of Economics, and is a Certified Health Executive (CHE) from the Canadian College of Health Leaders.

=== Political career ===
In 1990, Munter ran as a candidate for the Ontario New Democratic Party in the provincial riding of Carleton, placing third.

In 1991, he was elected to Kanata City Council, and from 1994 to 2000 he served on the Regional Municipality of Ottawa-Carleton representing Kanata (incumbent Bev Read). He served as a City and Regional Councillor in Ottawa from 1991 to 2003. During his municipal tenure, he chaired committees responsible for health and social services. He is noted for being the National Capital Region's first openly gay politician, having publicly come out in 1993.

=== 2006 mayoral campaign ===
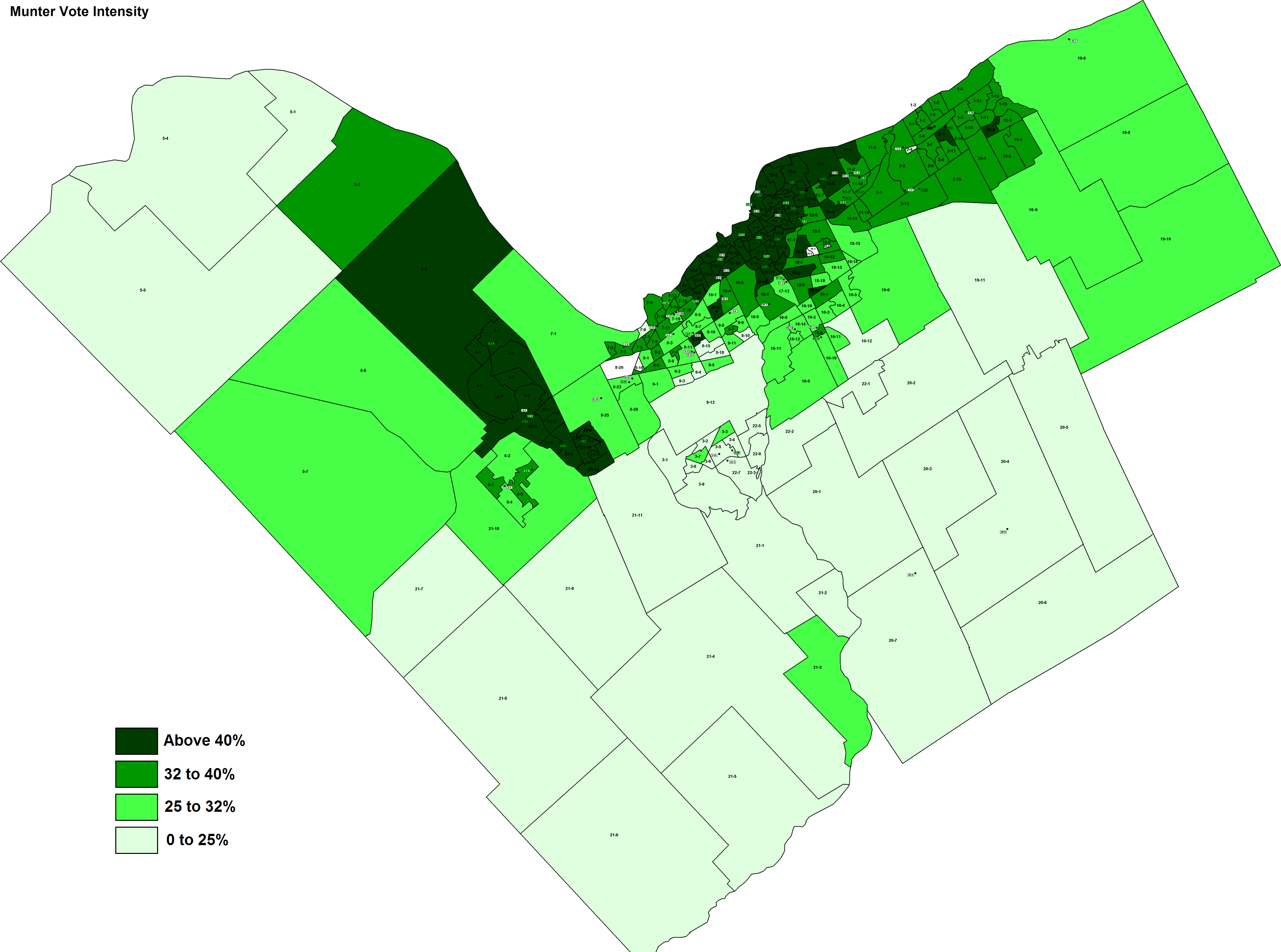
A map showing the concentration of Munter's vote. He won the downtown and his home region of Kanata while doing poorly in the rural areas

Munter announced his candidacy for Mayor of Ottawa in February 2006. Early polling indicated a lead for Munter over incumbent Bob Chiarelli and other candidate Larry O’Brien, yet in the November election Munter finished second with 36.25% to O'Brien’s 47%

=== Career in health and social services ===
After stepping back from electoral politics, Munter moved into leadership roles in the not-for-profit health sector. He was executive director of the Youth Services Bureau (YSB) from 2007 to 2011 and served as president and chief executive officer of CHEO from 2011 until 2024. Under his leadership, CHEO undertook service integration and children-and-youth health initiatives.

In December 2024, Munter left CHEO to join the Canada Medical Association as chief executive officer.

== Healthcare advocacy ==
In 2012 and 2013, Munter co-chaired the Ontario Healthy Kids Panel, which produced recommendations on early childhood health, food environments, and communities.

Munter has advocated for better access to mental health care and the adoption of new technologies within Canadian hospitals, and has spoken on the future of Canada's universal medicare system.

=== Advocacy for LGBTQ+ rights ===
In 1994, Munter led the Ottawa branch of Campaign for Equal Families, a grassroots coalition to support the Ontario government’s same-sex spousal legislation.

He served as National Co-ordinator for Canadians for Equal Marriage, a group that campaigned supporting the federal legalization of same-sex marriage in Canada.

Munter was Grand Marshall of the Capital Pride Parade three times in recognition of his leadership in the LGBTQ+ community, in 1993, 2003 and 2013.Munter has spoken out against homophobia throughout his political career. Media reported on incidents where his campaign signs were defaced, and he received hostile anti-gay emails. In 2022, he spoke publicly about being the target of homophobic slurs while walking his son to daycare.

=== Boycott of Capital Pride 2024 ===
In August 2024, Munter announced that CHEO would not participate in Capital Pride events that year. The decision followed a public statement by Capital Pride expressing solidarity with Palestine, and advocating for Boycott, Divestment and Sanctions, in addition to condemning the October 7 attacks on Israel and rising anti-semitism and Islamophobia. Munter stated that some community members no longer felt safe or welcome to attend the event due to that statement." Capital Pride co-chair Francesco MacAllister-Caruso responded by emphasizing that the organization’s mission is based on equity, justice, and inclusion, and that it aims to foster important conversations on challenging topics."

== Awards and Recognition ==
Munter has received awards from several organizations for public service and communication, including the King Charles III Coronation Medal (2025) and the Prix de la francophonie de l'Ontario (2012).

He has been recognized by the International Association of Business Communicators (IABC) – Ottawa chapter; the Rotary Club of West Ottawa, and Children’s Healthcare Canada. He also won the Capital Xtra Hero Award.

== Personal life ==
Munter lives in Ottawa. He has spoken about living in a multi-generational home with his spouse, son, parents and father-in-law. He has been open about his sexuality since 1993 and has spoken publicly on issues related to inclusion and equality.

== Electoral record ==
2006 Ottawa municipal election: Mayor
Party	Candidate	Votes	%	±%
Independent	Larry O'Brien	141,262	47.08	-
Independent	Alex Munter	108,752	36.25	-
Independent	Bob Chiarelli	46,697	15.56	-40.97
Independent	Jane Scharf	1,467	0.49	-
Independent	Piotr Anweiler	762	0.25	-
Independent	Robert Larter	667	0.22	-
Independent	Barkley Pollock	432	0.14	-
Total valid votes		300,039		

2000 Ottawa Municipal Election: Kanata Ward
Candidate	Votes	%
Alex Munter	Acclaimed	

1997 Ottawa-Carleton Regional Municipality Elections: Kanata Ward
Candidate	Votes	%
Alex Munter	Acclaimed	

1994 Ottawa-Carleton Regional Municipality Elections: Kanata Ward
Candidate	Votes	%
Alex Munter	6,572	45.34
Mark Gallivan	4,546	31.36
Marianne Wilkinson	3,376	23.29

1991 Ottawa-Carleton Regional Municipality Elections: Kanata City Council: Katimavik-Hazeldean Ward	Vote	%
Alex Munter	2,466	71.42
Bev Read	565	16.36
Derek Foster	422	12.22

1990 Ontario general election: Carleton
Party	Candidate	Votes	%	±%
Progressive Conservative	Norman Sterling	17,860	46.91	
Liberal	Susan Lebrun	10,143	26.64	
New Democratic	Alex Munter	10,071	26.45	
Total valid votes		38,074	98.89	
Total rejected, unmarked and declined ballots		427	1.11	
Turnout		38,501	65.15	
Eligible voters		59,098		

Preceded by Bev Read	Kanata city councillors from Katimavik-Hazeldean; 1991–1994	Succeeded by Tom Flood
Preceded by Merle Nicholds (as mayor of Kanata)	Regional councillors from Kanata Ward; 1994–2000	Succeeded by None, regional council abolished
Preceded by None, ward amalgamated into Ottawa in 2000	Ottawa city councillors from Kanata Ward; 2000–2003	Succeeded by Peggy Feltmate

Business positions
Preceded by Michel Bilodeau	CEO of CHEO; 2011–2024	Succeeded by Vera Etches
