= Kanata (electoral district) =

Federal electoral district in Ontario, Canada

Ontario electoral district
- Interactive map of riding boundaries from the 2025 federal election

Federal electoral district
- Legislature: House of Commons
MP
Jenna Sudds
Liberal
- District created: 2023
- First contested: 2025
- District webpage: profile, map

Demographics
- Population (2021): 121,458
- Area (km²): 232.5
- Pop. density (per km²): 522.4
- Census division: Ottawa
- Census subdivision: Ottawa (part)

Kanata is a new federal electoral district in Ontario, Canada.

== Geography ==
Under the 2022 Canadian federal electoral redistribution the riding was formed largely from the more urban eastern portion of Kanata—Carleton.

- Gained Bells Corners from Nepean; Gained Shirleys Bay area from Ottawa West—Nepean
- Gained area north of Hazeldean Road from Carleton.
- Lost all territory west of the 417 and north of Craig's Side Road / Murphy Side Road / Constance Lake Road / Berry Side Road, and south of Hazeldean Road and west of Terry Fox Drive to Carleton.

== Demographics ==
According to the 2021 Canadian census

Languages: 67.9% English, 8.3% French, 4.8% Mandarin, 2.9% Arabic, 1.6% Russian, 1.3% Spanish, 1.3% Cantonese

Religions: 50.0% Christian (25.9% Catholic, 4.9% Anglican, 4.0% United Church, 2.1% Christian Orthodox, 1.1% Presbyterian, 11.9% Other), 34.8% No religion, 8.6% Muslim, 2.9% Hindu, 1.4% Buddhist

Median income: $54,000 (2020)

Average income: $64,300 (2020)

Panethnic groups in Kanata (2021)
Panethnic group	2021	
Panethnic group	Pop.	%
European (Note: Statistic includes all persons that did not make up part of a visible minority or an indigenous identity.)	77,780	64.88%
East Asian (Note: Statistic includes total responses of "Chinese", "Korean", and "Japanese" under visible minority section on census.)	10,895	9.09%
South Asian	9,250	7.72%
Middle Eastern (Note: Statistic includes total responses of "West Asian" and "Arab" under visible minority section on census.)	6,880	5.74%
African	5,220	4.35%
Southeast Asian (Note: Statistic includes total responses of "Filipino" and "Southeast Asian" under visible minority section on census.)	4,000	3.34%
Indigenous	2,635	2.2%
Latin American	1,580	1.32%
Other/multiracial (Note: Statistic includes total responses of "Visible minority, n.i.e." and "Multiple visible minorities" under visible minority section on census.)	1,635	1.36%
Total responses	119,890	98.62%
Total population	121,565	100%
Notes: Totals greater than 100% due to multiple origin responses. Demographics based on 2022 Canadian federal electoral redistribution riding boundaries.

== History ==
Parliament	Years	Member	Party
Kanata; Riding created from Carleton, Kanata—Carleton, Nepean, and Ottawa West—Nepean
45th	2025–present	Jenna Sudds	Liberal

== Election results ==
2025 Canadian federal election
Party	Candidate	Votes	%	±%	Expenditures
Liberal	Jenna Sudds	45,244	60.8	+17.56	
Conservative	Greg Kung	26,557	35.7	–1.21	
New Democratic	Melissa Simon	1,702	2.3	–12.38	
Green	Jennifer Purdy	835	1.1	–1.37	
Centrist	Moinuddin Siddiqui	122	0.2	N/A	
Total valid votes/expense limit		74,460	99.4		
Total rejected ballots		457	0.6		
Turnout		74,917	78.7		
Eligible voters		95,142			
Liberal hold		Swing		+9.39	
Source: Elections Canada

2021 federal election redistributed results
Party	Vote	%
Liberal	27,667	43.16
Conservative	23,620	36.85
New Democratic	9,419	14.69
People's	1,771	2.76
Green	1,626	2.54
Total valid votes	64,103	99.35
Rejected ballots	417	0.65
Registered voters/ estimated turnout	88,975	72.51

== See also ==
- List of Canadian electoral districts
