= Kanata—Carleton (federal electoral district) =

Defunct federal electoral district in Ontario, Canada

Coordinates: 45.371°N 76.097°W

Ontario electoral district

Federal electoral district
- Legislature: House of Commons
- District created: 2013
- District abolished: 2023
- First contested: 2015
- Last contested: 2021
- District webpage: profile, map

Demographics
- Population (2016): 110,960
- Electors (2015): 78,431
- Area (km²): 795
- Census division: Ottawa
- Census subdivision: Ottawa

Kanata—Carleton was a federal electoral district in Ottawa, Ontario.

Kanata—Carleton was created by the 2012 federal electoral boundaries redistribution and was legally defined in the 2013 representation order. It came into effect upon the call of the 2015 federal election. The new riding contains almost all of the portion of the former Carleton—Mississippi Mills located in Ottawa, except for the portion south of Highway 7/Highway 417 that transferred to Carleton. A small fraction came from Nepean—Carleton surrounding the Bridlewood neighbourhood.

== Geography ==
The riding covers an area within a boundary defined as follows: Western limit of Ottawa starting at Highway 7. NE along Highway7 to Highway 417. NE along Highway 417 to Maple Grove Road. NE along Maple Grove Road to the Carp River. SE along the Carp River to the SW section of Spearman Lane. NE along Spearman Lane to Terry Fox Drive. SE along Terry Fox to Hope Side Road. NE along Hope Side Road to Richmond Road. N along Richmond Road to West Hunt Club Road. NW to Haanel Drive with Robertson Road. SW along Robertson Road to Eagleson Road. NW along Eagleson Road to March Road, Herzberg Road and March Valley Road to Riddell Road to the interprovincial boundary between Ontario and Quebec. along the boundary to the north limit of the city of Ottawa then SW and SE along the northern and western limits of the city to the point of commencement.

== 2022 Federal Redistribution ==
The 2022 Canadian federal electoral redistribution saw most of the riding's western portion carved away, with most of the more urban eastern portion forming the core of the new riding of Kanata.

The community of Bells Corners was moved from Nepean riding into Kanata;

Part of Carleton riding north of Hazeldean Road and west of Huntmar Road was reassigned to Kanata.

The largely rural portions west of the 417 and north of Craig's Side Road / Murphy Side Road / Constance Lake Road / Berry Side Road were moved to Carleton. This includes several rural communities: Fitzroy Harbour, Dunrobin, Kinburn and Constance Bay.

The north-west boundary has been moved east from Hertzburg Road to Davidson Side Road north of Carling Avenue. That portion has been moved into the Ottawa West—Nepean riding.

== Demographics ==
According to the 2021 Canadian census

Ethnic groups: 66.4% White, 8.0% Chinese, 7.0% South Asian, 3.8% Black, 3.4% Arab, 3.7% Indigenous, 1.8% Southeast Asian, 1.7% West Asian, 1.3% Latin American, 1.0% Filipino
Languages: 65.4% English, 6.0% French, 4.7% Mandarin, 2.6% Arabic, 1.5% Russian, 1.2% Cantonese, 1.2% Spanish
Religions: 51.2% Christian (26.3% Catholic, 5.4% Anglican, 4.4% United Church, 2.1% Christian Orthodox, 1.2% Presbyterian, 11.8% Other), 7.7% Muslim, 2.6% Hindu, 1.2% Buddhist, 35.1% None.
Median income: $54,400 (2020)
Average income: $69,100 (2020)

== Members of Parliament ==
This riding has elected the following members of Parliament:

Parliament	Years	Member	Party
Kanata—Carleton; Riding created from Carleton—Mississippi Mills and Nepean—Carleton
42nd	2015–2019	Karen McCrimmon	Liberal
43rd	2019–2021	Karen McCrimmon	Liberal
44th	2021–2025	Jenna Sudds	Liberal
Riding dissolved into Carleton and Kanata

== Election results ==
Graph of election results in Kanata—Carleton (minor parties that never got 2% of the vote or didn't run consistently are omitted) View source data.

2021 Canadian federal election
Party	Candidate	Votes	%	±%	Expenditures
Liberal	Jenna Sudds	26,394	41.8	−1.5	$88,313.94
Conservative	Jennifer McAndrew	24,373	38.6	+2.1	$89,188.03
New Democratic	Melissa Coenraad	8,822	14.0	+1.5	$21,505.67
People's	Scott Miller	1,858	2.9	+1.5	$7,855.45
Green	Jennifer Purdy	1,709	2.7	−3.9	$6,771.03
Total valid votes		63,156			
Total rejected ballots		372			
Turnout		63,528	73.52		
Eligible voters		86,404			
Liberal hold		Swing		−1.8	
Source: Elections Canada

2019 Canadian federal election
Party	Candidate	Votes	%	±%	Expenditures
Liberal	Karen McCrimmon	28,746	43.05	−8.24	$101,971.36
Conservative	Justina McCaffrey	24,361	36.48	−2.73	none listed
New Democratic	Melissa Coenraad	8,317	12.46	+5.64	$17,833.67
Green	Jennifer Purdy	4,387	6.57	+3.88	$15,580.62
People's	Scott Miller	961	1.44		$0.00
Total valid votes/expense limit		66,772	99.35		
Total rejected ballots		438	0.65	+0.35	
Turnout		67,210	77.00	−1.96	
Eligible voters		87,281			
Liberal hold		Swing		−2.76	
Source: Elections Canada

2015 Canadian federal election
Party	Candidate	Votes	%	±%	Expenditures
Liberal	Karen McCrimmon	32,447	51.29	+24.82	$114,216.22
Conservative	Walter Pamic	24,829	39.21	−14.50	$98,315.02
New Democratic	John Hansen	4,313	6.81	−8.48	$24,279.11
Green	Andrew West	1,704	2.69	−1.85	$8,506.35
Total valid votes/Expense limit		63,323	99.70		$214,203.12
Total rejected ballots		191	0.30	–	
Turnout		63,514	78.97	–	
Eligible voters		80,433			
Liberal notional gain from Conservative		Swing		+19.66	
Source: Elections Canada

2011 federal election redistributed results
Party	Vote	%
Conservative	27,285	53.71
Liberal	13,445	26.46
New Democratic	7,766	15.29
Green	2,307	4.54

== See also ==
- List of Canadian electoral districts
- Historical federal electoral districts of Canada
