= Georges Vanier Catholic School =

Location
- 40 Varley Drive; Kanata, Ontario; Canada; 45.3322°N 75.9072°W

Information
- School type: elementary school
- Religious affiliation: Catholic
- Founded: 1967
- School board: Ottawa Catholic School Board
- Grades: JK-6
- Language: English/French
- Website: geo.ocsb.ca

Georges Vanier Catholic School is an elementary school in the community of Beaverbrook, in Ottawa, Ontario, Canada. (Next door is the W. Erskine Johnston Public School.) It has classes from junior kindergarten to grade 6. The school is in the Zone 2 (Kanata) school board district of the Ottawa Catholic School Board.

== History ==
The school is named after former Canadian Governor General Georges Vanier who died in 1967, the same year the school opened. The school logo has a stylized initial "G" superimposed on the initial "V," with a maple leaf commemorating Canada's Centennial Year of 1967, the year in which the school opened, and a cross in the background. The white background and the red outline of the logo reflect the school colours.

Prior to the school's opening, the students were being housed at Our Lady Of Peace Catholic School in nearby Bells Corners.

Georges Vanier has seen its student population fluctuate over time, often creating the need for up to eight portables on site prior to the formation of another school. Five schools have been constructed to relieve over crowding: St Martin De Porress Catholic School, Holy Redeemer Catholic School, St Gabriels, St James Catholic School and St Anne Catholic School.

The school celebrated its 25th anniversary in 1992.

== Principals ==
- Greg Peddie
- Russ Graham
- Garry Valiquette
- Margaret McGrath
- Andy Groulx
- Bert O’Connor
- Robert Curry
- Marcia Lynch
- Susan McCarthy
- Heather MacPhee
- Caroline O'Connor
- Aden Semenchuk
- Craig Skinner
