= Simon Pulsifer =

Canadian Wikipedian (born 1981)

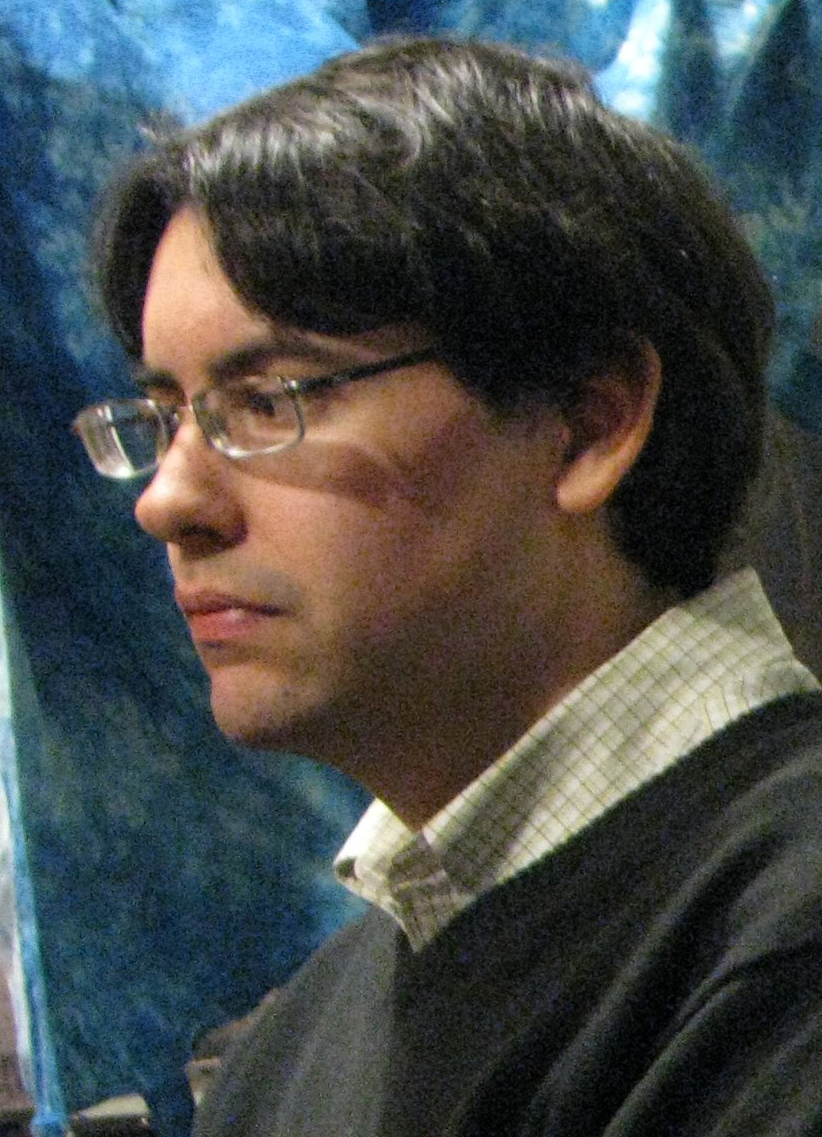
- Pulsifer in 2011
- Born: Simon Edward Pulsifer; September 11, 1981 (age 45); Halifax, Nova Scotia, Canada
- Other name: SimonP
- Occupation: Writer
- Employer: Ontario New Democratic Party

Simon Edward Pulsifer (born September 11, 1981) is a Canadian contributor to the English-language Wikipedia whose prolific participation made him a "minor media celebrity".

== English Wikipedia ==
Pulsifer became an active contributor to the English Wikipedia on December 10, 2001 under the username SimonP, just after hearing about the site from The New York Times Magazine. In 2006, he said he spent over 40 hours a week on Wikipedia. He has been an administrator since at least 2006, and is a former member of Wikipedia's Arbitration Committee.

Pulsifer's productivity at Wikipedia has made him the subject of human interest stories in the local press. Together with Jimmy Wales he appeared on the On Point show on August 2, 2006. In December 2006, Time's annual "Person of the Year" issue contained a feature about Pulsifer. On February 6, 2011, Wikimedia's Executive Director Sue Gardner presented him with a token of appreciation from the Wikipedia community for being one of their most prolific writers and editors.

== Personal life ==
Pulsifer was born in Halifax, Nova Scotia, and was raised in Ottawa, Ontario. He has a brother, Andrew. In June 2000, he graduated from Lisgar Collegiate Institute, and went on to study history at the University of Toronto, Victoria College.

Residing in Toronto (as of 2007), he lived in Ottawa for many years. He has worked for the political campaigns of politicians in both cities—Paul Dewar (Ottawa Centre) and Olivia Chow (Trinity—Spadina)—and was the database manager for 2006 Ottawa mayoral candidate Alex Munter.

== See also ==
- List of Wikipedia people
