= John Mlacak =

Canadian politician and painter (1936–2014)

Reeve of March Township
- In office 1968–1976
- Preceded by: Harold N. Craig
- Succeeded by: Marianne Wilkinson

Personal details
- Born: February 27, 1936 Windsor, Ontario
- Died: September 19, 2014 (aged 78) Kanata, Ontario
- Spouse: Beth
- Education: Queen's University

John Mlacak (February 27, 1936 – September 19, 2014) was a Canadian politician and painter. He served as reeve of March Township, Ontario from 1968 to 1976.

== Life ==
Mlacak was born in 1936 in Windsor, Ontario, the son of Croat immigrants. He received a bachelor's and master's degree in engineering from Queen's University. After his education, he began working for the Northern Electric Company, which later became Nortel. He stayed with Nortel until 1995. During his career, he also served as a commissioner with the National Capital Commission and was on the planning committee for the Regional Municipality of Ottawa-Carleton.

In 1964, Mlacak and his wife were one of the first families to move to the new subdivision of Beaverbrook. He was interested in planning issues and was excited about the prospect of beginning a community from scratch, which spurred an interest to enter politics. He served as reeve of the then-mostly rural March Township from 1968 to 1976. The rapidly suburbanizing township would become the City of Kanata in 1978, and would later be amalgamated into Ottawa in 2001.

During his retirement, Mlacak focused on a career in painting. He co-founded the Kanata Civic Art Gallery and one of his works was featured in the Croatian Embassy. He was elected as a member of the Society of Canadian Artists in 2009.
