= Marianne Wilkinson =

Canadian politician

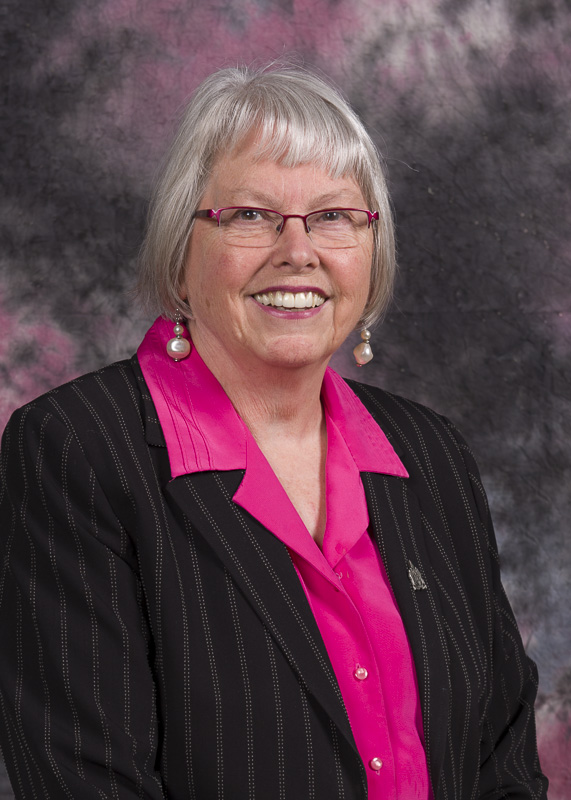

Ottawa City Councillor
- In office December 1, 2006 – December 1, 2018
- Preceded by: Peggy Feltmate
- Succeeded by: Jenna Sudds
- Constituency: Kanata North Ward

1st Mayor of Kanata
- In office 1978–1985
- Succeeded by: Des Adam

Reeve of March Township
- In office 1976–1978
- Preceded by: John Mlacak

March Township Councillor
- In office 1970–1975
- Preceded by: Willard Morgan, Ronald Andoff, John McIlveen
- Succeeded by: Bob Kingham, Bill Lund

Personal details
- Born: 1937 or 1938 (age 87–88) Ottawa, Ontario, Canada
- Party: Progressive Conservative (until 2003); Liberal (since 2003)
- Spouse: Robert Stringer Wilkinson (m. 1961)

Marianne Margaret Wilkinson (née Berton) is a Canadian local politician and ex-Councillor for Kanata North (Ward 4) in Ottawa, Ontario, Canada.

== Career ==
Wilkinson was born in Ottawa, the daughter of Mr. and Mrs. Vivian Francis Rowe Berton. The family moved to Calgary when she was nine, but returned 9 years later. She finished high school at Glebe Collegiate Institute. After high school, she graduated in geography from Trinity College, University of Toronto. After university, she began her career as a high school teacher. The family moved to Kanata in 1968 where she immediately joined the Kanata Beaverbrook Community Association. The next year, she was elected to March Township Council, winning 635 votes. She finished in 4th place in the four-seat at-large election. She was a member of the March Township council from 1970 to 1975, the first woman to run for a seat there. At the time of her first election her three children were 5, 2 and 4 months. In 1976 she became the first female Reeve of March Township and the council had a majority of women. In 1978 she helped create an amalgamation of March Township with parts of Goulbourn and Nepean Townships. The name Kanata was approved by a vote of the electorate. From 1978 to 1985, she served as Kanata's first mayor following its incorporation.

Wilkinson served as a mayor for seven years and regional councillor for nine years as Reeve and Mayor, from 1976 to 1985, and returned for a further term as a councillor in Kanata from 1991 to 1994. In 1994 she ran to represent Kanata at the Regional Municipality of Ottawa–Carleton, but lost to Alex Munter. After Kanata was amalgamated with Ottawa in 2001, Wilkinson was elected to Ottawa City Council in the 2006 election. She was re-elected as councillor of Ward 4, Kanata North, in the 2010 and 2014 Ottawa municipal election.

Wilkinson announced on March 6, 2018, that she would not run for re-election. but return to community service. She is working to create a health hub in Kanata to provide needed medical services; as a consultant to provide advice to municipal audit committees and as Warden for St. John's Anglican church. She continues to support many community groups as well.

In 2021, Wilkinson applied for her old position as city councillor for Kanata North, after city council decided to appoint a councillor rather than hold a by-election after the seat was vacated by her successor, Jenna Sudds. In a city council vote, Wilkinson lost to Cathy Curry, 12–8.

Wilkinson used to be a Progressive Conservative, and served on the PC Party's Provincial Executive. She left the party in 2003. She then ran in the 2003 provincial election as a Liberal and finished second against Norm Sterling with 23,466 votes (38.79%).

As a lifetime volunteer she helped in creating the Kanata Food Cupboard, the Western Ottawa Community Resource Centre, the Kanata Choral Association among others. She served on executives of the Council of Women at the local, provincial and national levels; on the Canadian Federation of University Women executive in Kanata and nationally; and supported many other local organizations. During her years on municipal councils she served on the executive of the Association of Municipalities in Ontario becoming president in 1985 and on the Board of the Federation of Canadian Municipalities. When not in elected office she worked for Parks Canada, as a Realtor and for non profit organizations. Wilkinson is a long-time resident of Kanata and a veteran public servant in the former city.

== Personal life ==
Wilkinson has three children, two sons and a daughter. She has 4 granddaughters.
