= Peggy Feltmate =

Ottawa City Councillor
- In office 2006–2010
- Preceded by: constituency established
- Succeeded by: Allan Hubley
- Constituency: Kanata South Ward

Ottawa City Councillor
- In office 2003–2006
- Preceded by: Alex Munter
- Succeeded by: constituency abolished
- Constituency: Kanata Ward

Personal details
- Born: 1949 (age 76–77) Wallaceburg, Ontario, Canada

Peggy Feltmate is Canadian politician who was Ottawa city councillor representing Kanata South Ward from 2003 to 2010.

She was born in Wallaceburg, Ontario, in 1949 and was first elected in the 2003 Ottawa election to replace outgoing councillor Alex Munter in Kanata Ward. She had won plaudits for her efforts at the Western Ottawa Community Resource Centre and was backed by Munter and other well-known Kanata figures.

During her first term in office, Feltmate helped prevent development of the area around Beaver Pond.

Due to population growth, her ward was split in two in 2006. She was re-elected in 2006 in the new Kanata South Ward.

In February 2010, Feltmate announced that she would not run for re-election in the 2010 Ottawa municipal election, though she would continue to serve the community on a part-time, volunteer basis.

== Electoral record ==
2006 Ottawa City Council election: Kanata South Ward (Ward 23)
Candidate	Votes	%
Peggy Feltmate (X)	8344	50.05%
Allan Hubley	5631	33.78%
Amrik Dhami	1314	7.88%
Richard Rutkowski	811	4.86%
Suraj Harish	571	3.43%

2003 Ottawa City Council election: Kanata Ward (Ward 4)
Candidate	Votes	%
Peggy Feltmate	12,260	70.58%
Richard Rutkowski	4,166	23.98%
Donald Leafloor	561	3.23%
Grant Johnston	384	2.21%

Preceded by Alex Munter	City councillors from Kanata Ward; 2003-2006	Succeeded by Ward abolished
Preceded by Ward created	City councillors from Kanata South Ward; 2006-2010	Succeeded by Allan Hubley
