= Jenna Sudds =

Canadian politician (born 1979)

The Honourable Jenna Sudds PC MP
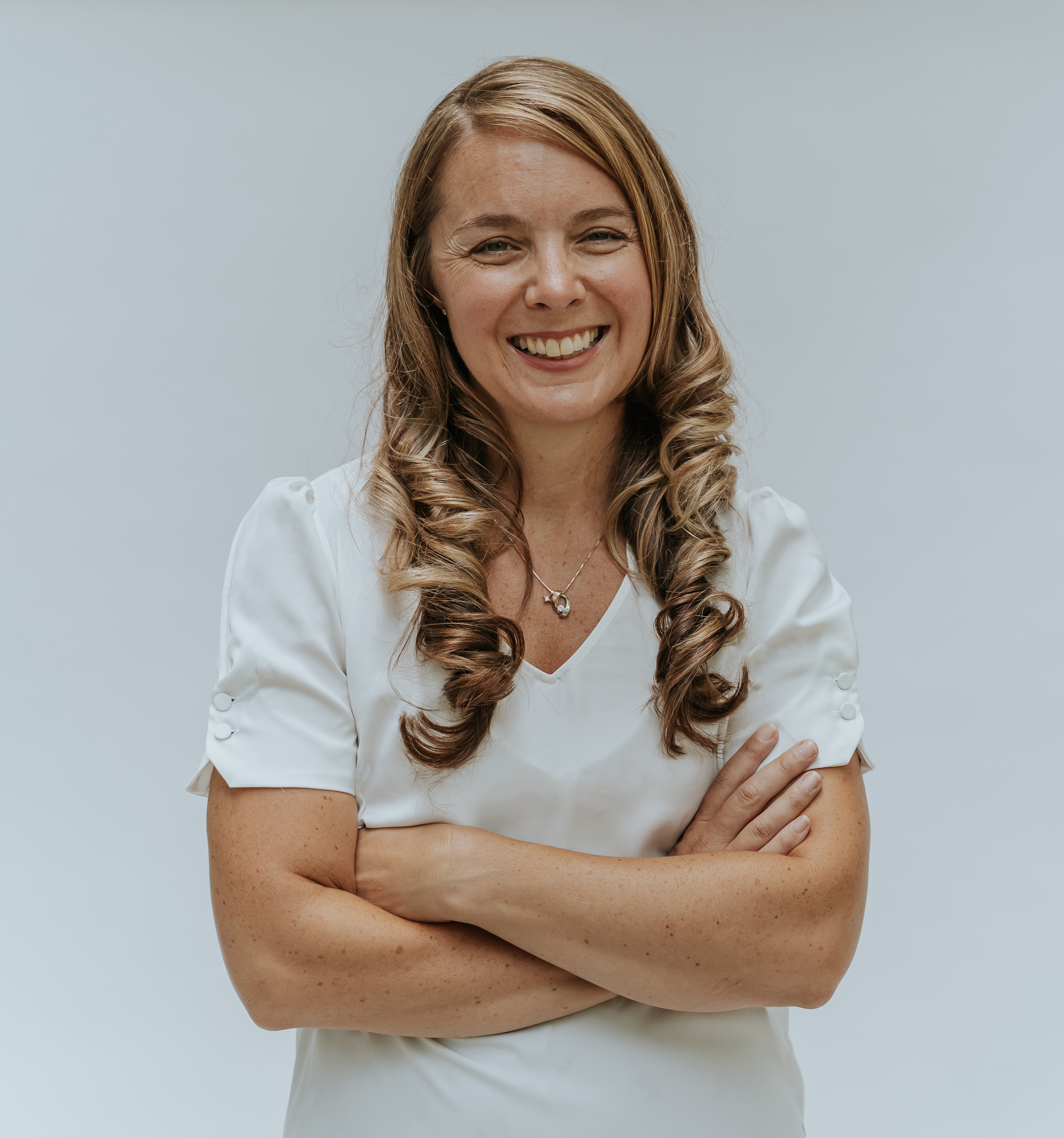
- Jenna Sudds in 2021

Parliamentary Secretary to the Minister of Government Transformation, Public Services and Procurement
- Incumbent
- Assumed office June 5, 2025

Parliamentary Secretary to the Secretary of State (Defence Procurement)
- Incumbent
- Assumed office June 5, 2025

Minister of Families, Children and Social Development
- In office July 26, 2023 – March 14, 2025
- Prime Minister: Justin Trudeau
- Preceded by: Karina Gould
- Succeeded by: Steve MacKinnon

Member of Parliament for Kanata Kanata—Carleton (2021–2025)
- Incumbent
- Assumed office September 20, 2021
- Preceded by: Karen McCrimmon

Ottawa City Councillor for Kanata North (Ward 4)
- In office December 1, 2018 – September 20, 2021
- Preceded by: Marianne Wilkinson
- Succeeded by: Cathy Curry (appointed)

Deputy Mayor of Ottawa
- In office December 9, 2020 – September 20, 2021 Serving with Laura Dudas and George Darouze
- Mayor: Jim Watson
- Preceded by: Matthew Luloff
- Succeeded by: Vacant

Personal details
- Born: February 8, 1979 (age 47) Oakville, Ontario, Canada
- Party: Liberal
- Spouse: Tim McDonald

Jenna Sudds (born February 8, 1979) is a Canadian politician who has been the member of Parliament (MP) for Kanata since 2021. A member of the Liberal Party, Sudds was the minister of families, children and social development from 2023 to 2025. Previously, Sudds was an Ottawa City Councillor, representing Ward 4 Kanata North from 2018 to 2021 and served as a deputy mayor from 2020 to 2021.

== Career ==
Sudds grew up in Niagara Falls, Ontario. Sudds attended Brock University in St. Catharines and moved to the National Capital Region in 2001 to complete her master's degree in economics at Carleton University. Sudds worked as an economist in the federal government for twelve years before becoming the inaugural President and executive director of the Kanata North Business Association, after being appointed to the role by a hiring committee that consisted of her predecessor on Council, Marianne Wilkinson. From November 2017 to November 2018, Sudds was the inaugural executive director at the CIO Strategy Council, a national technology council. In March 2018, she announced her decision to run for Ottawa City Council, Kanata North. In December 2020, she was appointed to serve as Deputy Mayor of Ottawa.

Sudds has been a longtime volunteer with the Kanata Food Cupboard and the Ottawa Network for Education. She has received a Special Recognition Award from the Kanata Food Cupboard for her leadership and service to those in need in the community. She received a Forty Under 40 Award from the Ottawa Business Journal and the Ottawa Chamber of Commerce in 2015, and was named one of Development Counsellors International's Top 40 under 40 working in economic development in 2017. On March 14, Ottawa MP Jenna Sudds was shuffled out of cabinet.

The removal of Sudds, who was minister of Families, Children and Social Development, came the morning of March 14 as new Prime Minister Mark Carney unveiled a leaner cabinet with nearly half the number of ministers.

== Politics ==
Sudds was elected as a Liberal in Kanata—Carleton in the 2021 Canadian federal election, replacing outgoing Liberal Member of Parliament Karen McCrimmon.

=== 44th Parliament ===
Sudds was appointed to serve as the Parliamentary Secretary to the Minister of Women, Gender Equality, and Youth by Prime Minister Justin Trudeau on December 3, 2021. Sudds sat on the Standing Committee on the Status of Women as a voting member from December 1, 2021 through September 25, 2023.

Throughout her tenure, Sudds has seconded and voted in favour of legislation which sought to advance women's rights, affordable housing, and worker's rights. She supported legislation to ban the practice of conversion therapy, which passed the House of Commons in a unanimous vote. She is a strong supporter of economic actions to strengthen Canada's technology sector, particularly semiconductor fabrication and critical mineral development.

In foreign policy, she has supported sanctions against Russian political leaders and oligarchs in response to the 2022 Russian invasion of Ukraine, and sanctions against Iran following the Mahsa Amini protests.

After the Russian invasion of Ukraine, Sudds, like many other Canadian Parliamentarians, was sanctioned by government of Russia after the Canadian government sanctioned many Russian officials close to Vladimir Putin over his Ukrainian invasion.

== Awards ==
- Kanata North Citizen of the Year (2012–2013)
- Forty Under 40 Award (2015) from the Ottawa Business Journal and Ottawa Board of Trade
- 40 Under 40 International Economic Development Professional Award (2016)

== Electoral record ==
=== Federal ===
2025 Canadian federal election: Kanata
Party	Candidate	Votes	%	±%
Liberal	Jenna Sudds	45,244	60.76	+17.60
Conservative	Greg Kung	26,557	35.67	+1.18
New Democratic	Melissa Simon	1,702	2.29	–12.41
Green	Jennifer Purdy	835	1.12	–1.42
Centrist	Moinuddin Siddiqui	122	0.16	N/A
Total valid votes		74,460	99.39	
Total rejected ballots		457	0.61	-0.04
Turnout		74,917	78.33	+5.82
Eligible voters		95,641		
Liberal hold		Swing		+9.39
Source: Elections Canada

2021 Canadian federal election: Kanata—Carleton
Party	Candidate	Votes	%	±%
Liberal	Jenna Sudds	26,394	41.8	−1.5
Conservative	Jennifer McAndrew	24,373	38.6	+2.1
New Democratic	Melissa Coenraad	8,822	14.0	+1.5
People's	Scott Miller	1,858	2.9	+1.5
Green	Jennifer Purdy	1,709	2.7	−3.9
Total valid votes		63,156		
Total rejected ballots		372		
Turnout		63,528	73.52	
Eligible voters		86,404		
Liberal hold		Swing		−1.8
Source: Elections Canada

=== 2018 Ottawa municipal election ===
Council candidate	Vote	%
Jenna Sudds	5,298	46.68
Matt Muirhead	3,634	32.02
David Gourlay	2,335	20.57
Lorne Neufeldt	56	0.49
Philip Bloedow	27	0.24

== Personal life ==
Sudds is married and has three daughters.
