= Cathy Curry =

Canadian politician

Ottawa City Councillor
- Incumbent
- Assumed office November 12, 2021
- Preceded by: Jenna Sudds
- Constituency: Kanata North Ward

Ottawa-Carleton District School Board Trustee
- In office 2006–2012
- Preceded by: Jim Libbey
- Succeeded by: Christine Boothby
- Constituency: Zone 2 (Kanata)

Chair of the Ottawa-Carleton District School Board
- In office December 2009 – December 1, 2010
- Preceded by: Lynn Scott
- Succeeded by: Jennifer McKenzie

Personal details
- Born: Scarborough, Ontario
- Children: 4

Cathy Ann Greene Curry (born c. 1968) is a Canadian politician. She is currently the city councillor for Kanata North Ward on Ottawa City Council, having been appointed to that position on November 10, 2021.

== Early life ==
Curry was raised in Scarborough, Ontario, the daughter of an Italian mother and Newfoundlander father. She was educated at the University of Western Ontario, where she received a bachelor's of English Language and Literature, and at Niagara University in Lewiston, New York where she received a Masters of Science in Education. Following her university education, Curry taught at Timothy Eaton Business and Technical Institute in Scarborough, then moved to Boston with her husband, who was attending the Massachusetts Institute of Technology (MIT).

Curry moved to Kanata, where her husband grew up, in 1992. Curry was an English literature high school teacher at Sir Guy Carleton Secondary School, Sir Robert Borden High School, A.Y. Jackson Secondary School and West Carleton Secondary School until 1999, when she retired to spend more time with her family. Following her retirement, she served as a school council chair.

== School trustee ==
Curry, described as an "education activist" was elected as an Ottawa-Carleton District School Board trustee in the 2006 Ottawa municipal election without any opposition. As a member of the board, Curry supported eliminating the Catholic school board despite being a Catholic herself. Curry was appointed as the chair of the School Board in 2009, replacing Lynn Scott. Curry was re-elected in the 2010 Ottawa municipal election, defeating Christine Boothby. She did not offer re-election as Chair of the Board. Curry resigned her seat in 2012, stating that "she's so sick of the board's dysfunction", and called on the Ministry of Education "to introduce sweeping changes to the way public school trustees conduct business... and to launch and investigation into how (the board) govern themselves". She was replaced on the board by Boothby, her opponent in the 2010 election.

== Council appointment ==
Following Curry's predecessor, Jenna Sudds being elected to Canadian Parliament in the 2021 Canadian federal election, city council opted to appoint a replacement rather than hold a by-election, citing the cost of holding a by-election ($500,000), COVID-19 restrictions, and the need to have the seat full immediately to participate in the 2022 budget. Twelve members of City council (including mayor Jim Watson) voted for Curry versus eight who voted for previous city councillor Marianne Wilkinson. Three councillors voted for other candidates. Wilkinson had been "presented as the top choice of community associations in Kanata", though Curry stated she had consulted with Sudds and local MPP Merrilee Fullerton prior to her appointment. Curry did not promise to not run for election in the 2022 Ottawa municipal election.

Prior to her appointment to council, Curry served as a board member at CHEO, the Caldwell Family Centre, Ronald McDonald House Ottawa, the Ontario Centre of Excellence for Child and Youth Mental Health and Ottawa Fusion Volleyball.

Curry endorsed Yasir Naqvi in his candidacy for leader of the Ontario Liberal Party in the 2023 Ontario Liberal Party leadership election.
