= Frank Reid (Canadian football) =

Canadian football player and politician (1946–2002)

Profile
- Position: Defensive tackle

Personal information
- Born: February 11, 1946; Belleville, Ontario, Canada
- Died: October 20, 2022 (aged 76)
- Listed height: 6 ft 2 in (1.88 m)
- Listed weight: 235 lb (107 kg)

Career information
- College: Buffalo

Career history
- 1970–1975: Ottawa Rough Riders
- 1970–1971: Winnipeg Blue Bombers

Awards and highlights
- Grey Cup champion (1973)

Clifford Frank Reid (February 11, 1946–October 20, 2022) was a Canadian professional football player and politician. He played for the Ottawa Rough Riders and Winnipeg Blue Bombers, and played college football at the University at Buffalo. After his football career, he spent 11 years on Nepean City Council, including six years as a member of the Ottawa-Carleton Regional Council.

The son of Clifford and Kathleen Reid, Frank Reid moved to Ottawa at the age of 12, and attended Fisher Park High School. After his football career, he moved back to the Ottawa area in 1976, and began a career as a computer salesman. He later entered politics, running twice unsuccessfully for a spot on Nepean City Council before being elected in 1980. At the time of the 1980 election, he was a tax consultant and promised to "improve rapport between business and council, provide more activities for youth and improve long-range road planning". He served on city council until 1991, and also as an Ottawa-Carleton regional councillor for Nepean from 1985 to 1991. He ran for the Chair position of the Regional Municipality of Ottawa-Carleton in 1991 and 1994.

In around 1988, Reid moved to Gloucester, still part of the Ottawa-Carleton Region, which was amalgamated into Ottawa in 2001. He ran for Ottawa City Council in the 2003 Ottawa municipal election in Beacon Hill-Cyrville Ward.

As of the 1991 election, he was separated from his wife Connie, and he was living with regional councillor Fiona Faucher. He would later marry Faucher. Later in life, he married Louise Matte. He had three children.

== Federal politics ==
In 1984, he ran for the nomination of the Progressive Conservative Party of Canada in that year's federal election in the riding of Nepean—Carleton. He won just 80 votes before being eliminated after the second ballot, losing to the eventual winner Bill Tupper. He ran against Tupper again for the Tory nomination in the 1988 Canadian federal election in the new riding of Nepean, but lost again, 717 votes to 427. Reid ran for the nomination again in the 1993 Canadian federal election, but lost to Donna Hicks by just two votes on the second ballot.

== Death ==
Reid died of cancer in 2022.
