= Peter D. Clark (politician) =

Canadian politician (born 1938)

Ottawa City Councillor
- In office December 1, 2010 – November 30, 2014
- Preceded by: Jacques Legendre
- Succeeded by: Tobi Nussbaum
- Constituency: Rideau-Rockcliffe Ward

Mayor of Cumberland Reeve from 1980 to 1982
- In office 1980–1989
- Preceded by: Henri Rocque
- Succeeded by: Brian Coburn

Regional Chair of Ottawa-Carleton
- In office January 1, 1992 – January 1, 1998
- Preceded by: Andy Haydon
- Succeeded by: Bob Chiarelli

Personal details
- Born: January 27, 1938 (age 88) Windsor, Ontario
- Education: University of Windsor; University of Michigan

Peter D. Clark (born January 27, 1938, in Windsor, Ontario) was Regional Chair of Ottawa-Carleton from 1991 to 1997.

He received a BComm degree from the University of Windsor in 1964 and an MBA from the University of Michigan in 1974. He was mayor of Cumberland Township, Ontario from 1980 to 1989. Clark was defeated by Bob Chiarelli in an election for the position of Regional Chair in 1997. He was appointed director of the Standards Council of Canada in April 1999 and was re-appointed in 2005.

He was voted into council for Ottawa City Council in the Rideau-Rockcliffe Ward at the 2010 municipal election.

In January 2011 he expressed his belief that safety for pedestrians and cyclists is a priority in the city. He supports the bridge to be built over the Rideau river (in his ward), and said this will create a connection to the Laurier Bike Lane to be built if the draft budget was approved. Earlier he indicated Ottawa has to become a city with 21st-century transportation. He also supported the green bin introduction, despite his reputation for fiscal conservatism.

== See also ==
- Mauril Bélanger - former Chief of Staff for Clark as Regional Chair and later Ottawa MP
