= Merle Nicholds =

3rd Mayor of Kanata, Ontario
- In office 1991–2000
- Preceded by: Des Adam

Personal details
- Born: 1950 Stratford, Ontario

Merle Nicholds (born c. 1950) served as the final mayor of Kanata, Ontario from 1991 to 2000.

Her background was in nursing and was employed by the Scarborough Health Department Metropolitan Toronto until 1982. In 1990, after moving from Calgary with her lawyer husband and two children, she became the first president of the Kanata Lakes Community Association.

Nicholds defeated Kanata's second mayor, Des Adam, in the 12 November 1991 municipal election and was re-elected for two more terms. Nicholds retired from politics after completing her third term in office and did not campaign in the 2000 municipal elections. At that point, the Government of Ontario ordered the formation of a new City of Ottawa government which replaced Kanata and all other local governments within the Regional Municipality of Ottawa-Carleton.
