= Des Adam =

Canadian politician

2nd Mayor of Kanata, Ontario
- In office 1985–1991
- Preceded by: Marianne Wilkinson
- Succeeded by: Merle Nicholds

Personal details
- Born: 9 September 1945 (age 80) Perth, Ontario, Canada

Des Adam (born 9 September 1945 in Perth, Ontario) served as the second mayor of Kanata, Ontario from 1985 to 1991.

Adam served for two terms as mayor until he was defeated by Merle Nicholds in the 12 November 1991 municipal election. He currently remains in the community working as a real estate lawyer.
