= Ben Franklin (Canadian politician) =

Canadian politician (1942–2003)

Mayor of Nepean
- In office 1978–1997
- Preceded by: Andy Haydon
- Succeeded by: Mary Pitt

Member of Nepean City Council
- In office 1973–1978

Personal details
- Born: Benson Franklin; August 15, 1942 Elgin, Ontario, Canada
- Died: March 23, 2003 (aged 60)
- Party: Ontario Liberal Party
- Spouse: Sherrell Franklin (née Willman)
- Education: Carleton University

Benson Franklin (August 15, 1942 – March 22, 2003) was a Canadian teacher and politician who served as mayor of the city of Nepean, Ontario from 1978 to 1997.

== Early life ==
Franklin was born in Elgin, Ontario on August 15, 1942, one of three children. Franklin's mother was a school teacher and his father worked at a cheese factory before serving in the Second World War. The factory closed by the time his father returned and the family moved to Ottawa, living in the downtown area before moving to the west end. His father found work as a taxi driver and, later, became manager of the Red Line taxi fleet at the Ottawa Airport.

As a teenager, Franklin attended Glebe Collegiate and, later, Laurentian High School. He studied at Carleton University and Ottawa Teacher's College. He worked for the Ottawa Board of Education as a geography teacher – at both the elementary and high school level – from 1964 to 1978. He married Sherrell Willman and the couple had two children.

== Political career ==
Franklin was first elected to the Nepean council in 1972 and he took office in January 1973. He continued working at as a teacher, as the council position was a part-time job. In 1975, he ran unsuccessfully as the Liberal candidate in the riding of Carleton in the Ontario general election.

Franklin was first elected mayor in the 1978 municipal election, defeating fellow councillor Robert C. Mitchell. Franklin was Nepean's second mayor following Andrew Haydon, who had held the position for the six days following Nepean's incorporation. As mayor, Franklin established a "pay as you go" policy which brought the city out of debt. He retired in 1997 due to health problems. His executive assistant, Mary Pitt, succeeded him as mayor of Nepean after running a campaign that promised to continue Franklin's vision. Nepean became part of the city of Ottawa in 2001.

== Later life ==
Franklin received an artificial heart in March 2003 but died of heart failure later that month at the age of 60.

== Awards and recognition ==
Ben Franklin Place at Centrepointe was named after Franklin. In 2001, he was the first person to be given an honorary key to the new city of Ottawa.

== Electoral record ==
1975 Ontario general election: Carleton
Party	Candidate	Votes	%
Progressive Conservative	Sid Handleman	12,653	38.87
Liberal	Ben Franklin	11,977	36.79
New Democratic	Gordon Kritsch	7,769	23.86
Independent	Michael Sammon	157	0.48
Total valid votes		32,556	
Turnout		–	68.68
Eligible voters		47,400	
