= Guy Cousineau =

Guy Cousineau (born June 4, 1937) was the last mayor of the city of Vanier before it was amalgamated with Ottawa in 2001.

He was born in Eastview, which was later renamed Vanier, in 1937, the son of Trefflé Cousineau and Augustine Charette. His grandfather, Jean-Baptiste Charette, was mayor of Eastview in 1936. Cousineau was first elected to Vanier city council in 1974, was Vanier's regional councillor from 1988 to 1991 and became mayor in 1991. He succeeded Gisèle Lalonde to become the 17th and last mayor of the city.

Cousineau was employed at Bell Canada. He married Raymonde Proulx in 1962 and Yolande Patry in 1984.
