= Regional Municipality of Ottawa–Carleton =

Coordinates: 45°10′N 75°45′W

Regional Municipality of Ottawa-Carleton
- Dissolved region
- Flag Seal Coat of arms

- Municipal boundaries of the former Regional Municipality of Ottawa-Carleton.
- Country: Canada
- Province: Ontario
- Region: Eastern Ontario
- Created: January 1, 1969
- Dissolved: January 1, 2001

Area
  - Total: 1,073 km^{2} (414 sq mi)

Population (1996)
  - Total: 721,136
- Time zone: UTC−05:00 (EST)
  - Summer (DST): UTC−04:00 (DST)
- Area code: 613
- Seat: Ottawa
- Municipalities: Ottawa, Cumberland, Gloucester, Goulbourn, Kanata, Nepean, Osgoode, Rideau, Rockcliffe Park, Vanier, West Carleton

The Regional Municipality of Ottawa–Carleton (RMOC) was a regional municipality and census division in Ontario, Canada, that existed between January 1, 1969, and January 1, 2001. Primarily centred on the City of Ottawa, it was created in 1969 by restructuring Carleton County and annexing Cumberland Township from the United Counties of Prescott and Russell into the newly created Region of Ottawa–Carleton.

It was the second regional municipality to be created in Ontario after the Municipality of Metropolitan Toronto. It served as an upper-tier level of municipal government, aggregating municipal services on a region-wide basis like the counties and regional municipalities of southern Ontario, and was the only upper-tier municipal government ever created in eastern Ontario. The regional municipality was dissolved upon the creation of the amalgamated City of Ottawa on January 1, 2001.

== Constituent municipalities ==
The regional municipality originally consisted of the cities of Ottawa and Eastview, the villages of Rockcliffe Park, Richmond and Stittsville, and the townships of Torbolton, Fitzroy, Huntley, March, Goulbourn, Nepean, Osgoode, Marlborough, North Gower, Gloucester and Cumberland. At the same time as the creation of the region, the City of Eastview was renamed the City of Vanier.

=== Chronology ===
- In 1974
  - The police villages of City View, Kenmore, Manotick, Metcalfe, North Gower, Osgoode Station, and St. Joseph d'Orleans were dissolved.
  - Goulbourn Township annexed the villages of Richmond and Stittsville.
  - The townships of Marlborough and North Gower merged to become Rideau Township.
  - At the same time, the townships of Torbolton, Fitzroy and Huntley merged to become West Carleton Township.
- In 1978
  - The Township of March and parts of Goulbourn and Nepean townships became the City of Kanata.
  - At the same time, the Township of Nepean became the City of Nepean.
- In 1981, the Township of Gloucester became the City of Gloucester.
- In 1999, the Township of Cumberland became the City of Cumberland.

== Purpose of regional government ==
The region, known as an "upper-tier" level of municipal government, was created to manage municipal services that crossed municipal boundaries and were more efficiently provided to residents on a regional, as opposed to local, basis. Over time, more and more services were transferred from the "lower-tier" municipalities to the region and, by the end of the 1990s, 85% of municipal services were delivered by the region. This included mass transit, policing, arterial roads, sewage, water, social services, garbage collection and regional planning. Periodic reorganization (e.g. rural townships acquiring city status, as in 1974 and 1978) did not impede the process.

However, the constituent municipalities of the RMOC were unified in a single City of Ottawa in 2001 by the Fewer Municipal Politicians Act of Ontario (1999), by the government of Premier Mike Harris, re-elected promising a "Common Sense Revolution." Several other Ontario conurbations were also unified under the act. Ottawa thus became in sheer area one of the largest municipalities in Canada, roughly 65 kilometres by 32, much of this farmland, although 90 per cent of the population live in urban concentrations.

When it was formed in 1969, the RMOC was a council of members selected by the municipal councils, who elected among themselves a regional chairman. In 1991, the regional chairman was for the first time directly elected by the people of the region, which municipal mayors earlier resisted, fearing the chairman would effectively become a "super mayor". In 1994, regional councillors were directly elected to represent regional wards, rather than being appointed from the lower-tier municipal councils. Many of the new regional wards crossed municipal boundaries, which in the eyes of many local residents undermined local or historical differences. Generally in Ontario regional government reforms of the 1990s were sometimes mistrusted as preparation for eventual creation of unified "mega-cities", but this was not before 1999 a topic of local political anxiety in Ottawa-Carleton.

== Regional chairs ==
The Regional Chair of Ottawa-Carleton was the head of the regional council that controlled the Regional Municipality of Ottawa-Carleton from its formation in 1968 to its amalgamation in 2001.

Originally the Regional Chair was selected by other members of regional council who were themselves posted to the council from the region's individual municipalities. From 1991 the position of regional chair was an elected position and as of 1994 regional councillors were elected. This position disappeared in 2001 when the Region and its municipalities were amalgamated into the city of Ottawa. The final Regional Chair was Bob Chiarelli who was subsequently elected Mayor of the amalgamated city.

- Denis Coolican 1968–1978
- Andrew S. Haydon 1978–1991
- Peter D. Clark 1991–1997
- Bob Chiarelli 1997–2000

== See also ==
- Municipal government of Ottawa
