= Rideauview Terrace =

Neighbourhood in Ottawa, Ontario, Canada

Coordinates: 45.3789°N 75.7043°W

Rideauview Terrace is a sub-neighbourhood of Carleton Heights in River Ward in the west-end of Ottawa, Ontario, Canada. It is located just west of the Rideau Canal. It is bordered by Prince of Wales Drive to the west, Heron Drive to the south, Rideau Canal to the east and the Central Experimental Farm to the north. It is across the Rideau Canal from Carleton University.

According to the Canada 2011 Census, there were 45 dwellings in the neighbourhood and it had a population of 98.

The neighbourhood consists of four streets: Green Valley Terrace, Fairchild Private and Rideauview Terrace, Peridot Private, plus a few houses on Prince of Wales. All the homes (except for five on Green Valley Drive) are detached houses and are relatively large and high in price. Fairchild Private and Rideauview Terrace were developed in the 1980s, Green Valley Crescent is older.

There are several office buildings at the corner of Prince of Wales and Heron/Baseline Road. Green Valley Crescent is home to a Ukrainian Catholic church and the Church of Jesus Christ of Latter Day Saints is on Prince of Wales.

== See also ==
- Rideau View
- Carleton Heights
