= Courtland Park =

- Neighbourhood
- Location within Ottawa
- Coordinates: 45°22′15″N 75°42′30″W
- Country: Canada
- Province: Ontario
- City: Ottawa

Government
  - MP: Catherine McKenna (Liberal)
  - MPP: Joel Harden (NDP)
  - Councillor: Riley Brockington
- Time zone: Eastern (EST)

Courtland Park is a sub-neighbourhood of Carleton Heights in River Ward in the west end of Ottawa, Ontario, Canada. It is bounded on the north by Baseline Road, on the east by the Rideau River, on the south by Dynes Road and on the west by Fisher Avenue. Prince of Wales Drive runs thorough the neighbourhood.

According to the Canada 2011 Census, the population of the neighbourhood was 2,807 (including apartments east of Prince of Wales and north of Hog's Back)

The development took place after World War II to the 1960s. Most of the homes were considered as 'vet houses". Some townhouses were built in the 1970s and early 1980s. Many of the vet homes have been demolished and turn into newer, more expensive, infill homes. Today, there are only a few vet homes left. The streets east of the Prince of Wales are Lampman, Villa, Forest Hill and Maryland.

== Features ==
The neighbourhood is home to the Ottawa Hellenic Community Centre, the Torah Academy of Ottawa, McGregor Easson Public School, which closed in 2010, St. Augustine Catholic School and Lexington Park.

Parts of the neighbourhood was originally a drive-in movie theater called Auto Sky Drive-In. It ran from 1949 until 1981. The theatre was located at Baseline at Fisher. After the theatre was dismantled, townhouses were built. The new streets were Malibu, Ambridge and Courtland.

== See also ==
- List of Ottawa neighbourhoods
- Geography of Ottawa
