= Wendy Stewart =

Ottawa City Councillor
- In office 2001–2003
- Preceded by: Jim Bickford
- Succeeded by: Maria McRae
- Constituency: River Ward

Ottawa-Carleton Regional Councillor
- In office 1994–2000
- Preceded by: George Brown
- Succeeded by: position abolished
- Constituency: River Ward

Personal details
- Born: 1952 (age 73–74) Ottawa
- Spouse: Ron Stewart (m. 1975)
- Children: 2

Wendy Stewart (née Thomas; born c. 1952) is a former Ottawa City Councillor and Ottawa-Carleton Regional Councillor. While on council, she was described as being a fiscal conservative.

Stewart was born in Ottawa, and attended South Carleton High School while living in Hazeldean, Ontario, now a suburb of Ottawa. While a student at South Carleton, she was crowned "Miss Ottawa Rough Rider" in 1970, as well as "Miss Sweetheart" at her school. During her term as Miss Ottawa Rough Rider, she endorsed Howard Henry's candidacy for the Ontario Liberal Party nomination in the 1971 provincial election in Ottawa West. A month later, Stewart finished third in the "Miss Eastern Ontario" competition.

Stewart later became a commercial artist, and married Rough Riders professional football player Ron Stewart on Valentine's Day in 1975 in Barbados. The pair moved to Ottawa's Carleton Heights neighbourhood in 1980.

Stewart was first elected to the Ottawa-Carleton Regional Council in 1994, the first year the council was elected as a separate entity, representing River Ward. Stewart had previously been quite active in the community. She had served on the board of directors of the Carleton Heights and Area Residents Association, chaired the McGregor Easson Community School Council/Advisory Committee, she was involved with the community newspaper, she was a member of the Girl Guides of Canada for 10 years, including a 5-year term as District Commissioner, she was the chair of the Rideau Valley Conservation Authority, she represented the Eastern Region of Conservation Authorities on Provincial Association's Standing Committee on Communications, and she chaired the Volunteer Advisory Committee of the Sawmill Creek Watershed Study. Stewart ran on a platform of freezing taxes for three years, cutting some discretionary social services (including "sharply (reducing) funding for arts"), and protecting urban parks and greenway corridors. Stewart easily won the election with 7215 votes to her opponent, social worker Val Parkinson's 2797.

In her first term, Stewart served as vice president of the Association of Municipalities of Ontario, and was a members of its environment committee. On regional council, she sat on three committees. In the 1997 election she ran on a platform of holding the line on taxes and being an accountable representative. Stewart was easily re-elected over her opponent, tax agent Daryl Martin 6855 votes to 1093.

When the regional government was abolished, Stewart was elected to represent the same ward on Ottawa City Council in 2000. She ran on a platform of reducing municipal spending, treating more storm water, building an artificial wetland around the Trail Road landfill, and a new police centre in her ward. She was re-elected over day-care administrator Dave Hagerman 9687 votes to 2368.

In June 2003, Stewart announced she would not be running for re-election.

As of 2013, she is living in Westport, Ontario.
