= Prince of Wales on the Rideau =

Neighbourhood in Ottawa, Ontario, Canada

Coordinates: 45.3603°N 75.6970°W

Prince of Wales on the Rideau is an affluent neighbourhood in Carleton Heights, River Ward, and Wellsmere Court in the west-end of Ottawa, Ontario, Canada. It consists of 210 homes on a peninsula between the Rideau River and Prince of Wales Drive, on the west shore of Mooney's Bay.

Prior to its development in 2006/2007, the land was part of the Moffatt Farm. The Canadian government purchased the farm in 1940 for a Veterans home. Later it was made redundant and the National Capital Commission (NCC) brought it to enlarge their parkland. It was left unattended for a number of years, until the NCC made an exchange of properties with the developer. The disposal of Crown land by the NCC resulted in many objections from the public, making it one of the most controversial new homes projects in Ottawa in recent times.

Campanale Homes is the predominant developer, purchasing 132 building lots from the city for C$13.7 million. It boasts the highest price of new construction residential land in the city, due to its closeness to the Rideau River and downtown Ottawa. In 2006, Campanale Homes boasted having the most expensive new home in Ottawa. Currently, the most inexpensive home in the neighbourhood is 1,530-square-foot (142 m^{2}) bungalow for $543,500 and the home values go up to about $3 million.

Excluding Carillon Loop, which is in a different dissemination area, the population of the neighbourhood was 585 according to the Canada 2011 Census.
