= Karin Howard =

Canadian lawyer and politician

Ottawa City Councillor
- In office December 1, 1994 – February 3, 1999
- Preceded by: George Brown
- Succeeded by: Jim Bickford
- Constituency: Mooney's Bay Ward

Personal details
- Born: Toronto
- Party: Progressive Conservative Party of Ontario

Karin (Duncan) Howard is a lawyer and politician. She represented Mooney's Bay Ward (now River Ward) on Ottawa City Council, covering the south central area of the City.

== Early life ==
Howard, born in Toronto, attended Malvern Collegiate. While completing her undergraduate degree in Biology at the University of Guelph, Howard was elected to the Biological Students Council and the University Senate. She moved to Ottawa in 1981 with her husband, where they raised three children in the Riverside Park area. Howard articled at Burke-Robertson, Chadwick & Ritchie, worked as a tax lawyer with Drache, Rotenberg, in government on the GST (Financial Institutions), and operated the business Tax Research Consultants.

== First mandate ==
In the Ottawa municipal election of 1994, Howard ran as a community representative to replace the departing George Brown, defeating six opponents. On Council she was known as "Captain Accountability" for bringing in monthly performance reports to Council, a Code of Ethics, and the independence of the City Auditor function. She instituted monthly reporting to community associations and made it her practice to attend all meetings. Howard was part of the Fiscal Five on Council, routinely holding the line on spending. She also fought to protect greenspace by serving on the Environmental Advisory Committee, protecting McCarthy Woods, the Southern Corridor of the Greenbelt, and saving the environmentally sensitive land at 4160 Riverside Drive. This land, situated at the end of the Ottawa International Airport main runway, was protected by a land swap, and kept future building heights from interfering with air traffic. Her successful motion to pay into reserve funds any extra money received by the City after the Budget, saved $1,000,000.

== Second mandate ==
Howard was re-elected in 1997, increasing her percentage of the vote from 35% to 62%, despite the strong challenge by respected school board trustee Kathy Ablett. During the municipal amalgamation discussions, Howard and Rideau Township Councillor Rob Fraser, jointly organized a televised public town hall discussion on amalgamation, and issued a report on the results. Howard brought a successful motion to support amalgamation on condition that the total budget of the new city would not be greater than the sum of the budgets of the amalgamated cities.

Howard announced in September 1998 that she would join her family in Beijing, China where her husband was newly posted with the Federal Department of Foreign Affairs and International Trade (DFAIT), now Global Affairs Canada. Instead, to ensure a balanced budget was passed, Howard stayed on Council for five extra months after her family had left. She resigned once the budget passed without a tax increase on a 6:5 vote split.

== Committees of Council and related boards ==
- Policy, Priorities and Budget
- Audit
- Planning and Economic Development
- Ottawa Public Library Board
- Riverside Hospital Board
- Central Canada Exhibition Board
- Police Services Board
- Environmental Advisory Committee
- Disability Advisory Committee.

In Beijing, Howard was elected to the local board of the Canada China Business Council for three years, and became chair of the Policy Committee. She was appointed as a trustee to the International School of Beijing and helped to build the new school at Shunyi, a USD74 million project. As policy chair, Howard revised the school policies manual. She also served business clients at the law firm Goodman, Philips, and Vineberg in their Beijing Office.

Upon returning to Ottawa in 2001, Howard organized a rally to support a free press after Russell Mills, publisher, was ostensibly fired for allowing a certain editorial to be printed in the Ottawa Citizen. For three years she managed an import business in Wellington West. During this time the City cut garbage pick-up service to businesses, which she opposed because waste removal is a basic service. In terms of corporate social responsibility, Howard committed to making a donation from her fair trade business sales to a Chinese charity and did so in 2008. The funds went to support victims of the earthquake in Sichuan, China.

Howard has taught many law courses and consulted on course development at Algonquin College and at two universities. She has been active in the community as a director on the Riverside Park Community and Recreation Association, restoring the Victoria Day Fireworks to the new Mooney's Bay site, serving on several accessibility committees, on the Ottawa Rowing Club board, and as President of the Somali Canadian Youth Centre dedicated to help youth and their families involved with the criminal justice system.

== Accountability advocacy ==
Howard has a special interest in the law of political accountability, the subject of her Masters of Law studies at Queen's University. She spoke at a 2016 conference about the lack of accountability in Ontario Liberal health care reforms that had inadequate consultation with physicians.

Howard has advocated for the rights of persons with disabilities by serving on Accessibility with Moxie Foundation, Queen's Accessibility Committee, and the City of Ottawa's Disability Advisory Committee.

== Electoral record ==
2018 Ontario general election: Ottawa South
| Party | Candidate | Votes | % | ±% |
|---|---|---|---|---|
| Liberal | John Fraser | 20,773 | 39.63 | −10.40 |
| Progressive Conservative | Karin Howard | 15,319 | 29.23 | -2.63 |
| New Democratic | Eleanor Fast | 14,250 | 27.19 | +14.82 |
| Green | Les Schram | 1,618 | 3.09 | −1.26 |
| Libertarian | Robert Daigneault | 342 | 0.65 | +0.07 |
| Communist | Larry Wasslen | 114 | 0.22 | −0.08 |
| Total valid votes | | 52,616 | 100.0 | |
| Liberal hold | | Swing | | |
Source: Elections Ontario

=== Municipal Election Results 1994 ===
Mooney's Bay Ward
| Candidate | Votes | % |
|---|---|---|
| Karin Howard | 3645 | 35.02 |
| Pat Murphy | 3025 | 29.06 |
| Fred Bowie | 1468 | 14.11 |
| Don Tudin | 1085 | 10.43 |
| Riley Brockington | 535 | 5.14 |
| Alan Murphy | 391 | 3.75 |
| Coreen Fast | 260 | 2.50 |

=== Municipal Election Results 1997 ===
Mooney's Bay Ward
| Candidate | Votes | % |
|---|---|---|
| Karin Howard | 5005 | 62.00 |
| Kathy Ablett | 3068 | 38.00 |

| Preceded by George Brown | City Councillors; 1994–1999 | Succeeded by Jim Bickford |
