= Pauline Vanier Park =

Public park in Ottawa, Canada

Coordinates: 45°22′0.5″N 75°40′31.9″W

Pauline Vanier Park is a public park in Ottawa's Riverside Park area, located on Harkness Avenue. It is named after Pauline Vanier.

The park was built in the early 1960s on what had been the Munro farm, next to neighbouring General Vanier Public School.

The Riverside Park Community and Recreation Association organized fireworks displays for over twenty years until changes in safety legislation required its removal to a larger area. Sheldon Ridgeway, then an Ottawa firefighter, started the public activity. After a six-year gap, the fireworks display was moved to Mooney's Bay in 2015.

== Facilities ==
The park has swings and play structures for children as well as a wading pool. The city of Ottawa operates and staffs the wading pool during the summer season. The pool is not fenced. It is filled during the day and supervised by lifeguards. In the evenings, the pool is drained prior to staff leaving. The park field house is used by the lifeguards as an office and to store supplies. The field house was one of six field houses built at the same time by the City of Ottawa in 1967.

The park also has two baseball diamonds with back stops, and one t-ball diamond.

In the winter, a temporary skating rink, with boards, is set up in the park. The field house is used as a change room for skaters. Volunteers from the Riverside Park Community and Recreation Association take care of the ice during the season.

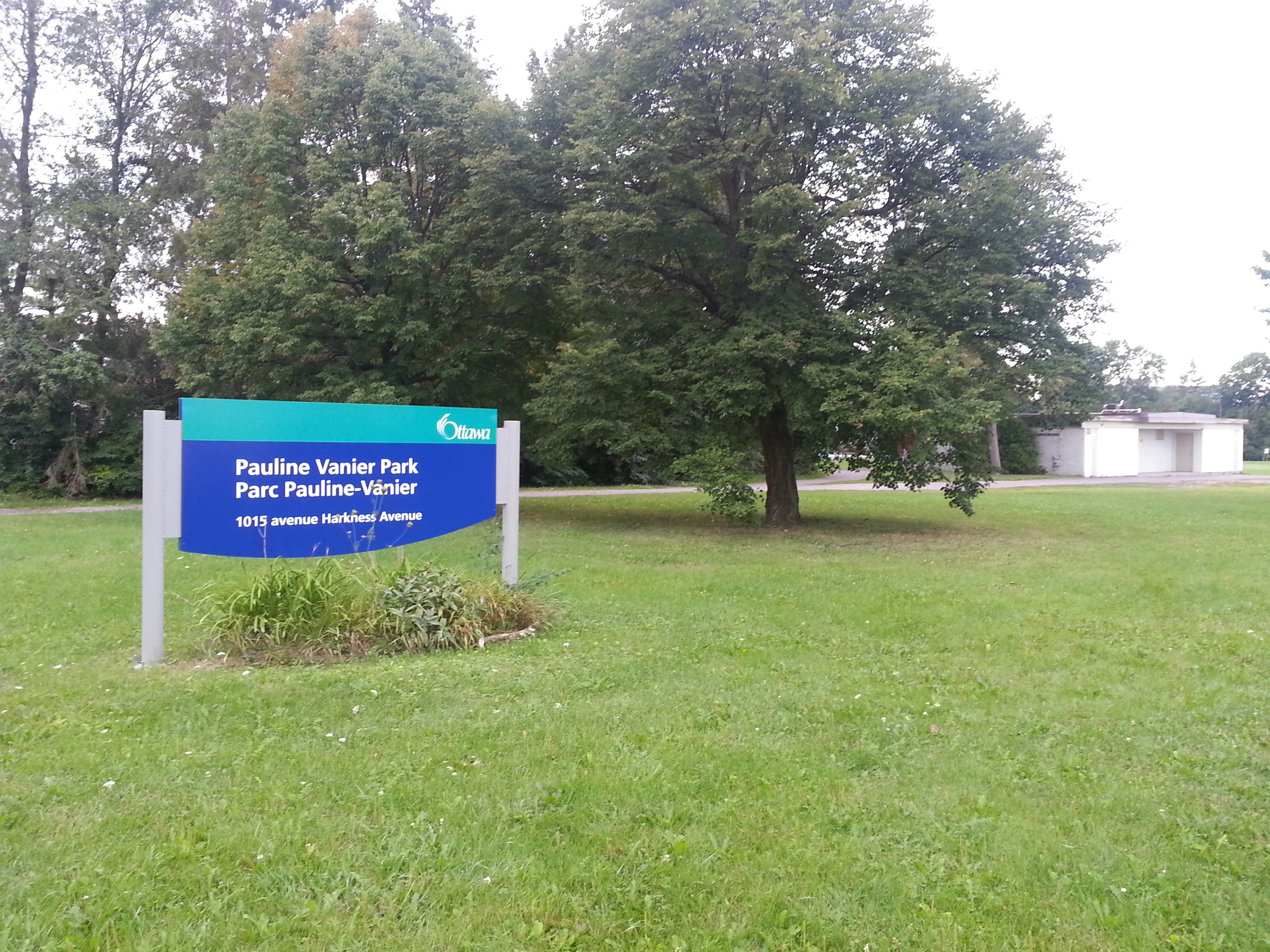
Park sign. The park pavilion can be seen in the background, to the right.

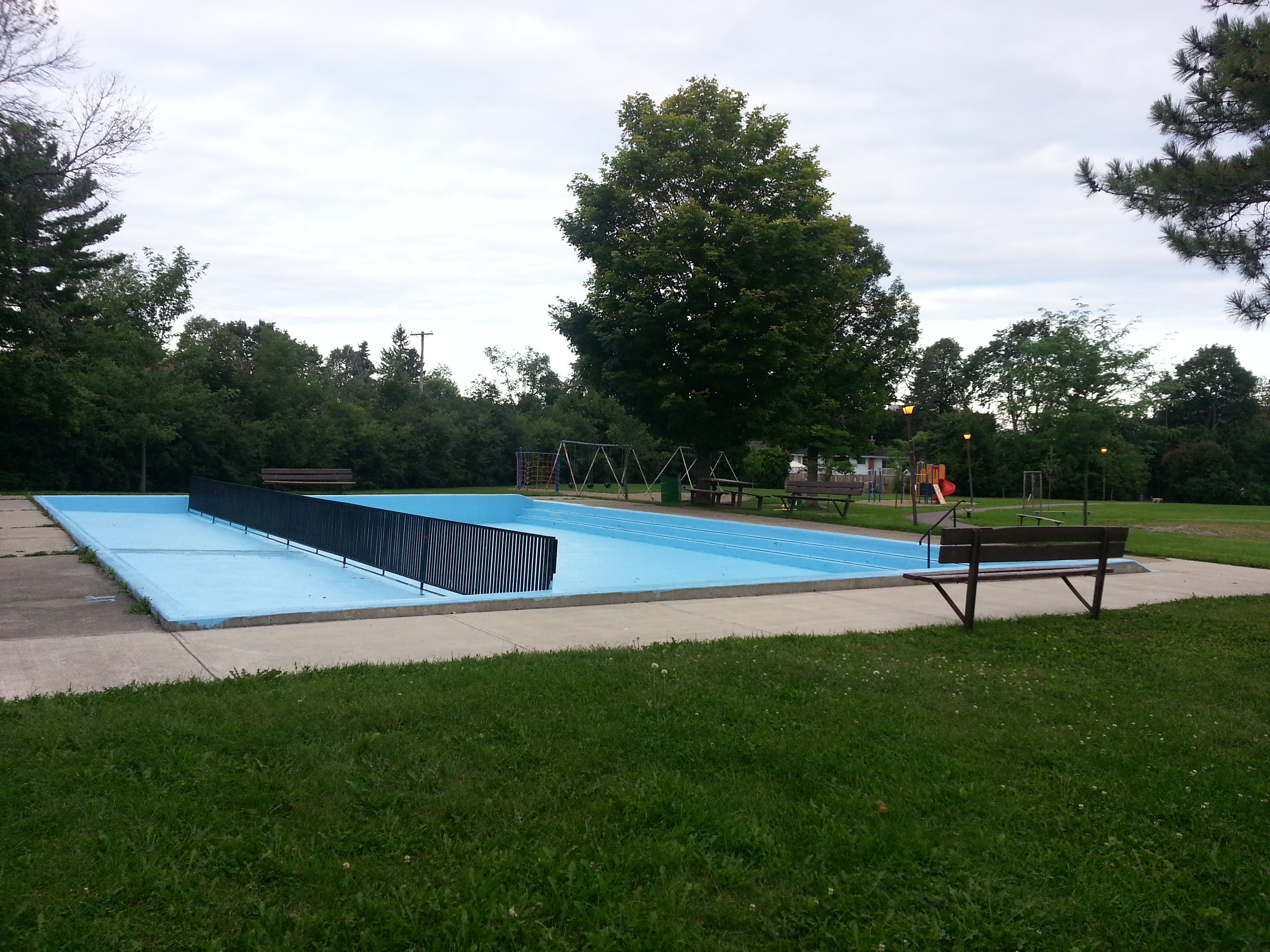
Wading pool, with swings and other amenities in the background.

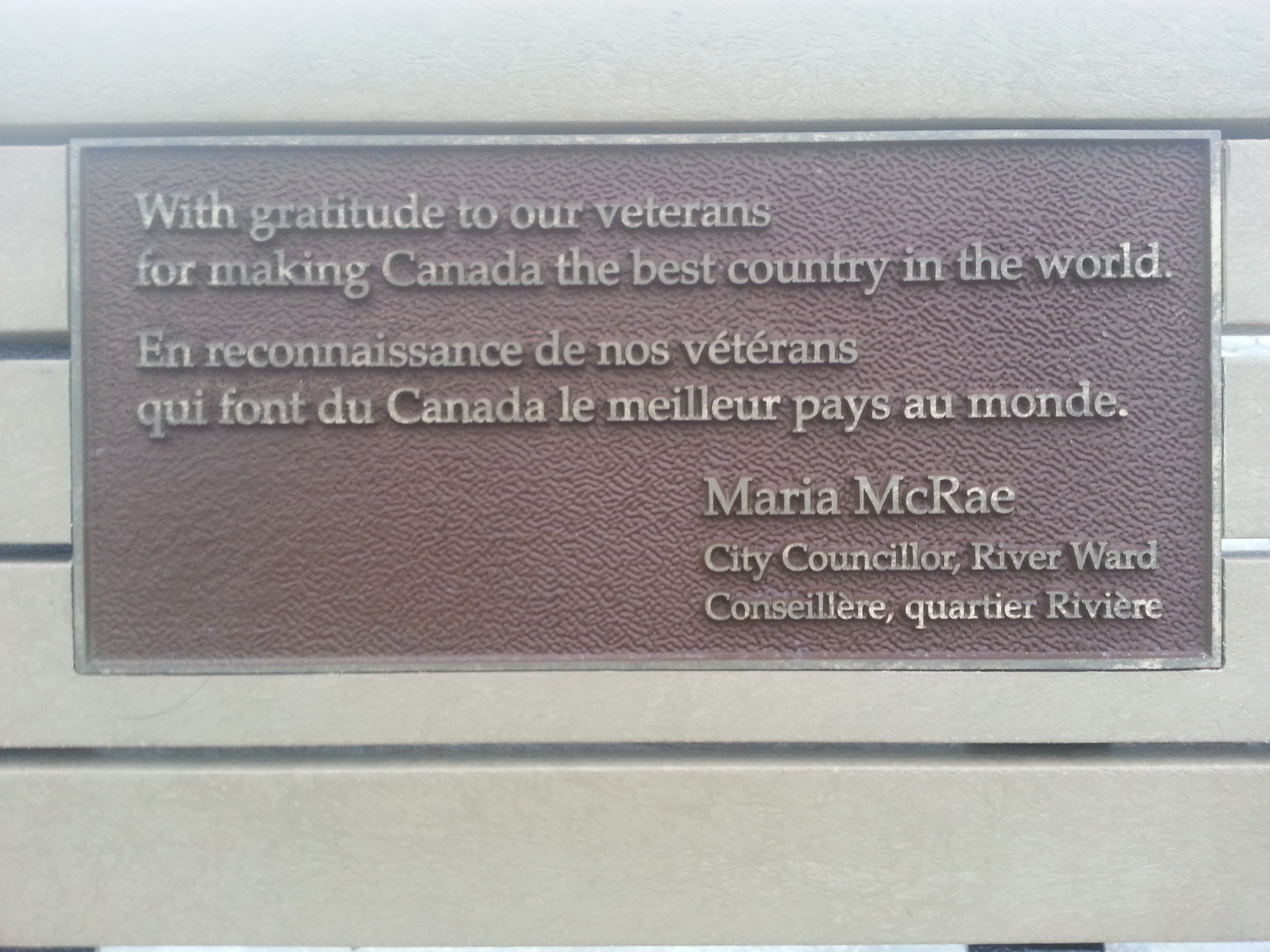
One of the benches bears a plaque thanking veterans, signed by former councillor Maria McRae.
