= Mots'eoa Senyane =

Former Lesotho High Commissioner to Canada

- Born: Mots'eoa Philadel Senyane; March 19, 1968 (age 58); Maseru, Lesotho

Mots'eoa Senyane (born March 19, 1968) is the former Lesotho High Commissioner to Canada who served from 2006 to 2009.

Motseoa has been a major contributor to the NGO field in Lesotho. For the longest time, she was the director of the Transformation Resource Centre (TRC) in Lesotho. She also was the founder of the Blue Cross Regional Resource Centre in Lesotho.

On June 7, 2006, Motseoa Senyane was appointed High Commissioner to Canada by King Letsie III.

== Service in Ottawa ==
Her first function as High Commissioner to Canada was to go to a Help Lesotho function at Shelagh M'Gonigle's house, a Help Lesotho board member. She thanked the Canadian NGO for assisting her country in developmental needs. M'e Senyane is also friends with the Executive Director of Help Lesotho, Peg Herbert.

M'e Senyane presented her credentials on September 19, 2006, to Michaëlle Jean Governor General of Canada at the Citadelle of Quebec, the Governor General's official residence in Quebec City.

M'e Senyane is the first resident high commissioner in Canada since the previous closure of the mission in 1996.

She is a major supporter of many NGO's. She is a major supporter of Help Lesotho, SOLID, an NGO in Salt Spring Island, British Columbia, and OHAfrica, an organization supported by the Ontario Health Association. She has always been a supporter for the growth of Lesotho and has gone to International AIDS Conference in Toronto, Ontario.

Ms. Senyane has made contacts with George Smitherman, the Minister of Health in Ontario. She also went to several conferences regarding the state of Africa, particularly in Lesotho from the AIDS Conference in Toronto to a conference supported by SOLID in Salt Spring Island, British Columbia. Ms. Senyane has also lectured at several universities in Canada, regarding the health and state of Lesotho.

Diplomatically, Ms. Senyane has made many friends with many Ambassadors and High Commissioners from the African region in Ottawa, Ontario. Also, Ms. Senyane appeared in a YouTube video showing the conference held in Salt Spring Island.

Her Excellency Senyane has thanked Turnbull School in Ottawa, one of the many schools twinned through Help Lesotho, for the committed and loving relationship with Sefapanong Primary School, in Lesotho, by praising Mary Ann Turnbull, the school's headmistress through a school assembly on February 14, 2008. The assembly is also featured on a YouTube video documenting the lives of two schoolgirls, both from Canada and Lesotho respectively, and how their friendship has changed both of their lives and perspectives.

Her posting concluded during the Fall of 2009 and returned to Lesotho.

Preceded by position created	Lesotho High Commissioner to Canada; 2006-2009	Succeeded by Mathabo Tsepa
