= Carleton Square =

Neighbourhood in Ottawa, Ontario, Canada

Coordinates: 45°21′54″N 75°42′37″W

Carleton Square is a sub-neighbourhood of Carleton Heights in the River Ward of Ottawa, Ontario, Canada. It is bounded on the west by Fisher Avenue, to the south Meadowlands Drive, Dynes Road to the north and Claymor Avenue to the east. According to the Canada 2011 Census the population for this area was 719.

Most of the homes are townhouses occupied by a mostly younger population.

The neighbourhood is home to St. Pius X High School. Features Dynes Park.
