= Confederation Heights =

Area in Ottawa, Canada

Coordinates: 45°22′40″N 75°41′15″W

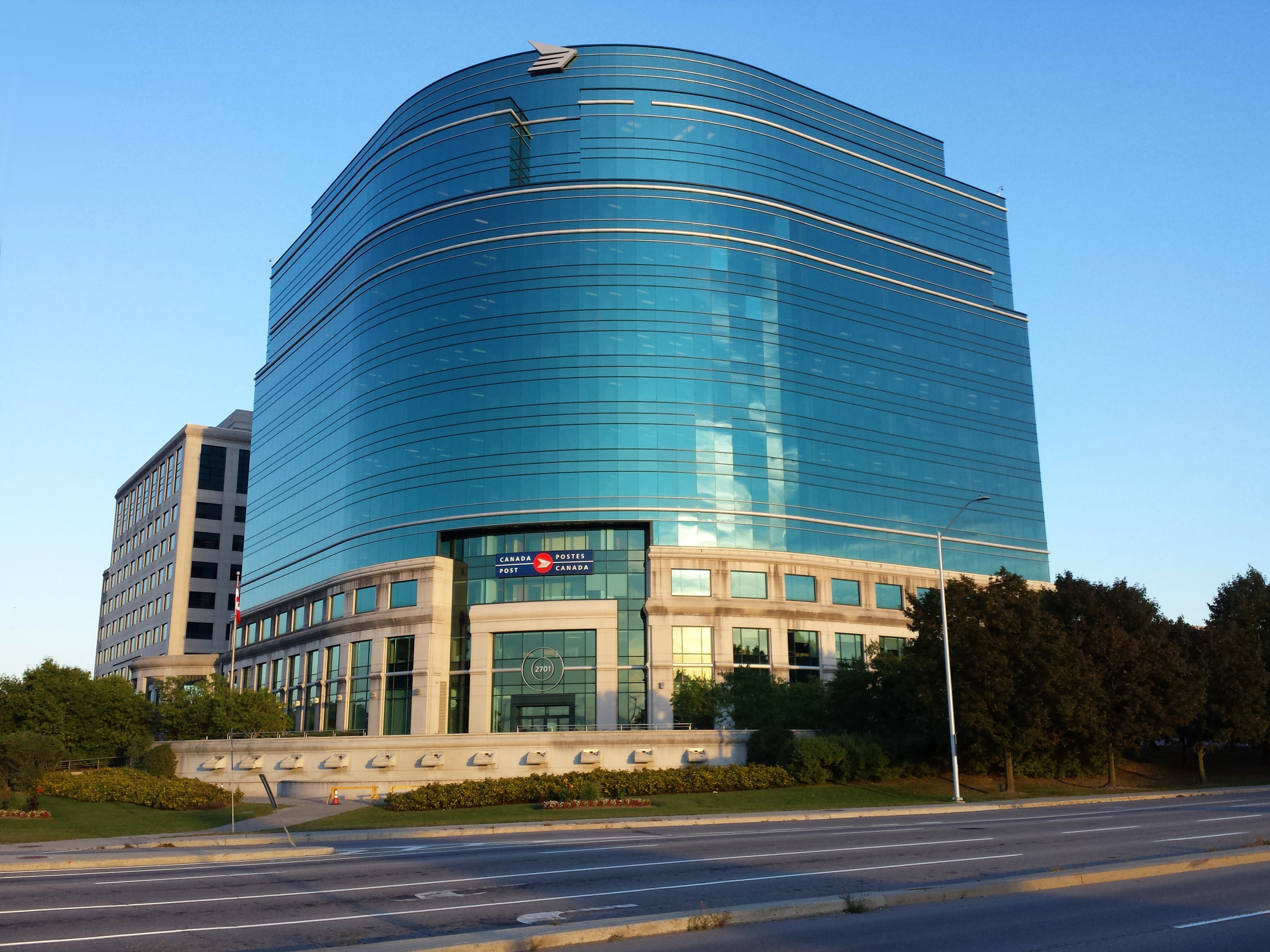
Canada Post head office at the intersection of Heron Road and Riverside Drive

Confederation Heights is an area in south Ottawa, Canada, made up of mostly government buildings. It is bounded on the east by Data Centre Road, on the north and west by the Rideau River and on the south by Brookfield Road.

Confederation Heights includes the Clarke Memorial Centre (RA Centre), the Taxation Data Centre (Canada Revenue Agency), 1500 Bronson Avenue (formerly Canadian Broadcasting Corporation and Communications Security Establishment's Edward Drake Building), the Sir Leonard Tilley Building (formerly Communications Security Establishment), Canada Post Place (Canada Post headquarters), the Sir Charles Tupper Building (Public Works Canada), Hog's Back Park, Vincent Massey Park and Mooney's Bay station.

== History ==
Prior to the expropriation of the Merkley Brick Yard in 1954, the area had been a combination of woods, farmland, quarry and brickyard. The arrival of Federal government departments in the late 1950s - early 1960s had a significant impact on the area. In 1959, the Fire Chief of Gloucester Township (the area was incorporated into Ottawa the following year) raised concerns that road traffic caused by the 1400 new workers commuting to Confederation Heights would interfere with the firefighters' ability to respond to fires from their station in Billings Bridge. It was estimated that daily traffic on Riverside Drive west of Bank Street would increase by 3500 cars.

In 1961, Prime Minister John Diefenbaker inaugurated the Sir Alexander Campbell Building, the new headquarters building of the Department of the Post Office. The building, designed by architects Shore and Moffat was one of three which anchored the site. A plaza, with fountains and benches, spread between the self-standing cafeteria building and the Sir Alexander Campbell Building. To commemorate Canada's Centennial, a sundial was installed on the plaza. The plaque attached to its base read "Erected by Headquarters Staff of the Post Office Department to Commemorate the Centennial of Confederation July 26, 1967". The fountains and sundial have since disappeared. The Sir Alexander Campbell Building has since been torn down. It was replaced by a new Canada Post headquarters building located in Confederation Heights at the corner of Riverside Drive and Heron Road.

The Sir Charles Tupper Building, which serves as the headquarters of the Department of Public Works and Government Services, opened in 1960 (Lithwick, Lambert and Sim Architects) It was the second prominent building located in Confederation Heights. The third was the Sir Leonard Tilley Building, which served as the headquarters of the Communications Security Establishment until a new headquarters building was built in the eastern end of Ottawa on Ogilvie Road. Plans to move various other departments to Confederation Heights changed over time. For example, it had been suggested that the Department of Indian Affairs and Northern Development move to Confederation Heights, but this never occurred.

The development of offices also drove the development of neighbourhoods and infrastructure (e.g.: Brookfield HS, opened 1962; General Vanier PS, opened 1963) in nearby Billings Bridge, Riverside Park, and Carleton Heights.
