= List of high commissioners of Lesotho to Canada =

The Lesotho High Commission in Canada was opened on 2 September 1975 with accreditation Acting High Commissioner Joseph Lekhooa Masithela.Lesotho closed its High Commission in Ottawa in December 1996, and reopened in April 2006.

Name	Period	Function	Note
Mothusi Thamsanqa Mashlogy	1970–1974	High Commissioner	Accredited on 22 January 1970 (Resident in Washington D.C.)
Gonzalo Konka Malopo	1973–1974	Acting High Commissioner	Accredited on 24 June 1973 (Resident in Washington D.C.)
Ephraim Tsepa Manare	1974–1975	High Commissioner	Accredited on 6 February 1974 (Resident in Washington D.C.)
M. Teboho J. Mashologu	1975–1976	High Commissioner	Accredited on 4 November 1975 (Resident in Washington D.C.)
Joseph Lekhooa Masithela	1975–1976	Acting High Commissioner	Accredited on 2 September 1975
Joseph Kaibe Mollo	1976–1980	High Commissioner	Accredited on 1 September 1976
Mothusi Thamsanga Mashologu	1980–1985	High Commissioner	Accredited on 3 October 1980
Tseliso Thamae	1985–1986	High Commissioner	Accredited on 12 March 1985
Bereng Augustinus Sekhonyana	1986–1988	High Commissioner	Accredited on 31 July 1986
Rafael Ramaliehe Kali	1988–1992	High Commissioner	Accredited on 5 October 1988
Nehemia Sekhonyana Bereng	1992–1994	High Commissioner	Accredited on 24 March 1992
Boomo Frank Sofonia	1994–1995	Acting High Commissioner	Accredited in November 1994
Gwendoline Mphokho Malahleha	1995–1996	High Commissioner	Accredited on 16 May 1995
Eunice Malephiri Bulane	1998–2001	High Commissioner	Accredited on 5 February 1998 (Resident in Washington D.C.)
Molelekeng Ernestina Rapolaki	2002–2006	High Commissioner	Accredited on 27 February 2002(Resident in Washington D.C.)
Tumelo Ephraim Raboletsi	2006	Acting High Commissioner	Accredited in April 2006
Khosi Mpho Malie	2006	Acting High Commissioner	Accredited in June 2006
Motseoa Philadel Senyane	2006–2009	High Commissioner	Accredited on 19 September 2006-18 September 2009
Moshe Neo Kao	2009–2010	Acting High Commissioner	Accredited on 19 September 2009-22 September 2010
Mathabo Theresia Tsepa	2010–2016	High Commissioner	Accredited on 23 September 2010-25 October 2016
Liteboho Kutloano Mahlakeng	2016–2018	Acting High Commissioner	Accredited on 26 October 2016-4 September 2018
Boomo Frank Sofonia	2018–2019	High Commissioner	Accredited on 5 September 2018
Ralechate Lincoln Mokose	2019–2020	High Commissioner	Accredited on 9 July 2019
Molebatseng Lydiah Makhata	2020–2021	Acting High Commissioner	Accredited in November 2020
Molise Paul Tseole	2021–2024	High Commissioner	Accredited on 3 November 2021
Lereko Felix Maine	2024–2025	Acting High Commissioner	Accredited in May 2024
Malehlanye Constantinus Ralejoe	2025-Present	High Commissioner	Accredited on 15 January 2025
