= Carlington =

- Neighbourhood
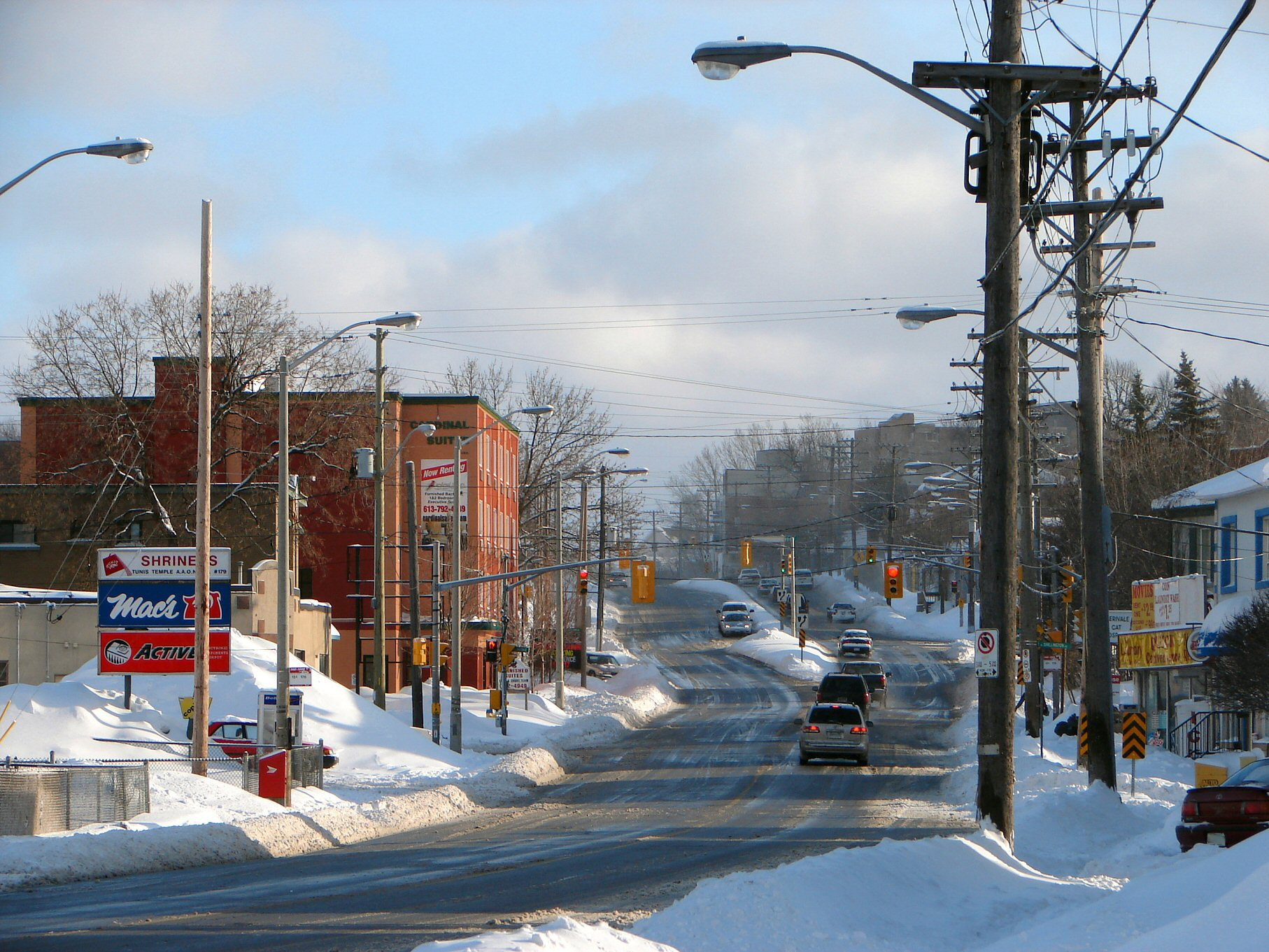
- Merivale Road goes through the centre of Carlington.

- Location of Carlington within the city of Ottawa
- Coordinates: 45°22′40″N 75°44′00″W
- Country: Canada
- Province: Ontario
- City: Ottawa

Government
  - MPs: Anita Vandenbeld
  - MPPs: Catherine McKenney, Chandra Pasma
  - Councillors: Riley Brockington
  - Governing body: Carlington Community Association
  - President: Charity Bartlett

Area
  - Total: 3.26 km^{2} (1.26 sq mi)
- Elevation: 80 m (260 ft)

Population (Canada 2016 Census)
  - Total: 11,363
  - Density: 3,490/km^{2} (9,030/sq mi)
- Time zone: Eastern (EST)
- Forward sortation area: K1Z

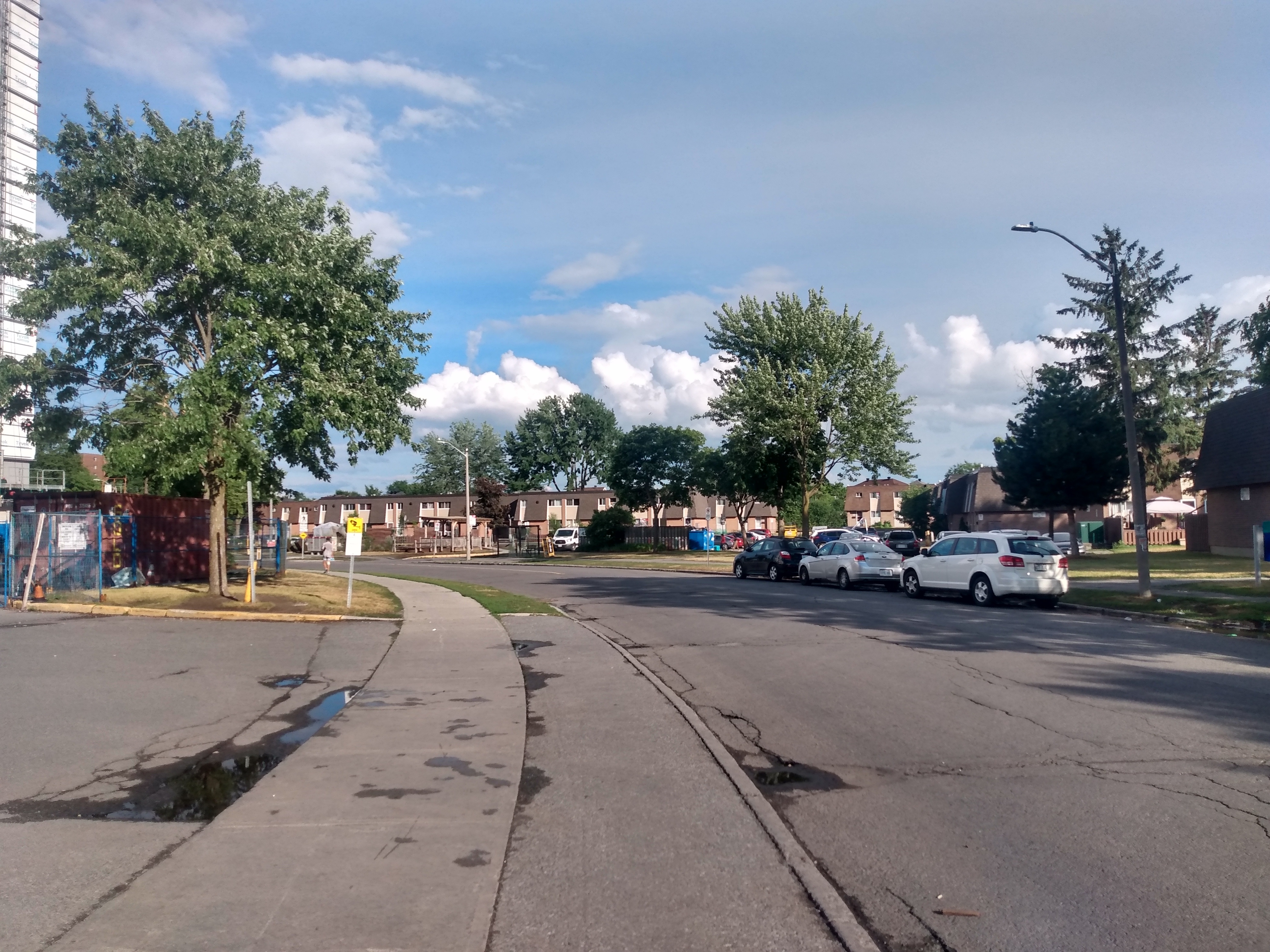
Caldwell Avenue

Carlington is a neighbourhood located in River Ward in the west-end of Ottawa, Ontario, Canada.

The community association boundaries are Clyde Avenue to the west, Carling Avenue and the Queensway to the north, Fisher Avenue to the east and the Central Experimental Farm Pathway to the south. According to the Canada 2016 Census, the total population for this area was 11,363.

Carlington was first settled in the early 1920s. It contains less than 435 older pre-1945 homes. Some 2,000 dwellings were built from 1945 to 1960. The houses built in the time period immediately following World War II were meant for returning veterans and are therefore known as "war homes" or "veteran homes". Many of the street names in the neighbourhood also reflect this military heritage (e.g. Viscount Ave, Admiral Ave, General Ave, Marshall Ave, Veteran Ave, Crerar Ave.). From 1961 to 1970, 1,440 homes and apartments were built and from 1971 to 1980, another 1,380. After 1981, the construction of new dwellings sharply dropped to less than 400 for the remainder of the 20th century. Today there are new homes being built as some veterans' homes are demolished.

The neighbourhood is home to Westgate Shopping Centre and the Royal Ottawa Hospital. Merivale Road is Carlington's traditional main street and goes through the centre of residential Carlington. There are five places of worship: St. Elizabeth's of the Visitation Roman Catholic Church, Église Catholique Romain de Saint-Bonaventure, Church of God of Prophecy, Kehillat Beth Israel synagogue and St Tekle Haimanot Ethiopian Orthodox Tewahedo Church, the only Ethiopian Orthodox church in Ottawa.

The Carlington Business Area is west of Kirkwood, north of Carlington Hill, south of the Queensway (417), and east of Maitland. The main business streets are Laperierre and Woodward.

== Carlington Hill ==
A notable geographic feature in the neighbourhood is Carlington Hill, a large hill with long gradual slopes. Part of it was formerly a ski hill with tow lift (known as Anne Heggtveit Hill), but now used as a City of Ottawa approved sledding hill. The western part of the hill was quarried for limestone, which was crushed and used as lime for the production of cement. The former quarry is now used as a city snow dump. Also, on top of the hill is the Carlington Heights Reservoir and Pump Station which supplies approximately one third of the City's water.

== Demographics ==
Population trend:

- Population in 2011: 11,882
- Population in 2006: 11,512
- Population in 2001: 12,585

Private dwellings occupied by usual residents: 5,438 (total dwellings: 5,771)

Carlington is home to a diverse range of cultures including Asian, African, European and Middle Eastern communities. As of the 2006 census 29% of residents were immigrants within the last ten years, with 28% of those from Europe, 27% from Asia or the Middle East, 27% from Africa, 13% from South and Central America, 9% from the Caribbean, and 3% from the United States.

In terms of knowledge of official languages, 67% of Carlington residents reported that they could speak or understand English only, 1.6% reported that they could speak or understand French only, 29% reported that they could speak or understand both English and French, and 1.9% reported that they knew neither. 14.5% of residents reported that the language spoken most often at home was neither English nor French.

== Recreation ==
Two community centres are located in the neighbourhood; Alexander Community Centre, and Bellevue Community Centre (Carlington Recreation Centre).

The major park in the neighbourhood is Carlington Park which includes, in addition to the Carlington Sledding Hill, the J. Alph Dulude Arena and four baseball diamonds. There are five other parks in Carlington; Bellevue Manor, Alexander, Harrold Place, Meadowvale Terrace and Raven Park (John Smith Field).

The neighbourhood is bordered to the south by the Experimental Farm bike path, which connects to the Pinecrest Creek Pathway to the west, and to the Rideau Canal West pathway to the east. This path is maintained by the National Capital Commission.

== Schools ==
- W.E. Gowling Public School - English and French Immersion public elementary school (Ottawa-Carleton District School Board)
- Saint Elizabeth School - English Roman Catholic elementary school (Ottawa Catholic School Board)
- St. Nicholas Adult High School - adult high school (Ottawa Catholic School Board)
- Turnbull School and Learning Centre (private school)
