= Rideauview =

Neighbourhood in Ottawa, Ontario, Canada

Rideauview Rideau View
- Neighbourhood
- Rideauview
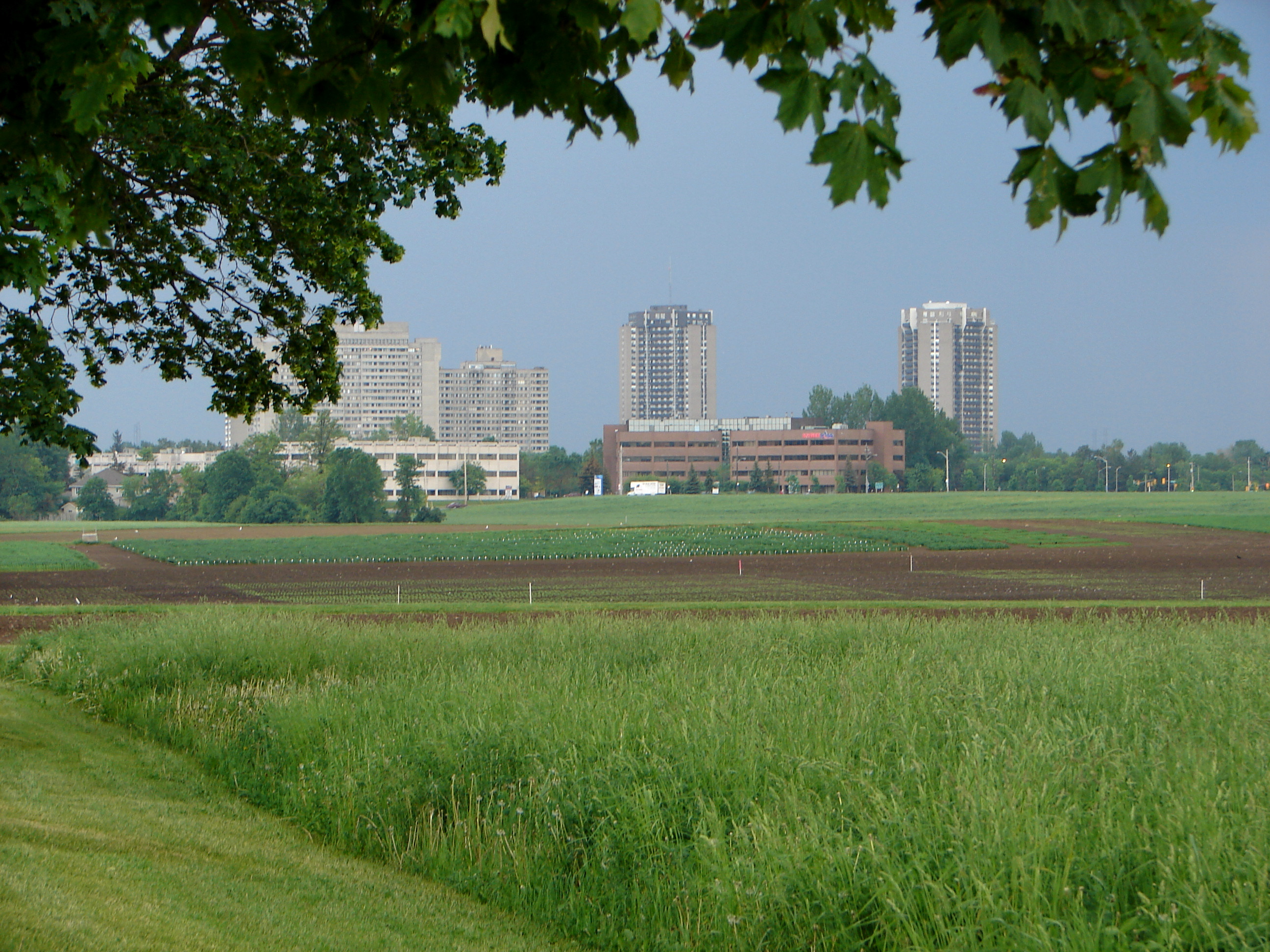
- Residential high-rise buildings of Rideau View, as seen across the Central Experimental Farm
- Interactive map of Rideauview
- Coordinates: 45°22′0″N 75°42′23″W
- Country: Canada
- Province: Ontario
- City: Ottawa
- Ward: River Ward

Rideauview (also spelled Rideau View) is a sub-neighbourhood of Carleton Heights in River Ward, in the west-end of Ottawa, Ontario, Canada, located near the Rideau River. It is bordered by Meadowlands Drive to the south, Claymor Avenue to the west and Dynes Road to the north. Debra Avenue is the main road that runs through the neighbourhood and there is some residential housing on Eiffel Avenue. Some of parts of the neighbourhoods are east of Prince of Wales Drive and runs parallel along the Rideau River. The area is also located close to the former city of Nepean. A major feature of the neighbourhood is a low-income housing project designed and built by the Ottawa Housing corporation. There are four high-rise condominiums on Prince of Wales at the corner of Dynes and Meadowlands.

The population of this neighbourhood according to the Canada 2011 Census was 1880.

The area is home to a diverse population of Black, Asian, Eastern European, and Arab residents. Most people in the neighbourhood live under the poverty line and there is some crime in the area. A crime wave hit the area in the late 1980s and early 1990s when the neighbourhood was notorious for gun violence and drug trafficking. To prevent the neighbourhood from becoming plagued by crime, the police chief held a meeting with city officials to discuss options for decreasing crime in the neighbourhood. An increased police presence and undercover operations helped to reduce crime in the area and today the area is somewhat stable. A youth centre was opened by the Ottawa Police Service to provide alternatives for the youth to help them stay away from resorting to a life of crime and violence. The Debra-Dynes family house was opened as a community outreach centre and is located in the heart of the neighbourhood.

The Greek Festival is held every August at the Greek Orthodox Church on Prince of Wales.

It is home to Rideauview Bible Church, a Greek Orthodox church, the Ukrainian Catholic Shrine and Temple Israel (a Synagogue).

The schools that serve the neighbourhood are Brookfield High School, Carleton Heights Elementary School, St.Pius X High School and Carleton University.
