= Donna Upson =

Canadian white supremacist (born 1978)

- Born: 1977 or 1978 (age 48–49)

Donna Marie Upson (born 1978) is a Canadian white supremacist who ran for the office of mayor of Ottawa, Ontario, Canada in the 2003 municipal election.

In July 2000, Upson, known within the Ku Klux Klan (KKK) as "Baby Hitler", with several previous convictions for hate-related offences, was sentenced to two years in prison for threatening the pastor of a predominantly black Dartmouth, Nova Scotia, congregation. The judge stated that Upson had come to Nova Scotia on a mission to rid churches of blacks, and she was described as a "card-carrying member of the KKK, Aryan Nations, and the Nationalist Party".

She appealed her three convictions, and, in May 2001, the Nova Scotia Court of Appeal reversed two of them, and she was then released from prison. She was re-arrested a few days later, on an Amherst warrant, to face assault charges stemming from incidents while she was incarcerated; she was then released on bail.

In July 2003, there was wide coverage in Canadian media that Upson had filed as a candidate for mayor of Ottawa. During the campaign, she received contributions from the KKK, and she voiced support for racial segregation. She had also set up a Canadian branch of the National Socialist Movement. A week after the original coverage, it was reported that there were three outstanding arrest warrants for Upson from Nova Scotia, two for assault and one for failure to appear.

Arrested in October for breach of probation, she remained on the ballot for the November 10, 2003 election and finished sixth, with 1,312 votes (0.71%), considered a "startling number".

== Electoral record ==
2003 Ottawa municipal election: Mayor
Party	Candidate	Votes	%	±%
Independent	Bob Chiarelli	104,595	56.53	+0.21
Independent	Terry Kilrea	66,634	36.02	-
Independent	Ike Awgu	5,394	2.92	-
Independent	Ron Burke	2,698	1.46	-
Independent	John A. Bell	2,027	1.10	-
Independent	Donna Upson	1,312	0.71	-
Independent	Paula Nemchin	1,191	0.64	+0.36
Independent	John Turmel	1,166	0.63	+0.36
Total valid votes		185,017		
