= 2003 Ottawa municipal election =

Election in Ontario, Canada

2003 Ottawa mayoral election
- November 10, 2003
- Turnout: ~33%
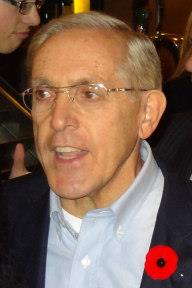
Candidate	Bob Chiarelli	Terry Kilrea
Popular vote	104,595	66,634
Percentage	56.53%	36.02%
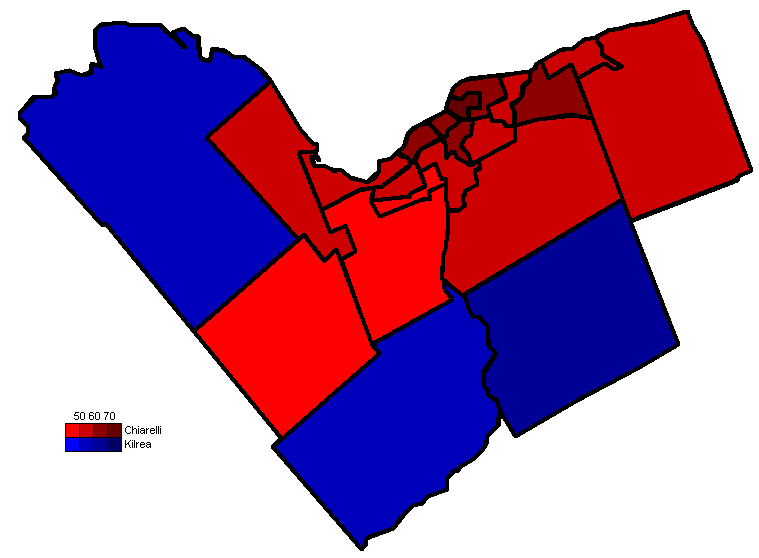
- Popular vote results by Ward
Mayor before election
Bob Chiarelli
Elected mayor
Bob Chiarelli

The 2003 Ottawa municipal election was a municipal election that was held in Ottawa to elect the city's mayor, City Council, and school trustees for the city of Ottawa, Ontario, Canada. The vote was held on November 10, 2003. The elections were held simultaneously with most other municipalities in Ontario.

The mayoral election was won by popular incumbent and former Liberal Member of Provincial Parliament Bob Chiarelli. His main competition was that of right-wing candidate Terry Kilrea.

== Issues ==
The main issues of the race were a controversial Smoking ban, the expansion of the O-Train (Ottawa's light rail system), official bilingualism and the recent amalgamation. Chiarelli was in favour of the smoking ban, which had been implemented by the last city council. The ban was on smoking in all public places, which angered many bar and restaurant owners. Kilrea was against the smoking ban. He was also against putting money into expanding the O-Train, and official bilingualism in the city.

== Controversy ==
One of the prominent fringe candidates for mayor was associated with white supremacist support. Donna Upson received contributions from the Ku Klux Klan, and she voiced support for racial segregation. She has also set up a Canadian branch of the National Socialist Movement. She finished in sixth place with 1,312 votes (0.71%).

== Turnout ==
Turnout for the election was low, at 33%. The highest turnouts were in the rural areas, specifically in Goulbourn, Rideau and the highest West Carleton (45%). The lowest turnout was in Somerset Ward at 25% turnout.

== Results for mayor ==
2003 Ottawa municipal election: Mayor
Party	Candidate	Votes	%	±%
Independent	Bob Chiarelli	104,595	56.53	+0.21
Independent	Terry Kilrea	66,634	36.02	-
Independent	Ike Awgu	5,394	2.92	-
Independent	Ron Burke	2,698	1.46	-
Independent	John A. Bell	2,027	1.10	-
Independent	Donna Upson	1,312	0.71	-
Independent	Paula Nemchin	1,191	0.64	+0.36
Independent	John Turmel	1,166	0.63	+0.36
Total valid votes		185,017		

Chiarelli won all but three wards and had his most strength in the city core region. Kilrea won three wards, all in the rural south and west.

== Council results ==
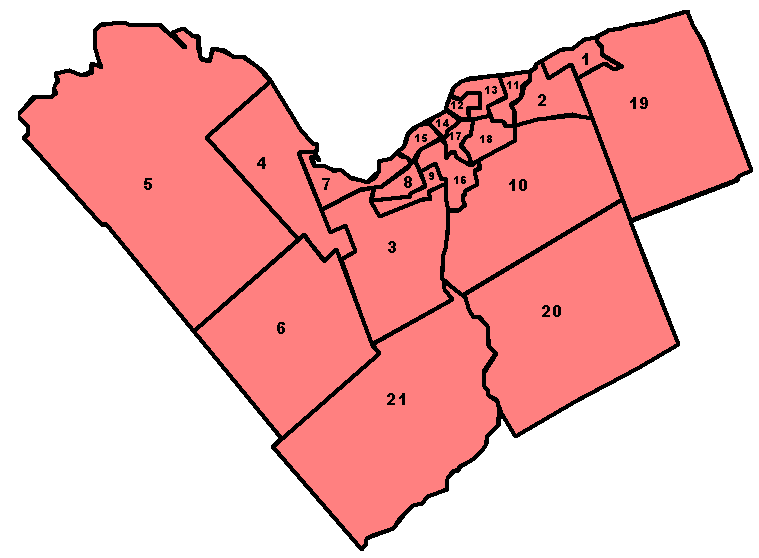
Map of Ottawa's Wards used in this election: 1. Orléans Ward; 2. Innes Ward; 3. Bell-South Nepean Ward; 4. Kanata Ward; 5. West Carleton Ward; 6. Goulbourn Ward; 7. Bay Ward; 8. Baseline Ward; 9. Knoxdale-Merivale Ward; 10. Gloucester-Southgate Ward; 11. Beacon Hill-Cyrville Ward; 12. Rideau-Vanier Ward; 13. Rideau-Rockcliffe Ward; 14. Somerset Ward; 15. Kitchissippi Ward; 16. River Ward; 17. Capital Ward; 18. Alta Vista Ward; 19. Cumberland Ward; 20. Osgoode Ward; 21. Rideau Ward.

No incumbents lost any races, and only two councillors had a decrease in the popular vote percentage from the 2000 election.

Orléans Ward

1. Herb Kreling 7,182 (72.89%) (+31.93%)
2. Louise Malloy 2,671 (27.11%)

Innes Ward

1. Rainer Bloess 5,925 (59.26%) (+7.25%)
2. J.-F. Claude 4,073 (40.74%)

Bell-South Nepean Ward

1. Jan Harder 11,678 (86.75%) (+25.86%)
2. John R. Palmer 1,784 (13.25%)

Kanata Ward

1. Peggy Feltmate 12,260 (70.58%)
2. Richard Rutkowski 4,166 (23.98%)
3. Donald Leafloor 561 (3.23%)
4. Grant Johnston 384 (2.21%)

West Carleton Ward

1. Eli El-Chantiry 2,738 (44.61%)
2. Adele Muldoon 2,709 (44.14%)
3. Daryl W. Craig 480 (7.82%)
4. Jim Jenkins 210 (3.42%)

Goulbourn Ward

1. Janet Stavinga 5,076 (64.15%) (+19.14%)
2. Michael P. O'Rourke 2,837 (35.85%)

Bay Ward

1. Alex Cullen 6,713 (56.74%) (+8.72%)
2. John Blatherwick 4,477 (37.84%)
3. Don Rivington 394 (3.33%)
4. Didar Mohamed 248 (2.10%)

Baseline Ward

1. Rick Chiarelli (acclaimed)

Knoxdale-Merivale Ward

1. Gord Hunter 7,029 (84.79%) (+13.17%)
2. Phillip Unhola 637 (7.68%)
3. Al Speyers 624 (7.53%) (-20.85%)

Gloucester-Southgate Ward

1. Diane Deans 6,166 (59.34%) (+10.64%)
2. Harold G. Keenan 3,917 (37.70%)
3. David Lamothe 308 (2.96%)

Beacon Hill-Cyrville Ward

1. Michel Bellemare 4,613 (61.04%) (+3.17%)
2. Frank Reid 2,812 (37.21%)
3. Osman Abdi 132 (1.75%)

Rideau-Vanier Ward

1. Georges Bédard 3,631 (41.52%)
2. Bruce McConville 2,355 (26.93%)
3. Angela Rickman 1,829 (20.91%)
4. Giacomo Vigna 582 (6.66%)
5. Abdillahi Omar Bouh 211 (2.41%)
6. Natasha Duckworth 137 (1.57%)

Rideau-Rockcliffe Ward

1. Jacques Legendre 6,070 (79.17%) (+15.29%)
2. James Parker 934 (12.18%)
3. Michel Binda 663 (8.65%)

Somerset Ward

1. Diane Holmes 4,105 (61.62%)
2. Dawn Pickering 1,195 (17.94%)
3. David MacDonald 567 (8.51%)
4. William A. Ostapyk 366 (5.49%)
5. Steve Sweeney 189 (2.84%)
6. Sotos Petrides 132 (1.98%)
7. Bill Driver 55 (0.83%)
8. Mike Jung 53 (0.80%)

Kitchissippi Ward

1. Shawn Little 2,907 (27.12%) (-19.92%)
2. Kris Klein 2,330 (21.74%)
3. Gary Ludington 2,217 (20.68%)
4. Linda Davis 1,540 (14.37%) (-26.07%)
5. Daniel Stringer 1,058 (9.87%)
6. David McConnell 625 (5.83%)
7. Les Gangé 42 (0.39%)

River Ward

1. Maria McRae 5,600 (63.11%)
2. Todd Mattila-Hartman 1,654 (18.64%)
3. Richard Smith 1,619 (18.25%)

Capital Ward

1. Clive Doucet 5,785 (80.06%) (+9.67%)
2. C.R.L. Erickson 1,024 (14.17%)
3. Mike Salmon 417 (5.77%)

Alta Vista Ward

1. Peter Hume (acclaimed)

Cumberland Ward

1. Rob Jellett 2,957 (54.37%)
2. Garry Lowe 1,871 (34.40%)
3. Pierre E. Doucette 552 (10.15%)
4. David Whissell 59 (1.08%)

Osgoode Ward

1. Doug Thompson (acclaimed)

Rideau Ward

1. Glenn Brooks 2,765 (62.68%) (-2.42%)
2. Paul Paton 1,646 (37.32%)

== School trustee races ==
=== Ottawa-Carleton District School Board Trustees ===
Zone 1
Candidate	Votes	%
Lynn Scott (X)	9,143	68.56
Marco D'Angelo	4,192	31.44

Zone 2
Candidate	Votes	%
Jim Libbey (X)	7,524	65.44
Mark Williams	3,974	34.56

Zone 3
Candidate	Votes	%
Norm MacDonald (X)	4,549	58.16
Sean Casey	2,634	33.67
David Burkitt	639	8.17

Zone 4
Candidate	Votes	%
Margaret Lange (X)	5,324	66.17
George Dawson	2,722	33.83

Zone 5
Candidate	Votes	%
Alex Getty	6,009	51.90
Myrna Laurenceson (X)	5,570	48.10

Zone 6
Candidate	Votes	%
Bronwyn Funiciello	4,969	53.62
Russ Jackson (X)	4,298	46.38

Zone 7
Candidate	Votes	%
Greg Laws	4,146	50.80
Tom Connolly	4,016	49.20

Zone 8 (Wards 1, 19)
Candidate	Votes	%
Sheryl MacDonald (X)	Acclaimed	

Zone 9
Candidate	Votes	%
Lynn Graham (X)	Acclaimed	

Zone 10
Candidate	Votes	%
Joan Spice (X)	Acclaimed	

Zone 11
Candidate	Votes	%
Riley Brockington	2,274	41.22
Marita Moll	1,894	34.33
Patty Anne Hill	1,349	24.45

Zone 12
Candidate	Votes	%
David Moen (X)	Acclaimed	

=== Ottawa-Carleton Catholic School Board Trustees ===
Zone 1
Candidate	Votes	%
John Curry (X)	2,945	66.39
David Burke	1,491	33.61

Zone 2
Candidate	Votes	%
Arthur J. M. Lamarche (X)	Acclaimed	

Zone 3
Candidate	Votes	%
Des Curley (X)	Acclaimed	

Zone 4
Candidate	Votes	%
June Flynn-Turner (X)	2,588	67.22
Angelo Filoso	1,262	32.78

Zone 5
Candidate	Votes	%
Jacqueline Legendre-McGuinty (X)	Acclaimed	

Zone 6
Candidate	Votes	%
Gord Butler (X)	2,309	55.68
John Chiarelli	1,838	44.32

Zone 7
Candidate	Votes	%
Betty-Ann Kealey (X)	2,925	76.33
Joseph Paul	907	23.67

Zone 8
Candidate	Votes	%
Mark Mullan (X)	2,555	59.56
Pat Bowie	1,735	40.44

Zone 9
Candidate	Votes	%
Kathy Ablett (X)	Acclaimed	

Zone 10
Candidate	Votes	%
Thérèse Maloney Cousineau (X)	Acclaimed	

=== Conseil des écoles catholiques de langue française du Centre-Est Trustees ===
Zone 4
Candidate	Votes	%
Marie Biron (X)	Acclaimed	

Zone 5
Candidate	Votes	%
Jocelyn Bourdon	Acclaimed	

Zone 6
Candidate	Votes	%
Diane Doré	1,862	57.77
Diane Lemieux-Trudel (X)	956	29.66
Jean-Jacques Desgranges	405	12.57

Zone 7
Candidate	Votes	%
Monique Briand (X)	Acclaimed	

Zone 8
Candidate	Votes	%
Lise Cloutier (X)	Acclaimed	

Zone 9
Candidate	Votes	%
Madelaine Chevalier (X)	Acclaimed	

Zone 10
Candidate	Votes	%
Robert Tremblay	Acclaimed	

Zone 11
Candidate	Votes	%
Brian Beauchamp	Acclaimed	

=== Conseil des écoles publiques de l'Est de l'Ontario Trustees ===
Zone 6
Candidate	Votes	%
Louise Panneton (X)	694	84.63
Jama Y. Khabar	126	15.37

Zone 7
Candidate	Votes	%
Jean-Philippe Caron (X)	Acclaimed	

Zone 8
Candidate	Votes	%
Chantal Lecours	760	57.84
Denis M. Chartrand (X)	515	39.19
Mohamed Meigag	39	2.97

Zone 9
Candidate	Votes	%
Marielle Godbout (X)	669	80.41
Said Hussein	163	19.59

Zone 10
Candidate	Votes	%
Susan R. Copeland (X)	743	71.65
Abdurahman H. Ali	294	28.35

Zone 11
Candidate	Votes	%
Jean-Paul Lafond (X)	754	76.08
Ahmed Muse	237	23.92

Zone 12 (Wards 3-9, 21-23)
Candidate	Votes	%
Bernard Bareilhe	483	64.40
Samira Mohamed Dirié	267	35.60

== Information on the candidates ==
- Giacomo Vigna (Rideau-Vanier ward) is a lawyer with the Canadian Human Rights Commission. He was a candidate in the 1991 Ottawa municipal election, though he withdrew from the contest before election day. In 1994, he ran for a seat on the Saint-Leonard city council in suburban Montreal and narrowly lost to incumbent Robert Zambito. In the 2003 election, he focused on economic development issues and called for an expansion of the Ottawa Congress Centre. Vigna has argued cases before the Canadian Human Rights Tribunal against persons accused of online hate speech. In 2010, he won a libel suit against right-wing pundit Ezra Levant; a judge ruled that Levant had libelled Vigna with "reckless indifference" to the truth in various blog posts.
