= Riverside Park, Ottawa =

Coordinates: 45°22′04″N 75°41′00″W

Riverside Park
- Neighbourhood
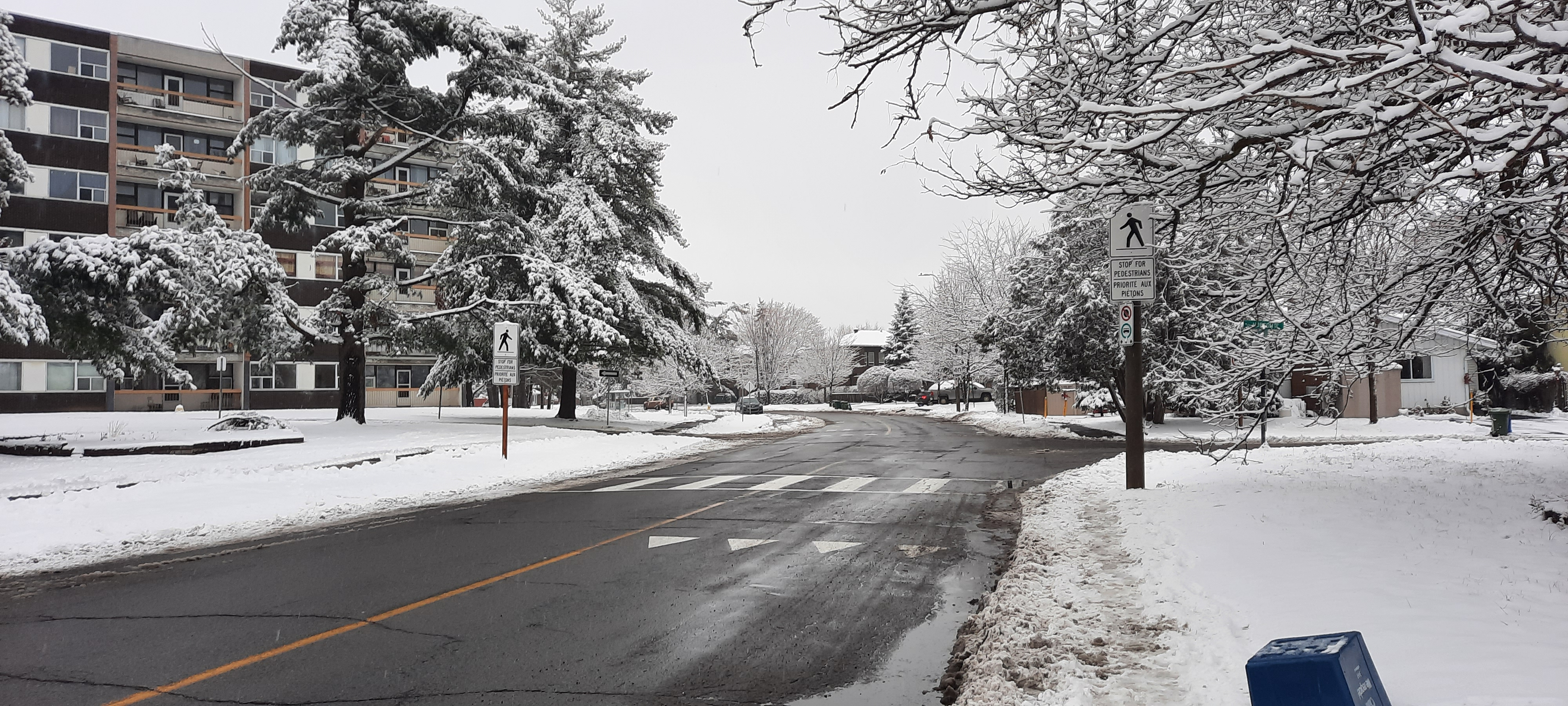
- Looking South on Springland Dr

- Location within Ottawa
- Country: Canada
- Province: Ontario
- City: Ottawa

Government
  - MPs: David McGuinty
  - MPPs: John Fraser
  - City Counciler: Riley Brockington
  - Community association: Riverside Park Community Association

Population (2011)
  - Total: 7,457
  - Density: 2,194/km^{2} (5,680/sq mi)
- Time zone: UTC-5 (Eastern (EST))
- Postal code: K1V
- Website: Official website

Riverside Park is a neighbourhood in the River Ward, located in the south end of Ottawa, Canada.

== History ==
It is bounded on the north by Brookfield Road, on the east by the Transitway, on the south by the CN rail tracks and on the west by the Rideau River.

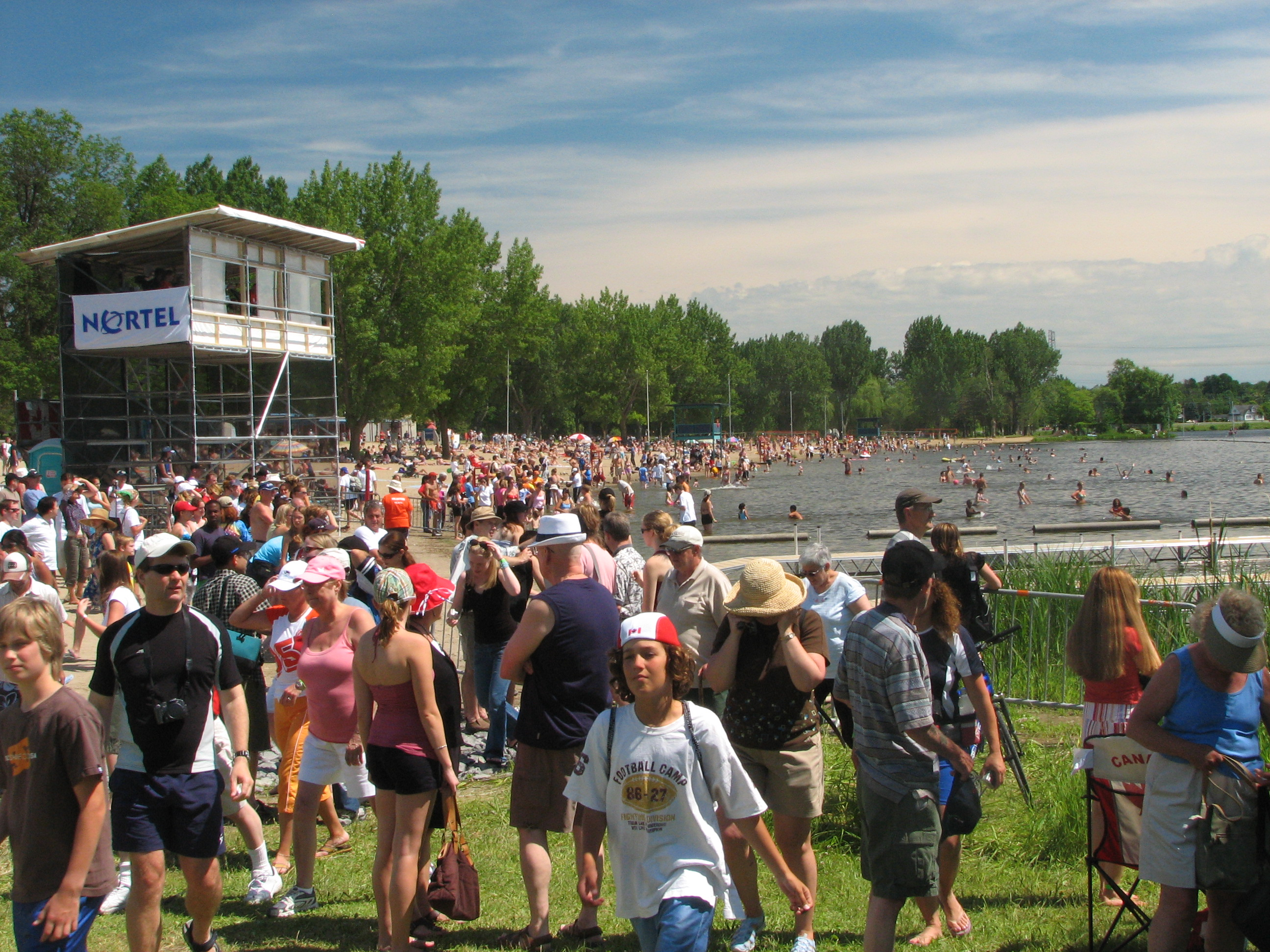
Mooney's Bay Park during the 2006 edition of the Ottawa Dragon Boat Race Festival

The neighbourhood includes one of Ottawa's most well known beaches at Mooney's Bay and the Terry Fox Athletic Facility. Confederation Heights sits at the northern tip of the neighbourhood. It also includes the Ottawa Hunt and Golf Club, which has hosted professional and amateur golf tournaments.

The neighbourhood is bifurcated by a Via Rail Corridor, once owned and operated by the OCRR. The area west of it is known as Mooney's Bay and the area east of it is called General Vanier. The area to the south of Walkley Road is Divided into three, McCarthy Rd Separates Riverside East and Riverside West. The area in-between the Rideau River and Riverside Rd is known as Revelstoke .

According to the Canada 2011 Census, the population of the neighbourhood north of Walkley (Census Tract 5050003.00) was 4564 and south of Walkley (Census Tract 5050002.01) was 2893 for a total of 7457.

== Culture ==
Riverside park has been, and continues to be, a densely populated and multi-cultural community.

=== Religion ===
Riverside Park is home to a three places of worship including:

- Riverside United Church (Located at 3191 Riverside Dr)
- St. Elias Antiochian Orthodox Cathedral (Located at 750 Ridgewood Ave)
- Holy Cross Parish (Located at 685 Walkley Rd)

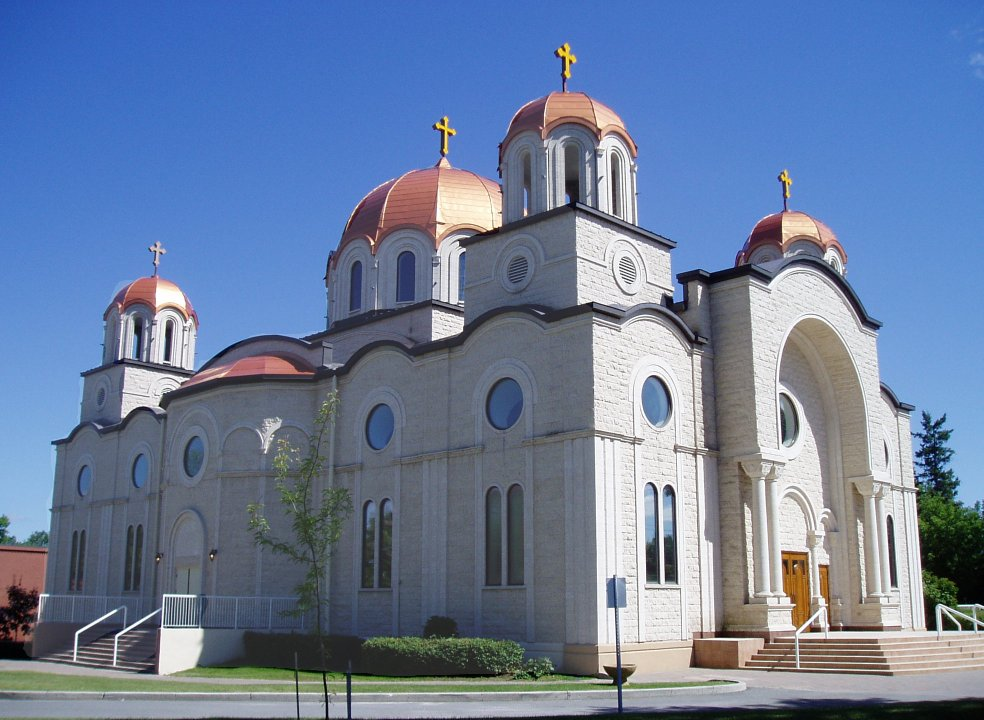

=== Education ===
The area is served by Brookfield High School, Fielding Dr Public School, General Vanier, Bayview Public School, Georges Étienne Cartier as well as the Holy Cross Catholic School.

In August 2007, Bayview Public School was closed at its site on Riverside drive and later demolished in 2009. Its French immersion program moved to the R. Byrns Curry Public School building (renamed Bayview Public School). R. Byrns Curry students were reassigned to General Vanier Public School (J-K to grade 3) and Fielding Drive Public School (grades 4 to 8). The area on which the former school sat on has been a large spark of controversy after its demolition, the city was going to develop the property into a retirement homes. The issue came when the initial plan of low to medium density changed to high density despite its promise to the community. After many years of push backs from the community construction has started on the lands.

=== Community Events ===
Riverside park is home to several yearly events that are both unique to the neighbourhood but the city as a whole.

Lebanese Fest

The Ottawa Lebanese festival is an annual event organized at the St. Elias Cathedral in the Mooney's Bay sub-neighbourhood. Originating in 1990 the festival is a popular and takes place every year in July. In 2019 alongside the street sign to Ridgewood avenue decorative signs were added to honour the poet Kahlil Gibran.

Tim Hortons Dragon Boat Festival

The festival originating in 1993, takes place in Mooney's Bay and was the creation of community members with the support of the Hong Kong business association. This yearly festival brings more than just races but a collection of artisan vendors, concerts and more. Recognized as the largest of its kind in north America it draws visitors from across the city and is a staple in the neighbourhood.

== Parks ==
The Riverside community has a high park density, the area is served by thirteen parks;

=== Mooney's Bay ===
- Hog's Back Park (Located along Hog's Back Rd)
- Vincent Massey Park (Located at Heron Rd and Riverside Dr)
- Mooney's Bay Beach (Located along Riverside Dr)
- Paget Park (Located at Hobson Rd and Garner Ave)
- Ernie Calcutt Park (Located at Mooneys Bay Pl and Springland Dr)
- Marble Park (Located at Marble cr and Flannery Dr)
- Flannery Park (Located at the Corner of Flannery Dr)

=== General Vanier ===
- Pauline Vanier Park (Located adjacent to General Vanier Public School)

=== Riverside West ===
- Otterson Park (Located on Blanchard Cr)
- Arnott Park (Located on Hartman Cr)

=== Riverside East ===
- Linton Park, (Located between the Airport Parkway and Linton Rd)
- Stanstead Park (Located adjacent to École élémentaire catholique George-Étienne-Cartier)

=== Revelstroke ===
- Geoff Wightman Park (Located on the corner of Kamloops Ave)
