= Sir Charles Tupper Building =

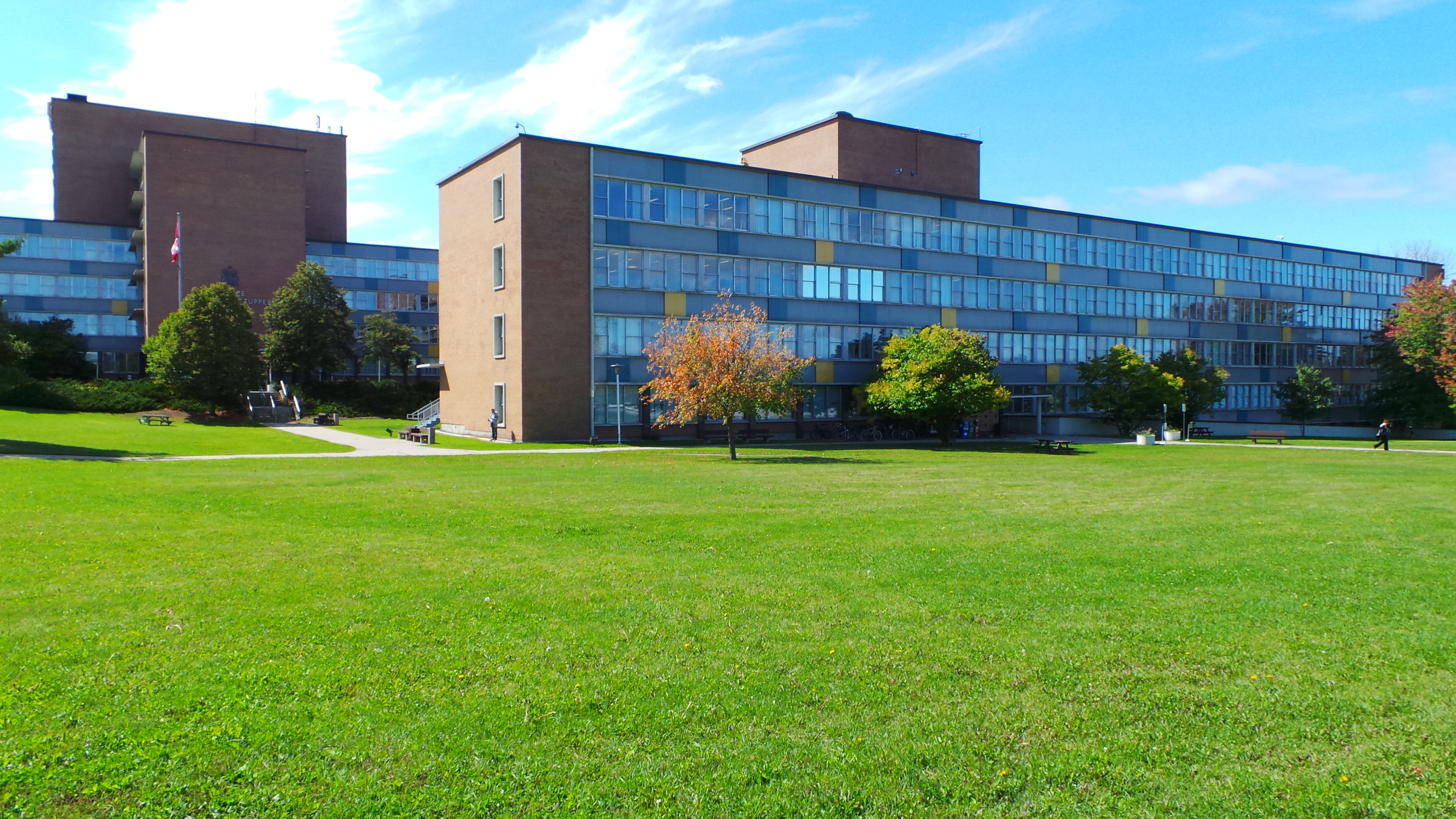

General information
- Type: Canadian government office
- Location: Ottawa, Ontario, Canada, 2720 Riverside Drive
- Coordinates: 45°22′31″N 75°41′35″W
- Named for: Charles Tupper
- Construction started: 1955
- Completed: 1960
- Client: Canadian government
- Owner: Public Services and Procurement Canada

Technical details
- Floor area: 31,260 m^{2} (336,500 sq ft)

Design and construction
- Architecture firm: Hazlegrove and Lithwick

The Sir Charles Tupper Building on its completion in 1960 served as the headquarters of the Department of Public Works, known by its applied title as Public Services and Procurement Canada. Public Services and Procurement Canada later moved its headquarters to Gatineau, Quebec, across the Ottawa River from Ottawa. The building also housed some Health Canada operations, notably the headquarters of the Pest Management Regulatory Agency. It was named in honour of the Father of Confederation and sixth Prime Minister of Canada. In 2023, the Government of Canada indicated that it plans to dispose of the building.

The Tupper building is one of the five original facilities making up the Confederation Heights development completed from the late 1950s into the 1960s, in accordance with the Greber Plan to decentralize Federal government functions.

Built in International Style on a large sloping site at Confederation Heights, the Tupper building consists of five thin, interlocking rectangular blocks, four/five stories tall, laid out at right angles in a geometric, stair-like arrangement. While the internal arrangements of the building have changed over time, its outside appearance has remained the same.

In recognition of its architectural importance, the Sir Charles Tupper building was added to the Canadian Register of Historic Places in 2007.
