= Carleton Heights =

- Neighbourhood
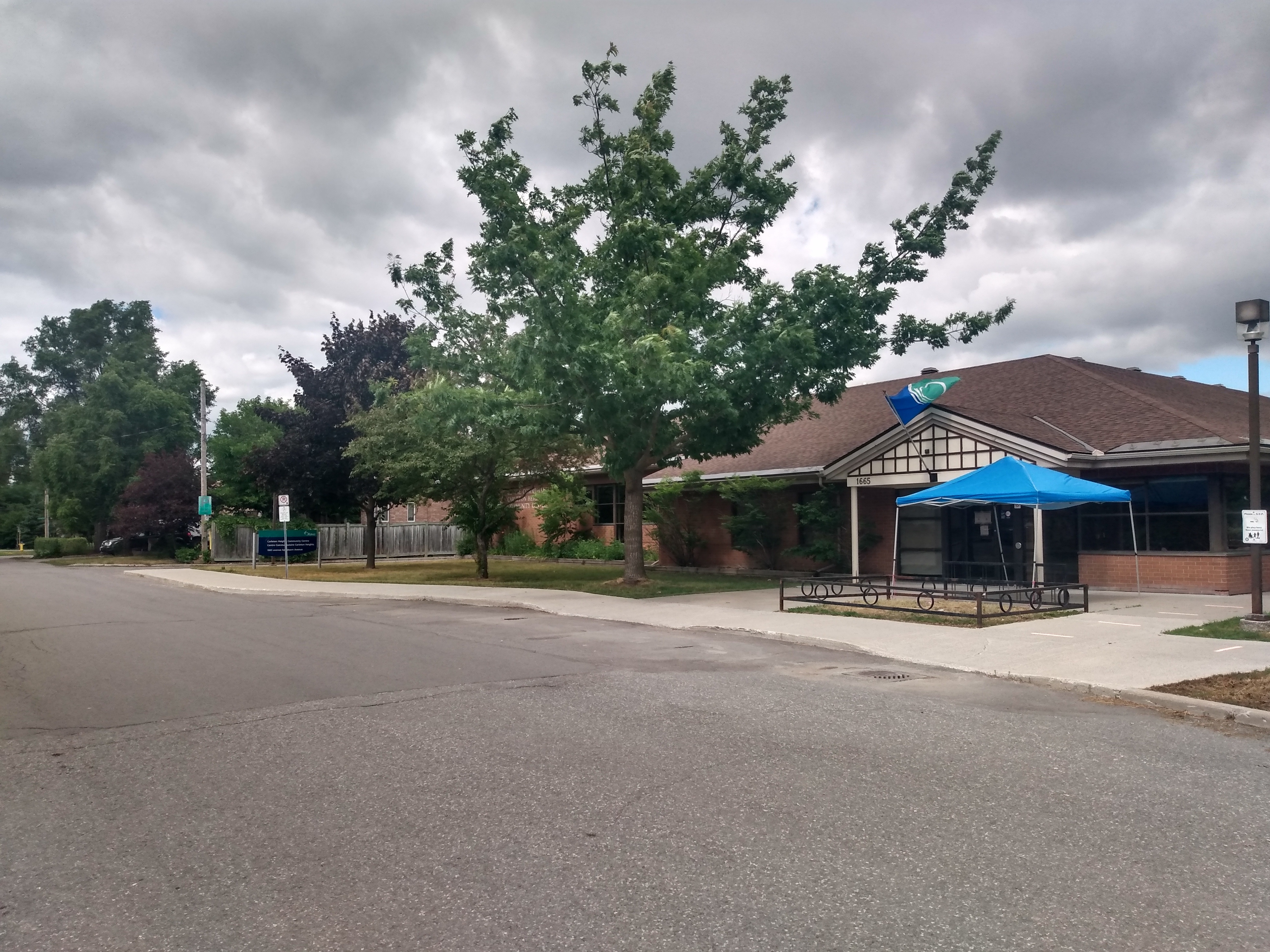
- Carleton Heights Community Centre

- Location within Ottawa
- Coordinates: 45°22′00″N 75°42′20″W
- Country: Canada
- Province: Ontario
- City: Ottawa

Government
  - MPs: Yasir Naqvi
  - MPPs: Joel Harden
  - Councillors: Riley Brockington
  - Governing body: Carleton Heights and Area Residents Association
  - President: Elizabeth Anderson

Area
  - Total: 3.473 km^{2} (1.341 sq mi)
- Elevation: 85 m (279 ft)

Population (Canada 2016 Census)
  - Total: 7,586
  - Density: 2,184/km^{2} (5,657/sq mi)
- Time zone: Eastern (EST)
- Forward sortation area: K2C

Carleton Heights (French: Hauteurs Carleton) is a neighbourhood in River Ward in Ottawa, Ontario, Canada. According to the Carleton Heights and Area Community Association, the neighbourhood is bounded on the north by the Central Experimental Farm, on the east by the Rideau River, on the south by the junction of Prince of Wales Drive and Fisher Avenue and on the west by Fisher Avenue. The neighbourhood is sometimes referred to as Hog's Back after the nearby falls. The total population of the neighbourhood is 7,586 according to the Canada 2016 Census.

Homes were developed after World War II in the main Carleton Heights neighbourhood (then part of Nepean Township), located south of Meadowlands Drive. Most of these homes were not built until c. 1950. The neighbourhood was originally built for War Veterans, thanks to the Veterans' Land Act. The houses were small, but were built on large lots (many of which were subdivided in the future). The Courtland Park section of the neighbourhood, located north of Dynes North was next to be built. Rideau View, located between Dynes and Meadowlands, and east of Claymor Avenue was built next, in the early 1960s. This area was expanded by the construction of the Debra Dynes Community Housing project, the Prince of Wales Complex and Chateau Royale apartments (east of Prince of Wales) and the Carleton Square neighbourhood (west of Claymor) in the early 1970s. Finally, the Prince of Wales on the Rideau neighbourhood was built in the late 2000s.

Carleton Heights has a community centre which is adjacent to the Carleton Heights Curling Club and Carleton Heights Public School.

== Sub neighbourhoods ==
- Courtland Park
- Carleton Square
- Rideau View
- Prince of Wales on the Rideau
- Rideauview Terrace

== See also ==
- List of Ottawa neighbourhoods
- Geography of Ottawa
