= George Brown (Ottawa politician) =

Canadian politician in Ottawa

Ottawa City Councillor
- In office 1985–1994
- Preceded by: Jim Durrell
- Succeeded by: Karin Howard
- Constituency: Riverside Ward

Personal details
- Born: 1959 (age 66–67)
- Spouse: Sandy
- Children: 2
- Education: University of Ottawa; Southern New Hampshire University

George M. Brown (born 1959) is a former Ottawa City Councillor. He represented Riverside Ward from 1985 to 1994.

== Career ==
Brown was first elected in the 1985 municipal election, defeating three other candidates with 45% of the vote. Prior to being elected he was a child care worker. In his initial election campaign, he characterized himself as a centrist who combined a dislike of bureaucracy and "big government" with strong support for community-based services such as non-profit organizations, child care services and co-operatives. Early in his first council term, he served on a committee to save the city's bookmobile service after it was threatened by funding cuts, and spearheaded a motion to have city council members' job title formally changed from "alderman" to "councillor". He also supported a then-controversial $5,000 grant to Gays of Ottawa, the city's primary organization for LGBT people, on the grounds that denying the grant because of the group's sexual orientation would be discriminatory.

He was easily re-elected in the 1988 municipal election, winning 85 per cent of the vote over his sole opponent. During his second term, he successfully lobbied his fellow councillors to institute a ban on gun and weapon shows on city property. He became chair of the city's economic affairs committee, and served on the environmental services committee of the Regional Municipality of Ottawa-Carleton.

He was reelected again in the 1991 municipal election. During this term he was chair of the regional environmental services committee, and served as vice-chair of the housing task force for the Federation of Canadian Municipalities.

He did not run for re-election in 1994.

After municipal politics, Brown joined the Ontario Green Party and ran in Ottawa South in the 1999 provincial election, winning two per cent of the vote. In 2007, he ran for the Conservative Party of Canada nomination in Ottawa South, losing to Elie Salibi.

Brown became a lawyer in 2003. He served as president of the Ottawa Community Loan Fund, and is a part-time professor at the University of Ottawa's law school. As a lawyer, he specializes in immigration and community development. He currently lives in the Mooney's Bay area of the city. He has a Master of Science degree in community economic development from New Hampshire College (now Southern New Hampshire University) and an LL.B. degree from the University of Ottawa Law School.

He ran for the New Democratic Party in Ottawa South in the 2015 Canadian federal election.
