= Turnbull School =

Location
- 1132 Fisher Avenue; Ottawa, Ontario, K1Z 6P7; Canada; 45.37796°N 75.72086°W

Information
- Type: Private, independent, co-educational day school
- Religious affiliation: Non-denominational
- Founded: 1992
- Founder: Mary Ann S. Turnbull
- Directors: Craig Dunn and Buddy Clinch
- Grades: JK–8
- Enrollment: 420 (2026)
- Language: English
- Campus size: 5.5 acres (2.2 ha)
- Team name: Tornadoes
- Affiliation: Ontario Federation of Independent Schools
- Website: turnbull.ca

Turnbull School is a private, non-denominational, co-educational day school for students from junior kindergarten to grade 8, located on Fisher Avenue in the Carlington area of Ottawa, Ontario, Canada, near the Central Experimental Farm. It was founded in 1992 by educator Mary Ann S. Turnbull.

== History ==
The school grew out of the Turnbull Learning Centre, which Turnbull opened in 1981 in a house on Argyle Street to offer part-time academic programs and summer school. In September 1992 she opened a full-time school on Sherwood Drive, near Carling Avenue, with 30 students; as enrolment grew, space was rented in nearby buildings.

Turnbull acquired a 5.5-acre (2.2 ha) parcel on Fisher Avenue from the National Capital Commission, and in April 1996 about 150 students moved into a new purpose-built school there. A senior school building with a double gymnasium, science laboratory and visual arts room was added in 2003, and part of the junior building was later converted into an early-education centre for kindergarten.

Turnbull retired as Director in 2012 and remains associated with the school as its founder; she was succeeded by Gareth Reid, who had taught at the school since 1998. During the COVID-19 pandemic in 2020, Turnbull was among several Ottawa private schools reporting inquiries from public-school families; its junior school principal attributed the school's ability to adapt its teaching to its small class sizes. A music hall opened in 2021, and a technology lab used for robotics and 3D printing opened in September 2025. Reid retired in 2025, and Buddy Clinch and Craig Dunn, previously the school's junior and senior school principals respectively, became Directors.

== Academics ==
The school follows the Ontario curriculum. Each grade is taught in single-grade classes, with class sizes of 10 students in kindergarten rising to a maximum of 18 in grades 7 and 8. Students take French six times a week, grouped by proficiency from grade 4. Grade 7 and 8 subjects are taught by subject specialists, and students in those grades write two exam sessions a year.

All students have daily physical education and music twice a week; instrumental music begins in grade 3. Students compete in the Ottawa Regional Science Fair.

== Student life ==
Turnbull's competitive teams, the Turnbull Tornadoes, play in the Ottawa Independent Schools Athletic Association from grade 5. The school band performs at the Capital Region and National MusicFest competitions.

The school has no daily uniform; students follow a dress code and wear a school golf shirt on special occasions.

== Community involvement ==
Students run annual fundraising campaigns for United Way Ottawa, Help Lesotho and The Ottawa Hospital. The hospital campaign began with a small group of students and teachers entering Ottawa Race Weekend; by 2026 it was a month-long, school-wide event in its 28th year, ending in a school track-and-field race day and raising close to $40,000 annually. Through Help Lesotho, the school has been twinned since at least 2005 with Sefapanong Primary School near the village of Paray, Lesotho. The City of Ottawa recognized the school in 2016 for passing $1 million in charitable fundraising.
