= Riley Brockington =

Canadian politician (born 1975)

Ottawa City Councillor
- Incumbent
- Assumed office December 1, 2014
- Preceded by: Maria McRae
- Constituency: River Ward

OCDSB Trustee
- In office December 1, 2003 – December 1, 2010
- Preceded by: Brian Gifford
- Succeeded by: Shirley Seward
- Constituency: Zone 11 (River Ward)

Personal details
- Born: November 13, 1975 (age 50) Ottawa, Ontario, Canada
- Party: Independent

Riley Sterling Brockington (born November 13, 1975) is an Ottawa City Councillor for River Ward and former trustee of the Ottawa-Carleton District School Board.

== Personal ==
Brockington was born at the Grace Hospital to parents Bruce and Marilyn Brockington (née Hunt).

Brockington grew up in the Riverside Park/Mooney's Bay neighbourhood of Ottawa's River Ward and attended public schools in the community. He attended Brookfield High School where he was the student council co-president in his final year, and graduated in 1994. After high school, he attended the University of Ottawa where he obtained a degree in economics.

== Career ==
Brockington first ran for office for Ottawa City Council as he was graduating as an OAC high school student at Brookfield and starting his studies at the University of Ottawa in the 1994 Ottawa municipal election in Ward 8 (later named Mooney's Bay Ward). He turned 19 the day before election day, making him eligible to run for office. He campaigned in opposition to the building of government offices at Confederation Heights until proper studies could be done. He also wanted the preservation of parks in the ward, to keep taxes low, more funding for fire departments and police and opposed the tearing down of the Prince of Wales Youth Centre. He opposed building a casino at the airport. In the election, he won 535 votes, with 5% of the vote, 5th place behind the winner, Karin Howard.

Prior to being elected to city council, Brockington worked for 16 years at Statistics Canada. as a wholesale trade statistical analyst. He spent a number of years in the Education Division, managing a national education survey and publishing both pan-Canadian data and research papers on the same subject. Later in his career, he took on two publications related to international travel statistics.

In addition to his work at Statistics Canada, Brockington was also on the board of the Canadian Association of Professional Employees, serving for two years as national vice-president and three years as chair of the finance committee.

Prior to entering politics, he served as President of the Riverside Park Community and Recreation Association.

In the 2003 municipal elections, Brockington ran for a seat as a trustee on the Ottawa-Carleton District School Board for Zone 11, which corresponded to the city's River Ward. He ran on a platform of smaller class sizes for kindergarten to grade 3, the recruitment of "talented teachers and administrators", the renovation and the repairing of schools, having adequate resources for special education, French immersion, and English as a second language, as well as a "reinvestment in field trips". He was elected to the school board, winning 2,274 votes (41%), defeating opponents Marita Moll and Patty Anne Hill.

Brockington was easily re-elected in the 2006 municipal elections, defeating Patrick Ready, 5,617 votes to 2,626. During his two terms on the school board, he served in several capacities including Chair of the Business Services Committee, Budget Committee, and Vice-Chair of the Board. In 2009, School Board Trustees from across Ontario elected Brockington the Vice-President of the Ontario Public School Boards Association. Brockington planned to run for re-election in the 2010 municipal elections, but dropped out on the final day of nominations. He cited having accomplished his goals as trustee, having to juggle a full-time job at Statistics Canada and all the meeting for reasons for dropping out. Brockington donated to the Conservative Party of Canada during the 2011 Canadian federal election.

After four years out of politics, Brockington secured permission from his employer (as is required from public servants) on the last day of nominations to run for a seat on Ottawa City Council in the 2014 municipal elections. Brockington ran in River Ward, which had become an open seat upon the retirement of incumbent Maria McRae. He was easily elected to the seat on October 27, 2014, and was sworn in on December 1, 2014. Following his election, Brockington was named vice chair of the community and protective services committee.

During the 2014–18 term of office, Brockington was seen as one of the pro mayor Jim Watson councillors, and he indicated he was planning on voting for Watson in the 2018 Ottawa municipal election.

In the October 22, 2018 municipal election, Brockington was re-elected in River Ward. While he faced a tough campaign, he ended up easily winning, receiving 55 per cent of the vote against his main opponent, Fabien Kalala Cimankinda who won 22%. During the campaign, Brockington supported an increased police budget, more community policing and money for road infrastructure. He also wanted to renovated and expand the Alexander Community Centre in Carlington.

During his second tenure, Brockington serves on the Planning Committee, Environment Committee, Transit Commission, Ottawa Public Library (COVID ad hoc committee and Fundraising Committee), Built Heritage Sub Committee, Association of Municipalities of Ontario (AMO) and Canadian Capital Cities Organization.

In 2026, Brockington was acclaimed as president of the Association of Municipalities of Ontario for 2026-2028.

Brockington was re-elected by acclamation in the 2026 Ottawa municipal election.
