= Maria McRae =

Canadian lawyer and politician

Ottawa City Councillor
- In office 2003–2014
- Preceded by: Wendy Stewart
- Succeeded by: Riley Brockington
- Constituency: River Ward

Personal details
- Born: c. 1966 Sudbury, Ontario
- Spouse: Paul

Maria McRae (born c. 1966 in Sudbury, Ontario) is a Canadian lawyer and politician. She represented the River Ward on Ottawa City Council, covering some of the city's southern suburbs. Born in Sudbury, Ontario McRae has an undergraduate degree in biology and a law degree from the University of Western Ontario. She moved to Ottawa in 2000 working as a legal consultant and teaching at Algonquin College. In the 2003 Ottawa election ran to replace the departing Wendy Stewart. McRae, who was endorsed by Stewart, won a large victory against two opponents in the November 10 election. She was re-elected in 2010, but announced that she would not run again in 2014. On council, she was considered a centrist. She lives in the Hunt Club area with her husband, Paul.

== First mandate ==
She ran on a fiscally conservative platform opposing tax hikes and voted against a tax increase the first year, but faced with the significant budget shortfall she was forced to abandon this pledge. She also was criticized for paying Stewart $4000 in consulting fees.

On November 9, 2005, McRae did not vote in favour of a pesticide bylaw that was promoted by the Canadian Cancer Society and the Children's Hospital of Eastern Ontario (CHEO). In the period leading up to the vote, McRae was implicated in email incident. It was the daughter of a woman retired federal intelligence analyst who discovered McRae's wrongdoing, when the daughter received an acknowledgement from Councillor Cullen on which the content of her pro-bylaw e-mail was changed to read the opposite. Allegedly, the daughter's predicament was not unique, as there were about 40 other e-mails that were similarly altered. Evidently, Maria McRae had been involved by having written an email whereby she impersonated Councillor Alex Cullen by placing his name on a pro-pesticide e-mail petition conducted by a pro-pesticide website, propertyrights.ca. Alex Cullen, who in fact supports a strong pesticide bylaw, replied to McRae stating: "I must tell you that I am doubly disappointed to learn that you, a council colleague, used my name to author a message you knew did not represent my position and then, when the matter became public more than three weeks ago, you did not acknowledge your role in this matter, neither to me nor to the public."

The City of Ottawa's investigation into propertyrights.ca that implicated McRae reportedly cost the city about $1,500 in overtime. The investigation cleared McRae of any intentional wrongdoing with Chief Corporate Services Officer Greg Geddes stating that McRae's actions were nothing more than an "innocent mistake."

McRae subsequently apologized to City Council stating "I'm very sorry." Alex Cullen accepted McRae's apology and said he would now put the issue behind him.

She was the Chair of Ottawa Community Housing Corporation from 2004 until 2006 – the province of Ontario’s second largest landlord with 50,000 tenants living in more than 15,000 units of housing stock worth more than $2B. She was Vice-Chair of the Corporate Services and Economic Development Committee from 2003-2006.

== Second mandate ==
On November 13, 2006, McRae again won in the Ottawa Municipal election, garnering over 65% of the vote to remain River Ward City Councillor.

In February 2007, Maria McRae brought to the attention of the City Solicitor a complaint regarding a community newspaper named "Capital Xtra." The "Capital Xtra" caters to gay and lesbian lifestyles. By April 2007, the City of Ottawa's legal counsel produced a legal brief concluding that restricting distribution of the paper in city facilities was tantamount to censorship and restricting freedom of expression—as guaranteed under the Charter of Rights and Freedoms.

Maria McRae was criticized, along with several other councillors and city staff, for the appearance of a conflict of interest for having accepted a free corporate box seat at the 2007 Stanley Cup NHL hockey playoff game (Senators v.s. Anaheim Ducks) at Scotiabank Place from Waste Management Services—a company that the City does business with. McRae was involved in the cause of firefighters that contracted cancer in the line of duty. Her motion passed unanimously by Ottawa City Council and led to other municipalities passing similar motions. McRae joined the firefighters as they went to Queen's Park to make their case. Subsequently, the Ontario government amended the law to provide firefighters and their families with enhanced benefits.

On September 27, 2007, the Sawmill Creek Constructed Wetland officially opened. McRae lobbied for the funding to finish this project which provides an environmental benefit by filtering out sediment and pollutants, reducing downstream erosion, and controlling flood waters during heavy rains.

The Ottawa Sun's "City Council 2007 Report Card" gave Maria McRae a D, citing among other things that "McRae has to learn that shoving her colleagues aside in the rush for the camera really isn't very becoming." Her 2008 report card grade was upgraded to B, noting her hard work on several issues. Describing McRae as a "tireless worker", her grade improved to a B+ in 2009, due in part to her improved relations with her fellow councillors.

== Third mandate ==
McRae was a candidate for River Ward in the 2010 Municipal Election, easily winning re-election with close to 60% of the votes.

== Legacy ==
Maria McRae did not run in the October 2014 municipal elections.

=== Airport Parkway Pedestrian Bridge ===
Although the project was plagued with a variety of problems and delays, McRae remained a supporter of the project.

=== Community Centre ===
McRae claims to have been proudest of her contribution to the expansion of the Hunt Club-Riverside Park Community Centre.

=== Parks ===
Spending on public parks sparked controversy in March 2015, after McRae's departure from office. Her successor, Riley Brockington announced that he had discovered there was no money left in an account for park upgrades because it had all been spent by McRae during her last year in office. In fact the account was $500 in deficit.

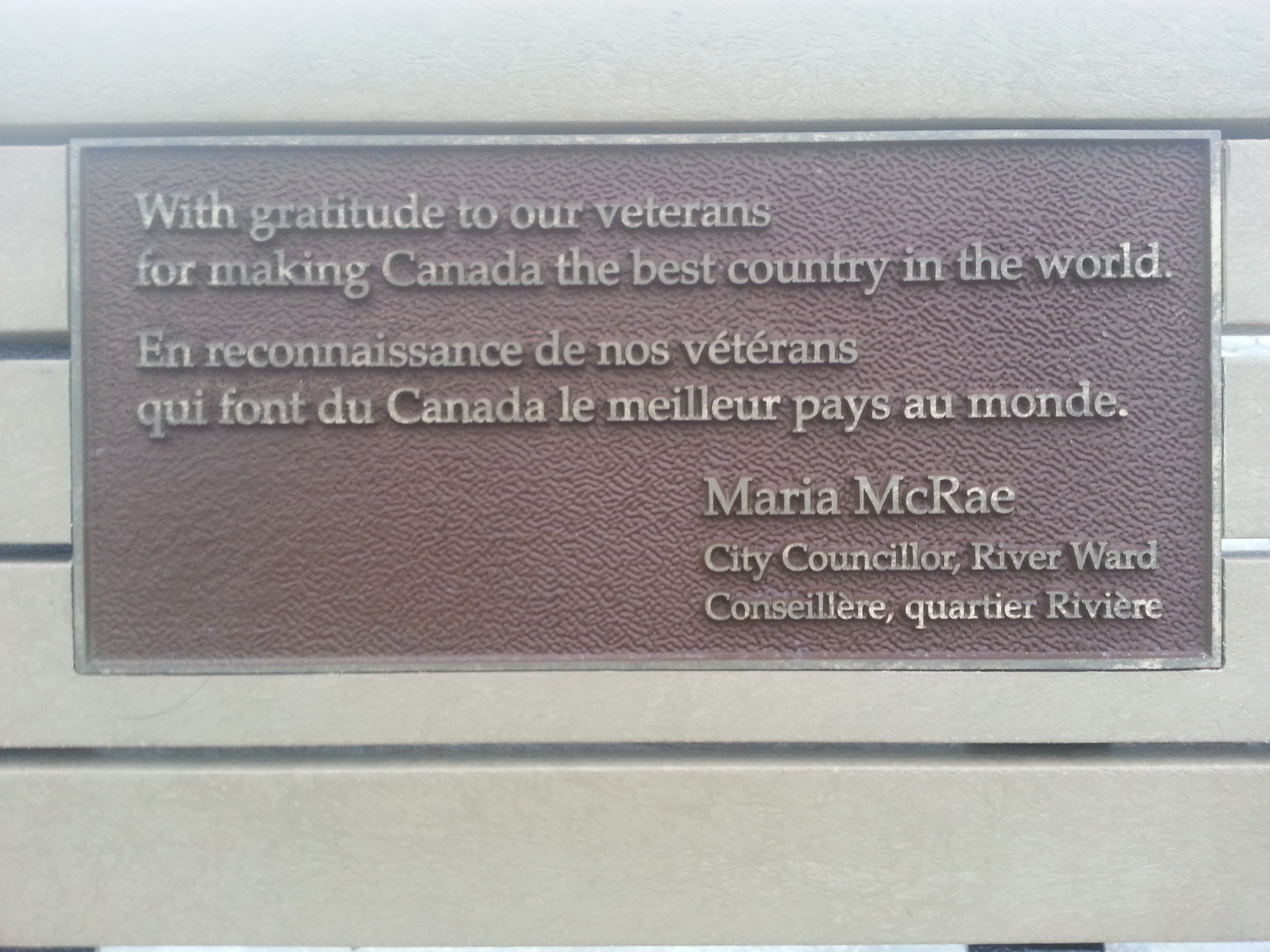
Example of the bronze plaques affixed to park benches.

According to the city, much of the $600 000 was spent on park improvements such as play structures, but a significant portion was spent on park benches adorned with bronze plaques. The plaques, ostensibly thanking veterans for their contribution to Canada, were emblazoned with McRae's name. Both the cost of the plaques (about C$600 each) and the fact that they were signed by McRae herself were cited by councillors Riley Brockington and Jody Mitic as reasons to question the appropriateness of the expense and call for changes in the rules to prevent its recurrence.

In a July 2015 report to the Planning Committee by Acting Deputy City Manager John L. Moser, several recommendations were made aiming to prevent the re-occurrence of such events. One of the recommendations is to make ineligible for funding "any items that could be perceived as promotional, including plaques or engravings containing Council members' names, pictures or likenesses."

== Committees ==
Prior to her retirement from office in 2014, Maria McRae was a member of the following standing committees of Ottawa City Council:

- Emergency and Protective Services Committee
- License Committee (quasi-judicial, administrative tribunal)
- Long Range Financial Plan Committee
- Transportation Committee (chair)
- Member Services Committee
- Ottawa Police Services Board

She also represented Ottawa City Council as a member of the following board of directors and committees:

- Commonwealth Games 2014 Bid Committee
- Ottawa Forests and Greenspace Advisory Committee
- Ottawa Public Library Board
- Ottawa Tourism and Convention Authority
- Rideau Valley Conservation Authority
- Rural Summit Steering Committee
- Rural Summit Task Force

== Election results ==
=== Ottawa municipal election, 2003 ===
River Ward (Ward 16)
Candidate	Votes	%
Maria McRae	5600	63.11
Todd Mattila-Hartman	1654	18.64
Richard Smith	1619	18.25

=== Ottawa municipal election, 2006 ===
River Ward (Ward 16)
Candidate	Votes	%
Maria McRae	9278	65.51
Blake Batson	4885	34.49

Preceded by Wendy Stewart	City councillors from River Ward; 2003-2014	Succeeded by Riley Brockington
