= Vincent Massey Park =

Park in Ottawa, Ontario, Canada

Coordinates: 45°22′45″N 75°41′45″W

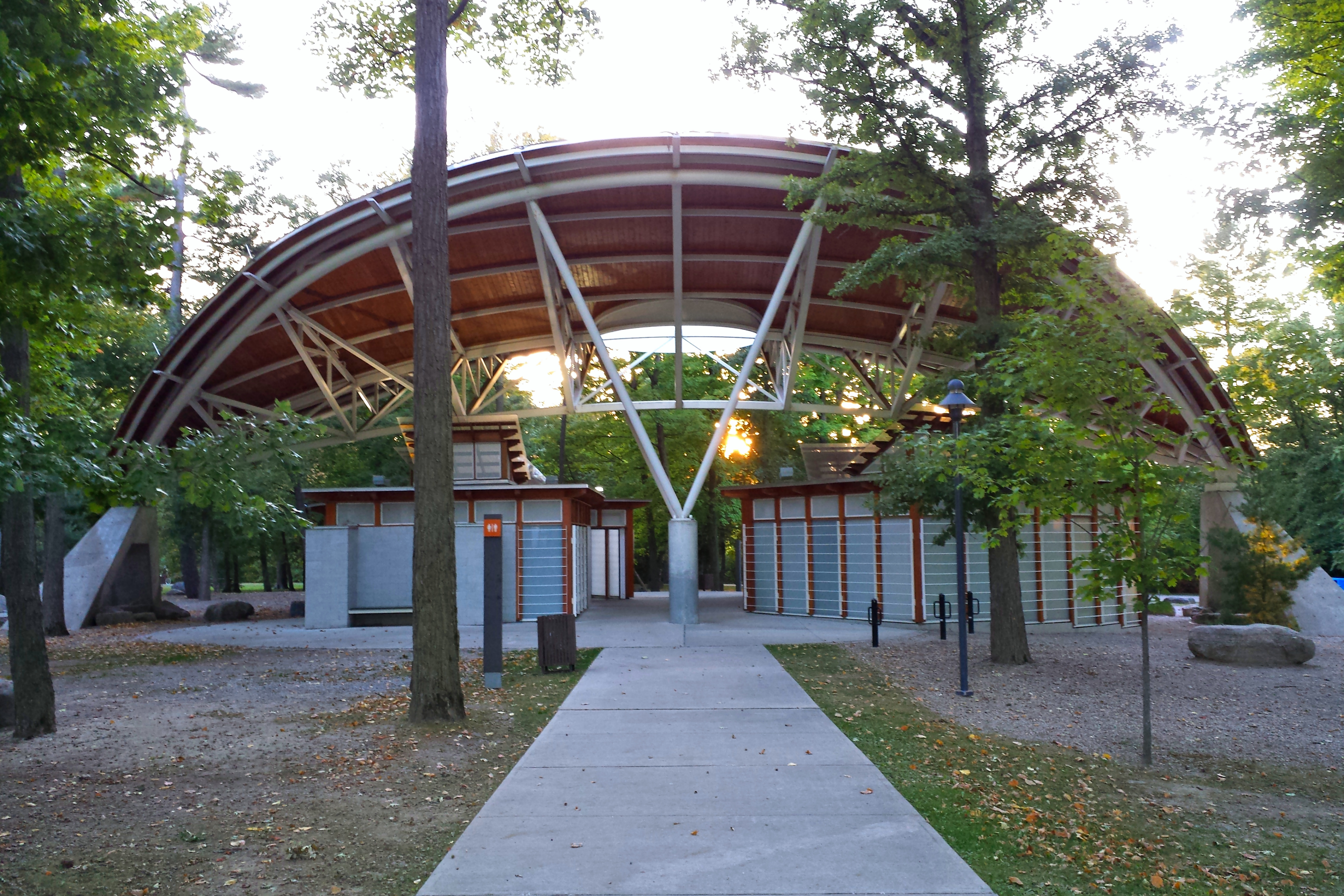
Facilities in Vincent Massey Park

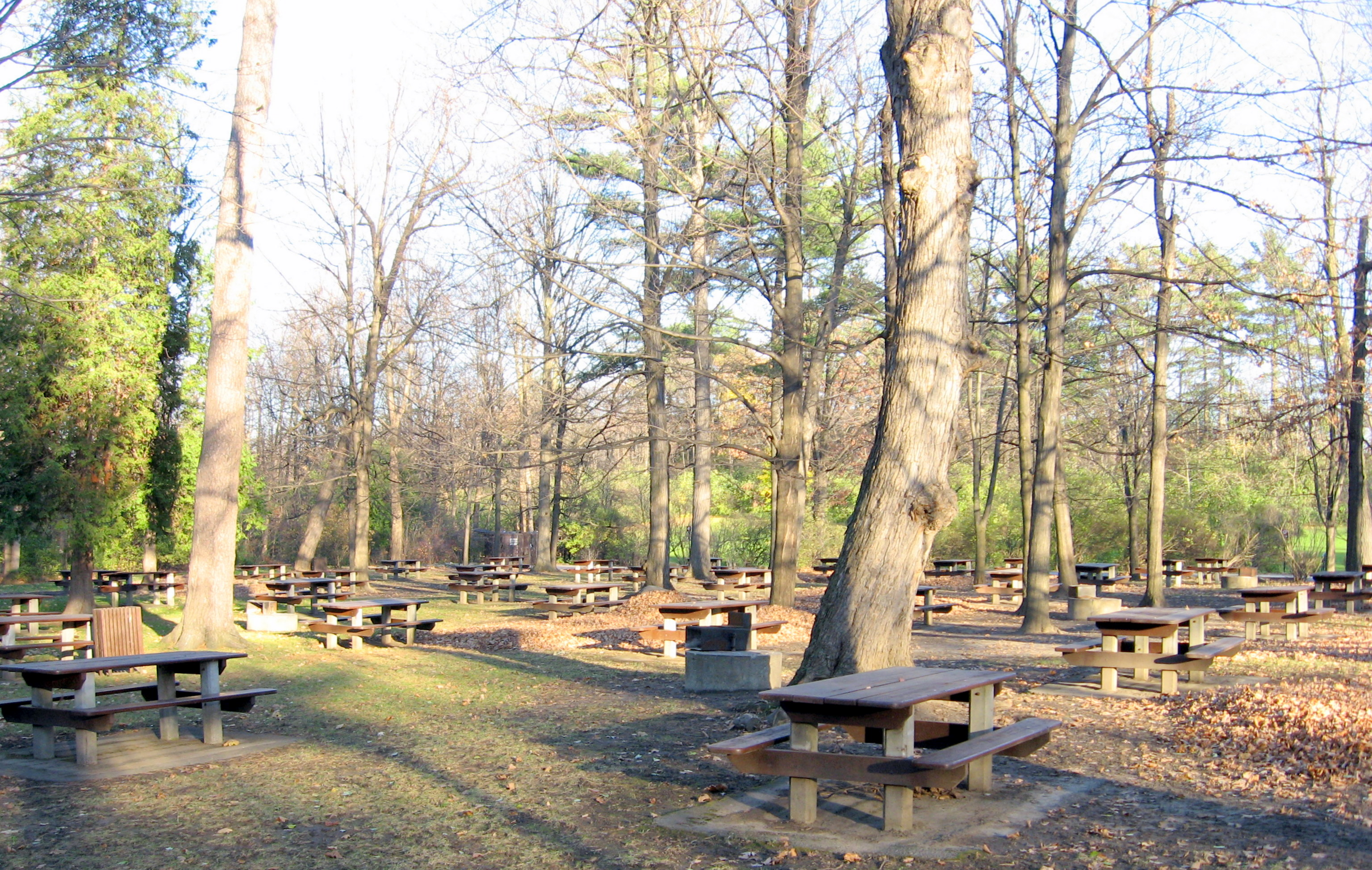
Picnic benches in Vincent Massey Park

Vincent Massey Park is an urban park along the Rideau River in the Confederation Heights neighbourhood of Ottawa, Ontario, Canada, accessible via Heron Road. It is extensively used in the summer for family and group picnics. It was once connected to Hog's Back Park, but they were divided by Heron Road in 1969.

The park has wooded walking paths, rolling meadows, scenic vistas, open grassy areas for playing sports, and picnic tables. Available amenities include washrooms, pathways, water fountains, bandstand, two softball diamonds, electrical hook-ups, and barbecue pits.

It is named after Charles Vincent Massey, 18th Governor General of Canada.

== Authority ==
Vincent Massey Park is managed and within the jurisdictional authority of The National Capital Commission of Canada (NCC).

== Monuments ==
The Canadian Labour Congress has officially established April 28 as the Day of Mourning to workers killed and injured on the job. The National Day of Mourning monument was dedicated by the Canadian Labour Congress on April 28, 1987, in Vincent Massey Park.

== See also ==
- List of Ottawa parks
