= General Vanier Public School (Ottawa) =

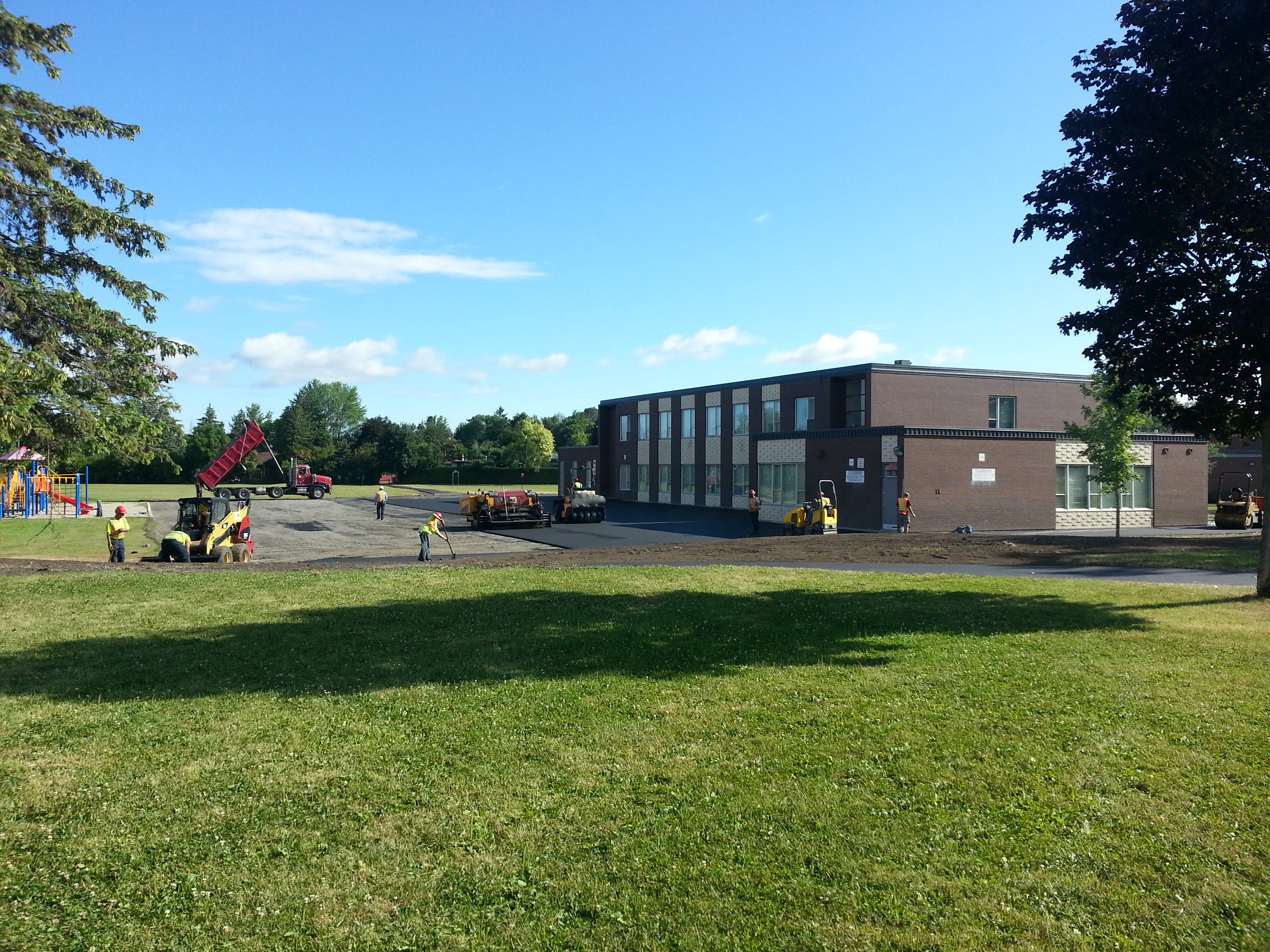
- Repaving the General Vanier PS schoolyard

Location
- 1025 Harkness Avenue; Ottawa, Ontario, K1V 6N9; Canada; 45.367644°N 75.674716°W

Information
- Motto: "Together, in a positive, secure environment, the General Vanier School Community fosters the development of respectful, caring, responsible, interdependent, self-directed learners."
- Established: 1963
- School board: Ottawa-Carleton District School Board
- Superintendent: Nadia Towaij
- Area trustee: Shirley Seward
- Principal: Caroline Rassi
- Grades: J-K to Grade 3
- Communities served: Riverside Park East
- Website: www.generalvanierps.ocdsb.ca

Opened for the 1963-64 school year, General Vanier Public School serves Ottawa's Riverside Park East and South communities. The school was completed in 1963 on what had been the Munro farm. The school accommodated students from kindergarten through grade 6. Grades 7 and 8 were transported by bus from the school to Hopewell Avenue School.

At the time of the opening in the fall of 1963, Bayview Public School on Riverside Drive was undergoing renovations. Students temporarily attended General Vanier PS.

The school adjoins Pauline Vanier Park, named after the Governor-General's wife.

== Naming the School ==
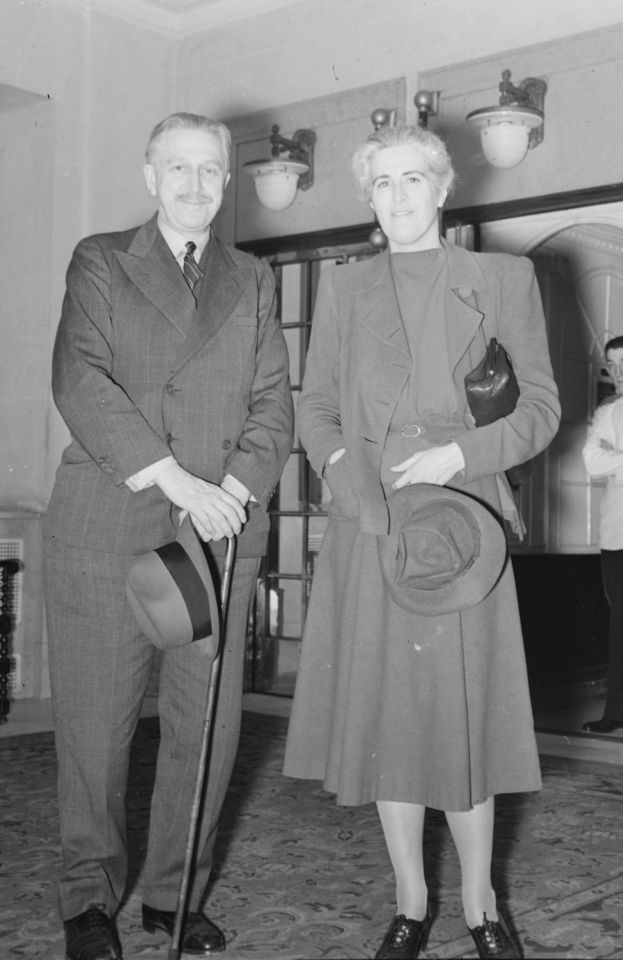
Georges and Pauline Vanier in 1940

The Ottawa public board, which had begun naming schools after vice-regal representatives, sought and obtained the permission of Governor-General Georges Vanier to name the school after him. It had already named schools after Governors-General Vincent Massey and Viscount Alexander.

== Visitors and Events ==
The Governor-General and Mrs Vanier attended the official opening of the school on 21 November 1963. On that occasion he unveiled a plaque commemorating the event, which is displayed at the entrance of the building. The visit was lighthearted, including a lesson for the children by Mrs. Vanier on how to curtsey.

In May 1964, Mrs. Vanier returned for another visit to the school. On this occasion she granted the students a special holiday, at the request of the Governor-General who had asked she do so for "those kids of mine".

To celebrate the school's 50th anniversary, a time capsule was created by students with the assistance of School Board artist-in-residence Marc Walter, a mixed-media artist from Edelweiss, Quebec. All 177 students contributed to the capsule which was publicly unveiled May 23, 2014. It is intended to be reopened after 25 years.
