= River Ward =

River
- Location within Ottawa
- Coordinates: 45°22′N 75°41′W
- Country: Canada
- Province: Ontario
- City: Ottawa

Government
  - Councillor: Riley Brockington

Population (2016)Canada 2016 Census
  - Total: 44,345

Languages (2016)
  - English: 59.6%
  - French: 10.8%
  - Arabic: 6.6%
  - Italian: 2.2%
  - Spanish: 2.2%
  - Mandarin: 2.0%
  - Cantonese: 2.0%
  - Somali: 1.2%
  - Tagalog: 1.0%

River Ward or Ward 16 (French: Quartier Rivière) is a municipal ward located in Ottawa, Ontario. It is located in the south central portion of the city, and includes the communities of Carlington, Central Park, Carleton Heights, Mooney's Bay, Riverside Park, and Hunt Club/Uplands. The ward spans both sides of the Rideau River between Carling Avenue and Hunt Club Road.

Prior to amalgamation, this area was part of Mooney's Bay Ward (Ward 8), which existed from 1994 to 2000. Before this, the ward was called Riverside Ward which was created in 1980 from parts of Elmdale-Victoria Ward and Gloucester Ward.

== City councillors ==
1. Jim Durrell (1981-1985)
2. George Brown (1986-1994)
3. Karin Howard (1995-1999)
4. Jim Bickford (1999-2000)
5. Wendy Stewart (2001-2003)
6. Maria McRae (2003-2014)
7. Riley Brockington (2014–present)

== Election results ==
=== 1980 ===
Riverside Ward
Candidate	Votes	%
Jim Durrell	3,503	48.50
Gordon Lennox	1,877	25.99
Natalie MacPhee	1,075	14.89
Sig Schmidt	767	10.62

=== 1982 ===
Riverside Ward
Candidate	Votes	%
Jim Durrell	6,856	87.53
Gregory Minion	977	12.47

=== 1985 ===
Riverside Ward
Candidate	Votes	%
George Brown	3,746	44.45
Fidel Palumbo	2,206	26.17
Marc Wallace	1,336	15.85
Tom Quinn	1,140	13.53

=== 1988 ===
Riverside Ward
Candidate	Votes	%
George Brown	4,531	85.30
Norman Van Cleaf	781	14.70

=== 1991 ===
Riverside Ward
Candidate	Votes	%
George Brown	4,140	67.88
John Ross	1,959	32.12

=== 1994 ===
Regional Council: Ward 16
Candidate	Votes	%
Wendy Stewart	7,315	72.34
Val Parkinson	2,797	27.66

City Council: Ward 8
Candidate	Votes	%
Karin Howard	3,645	35.02
Pat Murphy	3,024	29.06
Fred Bowie	1,468	14.11
Don Tudin	1,085	10.43
Riley Brockington	535	5.14
Alan Murphy	390	3.75
Coreen Fast	260	2.50

=== 1997 ===
Regional Council: River Ward
Candidate	Votes	%
Wendy Stewart	6,855	86.25
Daryl Martin	1,093	13.75

City Council: Mooney's Bay Ward
Candidate	Votes	%
Karin Howard	5,005	62.00
Kathy Ablett	3,068	38.00

=== 1999 by-election ===
A by-election was held on April 6, 1999 to replace Karin Howard who resigned her seat. Results:

City Council: Mooney's Bay Ward
Candidate	Votes	%
Jim Bickford	3,314	59.26
Frances Tanner	1,578	28.22
Wayne Kennedy	305	5.45
Scott Paterson	248	4.43
Dave Allston	147	2.63

=== 2000 ===
City council
Candidate	Votes	%
Wendy Stewart	7,091	79.95
Dave Hagerman	1,778	20.05

=== 2003 ===
City council
Candidate	Votes	%
Maria McRae	5,600	63.11
Todd Mattila-Hartman	1,654	18.64
Richard Smith	1,619	18.25

=== 2006 ===
City council
Candidate	Votes	%
Maria McRae	9,278	65.51
Blake Batson	4,885	34.49

=== 2010 ===
City council
Candidate	Votes	%
Maria McRae	7,496	59.55
Ian Boyd	1,908	15.16
Nadia Willard	1,704	13.54
Michael Kostiuk	1,480	11.76

=== 2014 ===
City council
Candidate	Vote	%
Riley Brockington	3,997	36.38
Vanessa Nicki Sutton	1,897	17.27
Mike Patton	1,427	12.99
Barbara Carroll	1,270	11.56
Antonio Giannetti	1,032	9.39
Michael Kostiuk	614	5.59
Jeff Koscik	239	2.18
Don Francis	227	2.07
Colin Pennie	171	1.56
Bruce Winchester	112	1.02

Ottawa mayor (Ward results)
Candidate	Vote	%
Jim Watson	8,501	77.76
Mike Maguire	1,852	16.94
Anwar Syed	187	1.71
Rebecca Pyrah	116	1.06
Robert White	85	0.78
Darren W. Wood	68	0.62
Bernard Couchman	65	0.59
Michael St. Arnaud	58	0.53

=== 2018 ===
City council
Candidate	Vote	%
Riley Brockington	6,122	54.50
Fabien Kalala Cimankinda	2,445	21.76
Kerri Keith	1,783	15.87
Hassib Reda	884	7.87

=== 2022 ===
City council
Candidate	Vote	%
Riley Brockington	9,595	73.08
Ethan Sabourin	2,396	18.25
Alex Dugal	1,139	8.67

=== 2026 ===
City council
Candidate	Vote	%
Riley Brockington	Acclaimed	
