= 2018 Ottawa municipal election =

Canadian municipal election

2018 Ottawa mayoral election
- October 22, 2018
- Turnout: 42.55% (▲2.63pp)
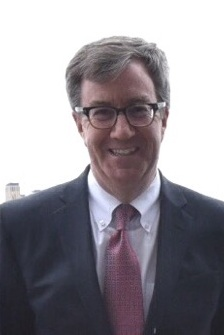

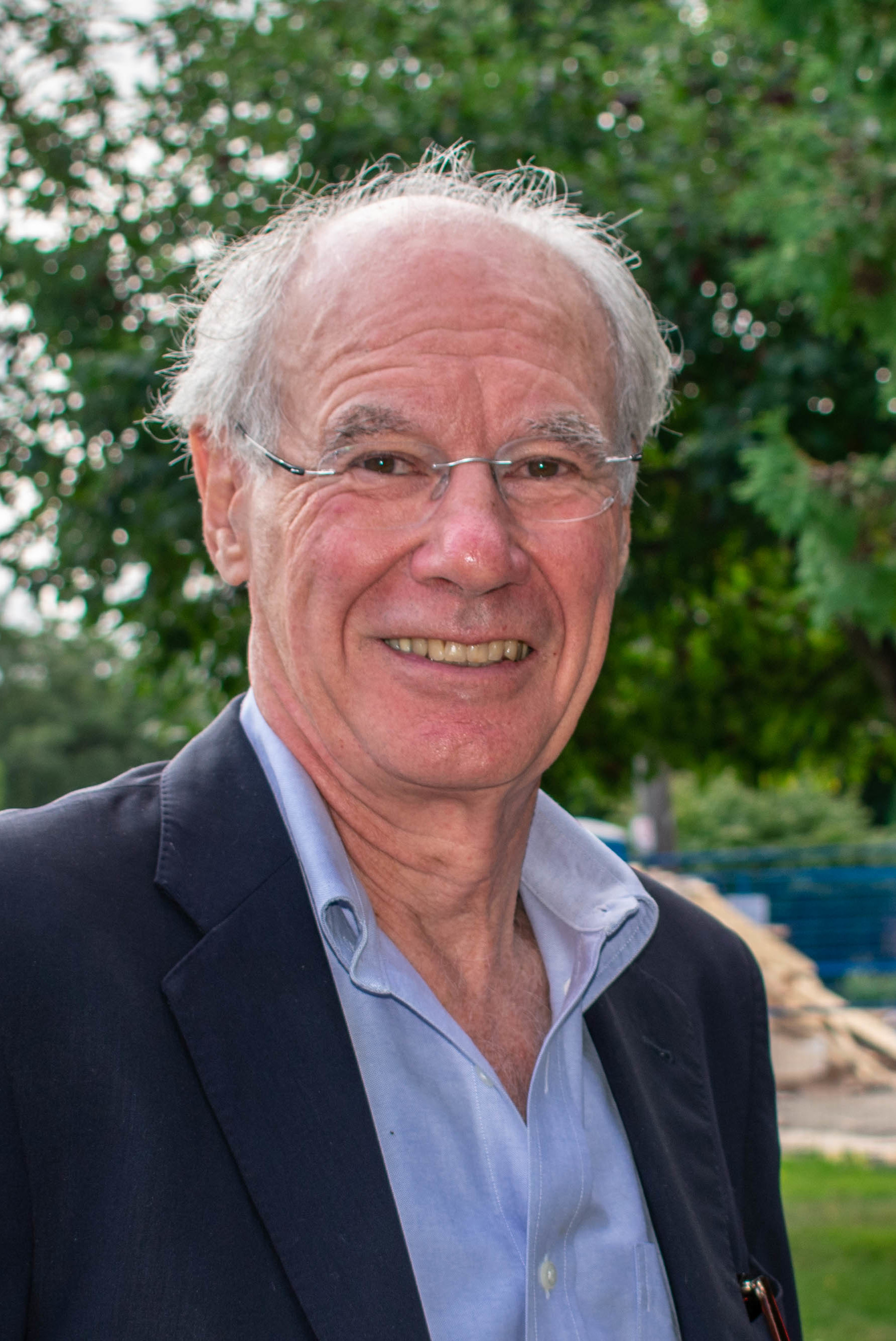
Candidate	Jim Watson	Clive Doucet
Popular vote	188,960	59,156
Percentage	71.03%	22.24%
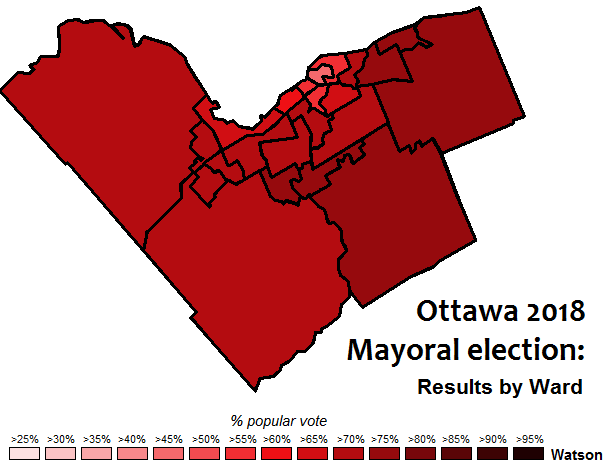
Mayor before election
Jim Watson
Elected mayor
Jim Watson

The 2018 Ottawa municipal election was a municipal election that was held on October 22, 2018, to elect the mayor of Ottawa, Ottawa City Council and the Ottawa-Carleton Public and Catholic School Boards. The election was held on the same day as elections in every other municipality in Ontario.

The electoral system used is first-past-the-post. Successful candidates do not need to have majority support of the voters in their district. Seven of the 23 successful ward councillors were elected with less than majority of votes in their districts.

== Mayoral candidates ==
=== Hamid Alakozai ===
Nominated May 10. Former CF reservist member. Considered running for president of Afghanistan in 2011. Past advisor to the attorney general of Afghanistan.

=== Ahmed Bouragba ===
Nominated July 26. Bilingual teacher and former elected Council member for the Ontario College of Teachers. Bouragba is a social justice advocate and civil liberties activist. Ran for Conseil des écoles publiques de l'Est de l'Ontario trustee in 2014. Citation: Y.B. v. Conseil des écoles publiques de l'Est de l'Ontario, 2017 HRTO 1240 (CanLII)

=== Bernard Couchman ===
Nominated May 1. Immigrant from Guyana; operates a marketing company. He ran for mayor in 2014, finishing in last place (8th) with 1,255 votes (0.51%).

=== Clive Doucet ===
Nominated July 27. City councillor for Capital Ward from 2001 to 2010. He represented Capital Ward on the Ottawa-Carleton Regional Council from 1997 to 2000. Ran for mayor in 2010.

=== Joey Drouin ===
Nominated July 27. Businessman. Running on a platform of combining Ottawa and Gatineau.

=== Ryan Lythall ===
Nominated July 9. Disabilities advocate.

=== Craig MacAulay ===
Nominated July 11. Ran for city council in 2010 and 2014 in College Ward.

=== Bruce McConville ===
Nominated July 26. Garage operator from Vanier. Ran for city council in 2003 and 2006 in Rideau-Vanier Ward. McConville was born August 30, 1962, in Eastview, Ontario (now Vanier). He dropped out of high school and would later start his garage in 1981.

=== Michael Pastien ===
Nominated May 16. Self described "futurist". Ran for city council in 2014 in Bay Ward and for public school trustee in 2010.

=== Moises Schachtler ===
Nominated July 4. A former student of the University of Ottawa.

=== James T. Sheahan ===
Nominated July 25. North Gower resident.

=== Jim Watson ===
Mayor Jim Watson had declared his intention to run for re-election in early 2017. He filed his nomination forms on May 1.

== Polls ==
Polling Date(s)	Firm	Jim Watson	Clive Doucet	Bruce McConville	Other	Undecided	Source
Aug 20–Sept 6	Probit	37	13	1	<1	49	Twitter

== Mayoral results ==
Mayoral candidate	Vote	%
Jim Watson (X)	188,960	71.03
Clive Doucet	59,156	22.24
Bruce McConville	4,360	1.64
Craig MacAulay	2,272	0.85
Ahmed Bouragba	1,912	0.72
Joey Drouin	1,893	0.71
Hamid Alakozai	1,867	0.70
James T. Sheahan	1,354	0.51
Michael Pastien	1,177	0.44
Ryan Lythall	1,115	0.42
Moises Schachtler	994	0.37
Bernard Couchman	964	0.36

=== Results by ward ===
Ward	Alakozai	Bouragba	Couchman	Doucet	Drouin	Lythall	MacAulay	McConville	Pastien	Schachtler	Sheahan	Watson
Orléans	64	79	51	2278	133	43	123	259	51	39	79	11203
Innes	76	61	35	2155	106	52	71	196	50	36	30	9261
Barrhaven	121	128	35	2176	72	58	123	123	112	44	66	11044
Kanata North	64	86	33	1935	54	31	87	107	128	40	51	7606
West Carleton-March	23	18	26	1544	37	31	75	110	24	17	55	5429
Stittsville	36	25	39	1868	50	47	85	129	25	31	74	7215
Bay	143	123	62	2559	83	61	126	158	39	55	55	7946
College	98	64	61	2873	63	98	175	189	57	56	85	10068
Knoxdale-Merivale	50	36	33	1922	55	43	91	90	29	53	58	7047
Gloucester-Southgate	112	270	36	1754	69	52	74	110	38	30	53	6665
Beacon Hill-Cyrville	69	50	50	1666	71	25	51	215	42	34	34	5799
Rideau-Vanier	76	95	74	3915	139	44	84	719	49	52	37	4869
Rideau-Rockcliffe	72	53	49	3123	98	28	55	430	38	39	39	5120
Somerset	76	65	26	3212	85	52	53	85	16	54	27	5424
Kitchissippi	54	43	32	4469	80	39	68	108	28	40	41	8719
River	113	120	48	2392	73	38	72	140	29	47	43	7682
Capital	71	60	31	4656	82	45	66	109	25	45	46	6890
Alta Vista	88	75	23	2729	81	50	86	147	34	52	43	7898
Cumberland	87	85	41	1538	120	32	73	164	49	35	49	8916
Osgoode	21	24	30	1394	64	45	130	155	31	37	84	6149
Rideau-Goulbourn	22	24	25	1646	50	39	130	145	22	20	108	6547
Gloucester-South Nepean	113	170	39	1901	64	45	116	124	151	29	72	10043
Kanata South	99	48	36	2454	66	55	132	161	60	48	73	9678
Special/Advance (No Ward)	119	110	49	2997	98	62	126	187	50	61	52	11742

== City Council ==
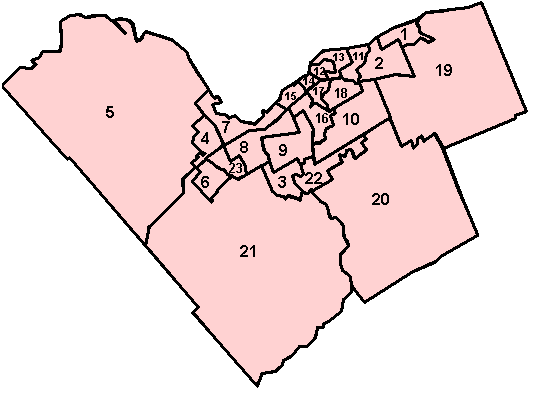
Map of Ottawa's Wards.: 1. Orléans Ward; 2. Innes Ward; 3. Barrhaven Ward; 4. Kanata North Ward; 5. West Carleton-March Ward; 6. Stittsville Ward; 7. Bay Ward; 8. College Ward; 9. Knoxdale-Merivale Ward; 10. Gloucester-Southgate Ward; 11. Beacon Hill-Cyrville Ward; 12. Rideau-Vanier Ward; 13. Rideau-Rockcliffe Ward; 14. Somerset Ward; 15. Kitchissippi Ward; 16. River Ward; 17. Capital Ward; 18. Alta Vista Ward; 19. Cumberland Ward; 20. Osgoode Ward; 21. Rideau-Goulbourn Ward; 22. Gloucester-South Nepean Ward; 23. Kanata South Ward.

=== Orléans Ward ===
- Incumbent councillor Bob Monette had indicated he would be running for re-election but dropped out on June 13.

Nominated candidates

- ~~Bob Monette~~ - incumbent councillor
- Rick Bédard
- Toby Bossert
- Mireille Brownhill - Community association executive, not-for-profit coordinator, community volunteer.
- Guy Desroches
- Diego Elizondo
- Dina Epale
- ~~Doug Feltmate~~ - Former president of the Ottawa-Orléans Provincial Liberal Association. Withdrew, but will be on the ballot.
- Jarrod Goldsmith - Canadian small business community builder. Holds a master's degree in Anthropology from the University of Alberta. Musician and entrepreneur; founder of Sax Appeal and eSAX (The Entrepreneur Social Advantage Experience),
- Miranda Gray
- Geoffrey Nicholas Griplas
- Catherine Kitts - former editor of the Orléans Star newspaper, advocating to see more women elected to Ottawa City Council. Graduate of Carleton University's renowned School of Journalism.
- Shannon Kramer
- Matthew Luloff - Canadian Forces veteran, served in Afghanistan, formerly worked for several Members of Parliament and most recently for the Minister of National Defence. Holds a degree in Public Affairs and Policy Management. Mental Health advocate. Member of the Liberal Party of Canada.
- Qamar Masood
- ~~Louise Soyez~~ withdrew, but will be on the ballot
- Kevin Tetreault
- Don Yetman

Results:

Council candidate	Vote	%
Matthew Luloff	3,622	23.76
Catherine Kitts	3,358	22.02
Rick Bédard	2,799	18.36
Mireille Brownhill	1,900	12.46
Kevin Tetreault	685	4.49
Diego Elizondo	399	2.62
Qamar Masood	393	2.58
Jarrod Goldsmith	357	2.34
Dina Epale	336	2.20
Shannon Kramer	333	2.18
Guy Desroches	328	2.15
Miranda Gray	238	1.56
Don Yetman	212	1.39
Doug Feltmate	102	0.67
Toby Bossert	73	0.48
Geoffrey Nicholas Griplas	65	0.43
Louise Soyez	47	0.31

=== Innes Ward ===
Incumbent councillor Jody Mitic announced he would not be running for re-election.

Nominated candidates:

- Laura Dudas - ran in 2014. Former journalist. President of the Blackburn Community Association and member of the Orleans Chamber of Commerce.
- Donna Leith-Gudbranson - campaign manager and assistant to former councillor Rainer Bloess. President of the Chapel Hill South Community Association and the school council at École élémentaire publique Le Prélude.
- Tammy Lynch - assistant to previous councillor, Jody Mitic (director of community relations)
- François Trépanier - Consultant. Served for 28 years in the Canadian Forces. Ran in 2014.

Results:

Council candidate	Vote	%
Laura Dudas	5,325	41.37
Donna Leith-Gudbranson	3,645	28.32
François Trépanier	2,391	18.58
Tammy Lynch	1,510	11.73

=== Barrhaven Ward ===
Nominated candidates

- Franklin Epape - teacher at La Cité collégiale and president of the board of Cooperation Integration Canada
- Jan Harder - incumbent councillor.
- Ahmad Malgarai
- Atiq Qureshi - works in income tax consulting
- Hadi Wess - former president of the Student Federation of the University of Ottawa

Results:

Council candidate	Vote	%
Jan Harder (X)	11,489	74.27
Hadi Wess	2,427	15.69
Franklin Epape	908	5.87
Atiq Qureshi	535	3.46
Ahmad Malgarai	110	0.71

=== Kanata North Ward ===
Incumbent councillor Marianne Wilkinson had announced she would not be running for re-election.

Nominated candidates:

- Philip Bloedow
- David Gourlay - former president of the Ottawa Champions baseball team.
- Matt Muirhead - teacher, 2014 candidate
- Lorne Neufeldt
- Jenna Sudds - Former executive director of the Kanata North business improvement association. Endorsed by Wilkinson.

Results:

Council candidate	Vote	%
Jenna Sudds	5,298	46.68
Matt Muirhead	3,634	32.02
David Gourlay	2,335	20.57
Lorne Neufeldt	56	0.49
Philip Bloedow	27	0.24

=== West Carleton-March Ward ===
Nominated candidates:

- Eli El-Chantiry - incumbent city councillor
- James Parsons - Ran in this ward in 2010 and 2014.
- Judi Varga-Toth - small business owner and executive director

Results:

Council candidate	Vote	%
Eli El-Chantiry (X)	5,099	65.90
Judi Varga-Toth	2,132	27.56
James Parsons	506	6.54

=== Stittsville Ward ===
Nominated candidates:

- Glen Gower - director of marketing and communications and founder of a local community blog.
- Shad Qadri - incumbent city councillor

Results:

Council candidate	Vote	%
Glen Gower	5,877	57.86
Shad Qadri (X)	4,280	42.14

=== Bay Ward ===
Incumbent councillor Mark Taylor did not run for re-election.

Nominated candidates:

- Erica Dath - background in "finance and public service"
- Don Dransfield - management consultant. Husband of incumbent Ottawa West—Nepean MP Anita Vandenbeld. Ran for the Ontario Liberal Party in Nepean—Carleton in the 2011 Ontario general election. Also ran for city council in 2006.
- Theresa Kavanagh - incumbent OCDSB trustee, NDP staffer, and wife of former city councillor Alex Cullen Ran for a seat as the NDP candidate in the House of Commons of Canada in the 1988 federal election in Ottawa West.
- Marc Lugert - former chair of the Queensway Terrace Community Association and current vice president of the Ottawa Girls Hockey Association
- Trevor Robinson - Ran in the 2014 municipal election.

Results:

Council candidate	Vote	%
Theresa Kavanagh	6,509	55.17
Don Dransfield	2,104	17.83
Erica Dath	1,793	15.20
Marc Lugert	851	7.21
Trevor Robinson	541	4.59

=== College Ward ===
Nominated candidates:

- Rick Chiarelli - incumbent city councillor
- Emilie Coyle - lawyer; director of the Refugee Sponsorship Program
- Ryan Kennery - communications strategist; former director of communications for mayor Jim Watson

Results:

Council candidate	Vote	%
Rick Chiarelli (X)	7,079	46.79
Emilie Coyle	5,751	38.01
Ryan Kennery	2,299	15.20

=== Knoxdale-Merivale Ward ===
Nominated candidates:

- Warren Arshinoff - former member of the Ottawa Youth Cabinet for Ward 9 (2001-2004)
- James Dean - real-estate agent and board member of Quality Living House Cooperative
- Keith Egli - incumbent city councillor
- Luigi Mangone - public servant
- Peter Anthony Weber - heavy equipment operator.

City council
Candidate	Vote	%
Keith Egli (X)	6,369	63.12
James Dean	2,002	19.84
Luigi Mangone	1,114	11.04
Warren Arshinoff	342	3.39
Peter Anthony Weber	264	2.62

=== Gloucester-Southgate Ward ===
Nominated candidates:

- Diane Deans - incumbent city councillor
- Alek Golijanin
- Perry Sabourin - Social Worker
- Sam Soucy - Executive assistant for Liberal MP Fayçal El-Khoury.
- Robert Swaita - Restaurant owner

City council
Candidate	Vote	%
Diane Deans (X)	6,179	56.08
Robert Swaita	3,435	31.17
Alek Golijanin	875	7.94
Sam Soucy	342	3.10
Perry Sabourin	188	1.71

=== Beacon Hill-Cyrville Ward ===
Nominated candidates:

- Michael Schurter - Realtor and parliamentary office manager for Conservative MP Peter Kent.
- Tim Tierney - incumbent councillor

Results:

Council candidate	Vote	%
Tim Tierney (X)	6,730	81.34
Michael Schurter	1,544	18.66

=== Rideau-Vanier Ward ===
Nominated candidates:

- Salar Changiz
- Mathieu Fleury - incumbent councillor.
- Thierry Harris - former vice president of the Lower Town Community Association. Former producer for CBC/Radio Canada and press officer for the National Film Board.
- Matt Lowe - Veteran and member of the Conservative Party of Canada.

Results:

Council candidate	Vote	%
Mathieu Fleury (X)	7,302	68.08
Thierry Harris	3,050	28.44
Matt Lowe	285	2.66
Salar Changiz	88	0.82

=== Rideau-Rockcliffe Ward ===
- Peter Heyck
- Tobi Nussbaum - incumbent city councillor

Results:

Council candidate	Vote	%
Tobi Nussbaum (X)	7,334	80.52
Peter Heyck	1,774	19.48

=== Somerset Ward ===
Nominated candidates:

- Arthur David - public servant
- Jerry Kovacs - human rights lawyer
- Catherine McKenney - incumbent councillor
- Merdod Zopyrus - Carleton University student

Results:

Council candidate	Vote	%
Catherine McKenney (X)	7,754	76.66
Jerry Kovacs	1,461	14.44
Arthur David	701	6.93
Merdod Zopyrus	199	1.97

=== Kitchissippi Ward ===
Nominated candidates:

- Jeff Leiper - incumbent councillor.
- Daniel Stringer - former aide to Liberal MPP Richard Patten. Has run in this ward in 2003, 2006 (dropping out) and 2010.

Results:

Council candidate	Vote	%
Jeff Leiper (X)	12,068	85.28
Daniel Stringer	2,083	14.72

=== River Ward ===
Incumbent councillor Riley Brockington ran for re-election

Nominated candidates:

- Riley Brockington - incumbent city councillor
- Fabien Kalala Cimankinda - entrepreneur
- Kerri Keith - NAC box-office supervisor and economics student
- Hassib Reda - Finance commissioner of the University of Ottawa Graduate Student Association

Results:

Council candidate	Vote	%
Riley Brockington (X)	6,122	54.50
Fabien Kalala Cimankinda	2,445	21.76
Kerri Keith	1,783	15.87
Hassib Reda	884	7.87

=== Capital Ward ===
Incumbent councillor David Chernushenko ran for re-election.

Nominated candidates

- Jide Afolabi - lawyer/negotiator
- Anthony Carricato - policy analyst. Former vice president of the Glebe Community Association who works in the office of the Speaker of the House of Commons of Canada. Member of the Liberal Party of Canada.
- David Chernushenko - incumbent city councillor.
- Christine McAllister - business director. President of the Glebe Community Association. Endorsed by Ottawa Centre MP Catherine McKenna. Also a member of the Liberal Party.
- Shawn Menard - incumbent Ottawa-Carleton District School Board trustee. Endorsed by Ottawa Centre MPP Joel Harden.

Results:

Council candidate	Vote	%
Shawn Menard	3,575	28.12
Christine McAllister	3,198	25.15
David Chernushenko (X)	2,970	23.36
Anthony Carricato	2,451	19.28
Jide Afolabi	520	4.09

=== Alta Vista Ward ===
Incumbent councillor Jean Cloutier ran for re-election

Nominated candidates:

- Jean Cloutier - incumbent city councillor
- Clinton Cowan - Labour relations expert. 2010 and 2014 candidate in this ward
- Kevin Kit - Auditor. President of the Elmvale Acres Community Association.
- Raylene Lang-Dion - Federal public servant. Former chair of Equal Voice. Past member of the Liberal Party of Canada.
- Mike McHarg - gay rights activist
- John Redins - 2014 candidate and former Party for People with Special Needs provincial and federal Green Party candidate.

Results:

Council candidate	Vote	%
Jean Cloutier (X)	3,866	32.81
Raylene Lang-Dion	3,665	31.10
Kevin Kit	2,616	22.20
Clinton Cowan	1,415	12.01
John Redins	127	1.08
Mike McHarg	84	0.80

=== Cumberland Ward ===
- Incumbent councillor Stephen Blais ran for re-election.

Nominated candidates:

- Stephen Blais - incumbent councillor.
- Jensen Boire
- Cameron Rose Jette - Human rights/social justice student at Carleton University.

Results:

Council candidate	Vote	%
Stephen Blais (X)	11,230	89.08
Cameron Rose Jette	741	5.88
Jensen Boire	636	5.04

=== Osgoode Ward ===
Nominated candidates:

- Auguste Banfalvi
- George Darouze - incumbent city councillor
- Mark Scharfe - Cattle farmer and former police officer. Ran in this ward in 2014.
- Kim Sheldrick - Stay at home mother and volunteer. Ran in this ward in 2014
- Jay Tysick - Leader of the Ontario Party and Candidate for Carleton in 2018 Ontario Election. Former interim leader of the Ontario Alliance. 2018 Ontario PC nomination candidate for Carleton. Former aide to councillor Rick Chiarelli.

Results:

Council candidate	Vote	%
George Darouze (X)	4,653	54.86
Jay Tysick	2,694	31.76
Mark Scharfe	603	7.11
Kim Sheldrick	504	5.94
Auguste Banfalvi	28	0.33

=== Rideau-Goulbourn Ward ===
Nominated candidates:

- David Brown - Former assistant to incumbent councillor Scott Moffatt, former president of the Richmond Agricultural Society and former staffer for Conservative MP Pierre Poilievre.
- Scott Moffatt - incumbent city councillor

Results:

Council candidate	Vote	%
Scott Moffatt (X)	5,080	55.81
David Brown	4,023	44.19

=== Gloucester-South Nepean Ward ===
Nominated candidates:

- Zaff Ansari - IT Professor; NDP candidate for Nepean in 2018 Ontario Election
- Carol Anne Meehan - former CTV Ottawa news anchor
- Irene Mei
- Michael Qaqish - incumbent councillor
- Harpreet Singh - Academic manager at Algonquin College

Results:

Council candidate	Vote	%
Carol Anne Meehan	5,960	42.55
Michael Qaqish (X)	5,420	38.69
Harpreet Singh	2,152	15.36
Zaff Ansari	358	2.56
Irene Mei	118	0.84

=== Kanata South Ward ===
Nominated candidates:

- Steve Anderson - Public servant/analyst. President of the Katimavik-Hazeldean Community Association.
- Mike Brown - Accountant
- Allan Hubley - incumbent city councillor
- Doug Large - Sales and marketing manager

Results:

Council candidate	Vote	%
Allan Hubley (X)	6,183	45.53
Steve Anderson	4,274	31.47
Mike Brown	2,978	21.93
Doug Large	146	1.08

== School Board Trustee ==
=== Ottawa Catholic School Board ===
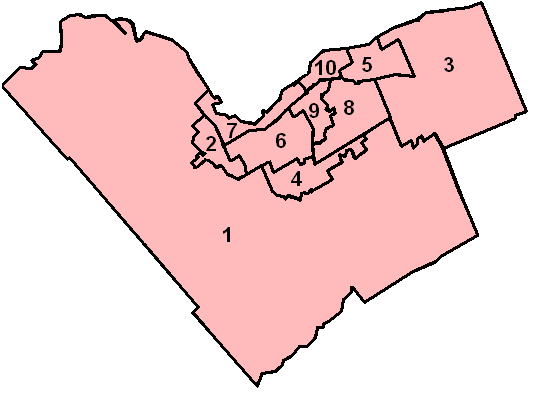
Zone map

Zone 1

Zone 1	Vote	%
John Curry (X)	Acclaimed	

Zone 2

Zone 2	Vote	%
Sandra Moore (X)	3,259	69.53
Michael Olsen	717	15.30
Kevin Sawyer	711	15.17

Zone 3

Zone 3	Vote	%
Brian Coburn (X)	Acclaimed	

Zone 4

Zone 4	Vote	%
Spencer Warren (X)	Acclaimed	

Zone 5

Zone 5	Vote	%
Joanne MacEwan (X)	Acclaimed	

Zone 6

Zone 6	Vote	%
Glen Armstrong	2,613	54.59
Jeff Darwin	2,174	45.41

Zone 7

Zone 7	Vote	%
Jeremy Wittet (X)	Acclaimed	

Zone 8

Zone 8	Vote	%
Mark D. Mullan (X)	Acclaimed	

Zone 9

Zone 9	Vote	%
Shelley Lawrence	2,491	82.92
Regan Preszcator (X)	513	17.08

Zone 10

Zone 10	Vote	%
Thérèse Maloney-Cousineau (X)	1,093	50.09
Cindy Desclouds-Simpson	1,089	49.91

=== Ottawa-Carleton District School Board ===
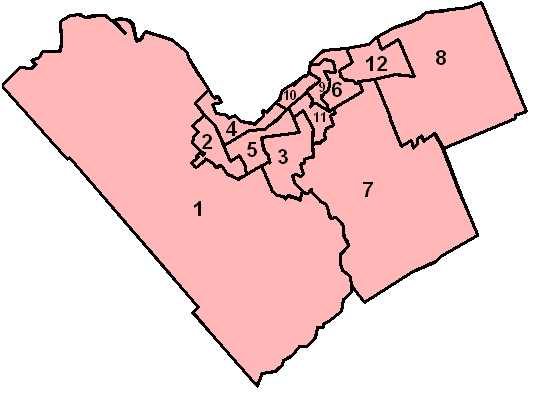
OCDSB Zone Map

Zone 1

Zone 1	Vote	%
Lynn Scott (X)	11,540	64.84
John Flemming	3,793	21.31
Ken Lumsden	1,048	5.89
Brandon Rabideau	812	4.56
Gurprit Kindra	604	3.39

Zone 2

Zone 2	Vote	%
Christine Boothby (X)	10,797	66.34
Adam Grodinsky	2,818	17.31
Waleed Qirbi	2,660	16.34

Zone 3

Zone 3	Vote	%
Donna Blackburn (X)	6,300	39.96
Amy Wellings	4,501	28.55
Amanda Purdy	2,954	18.74
Patricia Kmiec	1,091	6.92
Alex Sivasambu	921	5.84

Zone 4

Zone 4	Vote	%
Wendy Hough	5,497	66.65
Dragos Popa	1,387	16.82
Fraser Anderson	1,363	16.53

Zone 5

Zone 5	Vote	%
Rob Campbell	5,983	65.08
C. J. Blake	2,470	26.87
Nicholas Lapierre	741	8.06

Zone 6

Zone 6	Vote	%
Chris Ellis (X)	5,883	48.28
Marty Carr	4,216	34.60
Tanya Melissa Dasilva	2,085	17.11

Zone 7

Zone 7	Vote	%
Jennifer Jennekens	6,857	52.74
Kim Woods	6,144	47.26

Zone 8

Zone 8	Vote	%
Keith Penny (X)	6,175	55.13
John Hewitt	5,025	44.87

Zone 9

Zone 9	Vote	%
Lyra Evans	7,603	55.33
Rose LaBrèche	6,139	44.67

Zone 10

Zone 10	Vote	%
Erica Braunovan (X)	11,935	72.86
Wesley Campbell	1,620	9.89
David Thomas Humphries	1,582	9.66
Justin W. Laku	1,243	7.59

Zone 11

Zone 11	Vote	%
Mark Fisher (X)	6,506	50.42
Elaine Hayles	4,352	33.73
Travis Croken	2,045	15.85

Zone 12

Zone 12	Vote	%
Sandra Schwartz (X)	7,265	74.31
Rawlson King	2,511	25.69

=== Conseil des écoles catholiques du Centre-Est ===
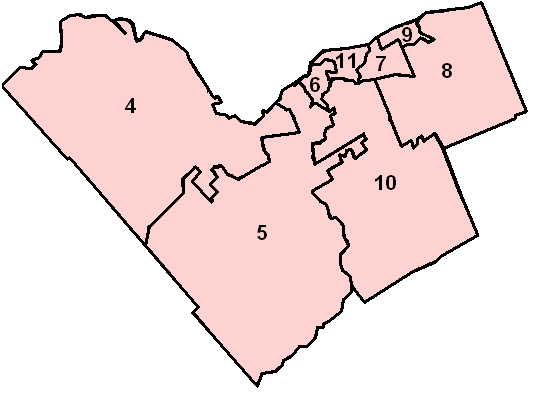
Zone map

Zone 4

Zone 4	Vote	%
Jolène Savoie-Day	1,475	66.80
Loree-Ann Huard	733	33.20

Zone 5

Zone 5	Vote	%
Chad Mariage (X)	Acclaimed	

Zone 6

Zone 6	Vote	%
Valérie Assoi	Acclaimed	

Zone 7

Zone 7	Vote	%
Robert Rainboth	Acclaimed	

Zone 8

Zone 8	Vote	%
Dan Boudria (X)	3,037	79.15
Cynthia Wagner	448	11.68
Nenette Ntema-Mbudi	352	9.17

Zone 9

Zone 9	Vote	%
Johanne Lacombe (X)	Acclaimed	

Zone 10

Zone 10	Vote	%
Monique Briand (X)	Acclaimed	

Zone 11

Zone 11	Vote	%
André Thibodeau	Acclaimed	

=== Conseil des écoles publiques de l'Est de l'Ontario ===
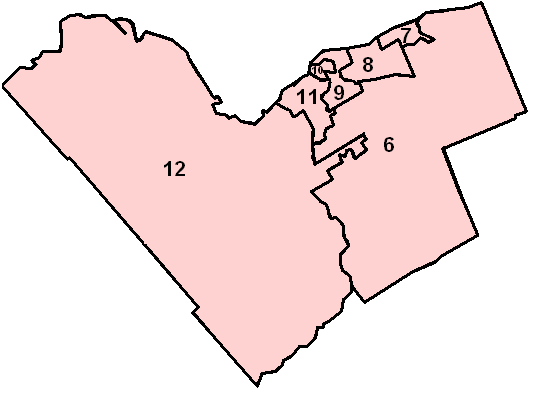
Zone map

Zone 6

Zone 6	Vote	%
Roda Muse	Acclaimed	

Zone 7

Zone 7	Vote	%
Denis Chartrand (X)	1,357	73.79
Sean Curran	482	26.21

Zone 8

Zone 8	Vote	%
Marc Roy (X)	Acclaimed	

Zone 9

Zone 9	Vote	%
Marielle Godbout (X)	1,671	79.34
Abdourahman Kahin	435	20.66

Zone 10

Zone 10	Vote	%
Lucille Collard (X)	Acclaimed	

Zone 11

Zone 11	Vote	%
Jacinthe Marcil	734	43.87
Myriam Hebabi	519	31.02
Marc Bissonnette	420	25.10

Zone 12

Zone 12	Vote	%
Samia Ouled Ali	772	50.99
Denis Labrèche	742	49.01
