= Orléans East-Cumberland Ward =

Orléans East-Cumberland
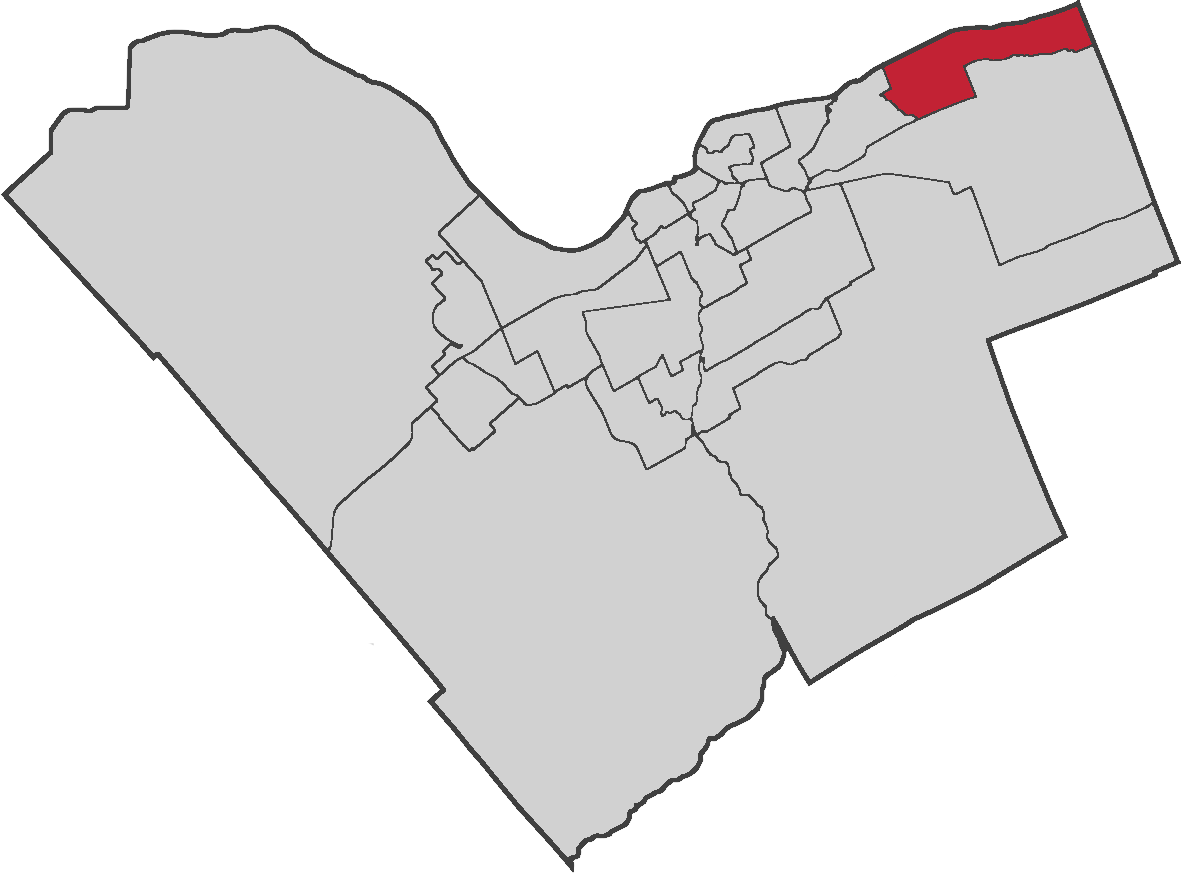
- Location within Ottawa
- Coordinates: 45°28.5′N 75°30.0′W
- Country: Canada
- Province: Ontario
- City: Ottawa

Government
  - Councillor: Matthew Luloff

Population (2022)
  - Total: 50,504

Languages (2016)
  - English: 57.7%
  - French: 32.3%
  - Arabic: 1.7%
  - Spanish: 1.2%

Orléans East-Cumberland Ward (Ward 1) is a city ward in the city of Ottawa, Ontario, Canada, represented on Ottawa City Council. It was created before the 2000 Election when the area was amalgamated into the city of Ottawa. The ward covers much of the suburban community of Orleans in the east of the city. Previous to that, the ward existed in the Regional Municipality of Ottawa-Carleton Council. It contains the neighbourhoods of Queenswood Heights, Queenswood Village, Fallingbrook, Cardinal Creek, Cardinal Creek Village, Bella Vista and Cumberland Village.

== History ==
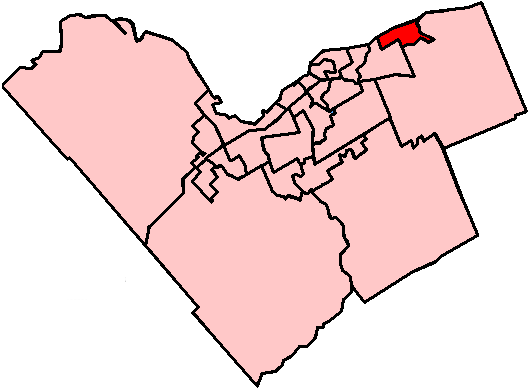
Map of Orléans Ward (2006–2022)

From 2006 to 2022, it was known as Orléans Ward, and contained the neighbourhoods of Convent Glen, Convent Glen South, Hiawatha Park, Orleans Wood, Riverglen, Queenswood Village, Chatelaine Village, River Walk, Queenswood Heights, Queenswood South, Fallingbrook and the eastern part of the Cardinal Creek neighbourhood (east of Trim Road). Not all of Orleans was in the ward, as some of it is in Cumberland Ward and Innes Ward. It covered an area of 25.2 km^{2} (9.7 sq mi). When the Ward boundaries changed for the 2006 election, there was only a small change to the ward boundary on Portobello.

The ward was represented by Bob Monette from 2006 to 2018. He was elected in a by-election when the ward was vacated by Herb Kreling in September 2005. Kreling had held the seat since its inception. Montette won the by-election in January 2006. Monette retired in 2018, and the ward has been represented by Matthew Luloff ever since.

Following the 2020 Ottawa Ward boundary review, the ward's southern boundary became Innes Road, and the ward expanded eastward to include Cumberland Village, and lost the Convent Glen neighbourhood, as its western border shifted to Champlain Street north of Highway 174 and Bilberry Creek south of Highway 174.

== Demographics ==
According to the 2011 Canadian census

The Ward's population was 47,670.

Ethnic groups: 81.4% White, 5.5% Black, 3.0% South Asian, 2.8% Aboriginal, 1.9% Arab, 1.7% Chinese
Languages: 59.6% English, 31.7% French, 1.5% Arabic, 1.0% Chinese
Religions: 78.2% Christian (53.7% Catholic, 6.7% United Church, 5.8% Anglican, 1.5% Presbyterian, 1.3% Pentecostal, 1.1% Baptist, 8.1% Other), 3.1% Muslim, 1.1% Hindu, 16.5% No religion
Median income (2010): $45,285
Average income (2010): $50,954

== Regional and city councillors ==
- Prior to 1994, the area was represented by the mayors of Cumberland and Gloucester and 2 at large Gloucester city and regional councillors. From 1994 to 2000, the area was covered by Queenswood and Fallingbrook Wards on Cumberland City Council and Orléans North Ward on Gloucester City Council.
1. Herb Kreling (1994–2005)
2. Bob Monette (2006–2018)
3. Matthew Luloff (2018–present)

== Election results ==
=== 1994 Ottawa-Carleton Regional Municipality elections ===
Regional council
Candidate	Votes	%
Herb Kreling	3275	30.37
Bob Monette	3252	30.16
Keith De Cruz	3118	28.92
Bernard Pelot	766	7.10
Stan Lamothe	371	3.44

=== 1997 Ottawa-Carleton Regional Municipality elections ===
Regional council
Candidate	Votes	%
Herb Kreling	3648	41.39
Keith De Cruz	2730	30.98
Pierre Cantin	2435	27.63

=== 2000 Ottawa municipal election ===
Following amalgamation, regional councillor Herb Kreling defeated Cumberland City Councillors John Morgan (Queenswood Ward) and Gerry Lalonde (Heritage Ward).

City council
Candidate	Votes	%
Herb Kreling	7029	40.96
John Morgan	5564	32.42
Gerry Lalonde	4569	26.62

Ottawa Mayor (Ward results)
Candidate	Votes	%
Claudette Cain	10819	62.35
Bob Chiarelli	6129	35.32
Marc-André Belair	180	1.04
Georges Saade	93	0.54
Ken Mills	41	0.24
James A. Hall	31	0.18
Paula Nemchin	29	0.17
John Turmel	19	0.11
Morteza Naini	10	0.06

=== 2003 Ottawa municipal election ===
City council
Candidate	Votes	%
Herb Kreling	7,182	72.89
Louise Malloy	2,671	27.11

Ottawa Mayor (Ward results)
Candidate	Votes	%
Bob Chiarelli	5,700	57.44
Terry Kilrea	3,553	35.80
Ike Awgu	274	2.76
Ron Burke	126	1.27
Paula Nemchin	75	0.76
Donna Upson	69	0.70
John A. Bell	66	0.67
John Turmel	61	0.61

=== 2006 by-election ===
Held on January 9 to replace the out going Herb Kreling.

Candidates

- Elena Harder: Daughter of Bell-South Nepean Ward councillor Jan Harder
- Debbie Jodoin: Socially Conservative political activist
- Sheryl MacDonald: Orleans/Cumberland Public School Board Trustee 1997-2005, as well as former Human Rights Commissioner, provincial Labour Relations Board Member, United Way Director, Family Services Association Board Member, Citizen Advocacy Board Member, and Human Resources manager for Air Canada (28 years).
- Pierre Maheu president of the Orléans Parks and Recreation Association and a member of the City of Ottawa's Committee of Adjustment, ran for regional council in 1997 (Innes Ward), and in 2002 dropped out of the race for the Liberal Party of Ontario nomination in Ottawa—Orléans.
- Louise Malloy: Seniors advocate and a retired military sergeant. Ran in the 2003 election, and lost to Herb Kreling.
- Bob Monette: Former Cumberland Township councillor (1985–1991). Ran for regional council in 1994 but lost.
- Gino L. Nicolini Owner of Nicolini Construction and Engineering Ltd. as well as several pizza shops in and around Ottawa namely Nicolini PizzaLand.
- Michel Tardif Fringe candidate

Dropped out

- Don Rivington - ran in Bay Ward in the 2003 election. Opted to run in mayoral race instead, to forward is one issue candidacy (that Ottawa should get an ombudsman)

Results

City council
Candidate	Votes	%
Bob Monette	2891	34.15
Sheryl MacDonald	2026	23.93
Elena Harder	1738	20.53
Louise Malloy	578	6.83
Debbie Jodoin	457	5.40
Pierre Maheu	409	4.83
Gino L. Nicolini	307	3.63
Michel Tardif	60	0.71

=== 2006 Ottawa municipal election ===
After facing seven candidates in the January by-election, incumbent councillor Bob Monette, faced off against Dennis Vowles, son of former Gloucester city councillor Ken Vowles.

City council
Candidate	Votes	%
Bob Monette	12,201	69.98
Dennis Vowles	5,235	30.02

Ottawa Mayor (Ward results)
Candidate	Votes	%
Larry O'Brien	8,928	50.01
Alex Munter	6,422	35.97
Bob Chiarelli	2,325	13.02
Jane Scharf	78	0.44
Piotr Anweiler	44	0.25
Robert Larter	32	0.18
Barkley Pollock	23	0.13

=== 2010 Ottawa municipal election ===
City council
Candidate	Votes	%
Bob Monette	9728	59.99
Fred Sherwin	3939	24.35
Jennifer Robitaille	2326	14.34
Renee Greenberg	212	1.31

Ottawa Mayor (Ward results)
Candidate	Votes	%
Jim Watson	8,685	53.26
Larry O'Brien	3,937	24.14
Clive Doucet	1,918	11.76
Andrew S. Haydon	939	5.76
Mike Maguire	332	2.04
Robert G. Gauthier	132	0.81
Jane Scharf	84	0.52
Charlie Taylor	52	0.32
Cesar Bello	51	0.31
Idris Ben-Tahir	27	0.17
Robin Lawrance	27	0.17
Sean Ryan	27	0.17
Robert Larter	18	0.11
Michael St. Arnaud	17	0.10
Joseph Furtenbacher	14	0.09
Daniel J. Lyrette	14	0.09
Samuel Wright	14	0.09
Julio Pita	8	0.05
Vincent Libweshya	6	0.04
Fraser Liscumb	6	0.04

=== 2014 Ottawa municipal election ===
City council
Candidate	Vote	%
Bob Monette	10,662	75.47
Jennifer Robitaille	2,546	18.02
R. Gordon Jensen	919	6.51

Ottawa mayor (Ward results)
Candidate	Vote	%
Jim Watson	10,536	80.72
Mike Maguire	1,935	14.82
Rebecca Pyrah	127	0.97
Michael St. Arnaud	125	0.96
Darren W. Wood	96	0.74
Anwar Syed	92	0.70
Robert White	86	0.66
Bernard Couchman	56	0.43

=== 2018 Ottawa municipal election ===
In 2018, Orleans Ward had 17 candidate names on the ballot, a record. Two candidates, Doug Feltmate and Louise Soyez, withdrew late in the campaign, reducing the active names to 15.

Council candidate	Vote	%
Matthew Luloff	3,622	23.76
Catherine Kitts	3,358	22.02
Rick Bédard	2,799	18.36
Mireille Brownhill	1,900	12.46
Kevin Tetreault	685	4.49
Diego Elizondo	399	2.62
Qamar Masood	393	2.58
Jarrod Goldsmith	357	2.34
Dina Epale	336	2.20
Shannon Kramer	333	2.18
Guy Desroches	328	2.15
Miranda Gray	238	1.56
Don Yetman	212	1.39
Doug Feltmate	102	0.67
Toby Bossert	73	0.48
Geoffrey Nicholas Griplas	65	0.43
Louise Soyez	47	0.31

=== 2022 Ottawa municipal election ===
Council candidate	Vote	%
Matthew Luloff	11,919	74.17
Rosemee Cantave	2,376	14.79
Tessa Franklin	1,775	11.05

=== 2026 Ottawa municipal election ===
2026 Ottawa municipal election: Orléans East-Cumberland
Candidate	Popular vote			Expenditures
Candidate	Votes	%	±%	Expenditures
Matt Luloff (X)	6,337	36.41	-37.76	
Bob Bell	4,308	24.75	–	
Barbara Daniela Gandolfo	2,578	14.81	–	
Yvette Ashiri	1,713	9.84	–	
Sherif Rizk	1,019	5.85	–	
Mazhar Choudhry	776	4.46	–	
Tammie Trellert	674	3.87	–	
Total valid votes	17,557			
Total rejected, unmarked and declined votes				
Turnout		39.84		
Eligible voters	44,068			
Note: Candidate campaign colours are based on the prominent colour used in campaign items (signs, literature, etc.) and are used as a visual differentiation between candidates.
