= Our Lady of Wisdom Catholic School =

Our Lady Of Wisdom Catholic Elementary School

Location
- 1565 St. Georges Street; Orleans, Ontario, K1E 1R2; Canada
- 45.4676°N 75.5009°W

Information
- School type: Catholic elementary
- Founded: 1972
- School board: Ottawa Catholic School Board
- Superintendent: Sean Power
- Area trustee: Brian Coburn
- School number: 613-824-9700
- Principal: Julie Kerr
- Grades: JK - Grade 6
- Enrollment: approx 520 (January 2024)
- Language: English
- Area: Ottawa
- Colours: Gold, and blue
- Website: www.wis.ocsb.ca

Our Lady of Wisdom Catholic School is a Canadian elementary school in the Orleans area of Ottawa, Ontario.

== School history ==
The school officially opened its doors on September 4, 1972 and was the first English Roman Catholic School in Orleans.

The school’s first principal was Gerard Leclair. During its first year of operation, it was known as Queenswood Catholic School and was housed in portables on the property of Reine-des-Bois French Catholic School on Duford Road at Amiens Street. At the time, both schools were part of the Carleton Roman Catholic School Board which had been formed in 1969.

In September 1973, construction of a permanent school building costing $640,000 and situated at 1565 St. Georges Street in Queenswood Heights was completed and the school adopted the Our Lady of Wisdom name. The official opening/naming ceremony for the new school was held on May 26, 1974.

The school originally had a student population spanning from Junior Kindergarten to Grade Eight. As the area's population and student enrollment grew, Lester B. Pearson Catholic High School absorbed the two higher grades while Our Lady of Wisdom had its curriculum reduced to end at Grade Six.

Our Lady of Wisdom School was built as an open-concept school. Only the kindergarten students had a separate room. Initially no walls separated the Grades 1 through 8 classrooms, which surrounded a central library. It was chaotic and students had to learn to listen only to their classroom teacher and not pay attention to what was happening next to them. The open concept formula quickly proved to be a very ineffective method for operating a school. By the fourth year of operation, semi walls had been built to separate the classes from each other and the library. Very soon thereafter, permanent walls were erected.

Similarly, the school office was situated in an open area in the main hallway near the center point of the school. By 1980 it too had walls erected. In 1996, the school's administrative offices were moved to reclaimed classroom space at the front entrance of the school thus providing much needed administrative space and enhancing security for students.

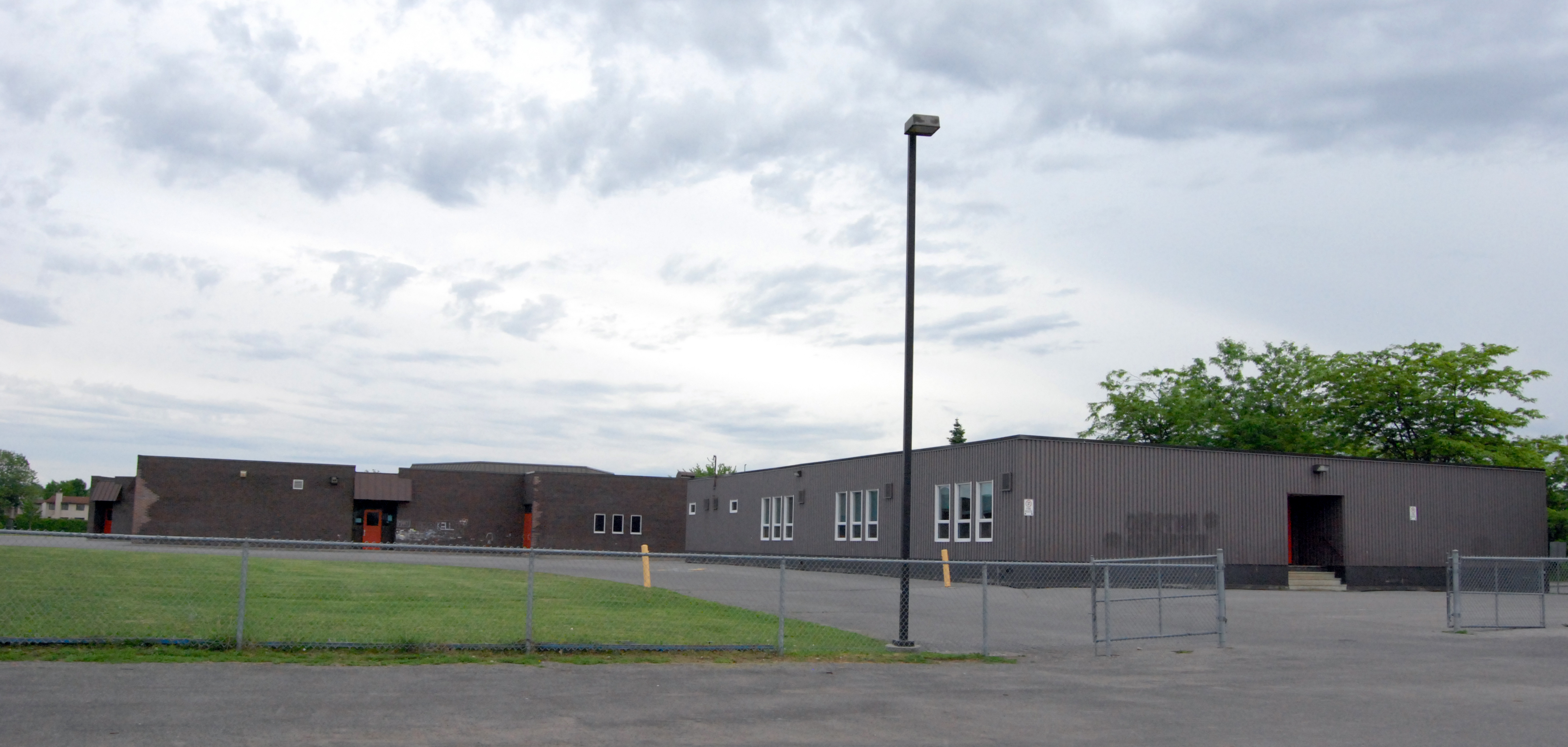
North side of the school showing the port-a-pak that was added in 1984.

The enrollment has fluctuated. The school quickly became over-crowded as Orleans expanded its boundaries. Originally designed to house 432 students, by the mid-1980s the school population was well over 700 students and it was not uncommon to see as many as 8-10 portables on the school grounds during this period. In 1984 an eight-room permanent port-a-pak was added to the school to ease some of the overcrowding and through the 1980s several new schools were built in the area to further relieve some of the school's enrollment pressures. Convent Glen, Divine Infant, Blessed Kateri Tekakwitha and St. Francis of Assisi schools were all opened during this period of tremendous population growth in the region. At one time, Our Lady of Wisdom had 13 portable classrooms on site, with a total school enrolment of nearly 800 students.

From 1973-1983, Our Lady of Wisdom School was associated with St. Joseph Catholic Parish. Since 1983, the newly created Divine Infant Parish assumed the responsibility of caring for the spiritual needs of the school.

During the school’s 25th anniversary celebration in May 1999, Ottawa Archbishop Marcel Gervais provided a school blessing and prayer.

The school logo, which was designed by a grade 6 student, Christine Fournier features a dark “O” circle in which are situated an “L,” a “W” and a cross.

== Song ==
Our Lady of Wisdom Catholic School, "Wisdom" was written in 1982 by grade 6 student Joette Dobra.

"This school is caring
This school is Wisdom
From all the teachers To all the students
From all the classrooms To our library
Wisdom was made for you and me.

As I was working in my classroom
I saw around me my friends and classmates
I saw before me my helpful teacher
Wisdom was made for you and me.

As I was playing in the school yard,
I saw so many happy faces
I saw around me a school of friendship
Wisdom was made for you and me."

== Principals ==
- Gerard Leclair
- Andrew McKinley
- Richard McGrath
- Ralph Watzenboeck
- John Power
- Sheila Fergus
- Pasquale (Pat) Ferraro
- Martine Mitton

=== High school affiliation ===
Students graduating from Grade Six at Our Lady of Wisdom continue their education at St. Peter Catholic High School. Prior to that school's opening in 1992, students graduated to St. Matthew Catholic High School from 1981 to 1991. Prior to 1981, graduates would move on to Lester B. Pearson Catholic High School.

== Notable events ==
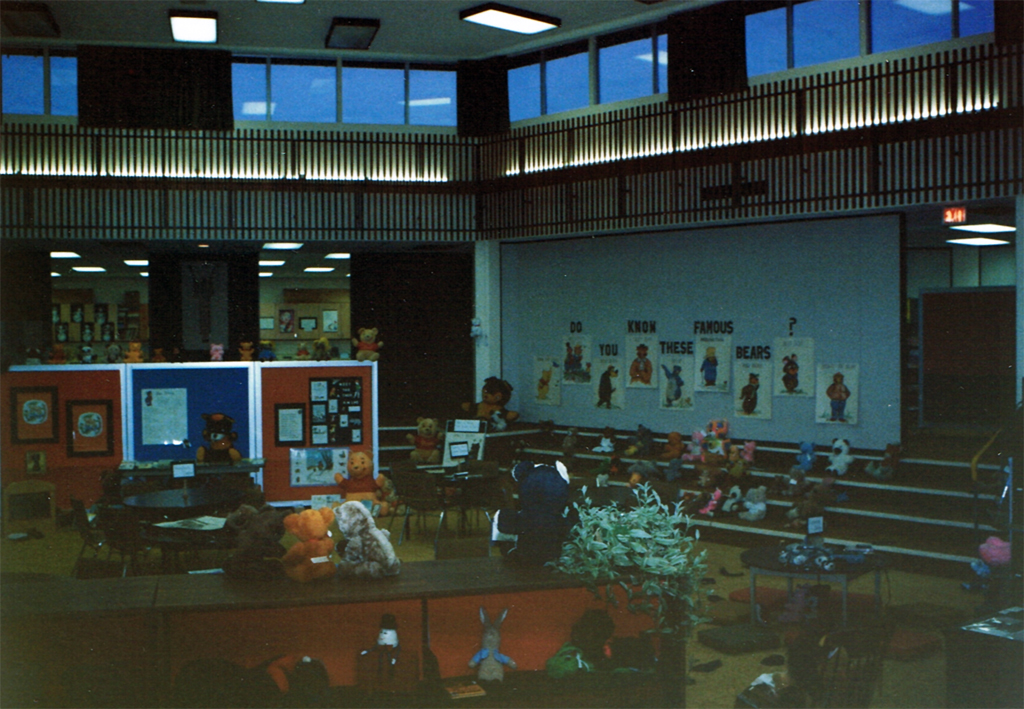
The school library staged for an event circa 1984 to 1986.

=== Visit by former Prime Minister John G. Diefenbaker ===
In April 1976, The Rt. Hon. John G. Diefenbaker, the 13th Prime Minister of Canada (1957–1963), visited Our Lady of Wisdom School. He spoke to the staff and students and signed a copy of the Canadian Bill of Rights (one of his major accomplishments in office) which was framed and placed on a hallway wall. He shared with the children his hopes and dreams for Canada.

=== 25th-anniversary celebration ===
On May 7, 1999, Our Lady of Wisdom School celebrated its 25th year of operation (counted from the official naming ceremony for the school in 1974). The celebrant for the mass was Archbishop Marcel Gervais and Monsignor Leonard Lunney (Pastor, Divine Infant Parish). Speakers at the celebration included John Power (Principal), Brian Coburn (Mayor, Cumberland Township), Ron Larkin (Chairperson, Ottawa Carleton Catholic School Board), Philip Rocco (Director, Ottawa Carleton Catholic School Board) and Angela DiGiacomo (Chairperson, Our Lady of Wisdom School Council).

=== Citizenship Court ===
In 1996, Citizenship Court Judge Suzanne Pinel, held the swearing in of new Canadians at Our Lady of Wisdom School. Students were given an insight into the workings of the Citizenship Court.

== Church affiliation ==
Our Lady of Wisdom School is affiliated with the Divine Infant Parish located at 6658 Bilberry Drive, Orleans, Ontario.
