= Bob Monette =

Canadian politician

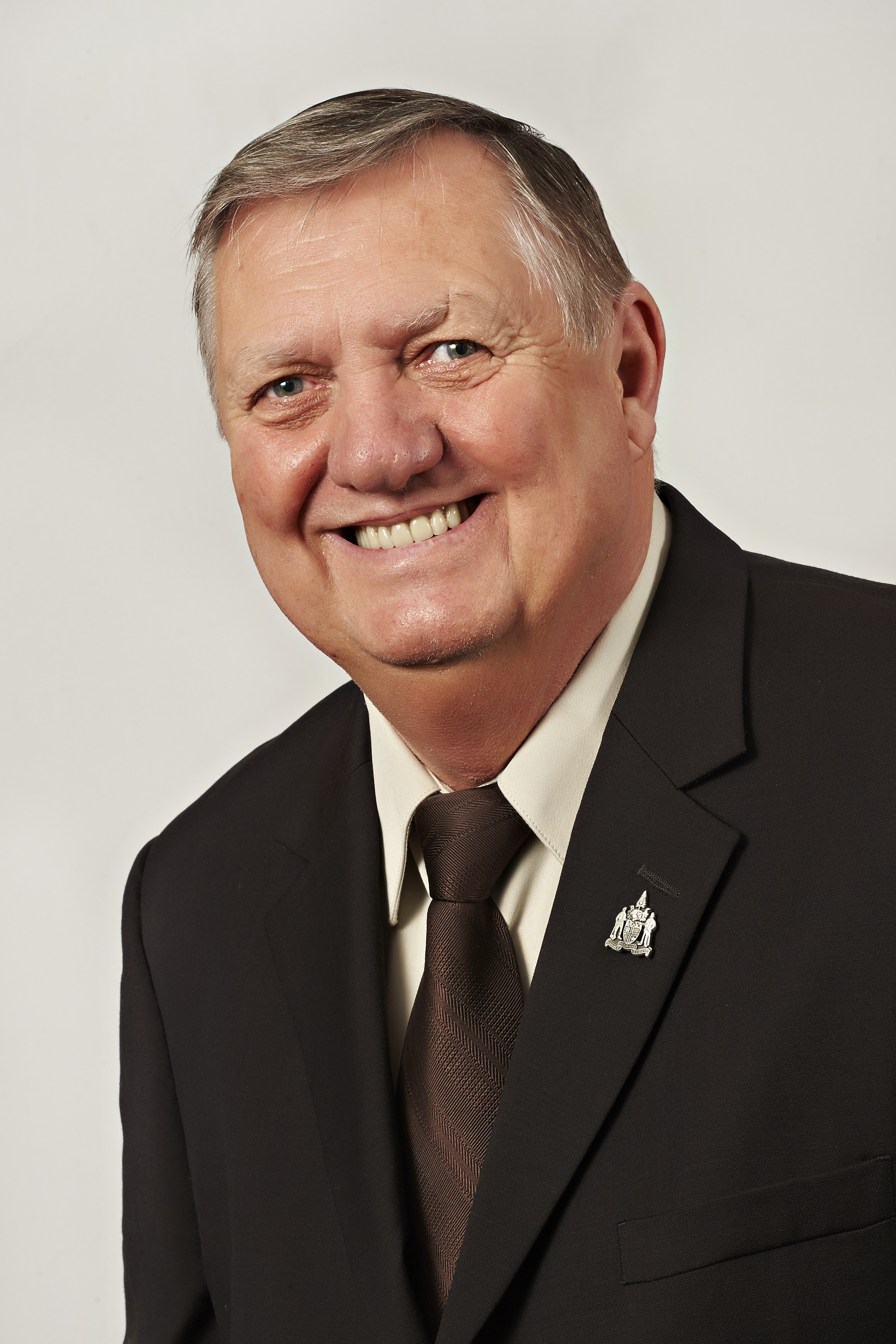

Deputy Mayor of Ottawa Serving with Mark Taylor
- In office December, 2014 – December 1, 2018
- Preceded by: Steve Desroches, Eli El-Chantiry
- Succeeded by: George Darouze, Laura Dudas and Matthew Luloff

Ottawa City Councillor
- In office January 2006 – December 1, 2018
- Preceded by: Herb Kreling
- Succeeded by: Matthew Luloff
- Constituency: Orléans Ward

Cumberland Township Councillor
- In office 1985–1991
- Preceded by: Ray Friel, Gerry Lalonde, Paul Macdonnell, Brian Coburn (At-large)
- Succeeded by: Frank Stacey
- Constituency: Heights Ward

Personal details
- Born: February 18, 1952 (age 74)
- Party: Independent
- Profession: Politician

Robert "Bob" Monette (born February 18, 1952) is a politician in Ottawa, Ontario, Canada. He first joined political life in 1985 when he served on the Cumberland City Council for six years. Monette returned to serve on the Ottawa City Council in January 2006 in a by-election and was then reelected in November 2006 and October 2010.

Prior to being elected, Monette served as the constituency office manager to MPP Phil McNeely of the Ontario Liberal Party. He ran for the Liberal Party of Canada nomination for the 1988 Canadian federal election but lost.

Monette currently sits on the Planning Committee, Transportation Committee and the Hydro Ottawa Holdings Board. Monette has also been elected by Council to sit on both the Central Canada Exhibition Association and the Heart of Orléans Business Improvement Association.

Monette has assisted at cleaning up the Ottawa River; helping to secure over 100 million dollars in funding from all the levels of three levels of government after his 2008 tour of the ROPEC facility. Monette is also focused on the development of Lansdowne Park, and actively participated in the Lansdowne Live proposal. Monette also supports Kettle Island as the new location of the Interprovincial Bridge.

Some of Monette's local accomplishments are, opening up a community garden, the first ever Seniors Park in Eastern Ontario, facilitated in the development of Orléans first hotel in 30 years: Quality Inn, worked in paternership with Forum Inc to develop the Town Centre, and ensuring that Orleans is graffiti free.

Monette has been involved in many non-profit groups including, the Cumberland Community Resource Centre; Ottawa Arthritis Society; Queenswood Heights Neighbourhood Watch Association; Queenswood Heights Community Association, Fallingbrook Community Association.

There was much speculation that Monette would run for the Ontario Progressive Conservative Party in the 2011 Ontario general election. However, on March 2, 2011, he announced he would not be running. He switched to the Tories after disagreement with the policies of Premier Dalton McGuinty.

Monette resides in Queenswood Heights with his wife and three children. On June 13, 2018 he announced he would not seek re-election in the 2018 municipal election.

== Controversy ==
During Ottawa's 2008-2009 Bus Strike, Monette threatened legal action against Councillor Clive Doucet for speaking out against the city's bargaining strategy.

In March 2009, Monette attempted to block atheist slogans from being advertised on OC Transpo buses in an Ottawa City Council motion, despite a legal opinion that such censorship would probably fail in a court challenge.

Bob Monette is firmly in favour of the Corridor 5 (Kettle Island) option for an interprovincial bridge between Ottawa and Gatineau. According to a report released by the consultants engaged to explore bridge options (www.ncrcrossings.ca), a bridge at Kettle Island would result in severe congestion at key intersections along Aviation Parkway for East-West traffic between Ottawa and Orleans.

== Election results ==
=== Cumberland municipal election, 1985 ===
Heritage Ward (2 elected)
Candidate	Votes	%
Bob Monette	1372	34.84
Fern Casey	1012	25.70
Doris Douma	995	25.27
Sandra Graham	559	14.20

=== Cumberland municipal election, 1988 ===
Heritage Ward (2 elected)
Candidate	Votes	%
Bob Monette	3169	40.02
Frank Stacey	2762	34.88
Sidney Marinoff	1102	13.92
Michael Blackburn	855	11.18

=== Cumberland mayoral election, 1991 ===
Candidate	Vote	%
Brian Coburn	7933	64.83
Bob Monette	4304	35.17

=== 1994 Ottawa-Carleton Regional Municipality elections ===
Orléans Ward
Candidate	Votes	%
Herb Kreling	3275	30.37
Bob Monette	3252	30.16
Keith De Cruz	3118	28.92
Bernard Pelot	766	7.10
Stan Lamothe	371	3.44

=== Orleans by-election, 2006 ===
Orléans Ward (Ward 1)
Candidate	Votes	%
Bob Monette	2891	34.15
Sheryl MacDonald	2026	23.93
Elena Harder	1738	20.53
Louise Malloy	578	6.83
Debbie Jodoin	457	5.40
Pierre Maheu	409	4.83
Gino L. Nicolini	307	3.63
Michel Tardif	60	0.71

=== Ottawa municipal election, 2006 ===
Orléans Ward (Ward 1)
Candidate	Votes	%
Bob Monette	12201	69.98
Dennis Vowles	5235	30.02

=== 2010 Ottawa municipal election ===
Orléans Ward (Ward 1)
Candidate	Votes	%
Bob Monette	9728	59.99
Fred Sherwin	3939	24.35
Jennifer Robitaille	2326	14.34
Renee Greenberg	212	1.31

=== 2014 Ottawa municipal election ===
Orléans Ward
Candidate	Vote	%
Bob Monette	10662	75.47
Jennifer Robitaille	2546	18.02
R. Gordon Jensen	919	6.51
