= Matthew Luloff =

Canadian politician (born c. 1984)

Deputy Mayor of Ottawa
- In office December 2018 – December 9, 2020; Serving with Laura Dudas, George Darouze
- Preceded by: Bob Monette; Mark Taylor
- Succeeded by: Jenna Sudds

Ottawa City Councillor
- Incumbent
- Assumed office December 1, 2018
- Preceded by: Bob Monette
- Constituency: Orléans East-Cumberland Ward (from 2022); Orléans Ward (until 2022)

Personal details
- Born: Ottawa, Ontario, Canada
- Party: Conservative (federal); Liberal (federal; until 2023); Independent (municipal)
- Education: Carleton University
- Profession: Politician, soldier, political aide, musician
- Awards: General Campaign Star; Sacrifice Medal
- Website: matthewluloff.ca

Military service
- Allegiance: Canada
- Branch/service: Canadian Army
- Years of service: 2003-2009
- Rank: Corporal
- Unit: Princess Patricia’s Canadian Light Infantry; Governor General's Foot Guards
- Battles/wars: War in Afghanistan

Matthew J. Luloff (born c. 1984) is a Canadian politician who is the Ottawa City Councillor for Orléans East-Cumberland Ward, a suburb of Ottawa, Ontario, Canada. He is a Canadian Forces veteran and served in Afghanistan.

== Military service ==
In 2003 he joined the Governor General's Foot Guards army reserve unit, participating in the Changing the Guard Ceremony on Parliament Hill for four summers and military exercises on the weekends.

Luloff then transferred to the regular force and moved to Manitoba in 2006 to train with the Princess Patricia's Canadian Light Infantry at the base in Shilo. After training as a reconnaissance patrolman, he deployed to Afghanistan in February 2008. Part way through the tour, he was assigned to a rifle platoon and helped to navigate foot patrols. He was stationed in small combat outposts along the Arghandab River, patrolling the volatile Panjwai-Zharey districts of Kandahar Province.

In 2009, Luloff was diagnosed with post-traumatic stress disorder and received a medical release from the Canadian Armed Forces.

== Political career ==
Now a Conservative, Luloff is a former member of the Liberal Party of Canada.

=== Federal government ===
Upon leaving the Canadian Armed Forces & completing a degree at the Arthur Kroeger College of Public Affairs at Carleton University in Ottawa, Luloff transitioned to a different form of public service, working for several members of Parliament, including John McKay and Judy Foote.

Following Justin Trudeau's Liberal Party election victory in 2015, Luloff began a role as Issues Manager in the office of Harjit Sajjan, Minister of National Defence.

=== Municipal councillor ===
In October 2018, Luloff ran in a field of 17 candidates vying for the role of City Councillor for Orleans Ward, winning by a margin of almost 300 votes.

Because of his history with music, one of Luloff's first priorities was to expand the City of Ottawa's Public Library music instrument lending program, which he was successful with in November 2019. The program was expanded to include four local branches thanks to donations from Sun Life Financial.

In addition to being named Deputy Mayor by Mayor Jim Watson, Luloff was also appointed the Council Liaison for Veteran and Military Issues. In this capacity, he launched the Veterans Task Force, a network of partners working to inspire social responsibility, proactive collaboration and support for veterans and their families.

In 2020, Luloff was chosen by council to become the city's newest Chair of the Public Library Board. In this role, he set to work to abolish overdue penalties for book lending, joining only a handful of other public library systems to go fine-free. Explaining why this move was important, Luloff said: "We can talk as a board all we want about addressing racial and income inequality, or we can actually address racial and income inequality." Luloff led the board in 2022 in establishing a new intellectual freedom policy for the Ottawa Public Library, one of the most liberal and permissive in North America.

Luloff was chosen by council in December 2020 to replace Jenna Sudds as Chair of Community and Protective Services Committee.

Luloff was easily re-elected in the 2022 Ottawa municipal election in the renamed Orléans East-Cumberland Ward.

In 2023, Luloff raised constituent concerns that the construction of 81 affordable housing units in his ward would adversely affect parking. The project was approved after a week and a half delay.

=== Federal politics ===
Luloff was going to be the Conservative Party of Canada candidate in the 2025 Canadian federal election in Orléans. However, on July 10, 2024 he withdrew as a candidate. It was later revealed that he had been charged with impaired driving.

== Personal life ==
Luloff grew up in Orléans, graduated from St. Matthew High School, and spent his summers and weekends working as a lifeguard and instructor at a variety of pools including the Bob MacQuarrie and Ray Friel recreation complexes. Following his service, Matthew attended the Arthur Kroeger College of Public Affairs at Carleton University in Ottawa.

He lives in Orléans with his wife Laura and their two daughters.

=== Impaired driving charges ===
In July 2024, Luloff was charged with impaired driving. Ottawa Police arrested him on July 6, 2024, and he faced two counts: operating a motor vehicle while impaired and having a blood alcohol concentration above the legal limit within two hours of driving. Following his arrest, Luloff resigned his nomination as the Conservative Party of Canada candidate for the federal riding of Orléans, citing a “personal matter.”

Luloff pleaded not guilty to the impaired driving charges in provincial court. At the trial, which began in early 2026, the Crown presented witness testimony about allegedly erratic driving and evidence including a video of Luloff’s breath test showing readings above twice the legal limit, which was played in court. Defence counsel raised several Charter of Rights challenges regarding the admissibility of evidence, including arguments about police conduct and procedural issues.

In March 2026, he was found guilty of the impaired driving charges. He was fined $3,500, plus a 30 per cent victim surcharge, and was banned from driving for one year.

=== Music and podcast ===
In addition to public service, Luloff is a musician. Starting at age 14, he has been involved in the local music scene in various bands and ensembles. He fronted the alternative rock group Hearts&Mines, a manifestation of both his passion for rock and roll plus the traumas suffered while serving overseas.

Luloff also produces music on his own, ranging from electronic dance music through his Still Cities project, to acoustic self-titled solo albums.

Additionally, Luloff hosts a regular podcast entitled Veteran X, a podcast about the scars of real battles. "What we start to see is a common thread that a lot of people are feeling the exact same way so basically what Veteran X tells you is you're not alone."

== Electoral record ==
2022 Ottawa municipal election: Orléans East—Cumberland Ward
Candidate	Popular vote			Expenditures
Candidate	Votes	%	±%	Expenditures
Matthew Luloff (X)	11,919	74.17	+50.41	$38,095.39
Rosemee Cantave	2,376	14.79	—	$3,040.70
Tessa Franklin	1,775	11.05	—	$5,869.92
Total valid votes	16,070	97.82		
Total rejected, unmarked and declined votes	358	2.18		
Turnout	16,428	42.54	-0.60	
Eligible voters	38,618			
Note: Candidate campaign colours are based on the prominent colour used in campaign items (signs, literature, etc.) and are used as a visual differentiation between candidates.
Sources: City of Ottawa

2018 Ottawa municipal election: Orléans Ward

Council candidate	Vote	%
Matthew Luloff	3,622	23.76
Catherine Kitts	3,358	22.02
Rick Bédard	2,799	18.36
Mireille Brownhill	1,900	12.46
Kevin Tetreault	685	4.49
Diego Elizondo	399	2.62
Qamar Masood	393	2.58
Jarrod Goldsmith	357	2.34
Dina Epale	336	2.20
Shannon Kramer	333	2.18
Guy Desroches	328	2.15
Miranda Gray	238	1.56
Don Yetman	212	1.39
Doug Feltmate	102	0.67
Toby Bossert	73	0.48
Geoffrey Nicholas Griplas	65	0.43
Louise Soyez	47	0.31
