= Jody Mitic =

Canadian politician (born 1977)

Jody Mitic CD

Ottawa City Councillor
- In office December 1, 2014 – December 1, 2018
- Preceded by: Rainer Bloess
- Succeeded by: Laura Dudas
- Constituency: Innes Ward

Personal details
- Born: January 3, 1977 (age 49) Kitchener, Ontario

Military service
- Allegiance: Canada
- Branch/service: Canadian Army
- Rank: Master Corporal
- Unit: The Royal Canadian Regiment
- Battles/wars: War in Afghanistan

MCpl (ret.) Jody Mitic (/ˈmɪtək/) CD (born January 3, 1977) is a Canadian politician and retired soldier. He served as an Ottawa City Councillor, representing Innes Ward in Ottawa's east end, from 2014 until 2018.

== Background ==
Mitic was born in Kitchener, Ontario. He moved with his family to Winnipeg when he was five where his father worked for the Canadian Auto Workers union. The family later moved to Brampton, Ontario.

While still in high school Mitic joined his local reserve regiment the Lorne Scots. After graduating Mitic worked for a year at an auto parts factory before joining The Royal Canadian Regiment of the regular Canadian Army.

Mitic did a tour of duty in Bosnia and was on his second tour in Afghanistan as a sniper when he lost both of his legs in a landmine incident in 2007.

During his recovery, Mitic worked through some of his psychological issues with a computer program named Ellie, which tracks facial expressions and speech patterns to diagnose post-traumatic stress disorder and depression.

As part of his physical rehabilitation, Mitic successfully recovered and ran in an Achilles Canada 5-km run with prosthetic legs.

Mitic says he became addicted to pain killers after his treatment but eventually managed to quit.

In 2013, he and his brother Cory competed on The Amazing Race Canada 1, finishing in 2nd place. Following his appearance on The Amazing Race Canada, Mitic became a motivational speaker and an advocate for wounded veterans and people with disabilities. In 2016, he appeared on the Trailer Park Boys podcast episode 15 to talk about his book, Unflinching: The Making of a Canadian Sniper.

== Politics ==
Mitic was elected following the departure of long-time city councillor Rainer Bloess. He won with close to one third of the vote, about 1,800 votes ahead of his nearest competitor, Laura Dudas.

During the 2017 Conservative Party leadership contest, Mitic contributed to former Minister of Veterans Affairs Erin O'Toole's campaign.

Mitic announced on March 31, 2018, that he would not be running for re-election, citing wanting to spend more time with his family, and both mental and physical health issues. After months of absenteeism, Ottawa City Council voted June 13, 2018 to authorize an indefinite leave of absence for him, as the body had done in 2013 to facilitate Councillor Stephen Blais' recovery from a heart attack.

On August 19, 2026, Mitic announced his candidacy for Cornwall City Council in Cornwall, Ontario for the 2026 municipal elections. His campaign focused on limiting tax increases and implementing term limits for elected office. Mitic was not elected, ultimately finishing 16th of 26 with 2,167 votes.

After the election, in response to the unofficial results mistakenly displaying that incumbent Mayor Justin Towndale had received 2,141 votes instead of his true total of 4,559, Mitic took to social media with concerns about the City's election process, stating "I question the entire election results of October 26, 2026 in Cornwall. I believe there is shenanigans afoot."

== Personal life ==
He is separated from his former wife, Alannah Gilmore. He has two daughters with his ex-wife. Gilmore had been one of the medics who treated him after his injury in Afghanistan. Mitic wrote a book about his experience in Afghanistan in a memoir titled Unflinching: The Making of a Canadian Sniper.

Mitic later moved to Cornwall, Ontario with his business, Green Army Coffee. He plans on opening a coffee shop with his new partner. He ran unsuccessfully in the 2026 municipal elections for a seat on Cornwall City Council.

== Election results ==
2014 Ottawa municipal election
Innes Ward
Candidate	Votes	%
Jody Mitic	4,294	33.01%
Laura Dudas	2,535	19.49%
François Trépanier	2,117	16.27%
Fred Sherwin	1,974	15.18%
Chantal Lecours	626	4.81%
Eldon Holder	544	4.18%
Teresa Whitmore	466	3.58%
Chris Fraser	385	2.96%
Andrew Modray	67	0.52%

2026 Cornwall municipal election
At-large 8 elected
Candidate	Votes	%
Todd Lalonde	7,213	9.33%
John Cameron	6,142	7.94%
Dean Hollingsworth	5,639	7.29%
Todd Bennett	5,299	6.85%
Jason Riley	4,706	6.09%
Denis Sabourin	4,601	5.95%
Elaine MacDonald	4,344	5.62%
Joël Côté	4,140	5.36%
Claude Poirier	3,802	4.92%
Vamini Mohanathas	3,620	4.68%
Fred Ngoundjo	3,579	4.63%
Lisa Olmstead	3,331	4.31%
Joanne Parker	2,823	3.65%
Jeremy Rose	2,422	3.13%
Carol Boileau	2,337	3.02%
Jody Mitic	2,167	2.80%
Mary Jane Proulx	1,610	2.08%
Jason Mousseau	1,554	2.01%
Dan Beaudoin	1,473	1.91%
Christopher Leclair	1,401	1.81%
Tobias Legros	1,244	1.61%
Roger Lamoureux	1,086	1.40%
Chris Crompton	754	0.98%
Shozib Haroon	729	0.94%
Hamid Dannoun	698	0.90%
Tyler Hudon	595	0.77%
