= Herb Kreling =

Canadian politician (born 1955)

Herb Kreling (born July 10, 1955) is a former Ottawa City Councillor representing Orléans Ward. He was first elected as a regional councillor for the Regional Municipality of Ottawa–Carleton in the 1994 election, and was re-elected to that position in 1997. He was elected to city council in the 2000 municipal election and was re-elected in the 2003 Ottawa election. He was the chair of the Ottawa Police Services Board. He is a graduate of the University of Windsor. Kreling applied to become a provincial Justice of the Peace in 2005, and was recommended for the position, resulting in his resignation from City Council in September 2005.

Preceded by Brian Coburn (as mayor of Cumberland); Claudette Cain (as mayor of Gloucester); Richard Cantin (as Gloucester Regional councillor); Fiona Faucher (as Gloucester Regional councillor)	Regional councillor for Orléans Ward; 1994-2000	Succeeded by Region abolished
Preceded by None, ward amalgamated into Ottawa in 2000	City councillor for Orléans Ward; 2000-2005	Succeeded by Bob Monette
