= Orléans West-Innes Ward =

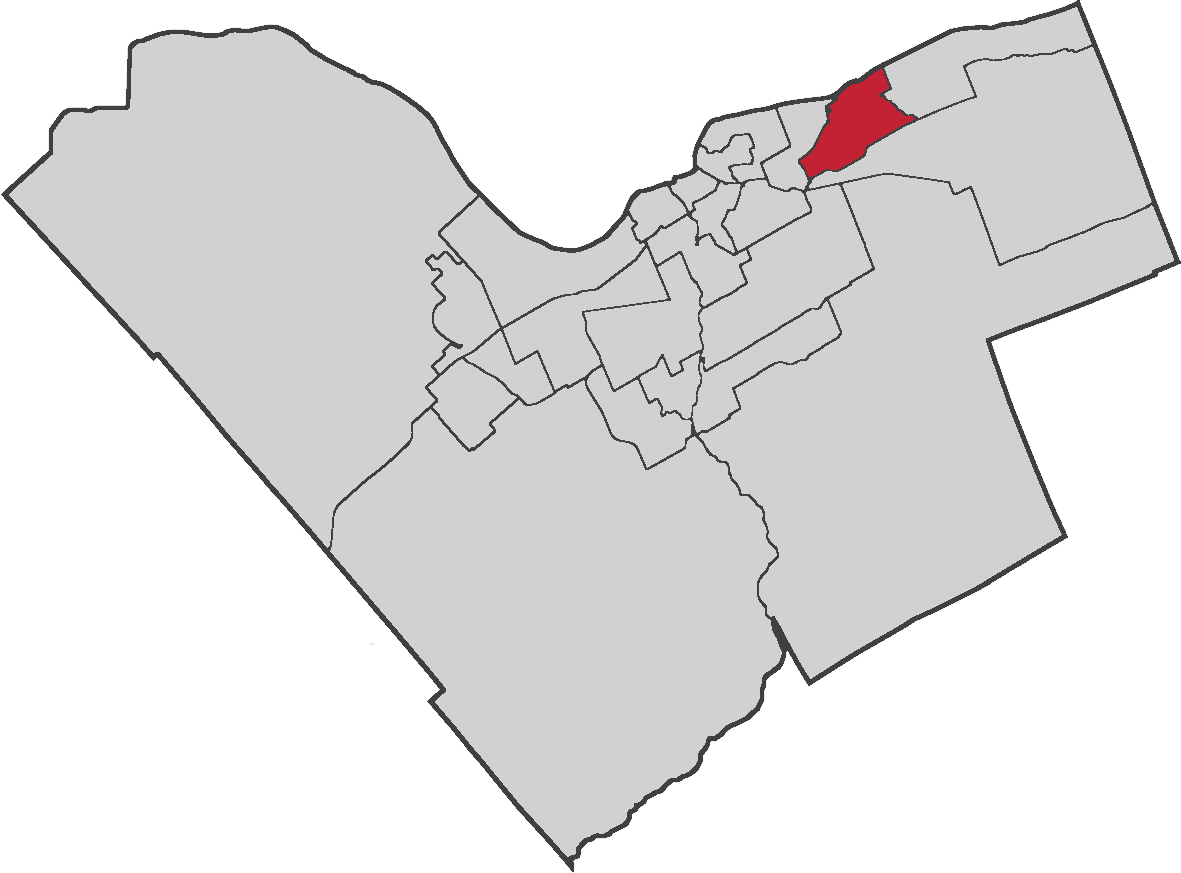
- Location within Ottawa
- Coordinates: 45°26′N 75°34′W
- Country: Canada
- Province: Ontario
- City: Ottawa

Government
  - Councillor: Laura Dudas

Population (2022)
  - Total: 51,713

Languages (2016)
  - English: 53.8%
  - French: 31.8%
  - Arabic: 3.6%
  - Cantonese: 1.1%

Orléans West-Innes Ward (Ward 2) is a city ward in the city of Ottawa, Ontario, Canada. It is located in the eastern end of the city, containing the western half of Orleans subdivision plus the community of Blackburn Hamlet. The ward is represented on Ottawa City Council by Laura Dudas.

Within Orleans, it contains the neighbourhoods of Hiawatha Park, Convent Glen, Orleans Wood, Orléans Village, Chapel Hill and Orleans South.

== History ==
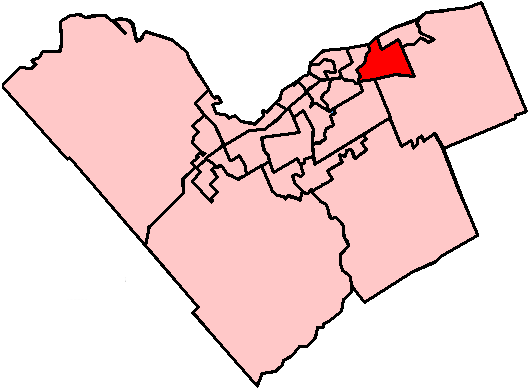
Location of Innes Ward (2006–2022)

From 1994 to 2022, the ward included the community of Blackburn Hamlet as well as the neighbourhoods of Orléans Village, Châteauneuf and Chapel Hill in Orléans. It also included the part of the community of Notre-Dame-des-Champs formerly in the city of Gloucester and the newer Bradley Estates development. The ward was created when the city of Gloucester was amalgamated into the new city of Ottawa. It was named Innes Ward from 1997 to 2022. Prior to that, it was just known as Ward 2.

Following the 2020 Ottawa Ward boundary review, the ward gained the neighbourhood of Convent Glen and lost the neighbourhood of Chapel Hill South.

== Demographics ==
According to the 2011 Canadian census

Ethnic groups: 76.8% White, 5.8% Black, 3.9% Arab, 3.5% South Asian, 2.6% Chinese, 2.1% Aboriginal, 1.3% Filipino, 1.3% West Asian
Languages: 54.8% English, 33.0% French, 2.8% Arabic, 1.8% Chinese
Religions: 72.9% Christian (49.3% Catholic, 5.6% Anglican, 5.1% United Church, 1.7% Christian Orthodox, 1.4% Pentecostal, 1.4% Baptist, 1.0% Presbyterian, 7.4% Other), 5.3% Muslim, 1.2% Hindu, 18.7% No religion
Median income (2010): $45,511
Average income (2010): $54,173

== Regional and city councillors ==
- Prior to 1994, the area was represented by the Mayor of Gloucester and 2 at large Gloucester city and regional councillors. From 1994 to 2000 the area was covered by Blackburn Hamlet and Orléans South Wards on Gloucester City Council.
1. Richard Cantin (1994-2000)
2. Rainer Bloess (2001-2014)
3. Jody Mitic (2014–2018)
4. Laura Dudas (2018–present)

== Election results ==
=== 1994 Ottawa-Carleton Regional Municipality elections ===
Regional council
Candidate	Votes	%
Richard Cantin	4,245	50.18
Ed Campbell	3,800	44.92
Ian A. G. Campbell	414	4.89

=== 1997 Ottawa-Carleton Regional Municipality elections ===
Regional council
Candidate	Votes	%
Richard Cantin	3403	44.41
Ed Campbell	3154	41.16
Joyce Hum	597	7.79
Pierre Maheu	509	6.64

=== 2000 Ottawa municipal election ===
Following Gloucester's amalgamation into Ottawa, Gloucester City Councillor (for Blackburn Hamlet Ward) Rainer Bloess was easily elected.

City council
Candidate	Votes	%
Rainer Bloess	7,006	52.01
Ed Campbell	3,442	25.55
Luc Brisebois	1,572	11.67
Marc Thibault	1,451	10.77

=== 2003 Ottawa municipal election ===
City council
Candidate	Votes	%
Rainer Bloess	5925	59.26
J.-F. Claude	4073	40.74

=== 2006 Ottawa municipal election ===
City council
Candidate	Votes	%
Rainer Bloess	11746	83.65
David Cameron	2296	16.35

=== 2010 Ottawa municipal election ===
City council
Candidate	Votes	%
Rainer Bloess	8497	69.90
Keith Jansa	1515	12.46
Christopher Fraser	1410	11.60
Roger Furmanczyk	734	6.04

=== 2014 Ottawa municipal election ===
City council
Candidate	Vote	%
Jody Mitic	4,294	33.01
Laura Dudas	2,535	19.49
François Trépanier	2,117	16.27
Fred Sherwin	1,974	15.18
Chantal Lecours	626	4.81
Eldon Holder	544	4.18
Teresa Whitmore	466	3.58
Chris Fraser	385	2.96
Andrew Modray	67	0.52

Ottawa mayor (Ward results)
Candidate	Vote	%
Jim Watson	10,279	81.85
Mike Maguire	1,735	13.82
Michael St. Arnaud	141	1.12
Anwar Syed	120	0.96
Rebecca Pyrah	113	0.90
Darren W. Wood	66	0.53
Robert White	58	0.46
Bernard Couchman	46	0.37

=== 2018 Ottawa municipal election ===
Council candidate	Vote	%
Laura Dudas	5,325	41.37
Donna Leith-Gudbranson	3,645	28.32
François Trépanier	2,391	18.58
Tammy Lynch	1,510	11.73

=== 2022 Ottawa municipal election ===
Council candidate	Vote	%
Laura Dudas	11,821	71.43
Lori Stinson	3,309	19.99
Chris Fraser	1,420	8.58

=== 2026 Ottawa municipal election ===
2026 Ottawa municipal election: Orléans West-Innes
Candidate	Popular vote			Expenditures
Candidate	Votes	%	±%	Expenditures
Laura Dudas (X)	10,573	65.56		
David Purchase	3,151	19.45		
Jenna Jessop	2,403	14.90		
Total valid votes	16,274			
Total rejected, unmarked and declined votes				
Turnout		40.65		
Eligible voters	40,033			
Note: Candidate campaign colours are based on the prominent colour used in campaign items (signs, literature, etc.) and are used as a visual differentiation between candidates.
