= Rainer Bloess =

Canadian politician

Ottawa City Councillor
- In office January 1, 2001 – December 1, 2014
- Preceded by: City amalgamated
- Succeeded by: Jody Mitic
- Constituency: Innes Ward

Gloucester City Councillor
- In office December 1, 1994 – December 31, 2000
- Preceded by: Edward Campbell
- Succeeded by: City amalgamated
- Constituency: Blackburn Hamlet Ward

Personal details
- Born: c. 1951
- Party: Liberal Party of Canada

Rainer Bloess was a member of Ottawa City Council. He represents Innes Ward (Ward 2), covering some of the city's eastern suburbs. Bloess was originally a member of the city council of Gloucester, being first elected to that council in 1994 on a cost-cutting platform. When Gloucester was merged into Ottawa in 2000 he ran for Ottawa city council and was elected with a majority of the vote, defeating Ed Campbell and two other candidates. He was subsequently re-elected in 2003, 2006, and 2010.

Bloess is a member of the Liberal Party of Canada. In 2009, he lost to David Bertschi for the Liberal nomination in Ottawa—Orléans for the 2011 federal election.

Bloess lives in the suburban community of Blackburn Hamlet.

== 2003-2006 term ==
On the Ottawa council his main issue was widening Innes Road and working to encourage the spread of the booming economy of western Ottawa to the east. He is described as one of the council's fiscal conservatives and was one of three councilors to refuse the controversial 2003 pay-raise city council voted for themselves. He is generally seen as an opponent of mayor Bob Chiarelli. According to the Ottawa Citizen Bloess, along with councilor Jan Harder, are sometimes called the councils "official opposition." He once initiated a controversial motion that would have required that all residents use Ottawa in their postal address, rather than the names of their former communities. He withdrew the motion after the initiative proved unpopular.

In the 2003 Ottawa election he faced a stiff challenge from Jean-Francois Claude who argued that Ottawa East was being ignored by the city and that Bloess had failed to lobby hard enough for official bilingualism. The race was one of the closest for an incumbent councilor in 2003, but Bloess was reelected.

== Light rail extension project ==
Bloess was an opponent of the city's O-Train light-rail extension from downtown Ottawa to Barrhaven. On December 7, 2006, council voted in favor by a margin of 12–11 to pursue the project without the downtown segment. However, Bloess, who was on holiday during the vote, could not vote against the project, which would have derailed it. He mentioned that he was not aware that the vote would have taken place during his absence. When O'Brien modified his position to be against it because of insufficient funding, a new vote was held in which Bloess was present that officially derailed the project on December 14 by a margin of 13–11.

== Cycling ==
Bloess is an avid cyclist and cycles both in town and on holidays. He tends to vote for cycling improvements.

Preceded by None, ward amalgamated into Ottawa in 2000	City councillors from Innes Ward; 2000-present	Succeeded by Incumbent
