= Convent Glen Catholic School =

Location
- 6212 Jeanne D'Arc Blvd., Ottawa, Ontario; Canada; 45.4733°N 75.5475°W

Information
- Founded: 1979
- School board: Ottawa Catholic District School Board
- Staff: 27
- Grades: JK-6
- Enrollment: 300
- Language: English, French
- Feeder schools: St. Matts

Convent Glen Catholic School (CGCS) is a Roman Catholic elementary school in Orleans, Ottawa, Ontario, Canada.

CGCS is one of 64 elementary schools under the Ottawa Catholic School Board. The school provides junior kindergarten to grade six, as well as French immersion and full day kindergarten. The principal is Tracey Jemmeson.

== History ==
CGCS opened in 1976 as a port-a-pak complex with five classrooms, one bathroom and a combined staff and storage room. When student enrolment increased, a second port-a-pak unit was added. The CGCS students were bused to the Our Lady of Wisdom School for gym class and library time.

When the CGCS opened, its staff consisted of ten members: Robert Laplante, Susan Rheaume, Rosina Davis, Colleen Plante, Norma Menard, Georges Lajeunesse, Martine Bealne, Faye Powell, Betty Sharland, and Dan Charbonneau

In September 1979, CGCS opened its new school building. The school also became the first home to the new Divine Infant Parish. Father Michael Hurtubise conducted the first English Catholic mass in the CGCS gym. After two year, the parish moved its functions to St. Matthew High School.

Prior to CGCS' current principal, Shawna Hamilton, there were seven other principals. The first principal was Robert Laplante. Following in chronological order were Joanne LaPlante, Dr. Margaret McGrath, Joan Gravel, Robert Benning, Paul Wubben, and g

== Current status ==
CGCS is now home to more than 300 staff and students, including 27 teachers, principals, custodians, and librarians. The school day starts at 9:15 am and ends at 3:45; there are three recesses, two snack times and a 45-minute lunch. The parent council organizes an optional paid 'hot lunch' for the students every Friday.

== School colours and logo ==
CGCS students wear burgundy and grey uniforms. The schools logo consists of a cross with a "C" and "G" overlaying each other, surrounded by the school's name "Convent Glen Catholic School". CGCS provides boys and girls touch football, basketball, and volleyball tournaments.

== OCSB EQAO testing scores ==
The grade 3 and grade 6 students at CGCS participate in a provincial-wide standardized test every year. Since the 2008/2009 school year, the OCSB students who took part in the Education Quality Accountability Office (EQAO) standardized test scored just below Provincial standing in reading, writing, and mathematical skills.

== 2013/2014 classroom makeup ==
During the 2013/2014 school year, CGCS held two kindergarten classrooms, five primary classrooms, six junior classrooms, a port-a-pak, a fully equipped computer lab and library, a large gymnasium, a resource room, and a primary and junior resource class.

== Clubs, teams, activities and events ==
- Choir (grades 3 - 6)
- Male and Female Board-wide sporting events: basketball, touch football, volleyball, handball, track and field, cross-country running
- Leadership Clubs
- Chess Club
- Drama Production (every other year)
- Peace Keepers (grade 5 students)
- Milk Program (grade 6 students
- Library Club.
