= Laura Dudas =

Canadian journalist and politician

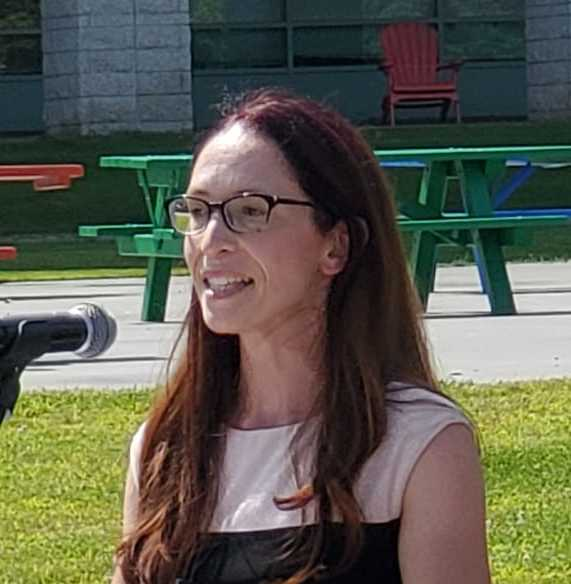
- Dudas in 2022

Ottawa City Councillor
- Incumbent
- Assumed office December 1, 2018
- Preceded by: Jody Mitic
- Constituency: Innes Ward (until 2022); Orléans West-Innes Ward (from 2022)

Deputy Mayor of Ottawa
- In office December, 2018 – December 1, 2022 Serving with Matthew Luloff (until 2020), Jenna Sudds (2020–2021), George Darouze
- Preceded by: Bob Monette, Mark Taylor

Personal details
- Born: Laura Czekaj; November 3, 1978 (age 47) Kitchener, Ontario, Canada
- Spouse: Mike Dudas (m. 2008)
- Children: 3

Laura Lee Dudas (née Czekaj; born November 3, 1978) is a Canadian politician and journalist who was elected to Ottawa City Council in the 2018 Ottawa municipal election representing Innes Ward. She was re-elected in the 2022 Ottawa municipal election in the renamed Orléans West-Innes Ward.

== Early life ==
Dudas was born at St. Mary's General Hospital in Kitchener, Ontario, the daughter of Richard Czekaj, a welder, and Linda Czekaj (nee Murchie), a Sears employee. She has a younger sister named Elizabeth. She grew up in Kitchener.

Dudas married Michael Dudas, a Royal Canadian Mounted Police officer, in 2008 and together they are parents to two children and a stepdaughter. The family moved to Blackburn Hamlet in 2006.

== Education and early career ==
Dudas attended Conestoga College in Kitchener, graduating with a diploma in Journalism. Dudas started her journalism career at the Cambridge Reporter, in Cambridge, before joining the newsroom at the Stratford Beacon Herald, in Stratford, Ontario. In 2002, she became a journalist at the Ottawa Sun, working in the newsroom until 2010.

Following her journalism career, Dudas worked for the City of Ottawa as a Communications Coordinator and Strategist until 2018. Dudas served as the President of the Blackburn Community Association for eight years and was active on the board for 10 years. She chaired the Cancer Chase in 2015, a fundraiser for The Ottawa Hospital Foundation.

Dudas was a member of the former Orléans Chamber of Commerce prior to its amalgamation with the Ottawa Board of Trade. Dudas has been an active supporter of the Heart of Orléans Business Improvement Association and as a City Councillor, sits on the BIA's Board of Directors as a non-voting member.

She is an associate member of the Orléans Branch of the Royal Canadian Legion.

== Political career ==
Dudas first ran for council in the 2014 Ottawa municipal election, coming in second to Jody Mitic. Dudas ran again in 2018, and won 41% of the vote, defeating the second-place candidate by nearly 1,700 votes.

Since 2018, Dudas has served as Deputy Mayor for the City of Ottawa. Additionally, Dudas serves as the Vice-Chair of the Finance and Economic Development Committee, she is a member on the Transportation Committee, the Community and Protective Services Committee, the Planning Committee, and sits on the City's Solid Waste Sponsors Group and Climate Change Sponsors Group. Dudas also acts as Ottawa City Council's liaison with the United Way East Ontario, sitting on their Board of Directors.

In early March 2023, while on the planning committee, she introduced a motion to send a housing proposal to build 81 housing units (30 of which were affordable housing) back to city planners over concerns that the housing would adversely affect parking. This prompted criticisms from affordable housing advocates. After the developer of the housing proposed minor changes, Dudas voted to approve the development plan in late March 2023.

== Electoral record ==
=== 2014 Ottawa municipal election ===
Innes Ward (2)
Council candidate	Vote	%
Jody Mitic	4,294	33.01
Laura Dudas	2,535	19.49
François Trépanier	2,117	16.27
Fred Sherwin	1,974	15.18
Chantal Lecours	626	4.81
Eldon Holder	544	4.18
Teresa Whitmore	466	3.58
Chris Fraser	385	2.96
Andrew Modray	67	0.52

=== 2018 Ottawa Municipal Election ===
Innes Ward (Ward 2)
Candidate	Votes	%
Laura Dudas	5,325	41.37
Donna Leith-Gudbranson	3,645	28.32
François Trépanier	2,391	18.58
Tammy Lynch	1,510	11.73
