= Blackburn Hamlet =

- Community
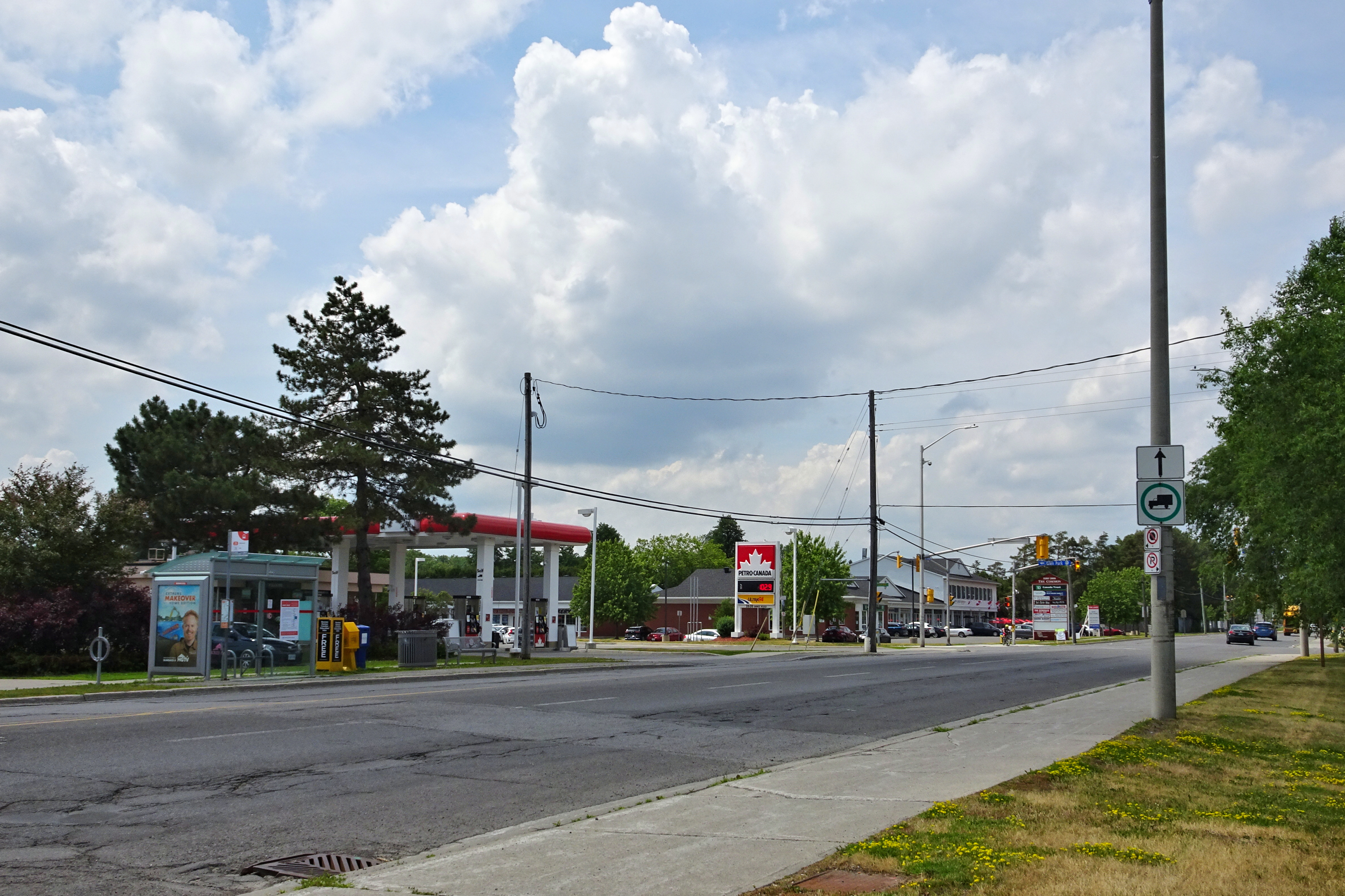
- Innes Road in Blackburn Hamlet

- Blackburn Hamlet within the City of Ottawa
- Coordinates: 45°26′00″N 75°33′50″W
- Country: Canada
- Province: Ontario
- City: Ottawa

Government
  - City Councillor: Laura Dudas
  - MP: Mona Fortier
  - MPP: Stephen Blais

Area
  - Total: 2.41 km^{2} (0.93 sq mi)

Population (2021)
  - Total: 8,173
  - Density: 3,391.29/km^{2} (8,783.4/sq mi)

Blackburn Hamlet is a suburban community in Orléans West-Innes Ward, in the east end of Ottawa, Ontario, Canada. Before the 2001 amalgamation of the city of Ottawa, it was in the city of Gloucester. It is surrounded by rural areas and contains several older and newer areas of settlement. According to the Canada 2021 Census, its population was 8,173. The community took its name from Robert Blackburn, former Member of Parliament for Russell.

Often referred to by the locals as simply "Blackburn" or "The Hamlet," it is one of only two suburban areas (the other being Bells Corners) surrounded by National Capital Commission (NCC) Greenbelt lands as well as lands owned by the Royal Canadian Mounted Police (RCMP) which were formerly the National Defence Proving Grounds. Together, these lands form part of Ottawa's "Greenbelt" and provide Blackburn Hamlet residents and visitors with over 250 km of hiking and cross country skiing trails.

Blackburn is represented at city council, but there is active community volunteer involvement as well through the Blackburn Community Association (BCA). Many activities, clubs, events and committees are run through the BCA.

== History ==
The earliest settlers to the area arrived between 1803 and 1811, most of whom were of English or Irish descent. The area was called "Green's Creek" after Robert Green who operated a sawmill on the creek. By 1834, the timber was exhausted and the government lands had been sold to farmers who began to settle in the area. These people had to clear their own land and build their own roads and schools. In 1850, Richard Dagg donated the land for the first school in Blackburn. The area was subsequently called "Daggsville" after three families that settled there.

John Kemp and his family were one of the early settlers of Blackburn. When the first school burned down in 1915, a second school was built on the Kemp property where Blackburn Public School was located. Agnes Purdy and her husband William settled on Lot 9 across from St Mary the Virgin Anglican Church on Navan Road. Four generations of Purdys farmed the land until the NCC expropriated the farm for the Greenbelt. Agnes was notable as a fundraiser for the church and as a school board secretary for 20 years.

Innes Road running through the Hamlet was named after Alexander Innes who owned a farm further west than Blackburn Hamlet. He also ran the toll road -Russell Rd. heading east from St. Laurent Blvd. He was survived by John Innes who was reeve of Gloucester Township. Isaiah Scharf settled on a lot near Emily Carr School, four generations lived in Blackburn on what is now Innes Road. Some of the hamlet streets are named after them and other early settlers such as Kemp, Cleroux, and Tauvette.

In 1858, Joshua Bradley settled in Blackburn. It was through the efforts of his son William Bradley and Robert Blackburn, (Reeve in 1864, then MP) that a post office was secured in 1876 and it was then that the area became known as "Blackburn". The settlement during these times was divided in two, the area of "Blackburn Corners", located around the existing intersection of Navan and Innes Rds; and "Blackburn Station", the area around the existing intersection of Anderson and Innes Rds.

In 1958, the government gave authority to the NCC to establish a Greenbelt. Landowner Michael Budd and Costain Estates Ltd were key players in the creation and construction of the community as it is today. Most of the homes were built in the 1960s and 1970s and it was renamed "Blackburn Hamlet". In 1967 the first residents moved in. Budd Gardens is operated by Budd's two sons on land now rented from the NCC and both families live in Blackburn.

Bob MacQuarrie was a Gloucester Councillor from 1958 to 1966 and was instrumental in providing to the Council and the NCC the feasibility of installing services to the Hamlet. MacQuarrie served as Deputy Reeve and Reeve 1969 to 1978 and as MPP 1981–85.

== Demographics ==
According to the Canadian census, the population of Blackburn was 8,167 in 2016, a drop of 0.8% from the 2011 population of 8,237. About 17.5% of the population is under the age of 15, while those of retirement age (65 and over) comprise approximately 20.0%. In 2016, females made up about 52.5% of the population while males made up about 47.5%.

Historical census populations – Blackburn Hamlet

Year	Pop.	±%
1956	748	—
1961	1,022	+36.6%
1966	1,481	+44.9%
1971	3,924	+165.0%
1976	6,972	+77.7%

Year	Pop.	±%
1981	9,980	+43.1%
1986	9,674	−3.1%
1991	9,574	−1.0%
1996	9,275	−3.1%
2001	8,955	−3.5%

Year	Pop.	±%
2006	8,527	−4.8%
2011	8,237	−3.4%
2016	8,167	−0.8%
2021	8,173	+0.1%

== Recreational facilities ==
Next to Blackburn is Hornet's Nest, an outdoor recreational facility containing 11 soccer fields. Also in Hornet's Nest is a multi-use, privately owned indoor sports dome called the SuperDome, which houses an additional FIFA-approved soccer pitch. The SuperDome runs throughout the year, allowing summer sports to be played in the winter. École secondaire publique Louis-Riel is home to the Hamlet's second dome, which is also the largest air-supported fabric structure indoor recreation facility in North America at 12,422 square meters (133,705 square feet). The Dome at Louis-Riel, like the SuperDome, also allows for year-round summer sports.

During the winter months, the Blackburn Arena opens its 3 ice rinks, where local residents can partake in hockey and public skating. The Green's Creek toboggan hill, located just next to the hamlet, also opens with the snowfall, and is maintained by the City of Ottawa.

== Government ==
Blackburn Hamlet is represented on the municipal level as part of Innes Ward, with the current city councillor being Laura Dudas. On the provincial level, the Hamlet makes up part of the Orléans provincial electoral district, and is represented by Member of Provincial Parliament Stephen Blais. On the national level, Blackburn is part of the Ottawa-Vanier federal electoral district, with Mona Fortier as Member of Parliament.

On the local level, community initiatives are organized by the Blackburn Community Association (BCA), a group of volunteers. The BCA works to promote local businesses, run community events, and manage the Blackburn Community Hall and other undertakings. Its board of directors includes a president, vice-president, treasurer, and secretary.

== Education ==
=== English Public ===
Elementary

- Glen Ogilvie Public School
- Emily Carr Middle School

High School

- Norman Johnston Alternative School

=== English Catholic ===
Elementary

- Good Shepherd School

=== French Public ===
High School

- École secondaire publique Louis-Riel

=== French Catholic ===
Elementary

- École élémentaire catholique Sainte-Marie

== See also ==
- List of Ottawa neighbourhoods
- Bells Corners
