= Queenswood Heights =

Suburban neighbourhood in Ottawa, Ontario, Canada

Coordinates: 45°28′15″N 75°30′15″W

Queenswood Heights is a neighbourhood located in Orleans, the suburb in the east end of Ottawa, Ontario, Canada. Prior to amalgamation in 2001, the neighbourhood was in the Township of Cumberland. Queenswood Heights is bounded by St. Joseph Boulevard to the north, Tenth Line Road to the east, Innes Road to the south, and the former Cumberland-Gloucester boundary to the west (the Queenswood Heights Community Association considers Duford St. to be the western boundary). According to the Canada 2016 Census, the population of the neighbourhood was 11,031. Queenswood Heights spans 3.71 square kilometres (920 acres).

== Schools ==
There are four elementary level schools serving the needs of young students in the neighbourhood.

- Our Lady of Wisdom Catholic School - English Catholic elementary School
- École élémentaire catholique Reine-des-Bois - Catholic French language elementary school
- Dunning-Foubert Elementary School - English public elementary school
- École élémentaire catholique La Source - Catholic French language elementary school
- Queenswood Public School - closed in June 2008.

== Roads ==
The main roads in this neighbourhood are:

- Des Épinettes Avenue
- Prestwick Drive
- St. Georges Street
- Amiens Street
- Duford Drive
- Tompkins Avenue
- Prestone Drive

== Transit ==
Queenswood Heights is serviced by the following OC Transpo bus routes:

33 35 37 234

== Nature trails ==
Currently there are 5.5 km of trails in Queenswood Heights; these trails include a ravine, foot bridges, benches, etc.
