= Chapel Hill, Ottawa =

Coordinates: 45.4484°N 75.5326°W

Chapel Hill
- Neighbourhood
- Interactive map of Chapel Hill
- Country: Canada
- Province: Ontario
- City: Ottawa

Government
  - Representatives: 1 MP, 1 MPP and 2 City Councillors

Population (2011)
  - Total: 15,917

Chapel Hill is a neighbourhood in the east end Ottawa, Ontario, Canada within the community of Orleans. It is considered an outer-suburb of Ottawa, and before the 2001 amalgamation of the city of Ottawa, it was part of the former City of Gloucester. Chapel Hill consists of mostly single family homes situated next to the National Capital Commission (NCC) Greenbelt and surrounding rural areas. The area is divided into two parts by Innes Road: Chapel Hill North and Chapel Hill South. The northern half is represented by the Chapel Hill North Community Association, while the southern half is represented by the Chapel Hill South Community Association. The boundaries of Chapel Hill North are St. Joseph Blvd (north), Boyer Rd (east), Innes Rd (south) and the greenbelt (west).

According to the 2011 Census, the population of Chapel Hill is 15,917 people, with 7,396 in the south and 8,521 in the north.

== Education ==
=== French Public ===
Elementary

- École élémentaire publique le Prélude

=== French Catholic ===
Elementary

- École élémentaire catholique Notre-Dame-des-Champs

Secondary

- Collège catholique Mer Bleue

=== English Public ===
Elementary

- Forest Valley Elementary School

=== English Catholic ===
Elementary

- Chapel Hill Catholic School

== See also ==
- List of Ottawa neighbourhoods
