= List of north-south arterial roads in Guelph =

This is a follow list of the north–south arterial thoroughfares in the Canadian City Guelph. Some of these date back to the late 1800s. Most of the streets will follow the north–south pattern except for Eramosa Road. This list will order the roads in west–east order.

== Whitelaw Road ==
Whitelaw Road
WHITELAW RD
- Length: 1.5 km (0.93 mi)
- Location: Fife Road-Paisley Road (Continues south into Puslinch)

Whitelaw Road is a road near the border of Guelph (west). Its true south end is near Niska Road and Sideroad 10 N. Its arrival to Guelph is near Wellington Rd 124 (Wellington Street West) after the industrial area. After Fife Road, the street becomes a residential area to Paisley Road, where the road ends.

== Elmira Road ==
Elmira Road
Elmira Rd
- Length: 5.1 km (3.2 mi)
- Location: Fife Road- Woodlawn Road West (Continues north into Guelph/Eramosa as Wellington Road 86)

Elmira Road starts at a dead end near Fife Road. Then it moves diagonally left near Rochelle Dr. Elmira Road rapidly changes into 50 km/h after Paisley Road and continuing to Woodlawn. Once it reaches to Woodlawn Road West, the speed changes into 80 km/h. Elmira Road haven't really ended until Wilbert Street, but some say it is already in Wellington Road 86 already, so it doesn't count. The WR 86 goes to Waterloo Region and changes into Church Street.

== Imperial Road ==
Imperial Road
Imperial Rd
- Length: 5.0 km (3.1 mi)
- Location: Wellington Street West- Curtis Drive

Imperial Road is a secondary road in the city of Guelph. It is close to Hwy 6 (not between Stephanie Drive and Kipling Ave) and mostly commercial. It has places like West End Community Centre, Majestic Collison (near Curtis Drive) and Cineplex Guelph. It is one of the arterial roads in Guelph that doesn't cross the Guelph border.

== Downey Road ==
Downey Road
DOWNEY RD
- Length: 3.6 km (2.2 mi)
- Location: Forestell Road- Hanlon Expressway (Continues south to Puslinch as Wellington Road 35 and east as Kortright Road West)

Downey Road is a road in Guelph that passes through West Puslinch and is 3 km above Imperial Road. Downey Road leads to the YMCA and the future line that connects Stone Road up north for the future interchange of Highway 6.

== Westwood Road ==
Westwood Road
Westwood Rd
- Length: 2.0 km (1.2 mi)
- Location: Silvercreek Parkway North-Bond Crt

Westwood Road is a road that passes through Highway 6 with an overpass. It begins at the major road of Silvercreek Parkway North and continues west until Willow Road, which starts building up north to Imperial Road N. and ends near Bond Crt.

== Hanlon Expressway ==
Hanlon Expressway/ Hanlon Parkway
- Length: 15.4 km (9.6 mi)
- Location: Maltby Road West-Woodlawn Road West (Continues south into Puslinch to Hwy. 401)

Hanlon Expressway or Hanlon Parkway is a soon-to-become freeway in the city of Guelph. It consists Highway 6 (mainly) and Highway 7 at the Wellington Street interchange and beyond. Hanlon Expressway was supposed to go up to College Avenue, but the constructions in 1950s and 1960s brought up to this 15 km high road. It started up into a trumpet interchange in Hwy 401 and arrived at Guelph near Maltby Road. Laird Road was the first interchange to come across Hwy. 6. To see more information, go to the highlighted link above.

== Silvercreek Parkway ==
Silvercreek Parkway
Silvercreek Pkwy
- Length: 4.2 km (2.6 mi)
- Location: Interchange of Wellington Street West- Curtis Drive (Continues east as Waterloo Avenue and north into Guelph/Eramosa as Wellington Road 39)

Silvercreek Parkway is a major road aligned to Hanlon Expressway on the east. The road was split on the south side and the north side. The first part of Silvercreek was near Waterloo Avenue at the interchange of Wellington Street W. It was around 900 m. The second part of Silvercreek was the major portion. At the reach of Curtis Drive, WR 39 continues until WR 51.

== Janefield Avenue ==
Janefield Avenue
Janefield Ave
- Length: 0.85 km (0.53 mi)
- Location: Scottsdale Drive- College Avenue West (Continues north as Centennial Road)

Janefield Avenue is a road nearby the Stone Road Mall at the south end and Centennial at the north.

== Scottsdale Drive ==
Scottsdale Drive
Scottsdale Dr
- Length: 2.3 km (1.4 mi)
- Location: Kortright Road West- College Avenue West (Continues south as Ironwood Rd)

Scottsdale Drive is a road aligned at the Stone Road Mall near Stone Road. It is also a replacement of Silvercreek Parkway South.

== Alma Street ==
Alma Street
Alma St
- Length: 1.7 km (1.1 mi)
- Location: Waterloo Avenue-Willow Road

Alma Street is a road intersecting major roads near the Downtown Area. The street splits at Inkerman Street (near Paisley Road).

== Gordon Street ==
Gordon Street
Gordon St
- Length: 8.95 km (5.56 mi)
- Location: Maltby Road - Waterloo Avenue

Gordon Street is a major north–south road extending from the downtown core to the southern city limits. The road used to be an alignment of Highway 6, but was bypassed due to the construction of the Hanlon Expressway. Gordon Street continues north through downtown as Norfolk Street and then to the northern city limits as Woolwich Street. The street was named by John Galt after Margaret Gordon, who was reportedly the first woman to visit Guelph.
