= Gord Hunter =

Canadian politician (born 1946)

Gordon W. Hunter (born January 20, 1946) was an Ottawa City Councillor. He represented Knoxdale-Merivale Ward. On January 31, 2010, he announced that he would not be running re-election to city council in 2010.

Born in Montreal, Quebec, Canada, Hunter was born into a military family and moved frequently during his childhood. He attended Lakefield College School, Dalhousie University, and University of Toronto, graduating in 1968. He moved to Nepean in 1968 to become a teacher at Confederation High School, and taught physical education there for thirty-one years until the school closed in 1999. He was also a national champion at orienteering.

He ran for the federal Liberal Party in the 1980 federal election, but lost to Progressive Conservative Walter Baker by more than 12,000 votes. He ran again in the 1984 federal election, and lost by almost 21,000 votes. (This was the election where the Progressive Conservatives swept to power with a majority government.)

Hunter entered municipal politics in 1980 when he was elected to the Nepean City Council as well as to the Regional Municipality of Ottawa–Carleton Council. He was easily reelected in every election thereafter: 1982, 1985, 1988, 1991, 1994, 1997.

During the 1980s when the Non-Smoking Bylaw was on the agenda at the Nepean City Hall (non-smoking areas in restaurants) Garfield Mahood, executive director of Non-Smokers' Rights Association, amongst other health experts, attempted to persuade Hunter to support the bylaw. However, Hunter steadfastly refused to support a non-smoking bylaw.

In 1994, as a result of local government reorganization, Hunter moved to the Regional Municipality of Ottawa-Carleton Council. A Liberal, he ran for the party in the 1999 provincial election in the riding of Nepean—Carleton, but lost to Tory incumbent John Baird. He was, however, regarded as one of the more fiscally conservative councillors.

With the creation of the new city of Ottawa, in 2000, Hunter ran to represent the Knoxdale-Merivale ward, and easily won election against an anti-development activist. In the 2003 municipal election, he was re-elected with 84% of the vote.

Hunter was opposed to the city's O-Train light-rail expansion which would have linked Barrhaven South to downtown in 2009, before it was cancelled by City Council on December 14, 2006. Hunter expressed concerns about high costs on the project as well as the ridership. On December 8, 2006, Hunter voted against a plan that would have truncated only the downtown segment of the proposal and later introduced another vote to topple the complete project which failed. On December 14, 2006, after Mayor Larry O'Brien decided to vote against the project, Hunter voted for the cancellation of the project.

Gord Hunter was also criticized for the appearance of a conflict of interest for having accepted a free corporate box seat at the 2007 Stanley Cup NHL hockey playoff game (Senators v.s. Anaheim Ducks) at Scotiabank Place from Waste Management Services—a company that the City does business with. (Ottawa Sun, June 11, 2007). The City of Ottawa Policy states: "employees must not accept, directly or indirectly, any gifts, hospitality or other benefits that are offered by persons, groups or organizations having dealings with the city." However, other than addressing corruption, the provincial Municipal Act does not prohibit councillors from accepting such gifts.

It was revealed in a report of the City of Ottawa's 2007 office budget spending by city councillors that Gord Hunter spent the least. According to the Ottawa Sun (April 1, 2008): "The most frugal on the list is always Knoxdale-Merivale Coun. Gord Hunter and 2007 was no exception. Hunter only spent $11,862 of his budget, saving taxpayers more than $24,000."

== Election results ==
=== Canadian federal election, 1980 ===
Nepean–Carleton

1980 Canadian federal election
| Party | Candidate | Votes | % | ±% |
|---|---|---|---|---|
| Progressive Conservative | Walter Baker | 31,498 | 53.5% | -6.0% |
| Liberal | Gord Hunter | 19,482 | 33.1% | +5.4% |
| New Democratic | Alan White | 7,187 | 12.2% | -0.5% |
| Rhinoceros | Alan Cockerell | 658 | 1.1% | |
| Total valid votes | | 58,825 | 100.0% | |

=== Canadian federal election, 1984 ===
Nepean–Carleton

1984 Canadian federal election
| Party | Candidate | Votes | % | ±% |
|---|---|---|---|---|
| Progressive Conservative | Bill Tupper | 41,663 | 55.9% | +2.4% |
| Liberal | Gord Hunter | 20,852 | 28.0% | -5.1% |
| New Democratic | Bea Murray | 11,035 | 14.8% | +2.6% |
| Green | Gregory Vezina | 737 | 1.0% | |
| Independent | Ray Turmel | 204 | 0.3% | |
| Total valid votes | | 74,491 | 100.0% | |

=== Ottawa-Carleton Regional Municipality elections, 1997 ===
Knoxdale-Merivale Ward
| Candidate | Votes | % |
|---|---|---|
| Gord Hunter | ACCLAIMED | |

=== Ontario provincial election, 1999 ===
1999 Ontario general election: Nepean—Carleton
| Party | Candidate | Votes | % | Expenditures |
|---|---|---|---|---|
| Progressive Conservative | John Baird | 31,546 | 62.31 | $60,150.37 |
| Liberal | Gord Hunter | 16,809 | 33.20 | 56,229.71 |
| New Democratic | Craig Parsons | 1,647 | 3.25 | 8,231.29 |
| Freedom | Bill Frampton | 386 | 0.76 | 0.00 |
| Natural Law | Brian E. Jackson | 239 | 0.47 | 0.00 |
| Total valid votes/expense limit | | 50,627 | 100.0 | $ 80,110.08 |
| Total rejected ballots | | 294 | 0.58 | |
| Turnout | | 50,921 | 61.02 | |
| Eligible voters | | 83,448 | | |
Source(s) "General Election of June 3 1999 — Summary of Valid Ballots by Candidate". Elections Ontario. "General Election of June 3 1999 — Statistical Summary". Elections Ontario. "1999 Election and Annual Returns - Candidate and Constituency Association Returns".

=== Ottawa municipal election, 2000 ===
Knoxdale-Merivale Ward (Ward 9)
| Candidate | Votes | % |
|---|---|---|
| Gord Hunter'' | 7845 | 71.27% |
| Al Speyers | 3163 | 28.73% |

=== Ottawa municipal election, 2003 ===
Knoxdale-Merivale Ward (Ward 9)
| Candidate | Votes | % |
|---|---|---|
| Gord Hunter | 7029 | 84.79% |
| Philip Unhola | 637 | 7.68% |
| Al Speyers | 624 | 7.53% |

=== Ottawa municipal election, 2006 ===
Knoxdale-Merivale Ward (Ward 9)
| Candidate | Votes | % |
|---|---|---|
| Gord Hunter | 10461 | 78.13% |
| James Dean | 2929 | 21.87% |

| Preceded by None, ward amalgamated into Ottawa in 2000 | City councillors from Knoxdale-Merivale Ward; 2001-2010 | Succeeded by Keith Egli |
