= 2022 Ottawa municipal election =

Election in Ontario, Canada

2022 Ottawa mayoral election
- October 24, 2022
- Turnout: 43.79% (▲1.24pp)
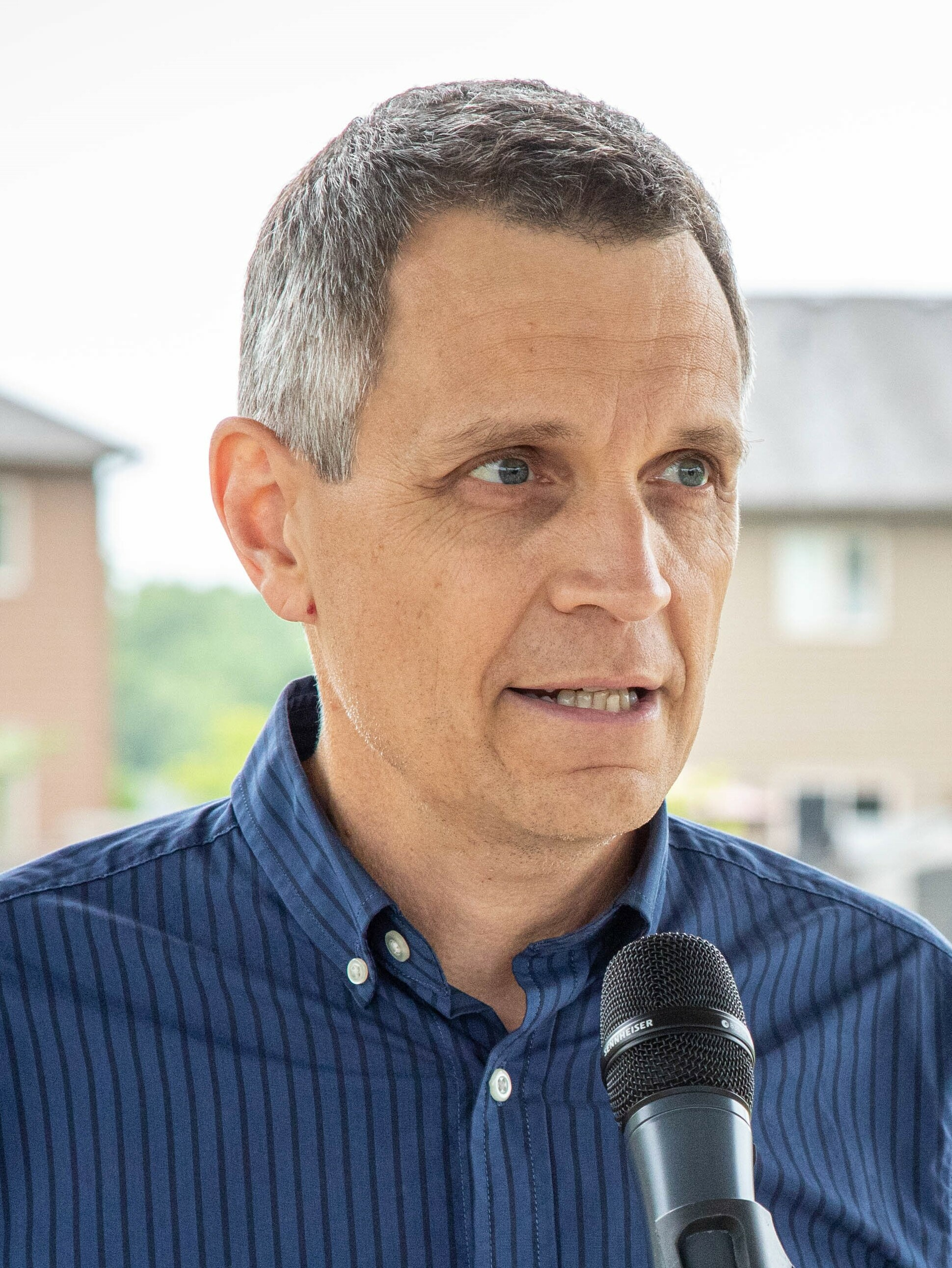

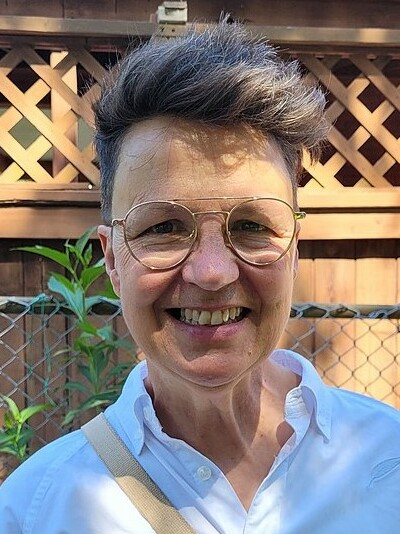

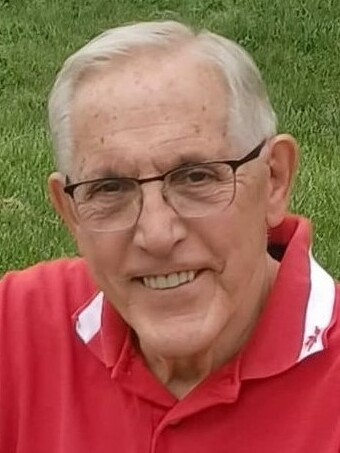
Candidate	Mark Sutcliffe	Catherine McKenney	Bob Chiarelli
Popular vote	161,677	119,235	15,998
Percentage	51.37%	37.88%	5.08%
- Mayoral results by ward
Mayor before election
Jim Watson
Elected mayor
Mark Sutcliffe

The 2022 Ottawa municipal election was held on Monday, October 24, 2022, to elect a mayor, city councillors, and trustees to the English and French public school boards and the English and French Catholic school boards in Ottawa, Ontario, Canada.

Incumbent Mayor Jim Watson did not run for re-election, citing his age as the reason behind his decision. This election was the first since the 1997 municipal election that an incumbent mayor or its equivalent (Note: Bob Chiarelli was the Regional Chair of Ottawa–Carleton prior to the 2000 election.) did not run for re-election. The mayoral election was won by businessman and former journalist Mark Sutcliffe.

Candidate nominations opened on May 2 and closed on August 19. The election was held on the same day as the 2022 Ontario municipal elections.

== Background ==
The outgoing city council was marred by a split between supporters of Mayor Jim Watson, known by detractors as the "Watson club", who represented mostly suburban and rural wards, and opponents of the mayor's agenda, who mostly represent more urban wards. Some of Watson's more vocal critics on council have included Jeff Leiper, Catherine McKenney, Shawn Menard, Carol Anne Meehan and Diane Deans. This divide on council has shown up on a number of key issues during the term, such as a fight over who should chair the transportation committee, the Ottawa Police Services budget, a tax break for a proposed Porsche dealership in Vanier, whether to call for a judicial inquiry into the beleaguered Ottawa light rail system, how to deal with the Freedom Convoy occupation of the downtown core, and a vote on an unpopular addition to the Chateau Laurier.

=== Incumbents not running for re-election ===
Incumbent	Position	Ward/Zone	Date announced	New office holder
Valérie Assoi	Trustee	Zone 6 (CECCE)	N/A (did not file)	Denis Forget
Christine Boothby	Trustee	Zone 2 (OCDSB)	N/A (did not file)	Alysha Aziz
Rob Campbell	Trustee	Zone 5 (OCDSB)	N/A (did not file)	Amanda Presley
Eli El-Chantiry	Councillor	West Carleton-March	July 28, 2022	Clarke Kelly
Denis M. Chartrand	Trustee	Zone 7 (CEPEO)	N/A (did not file)	Philippe Landry
Rick Chiarelli	Councillor	College	August 19, 2022	Laine Johnson
Jean Cloutier	Councillor	Alta Vista	January 27, 2022	Marty Carr
Diane Deans	Councillor	Gloucester-Southgate	December 10, 2021	Jessica Bradley
Chris Ellis	Trustee	Zone 6 (OCDSB)	N/A (did not file)	Lyra Evans
Keith Egli	Councillor	Knoxdale-Merivale	April 20, 2022	Sean Devine
Mark Fisher	Trustee	Zone 11 (OCDSB)	N/A (did not file)	Matthew Lee
Mathieu Fleury	Councillor	Rideau-Vanier	May 10, 2022	Stéphanie Plante
Jan Harder	Councillor	Barrhaven	December 3, 2018	David Hill
Wendy Hough	Trustee	Zone 4 (OCDSB)	N/A (did not file)	Suzanne Nash
Catherine McKenney	Councillor	Somerset	December 10, 2021	Ariel Troster
Carol Anne Meehan	Councillor	Gloucester-South Nepean	July 25, 2022	Steve Desroches
Scott Moffatt	Councillor	Rideau-Goulbourn	November 14, 2021	David Brown
Roda Muse	Trustee	Zone 6 (CEPEO)	N/A (did not file)	Marc Roy
Keith Penny	Trustee	Zone 8 (OCDSB)	N/A (did not file)	Donna Dickson
Sandra Schwartz	Trustee	Zone 12 (OCDSB)	N/A (did not file)	Cathryne Milburn
Jim Watson	Mayor	Ottawa	December 10, 2021	Mark Sutcliffe

== Mayoral candidates ==
=== Registered candidates ===
==== Brandon Bay ====
Campaign logo

Brandon Bay, 34, is a software developer.

Candidacy registered: May 2, 2022
Campaign website: www.brandonbay.ca
Campaign slogan: Working Together.
Campaign slogan (French): Travaillons ensemble.
Policies: Build smart, affordable housing, invest in businesses and the future, market Ottawa to itself and the world

==== Zed Chebib ====
Zed Chebib, 67 is a Lebanese-born Canadian limousine driver and police reform advocate who is most known for being deported from Australia despite having resided in the country with his family for over a decade.

Candidacy registered: August 10, 2022

==== Bob Chiarelli ====
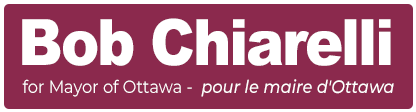
Campaign logo

Bob Chiarelli, 81, is the former Mayor (2001–2006) and Regional Chair (1997–2001), a former provincial cabinet minister under Dalton McGuinty and Kathleen Wynne, and the former MPP for Ottawa West—Nepean (2010–2018) and Ottawa West (1987–1997). He is the second cousin of outgoing city councillor for College Ward Rick Chiarelli.

Candidacy announced: December 10, 2021
Candidacy registered: May 2, 2022
Campaign website: bobchiarelli.ca
Campaign slogan: Moving Ottawa Forward
Campaign slogan (French): Faire progresser la ville d'Ottawa
Policies: Repairing a 'fractured, toxic city council'; "instilling leadership" through hearing and responding to the needs of its citizens, getting the right people in the same room at the same time, assisting councillors in reaching their constituents’ goals, respecting all councillors regardless of their views, working in partnership with councillors, special interest groups; Getting value for tax dollars.

==== Bernard Couchman ====
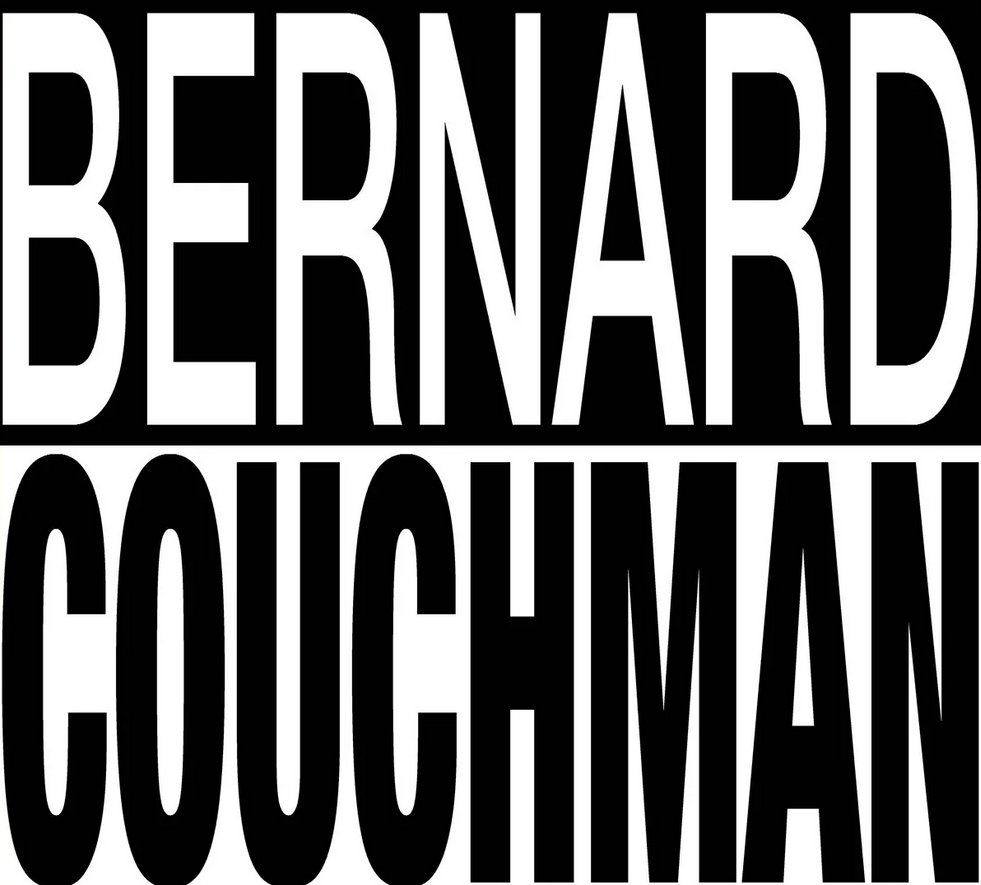
Campaign logo

Bernard Couchman, 43, is a businessman and perennial candidate. He ran for mayor in the 2014 and 2018 elections.

Candidacy registered: May 2, 2022
Campaign website: www.bernardcouchman.ca
Campaign slogan: It's about you and I.
Campaign slogan (French): Il s'agit de toi et de moi.

==== Celine Debassige ====
Celine Debassige, 22, is an Indigenous activist and poet. She is Ojibwe and Dene, and described herself as a "radical socialist".

Candidacy registered: July 15, 2022

==== Gregory "Jreg" Guevara ====
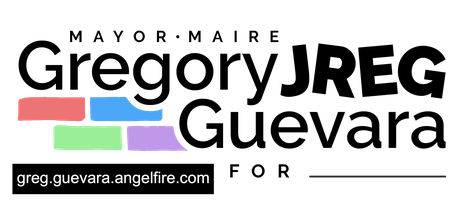
Campaign logo

Gregory "Jreg" Guevara, 25, is a YouTuber and journalist who goes under the pseudonym Jreg (also JrEg) online. He writes for Capital Current, and formerly for The Charlatan and Apartment613. Guevara denied that his campaign is a joke, instead referring to it as post ironic. He stated that he is simultaneously a libertarian and a socialist, and describes his political beliefs as anti-centrist.

Candidacy registered: July 22, 2022
Candidacy announced: August 9, 2022
Campaign website: greg.guevara.angelfire.com
Campaign slogan: OttaWall for all!!!

==== Nour Kadri ====
Nour Kadri, 48, is a professor and an expert-on-call at the University of Ottawa, president & CEO of Skyline Health Systems, and president of the Canadian Arab Federation.

Candidacy registered: August 2, 2022
Campaign website: kadri.ca
Campaign slogan: Leadership that Works for You
Campaign slogan (French): Un leadership à votre service

==== Graham MacDonald ====
Campaign logo

Graham Macdonald, 39, is a businessman and the founder & former CEO of Ottawa Mortuary Services. He previously served as the president of the Ottawa District Funeral Service Association.

Candidacy registered: May 3, 2022
Campaign website: www.macdonald4mayor.com
Campaign slogan: Accountability

==== Mike Maguire ====
Campaign logo

Mike Maguire, 61, is an independent management consultant and a former public servant. He was the mayoral runner-up in the 2014 and a candidate in 2010. He considers himself to on the right wing of the political spectrum.

Candidacy registered: June 29, 2022
Campaign website: mikeforottawa.ca
Campaign slogan: Responsibility, Integrity, Leadership
Campaign slogan (French): Responsabilité, Intégrité, Leadership

==== Catherine McKenney ====
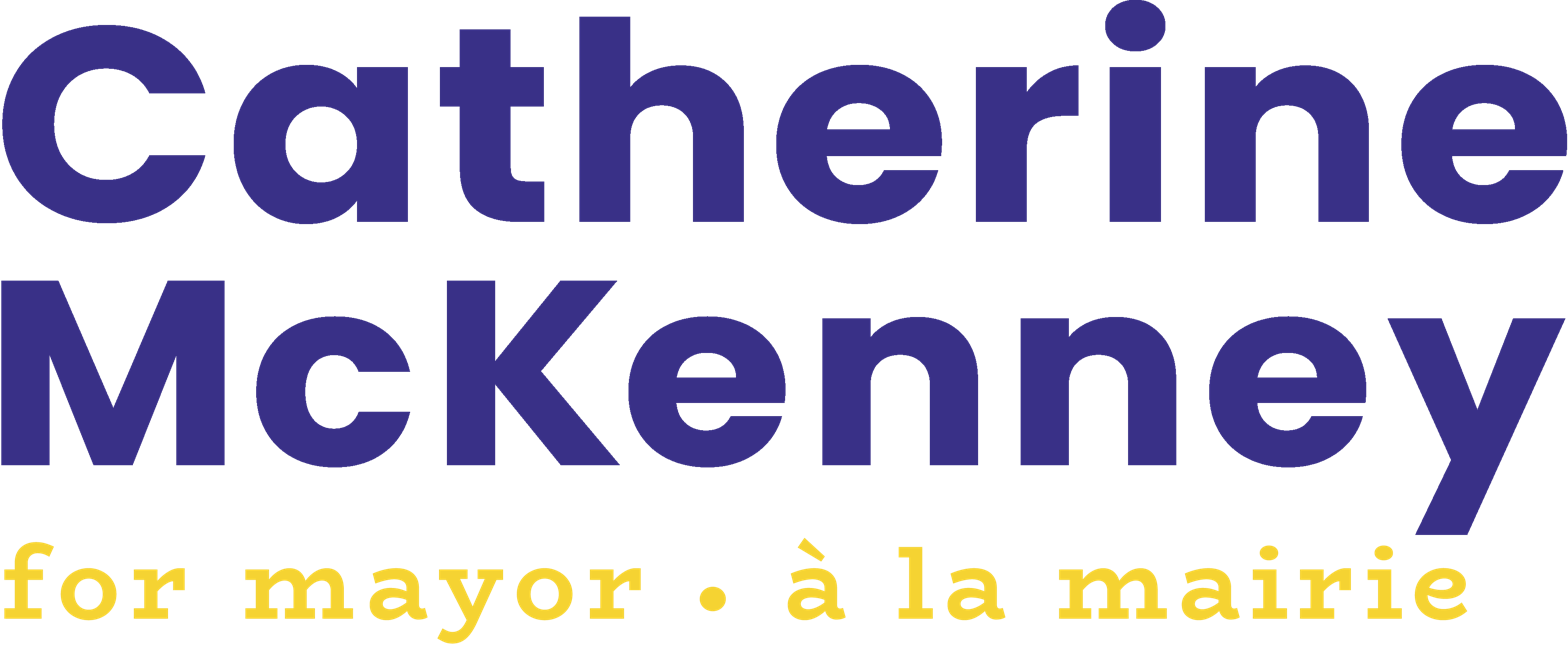
Campaign logo

Catherine McKenney, 61, is the city councillor for Somerset Ward since 2014. Prior to being elected to city council, McKenney was a political staffer to councillors Alex Munter and Diane Holmes, and MPs Ed Broadbent and Paul Dewar.

Candidacy announced: December 10, 2021
Candidacy registered: May 3, 2022
Campaign website: www.mckenney2022.ca
Campaign slogan: Let's build a city that works for all of us
Campaign slogan (French): Bâtissons une ville inclusive!
Policies: More trees and greenspace, putting climate action at the centre of all the City's decisions, reinvesting in social services and supports for Ottawa's most vulnerable, investing in active transportation and recreation, make bussing and the LRT easier and more convenient, make transit as affordable as possible to reduce congestion, restore trust, transparency and accountability at city hall, grow arts, entertainment and culture sector.

==== Ade Olumide ====
Campaign logo

Ade Olumide, 51, is a taxpayer rights advocate and former president of the Municipal Taxpayer Advocacy Group. He sought the Conservative Party of Canada nomination for Kanata—Carleton for the 2015 Canadian federal election, but was disqualified with no reason provided. Olumide later challenged the decision in court, citing his ethnic origin as the reason for his disqualification.

Candidacy registered: May 10, 2022
Campaign website: www.adeolumide.ca
Campaign slogan: Competence and Ethics
Campaign slogan (French): Compétence et éthique
Policies: Develop a Police Complaints Bill of Rights for victims which include the general public & police officers; maximize the ratio of sworn vs unsworn police through attrition to reduce the impact of $151,000 annual compensation per person; appoint an Ottawa Ombudsman to review complaints about the Integrity Commissioner, Auditor General, Board or City Manager decisions in accordance with an Ottawa Civil & Property Bill of Rights; end home construction policies that disadvantage new home buyers; manage the city through an Income Equity Lens and place a 1% cap on taxes increases; invest approximately $63 million towards free transit for low-income residents, a rural home to shuttle LRT, and increase road maintenance through a 4-year hiring freeze on city employees and hire contractors to fill any gaps that may arise; end landfill methane emissions by building an ethanol zero-waste recycling center for weekly collection of organics, recycling, garbage, construction, electronics; and develop a bylaw regarding windmills.

==== Param Singh ====
Paramjit Singh, 46, is a police officer with the Ottawa Police Service. Singh is fluent in three languages: English, French, and Punjabi.

Candidacy registered: May 16, 2022
Campaign website: www.voteparam.com
Campaign slogan: A Vision for a Better Future
Campaign slogan (French): Une Vision pour un avenir meilleur

==== Jacob Solomon ====
Campaign logo

Jacob Solomon, 19, is a student at the University of Ottawa studying political science.

Candidacy registered: August 19, 2022
Campaign website: www.jacobsolomon.ca
Campaign slogan: I will fix this city

==== Mark Sutcliffe ====
Campaign logo

Mark Sutcliffe, 54, is an entrepreneur & business consultant, and a former local radio, print, & television media personality.

Candidacy announced: June 29, 2022
Candidacy registered: June 29, 2022
Campaign website: marksutcliffe.ca
Campaign slogan: Leadership for a safe, reliable, and affordable Ottawa.
Campaign slogan (French): Leadership pour une Ottawa sécuritaire, fiable, et abordable.
Policies: Funding police, fire and paramedic services, being tough on the causes of crime, restore confidence in public transit, improve roads, keep taxes, recreation fees and other costs as low as possible.

=== Declined or dropped out ===
- Bryan Brulotte, CEO and chair of employment firm MaxSys Staffing and Consulting (1993–present), deputy chief of staff to Paul Dick (1993), Progressive Conservative candidate for Lanark-Carleton in 2000
- Diane Deans, incumbent city councillor for Gloucester-Southgate Ward (1994–present). She had announced she would be running but dropped out. (Endorsed McKenney)
- Mathieu Fleury, incumbent city councillor for Rideau-Vanier (2010–present)
- Lisa MacLeod, incumbent MPP for Nepean; former provincial Minister of Tourism, Culture and Sport (2019–2022), Minister of Children, Community and Social Services and Minister Responsible for Women's Issues (2018–2019) (Endorsed Sutcliffe)
- Catherine McKenna, former MP for Ottawa Centre (2015–2021), former federal Minister of Environment and Climate Change (2015–2019) and Minister of Infrastructure and Communities (2019–2021) (Endorsed McKenney)
- Shawn Menard, incumbent city councilor for Capital Ward, former manager of government relations for the Federation of Canadian Municipalities (Running for re-election; endorsed McKenney)
- Jim Watson, incumbent mayor; former MPP for Ottawa West—Nepean (2003–2010), former provincial cabinet minister under Dalton McGuinty, former city councillor for Capital Ward (1991–1997)

=== Issues ===
2022 Ottawa mayoral election – issues and respective platforms
Issue	Bay	Chebib	Chiarelli	Couchman	Debassige	Guevara	Kadri
Budget			Concerns over city debt, cost of Lansdowne Live and new library.				
Support for Businesses	Expand Invest Ottawa programs for retail. New and expanded sister city partnerships, university collaborations, and global promotion.						
City Hall			Build a team mentality on council, consult with all of the players, balancing interests with priorities, understanding how all of the pieces fit together. Assist councillors in reaching their constituents' goals. Respect all councillors whether or not they agree with him, because they serve their community which is the mayor's community. Work in partnership with councillors, special interest groups, having an open door.				
COVID-19							
Emergency Services							
Energy and Environment	Offer more funding for green and Indigenous initiatives, the sciences and agriculture.						
Healthcare							
Housing	Eliminate R1 and R2 zoning, which will allow duplexes, triplexes, and townhomes city-wide, without changes to building heights. End development charges for construction in established neighbourhoods. Ban development of new strip malls city-wide, and intensify existing ones. Conduct pre-development work of all intensification targets immediately. Create a right of first offer program for homeowners, to protect their livelihood. Develop suburban city centres with homes.						
Infrastructure	Develop suburban city centres with shopping, services, and entertainment, and accelerate building complete "15-minute" communities						
Recreation	Offer more funding for entertainment industries. Expand Invest Ottawa programs for arts, entertainment, food and beverage. Create a centralized communication and promotion engine. Further city beautification and public art funding; Winterlude patios, canal opening ceremonies, and expanded facilities in city parks						
Regulation							
Social Assistance							
Taxation	Better balance the rural tax-to-service ratio.		Concerns over residential property tax increases to the average homeowner.				
Transportation	Replace commuter- with community-focused transit, including The Loop. Expand multi-use pathways, with better support for boaters and scooters.						
Waste Management							

2022 Ottawa mayoral election – issues and respective platforms (cont'd)
Issue	MacDonald	Maguire	McKenney	Olumide	Singh	Solomon	Sutcliffe
Budget							
Support for Businesses			Ensure that small businesses can thrive				
City Hall			Supports a city hall that works to improve life for everyone in the community and build a city that leaves no one behind. Restore trust, transparency and accountability. Supports more voices at City Hall that will fight for people.				
COVID-19							
Emergency Services							Will protect quality of life by adequately funding police, fire, and paramedic services and being tough on the causes of crime.
Energy and Environment			Fight climate change by shifting to clean, renewable energy. Committed to a greener, sustainable Ottawa with more trees and greenspace, putting climate action at the centre of all the city's decisions.				
Healthcare							
Housing			Wants to make sure everyone in Ottawa has a safe, affordable place to call home by tackling Ottawa's housing crisis head-on every single day.				Will work hard to address housing affordability
Infrastructure							
Recreation			Invest in recreation to get people out and moving. Have a plan to grow vibrant, creative neighbourhoods. Grow arts, entertainment and culture sector to build an Ottawa that brings joy to everyone, a thriving nightlife, as well as nurturing Ottawa's passion for innovation to further develop Ottawa's main streets.				Will work hard to recreation fees as low as possible.
Regulation							
Social Assistance			Reinvest in social services and supports for Ottawa's most vulnerable				
Taxation							Will work hard to keep taxes as low as possible.
Transportation			Invest in active transportation to get people out and moving. Make sure walking and biking are safe and convenient, and that no one struggles to move about our city year-round. Make bussing and the LRT easier and more convenient. Make our transit as affordable as possible to reduce congestion and everyone's commute times.				Will restore confidence in public transit system, improve roads, and make it easier for people to get around the city.
Waste Management							

=== Endorsements ===
	Chiarelli	Kadri	McKenney	Singh	Sutcliffe
City councillors			Shawn Menard; Theresa Kavanagh; Jeff Leiper; Diane Deans		Eli El-Chantiry; Jean Cloutier; Jan Harder
Federal politicians		Alexandre Boulerice	Peter Boehm		Jenna Sudds; Marie-France Lalonde; Yasir Naqvi; Chandra Arya; David McGuinty
Provincial politicians			Joel Harden; Chandra Pasma		Stephen Blais; Lisa MacLeod; John Fraser
Former politicians	Larry O'Brien; Richard Cannings		Catherine McKenna; Clive Doucet; Alex Cullen; Jaques Legendre; Ed Broadbent	Shad Qadri	John Baird; Marjory LeBreton; Madeleine Meilleur; Claudette Cain; Brian Coburn; Jim Durrell; Jacquelin Holzman; Don Boudria; Bob Monette; Peter Hume; Michael Qaqish; Rainer Bloess; Katherine Hobbs; Andy Haydon; Phil McNeely; Maria McRae
Media					Ottawa Citizen
Other	Brian Ford (Former Ottawa Police Chief)	Nazem Kadri (hockey player)	David Moscrop (Political theorist & author); Lynn Miles (Musician); Linda Silas (CFNU President); Jennifer Carr (PIPSC President); Leilani Farha (Former UN Special Rapporteur on Housing); Mark Carney (Former Governor of the Bank of Canada); Gerald Butts (Former PMO Principal Secretary); Anne McGrath (National Director of the New Democratic Party)		Séan McCann (Musician); Lisa Weagle (Olympic curler); Bob Plamondon (consultant)

== Polls ==
Voting intentions for Mayor of Ottawa

Polling firm	Source	Last date of polling	Sample Size (Note: Key: DV – decided voters AV – all voters)	MoE	Brandon Bay	Bob Chiarelli	Celine Debassige	Nour Kadri	Graham MacDonald	Mike Maguire	Catherine McKenney	Ade Olumide	Param Singh	Mark Sutcliffe	Undecided
2022 Ottawa mayoral election	HTML	October 24, 2022	316,254	—N/a	0.48	5.08	0.28	2.38	0.52	0.88	37.88	0.20	0.37	51.37	—N/a
Mainstreet Research	PDF	October 19, 2022	931 (DV)	± 3%	0.5%	5.0%	0.6%	0.5%	0.3%	1.3%	42.3%	-	11.3%	38.2%	-
Mainstreet Research	PDF	October 19, 2022	1,079 (AV)	± 3%	0.4%	4.2%	0.5%	0.4%	0.3%	1.1%	36.2%	-	9.6%	32.6%	14.5%
Mainstreet Research	PDF	October 7, 2022	1,141	± 2.9%	1.6%	6.8%	0.7%	1.2%	1.1%	1.5%	33.8%	-	0.8%	32.1%	20.1%
Nanos Research	PDF	October 3, 2022	503	N/A (Note: No margin of error was applied as the results were based on answers from a survey.)	0.8%	9.0%	-	0.9%	-	0.5%	29.0%	-	0.6%	24.0%	35.0%
Mainstreet Research	PDF	September 14, 2022	777	± 3.5%	0.4%	11.2%	0.8%	5.0%	-	1.5%	34.4%	-	1.2%	19.8%	23.6%
Mainstreet Research	PDF	July 23, 2022	663	± 3.8%	1.9%	6.5%	0.5%	-	1.2%	1.3%	34.3%	1.3%	0.5%	14.6%	37.8%

== Debates and forums ==
Debates and forums among candidates for the 2022 Ottawa mayoral election
No.	Date	Location	Host	Language	Key: P Participant A Absent N Non-invitee I Invitee TBD To be determined O Out of race (not registered/withdrawn/disqualified)														References
No.	Date	Location	Host	Language	Bay	Chebib	Chiarelli	Couchman	Debassige	Guevara	Kadri	Macdonald	Maguire	McKenney	Olumide	Singh	Solomon	Sutcliffe	References
1	August 16, 2022	Barrhaven	Community Associations for Environmental Sustainability	English	P	N	A	N	P	P	P	P	N	P	P	P	O	A	
2	August 30, 2022	Kanata	Community Associations for Environmental Sustainability	English	P	P	P	N	P	P	P	A	N	P	P	P	A	P	
3	September 7, 2022	Orleans	Community Associations for Environmental Sustainability	English	P	P	A	N	P	A	P	A	P	P	P	A	A	A	
4	September 28, 2022	Centretown	Community Associations for Environmental Sustainability	English	P	N	P	N	N	N	P	N	N	P	N	N	N	P	
5	October 3, 2022	Sandy Hill	Ottawa Arts Council	Bilingual	A	N	N	P (Note: Couchman was later removed from the debate after refusing to apologize to Catherine McKenney for a comment made regarding their pronouns.)	N	N	P	N	P	P	P	P	N	P	
6	October 12, 2022	Nepean	Greater Ottawa Home; Builders' Association	English	N	N	P	N	N	N	N	N	N	P	N	N	N	P	
7	October 12, 2022	Centrepointe	Ottawa Board of Trade	English	Cancelled (Note: The debate was cancelled due to Catherine McKenney pulling out as they were summoned to appear before a public inquiry into the Emergencies Act the next day, which they had said they required time to prepare for.)														
8	October 13, 2022	ByWard Market	Alliance to End; Homelessness Ottawa	English	N	N	A	N	N	N	P	N	N	P	N	N	N	P	
9	October 13, 2022	ByWard Market	CTV Ottawa	English	N	N	P	N	N	N	N	N	N	P	N	N	N	P	
10	October 17, 2022	The Glebe	Glebe Community Association	English	N	N	P	N	N	N	P	N	N	P	N	N	N	P	
11	October 18, 2022	Centretown	CBC Ottawa	English	N	N	P	N	N	N	P	N	N	P	N	N	N	P	
12	October 20, 2022	Carleton; University	United Way Eastern Ontario; Ottawa Board of Trade; Ottawa and District Labour Council	English	N	N	N	N	N	N	N	N	N	P	N	N	N	P	

== Mayoral results ==
2022 Ottawa municipal election: Mayor
Candidate	Popular vote			Expenditures
Candidate	Votes	%	±%	Expenditures
Mark Sutcliffe	161,679	51.37	–	$537,834.79
Catherine McKenney	119,241	37.88	–	$542,847.97
Bob Chiarelli	15,998	5.08	–	$96,844.84
Nour Kadri	7,496	2.38	–	$71,062.45
Mike Maguire	2,775	0.88	–	$5,500.00
Graham MacDonald	1,629	0.52	–	$5,334.50
Brandon Bay	1,512	0.48	–	$9,478.02
Param Singh	1,176	0.37	–	$13,650.40
Celine Debassige	867	0.28	–	none listed
Ade Olumide	636	0.20	–	$1,966.25
Gregory Jreg Guevara	584	0.19	–	$2,349.61
Bernard Couchman	471	0.15	-0.21	none listed
Jacob Solomon	432	0.14	–	none listed
Zed Chebib	264	0.08	–	none listed
Total valid votes	314,760	99.53		
Total rejected, unmarked and declined votes	1,500	0.47	-0.92	
Turnout	316,260	43.79	+1.24	
Eligible voters	722,227			
Note: Candidate campaign colours are based on the prominent colour used in campaign items (signs, literature, etc.) and are used as a visual differentiation between candidates.
Sources: City of Ottawa

=== Detailed results ===
Results by ward
Ward	Bay		Chebib		Chiarelli		Couchman		Debassige		Guevara		Kadri		Macdonald		Maguire		McKenney		Olumide		Singh		Solomon		Sutcliffe	
Ward	Votes	%	Votes	%	Votes	%	Votes	%	Votes	%	Votes	%	Votes	%	Votes	%	Votes	%	Votes	%	Votes	%	Votes	%	Votes	%	Votes	%
Orléans East-Cumberland	60	0.41	12	0.08	721	4.90	25	0.17	33	0.22	26	0.18	253	1.72	65	0.44	98	0.67	4,026	27.35	33	0.22	50	0.34	20	0.14	9,296	63.16
Orléans West-Innes	64	0.41	12	0.08	793	5.07	22	0.14	51	0.33	26	0.17	292	1.87	41	0.26	135	0.86	4,902	31.35	29	0.19	45	0.29	20	0.13	9,203	58.86
Barrhaven West	72	0.59	6	0.05	558	4.56	18	0.15	20	0.16	19	0.16	353	2.88	78	0.64	108	0.88	3,263	26.67	67	0.55	64	0.52	16	0.13	7,595	62.07
Kanata North	53	0.50	12	0.11	517	4.84	12	0.11	14	0.13	20	0.19	286	2.68	50	0.47	79	0.74	3,112	29.11	15	0.14	51	0.48	6	0.06	6,463	60.46
West Carleton-March	27	0.30	5	0.06	409	4.55	12	0.13	14	0.16	13	0.14	108	1.20	64	0.71	86	0.96	1,847	20.55	9	0.10	21	0.23	10	0.11	6,362	70.79
Stittsville	45	0.39	6	0.05	498	4.33	15	0.13	26	0.23	24	0.21	232	2.02	87	0.76	102	0.89	3,080	26.80	26	0.23	47	0.41	9	0.08	7,297	63.49
Bay	67	0.47	7	0.05	967	6.73	35	0.24	37	0.26	32	0.22	254	1.77	87	0.61	107	0.74	6,118	42.55	20	0.14	43	0.30	22	0.15	6,582	45.78
College	69	0.44	11	0.07	903	5.70	21	0.13	38	0.24	28	0.18	252	1.59	86	0.54	143	0.90	5,894	37.79	19	0.12	40	0.25	36	0.23	8,204	51.81
Knoxdale-Merivale	62	0.55	6	0.05	615	5.42	9	0.08	23	0.20	24	0.21	210	1.85	53	0.47	117	1.03	3,654	32.23	17	0.15	25	0.22	35	0.31	6,489	57.23
Gloucester-Southgate	72	0.69	20	0.19	640	6.13	18	0.17	40	0.38	28	0.27	888	8.50	58	0.56	80	0.77	3,325	31.82	22	0.21	42	0.40	18	0.17	5,197	49.74
Beacon Hill-Cyrville	46	0.52	5	0.06	464	5.23	19	0.21	38	0.43	20	0.23	243	2.74	31	0.35	63	0.71	3,400	38.30	16	0.18	26	0.29	6	0.07	4,501	50.70
Rideau-Vanier	81	0.70	14	0.12	502	4.35	42	0.36	101	0.87	32	0.28	211	1.83	51	0.44	80	0.69	6,676	57.80	31	0.27	29	0.25	25	0.22	3,676	31.82
Rideau-Rockcliffe	42	0.41	17	0.17	524	5.17	33	0.33	48	0.47	19	0.19	251	2.48	44	0.43	73	0.72	4,679	46.18	23	0.23	20	0.20	20	0.20	4,338	42.82
Somerset	61	0.47	13	0.10	245	1.91	9	0.07	25	0.19	43	0.33	152	1.18	24	0.19	62	0.48	9,423	73.29	10	0.08	26	0.20	12	0.09	2,753	21.41
Kitchissippi	38	0.26	3	0.02	408	2.77	10	0.07	21	0.14	23	0.16	162	1.10	32	0.22	57	0.39	9,128	61.96	9	0.06	10	0.07	15	0.10	4,816	32.69
River	67	0.54	14	0.11	702	5.62	20	0.16	28	0.22	22	0.18	376	3.01	67	0.54	94	0.75	5,309	42.49	20	0.16	38	0.30	15	0.12	5,723	45.80
Capital Ward	52	0.38	6	0.04	329	2.42	20	0.15	31	0.23	33	0.24	210	1.55	38	0.28	63	0.46	8,448	62.22	18	0.13	22	0.16	15	0.11	4,293	31.62
Alta Vista	46	0.37	20	0.16	655	5.23	18	0.14	34	0.27	19	0.15	329	2.63	64	0.51	83	0.66	5,417	43.25	18	0.14	43	0.34	23	0.18	5,757	45.96
Orléans South-Navan	56	0.52	7	0.06	527	4.89	17	0.16	38	0.35	8	0.07	306	2.84	33	0.31	69	0.64	2,958	27.45	61	0.57	59	0.55	20	0.19	6,616	61.40
Osgoode	37	0.36	4	0.04	489	4.70	11	0.11	31	0.30	19	0.18	97	0.93	59	0.57	156	1.50	1,684	16.18	13	0.12	22	0.21	12	0.12	7,771	74.69
Rideau-Jock	41	0.41	3	0.03	350	0.46	6	0.06	16	0.16	8	0.08	88	0.87	67	0.66	172	1.70	1,894	18.75	8	0.08	25	0.25	11	0.11	7,414	73.38
Riverside South-Findlay Creek	30	0.38	13	0.16	312	3.91	8	0.10	12	0.15	5	0.06	559	7.01	37	0.46	91	1.14	2,203	27.62	23	0.29	78	0.98	9	0.11	4,595	57.62
Kanata South	60	0.41	14	0.10	744	5.10	19	0.13	28	0.19	40	0.27	305	2.09	107	0.73	161	1.10	4,542	31.11	27	0.18	92	0.63	7	0.05	8,452	57.90
Barrhaven East	55	0.58	9	0.10	441	4.68	15	0.16	16	0.17	17	0.18	379	4.02	56	0.59	88	0.93	2,721	28.89	40	0.42	45	0.48	10	0.11	5,528	58.68
Special Advance Voting (Note: Voters who vote in the special advance voting period can vote across the city and are thus labelled in their own category.)	209	0.72	26	0.09	2,685	9.27	37	0.13	104	0.36	36	0.12	701	2.42	250	0.86	408	1.41	11,442	39.50	62	0.21	213	0.74	40	0.14	12,756	44.03
Total	1,512	0.48	265	0.08	15,998	5.08	471	0.15	867	0.28	584	0.19	7,497	2.38	1,629	0.52	2,775	0.88	119,235	37.88	636	0.20	1,176	0.37	432	0.14	161,677	51.37

== City Council ==
Map of Ottawa's 24 new wards used in this election.: 1. Orléans East-Cumberland Ward; 2. Orléans West-Innes Ward; 3. Barrhaven West Ward; 4. Kanata North Ward; 5. West Carleton-March Ward; 6. Stittsville Ward; 7. Bay Ward; 8. College Ward; 9. Knoxdale-Merivale Ward; 10. Gloucester-Southgate Ward; 11. Beacon Hill-Cyrville Ward; 12. Rideau-Vanier Ward; 13. Rideau-Rockcliffe Ward; 14. Somerset Ward; 15. Kitchissippi Ward; 16. River Ward; 17. Capital Ward; 18. Alta Vista Ward; 19. Orléans South-Navan Ward; 20. Osgoode Ward; 21. Rideau-Jock Ward; 22. Riverside South-Findlay Creek Ward; 23. Kanata South Ward.; 24. Barrhaven East Ward.

=== Ward results ===
==== Orléans East-Cumberland Ward ====
Incumbent city councillor Matthew Luloff was elected in 2018 with 23.76% of the vote. He ran again and was re-elected.

Nominated candidates

- Rosemee Cantave, research coordinator
- Tessa Franklin, former concert promoter
- Matthew Luloff, incumbent city councillor

Results

2022 Ottawa municipal election: Orléans East—Cumberland Ward
Candidate	Popular vote			Expenditures
Candidate	Votes	%	±%	Expenditures
Matthew Luloff (X)	11,919	74.17	+50.41	$38,095.39
Rosemee Cantave	2,376	14.79	—	$3,040.70
Tessa Franklin	1,775	11.05	—	$5,869.92
Total valid votes	16,070	97.82		
Total rejected, unmarked and declined votes	358	2.18		
Turnout	16,428	42.54	-0.60	
Eligible voters	38,618			
Note: Candidate campaign colours are based on the prominent colour used in campaign items (signs, literature, etc.) and are used as a visual differentiation between candidates.
Sources: City of Ottawa

==== Orléans West-Innes Ward ====
Incumbent city councillor Laura Dudas was elected in 2018 with 41.37% of the vote. She ran again and was re-elected.

Nominated candidates

- Laura Dudas, incumbent city councillor
- Chris Fraser, candidate for this ward in 2010 and 2014
- Lori Stinson, professor at Carleton University and University of Ottawa

Results

2022 Ottawa municipal election: Orléans West-Innes
Candidate	Popular vote			Expenditures
Candidate	Votes	%	±%	Expenditures
Laura Dudas (X)	11,821	71.43	+30.06	$24,969.84
Lori Stinson	3,309	19.99	—	$7,916.79
Chris Fraser	1,420	8.58	—	$2,715.17
Total valid votes	16,550	97.99		
Total rejected, unmarked and declined votes	339	2.01		
Turnout	16,889	45.22	+1.45	
Eligible voters	37,347			
Note: Candidate campaign colours are based on the prominent colour used in campaign items (signs, literature, etc.) and are used as a visual differentiation between candidates.
Sources: City of Ottawa

==== Barrhaven West Ward ====
Incumbent city councillor Jan Harder was re-elected in 2018 with 74.27% of the vote. She did not seek re-election.

Nominated candidates

- Jay Chadha, project manager at OC Transpo
- Sadaf Ebrahim, host and producer at Canadian Peoples Channel
- David Hill, former member of the Canadian Armed Forces
- Taayo Simmonds, lawyer

Results

2022 Ottawa municipal election: Barrhaven West
Candidate	Popular vote			Expenditures
Candidate	Votes	%	±%	Expenditures
David Hill	6,230	43.97	—	$30,854.44
Taayo Simmonds	4,737	33.43	—	$27,438.70
Jay Chadha	2,200	15.53	—	$32,988.38
Sadaf Ebrahim	1,001	7.07	—	$9,629.82
Total valid votes	14,168	98.35		
Total rejected, unmarked and declined votes	238	1.65		
Turnout	14,406	45.81	+3.10	
Eligible voters	31,446			
Note: Candidate campaign colours are based on the prominent colour used in campaign items (signs, literature, etc.) and are used as a visual differentiation between candidates.
Sources: City of Ottawa

==== Kanata North Ward ====
Incumbent city councillor Cathy Curry was appointed to the seat on November 10, 2021, after her predecessor, Jenna Sudds, was elected as Member of Parliament for Kanata—Carleton on September 20, 2021. She ran again seeking a full-term and was re-elected.

Nominated candidates

- Viorel Copil, chief financial management advisor for the Canada Border Services Agency
- Cathy Curry, incumbent city councillor
- Christine Moulaison, co-chair of the Ottawa-Carleton Assembly of Schools Councils

Results

2022 Ottawa municipal election: Kanata North
Candidate	Popular vote			Expenditures
Candidate	Votes	%	±%	Expenditures
Cathy Curry (X)	8,827	76.75	—	$17,217.62
Viorel Copil	1,583	13.37	—	$5,866.28
Christine Moulaison	1,136	9.88	—	none listed
Total valid votes	11,501	97.44		
Total rejected, unmarked and declined votes	302	2.56		
Turnout	11,803	43.54	-4.67	
Eligible voters	27108			
Note: Candidate campaign colours are based on the prominent colour used in campaign items (signs, literature, etc.) and are used as a visual differentiation between candidates.
Sources: City of Ottawa

==== West Carleton-March Ward ====
Incumbent city councillor Eli El-Chantiry was re-elected in 2018 with 65.90% of the vote. He did not seek re-election.

Nominated candidates

- Colin Driscoll
- Sasha Duguay, legislative assistant to Conservative MP Glen Motz
- Clarke Kelly, legislative assistant to Liberal MP Ryan Turnbull
- Ian Madill
- Stephanie Maghnam, 2018 provincial Liberal candidate in Kanata—Carleton
- Greg Patacairk, president of the Dunrobin community association
- Nagmani Sharma, software engineer

Results

2022 Ottawa municipal election: West Carleton-March
Candidate	Popular vote			Expenditures
Candidate	Votes	%	±%	Expenditures
Clarke Kelly	2,550	27.40	—	$17,556.65
Sasha Duguay	2,307	24.79	—	$21,640.16
Greg Patacairk	1,988	21.36	—	$12,444.67
Stephanie Maghnam	1,404	15.09	—	$9,771.47
Nagmani Sharma	542	5.82	—	$10,561.69
Ian Madill	438	4.71	—	$7,290.88
Colin Driscoll	78	0.84	—	$38.39
Total valid votes	9307	98.56		
Total rejected, unmarked and declined votes	136	1.44		
Turnout	9443	46.95	+4.15	
Eligible voters	20,113			
Note: Candidate campaign colours are based on the prominent colour used in campaign items (signs, literature, etc.) and are used as a visual differentiation between candidates.
Sources: City of Ottawa

==== Stittsville Ward ====
Incumbent city councillor Glen Gower was elected in 2018 with 57.86% of the vote. He ran again and was re-elected with a slight gain in vote share.

Nominated candidates

- Mathew Duchesne, realtor
- Glen Gower, incumbent city councillor
- Tanya Hein, former president of the Stittsville Village Association
- Kevin Hua, federal NDP candidate in Carleton in 2019 and 2021

Results

2022 Ottawa municipal election: Stittsville
Candidate	Popular vote			Expenditures
Candidate	Votes	%	±%	Expenditures
Glen Gower (X)	7,758	58.67	+0.81	$18,453.69
Mathew Duchesne	2,692	20.36	—	$9,568.19
Tanya Hein	1,528	11.56	—	$4,904.85
Kevin Hua	1,244	9.41	—	$9,434.91
Total valid votes	13,222	98.99		
Total rejected, unmarked and declined votes	135	1.01		
Turnout	13,357	45.59	-0.78	
Eligible voters	29,298			
Note: Candidate campaign colours are based on the prominent colour used in campaign items (signs, literature, etc.) and are used as a visual differentiation between candidates.
Sources: City of Ottawa

==== Bay Ward ====
Incumbent city councillor Theresa Kavanagh was elected in 2018 with 55.17% of the vote. She ran again and was re-elected.

Nominated candidates

- Othman Alhusain
- Robert Hill, former student advisor to the Minister of Education
- Theresa Kavanagh, incumbent city councillor

Results

2022 Ottawa municipal election: Bay
Candidate	Popular vote			Expenditures
Candidate	Votes	%	±%	Expenditures
Theresa Kavanagh (X)	12,398	82.79	+27.62	$27,256.02
Robert Hill	1,659	11.08	–	$497.36
Othman Alhusain	919	6.14	–	$250.00
Total valid votes	14,976	96.45		
Total rejected, unmarked and declined votes	551	3.55		
Turnout	15,527	43.77	+2.14	
Eligible voters	35473			
Note: Candidate campaign colours are based on the prominent colour used in campaign items (signs, literature, etc.) and are used as a visual differentiation between candidates.

==== College Ward ====
Incumbent city councillor Rick Chiarelli was re-elected in 2018 with 46.79% of the vote. He had indicated he "expected" to run for re-election, but ultimately chose not to file.

Nominated candidates

- Wendy Davidson, vice-president of the City View/Ryan Farm Community Association
- Laine Johnson, director of tenant and community engagement at Centretown Citizens Ottawa Corporation.
- Granda Kopytko, National Executive Director of the Canadian Association of Professional Employees
- Pat McGarry, funeral director
- Vilteau Delvas, Ontario Party candidate for Ottawa West—Nepean in 2022

Results

2022 Ottawa municipal election: College
Candidate	Popular vote			Expenditures
Candidate	Votes	%	±%	Expenditures
Laine Johnson	8,899	52.64	–	$46,702.32
Pat McGarry	5,652	33.43	–	$42,760.92
Wendy Davidson	1,338	7.91	–	$6,942.93
Granda Kopytko	649	3.84	–	$3,880.01
Vilteau Delvas	368	2.18	–	$2,264.50
Total valid votes	16,906	97.54		
Total rejected, unmarked and declined votes	427	2.46		
Turnout	17,333	46.90	+2.10	
Eligible voters	36,958			
Note: Candidate campaign colours are based on the prominent colour used in campaign items (signs, literature, etc.) and are used as a visual differentiation between candidates.

==== Knoxdale-Merivale Ward ====
Incumbent city councillor Keith Egli was re-elected in 2018 with 63.12% of the vote. He did not seek re-election.

Nominated candidates

- Joseph Ben-Ami, conservative writer, strategist and organizer
- James Dean, real-estate agent, board member of Quality Living House Cooperative and candidate for this ward in 2006, 2010, 2018
- Sean Devine, funding officer at Canada Council, former president of the Trend Arlington Community Association, and federal NDP candidate in Nepean in 2015 and 2021
- Myles Egli, brother of incumbent councillor Keith Egli and president of the Manordale-Woodvale Community Association
- Peter Anthony Weber, heavy equipment operator and candidate for this ward in 2018
- Peter Westaway, bike mechanic
- Michael Wood, professor at Algonquin College

Results

2022 Ottawa municipal election: Knoxdale-Merivale Ward
Candidate	Popular vote			Expenditures
Candidate	Votes	%	±%	Expenditures
Sean Devine	4,812	39.20	–	$28,355.68
James Dean	2,564	20.89	+1.05	N/A
Myles Egli	2,051	16.71	–	$8,246.44
Joseph Ben-Ami	1,426	11.62	–	N/A
Michael Wood	1,228	10.00	–	$8,980.62
Peter Westaway	118	0.96	–	$1,422.74
Peter Anthony Weber	77	0.63	-1.99	$1,306.54
Total valid votes	12,276	97.47		
Total rejected, unmarked and declined votes	318	2.53		
Turnout	12,594	45.55	+5.52	
Eligible voters	27,650			
Note: Candidate campaign colours are based on the prominent colour used in campaign items (signs, literature, etc.) and are used as a visual differentiation between candidates.

==== Gloucester-Southgate Ward ====
Incumbent city councillor Diane Deans was re-elected in 2018 with 56.08% of the vote. She had announced that she would not be seeking re-election in order to run for mayor, but later declared she would not run for either.

Nominated candidates

- Aria Alavi, journalist and owner of Edict Legal Services
- Jessica Bradley, executive assistant to Diane Deans
- Taylor Houstoun, project manager
- Ron Keays
- Hussein Mahmoud, business planning consultant, candidate for Alta Vista Ward in 2014
- John Redins, disability rights advocate and perennial candidate

Results

2022 Ottawa municipal election: Gloucester—Southgate
Candidate	Popular vote			Expenditures
Candidate	Votes	%	±%	Expenditures
Jessica Bradley	4,927	42.24	–	$13,893.10
Hussein Mahmoud	2,809	24.08	–	$21,813.90
Taylor Houstoun	2,557	21.92	–	$8,357.68
Aria Alavi	716	6.14	–	$2500.00
John Redins	333	2.85	–	$1509.99
Ron Keays	323	2.77	–	N/A
Total valid votes	11,665	96.72		
Total rejected, unmarked and declined votes	396	3.28		
Turnout	12,061	37.53	-0.67	
Eligible voters	32,139			
Note: Candidate campaign colours are based on the prominent colour used in campaign items (signs, literature, etc.) and are used as a visual differentiation between candidates.

==== Beacon Hill-Cyrville Ward ====
Incumbent city councillor Tim Tierney was re-elected in 2018 with 81.34% of the vote. He ran again and was re-elected.

Nominated candidates

- Nicolas Castro
- Miranda Gray, project manager, candidate for Orléans Ward in 2018
- Tim Tierney, incumbent city councillor

Results

2022 Ottawa municipal election: Beacon Hill—Cyrville
Candidate	Popular vote			Expenditures
Candidate	Votes	%	±%	Expenditures
Tim Tierney (X)	7,617	81.96	+0.62	$26,325.77
Miranda Gray	1,265	13.61	–	$374.37
Nicolas Castro	411	4.42	–	$90.62
Total valid votes	9,293	97.14		
Total rejected, unmarked and declined votes	274	2.86		
Turnout	9,567	40.79	+2.73	
Eligible voters	23,452			
Note: Candidate campaign colours are based on the prominent colour used in campaign items (signs, literature, etc.) and are used as a visual differentiation between candidates.

==== Rideau-Vanier Ward ====
Incumbent city councillor Mathieu Fleury was re-elected in 2018 with 68.08% of the vote. He did not seek re-election.

Nominated candidates

- Patrick Auguste
- Hicham Boutelab
- Tyler Cybulski
- Burthomley Douzable, owner of The Family Restaurant
- Julie Fiala, artist and provincial Independent candidate for Ottawa—Vanier in the 2020 by-election
- Jwane Izzetpanah
- Kim Leclerc
- Alex Osorio, pastor at Fire of God Ministries
- Stéphanie Plante
- Laura Shantz, University of Ottawa professor

Results

2022 Ottawa municipal election: Rideau—Vanier
Candidate	Popular vote			Expenditures
Candidate	Votes	%	±%	Expenditures
Stéphanie Plante	4,621	37.15	–	$27,931.57
Laura Shantz	4,298	34.55	–	$33,925.70
Julie Fiala	704	5.66	–	$2,474.75
Alex Osorio	671	5.39	–	$2,802.40
Jwane Izzetpanah	564	4.53	–	N/A
Tyler Cybulski	514	4.13	–	$1,301.77
Patrick Auguste	330	2.65	–	$5,038.93
Kim Leclerc	296	2.38	–	$3,954.47
Burthomley Douzable	266	2.14	–	$9,520.25
Hicham Boutaleb	176	1.41	–	$600.00
Total valid votes	12,440	96.78		
Total rejected, unmarked and declined votes	414	3.22		
Turnout	12,854	37.18	-0.36	
Eligible voters	34,574			
Note: Candidate campaign colours are based on the prominent colour used in campaign items (signs, literature, etc.) and are used as a visual differentiation between candidates.

==== Rideau-Rockcliffe Ward ====
Incumbent city councillor Rawlson King was elected to the seat in a by-election on April 15, 2019, after his predecessor, Tobi Nussbaum, resigned to accept an appointment to become the CEO of the National Capital Commission on January 26, 2019. He ran again and was re-elected.

Nominated candidates

- Clayton Fitzsimmons, realtor
- Peter Jan Karwacki, candidate for this ward in the 2019 by-election
- Rawlson King, incumbent city councillor
- Peter Zanette

Results

2022 Ottawa municipal election: Rideau—Rockcliffe
Candidate	Popular vote			Expenditures
Candidate	Votes	%	±%	Expenditures
Rawlson King (X)	8,481	80.14	+61.78	$23,195.86
Clayton Fitzsimmons	859	8.12	–	N/A
Peter Jan Karwacki	716	6.77	+6.19	$178.54
Peter Zanette	527	4.98	–	$131.01
Total valid votes	10,583	94.36		
Total rejected, unmarked and declined votes	633	5.64		
Turnout	11,216	39.74	+2.59	
Eligible voters	28,220			
Note: Candidate campaign colours are based on the prominent colour used in campaign items (signs, literature, etc.) and are used as a visual differentiation between candidates.

==== Somerset Ward ====
Incumbent city councillor Catherine McKenney was re-elected in 2018 with 76.66% of the vote. They did not seek re-election in order to run for mayor.

Nominated candidates

- Stuart MacKay, co-founder of Ottawa Transit Riders and former board member of the Centretown Community Association (CCA)
- Brandon Russell, political operative and provincial Independent candidate for Kamloops-North Thompson, BC in 2020
- Ariel Troster, communications professional

Results

2022 Ottawa municipal election: Somerset
Candidate	Popular vote			Expenditures
Candidate	Votes	%	±%	Expenditures
Ariel Troster	8,669	61.28	–	$30,781.77
Stuart MacKay	4,706	33.29	–	$12,259.65
Brandon Russell	768	5.43	–	N/A
Total valid votes	14,137	95.31		
Total rejected, unmarked and declined votes	695	4.69		
Turnout	14,832	45.24	+6.14	
Eligible voters	32,787			
Note: Candidate campaign colours are based on the prominent colour used in campaign items (signs, literature, etc.) and are used as a visual differentiation between candidates.

==== Kitchissippi Ward ====
Incumbent city councillor Jeff Leiper was re-elected in 2018 with 85.28% of the vote. He ran again and was re-elected.

Nominated candidates

- Oonagh Elizabeth Fitzgerald, senior general counsel at the Department of National Defence
- Jeff Leiper, incumbent city councillor
- Daniel Stringer, former aide to Liberal MPP Richard Patten and candidate for this ward in 2003, 2006, 2010, 2018

Results

2022 Ottawa municipal election: Kitchissippi
Candidate	Popular vote			Expenditures
Candidate	Votes	%	±%	Expenditures
Jeff Leiper (X)	11,055	71.97	-13.31	$23,475.35
Oonagh Fitzgerald	3,247	21.14	–	$5,167.81
Dan Stringer	1,058	6.89	-7.83	$25,691.03
Total valid votes	15,360	97.78		
Total rejected, unmarked and declined votes	348	2.22		
Turnout	15,708	53.03	+4.15	
Eligible voters	29,621			
Note: Candidate campaign colours are based on the prominent colour used in campaign items (signs, literature, etc.) and are used as a visual differentiation between candidates.

==== River Ward ====
Incumbent city councillor Riley Brockington was re-elected in 2018 with 54.50% of the vote. He ran again and was re-elected.

Nominated candidates

- Riley Brockington, incumbent city councillor
- Alex Dugal
- Ethan Sabourin, former legislative assistant to NDP MP Leah Gazan

Results

2022 Ottawa municipal election: River
Candidate	Popular vote			Expenditures
Candidate	Votes	%	±%	Expenditures
Riley Brockington (X)	9,595	73.08	+18.58	$24,429.85
Ethan Sabourin	2,396	18.25	–	$9,781.58
Alex Dugal	1,139	8.67	–	$2,441.01
Total valid votes	13,130	96.83		
Total rejected, unmarked and declined votes	430	3.17		
Turnout	13,560	41.06	+2.51	
Eligible voters	33,024			
Note: Candidate campaign colours are based on the prominent colour used in campaign items (signs, literature, etc.) and are used as a visual differentiation between candidates.

==== Capital Ward ====
Incumbent city councillor Shawn Menard was elected in 2018 with 28.12% of the vote. He ran again and was re-elected.

Nominated candidates

- Rebecca Jaremko Bromwich, lawyer and adjunct professor of law at Carleton University
- Shawn Menard, incumbent city councillor
- Daniel Rogers

Results

2022 Ottawa municipal election: Capital
Candidate	Popular vote			Expenditures
Candidate	Votes	%	±%	Expenditures
Shawn Menard (X)	11,358	78.81	+50.69	$35,177.03
Rebecca Bromwich	1,986	13.78	–	$16,704.75
Daniel Rogers	1,068	7.41	–	$5,439.96
Total valid votes	14,412	97.48		
Total rejected, unmarked and declined votes	372	2.52		
Turnout	14,784	51.27	-0.86	
Eligible voters	28,834			
Note: Candidate campaign colours are based on the prominent colour used in campaign items (signs, literature, etc.) and are used as a visual differentiation between candidates.

==== Alta Vista Ward ====
Incumbent city councillor Jean Cloutier was re-elected in 2018 with 32.81% of the vote. He did not seek re-election.

Nominated candidates

- Marty Carr, former president of the Alta Vista community association
- Carolyn Kropp, executive assistant to Ottawa South MPP John Fraser
- Bob Perkins, vice president of real estate advisory at Deloitte Canada
- Angelo Gino Scaffidi

Results

2022 Ottawa municipal election: Alta Vista
Candidate	Popular vote			Expenditures
Candidate	Votes	%	±%	Expenditures
Marty Carr	6,088	47.12	–	$15,185.28
Carolyn Kropp	4,107	31.79	–	$22,624.30
Bob Perkins	2,453	18.99	–	$13,518.92
Angelo Gino Scaffidi	271	2.10	–	$2,829.47
Total valid votes	12,919	96.70		
Total rejected, unmarked and declined votes	441	3.30		
Turnout	13,360	43.09	+1.36	
Eligible voters	31,008			
Note: Candidate campaign colours are based on the prominent colour used in campaign items (signs, literature, etc.) and are used as a visual differentiation between candidates.

==== Orléans South—Navan Ward ====
Incumbent city councillor Catherine Kitts was elected to the seat in a by-election on October 5, 2020, with 54.44% of the vote after her predecessor, Stephen Blais, was elected as Member of Provincial Parliament for Orléans on February 27, 2020. She ran again seeking a full-term and was re-elected.

Nominated candidates

- Yvette Ashiri, 2020 Cumberland Ward by-election candidate
- Catherine Kitts, incumbent city councillor
- Shamsa Sheikh Ahmed

Results

2022 Ottawa municipal election: Orléans South—Navan
Candidate	Popular vote			Expenditures
Candidate	Votes	%	±%	Expenditures
Catherine Kitts (X)	9,466	76.47	+22.03	$22,828.93
Yvette Ashiri	2,716	21.94	+0.02	$15,715.70
Shamsa Sheikh Ahmed	196	1.58	–	N/A
Total valid votes	12,378	98.57		
Total rejected, unmarked and declined votes	180	1.43		
Turnout	12,558	39.22	+1.22	
Eligible voters	32,023			
Note: Candidate campaign colours are based on the prominent colour used in campaign items (signs, literature, etc.) and are used as a visual differentiation between candidates.

==== Osgoode Ward ====
Incumbent city councillor George Darouze was re-elected in 2018 with 54.86% of the vote. He ran again and was re-elected by a close margin.

Nominated candidates

- George Darouze, incumbent city councillor
- Bruce Anthony Faulkner, 2014 and 2018 provincial Libertarian candidate in Ottawa Centre, candidate for Kanata South in 2014
- Bob Masaro, candidate for this ward in 2010 and 2014
- Dan O'Brien
- Doug Thompson, former city councillor for Osgoode Ward

Results

2022 Ottawa municipal election: Osgoode
Candidate	Popular vote			Expenditures
Candidate	Votes	%	±%	Expenditures
George Darouze (X)	4,353	40.81	-14.05	$29,980.82
Doug Thompson	4,115	38.58	–	$22,147.13
Dan O'Brien	1,541	14.45	–	$11,093.45
Bob Masaro	432	4.05	–	$5,560.02
Bruce Anthony Faulkner	226	2.12	–	N/A
Total valid votes	10,667	98.95		
Total rejected, unmarked and declined votes	113	1.05		
Turnout	10,780	46.16	+0.32	
Eligible voters	23,354			
Note: Candidate campaign colours are based on the prominent colour used in campaign items (signs, literature, etc.) and are used as a visual differentiation between candidates.

==== Rideau—Jock Ward ====
Incumbent city councillor Scott Moffatt was re-elected in 2018 with 55.81% of the vote. He did not seek re-election.

Nominated candidates

- David Brown, political staffer, former assistant to incumbent councillor Scott Moffatt, former president of the Richmond Agricultural Society, and candidate for this ward in 2018
- Leigh-Andrea Brunet, businesswoman and educator
- Michael J. Nowak, President and CEO at CODE Incorporated
- Patty Searl, CEO of Clean POV Ottawa
- Kevin Setia

Results

2022 Ottawa municipal election: Rideau—Jock Ward
Candidate	Popular vote			Expenditures
Candidate	Votes	%	±%	Expenditures
David Brown	6,901	66.64	+22.45	$24,118.32
Leigh-Andrea Brunet	1,654	15.97	–	$7,762.09
Kevin Setia	1,201	11.60	–	$11,620.00
Patty Searl	349	3.37	–	N/A
Michael J. Nowak	251	2.42	–	N/A
Total valid votes	10,356	98.03		
Total rejected, unmarked and declined votes	208	1.97		
Turnout	10,564	48.09	+1.89	
Eligible voters	21,966			
Note: Candidate campaign colours are based on the prominent colour used in campaign items (signs, literature, etc.) and are used as a visual differentiation between candidates.

==== Riverside South—Findlay Creek Ward ====
Incumbent city councillor Carol Anne Meehan was elected in 2018 with 42.55% of the vote. She initially announced she was running for re-election in the new Barrhaven East Ward, but later announced she was not running for re-election.

Nominated candidates

- Zainab Alsalihiy, public servant at Elections Canada
- Steve Desroches, former city councillor
- Salah Elsaadi
- Em McLellan

Results

2022 Ottawa municipal election: Riverside South—Findlay Creek
Candidate	Popular vote			Expenditures
Candidate	Votes	%	±%	Expenditures
Steve Desroches	5,682	67.89	–	$18,965.77
Zainab Alsalihiy	1,533	18.32	–	N/A
Salah Elsaadi	900	10.75	–	$17,652.90
Em McLellan	255	3.05	–	N/A
Total valid votes	8,370	98.47		
Total rejected, unmarked and declined votes	130	1.53		
Turnout	8,500	42.88	-3.21	
Eligible voters	19,822			
Note: Candidate campaign colours are based on the prominent colour used in campaign items (signs, literature, etc.) and are used as a visual differentiation between candidates.

==== Kanata South Ward ====
Incumbent city councillor Allan Hubley was re-elected in 2018 with 45.53% of the vote. He ran again and was re-elected.

Nominated candidates

- Erin Coffin, senior advisor at Health Canada
- Mike Dawson
- Rouba Fattal, public servant at Innovation, Science and Economic Development Canada
- Allan Hubley, incumbent city councillor
- Bina Shah, teacher

Results

2022 Ottawa municipal election: Kanata South
Candidate	Popular vote			Expenditures
Candidate	Votes	%	±%	Expenditures
Allan Hubley (X)	5,334	33.86	-11.67	$38,624.23
Erin Coffin	3,611	22.92	–	$24,157.11
Rouba Fattal	3,606	22.89	–	$19,471.95
Mike Dawson	1,782	11.31	–	$23,302.44
Bina Shah	1,422	9.03	–	$14,399.90
Total valid votes	15,755	99.14		
Total rejected, unmarked and declined votes	137	0.86		
Turnout	15,892	44.04	+2.62	
Eligible voters	36,085			
Note: Candidate campaign colours are based on the prominent colour used in campaign items (signs, literature, etc.) and are used as a visual differentiation between candidates.

==== Barrhaven East Ward ====
The Barrhaven East Ward was newly created for the 2022 election following redistricting. Incumbent city councillor Carol Anne Meehan initially announced she was running for re-election in the new Barrhaven East Ward, but later announced she was not running for re-election.

Nominated candidates

- Guy Boone
- Patrick Brennan, information security specialist
- Kathleen Caught, retired financial consultant
- Richard Garrick, teacher
- Dominik Janelle, Carleton University student
- Wilson Lo, city employee and former bus operator
- Atiq Qureshi

Results

2022 Ottawa municipal election: Barrhaven East
Candidate	Popular vote			Expenditures
Candidate	Votes	%	±%	Expenditures
Wilson Lo	4,403	36.82	–	$14,613.45
Richard Garrick	2,980	24.92	–	$18,650.37
Patrick Brennan	2,153	18.00	–	$9,965.30
Kathleen Caught	888	7.43	–	$10,058.14
Atiq Qureshi	778	6.51	–	$8,560.16
Guy Boone	516	4.32	–	$2,378.28
Dominik Janelle	240	2.01	–	$2,548.19
Total valid votes	11,958	97.66		
Total rejected, unmarked and declined votes	286	2.34		
Turnout	12,244	39.11		
Eligible voters	31,307			
Note: Candidate campaign colours are based on the prominent colour used in campaign items (signs, literature, etc.) and are used as a visual differentiation between candidates.

=== Endorsements ===
Extended content

Barrhaven West

Candidate	Endorsements
Taayo Simmonds	Peter MacKay (former federal cabinet minister, former leader of the Progressive Conservative Party of Canada and former MP for Central Nova)
Sadaf Ebrahim	Brian Storseth (former MP for Westlock—St. Paul); Joel Harden (MPP for Ottawa Centre)

West Carleton-March

Candidate	Endorsements
Stephanie Maghnam	Marianne Wilkinson (former city councillor for Kanata North Ward); Roly Armitage (former mayor of West Carleton Township)

Stittsville Ward

Candidate	Endorsements
Kevin Hua	Joel Harden (MPP for Ottawa Centre)

Bay Ward

Candidate	Endorsements
Theresa Kavanagh	Jeff Leiper (City councillor for Kitchissippi Ward); Rawlson King (City councillor for Rideau-Rockcliffe Ward); Chandra Pasma (MPP for Ottawa West—Nepean); Philip Toone (Former MP for Gaspésie—Îles-de-la-Madeleine); Marlene Catterall (Former MP for Ottawa West—Nepean)

College Ward

Candidate	Endorsements
Laine Johnson	Jeff Leiper (City councillor for Kitchissippi Ward); Shawn Menard (City councillor for Capital Ward); Theresa Kavanagh (City councillor for Bay Ward); Joel Harden (MPP for Ottawa Centre); Penny Collenette (Human rights lawyer and 2008 Liberal candidate for Ottawa Centre); Diane Deans (City councillor for Gloucester-Southgate Ward); Katie Gibbs (co-founder and executive director of Evidence For Democracy); Chandra Pasma (MPP for Ottawa West—Nepean); Molly McGoldrick-Larsen (former regional councillor); Marit Stiles (MPP for Davenport); David Chernushenko (former city councillor for Capital Ward)
Pat McGarry	Jim Durrell (former mayor); Jacquelin Holzman (former mayor); Mary Pitt (former Nepean mayor); Andy Haydon (former regional chair)
Vilteau Delvas	Campaign Life Coalition

Knoxdale-Merivale Ward

Candidate	Endorsements
James Dean	Andy Haydon (Former Regional Chair, former mayor of Nepean)
Sean Devine	Joel Harden (MPP for Ottawa Centre); Marit Stiles (MPP for Davenport); Chandra Pasma (MPP for Ottawa West—Nepean)
Joseph Ben-Ami	Campaign Life Coalition

Gloucester-Southgate Ward

Candidate	Endorsements
Jessica Bradley	Diane Deans (Outgoing city councillor for Gloucester-Southgate Ward)

Rideau-Vanier Ward

Candidate	Endorsements
Tyler Cybulski	Campaign Life Coalition
Stéphanie Plante	Marie-France Lalonde (MP for Orléans); Jacquelin Holzman (former mayor of Ottawa)
Laura Shantz	Shawn Menard (City councillor for Capital Ward); Joel Harden (MPP for Ottawa Centre); Alexandre Boulerice (MP for Rosemont—La Petite-Patrie); Diane Deans (City councillor for Gloucester-Southgate Ward); Theresa Kavanagh (City councillor for Bay Ward)

Rideau-Rockcliffe Ward

Candidate	Endorsements
Rawlson King	Bernadette Clement (Senator); Mathieu Fleury (city councillor for Rideau-Vanier Ward); Lyra Evans (OCDSB Trustee); Theresa Kavanagh (city councillor for Bay Ward)

Somerset Ward

Candidate	Endorsements
Ariel Troster	Catherine McKenney (Mayoral candidate & outgoing city councillor for Somerset Ward); Joel Harden (MPP for Ottawa Centre); Maude Barlow (activist and author); Diane Holmes (former city councillor for Somerset Ward)

Capital Ward

Candidate	Endorsements
Rebecca Bromwich	Sheila Copps (Former Deputy Prime Minister of Canada and MP for Hamilton East, former MPP for Hamilton Centre)
Shawn Menard	Joel Harden (MPP for Ottawa Centre); Evelyn Gigantes (Former MPP for Ottawa Centre and Carleton East; Former Ontario Minister of Health and Minister of Housing)

Orléans South—Navan Ward

Candidate	Endorsements
Yvette Ashiri	Bernadette Clement (Senator from Ontario, Former mayor of Cornwall)

Rideau-Jock Ward

Candidate	Endorsements
Michael J. Nowak	Campaign Life Coalition

Kanata South Ward

Candidate	Endorsements
Erin Coffin	Joel Harden (MPP for Ottawa Centre)

== School Board ==
=== Boards ===
==== Ottawa Catholic School Board ====
Extended content

==== Zone 1 ====
Incumbent trustee Mardi de Kemp was appointed to the seat on March 29, 2022, after her predecessor, John Curry, died on February 5, 2022. She will be seeking election to a full term.

Nominated candidates

- Jeff Darwin
- Mardi de Kemp, incumbent trustee
- Scott Phelan

OCSB Zone 1	Vote	%	±%
Scott Phelan	3,073	44.27	
Mardi de Kemp (X)	2,460	35.44	
Jeff Darwin	1,408	20.29	

==== Zone 2 ====
Incumbent trustee Sandra Moore was re-elected in 2018 with 69.53% of the vote. She will be seeking re-election.

Nominated candidates

- Sandra Moore, incumbent trustee
- Alex Sithole

OCSB Zone 2	Vote	%	±%
Sandra Moore (X)	4,932	77.95	+8.42
Alex Sithole	1,395	22.05	

==== Zone 3 ====
Incumbent trustee Brian Coburn was re-elected by acclamation in 2018. He will be seeking re-election.

Nominated candidates

- Brian Coburn, incumbent trustee
- Marguerite Gravelle
- Paul Safi

OCSB Zone 3	Vote	%	±%
Brian Coburn (X)	2,575	59.87	
Paul Safi	1,008	23.44	
Marguerite Gravelle	718	16.69	

==== Zone 4 ====
Incumbent trustee Spencer Warren was re-elected by acclamation in 2018. He will be seeking re-election.

Nominated candidates

- Nicolas Caravaggio
- Greg Hopkins
- Spencer Warren, incumbent trustee

OCSB Zone 4	Vote	%	±%
Spencer Warren (X)	3,370	48.49	
Greg Hopkins	1,997	28.73	
Nicolas Caravaggio	1,583	22.78	

==== Zone 5 ====
Incumbent trustee Joanne MacEwan was re-elected by acclamation in 2018. She will be seeking re-election.

Nominated candidates

- Marc Bélisle
- Joanne MacEwan, incumbent trustee

OCSB Zone 5	Vote	%	±%
Joanne MacEwan (X)	2,662	72.79	
Marc Bélisle	995	27.21	

==== Zone 6 ====
Incumbent trustee Glen Armstrong was elected in 2018 with 54.59% of the vote. He will be seeking re-election.

Nominated candidates

- Glen Armstrong, incumbent trustee
- Melissa Fraser-Arnott
- Eugene Milito, former principal of St. Nicholas Adult High School
- Patrick Suwalski

OCSB Zone 6	Vote	%	±%
Eugene Milito	1,932	35.71	
Melissa Fraser-Arnott	1,681	31.07	
Glen Armstrong (X)	1,458	26.95	-27.64
Patrick Suwalski	340	6.28	

==== Zone 7 ====
Incumbent trustee Jeremy Wittet was re-elected by acclamation in 2018. He will be seeking re-election.

Nominated candidates

- Danny Arrais
- Jeremy Wittett, incumbent trustee

OCSB Zone 7	Vote	%	±%
Jeremy Wittett (X)	1,859	68.12	
Danny Arrais	870	31.88	

==== Zone 8 ====
Incumbent trustee Mark D. Mullan was re-elected by acclamation in 2018. He will be seeking re-election.

Nominated candidates

- Mark Mullan, incumbent trustee
- Christopher Andrew John Kelly

OCSB Zone 8	Vote	%	±%
Mark Mullan (X)	2,389	67.52	
Christopher Andrew John Kelly	1,149	32.48	

==== Zone 9 ====
Incumbent trustee Shelley Lawrence was elected in 2018 with 82.92% of the vote. She will be seeking re-election.

Nominated candidates

- Guillermo Fernandez
- Shelley Lawrence, incumbent trustee
- Jenny Rivera

OCSB Zone 9	Vote	%	±%
Shelley Lawrence (X)	1,562	55.33	-27.59
Guillermo Fernandez	664	23.52	
Jenny Rivera	597	21.15	

==== Zone 10 ====
Incumbent trustee Cindy Simpson was appointed to the seat on February 12, 2019, after her predecessor, Thérèse Maloney-Cousineau, died on January 11, 2019. She will be seeking election to a full term.

Nominated candidates

- Cameron Bonesso, university student and president of Ottawa-based consulting firm Constituent Manager Solutions
- Cindy Desclouds-Simpson, appointed incumbent trustee

OCSB Zone 10	Vote	%	±%
Cindy Desclouds-Simpson (X)	1,296	59.67	+9.76
Cameron Bonesso	876	40.33	

==== Ottawa-Carleton District School Board ====
Extended content

In 2022, the OCDSB responded to the City of Ottawa's ward boundary realignment by redistricting its trustee Zones. Following consultation, trustees made amendments to their zones, specifically:

Ward	Zone in 2018	Zone in 2022
Barrhaven East	N/A	Zone 3
Knoxdale-Merivale	Zone 3	Zone 5
Kitchissippi	Zone 10	Zone 4
Rideau-Vanier	Zone 9	Zone 6
Alta Vista	Zone 6	Zone 9
Gloucester-Southgate	Zone 7	Zone 11

==== Zone 1 - West Carleton-March/Stittsville/Rideau-Jock ====
Incumbent trustee Lynn Scott was re-elected in 2018 with 64.84% of the vote. She will be seeking re-election.

Nominated candidates

- Jonathon Salinas, public servant
- Lynn Scott, incumbent trustee
- Gananatha Subrahmanyam, professor at the University of Ottawa

OCDSB Zone 1	Vote	%	±%
Lynn Scott (X)	13,703	63.03	-1.78
Jonathon Salinas	4,653	21,41	
Gananatha Subrahmanyam	3,374	15.53	

==== Zone 2 - Kanata North/Kanata South ====
Incumbent trustee Christine Boothby was re-elected in 2018 with 66.34% of the vote. She did not file to run for re-election.

Nominated candidates

- Alysha Aziz
- Ashley Darling
- Thomas DeGroot, Executive Assistant to Progressive Conservative MPP Merrilee Fullerton, former regional vice president for the Progressive Conservative Party of Ontario
- Michael Edwards
- Alastair Luft, writer
- Alex Rochman, quality assurance specialist

OCDSB Zone 2	Vote	%	±%
Alysha Aziz	5,822	32.58	
Ashley Darling	5,657	31.66	
Michael Edwards	3,787	21.19	
Thomas DeGroot	1,732	9.69	
Alex Rochman	628	3.51	
Alastair Luft	242	1.35	

==== Zone 3 - Barrhaven West/Barrhaven East ====
Incumbent trustee Donna Blackburn was re-elected in 2018 with 39.96% of the vote. She will be seeking re-election.

Nominated candidates

- Donna Blackburn, incumbent trustee
- Patricia Kmiec, human rights and social justice/sociology contract Professor at Carleton University
- Natalie Rowe

OCDSB Zone 3	Vote	%	±%
Donna Blackburn (X)	7,267	45.27	+5.31
Patricia Kmiec	5,160	32.14	+25.22
Natalie Rowe	3,627	22.59	

==== Zone 4 - Bay/Kitchissippi ====
Incumbent trustee Wendy Hough was elected in 2018 with 66.65% of the vote. She did not file to run for re-election.

Nominated candidates

- Rasha Alnaqeeb
- Suzanne Nash, president of the Plant Pool Recreation Association
- Kevin Wright

OCDSB Zone 4	Vote	%	±%
Suzanne Nash	14,264	67.12	
Kevin Wright	4,080	19.20	
Rasha Alnaqeeb	2,906	13.68	

==== Zone 5 - College/Knoxdale-Merivale ====
Incumbent trustee Rob Campbell was elected in 2018 with 65.08% of the vote. He did not file to run for re-election.

Nominated candidates

- Gemma Nicholson
- Amanda Presley
- Steven Warren, University of Ottawa student and provincial Green candidate in Ottawa West—Nepean in 2022

OCDSB Zone 5	Vote	%	±%
Amanda Presley	10,356	57.20	
Steven Warren	5,355	29.58	
Gemma Nicholson	2,395	13.23	

==== Zone 6 - Rideau-Vanier/Rideau-Rockcliffe ====
Incumbent trustee Chris Ellis was re-elected in 2018 with 48.28% of the vote. He did not file to run for re-election. The 2SLGBTQI+ community has criticized Shannon Boschy's candidacy due to his opposition to gender-affirming medical care for children and youth, which Boschy described as "the sterilization of vulnerable children in Canada."

Nominated candidates

- Shannon Boschy, Certified Financial Planner
- Keith de Silvia-Legault, University of Ottawa student, former political staffer and charity fundraiser
- Lyra Evans, incumbent trustee for Zone 9
- Anthony Hope, operations coordinator
- Jennifer Moroziuk
- Ryan Ward

OCDSB Zone 6	Vote	%	±%
Lyra Evans (X)	7,274	54.45	-0.88
Anthony Hope	1,324	9.91	
Shannon Boschy	1,224	9.16	
Keith de Silvia-Legault	1,199	8.98	
Ryan Ward	1,185	8.87	
Jennifer Moroziuk	1,153	8.63	

==== Zone 7 - Osgoode/Riverside South-Findlay Creek ====
Incumbent trustee Jennifer Jennekens was elected in 2018 with 52.74% of the vote. She will be seeking re-election.

Nominated candidates

- Jennifer Jennekens, incumbent trustee and federal Conservative candidate in Ottawa West—Nepean in 2021
- Maria Inam Khan

OCDSB Zone 7	Vote	%	±%
Jennifer Jennekens (X)	7,793	68.81	+16.07
Maria Inam Khan	3,532	31.19	

==== Zone 8 - Orléans East-Cumberland/Orléans South-Navan ====
Incumbent trustee Keith Penny was elected in 2018 with 55.13% of the vote. He did not file to run for re-election. The 2SLGBTQI+ community has criticized Chanel Pfahl's candidacy due to her opposition to gender-affirming medical care for children and youth, which she described as "a pseudoscientific concept which harms kids".

Nominated candidates

- Donna Dickson
- Shannon Kramer
- Chanel Pfahl

OCDSB Zone 8	Vote	%	±%
Donna Dickson	6,906	55.75	
Shannon Kramer	3,225	26.03	
Chanel Pfahl	2,257	18.22	

==== Zone 9 - Capital/Alta-Vista ====
Incumbent trustee Lyra Evans was elected in 2018 with 55.33% of the vote. She will be running for re-election in Zone 6.

Nominated candidates

- Nili Kaplan-Myrth, family doctor
- Josh Rachlis, copywriter and perennial candidate
- Jessie-Lee Wallace, communications professional and charity fundraiser

OCDSB Zone 9	Vote	%	±%
Nili Kaplan-Myrth	9,501	50.74	
Jessie-Lee Wallace	7,773	41.51	
Josh Rachlis	1,452	7.75	

==== Zone 10 - Somerset ====
Incumbent trustee Justine Bell was appointed to the seat on February 12, 2020, after her predecessor, Erica Braunovan, resigned on December 4, 2019. She will be seeking a full term.

Nominated candidates

- Justine Bell, incumbent trustee
- John Bitzan

OCDSB Zone 10	Vote	%	±%
Justine Bell (X)	9,626	89.13	
John Bitzan	1,174	10.87	

==== Zone 11 - River/Gloucester-Southgate ====
Incumbent trustee Mark Fisher was re-elected in 2018 with 50.42% of the vote. He did not file to run for re-election.

Nominated candidates

- Mamata Dutta
- Matthew Lee
- Ryan St-Jean
- Maher Jebara

OCDSB Zone 11	Vote	%	±%
Matthew Lee	4,948	31.99	
Maher Jebara	4,050	26.18	
Ryan St-Jean	3,440	22.24	
Mamata Dutta	3,030	19.59	

==== Zone 12 - Orléans West-Innes/Beacon-Hill Cyrville ====
Incumbent trustee Sandra Schwartz was re-elected in 2018 with 74.31% of the vote. She did not file to run for re-election.

Nominated candidates

- Sandra Griffith-Bonaparte, public servant, and president of Local 70607 of the Public Service Alliance of Canada
- Peter Heyck, 2018 candidate for City Council in Rideau-Rockcliffe Ward
- Cathryne Milburn

OCDSB Zone 12	Vote	%	±%
Cathryne Milburn	5,502	45.04	
Sandra Griffith-Bonaparte	3,879	31.76	
Peter Heyck	2,834	23.20	

==== Conseil des écoles catholiques du Centre-Est ====
Extended content

The Conseil des écoles catholiques du Centre-Est (CECCE)'s boundaries for Zones 1, 2, and 3 are outside of Ottawa, and are thus not included on this list.

==== Zone 4 ====
Incumbent trustee Jolène Savoie-Day was elected in 2018 with 66.80% of the vote. She will be seeking re-election.

Nominated candidates

- Jolène Savoie-Day, incumbent trustee

CECCE Zone 4	Vote	%	±%
Jolène Savoie-Day (X)	Acclaimed		

==== Zone 5 ====
Incumbent trustee Chad Mariage was re-elected by acclamation in 2018. He will be seeking re-election.

Nominated candidates

- Claude Lalonde
- Chad Mariage, incumbent trustee

CECCE Zone 5	Vote	%	±%
Claude Lalonde	1,694	62.83	
Chad Mariage (X)	1,002	37.17	

==== Zone 6 ====
Incumbent trustee Valérie Assoi was elected by acclamation in 2018. She did not file to run for re-election.

Nominated candidates

- Franklin Epape
- Denis Forget

CECCE Zone 6	Vote	%	±%
Denis Forget	2,129	82.30	
Franklin Epape	458	17.70	

==== Zone 7 ====
Incumbent trustee Robert Rainboth was elected by acclamation in 2018. He will be seeking re-election.

Nominated candidates

- Robert Rainboth, incumbent trustee

CECCE Zone 7	Vote	%	±%
Robert Rainboth (X)	Acclaimed		

==== Zone 8 ====
Incumbent trustee Dan Boudria was re-elected in 2018 with 79.15% of the vote. He will be seeking re-election.

Nominated candidates

- Dan Boudria, incumbent trustee

CECCE Zone 8	Vote	%	±%
Dan Boudria (X)	Acclaimed		

==== Zone 9 ====
Incumbent trustee Johanne Lacombe was re-elected by acclamation in 2018. She will be seeking re-election.

Nominated candidates

- Johanne Lacombe, incumbent trustee

CECCE Zone 9	Vote	%	±%
Johanne Lacombe (X)	Acclaimed		

==== Zone 10 ====
Incumbent trustee Monique Briand was re-elected by acclamation in 2018. She will be running for re-election.

Nominated candidates

- Léo Cardinal
- Monique Briand, incumbent trustee

CECCE Zone 10	Vote	%	±%
Monique Briand (X)	2,943	75.11	
Léo Cardinal	975	24.89	

==== Zone 11 ====
Incumbent trustee André Thibodeau was elected by acclamation in 2018. He will be seeking re-election.

Nominated candidates

- André Thibodeau, incumbent trustee

CECCE Zone 11	Vote	%	±%
André Thibodeau (X)	Acclaimed		

==== Conseil des écoles publiques de l'Est de l'Ontario ====
Extended content

The Conseil des écoles publiques de l'Est de l'Ontario (CEPEO)'s boundaries for Zones 1, 2, 3, 4, and 5 are outside of Ottawa, and are thus not included on this list.

==== Zone 6 ====
Incumbent trustee Roda Muse was elected by acclamation in 2018. She did not file to run for re-election.

Nominated candidates

- Marc Roy, incumbent trustee for Zone 8

CEPEO Zone 6	Vote	%	±%
Marc Roy	Acclaimed		

==== Zone 7 ====
Incumbent trustee Denis M. Chartrand was re-elected in 2018 with 73.79% of the vote. He did not file to run for re-election.

Nominated candidates

- Nenette Ntema-Mbudi
- Philippe Landry

CEPEO Zone 7	Vote	%	±%
Philippe Landry (X)	1,537	74.94	
Nenette Ntema-Mbudi	514	25.06	

==== Zone 8 ====
Incumbent trustee Marc Roy was re-elected by acclamation in 2018. He has indicated that he will be seeking re-election in Zone 6.

Nominated candidates

- Denis Labrèche, 2020 Cumberland Ward by-election candidate, President of the Carlsbad Springs Community Association and director of CJRO-FM
- Annila Tharakan

CEPEO Zone 8	Vote	%	±%
Denis Labrèche	688	64.72	
Annila Tharakan	375	35.28	

==== Zone 9 ====
Incumbent trustee Marielle Godbout was re-elected in 2018 with 79.34% of the vote. She will be seeking re-election.

Nominated candidates

- Joël Beddows
- Mahdi Djama Aouled
- Marielle Godbout, incumbent trustee

CEPEO Zone 9	Vote	%	±%
Joël Beddows	1,230	48.43	
Marielle Godbout (X)	960	37.80	-41.54
Mahdi Djama Aouled	350	13.78	

==== Zone 10 ====
Incumbent trustee Warsama Abdourahman Aden was appointed to the seat on September 23, 2020, after his predecessor, Lucille Collard, was elected as Member of Provincial Parliament for Ottawa—Vanier on February 27, 2020. He will be seeking election to a full term.

Nominated candidates

- Warsama Aden, incumbent trustee
- Joseph-Alphonse André
- Sonia Boudreault

CEPEO Zone 10	Vote	%	±%
Sonia Boudreault	2,284	76.62	
Warsama Aden (X)	375	12.58	
Joseph-Alphonse André	322	10.80	

==== Zone 11 ====
Incumbent trustee Jacinthe Marcil was elected in 2018 with 43.87% of the vote. She will be seeking re-election.

Nominated candidates

- Jacinthe Marcil, incumbent trustee

CEPEO Zone 11	Vote	%	±%
Jacinthe Marcil (X)	Acclaimed		

==== Zone 12 ====
Incumbent trustee Samia Ouled Ali was elected in 2018 with 50.99% of the vote. She will be seeking re-election.

Nominated candidates

- Samia Ouled Ali, incumbent trustee

CEPEO Zone 12	Vote	%	±%
Samia Ouled Ali (X)	Acclaimed		

=== Endorsements ===
Extended content

OCDSB Zone 2 - Kanata North/Kanata South

Candidate	Endorsements
Ashley Darling	Campaign Life Coalition
Alysha Aziz	Shawn Menard

OCDSB Zone 3 - Barrhaven West/Barrhaven East

Candidate	Endorsements
Patricia Kmiec	Shawn Menard

OCDSB Zone 4 - Bay/Kitchissippi

Candidate	Endorsements
Rasha Alnaqeeb	Campaign Life Coalition
Suzanne Nash	Catherine McKenney (Candidate for mayor and councillor for Somerset Ward)

OCDSB Zone 5 - College/Knoxdale-Merivale

Candidate	Endorsements
Steven Warren	Mike Schreiner (Leader of the Green Party of Ontario)

OCDSB Zone 6 - Rideau-Vanier/Rideau-Rockcliffe

Candidate	Endorsements
Shannon Boschy	Campaign Life Coalition
Lyra Evans	Catherine McKenney (Candidate for mayor and councillor for Somerset Ward); Rawlson King (Councillor for Rideau-Rockcliffe Ward)

OCDSB Zone 9 - Capital/Alta-Vista

Candidate	Endorsements
Nili Kaplan-Myrth	Catherine McKenney (Candidate for mayor and councillor for Somerset Ward); Cheri DiNovo (Former MPP for Parkdale—High Park); Lyra Evans (Incumbent OCDSB Trustee for Zone 9 - Capital/Alta-Vista)

OCDSB Zone 10 - Somerset

Candidate	Endorsements
Justine Bell	Catherine McKenney (Candidate for mayor and councillor for Somerset Ward); Ariel Troster (Candidate for city councillor in Somerset Ward)

OCDSB Zone 11 - River/Gloucester-Southgate

Candidate	Endorsements
Matthew Lee	Campaign Life Coalition

== Third-party advertisers ==
=== Campaign Life Coalition ===
The Campaign Life Coalition is a Canadian political lobbyist organization that advocates for socially conservative values. Campaign Life Coalition opposes abortion, euthanasia, embryonic stem cell research, IVF, same-sex marriage, and transgender rights legislation.

Date registered: Sept 9, 2022
Organization website: https://www.campaignlifecoalition.com/
Mayoral Endorsements: Mike Maguire, Ade Olumide, and Bernard Couchman
City Council Endorsements:

College Ward - Vilteau Delvas
Knoxdale-Merivale Ward - Joseph Ben-Ami
Rideau-Vanier Ward - Tyler Cybulski
Rideau-Jock Ward - Michael J. Nowak

OCDSB Trustee Endorsements:

Zone 2 - Kanata North/Kanata South - Ashley Darling
Zone 4 - Bay/Kitchissippi - Rasha Alnaqeeb
Zone 6 - Rideau-Vanier/Rideau-Rockcliffe - Shannon Boschy
Zone 11 - River/Gloucester-Southgate - Matthew Lee & Maher Jebara

=== Horizon Ottawa ===
Horizon Ottawa is a progressive community organization that advocates for progressive policies and more progressive elected representatives.

Date registered: August 24, 2022
Mayoral Endorsement: Catherine McKenney
City Council Endorsements:

Orléans East-Cumberland Ward - Tessa Franklin
Orléans West-Innes Ward - Lori Stinson
Stittsville Ward - Kevin Hua
College Ward - Laine Johnson
Knoxdale-Merivale Ward - Sean Devine
Rideau-Vanier Ward - Laura Shantz
Somerset Ward - Ariel Troster
Kitchissippi Ward - Jeff Leiper
River Ward - Ethan Sabourin
Capital Ward - Shawn Menard
Orléans South-Navan Ward - Yvette Ashiri

OCDSB Trustee Endorsements:

Zone 2 - Kanata North/Kanata South - Alysha Aziz
Zone 3 - Barrhaven West/Barrhaven East - Patricia Kmiec
Zone 4 - Bay/Kitchissippi - Suzanne Nash
Zone 5 - College/Knoxdale-Merivale - Steven Warren
Zone 6 - Rideau-Vanier/Rideau-Rockcliffe - Lyra Evans
Zone 9 - Capital/Alta Vista - Jessie-Lee Wallace & Nili Kaplan-Myrth
Zone 10 - Somerset - Justine Bell
