= Joseph Ben-Ami =

Canadian conservative writer, strategist and organizer

Joseph C. Ben-Ami (born 1962/1963) is a Canadian conservative writer, strategist and organizer. He is a principal consultant with Ditchley Public Affairs, a Canadian-based strategic communications and political marketing firm, and sits on the board of BlueCommittee.Org. Ben-Ami is the former president and CEO of the Arthur Meighen Institute for Public Affairs (formerly the Canadian Centre for Policy Studies), an independent conservative think-tank, and publisher of Canadian Observer, a quarterly magazine that examines culture, politics and public affairs from a conservative perspective. Before joining the Meighen Institute he was the executive director of the Institute for Canadian Values (ICV), and before that he was director of Government Relations and Diplomatic Affairs for B'nai B'rith Canada. Ben-Ami is also a member of the international advisory board of the organization Jews Against Anti-Christian Defamation, a US-based Jewish group dedicated to fighting discrimination directed against Christians.

Ben-Ami has held senior positions in several local, provincial and national political and advocacy campaigns. He served as a policy aid to former Canadian Prime Minister Stephen Harper and operations director for Stockwell Day, former leader of the Canadian Alliance. Most recently he managed the campaign of Brad Trost for the leadership of the Conservative Party of Canada.

Ben-Ami is also a conservative television and radio commentator and regular public speaker. He is co-host of The Combat Zone Podcast and lectures on subjects such as civic engagement and leadership.

In 2022, Ben-Ami unsuccessfully ran for Ottawa City Council in Knoxdale-Merivale Ward. He placed fourth behind playwright Sean Devine; real-estate agent James Dean; and brother of outgoing councillor Keith Egli, Myles Egli. Ben-Ami's campaign emphasized fiscal austerity. Ben-Ami also made statements in support of reducing the number of city councillors, and supported Ontario Premier Doug Ford's move to give mayors of large cities executive powers. While his campaign was ultimately unsuccessful, Ben-Ami's support was strongest in western portions of the ward, where he placed second to Sean Devine in two polling stations: Knoxdale Public School and Sir Robert Borden High School.

== Electoral record ==
2022 Ottawa municipal election: Knoxdale-Merivale Ward
Candidate	Popular vote			Expenditures
Candidate	Votes	%	±%	Expenditures
Sean Devine	4,812	39.20	–	
James Dean	2,564	20.89	+1.05	
Myles Egli	2,051	16.71	–	
Joseph Ben-Ami	1,426	11.62	–	
Michael Wood	1,228	10.00	–	
Peter Westaway	118	0.96	–	
Peter Anthony Weber	77	0.63	-1.99	
Total valid votes	12,276	97.47		
Total rejected, unmarked and declined votes	318	2.53		
Turnout	12,594	45.55		
Eligible voters	27,650			
Note: Candidate campaign colours are based on the prominent colour used in campaign items (signs, literature, etc.) and are used as a visual differentiation between candidates.
