= Sean Devine (playwright) =

Canadian politician (born 1970)

Ottawa City Councillor
- Incumbent
- Assumed office November 15, 2022
- Preceded by: Keith Egli
- Constituency: Knoxdale-Merivale Ward

Personal details
- Born: June 11, 1970 (age 56) Montreal, Quebec, Canada
- Party: Independent
- Other political affiliations: New Democratic Party
- Spouse: Alexa Devine
- Children: 4
- Education: National Theatre School of Canada; Marianopolis College
- Occupation: Playwright, actor, politician

Sean Devine (born June 11, 1970) is a Canadian politician, playwright, and actor. Devine currently represents Knoxdale-Merivale Ward on Ottawa City Council. His artistic career has spanned over three decades, including playwriting and directing, as well as acting roles on film and television. He has appeared in over twenty films and more than a dozen TV series.

== Early life and education ==
Devine was born on June 11, 1970, in Montreal, Quebec. From 1987 to 1989 he attended Marianopolis College in Westmount. Afterwards, Devine studied from 1989 to 1992 at the National Theatre School of Canada.

== Drama career ==
Devine served as the artistic director of Horseshoes and Handgrenades Theatre Company between 2004 and 2019.

Devine's 2011 play Re:Union was based on the real-life story of Norman Morrison, a Baltimore Quaker who self-immolated below Secretary of Defense Robert McNamara's Pentagon office in 1965. The play imagines a meeting between Morrison's daughter Emily and Robert McNamara. First produced in 2011, it was published by Scirocco Drama in 2013. At Ottawa's Magnetic North Theatre Festival in 2015, Re:Union won the Prix Rideau Award for Ottawa's Best Production.

Devine's next play, Except in the Unlikely Event of War, premiered in 2013, was a political drama and satire which discusses war and government manipulation of the media. It draws inspiration from The Report from Iron Mountain, a satirical book which asserted that the United States government believed war was necessary to maintain its power.

Devine's 2016 play Daisy is a political drama set during the 1964 United States presidential election. The play depicts the events surrounding the presidential election and the controversial 'Daisy' advertisement of Lyndon B. Johnson's campaign. Daisy premiered at Seattle's ACT Theatre in 2016. The play received the Broadway World Seattle Critic's Choice Award for Best New Play and was nominated for a Gregory Award for Best New Play. It was later published as a book by Talonbooks in 2017.

Devine's play, titled When There's Nothing Left to Burn was released in 2017. The play was by the events of the 2014 Revolution of Dignity in Ukraine, and drew further inspiration from the 2012 Quebec student protests. It depicts ordinary citizens living in the midst of violent political upheaval. The play won the University of Lethbridge's Fiction at Fifty competition.

In 2017, Devine took a position with the Canada Council for the Arts, a federal government institution dedicated to funding the arts.

== Politics ==
In 2015, Devine won the nomination for the New Democratic Party over PIPSC negotiator Denise Doherty-Delorme to represent the party in the 2015 Canadian federal election in Nepean. Ultimately he placed third, losing to Chandra Arya of the Liberal Party. Devine was again the NDP's candidate in Nepean in the 2021 Canadian federal election and focused on establishing relationships with communities who felt ignored by Arya such as the Tamil, Punjabi and Sikh members. On this occasion he again placed third, although he received twice the number of votes he had in 2015.

Devine was successfully elected as city councillor for Knoxdale-Merivale Ward in the 2022 Ottawa municipal election, defeating real-estate agent James Dean, Myles Egli (brother of retiring incumbent Keith Egli), and conservative writer Joseph Ben-Ami. Devine's campaign emphasized the need for civility at city hall, improved public transit, and better natural disaster preparedness.

Devine voted against "Lansdowne 2.0" project which proposed over $400 million of taxpayer-funded subsidies for the redevelopment of Lansdowne Park. The project was approved by a vote of 16 to 9.

In 2024, Devine voted against reductions in the frequency of the O-Train. The service reductions were ultimately approved by city council.

== Personal life ==
Devine resides in the Trend-Arlington neighbourhood of Ottawa with his wife and four children. He previously served as the president of the Trend-Arlington Community Association. During his presidency, Trend-Arlington was severely affected by a tornado in 2018. Under Devine's leadership, the Community Association organized recovery efforts and received awards from the mayor's office and United Way for their work.

== Selected filmography ==
=== Television series ===
Year	Title	Role
2017	The Disappearance	Stephen Price
2014	Intruders	Bill Anderson
2013	The Haunting Hour: The Series	Mr. Franklin
2013	The Killing	Dr. Andrew Newman
2012	Arctic Air	Rudy
2008	Supernatural	Gus
2007	Dragon Boys	Motel Manager
2006	Whistler	Mack
2006	Godiva's	Ben
2006	Masters of Horror	Hunter
2005–2007	The 4400	P.J.
2004	Cold Squad	Dr. Alvin Whitehead
2003	Da Vinci's Inquest	Michael
2002	Galidor: Defenders of the Outer Dimension	Bala & Dr. Darger
2001	Mysterious Ways	Scott Krotenko
1998	The Mystery Files of Shelby Woo	Rawls
1997–1998	Lassie	Officer Burdick

=== Film ===
Year	Title	Role
2013	Midnight Stallion	Donald Dupree
2011	Knockout	Jacob Miller
2010	Territories	Walter Sotos
2009	Kick Me Down	Gene
2001	XChange	Rix
2000	The Whole Nine Yards	Sgt. Buchanan
1999	Dead Silent	Dakins
1999	The Last Breath	Hammer
1999	Perpetrators of the Crime	Ed
1999	Quand je serai parti... vous vivrez encore	Major Denny

=== Television films ===
Year	Title	Role
2018	Mommy's Little Angel	Doyle
2017	Killer Mom	Detective Peters
2003	Wicked Minds	Julien
2002	The Rendering	Kip
2001	The Royal Scandal	Timothy Carter
2001	Heart: The Marilyn Bell Story	Hindmarsh
2000	Race Against Time	Kilroy the Bounty Hunter
2000	Task Force	Pierre Bluteau
1999	Revenge of the Land	James McCann

== Electoral record ==
2022 Ottawa municipal election: Knoxdale-Merivale Ward
Candidate	Popular vote			Expenditures
Candidate	Votes	%	±%	Expenditures
Sean Devine	4,812	39.20	–	
James Dean	2,564	20.89	+1.05	
Myles Egli	2,051	16.71	–	
Joseph Ben-Ami	1,426	11.62	–	
Michael Wood	1,228	10.00	–	
Peter Westaway	118	0.96	–	
Peter Anthony Weber	77	0.63	-1.99	
Total valid votes	12,276	97.47		
Total rejected, unmarked and declined votes	318	2.53		
Turnout	12,594	45.55		
Eligible voters	27,650			
Note: Candidate campaign colours are based on the prominent colour used in campaign items (signs, literature, etc.) and are used as a visual differentiation between candidates.

2021 Canadian federal election: Nepean
Party	Candidate	Votes	%	±%	Expenditures
Liberal	Chandra Arya	29,620	45.1	-0.8	$109,271.27
Conservative	Matt Triemstra	22,184	33.7	+0.2	$75,325.90
New Democratic	Sean Devine	10,786	16.4	+3.3	$12,498.65
People's	Jay Nera	1,840	2.8	+1.8	$0.00
Green	Gordon Kubanek	1,318	2.0	-4.3	$786.11
Total valid votes/expense limit		65,748	–	–	$121,196.92
Total rejected ballots		419			
Turnout		66,167	70.85		
Eligible voters		93,391			
Source: Elections Canada

2015 Canadian federal election: Nepean
Party	Candidate	Votes	%	±%	Expenditures
Liberal	Chandra Arya	34,017	52.42	+25.32	$180,234.39
Conservative	Andy Wang	23,442	36.13	-14.89	$160,893.69
New Democratic	Sean Devine	5,324	8.20	-9.62	$23,472.19
Green	Jean-Luc Roger Cooke	1,513	2.33	-1.70	$14,291.13
Independent	Jesus Cosico	416	0.64	–	–
Independent	Hubert Mamba	69	0.11	–	$1,309.19
Independent	Harry Splett	66	0.10	–	–
Marxist–Leninist	Tony Seed	41	0.06	–	–
Total valid votes/Expense limit		64,888	100.00		$219,121.45
Total rejected ballots		262	0.40	–	
Turnout		65,150	78.52	–	
Eligible voters		82,976			
Liberal notional gain from Conservative		Swing		+20.10	
Source: Elections Canada
