= NSRA =

NSRA may refer to:

- National Smallbore Rifle Association, the national UK association for smallbore rifles
- National Street Rod Association, an association of Street Rod shows in the United States
- Non-Smokers' Rights Association, a Canadian non-profit organization
- Ruth L. Kirschstein National Research Service Award, a family of US NIH grants for training researchers
