= Knoxdale-Merivale Ward =

Knoxdale-Merivale
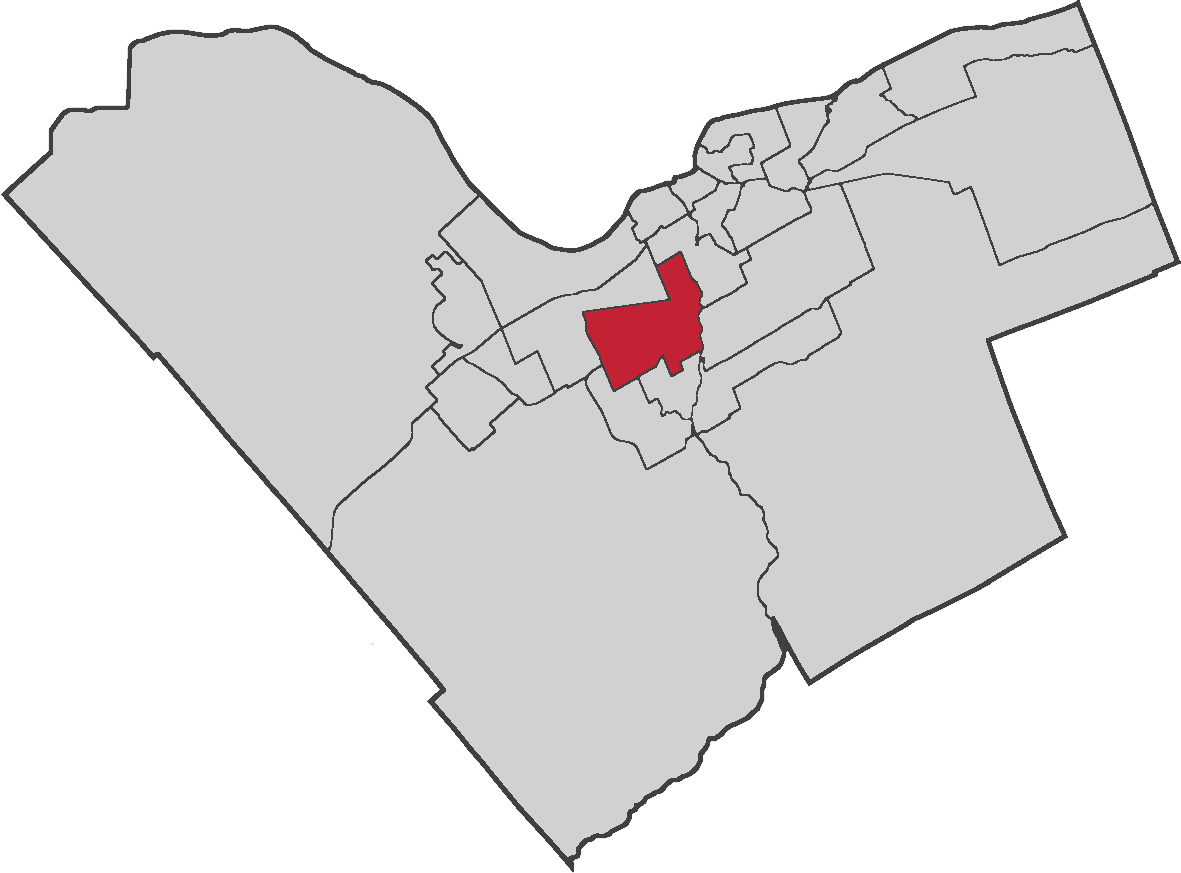
- Location within Ottawa
- Coordinates: 45°19′N 75°44′W
- Country: Canada
- Province: Ontario
- City: Ottawa

Government
  - Councillor: Sean Devine

Area
  - Total: 47.5 km^{2} (18.3 sq mi)

Population (2016)Canada 2016 Census
  - Total: 38,000
  - Density: 800/km^{2} (2,100/sq mi)

Languages (2016)
  - English: 68.2%
  - French: 7.4%
  - Arabic: 4.5%
  - Italian: 3.4%
  - Mandarin: 1.7%
  - Spanish: 1.4%
  - Cantonese: 1.2%
  - Tagalog: 1.1%
- Avg. income: $39,696

Knoxdale-Merivale (Ward 9) is a city ward in Ottawa, Ontario. Located in the city's west end, the ward is bordered to the east by the Rideau River and Fisher Avenue, the northern boundaries of the community of Barrhaven to the south, Ontario Highway 416 and Cedarview Road to the west and to the north by the Canadian National railway west of Merivale Road and Baseline Road to its east. It includes the communities of portions or all of Arlington Woods, Craig Henry, Tanglewood, Manordale, Crestview, Skyview, Parkwood Hills, Merivale Gardens, Grenfell Glen, Pineglen and Country Place.

== Regional and city councillors ==
Prior to 1994, Nepean elected its regional councillors on an at large basis.

1. Gord Hunter (1994–2010)
2. Keith Egli (2010–2022)
3. Sean Devine (2022–present)

== Election results ==
=== 2026 Ottawa municipal election ===
2026 Ottawa municipal election: Knoxdale-Merivale
Candidate	Popular vote			Expenditures
Candidate	Votes	%	±%	Expenditures
Sean Devine (X)	7,083	59.19		
Anna Ielo-Tal	3,540	29.58		
Cole Fraser Jones	1,224	10.23		
Brandon Ly (withdrawn)	120	1.00		
Total valid votes	12,223			
Total rejected, unmarked and declined votes				
Turnout		39.61		
Eligible voters	30,861			
Note: Candidate campaign colours are based on the prominent colour used in campaign items (signs, literature, etc.) and are used as a visual differentiation between candidates.

=== 2022 Ottawa municipal election ===
2022 Ottawa municipal election: Knoxdale-Merivale Ward
Candidate	Vote			Expenditures
Candidate	Votes	%	±%	Expenditures
Sean Devine	4,812	39.20	–	$28,355.68
James Dean	2,564	20.89	+1.05	N/A
Myles Egli	2,051	16.71	–	$8,246.44
Joseph Ben-Ami	1,426	11.62	–	N/A
Michael Wood	1,228	10.00	–	$8,980.62
Peter Westaway	118	0.96	–	$1,422.74
Peter Anthony Weber	77	0.63	-1.99	$1,306.54
Total valid votes	12,276	97.47		
Total rejected, unmarked and declined votes	318	2.53		
Turnout	12,594	45.55	+5.52	
Eligible voters	27,650			
Note: Candidate campaign colours are based on the prominent colour used in campaign items (signs, literature, etc.) and are used as a visual differentiation between candidates.

=== 2018 Ottawa municipal election ===
City council
Candidate	Vote	%
Keith Egli	6,369	63.12
James Dean	2,002	19.84
Luigi Mangone	1,114	11.04
Warren Arshinoff	342	3.39
Peter Anthony Weber	264	2.62

=== 2014 Ottawa municipal election ===
City council
Candidate	Vote	%
Keith Egli (X)	7,128	73.22
Cristian Lambiri	2,607	26.78

Ottawa mayor (Ward results)
Candidate	Vote	%
Jim Watson	6,946	73.56
Mike Maguire	2,121	22.46
Anwar Syed	91	0.96
Rebecca Pyrah	86	0.91
Robert White	66	0.70
Darren W. Wood	61	0.65
Bernard Couchman	47	0.50
Michael St. Arnaud	25	0.26

=== 2010 Ottawa municipal election ===
City council
Candidate	Votes	%
Keith Egli	3954	32.70
James O'Grady	2335	19.31
Rod Vanier	2115	17.49
James Dean	1907	15.77
Al Speyers	579	4.79
Paul Obeda	485	4.01
Mike Kennedy	268	2.22
Jules Ruhinda	213	1.76
Fred Ennis	121	1.00
Syed Asghar Hussain	116	0.96

=== 2006 Ottawa municipal election ===
City council
Candidate	Votes	%
Gord Hunter	10461	78.13
James Dean	2929	21.87

=== 2003 Ottawa municipal election ===
City council
Candidate	Votes	%
Gord Hunter	7029	84.79
Philip Unhola	637	7.68
Al Speyers	624	7.53

=== 2000 Ottawa municipal election ===
City council
Candidate	Votes	%
Gord Hunter	7845	71.27
Al Speyers	3163	28.73

=== 1997 Ottawa-Carleton Regional Municipality elections ===
Regional council
Candidate	Votes	%
Gord Hunter	Acclaimed	

=== 1994 Ottawa-Carleton Regional Municipality elections ===
Regional council
Candidate	Votes	%
Gord Hunter	5261	58.27
Richard Stead	3767	41.73
