= Shawn Menard =

Canadian politician

Ottawa City Councillor
- Incumbent
- Assumed office December 1, 2018
- Preceded by: David Chernushenko
- Constituency: Capital Ward

Ottawa-Carleton District School Board Trustee
- In office December 1, 2014 – December 1, 2018
- Preceded by: Rob Campbell
- Succeeded by: Lyra Evans
- Constituency: Zone 9

Personal details
- Born: April 14, 1982 (age 44) Ottawa
- Spouse: Johanna Hove
- Children: 2
- Education: Carleton University

Shawn Michael Menard (born April 14, 1982) is a Canadian politician. He was elected to Ottawa City Council representing Capital Ward in the 2018 Ottawa municipal election.

Menard grew up in Ottawa, the son of a single mother. He graduated from Sir Robert Borden High School, and studied criminology and public administration at Carleton University. At Carleton, Menard was the president of the Rideau River Residence Association and later the president of the Carleton University Students' Association. He graduated from Carleton with a master's degree in Public Policy and Administration.

After university, Menard worked as a strategic analyst for the Department of Justice and then as manager of government relations for the Federation of Canadian Municipalities. He was also involved in neighbourhood politics, serving as president of the Centretown Citizens Community Association, and established an umbrella group of community associations called "Our Ottawa".

Menard was elected as a public school trustee for the Ottawa-Carleton District School Board in the 2014 municipal elections with no opposition. He represented Zone 9, which covers both Capital and Rideau-Vanier Wards.

Menard had planned on running for re-election as a school trustee for the 2018 election, but entered the race for city council when fellow progressive Emilie Taman opted to not run. Many had also wanted Menard to run for mayor.

Menard ran on a progressive platform of reducing fares for public transportation, barring planning committee members from taking developer donations, and eliminating single use plastics. Often a critic of mayor Jim Watson, Menard endorsed Watson's rival Clive Doucet in the 2018 mayoral race. Menard was elected winning 28% of the vote, defeating his nearest rival Christine McAllister by fewer than 400 votes and incumbent David Chernushenko by just under 600 votes. Menard claimed the win as a "referendum on development" in the area, while Chernushenko blamed his defeat on being out-organized by an "NDP campaign".

Menard ran for a second term on Ottawa City Council in the 2022 Ottawa Municipal Election. He was endorsed by mayoral candidate and previous Somerset Ward councillor Catherine McKenney. Menard was re-elected with 11,358 votes.

In 2026, Menard endorsed Avi Lewis in that year's federal NDP leadership race.

== Election results ==
=== 2022 Ottawa City Council election – Capital Ward ===
2022 Ottawa City Council election: Capital Ward
Candidate	Popular vote			Expenditures
Candidate	Votes	%	±%	Expenditures
Shawn Menard (X)	11,358	78.81	+50.69	$35,177.03
Rebecca Bromwich	1,986	13.78	–	$16,704.75
Daniel Rogers	1,068	7.41	–	$5,439.96
Total valid votes	14,412	97.48		
Total rejected, unmarked and declined votes	372	2.52		
Turnout	14,784	51.27	-0.86	
Eligible voters	28,834			
Note: Candidate campaign colours are based on the prominent colour used in campaign items (signs, literature, etc.) and are used as a visual differentiation between candidates.

=== 2018 Ottawa City Council election – Capital Ward ===
Capital Ward (Ward 17)	Vote	%
Shawn Menard	3,575	28.12
Christine McAllister	3,198	25.15
David Chernushenko (X)	2,970	23.36
Anthony Carricato	2,451	19.28
Jide Afolabi	520	4.09

=== 2014 Ottawa municipal election ===
Ottawa-Carleton District School Board (Zone 9)
Candidate	Votes	%
Shawn Menard	Acclaimed	
