= Zed Chebib =

Canadian hunger striker, born 1955

- Born: Ziad Khoder Chebib; 1955 (age 70–71); Lebanon
- Citizenship: Canadian
- Political party: Independent

Zed Chebib (Born Ziad Khoder Chebib, 1955) is a Lebanese-born Canadian limousine driver and police reform advocate who is most known for being deported from Australia despite having resided in the country with his family for over a decade. He was a candidate in the 2022 Ottawa mayoral election and again in 2026, finishing last place both times.

== Biography ==
Born in Lebanon, Chebib emigrated to Canada in 1976. He resided in Calgary where he operated a limousine business named Limocab and became a naturalized citizen. While working as a cab driver, Chebib often sued various taxi companies.

He emigrated to Australia alongside his wife and four children in 1999 due to two of his siblings already living there. According to Chebib, 85 members of his extended family live in Australia. He attempted to seek permanent residency in Australia but was rejected because he was unable to meet income requirements of a business visa.

In 2006, immigration authorities informed Chebib that his initial visa had expired, however, he was granted a temporary reprieve from the Australian government. He tried to appeal to Canadian diplomats, but was rejected. While being detained at Maribyrnong Immigration Detention Centre in 2010 he began a hunger-strike in hopes the Australian government would grant him a visa. Chebib was flown to Vancouver and then Toronto, after ending his hunger strike he claimed to suffer heart palpitations and was denied an ambulance.

On returning to Canada, Chebib protested outside of the Australian Embassy where Ottawa Police allegedly attacked and arrested him. He filed a lawsuit against the officers, claiming that they had breached his civil rights and seeking nearly 2 million Canadian dollars in damages. After nearly nine years of trial, a judge ordered him to pay each officer $1,000 due to evidence that the arrest did not cause his injuries.

== Political campaigns ==
=== 1988 Calgary City Council by-election ===
Chebib first ran for political office in September 1988, entering a by-election for the fifth ward of the Calgary City Council. The fifth ward had a large middle eastern and Indian community at the time. Chebib's campaign was oriented toward building a new high school and reforming the city transit system. He finished third out of four candidates.

1988 Calgary 5th Ward by-election
Party	Candidate	Votes	%
Nonpartisan	Yvonne Pritz	3,327	53.71%
Nonpartisan	Shannon Pitts	2,648	42.75%
Nonpartisan	Ziad Chebib	127	2.05%
Nonpartisan	John E. Mason	92	1.49%
Total votes		6,194	100%

=== 2022 Ottawa mayoral election ===
He ran for Mayor of Ottawa in the 2022 Ottawa mayoral election, campaigning on police and housing reform. Not having a campaign website, he sent a website describing solutions to homelessness to media. He finished in last place with 0.08% or 264 votes.

2022 Ottawa municipal election: Mayor
Candidate	Popular vote			Expenditures
Candidate	Votes	%	±%	Expenditures
Mark Sutcliffe	161,679	51.37	–	$537,834.79
Catherine McKenney	119,241	37.88	–	$542,847.97
Bob Chiarelli	15,998	5.08	–	$96,844.84
Nour Kadri	7,496	2.38	–	$71,062.45
Mike Maguire	2,775	0.88	–	$5,500.00
Graham MacDonald	1,629	0.52	–	$5,334.50
Brandon Bay	1,512	0.48	–	$9,478.02
Param Singh	1,176	0.37	–	$13,650.40
Celine Debassige	867	0.28	–	none listed
Ade Olumide	636	0.20	–	$1,966.25
Gregory Jreg Guevara	584	0.19	–	$2,349.61
Bernard Couchman	471	0.15	-0.21	none listed
Jacob Solomon	432	0.14	–	none listed
Zed Chebib	264	0.08	–	none listed
Total valid votes	314,760	99.53		
Total rejected, unmarked and declined votes	1,500	0.47	-0.92	
Turnout	316,260	43.79	+1.24	
Eligible voters	722,227			
Note: Candidate campaign colours are based on the prominent colour used in campaign items (signs, literature, etc.) and are used as a visual differentiation between candidates.
Sources: City of Ottawa

=== 2025 federal election ===
Chebib was an independent candidate for the riding of Ottawa Centre in the 2025 Canadian federal election.

2025 Canadian federal election: Ottawa Centre
Party	Candidate	Votes	%	±%	Expenditures
Liberal	Yasir Naqvi	51,026	62.73	+17.50	$145,082.19
New Democratic	Joel Harden	15,935	19.59	–13.12	$140,977.79
Conservative	Paul D'Orsonnens	12,692	15.60	–0.68	$80,223.66
Green	Amanda Rosenstock	916	1.13	–1.67	$13,758.70
Canadian Future	Andrea Chabot	268	0.33	N/A	$17,715.43
Christian Heritage	Marie-Chantal Leriche	234	0.29	N/A	$0.00
Communist	Cashton Perry	154	0.19	–0.09	$0.00
Independent	Mike Salmon	66	0.08	N/A	$0.00
Independent	Zed Chebib	47	0.06	N/A	none listed
Total valid votes		81,338	99.26	–0.05	$149,828.93
Total rejected ballots		604	0.74	+0.05	
Turnout		81,942	77.43	+2.99	
Eligible voters		105,823			
Liberal notional hold		Swing		+15.31	
Source: Elections Canada
