= Keith Egli =

Canadian politician (born 1962)

Ottawa City Councillor
- In office December 1, 2010 – November 15, 2022
- Preceded by: Gord Hunter
- Succeeded by: Sean Devine
- Constituency: Knoxdale-Merivale Ward

Personal details
- Born: January 20, 1962 (age 64) Montreal, Quebec, Canada
- Spouse: Kristen Douglas (m. 1989)
- Children: 3
- Education: University of Ottawa

Keith Egli (born January 20, 1962) was the Ottawa city councillor for Knoxdale-Merivale Ward from 2010 to 2022. He won the ward in the 2010 Ottawa municipal election, which was vacated by the retiring Gord Hunter.

== Background ==
Egli was born in Montreal and moved to Ottawa as a teenager. He graduated from St. Pius X High School in Ottawa. He received a BA in Sociology and a law degree from the University of Ottawa. Prior to his election, he was a lawyer and mediator in Ottawa for twenty years. He is also a labour relations specialist.

== Politics ==
Egli was first elected in 2010. His first election featured a crowded field of nine candidates, including Green Party activist James O'Grady and former Ontario Liberal candidate Rod Vanier. Egli was re-elected by a large margin in 2014. Egli was re-elected for the final time in 2018, beating his closest opponent, real-estate agent James Dean by over 4,000 votes. Egli endorsed Jim Watson for mayor in the 2018 Ottawa municipal election.

Egli announced he would not seek re-election in the 2022 Ottawa municipal election on April 20, 2022. Keith Egli's brother, Myles Egli ran as a candidate in the 2022 election to succeed Keith, but placed third, losing to Sean Devine.

== Electoral record ==
2018 Ottawa City Council election: Knoxdale-Merivale Ward
Candidate	Vote	%
Keith Egli (X)	6,369	63.12
James Dean	2,002	19.84
Luigi Mangone	1,114	11.04
Warren Arshinoff	342	3.39
Peter Anthony Weber	264	2.62

2014 Ottawa City Council election: Knoxdale-Merivale Ward
Council candidate	Vote	%
Keith Egli (X)	7,128	73.22
Cristian Lambiri	2,607	26.78

2010 Ottawa City Council election: Knoxdale-Merivale Ward
Candidate	Votes	%
Keith Egli	3,954	32.70
James O'Grady	2,335	19.31
Rod Vanier	2,115	17.49
James Dean	1,907	15.77
Al Speyers	579	4.79
Paul Obeda	485	4.01
Mike Kennedy	268	2.22
Jules Ruhinda	213	1.76
Fred Ennis	121	1.00
Syed Asghar Hussain	116	0.96
