= Bilingualism in Ottawa =

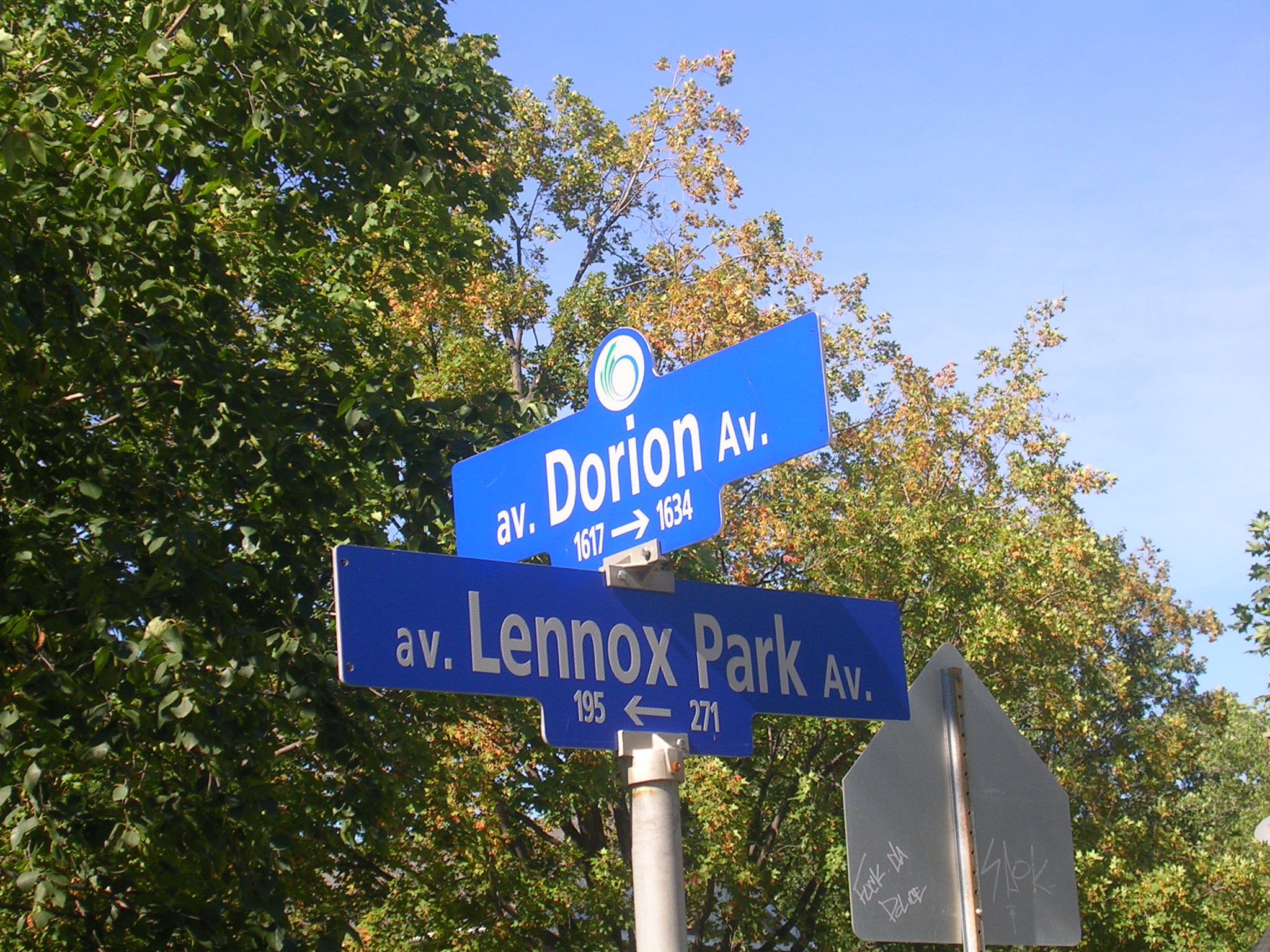
Street signs in Ottawa are bilingual, like the ones shown here.

Ottawa offers municipal services in English and French. It has been officially bilingual in law since 2017.

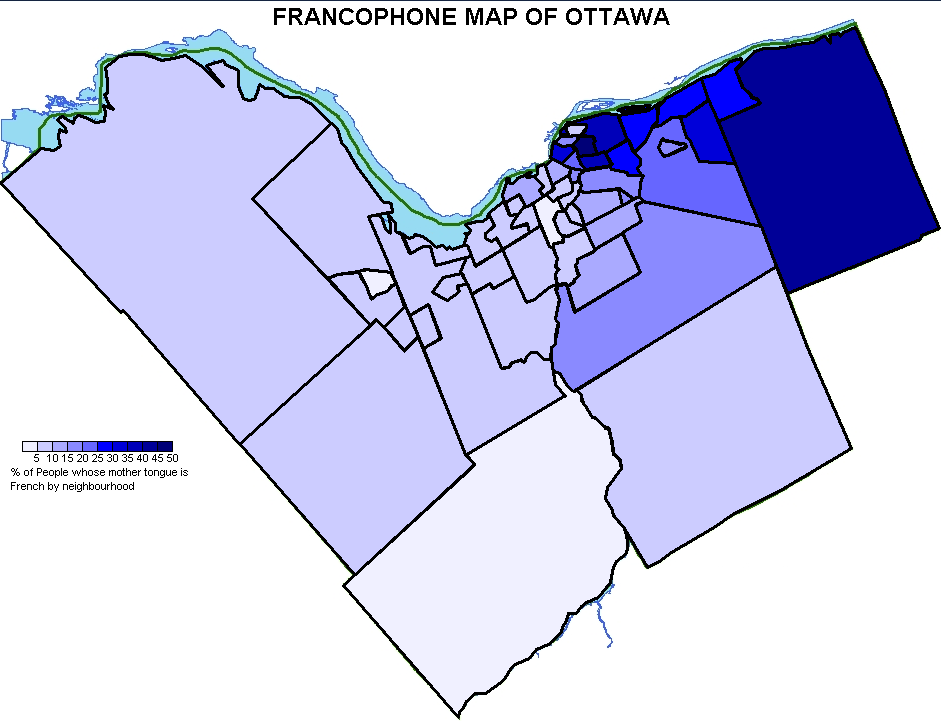
Distribution map showing percentage of Ottawans with French as their mother tongue. Click for more detail.

One controversial aspect of the City of Ottawa Act was the manner in which it addressed official bilingualism within Ottawa's municipal government. Before the enactment of the Act, Glen Shortliffe, a special advisor appointed by the provincial government to make recommendations on municipal governance in Ottawa–Carleton, recommended in 1999 that the new amalgamated city of Ottawa be designated as officially bilingual, with municipal services available in both English and French.

The provincial government of the time, led by the Progressive Conservative Party of Ontario, refused to enshrine official bilingualism in the City of Ottawa Act, but made clear that the new city was free to establish its own language policy. In 2001, Ottawa City Council passed a bilingualism policy modelled on the policy of the former Ottawa–Carleton Region, whereby English and French were both recognized as having the same rights, status and privileges within the municipal government, while allowing for differences in services based on local needs throughout the amalgamated city.

In 2003, the Ontario Liberal Party returned to power at the provincial level, and the new Premier, Dalton McGuinty, publicly stated that the city should be designated bilingual in the Act. Rather than reignite the controversy through a designation, however, the province ultimately announced amendments to the Act in 2004 (which came into force in 2005) to require the city of Ottawa to have a policy respecting its use of French and English. City council revised its bilingualism policy in 2004, offering all its municipal services in both French and English.

== See also ==
- Official bilingualism in Canada
