= Sir Robert Borden High School =

Location
- 131 Greenbank Road; Ottawa, Ontario, K2H 8R1; Canada; 45°19′58″N 75°46′53″W

Information
- Founded: 1969
- School board: Ottawa Carleton District School Board
- Superintendent: Frank Wiley
- Area trustee: Donna Blackburn
- Administrator: Toni Bernard
- Principal: Aaron Hobbs
- Staff: 20
- Teaching staff: 65
- Grades: 7-12
- Enrolment: 705 (2021–22)
- Language: English, French Immersion
- Hours in school day: 9:00 am to 3:10 pm for High-schoolers, 8:50 am to 3:20 pm for the Middle-schoolers Monday to Friday
- Campus: Suburban
- Colours: Royal Blue and Gold
- Mascot: Bolt the Bengal
- Team name: SRB Bengals and Blues (hockey only)
- Communities served: Craig Henry, Briargreen, Knoxdale, Manordale, Leslie Park, Centerpointe, Qualicum, Trend-Arlington
- Website: sirrobertbordenhs.ocdsb.ca//

Sir Robert Borden High School (SRB, Borden) is a high school located on Greenbank Road in the Nepean district of Ottawa, Ontario, Canada. Adjacent to the main office of the Ottawa-Carleton District School Board, this school was built in 1969 and officially opened on December 5, 1969. It is named after the late Conservative Prime Minister of Canada, Robert Borden.

Architecturally, the building itself is divided into several different wings. The wing known affectionately as "The Square" (Named after its imposing shape overlooking Greenbank Road) houses the science, computer, English, and combined French and social sciences departments. Another wing, "The Circle", which overlooks sports fields and a local neighbourhood, houses the Technology and Drama departments, the keyboarding room and all Grade 7 to 8 classes starting in 2017-2018 School year. These two wings are centred on a foyer on the main level, which is a popular place for students to socialize.

The additional courses are provided in portables northeast of most of the school near where the Middle-schoolers have recess. The portables contains the remainder of the departments that could not fit into the interior of the school due to the allocated space to the Grade 7/8s. The portables also contains the Athletics department, as the Health units of Gym/Fitness and certain courses is taught there. The Foyer is the centre of the school, being at the entrance in cross-roads between the square, gymnasium, auditorium, locker bay and library.

The foyer is currently used to host activities like the "Foyer Games" which is a party game-like activity with games like Horses and Cavaliers occurring during Fridays, Thursdays when Friday isn't available and Spirit Weeks. A sound system was installed to facilitate performances by student bands or student council activities over the lunch hour during 1999. However, and as of 2019 it is currently not being used and unplugged in lieu of bringing speakers in. There is also a multi-purpose auditorium, which has partitions which can divide the hall into three smaller lecture theatres, and 2 large gymnasiums with their own partitions, which makes them ideal for hosting high school athletics.

Sir Robert Borden High School is often recognized in its community for its leading music, arts and athletics programs, having won many local sports championships and arts and music competitions. The school mascot, Bolt the Bengal, represents its many sports teams and clubs.

The school is also used after hours and on weekends by many community groups and sports leagues, and is often used as a polling station in municipal, provincial and federal elections.

Starting with the 2017-2018 year, the school includes grades 7-12, absorbing Greenbank Middle School. The school's principal is Aaron Hobbs.

== Programs offered ==
- Bilingual Program
- Cooperative Education
- Extended French
- Learning Disabled Program
- Semestered
- Summer courses (when construction isn't present)
- SHSM
- The Cooper Test
- AP Math and French

== Controversies ==
On December 1, 2022, a Jewish student at the school was, upon entering a locker room, accosted by students who imitated speaking in German and made a Nazi salute, and the students had also constructed a large swastika on the floor out of ski poles.

On 11 November 2024 the school played "Haza Salam", an Arabic-language song associated with Palestinian protest in the aftermath of the October 7 attacks, as the only music during the Remembrance Day slide show at the school. Jewish students complained, and the school's principal initially defended the song choice but later apologized to parents for causing distress by including a song "that could be seen as politically charged". The use of the song has been questioned by students' parents, the Ottawa Carleton District School Board, the Jewish Federation of Ottawa, and the local member of provincial Parliament, Lisa MacLeod.

== Notable alumni ==
- Andrew Calof - professional hockey player
- Rajeev Dehejia - economics professor
- Barbara Dunkelman - Rooster Teeth personality and voice actress best known for playing Yang Xiao Long in the animated series RWBY
- Damon Barlow - Call of Duty world champion
- Fred Brathwaite - professional hockey player (former NHL player)
- Roshell Bissett - film producer
- Dan Kanter - guitarist
- Patrick Hayden - scientist
- Kim Brunhuber - CBC reporter
- Ian Black - CBC meteorologist
- Anthony Lemke - actor
- Robert Livingstone - sport business producer / journalist
- Shawn Menard - city councillor
- Sandra Oh - actress
- Darren Pang - retired NHL player
- Jeff Zywicki - professional lacrosse player
- Sekou Kaba - Olympic hurdler
- Alison Kreviazuk - curler
- Lynn Kreviazuk - curler
- Cheryl Kreviazuk - curler

== See also ==
- Education in Ontario
- List of secondary schools in Ontario
