= Garfield Mahood =

Canadian non-smokers' rights activist

Garfield Mahood is a Canadian non-smokers' rights activist. He was the long-time Executive Director of the Non-Smokers' Rights Association (NSRA) and its sister charity, the Smoking and Health Action Foundation (SHAF), since soon after their creation in 1974.

== Awards ==
In 1997, Mahood received the Canadian Cancer Society's R.M. Taylor Medal and Award, their highest award. In 2007, Garfield Mahood received the Order of Canada for his life's work in tobacco control.
