= Professional Institute of the Public Service of Canada =

Trade union

- Abbreviation: PIPSC
- Formation: 1920; 106 years ago
- Type: Trade union
- Headquarters: Ottawa, Ontario, Canada
- Location: Canada
- Members: 85,000
- Official languages: English; French
- President: Sean O'Reilly
- Affiliations: Canadian Labour Congress
- Staff: Approx. 140
- Website: pipsc.ca

The Professional Institute of the Public Service of Canada (PIPSC) is the largest multi-professional labour union in Canada, representing some 85,000 public service professionals employed at the federal and some provincial and territorial levels of government. It was founded in 1920 to protect the interests of professional public employees. The institute became a bargaining agent following the implementation of the Public Service Staff Relations Act in 1967. It is the bargaining agent for more than 41 knowledge-based groups and negotiates with 27 different employers in six different jurisdictions. The institute serves its members with approximately 140 full-time staff in its national office in Ottawa, and regional offices in Halifax, Montreal, Toronto, Winnipeg, Edmonton, and Vancouver. A 100th anniversary history of the union, by labour historian Jason Russell, was published in 2020 under the title Leading Progress: The Professional Institute of the Public Service of Canada, 1920-2020 (Toronto: Between the Lines, 2020).

== History ==
The Professional Institute of the Public Service of Canada was founded on 6 February 1920.

In 1967, the Public Service Staff Relations Act was passed in Canada, which allowed federal public workers to bargain collectively. That led to the PIPSC moving away from being a professional association and instead becoming a trade union.
