= Non-Smokers' Rights Association =

The Non-Smokers' Rights Association (NSRA) is a Canadian non-profit organization dedicated to fighting tobacco usage. It was founded in Toronto by nurse Rosalee Berlin, and quickly evolved into an international leader on the issues of tobacco control, especially tobacco advertising, tobacco sponsorship, and tobacco packaging.

Its sister non-profit organization is the Smoking and Health Action Foundation (SHAF), a registered charity in Canada. SHAF provides education on the issues of tobacco control. Garfield Mahood, O.C., has been Executive Director of the NSRA and SHAF since soon after their creation in 1974.

The Non-smokers' Rights Association (NSRA) and the Smoking and Health Action Foundation (SHAF) were forced to shut down in 2017 due to the federal government's failure to restore their core funding.

== Awards ==
In 2000, the NSRA received the American Cancer Society's Luther L. Terry Award For Exemplary Leadership in Tobacco Control, in the category of "Outstanding Organization".

The NSRA has also been awarded the World Health Organization's Gold Medal for tobacco control, as well as the Canadian Cancer Society's Award of Merit.
