= Steve Desroches =

Politician in Ottawa, Ontario, Canada

Ottawa City Councillor
- Incumbent
- Assumed office November 15, 2022
- Preceded by: Carol Anne Meehan
- Constituency: Riverside South-Findlay Creek Ward
- In office December 1, 2006 – December 1, 2014
- Preceded by: Ward created
- Succeeded by: Michael Qaqish
- Constituency: Gloucester-South Nepean Ward

Deputy Mayor of Ottawa
- In office December 1, 2010 – December 1, 2014 Serving with Eli El-Chantiry
- Succeeded by: Mark Taylor & Bob Monette

Personal details
- Born: 1969 (age 56–57) Midland, Ontario, Canada
- Party: Independent
- Spouse: Michelle Desroches
- Children: 4
- Education: University of Ottawa (MA); Carleton University (MA)

Steve Desroches (born 1969) is a politician in Ottawa, Ontario, Canada. He is a member of Ottawa City Council, representing Riverside South-Findlay Creek Ward since 2022. He was previously a member of Ottawa City Council from 2006 to 2014, representing for Gloucester-South Nepean Ward, a ward representing some of Ottawa's southern suburbs. He was first elected in the 2006 municipal election, and was re-elected in the 2010 municipal election.

Desroches studied at the University of Ottawa and Carleton University, where he obtained a Master's degree in public administration. Prior to his entry in municipal politics, Desroches worked for several Ministries in the federal government as well as the office of the Auditor General. He was a trustee at the Ottawa Public Library Board and also a vice-chair in the OC Transpo Advisory Committee. He was also the vice-present of the Riverside South Community Association. At the time of the 2006 election, he was employed by the Department of Agriculture.

In the 2006 election, Desroches defeated former Ottawa-Carleton Regional Chair Andrew Haydon to become the first councillor of this new ward which included about half of Barrhaven, Riverside South and Findlay Creek.

He listed his priorities as to improving infrastructures in the ward that is under massive development, including improving roads and public transit. Public Safety and fiscal management were also key priorities in his campaign and for his upcoming term at City Council. He was also a supporter of the now-cancelled expansion of the City's O-Train north-south light-rail expansion project which would have served Riverside South and Barrhaven South starting in 2009.

Desroches was easily re-elected in 2010, and served until 2014, as he had promised to only serve for two terms.

Following his time on council, Desroches became a member of the Board of Directors of the Perley-Rideau Veterans Health Centre Foundation. In 2015 he was awarded the Minister of Veterans Affairs Commendation for his work to support Canadian veterans. Desroches expressed interest in running for the Conservative Party of Canada in the 2015 Canadian federal election, but ultimately did not. He had also been touted as a potential candidate for the Liberals, but considered his personal politics to be "conservative", due to his economic views.

On May 18, 2022 Desroches announced he would be running for city council once again in the 2022 Ottawa municipal election. He ran in Riverside South-Findlay Creek Ward, a re-drawn version of his old ward.

== Electoral record ==
2022 Ottawa municipal election: Riverside South-Findlay Creek Ward
Candidate	Popular vote			Expenditures
Candidate	Votes	%	±%	Expenditures
Steve Desroches	5,682	67.89		
Zainab Alsalihiy	1,533	18.32		
Salah Elsaadi	900	10.75		
Em McLellan	255	3.05		
Total valid votes	8,370	98.47		
Total rejected, unmarked and declined votes	130	1.53		
Turnout	8,500	42.88	-3.21	
Eligible voters	19,822			
Note: Candidate campaign colours are based on the prominent colour used in campaign items (signs, literature, etc.) and are used as a visual differentiation between candidates.

2010 Ottawa municipal election: Riverside South-Findlay Creek Ward
Candidate	Votes	%
Steve Desroches	7723	84.40
Stephen Knight	1427	15.60

2006 Ottawa municipal election: Riverside South-Findlay Creek Ward
Candidate	Votes	%
Steve Desroches	3599	39.72
Andy Haydon	2602	28.72
Eric Lamoureux	1215	13.41
Tanya Thompson	1037	11.45
Robert McKenney	449	4.96
Don Dransfield	158	1.74
