= Chapman Mills Marketplace =

Shopping mall in Ontario, Canada

Coordinates: 45.27030°N 75.74185°W

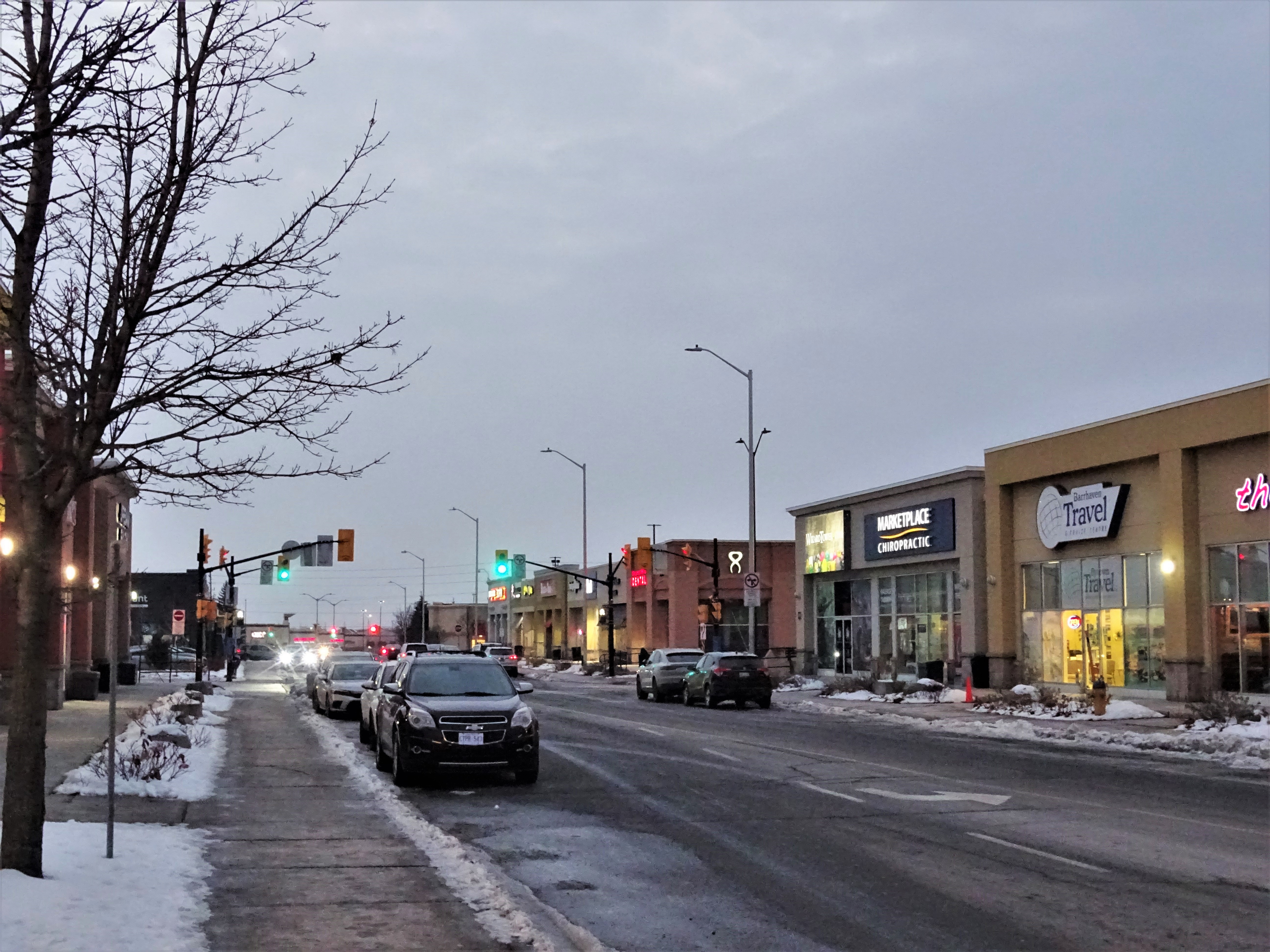
- Marketplace Avenue looking west from Riocan Avenue
- Address: 50 Marketplace Avenue; Ottawa, Ontario; K2J 5G3
- Developer: RioCan
- Num. of stores: 66
- Num. of anchor tenants: 1
- Public transit: Marketplace

Chapman Mills Marketplace is a shopping centre located in the Barrhaven neighbourhood of Ottawa, Ontario, Canada. The borders for the shopping district are Strandherd Drive to the north, Greenbank Road to the west, Longfields Drive to the east, and Chapman Mills Drive to the south.

The centre consists of 20 buildings housing 66 stores and services including a grocery store (Loblaws, its anchor tenant), big box stores (Winners, Walmart), a cinema (Cineplex) and various restaurants. The property is owned by RioCan.

Marketplace station on the southwestern portion of the Transitway provides OC Transpo bus service for the centre.
