= Cedarview Road =

Road in Ottawa, Canada

- "Ottawa Road 23"
- Map of Cedarview Road prior to 2016 renaming Cedarview Road Borrisokane Road William McEwen Drive

Route information
- Maintained by City of Ottawa
- Length: 8.4 km (5.2 mi)

Major junctions
- South end: Cul-de-sac before CN Rail corridor
- North end: Baseline Road

Location
- Country: Canada
- Province: Ontario
- Major cities: Ottawa

Highway system
- Roads in Ontario

Cedarview Road (Ottawa Road #23) is a north–south road in Ottawa, Ontario, Canada. It runs between Bells Corners and Barrhaven. Formerly a major arterial road for Barrhaven residents, its use declined after the opening of Highway 416 in 1999.

Cedarview Road begins in the north at Baseline Road, near the Queensway Carleton Hospital. Prior to the opening of Highway 416, it ran south, passing Bell High School. It has since been re-aligned eastward to make room for a corridor for the highway; the original portion of Cedarview Road that accesses the school has been renamed Cassidy Road.

Continuing southward, Cedarview Road intersects with West Hunt Club Road, formerly Knoxdale Road. Also at this intersection is an interchange with Highway 416. Just south of the intersection is a sharp S-curve following the curve of Highway 416, which has been considered dangerous and has resulted in some car crashes. The speed limit is reduced to 60 km/h as the road passes by the communities of Cedarhill Estates.

South of its intersection with Fallowfield Road, Cedarview Road is a local street in Barrhaven. Before Highway 416 was constructed, Cedarview ran south to Bankfield Road; currently it passes by Cedarview Middle School and Jockvale Road before reaching a dead-end at CN Rail tracks where a pedestrian underpass was constructed. South of the railroad tracks, a short section of the road has been absorbed into Clarke Fields park, a local sports area.

The remaining original alignment was renamed in June 2016. The section of road between Strandherd Drive and Barnsdale Road was renamed to Borrisokane Road. The section between Barnsdale and Brophy Road was re-signed as an extension of William McEwen Drive.
