= Carol Anne Meehan =

Canadian journalist and politician (born 1956)

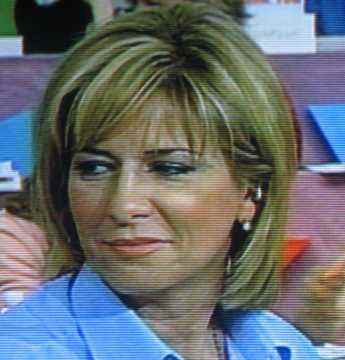
- Television screen capture of Meehan, May 2003

Ottawa City Councillor
- In office December 1, 2018 – November 15, 2022
- Preceded by: Michael Qaqish
- Succeeded by: Steve Desroches
- Constituency: Gloucester-South Nepean Ward

Personal details
- Born: December 17, 1956 (age 69)
- Party: Conservative Party of Canada
- Spouse: Greg Etue (d. 2012)
- Website: Official website

Carol Anne Meehan (born December 17, 1956) is a former Ottawa City Councillor and former news anchor at CJOH.

== Biography ==
She is a graduate of Ryerson University (now Toronto Metropolitan University) and began her career at CHRO in Pembroke, Ontario, the city where she grew up. She also worked in Sudbury, Edmonton and Calgary. In 1989, she began co-anchoring the CJOH Ottawa evening news, then known as Newsline, alongside Max Keeping. She was laid off on November 17, 2015, by station owner Bell Media. Following her departure from CJOH she joined 1310 News as a talk-show host. She left 1310 News in November 2017.

In January 2012, her missing husband was found dead in Brudenell, Ontario.

She lives on the Rideau River near Manotick with her two children.

== Political career ==
Meehan won a seat on Ottawa City Council in Gloucester-South Nepean Ward in the 2018 municipal election, defeating incumbent councillor Michael Qaqish by over 500 votes. She received endorsements from prominent local conservatives including councillor Jan Harder, former councillor Steve Desroches and senator Marjory LeBreton. When she was a teenager, she was a "young Liberal".

In October 2018, shortly after her election, Meehan received media attention for an online confrontation with a constituent. The constituent was raising concerns about OC Transpo bus service in the ward. Meehan responded to the constituent "I would love to have a face to face, because you certainly like to slam me here. Let's see what kind of guts you have. I have the guts and courage to succeed YOU will never have." Meehan also divulged the constituent's street on Facebook, reportedly responding "Give me your address, or I will go and find you on [street name], it's not that long a street." Meehan subsequently apologized and removed the Facebook posts.

While on council, Meehan often voted against mayor Jim Watson's bloc, which has been called the "Watson club".

On February 16, 2022, Meehan resigned from her position on the Ottawa Police Services Board. She announced that she would not seek re-election in the 2022 municipal election on July 25, 2022.

On July 29, 2024, Meehan announced she would be seeking the Conservative Party of Canada nomination in the riding of Ottawa West—Nepean for the next Canadian federal election. However, just 12 days later on August 9, she decided against running.

== Election results ==
Council candidate	Vote	%
Carol Anne Meehan	5,960	42.55
Michael Qaqish (X)	5,420	38.69
Harpreet Singh	2,152	15.36
Zaff Ansari	358	2.56
Irene Mei	118	0.84
