= Barrhaven East Ward =

Barrhaven East
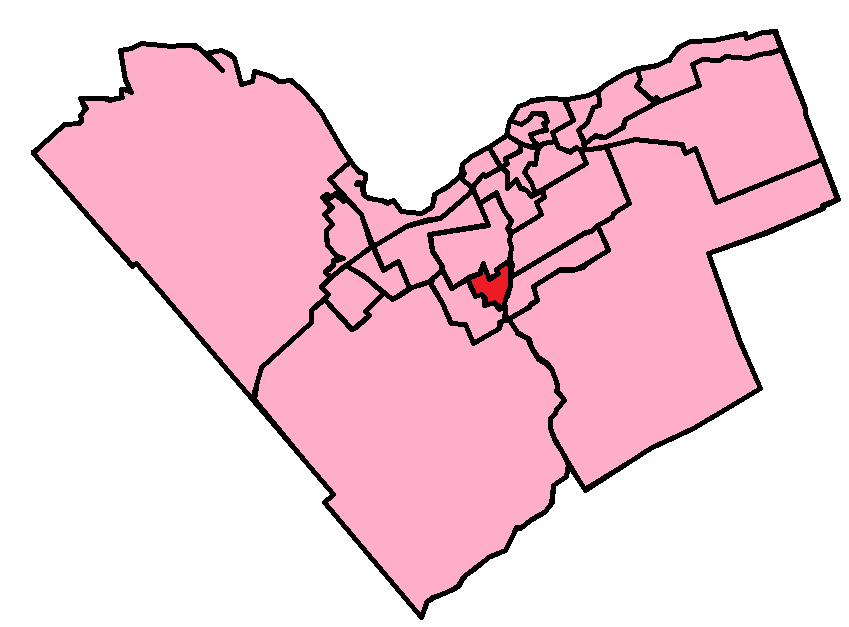
- Location within Ottawa
- Coordinates: 45°16′33″N 75°43′07″W
- Country: Canada
- Province: Ontario
- City: Ottawa

Government
  - Councillor: Wilson Lo

Population (2021)Canada 2021 Census
  - Total: 50,723

Barrhaven East Ward or Ward 24 (French: Quartier Barrhaven-Est) is a municipal ward in Ottawa, Ontario. It consists of the eastern half of the city's Barrhaven subdivision. The ward came into effect at the 2022 Ottawa municipal election. It is represented on Ottawa City Council by Wilson Lo.

The ward consists of the neighbourhoods of Knollsbrook, Longfields, Davidson Heights, Havenlea, Chapman Mills and Heart's Desire.

The ward was created in the 2020 ward boundary review from parts of Barrhaven Ward and Gloucester-South Nepean Ward.

== Election results ==
=== 2026 ===
2026 Ottawa municipal election: Barrhaven East
Candidate	Popular vote			Expenditures
Candidate	Votes	%	±%	Expenditures
Wilson Lo (X)	9,987	76.86		
Yoosaf Melparamba	889	6.84		
Ahmed Alsabaawi	868	6.68		
Jules Ruhinda	701	5.40		
Zahy A Adam	548	4.22		
Total valid votes	13,246			
Total rejected, unmarked and declined votes				
Turnout		34.18		
Eligible voters	38,757			
Note: Candidate campaign colours are based on the prominent colour used in campaign items (signs, literature, etc.) and are used as a visual differentiation between candidates.

=== 2022 ===
2022 Ottawa municipal election: Barrhaven East
Candidate	Popular vote			Expenditures
Candidate	Votes	%	±%	Expenditures
Wilson Lo	4,403	36.82		
Richard Garrick	2,980	24.92		
Patrick Brennan	2,153	18.00		
Kathleen Caught	888	7.43		
Atiq Qureshi	778	6.51		
Guy Boone	516	4.32		
Dominik Janelle	240	2.01		
Total valid votes	11,958	97.66		
Total rejected, unmarked and declined votes	286	2.34		
Turnout	12,244	39.11		
Eligible voters	31,307			
Note: Candidate campaign colours are based on the prominent colour used in campaign items (signs, literature, etc.) and are used as a visual differentiation between candidates.
