= Barrhaven West Ward =

Barrhaven West
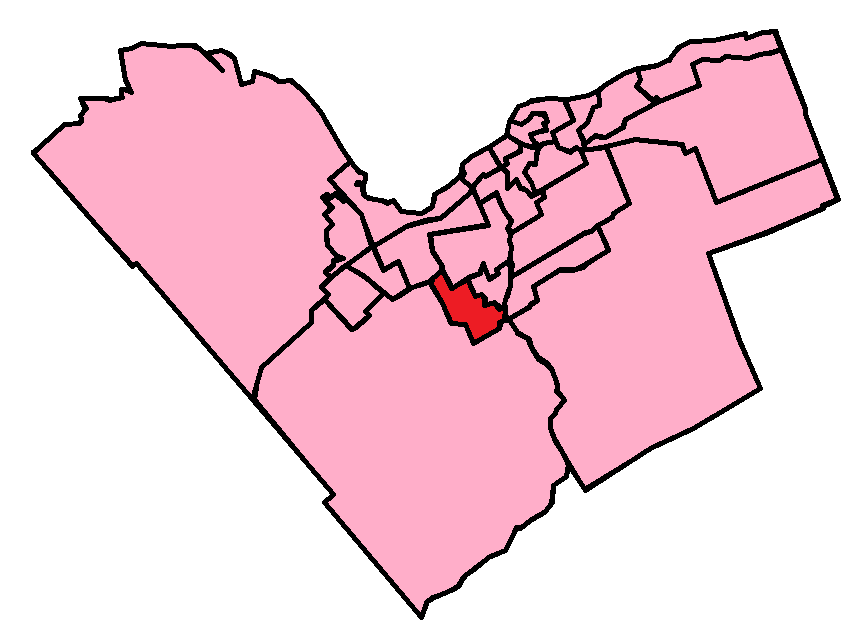
- Location within Ottawa
- Coordinates: 45°16′N 75°44′W
- Country: Canada
- Province: Ontario
- City: Ottawa

Government
  - Councillor: David Hill

Population (2022)
  - Total: 47,253

Languages (2016)
  - English: 67.8%
  - French: 8.0%
  - Mandarin: 3.6%
  - Arabic: 3.3%
  - Cantonese: 1.3%
  - Spanish: 1.3%
  - Punjabi: 1.1%
  - Urdu: 1.0%
  - Vietnamese: 1.0%

Barrhaven West Ward (Ward 3) is a city ward in Ottawa, Ontario, Canada. The ward consists of the western half of the Barrhaven subdivision. It consists of the neighbourhoods of Cedarhill Estates, Orchard Estates, Strandherd Meadows, Old Barrhaven, Barrhaven Mews, Jockvale, Half Moon Bay and Stonebridge.

== History ==
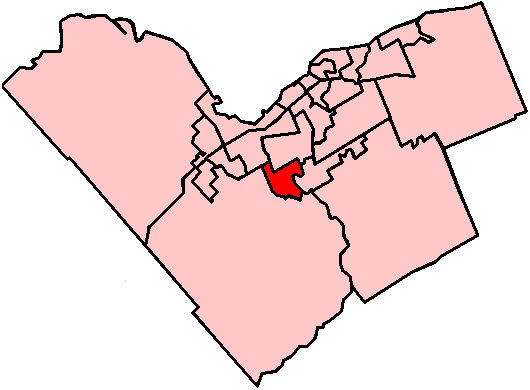
Location of Barrhaven Ward (2006–2022)

From 1994 to 2006, the ward was much larger, also encompassing the neighbourhoods of Heart's Desire, Davidson Heights, Rideau Glen, Boyce, Clearview, Country Place, Victory Hill, Pineglen, Merivale Gardens, Grenfell Glen, Arbeatha Park, Westcliffe Estates, Lynwood Village, Twin Elm, Fallowfield and Bells Corners. From 1997 to 2006, the ward was named Bell-South Nepean Ward. Prior to that, it was just known as Ward 3. In 2006, these areas were transferred to new wards: The Bells Corners area went to College Ward, the areas along Hunt Club joined Knoxdale-Merivale Ward, Heart's Desire and Davidson Heights joined the new Gloucester-South Nepean Ward and the rural parts joined Rideau-Goulbourn Ward.

From 2006 to 2022, the ward was known as Barrhaven Ward, and ward consisted of the neighbourhoods of Cedarhill Estates, Orchard Estates, The Meadows, Pheasant Run, Fraservale, Barrhaven, Knollsbrook and Longfields.

Following the 2020 Ottawa Ward boundary review, the ward's southern boundary was extended to Barnsdale Road to the south, uniting the Half Moon Bay and Stonebridge neighbourhoods into the ward. The ward lost the area east of Greenbank Road and north of the Strandherd Road to the new ward of Barrhaven East.

The Ward had been served by Jan Harder on Ottawa City Council since the area was amalgamated into Ottawa in 2000. She was also the city councillor for Barrhaven Ward on Nepean City Council prior to that, from 1997 to 2000. Doug Collins was the Nepean city councillor from 1994 to 1997.

== Demographics ==
According to the 2011 Canadian census

Ethnic groups: 71.1% White, 6.9% South Asian, 6.4% Chinese, 4.2% Black, 2.7% Arab, 2.2% Aboriginal, 2.1% Southeast Asian, 1.6% Filipino, 1.1% Latin American
Languages: 71.8% English, 7.4% French, 4.7% Chinese, 2.0% Arabic, 1.2% Spanish, 1.1% Italian, 1.1% Vietnamese
Religions: 66.3% Christian (39.3% Catholic, 6.7% United Church, 5.8% Anglican, 2.1% Christian Orthodox, 1.9% Presbyterian, 1.4% Pentecostal, 1.1% Lutheran, 1.1% Baptist, 6.9% Other), 4.9% Muslim, 3.2% Hindu, 1.6% Buddhist, 21.8% No religion
Median income (2010): $45,092
Average income (2010): $50,269

== Regional and city councillors ==
- Prior to 1994, the area was represented by the Mayor of Nepean plus three city and regional councillors.
1. David Pratt (1994-1997)
2. Molly McGoldrick-Larsen (1997-2000)
3. Jan Harder (2001–2022)
4. David Hill (2022–present)

== Election results ==
=== 1994 Ottawa-Carleton Regional Municipality elections ===
Regional council: Ward 3
Candidate	Votes	%
David Pratt	Acclaimed	

Nepean City council: Barrhaven Ward
Candidate	Votes	%
Doug Collins	3,304	58.14
Kim Millan	1,902	33.47
Nick Dean	477	8.39

=== 1997 Ottawa-Carleton Regional Municipality elections ===
Ottawa-Carleton Regional council: Bell-South Nepean Ward
Candidate	Votes	%
Molly McGoldrick-Larsen	8,166	73.16
Brian Beckett	1,831	16.40
Adam Hacker	1,165	10.44

Nepean City council: Barrhaven Ward
Candidate	Votes	%
Jan Harder	3,222	54.72
Mike Kronick	1,841	31.27
Bill Gordon	825	14.01

=== 2000 Ottawa municipal election ===
City council
Candidate	Votes	%
Jan Harder	10640	60.89
Molly McGoldrick-Larsen	6834	39.11

=== 2003 Ottawa municipal election ===
City council
Candidate	Votes	%
Jan Harder	11876	86.75
John R. Palmer	1784	13.25

=== 2006 Ottawa municipal election ===
Longtime incumbent Jan Harder faced off against Cathrine Gardiner a freelance photo journalist, Joe King an agricultural economist and T.K. Chu, a systems engineer.

City council
Candidate	Votes	%
Jan Harder	9433	74.94
Joe King	1468	11.66
T.K. Chu	853	6.78
Cathrine Gardner	833	6.62

=== 2010 Ottawa municipal election ===
City council
Candidate	Votes	%
Jan Harder	8,263	66.31
Rustin Hollywood	2,944	23.62
Joseph King	1,255	10.07

=== 2014 Ottawa municipal election ===
City council
Candidate	Vote	%
Jan Harder	8,686	75.50
Ian Burrsey	2,490	21.64
Syed Asghar Hussain	328	2.85

Ottawa mayor (Ward results)
Candidate	Vote	%
Jim Watson	8,379	74.06
Mike Maguire	2,460	21.74
Anwar Syed	130	1.15
Rebecca Pyrah	95	0.84
Darren W. Wood	78	0.69
Robert White	69	0.61
Bernard Couchman	68	0.60
Michael St. Arnaud	35	0.31

=== 2018 Ottawa municipal election ===
Council candidate	Vote	%
Jan Harder	11,489	74.27
Hadi Wess	2,427	15.69
Franklin Epape	908	5.87
Atiq Qureshi	535	3.46
Ahmad Malgarai	110	0.71

=== 2022 Ottawa municipal election ===
Council candidate	Vote	%
David Hill	6,230	43.97
Taayo Simmonds	4,737	33.43
Jay Chadha	2,200	15.53
Sadaf Ebrahim	1,001	7.07

=== 2026 Ottawa municipal election ===
2026 Ottawa municipal election: Barrhaven West
Candidate	Popular vote			Expenditures
Candidate	Votes	%	±%	Expenditures
David Hill (X)	11,672	70.82		
Jeff Balys	2,413	14.64		
Donna Blackburn	2,396	14.54		
Total valid votes	16,705			
Total rejected, unmarked and declined votes				
Turnout	37.83			
Eligible voters	44,156			
Note: Candidate campaign colours are based on the prominent colour used in campaign items (signs, literature, etc.) and are used as a visual differentiation between candidates.
