= Michael Qaqish =

Canadian politician

Ottawa City Councillor
- In office December 1, 2014 – December 1, 2018
- Preceded by: Steve Desroches
- Succeeded by: Carol Anne Meehan
- Constituency: Gloucester-South Nepean Ward

Personal details
- Born: December 1985 (age 40) Toronto, Ontario

Michael Qaqish (/ˈkækɪʃ/ KAK-ish; born December 1985) was the Ottawa City Councillor for Gloucester-South Nepean Ward. He was elected for the first time in the 2014 Ottawa municipal election. He was defeated by Carol Anne Meehan in the 2018 Ottawa municipal elections.

Qaqish was born in Toronto and lived in Jordan before moving to Ottawa to earn a degree in psychology from Carleton University. Qaqish's background is in journalism. Prior to being elected, he was a contributor to CTV, 580 CFRA, The Hill Times and CHIN Radio. He was the founding president of the Kiwanis Club of Barrhaven. He lives in the Chapman Mills neighbourhood of Barrhaven.

From 2008 to 2012, Qaqish worked as an assistant to Gloucester-South Nepean councillor Steve Desroches, and then worked for Capital Ward councillor David Chernushenko. Before that, Qaqish worked for a number of Liberal Party politicians such as now mayor Jim Watson when he was an MPP, MP Derek Lee and MP Ruby Dhalla.

After the resignation of Foreign Affairs Minister John Baird, Qaqish indicated to the Hill Times that he was encouraged by senior Conservatives to seek the party's nomination in Nepean, but declined on the grounds that he had only been recently elected to Ottawa City Council.

== City Council ==
Michael Qaqish worked directly with Ottawa City Council since 2008 and was a City Councillor for Ward 22 Gloucester-South Nepean Ward from October 2014-December 2018.

As councillor, he worked on the following committees:

- Environment Committee - Member
- Transit Commission - Vice Chair
- Community and Protective Services Committee - Member
- Ottawa Board of Health - Member
- Transportation Committee - Member

Qaqish's expenses were drawn into question when the CBC conducted an investigation into Ottawa councillors' spending. It was found that he devoted more on promotional material than his colleagues. As a new councillor, however, this was expected. Moreover, he is acknowledged for being one of only two councillors who declined the annual car allowance.

As of 2019, Qaqish is working in government consulting and may still have his sights on a run for office in the coming years.

== Work with Refugees ==
Michael Qaqish was appointed to Special Liaison for Refugee Resettlement in January 2016 and will be in this additional role until the end of this Term of Council. In May 2016, Qaqish co-hosted a welcome party for approximately 1,500 Syrian refugees with Ottawa Mayor Jim Watson at the Aberdeen Pavilion in Lansdowne Park. Michael Qaqish was inducted to United Way's Wall of Inspiration with a Community Builder of the Year award on March 2, 2017, due to his work with refugee resettlement efforts.
