= Ward 22 =

Ward 22 can mean:

- Ward 22 Scarborough—Agincourt on Toronto City Council
- Gloucester-South Nepean Ward (also known as Ward 22) on Ottawa City Council
