= Jockvale, Ottawa =

Coordinates: 45.254°N 75.740°W

Location of Jockvale in Ontario

Jockvale is a community in the Canadian province of Ontario, located within Barrhaven Ward in the city of Ottawa.

The community consists of a cluster of houses at the intersection Jockvale Road and Greenbank Road, surrounded by the suburban community of Barrhaven. According to the Canada 2016 Census, the population of Jockvale was 24. Jockvale is also the name of a nearby school.
