= Riverside South-Findlay Creek Ward =

Riverside South-Findlay Creek
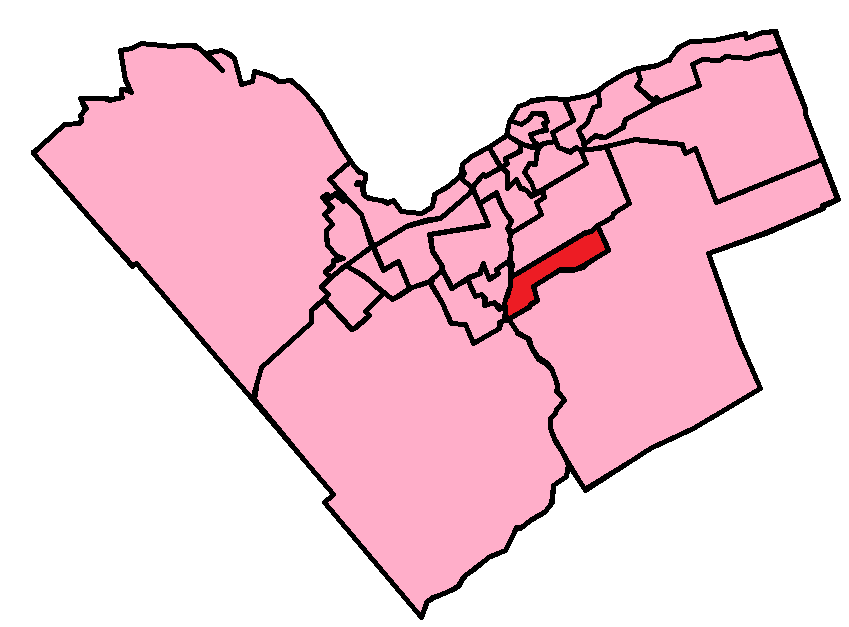
- Coordinates: 45°17′N 75°40′W
- Country: Canada
- Province: Ontario
- City: Ottawa

Government
  - Councillor: Steve Desroches

Population (2022)
  - Total: 36,066

Languages (2016)
  - English: 59.7%
  - French: 9.7%
  - Arabic: 6.0%
  - Mandarin: 4.6%
  - Cantonese: 2.2%
  - Persian: 1.5%
  - Vietnamese: 1.3%
  - Italian: 1.2%
  - Punjabi: 1.1%
  - Spanish: 1.1%

Riverside South-Findlay Creek Ward or Ward 22 is a city ward located in Ottawa, Ontario. Situated in the south end of the city, the ward includes the communities of Riverside South and Findlay Creek in the former city of Gloucester.

== History ==
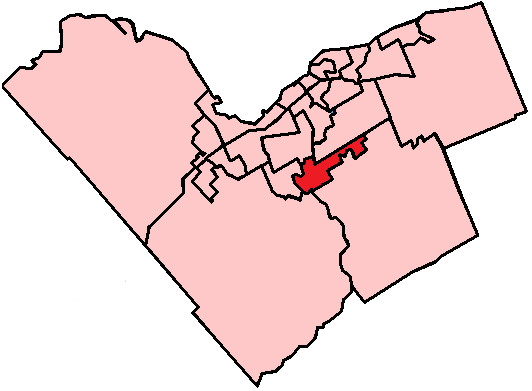
Location of Gloucester-South Nepean Ward from 2006 to 2022

The ward was created in 2006 from parts of Bell-South Nepean and Gloucester-Southgate Wards due to the rapid growth in both communities. It was known as Gloucester-South Nepean Ward until 2022. During this time, the ward also consisted of the neighbourhoods of Chapman Mills, Stonebridge and Davidson Heights in Barrhaven. Stonebridge was transferred to Barrhaven West Ward, while Chapman Mills and Davidson Heights were transferred to the new Barrhaven East Ward in 2022.

== City councillors ==
1. Steve Desroches (2006-2014)
2. Michael Qaqish (2014-2018)
3. Carol Anne Meehan (2018–2022)
4. Steve Desroches (2022–present)

== Election results ==
=== 2006 Ottawa municipal election ===
City council
Candidate	Votes	%
Steve Desroches	3599	39.72
Andy Haydon	2602	28.72
Eric Lamoureux	1215	13.41
Tanya Thompson	1037	11.45
Robert McKenney	449	4.96
Don Dransfield	158	1.74

=== 2010 Ottawa municipal election ===
City council
Candidate	Votes	%
Steve Desroches	7723	84.40
Stephen Knight	1427	15.60

=== 2014 Ottawa municipal election ===
City council
Candidate	Votes	%
Michael Qaqish	4138	38.58
Jason Kelly	1942	18.11
Eric Lamoureux	1215	13.41
Susan Sherring	1854	17.29
Scott Hodge	1630	15.20
Bader Rashed	1040	9.70

=== 2018 Ottawa municipal election ===
Council candidate	Vote	%
Carol Anne Meehan	5,960	42.55
Michael Qaqish	5,420	38.69
Harpreet Singh	2,152	15.36
Zaff Ansari	358	2.56
Irene Mei	118	0.84

=== 2022 Ottawa municipal election ===
Council candidate	Vote	%
Steve Desroches	5,682	67.89
Zainab Alsalihiy	1,533	18.32
Salah Elsaadi	900	10.75
Em McLellan	255	3.05

=== 2026 Ottawa municipal election ===
2026 Ottawa municipal election: Riverside South-Findlay Creek
Candidate	Popular vote			Expenditures
Candidate	Votes	%	±%	Expenditures
Steve Desroches (X)	7,702	84.98		
Muyiwa Ojo	1,361	15.02		
Total valid votes	9,295			
Total rejected, unmarked and declined votes				
Turnout		29.14		
Eligible voters	31,902			
Note: Candidate campaign colours are based on the prominent colour used in campaign items (signs, literature, etc.) and are used as a visual differentiation between candidates.
