= RioCan Real Estate Investment Trust =

Canadian real estate investment trust

- Type: Public
- Traded as: TSX: REI.UN; S&P/TSX Composite Component
- Industry: REIT - Retail
- Headquarters: Toronto, Ontario, Canada
- Number of locations: 164 properties (2026)
- Area served: Canada
- Key people: Edward Sonshine, CEO and founder
- Number of employees: 493 (2026)
- Website: www.riocan.com

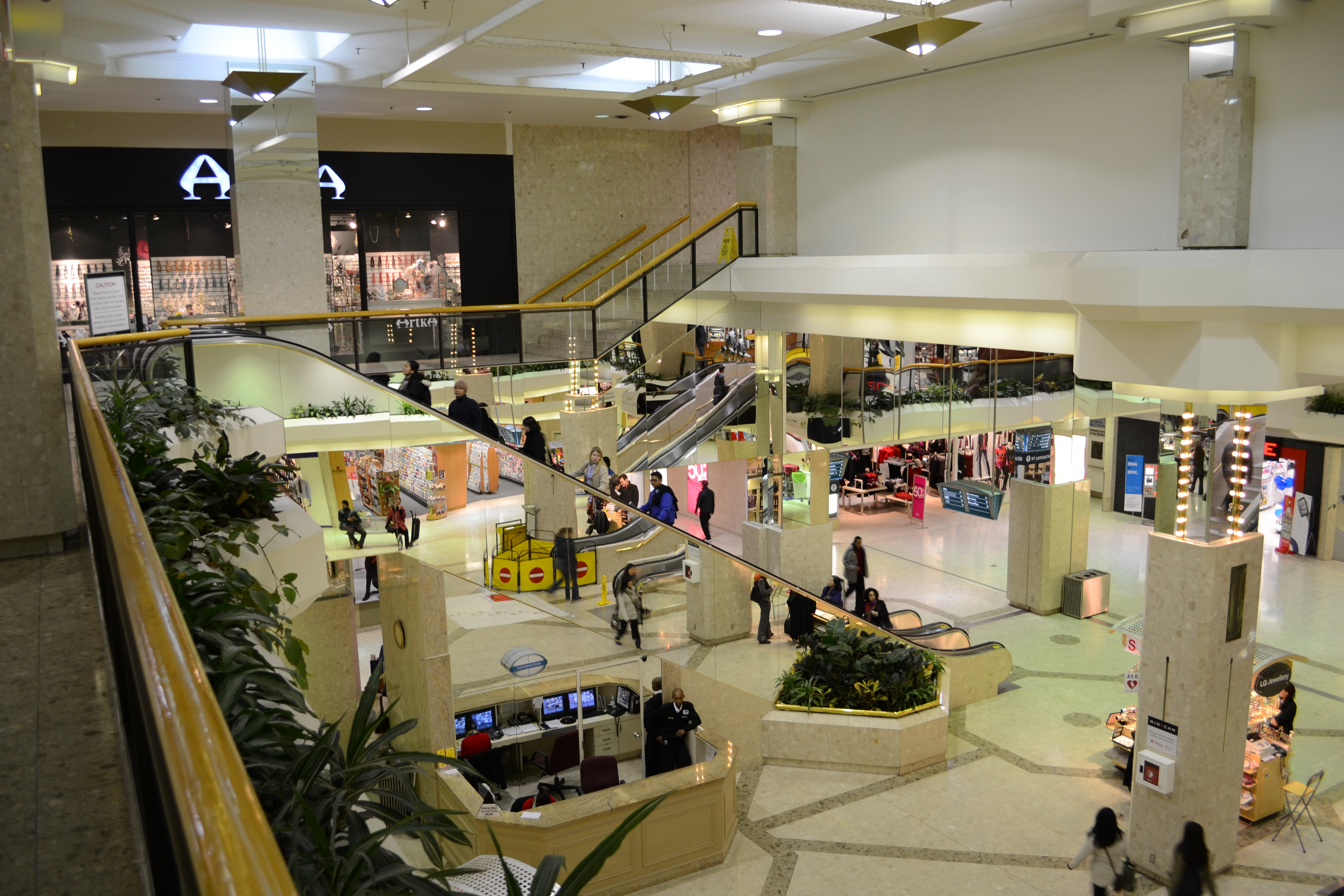
RioCan Yonge Eglinton Centre in Toronto during November 2010.

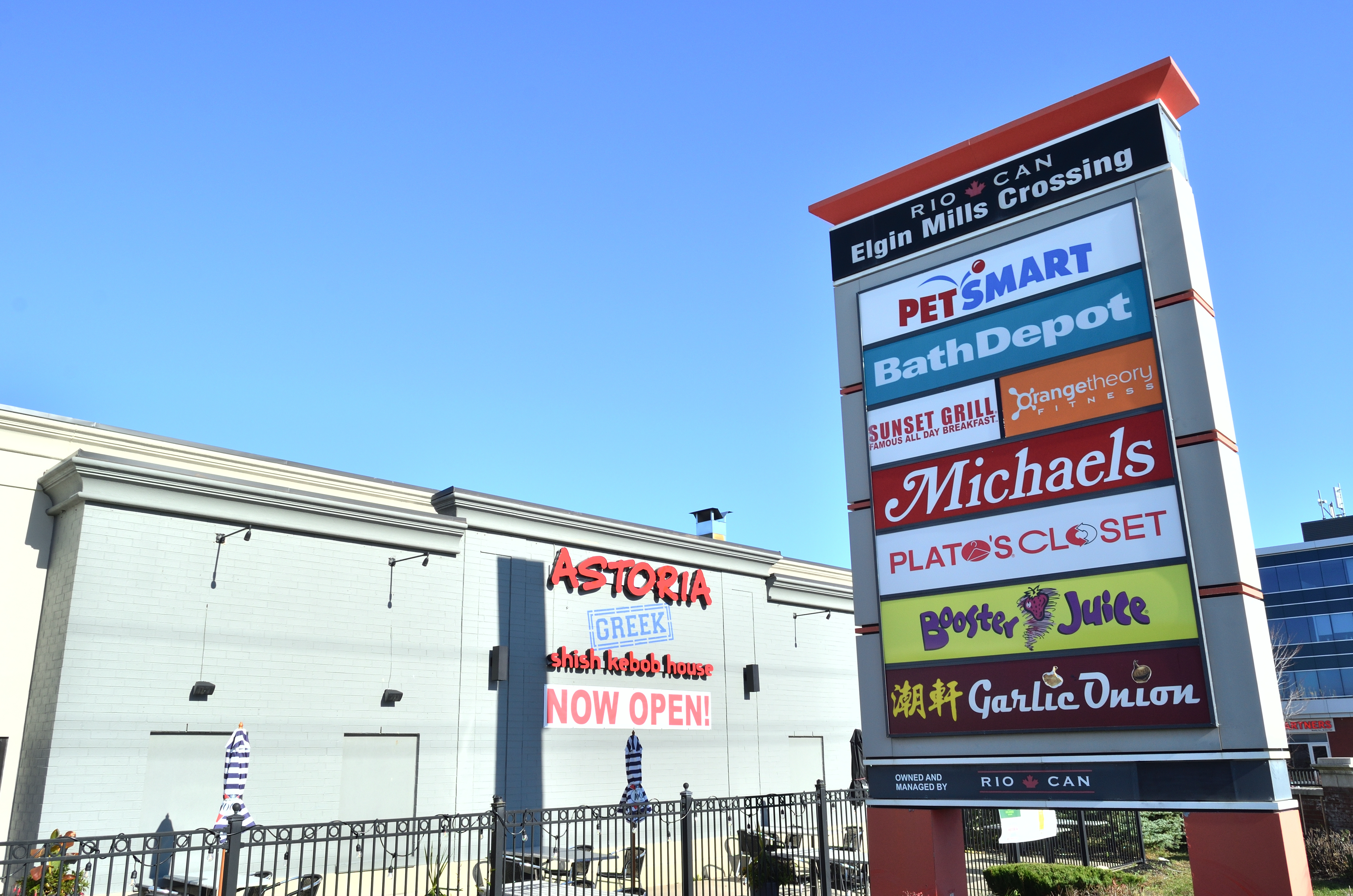
RioCan Elgin Mills Crossing in October 2020

RioCan Real Estate Investment Trust is the second-largest real estate investment trust (REIT) in Canada. As of the second quarter of 2026, it has an enterprise value of approximately $13.6 billion and owns 164 properties with a net leasable area of 31.4 million square feet. The company properties are located across Canada. The current chief executive officer is Jonathan Gitlin.

== History ==
=== Early history ===
RioCan was founded in 1993, by its former CEO Edward Sonshine, as Counsel REIT. It was one of the first real estate investment trusts in Canada. The company held an IPO on the Toronto Stock Exchange in 1994. In 1995, it re-structured to internalize its asset management responsibilities, in return for a $5 million payment. As part of the re-structuring, the company was renamed RioCan REIT, a short form for "Retail Industrial Office Canadian".

RioCan achieved significant growth in its early history, with an annualized 16% return from its IPO to 2013. This growth was achieved in part through acquisitions. In 1995, it acquired five shopping centres in Ottawa from Ivanhoe Inc. for $42.5 million, almost doubling the size of the company (at the time, it had 29 properties). In 1998, it acquired nine shopping centres from Burnac Inc, its largest acquisition up to that time. Also in 1998, the company launched an ultimately successful hostile takeover bid for Realfund REIT. The new company had a market value of more than $1 billion, and was Canada's largest REIT.

=== US expansion ===
In 2006, RioCan announced a planned expansion into the United States, through a $1 billion joint-venture with Ramco-Gershenson Properties Trust. However, this deal fell apart before closing. In 2010, the firm launched a successful expansion into the United States, taking advantage of low real estate prices there. By 2012, 15% of RioCan's revenue was from the United States, and it planned to expand the percentage to 20%. In December 2015, RioCan sold its U.S. portfolio to Blackstone Real Estate Partners VIII, for C$2.7 billion. The deal was triggered by the low value of the Canadian dollar. RioCan used some of the proceeds of the deal to fund its previously announced buyout of Kimco Realty's joint venture stake for $715 million.

=== Recent History ===
In 2011, RioCan announced a $1 billion joint venture with Tanger Factory Outlet Centers to develop 10-15 centres in Canada. RioCan was significantly affected by the sale of Zellers to Target, and the resulting closure of Zellers stores in Canada, as well as the closure of Target Canada. Target eventually paid RioCan $132 million to get out of its leases.

=== Change of strategy ===
Starting around 2015, RioCan entered the residential real estate market, due to the threat from e-commerce to traditional retail. The company plans to re-develop many of its malls with high-rise apartments, including Westgate Mall in Ottawa. By March 2018, when the company announced the RioCan Living Brand, it had 2,800 units planned in eight of its shopping centres.

In October 2017, the firm announced it would sell about $2 billion worth of properties by 2019. The sales would mainly be in smaller urban centres; the company plans to focus on the six largest Canadian cities of Toronto, Montreal, Ottawa, Calgary, Edmonton, and Vancouver. At the time of the announcement, RioCan had 299 properties, and intended to sell about 100. RioCan's six largest markets already accounted for 75% of revenue, and planned to increase that percentage to 90%.

== Properties ==
RioCan invests primarily in supermarket and junior department store-anchored, neighbourhood, convenience-oriented shopping centres. It owns both enclosed malls and power centres, in a large range of sizes. RioCan tries to ensure that no one tenant makes up more than 10% of its rental revenue, in contrast to some other retail REITS (such as Choice Properties REIT) whose revenues are dominated by a single tenant. As of the second quarter of 2026, its largest tenant was Canadian Tire, with about 5% of rental revenue. As of 2017, 66% of revenue was from Ontario, 15% was from Alberta, 9% was from Quebec, 8% was from British Columbia, and the rest was from the rest of Canada.

Properties owned by RioCan include Lawrence Allen Centre in Toronto, Chapman Mills Marketplace in Ottawa, RioCan Centre Kingston in Kingston, and Burlington Centre in Burlington.
