= Cedarhill Estate =

Neighbourhood in Ottawa, Ontario, Canada

Coordinates: 45.2873°N 75.7926°W

Cedarhill Estates (also spelled Cedar Hill) is a neighbourhood located in Barrhaven Ward in the west end of Ottawa. Prior to amalgamation in 2001, it was located in Nepean. Together with Orchard Estates and the Onassa Springs development, it is located within the western part of the Ottawa Greenbelt. It is bordered by Fallowfield Road to the south, Cedarview Road to the east, and by Highway 416 to the north and west. It is located northwest of the Barrhaven suburb of the city. The neighbourhood surrounds the Cedarhill Golf Course. The neighbourhood by two nearby interchanges via Highway 416.

It is a community comprising approximately 100 custom homes built on 1-acre (4,000 m^{2}) lots. They are serviced by city water and streets, but there are no septic sewers. Each property has its own septic system. The properties are zoned country estate lots and the community does not have bus service, sidewalks, or other features of densely populated urban areas.

The neighbourhood was established in 1979.

The Cedarhill Community Association is supported by its residents through voluntary fundraising. Typically, over 80 percent of the community contribute on an annual basis. Community funds are used mainly to grow flowers and plants in community flower beds and to keep the common areas trimmed and weed free.

Nearby schools include St. Patrick, Barrhaven Public, Cedarview, Knoxdale, Mary Honeywell and Greenbank. Nearby high schools are St. Joseph, Sir Robert Borden, John McCrae and Mother Teresa.
