= Half Moon Bay, Ottawa =

Neighbourhood in Ottawa, Ontario, Canada

Half Moon Bay
- Neighbourhood
- Location of Half Moon Bay in Ottawa
- Coordinates: 45.2563°N 75.7342°W
- Country: Canada
- Province: Ontario
- City: Ottawa
- Approved: 1997
- Official Plan: 2006
- Construction: 2007

Area
  - Total: 500.5 ha (1,237 acres)

Population (2021)
  - Total: 15,219
- Forward sortation area: K2J
- Area code(s): Area codes 613, 343, and 753

Half Moon Bay is a community in the suburb of Barrhaven, in Ottawa, Ontario, Canada, located in the Barrhaven West Ward of Ottawa. It is south of the Jock River and neighbours Stonebridge, a golf course community. It is located about 20 km from Downtown Ottawa. The name was selected by Mattamy. The 2021 census saw a near double increase in population of Half Moon Bay from the 2016 census, rising to a population of 15,219, and is currently one of Ottawa's fastest growing communities.

== Geography ==
The area is bordered east of Borrisokane Road, south of the Jock River, west of Greenbank Road, (Note: North of Cambrian Road, the boundaries extend to west of Longfields Road.) and north of Barnsdale Road. Main through-roads include Cambrian and Greenbank. The area is surrounded by rural farmland on the west and south, and by Barrhaven to the north and Stonebridge to the east.

There are three main sections of Half Moon Bay; one being the oldest part of the community, referred to as just Half Moon Bay, which is east of the proposed realigned Greenbank, south of the Jock River, west of Longfields, and north of Cambrian. To the west, there is a section named Half Moon Bay West, which is bounded east of Borrisokane, south of the Jock River, west of the realigned Greenbank, and north of Cambrian. It is currently under its last phase of development. Another new section of Half Moon Bay referred to as Quinn's Pointe, which is currently under active development, is east of Borrisokane, south of Cambrian, west of Greenbank, and north of Barnsdale.

== History ==
=== Construction ===
Before the rapid urban expansion of Barrhaven south of the Jock River, the area consisted of rural farmland. Development of Barrhaven South was first approved in 1997, after the Area 7 Secondary Plan was approved by the pre-amalgamation Nepean City Council, which planned development of both Stonebridge and Half Moon Bay. In 2006, the final plan was released, and in 2007, the first construction of homes in the area began. There are many developers in the region, including (now defunct) Monarch, Minto, Mattamy, Richcraft, and Tamarack. Mattamy is the largest of them, and did the bulk of advertising the area.

=== Infrastructure ===
==== Commercial ====
On October 30, 2025, a Food Basics opened on the future intersection of Cambrian and realigned Greenbank, becoming the first major retail tenant to open in Barrhaven South. In the near future, the area will become very commercialized, centered around the future realigned Greenbank and the future transit station. A No Frills and Shoppers Drug Mart will open soon at this centre.

==== Transportation ====
Since the first design plan for Barrhaven South in 2006, Greenbank Road was slated for realignment further to the west, complete with a new segment of the Southwest Transitway. However, it was pushed back for two decades due to a shift in budgeting concerns. Barrhaven South currently has a smaller, two lane bridge which would cause traffic issues as the population grew.

=== Events ===
In 2018, some residents complained about the new Trail Road waste facility, describing the smell as "chemical", and "organic". The cause was identified as recent heavy rain striking the area. The city of Ottawa has taken measures to reduce the smell.

On July 13, 2023, two EF1 rated tornadoes touched down in Half Moon Bay and Barrhaven at 12:44 PM and 12:45 PM respectively. The line of damage was about 5 kilometres with a maximum width of 200 metres. Both tornadoes had a maximum wind speed of 155 km/h, falling in the EF1 category. At least 125 homes were damaged with varying severity, including damage of roof shingles and sheeting, trees going down and broken windows. One minor injury had been reported.

== Amenities ==
Half Moon Bay is home to many catholic and public schools built since the 2010s. Major parks such as Half Moon Bay Park hold a splash pad and playground, soccer fields and tennis courts, and Half Moon Bay District Park provides a recreational walking opportunity around a local stormwater pond. The Minto Recreation Complex, located on the intersection of Greenbank and Cambrian is a city-run community complex featuring a gymnasium, a weight and exercise room, two pools, two skating rinks, a walking track, and many other multi-use rooms. It opened November 29, 2014. Directly south of the building is Ottawa Fire Station 47, and the Quinn's Pointe Field, a CFL-sized artificial playing football field.

The majority of Half Moon Bay consists of residential zoning, including single-family homes, townhomes, short condominiums, and parks, like other newly built suburbs in Ottawa. The only exception is the new commercial centre that is developing on Cambrian.

== Infrastructure ==
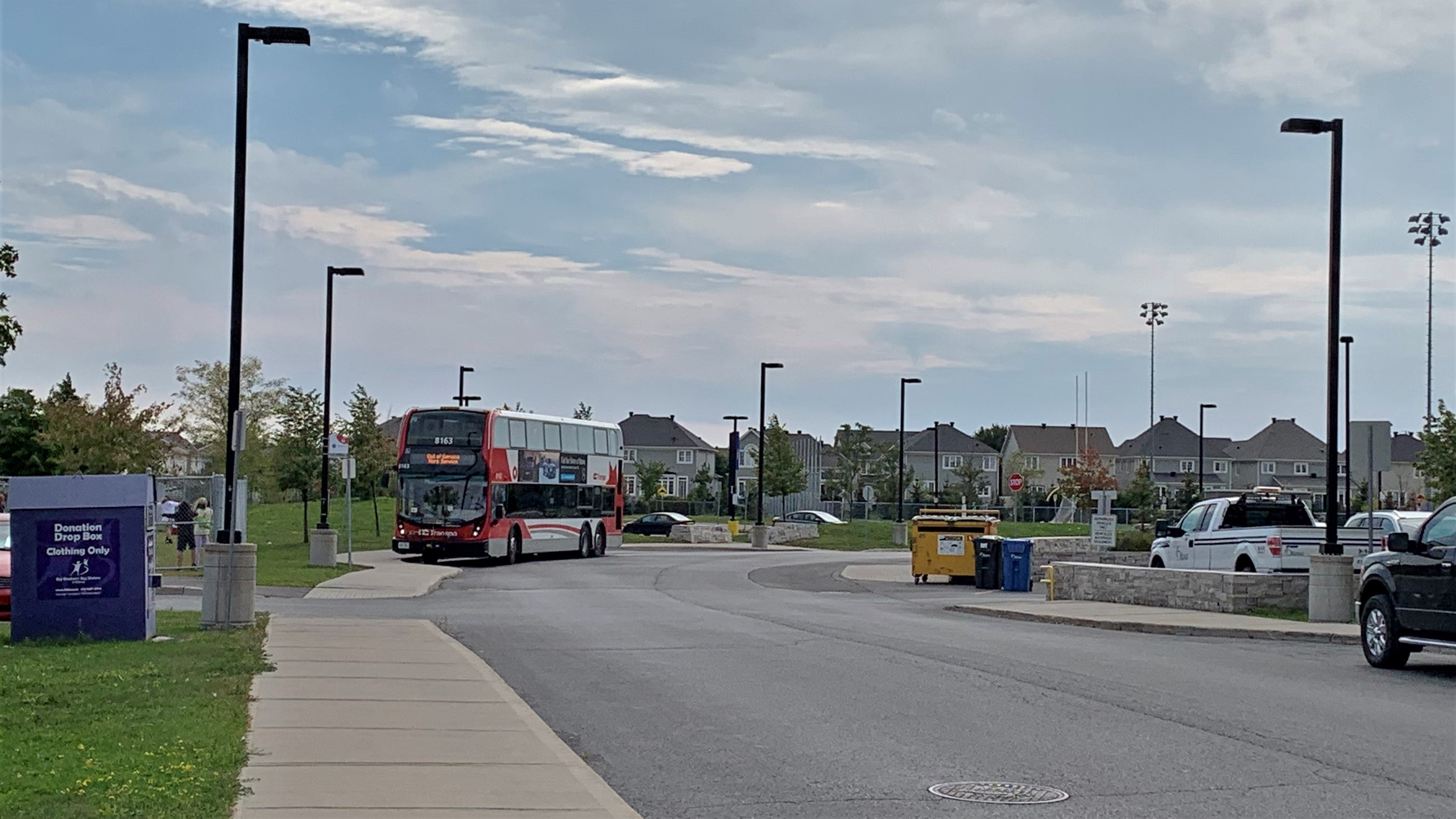
Cambrian Station at the Minto Recreation Complex

=== Transportation ===
Half Moon Bay is quite far from Downtown Ottawa, as it is generally isolated, and currently does not have much OC Transpo service outside one frequent route, the 75, and one Connexion route, the 275. As a result, most people drive. There are a variety of 600-series routes serving the secondary schools that are not located in Half Moon Bay.

A new realigned Greenbank Road is slated for construction in Spring 2026. The portion of existing Greenbank crossing the Jock River will be converted to a multi-use pathway. South of the Jock River, it will be renamed.

A new secondary school costing $77.7 million will start construction on Cambrian Road in Spring 2026. It is scheduled to open in September 2029.

=== Parks ===
- Black Raven Park
- Cappamore Park
- Celestial Park
- Dowitcher Park
- Elevation Park
- Flagstaff Park
- Freshwater Parkette
- Guinness Park
- Half Moon Bay Park
- Half Moon Bay District Park
- Regatta Park
- River Mist Park
- River Run Park
- Tucana Park
- Watercolours Park

=== Schools ===
==== Public English (OCDSB) ====
- Half Moon Bay Public School
- Wazoson Public School

==== Catholic English (OCSB) ====
- St. Benedict School
- St. Cecilia School
- St. Juan Diego School

==== Public French (CEPEO) ====
- École élémentaire publique Des Visionnaires

==== Catholic French (CECCE) ====
- École élémentaire catholique Sainte-Kateri

== See also ==
- Barrhaven
- List of neighbourhoods in Ottawa
