= Jan Harder =

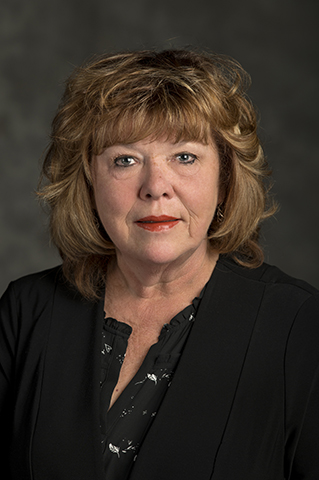

Ottawa City Councillor
- In office January 1, 2001 – November 15, 2022
- Preceded by: City amalgamated
- Succeeded by: David Hill
- Constituency: Bell-South Nepean Ward (2001-2006); Barrhaven Ward (2006-present)

Nepean City Councillor
- In office December 1, 1997 – January 1, 2001
- Preceded by: Doug Collins
- Succeeded by: City amalgamated
- Constituency: Barrhaven Ward

Personal details
- Born: 1951 (age 74–75) Ottawa
- Spouse: Larry Harding

Janet Harder (born 1951 in Ottawa) is a former Ottawa City Councillor who represented the ward of Barrhaven. She was the appointed chair of the Ottawa Public Library board, which sets policy and has the ultimate say in decisions affecting the library system.

== Career ==
Born at the Civic Hospital in Ottawa, to parents Philip and Blanche Weatherall (née Culhane) she spent her youth in a number of different Ontario cities. Trained as a radiological technician, she eventually became an executive in the grocery business.

She first entered politics in the 1997 municipal elections when she was elected to Nepean city council. Prior to her election, she served for eight years as the President of the Barrhaven Community Association. She ran on a platform of "fast-tracking urban development" in south Nepean, increasing the number of sports fields and ice rinks and improved commuter roads, transit and the building of a VIA rail station. She was easily elected to council, defeating rivals Mike Kronick and Bill Gordon with 55% of the vote.

With the creation of the new amalgamated city of Ottawa in 2000, Harder ran against regional councillor Molly McGoldrick-Larsen. While the race was expected to be close, Harder ended up winning by several thousand votes.

In 2003, Harder described youth gangs in her ward as "non-whites", which led to calls to her resignations and a hate crime complaint that did not lead to charges.

She was reelected in the 2003 Ottawa election, by defeating newcomer John R. Palmer.

One of her first efforts on city council was the successful campaign to replace the new coat of arms with that of the old city of Ottawa. She also led a campaign to have filters installed on computers in the public libraries that would restrict users from accessing pornography.

In the November 2006 municipal elections, Harder retained her position as councillor with 75% of the vote in Barrhaven Ward.

Harder was accused of conflict of interest in 2008 for allegedly endorsing a waste management company, Plasco, and accepting money in the form of a paid trip.

Harder is heavily active in Conservative politics and in the past mused about running federally in her riding.

Her daughter, Elena ran for the vacant Orléans Ward seat in a by-election in January 2006, but was unsuccessful.

Harder endorsed Ottawa mayor Jim Watson for mayor of Ottawa in the 2018 Ottawa municipal election.

In 2021, Harder came under controversy due to her connections with lobbyist Jack Stirling and the Stirling Group, as she regularly sought his advice on planning matters while under contracts with the Stirling Group related to her ward and her role as chair of the city's planning committee. In a 101-page report, Ottawa's integrity commissioner Robert Marleau recommended Harder lose her seat on the committee. Harder resigned her seat on the planning committee on June 23.
