= Strandherd Drive =

Major road in Barrhaven, Ottawa, Canada

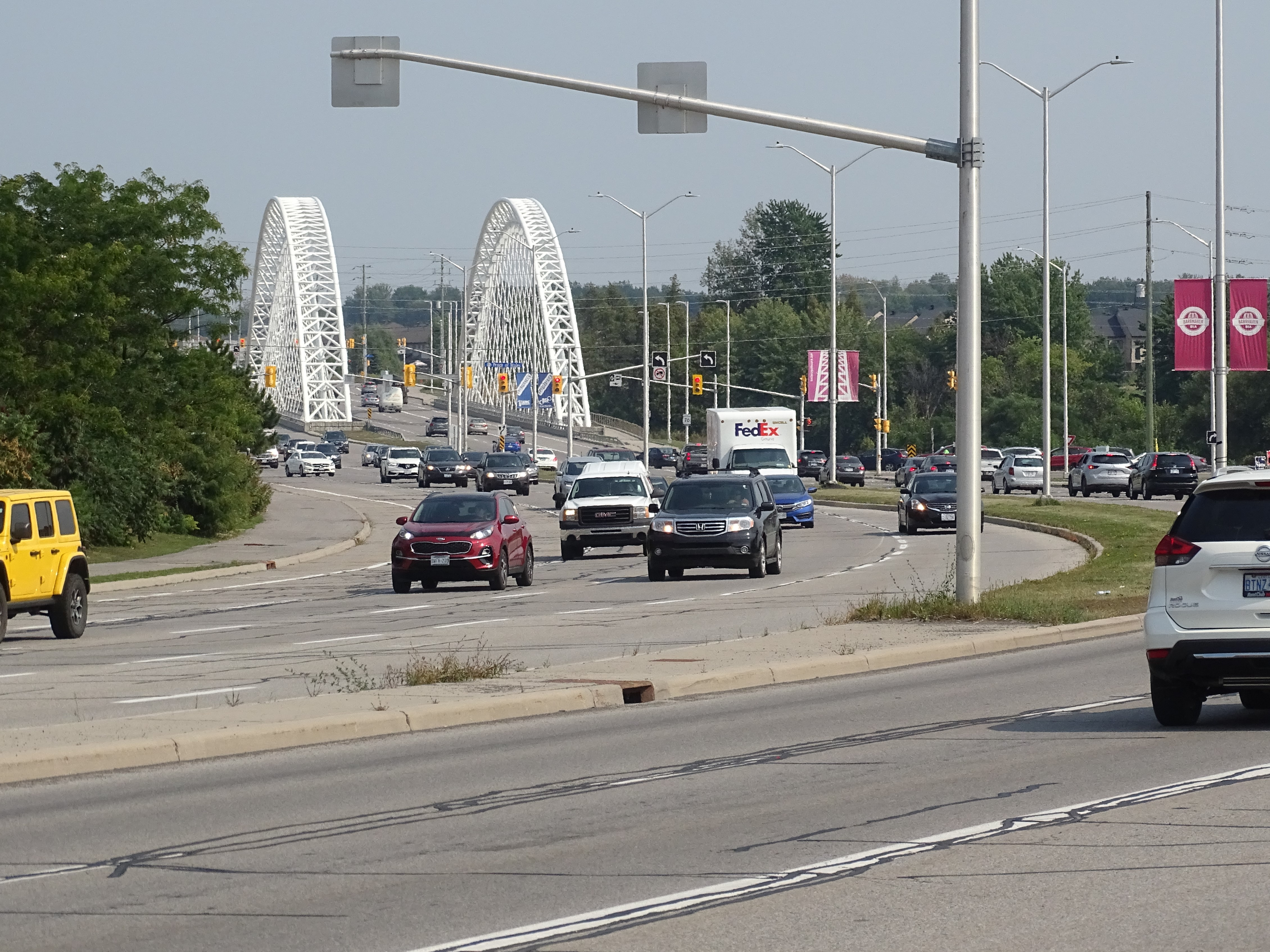
Strandherd Drive looking east from Cresthaven Drive

Strandherd Drive is a major road serving the community of Barrhaven in southwest Ottawa.

== Realignment and extension ==
Up until the mid-1990s, Strandherd Drive was an east-west coursing road extending from Moodie Drive to Woodroffe Avenue. With the introduction of Highway 416 and the growth of Longfields and Chapman Mills, Strandherd Drive has been realigned and has seen an increase in traffic.

Standherd Drive begins in the west at an intersection with Fallowfield Road near Highway 416 as a four-lane road. The original portion of the road from Moodie Drive to Cedarview Road has been renamed McKenna Casey Drive and sees little traffic. Heading to Jockvale Road, Strandherd is a high-speed road at 80 km/h (50 mph); further east, there is a significant commercial area surrounding the intersection with Greenbank Road. The original part of Strandherd that terminated at Woodroffe has been renamed Deerfox Drive, and the new, higher-speed arterial road that originally ended at Crestway Avenue just east of Woodroffe has been extended to Prince of Wales Drive and across the Rideau River.

Between 2020 and 2023, Strandherd Drive was widened between Maravista Drive and Jockvale Road, bringing it to four lanes over its entire length. A road bridge over the Via Rail line was also constructed in place of the original grade crossing.

== Vimy Memorial Bridge ==
Work to extend the road across the Rideau River by combining a road bridge to connect to another growing community, Riverside South took place in the early 2010s. This bridge connects Strandherd Drive to Earl Armstrong Road in Riverside South. Initial plans for the bridge included a Light Rail track as a part of an O-Train extension to Barrhaven, but this project was canceled in 2006. Ottawa City Council cited the Strandherd-Armstrong Bridge, soon renamed the Vimy Memorial Bridge, as one of the priority projects for the future as it would relieve pressure from the Hunt Club Bridge located further north. Delayed several times, the bridge was finished in July 2014. The federal government with in lead Nepean—Carleton MP Pierre Poilievre announced $35 million in funding for the project but the majority of the Ottawa City Council refused the funding as it was money coming from a previous $200-million Liberal government announcement in 2004 for the light-rail extension. Despite the cancellation, then President of the Treasury Board John Baird left the money available for future transit projects. The Ontario government refused to pledge money as it did not, after the light-rail cancellation, include a rapid-transit corridor or lane.
