= 2024 Ottawa stabbing =

Mass killing in Canada

- Location: 324 Berrigan Dr, Barrhaven, Ottawa, Ontario, Canada
- Date: March 6, 2024
- Attack type: Mass stabbing, mass murder
- Weapon: 38cm Hunting knife
- Deaths: 6
- Injuries: 1
- Accused: Febrio De-Zoysa

On March 6, 2024, the Wickramasinghe family, Sri Lankan immigrants, were fatally stabbed inside of their house in Barrhaven, a suburb of Ottawa, Ontario, Canada. Four children were killed, along with their mother, a male family friend and their father was injured. It was the worst mass killing in the city's recent history.

Febrio De-Zoysa, 19, a Sri Lankan former Algonquin College student residing with the family, was arrested in connection with the incident, and was charged with six counts of first-degree murder and one count of attempted murder. On November 6, 2025, De Zoysa pleaded guilty to four counts of first-degree murder and two counts of second-degree murder. The next day, he was sentenced to life imprisonment with no chance of parole for 25 years.

== Background ==
The seven victims were Sri Lankan immigrants. All except one were members of the same family; the remaining victim was a family acquaintance who was also living in the home. The surviving victim was the father of the family, while those killed included his wife and four children, aged seven, four, three years, and the youngest two months. The two oldest children were in grade two and junior kindergarten at Monsignor Paul Baxter School.

== Incident ==
Emergency responders received calls to 9-1-1 shortly before 11 p.m. on March 6, 2024. Authorities responded within several minutes.

== Investigation ==
Police reported not having any previous interactions with the suspect or the victims.

The student arrested in connection with the event appeared in court on the afternoon of March 7.

== Reactions ==
Mark Sutcliffe, the mayor of Ottawa, called the event "one of the most shocking incidents of violence in our city's history." Prime Minister Justin Trudeau called the event a "terrible violence".

A memorial was set up in Palmadeo Park, close to the location of the event.

== See also ==
- 2022 Saskatchewan stabbings
