= Westgate Shopping Centre (Ottawa) =

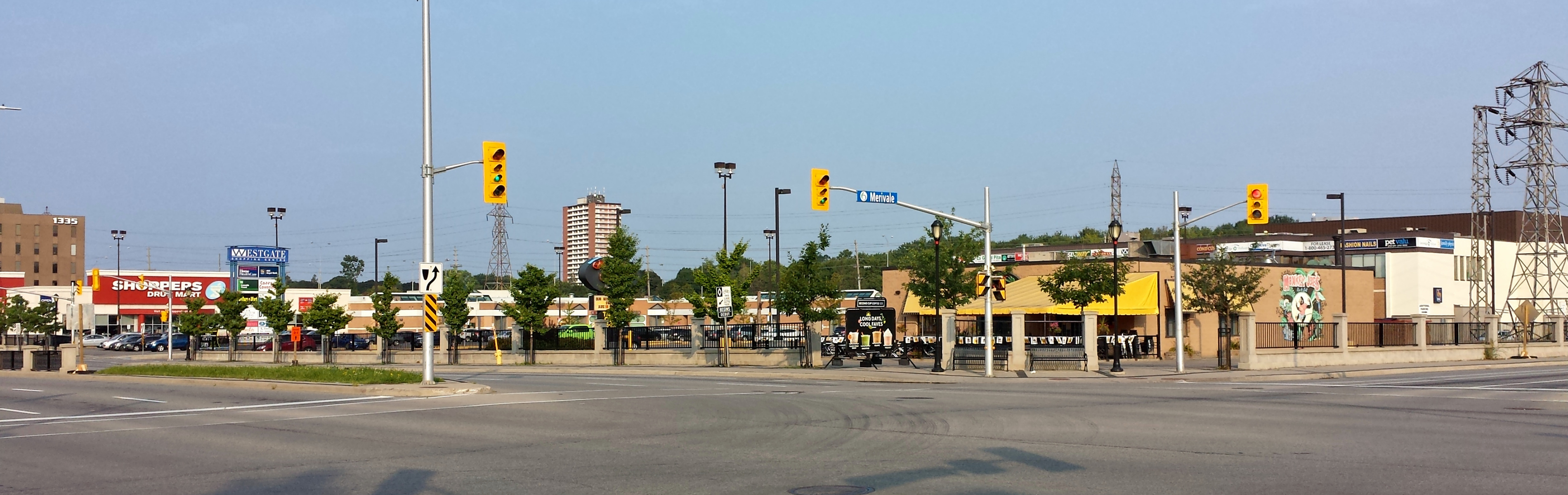
- Westgate Shopping Centre as seen from the Carling Avenue and Merivale Road intersection
- Coordinates: 45°23′13″N 75°44′08″W
- Owner: RioCan
- Public transit: Carling Avenue

Westgate Shopping Centre was a shopping mall in the Carlington neighbourhood of Ottawa, Ontario, Canada. It was located southwest of downtown, bordering Carling Avenue, Merivale Road, and Highway 417, owned by RioCan Real Estate Investment Trust.

The mall opened at 1309 Carling Avenue on May 12, 1955, and was considered Ottawa's first shopping centre. The anchor of the mall was Freiman's department store, owned by Lawrence Freiman who already had a department store on Rideau Street. In advertising for its grand opening, Westgate boasted it had parking for over 1200 cars, weather-protected shopping and music for its customers. Other stores included Steinberg's, Tip Top Tailors, a movie theater, Reitmans, Kiddytown and a branch of Royal Bank of Canada. The mall hosted a Blockbuster video store until September 30, 2011 which was known for having a heavy handed ID policy. The Royal Bank was the last remaining original tenant, before closing in 2022.

A proposed redevelopment plans to have the mall demolished and replaced in phases with high-rise commercial and residential buildings. The first phase began in November 2019 with the demolition of Monkey Joe's Restaurant on the south-east corner of the property. All remaining stores in the mall, except current anchor tenant Shoppers Drug Mart, closed on October 31, 2025.

Demolition of the property began in April 2026, and is expected to be completed by June 2026.
