= Stephen Collins House =

Historic house in Ottawa, Ontario, Canada

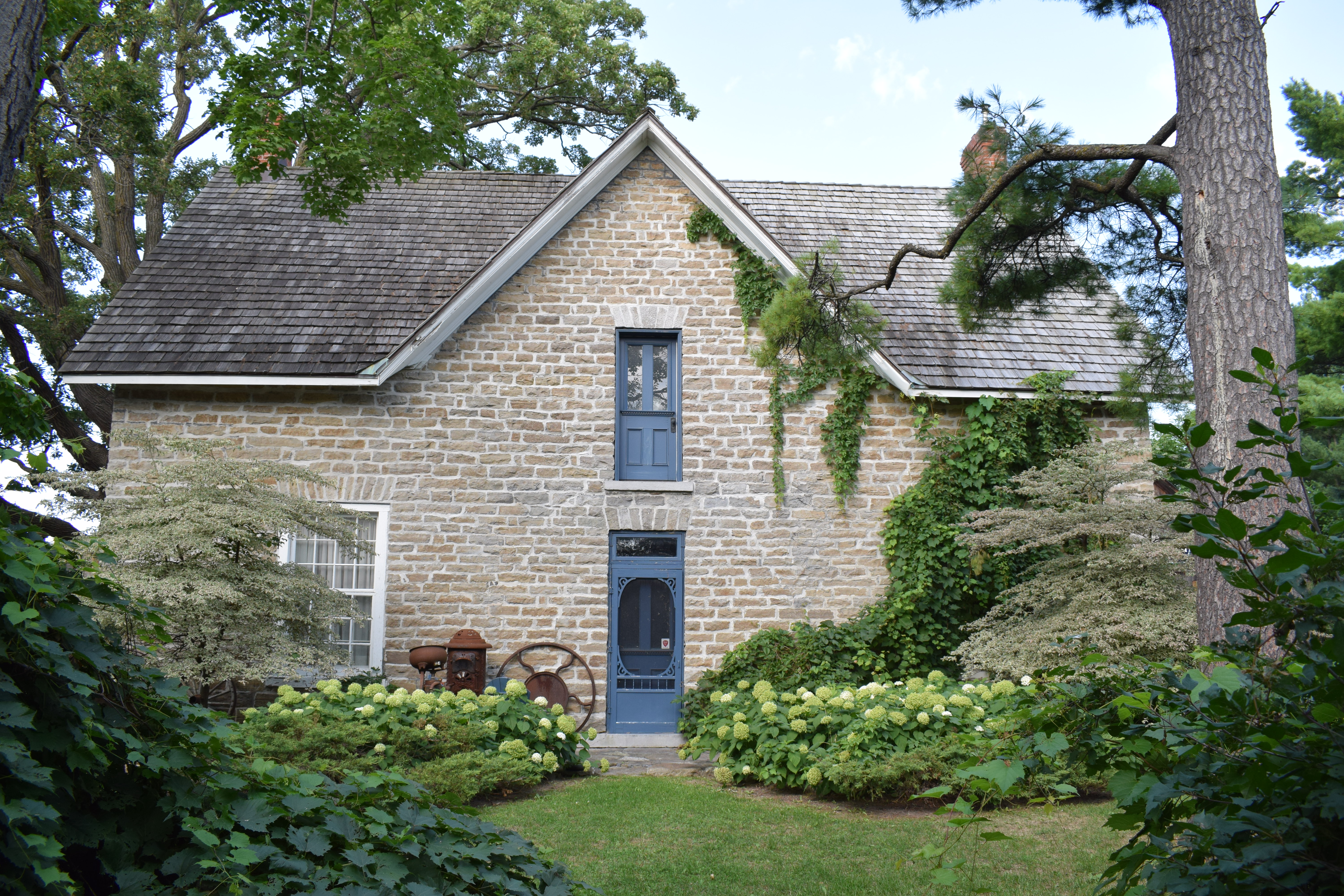
- The Stephen Collins House in 2020
- Interactive map of Stephen Collins House
- Type: Historic house
- Location: 3436 Prince of Wales Drive, Ottawa, Ontario
- Coordinates: 45.27195°N 75.70517°W
- Built: c. 1830
- Owner: Private residence

Ontario Heritage Act
- Designated: 1988

The Stephen Collins House is a historic house in the Nepean district of Ottawa. Built c. 1830, it is designated as a historic property under the Part IV of the Ontario Heritage Act and is listed by Heritage Ottawa.

== Architecture ==
The house was built as a one-and-a-half storey structure that faces the Rideau River. Its masonry walls are rubble stone with dressed stones on the corners.

== History ==
The building was built c. 1830 by Thomas Moodie, who was a stonemason involved with building the Rideau Canal. The house initially served as a house for the canal paymaster. It was later bought by loyalist Captain Stephen Collins, a veteran of the Grenville Militia in the War of 1812. Collins and his descendants resided in the house until 1884, when it was sold to James Mansfield of Perth, Ontario. The Mansfield family lived in the house until 1958, after which it was rented to various tenants.

In the late 1960s and early 1970s, the house was briefly a tea room and restaurant called Hamilton's serving Canadian and Japanese cuisine. In 1988, the Collins house was nominated for a heritage designation and described by the nominators as a "central-gabled stone house [whose] masonry consists of both squared rubble [stone] laid in courses and random rubble” with later-added "gingerbread trim, a front porch and a balcony."

In 2000, plans were made by the local development agency to demolish the house as part of suburban development in the area. After opposition from Heritage Ottawa, the local authority suspended its plans. The house was sold to a private owner in 2005 and was renovated.
