= Wilson Lo =

Canadian politician

Ottawa City Councillor
- Incumbent
- Assumed office November 15, 2022
- Constituency: Barrhaven East Ward

Personal details
- Born: November 27, 1991 (age 34) Vancouver, British Columbia, Canada
- Spouse: Amelia Howell
- Education: Carleton University
- Occupation: Communications officer

Wilson Lo (born November 27, 1991) is a politician in Ottawa, Ontario, Canada. He is the city councillor for Barrhaven East Ward on Ottawa City Council, and is the first City Councillor of Chinese descent.

== Background ==
Lo was born in Vancouver to parents from Hong Kong, and grew up in Markham, Ontario. While in Markham, he attended St. Augustine Catholic High School. He moved to Ottawa in 2009 to attend Carleton University, where he received a degree in journalism.

Prior to being elected, Lo was a customer communications officer for OC Transpo. He was formerly an OC Transpo driver.

== Politics ==
Lo was elected to city council in the 2022 Ottawa municipal election, becoming the first councillor elected to represent the new ward of Barrhaven East. Lo also became the city's first-ever Chinese Canadian city councillor. Lo ran on a platform of widening Greenbank Road, Prince of Wales Drive, upgrading and adding pathways in the Greenbelt, restructuring transit service and making streets safer. He won 37% of the vote, defeating teacher Richard Garrick, and Ottawa Catholic School Board trustee Patrick Brennan, among others. During his campaign, he claimed to have canvassed all 17,006 homes in his ward.

== Electoral record ==
2022 Ottawa municipal election: Barrhaven East Ward
Candidate	Popular vote			Expenditures
Candidate	Votes	%	±%	Expenditures
Wilson Lo	4,403	36.82	–	
Richard Garrick	2,980	24.92	–	
Patrick Brennan	2,153	18.00	–	
Kathleen Caught	888	7.43	–	
Atiq Qureshi	778	6.51	–	
Guy Boone	516	4.32	–	
Dominik Janelle	240	2.01	–	
Total valid votes	11,958	97.66		
Total rejected, unmarked and declined votes	286	2.34		
Turnout	12,244	39.11		
Eligible voters	31,307			
Note: Candidate campaign colours are based on the prominent colour used in campaign items (signs, literature, etc.) and are used as a visual differentiation between candidates.
