= Riverside South, Ottawa =

Riverside South
- Community
- Location of Riverside South in Ottawa
- Coordinates: 45°16′54″N 75°41′00″W
- Country: Canada
- Province: Ontario
- Municipality: Ottawa
- Settled: 1996
- Amalgamation: 2001 (City of Ottawa)

Government
  - MP: Bruce Fanjoy
  - MPP: George Darouze
  - Councillor: Steve Desroches

Area
  - Total: 28.627 km^{2} (11.053 sq mi)
- Elevation: 90 m (300 ft)

Population (2021)
  - Total: 19,802
  - Density: 691.72/km^{2} (1,791.6/sq mi)
- Canada 2021 Census
- Time zone: UTC−5 (Eastern (EST))
  - Summer (DST): UTC−4 (EDT)
- Postal code: K1V, K4M
- Area codes: 613, 343
- Website: Riverside South Community Association

Riverside South is a suburban community in Gloucester-South Nepean Ward in the south end of the city of Ottawa, Ontario, Canada, just southwest of Ottawa Macdonald–Cartier International Airport. Prior to amalgamation in 2001, the area was located in the city of Gloucester. Its population, according to the Canada 2021 Census, was 19,802.

In the early 1990s, the area was mostly vacant with a few houses and some farms. The first homes in the community were built in 1996. Since then, there has been extensive housing development that seems to be growing at the pace of other major suburban communities in the region, such as Barrhaven, Kanata and Orléans.

Currently, most of the built up area of the community is limited to areas around River Road and Earl Armstrong Road, and just west of Limebank Road. It is planned that Riverside South will become a major community with south expansions closer to Manotick and to the east closer to Leitrim. According to the Riverside South Community Association, the boundaries will eventually be "Leitrim Road to the north, the Rideau River to the west, a line half-way between Earl Armstrong and Rideau Road to the south and Bowesville Road to the east. It is expected that the community will have a population of 24,920 by 2034.

The Riverside South community also includes the much older community of Honey Gables, which includes three streets on the west side of River Road. This community was first built c. 1950, and has been under pressure by the surrounding developments.

== Transportation ==
The future North-South Light-rail line was expected to serve the community by 2009 until its cancellation on December 14, 2006. Most rural bus routes are being upgraded and widened to cope with increasing traffic from the area. One notable problem area is Limebank Road, where major slowdowns occur during the morning as commuters rush towards the inner downtown core of the city. The Strandherd-Armstrong Bridge linking the community to Barrhaven was completed in 2014, though without the light-rail extension. On July 5, 2017, the City of Ottawa announced they would be looking into adjusting the previously planned Bowesville O-Train station to bring it closer to the community. It was then announced that Line 2 would be extended to Limebank Road to directly serve Riverside South. It officially began passenger service on January 6, 2025.

== Schools ==
Elementary:

- St. Jerome Catholic School
- Steve MacLean Public School
- École élémentaire catholique Bernard-Grandmaître
- École élémentaire catholique Jonathan-Pitre
- École élémentaire publique Michel-Dupuis

Secondary:

- Riverside South Secondary School
- St. Francis Xavier Catholic High School

Riverside South is the home to the only Ottawa area school with a balanced calendar. Students at L'école élémentaire catholique Bernard-Grandmaître will experience a summer vacation which is shortened by three weeks. Those three weeks will then be re-distributed throughout the school year giving the students and teachers a one-week Thanksgiving vacation, an additional week during the week of the Victoria Day holiday, and an additional week during March break. The balanced calendar was implemented to allow students and teachers more opportunities to unwind. The pilot project ended in 2010, and the school is running permanently on the balanced calendar. The results of the pilot project are being used to determine if other Ottawa schools will also transition to a balanced calendar.

== School Board Trustees ==
English Public - Jennifer Jennekens
French Public - Linda Savard
French Catholic - Chad Mariage
English Catholic - Spencer Warren
