= David Hill (Canadian politician) =

Canadian politician

Ottawa City Councillor
- Incumbent
- Assumed office November 15, 2022
- Preceded by: Jan Harder
- Constituency: Barrhaven West Ward

Personal details
- Born: 1977/1978
- Spouse: Tammie
- Children: 2
- Education: Royal Military College of Canada

Military service
- Branch/service: Canadian Army
- Years of service: June 1997 – 2021
- Rank: Lieutenant-Colonel
- Battles/wars: War in Afghanistan

David Hill is an Ottawa City Councillor representing the ward of Barrhaven West.

== Background ==
Hill is originally from Saskatchewan. He has spent the majority of his career as an infantry officer with the Canadian Army, being deployed in Afghanistan, Haiti and Lebanon. He also previously worked as a gold miner in Northern Ontario. Hill received an undergraduate degree in political economy from the Royal Military College of Canada, followed by a master's degree in government and institutional studies. He also sits on the board of the Barrhaven United Church.

== Politics ==
Hill was elected in the 2022 Ottawa municipal election, with over forty percent of the vote, defeating lawyer Taayo Simmonds, and OC Transpo program manager Jay Chadha. Hill received an endorsement from former Nepean councillor Doug Collins. His campaign placed particular emphasis on roads and traffic management. During his campaign, Hill encountered notable controversy. Specifically, he was captured on video removing a piece of rival candidate Taayo Simmonds' campaign literature from a resident's door and throwing it to the ground. Hill apologized for the incident, describing it as a lapse in judgement.

== Electoral record ==
2022 Ottawa municipal election: Barrhaven West Ward
Candidate	Popular vote			Expenditures
Candidate	Votes	%	±%	Expenditures
David Hill	6,230	43.97	–	
Taayo Simmonds	4,737	33.43	–	
Jay Chadha	2,200	15.53	–	
Sadaf Ebrahim	1,001	7.07	–	
Total valid votes	14,168	98.35		
Total rejected, unmarked and declined votes	238	1.65		
Turnout	14,406	45.81	+3.10	
Eligible voters	31,446			
Note: Candidate campaign colours are based on the prominent colour used in campaign items (signs, literature, etc.) and are used as a visual differentiation between candidates.
