= Stonebridge, Ottawa =

Stonebridge
- Neighbourhood
- Location of Stonebridge in Ottawa
- Coordinates: 45.2597°N 75.7246°W
- Country: Canada
- Province: Ontario
- City: Ottawa
- Proposed: 1989
- Planned: 1997
- Constructed: 2000
- Highest elevation: 102 m (335 ft)
- Lowest elevation: 79 m (259 ft)

Population
  - Total: 9,371
- Forward sortation area: K2J
- Area code(s): Area codes 613, 343, and 753

Stonebridge is a master-planned golf course community in Ottawa, Ontario, Canada, located in the Barrhaven West Ward, bordering the community of Half Moon Bay. Its population as of the 2021 Canadian Census was 9,371. Main through-roads include Greenbank Road, Longfields Drive, and Cambrian Road.

== Geography ==
The community borders the Jock River to the north, Prince of Wales Drive to the east, Barnsdale to the south, Greenbank and Longfields to the west. (Note: North of Cambrian Road and west of Longfields is in the community of Half Moon Bay.) In the golf courses, the maximum elevation is 102 m, and the minimum elevation is 79 m. Southeast of the community is the town of Manotick.

Generally, older Stonebridge comprises that east of Longfields, where most development occurred in the early 2000s. West of Longfields, most development occurred in the late 2000s and early 2010s. However, a few new developments have sprung on Longfields, taking space from the prior golf courses.

== History ==
=== Construction ===
Construction of the area was originally proposed by Bruce MacNabb, who was a consultant for Monarch, in 1989, and had proposed for the areas development with the pre-amalgamation City of Nepean. Development of the area had been approved 8 years later in 1997 with the Area 7 Secondary Plan. Construction then began in 2000. Much of the older homes in Stonebridge today are constructed by Monarch, though some lots were sold to builders such as Cardel. Newer parts of Stonebridge have largely been built by Minto, Mattamy, and Uniform.

=== Infrastructure ===
==== Commercial ====
Stonebridge does not have many dedicated stores. Nukk Greenbank opened on August 27, 2022, on Greenbank, home to a few stores. Currently, the only major tenant which serves the Half Moon Bay-Stonebridge area is a Food Basics, which opened on October 30, 2025, on Cambrian.

=== Events ===
In July 2019, residents of Stonebridge voted in favour of a levy, to be paid by residents, to purchase golf course land owned by Mattamy Homes. The levy will stall any further development of homes on golf course land for an additional ten to fifteen years.

== Transportation ==
The majority of people in Stonebridge drive due to its suburban nature and relative lack of alternative transportation methods.

=== OC Transpo ===
Stonebridge is served by OC Transpo, with the 75 which goes along Longfields Drive, Cambrian Road, Kilbirnie Drive, and River Mist Road, terminating at Minto Recreation Complex. Connexion routes include the 275, serving the Half Moon Bay and Golflinks communities, and the 279, which briefly runs through on Longfields. There are many 600-series school routes served by OC Transpo in the area also.

== Character ==
Stonebridge has several parks, many including splash pads and fields. Major parks such as Kilbirnie Park and W.C. Levesque Park provide large fields and play structures for kids. Stonebridge Trail provides a 24-acre walking trail running along Jock River and wildlife watching for the community. A city-run community centre, the Minto Recreation Complex, is located on the Greenbank/Cambrian intersection, being a key centrepiece of the both Half Moon Bay, a nearby neighborhood, and Stonebridge, and is visible from many places such as the nearby Half Moon Bay Park. The complex includes a gymnasium, a weight and exercise room, two pools, two skating rinks, a walking track, and several multi-use rooms. There is also a CFL-sized artificial playing football field to the south-east of the building called the Quinn's Pointe Field, which borders Ottawa Fire Station 47.

The Stonebridge Golf Club, an 18-hole course, snakes through the community, and borders Longfields Drive. The Stonebridge Community Association manages community events including summer and winter sports for children.
