= Barrhaven =

- Suburb
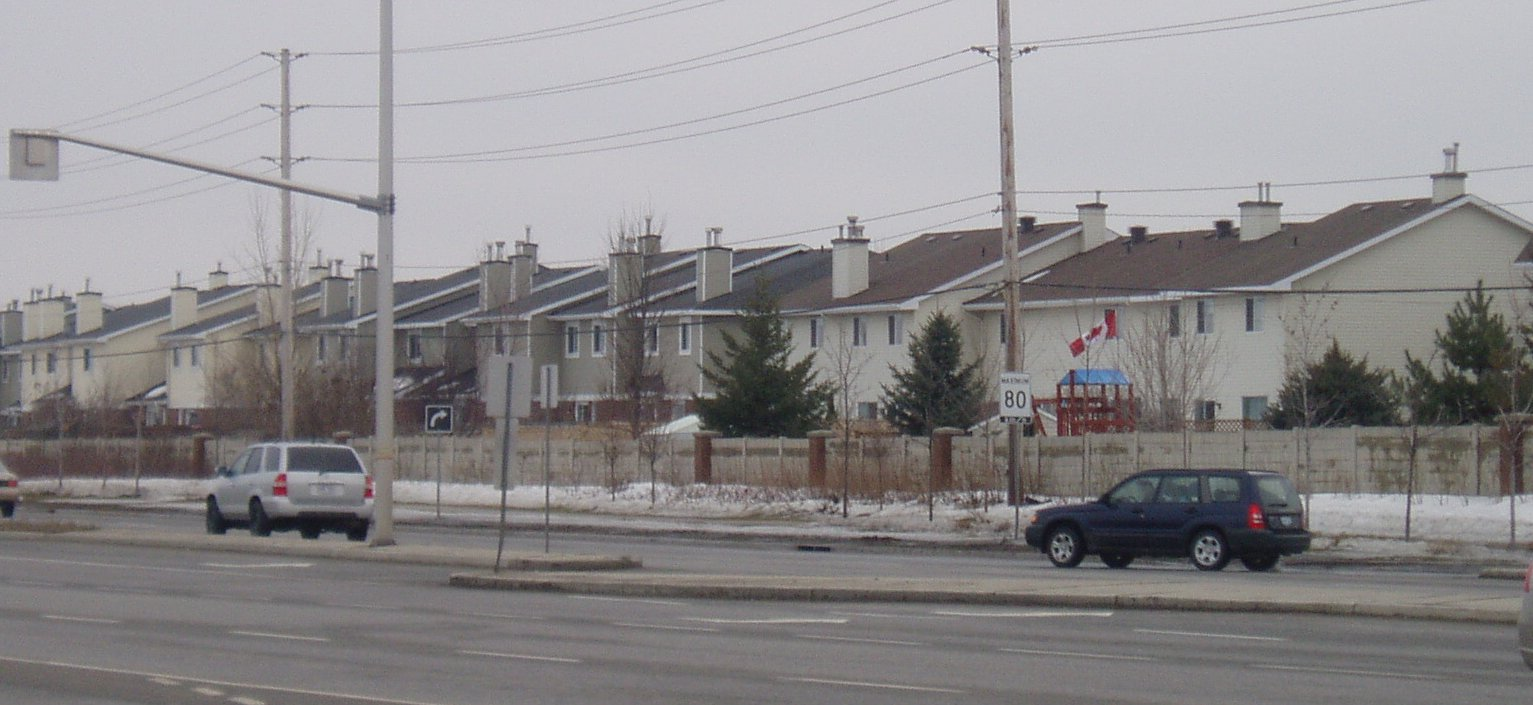
- A group of homes in Barrhaven on Woodroffe Avenue, between Fallowfield Road and Earl Mulligan Drive

- Location of Barrhaven in Ottawa
- Coordinates: 45°16′30″N 75°45′00″W
- Country: Canada
- Province: Ontario
- City: Ottawa
- Established: 1968
- Incorporated: 1978
- Amalgamated: 2001

Government
  - Mayor: Mark Sutcliffe
  - City Councillors: David Hill; Wilson Lo
  - MPs: Mark Carney (L); Bruce Fanjoy (L)
  - MPPs: Tyler Watt (OLP); George Darouze (PC)

Area
  - Total: 42.93 km^{2} (16.58 sq mi)
- Elevation: 100 m (330 ft)

Population (2021)
  - Total: 103,234
  - Density: 2,404.7/km^{2} (6,228/sq mi)
- Time zone: UTC−5 (EST)
  - Summer (DST): UTC−4 (EDT)
- Forward sortation area: K2G, K2J
- Area code(s): Area codes 613, 343, and 753

Barrhaven is a suburb of Ottawa, Ontario, Canada. It is located about 17 km (11 mi) southwest of the city's downtown core. Prior to amalgamation with Ottawa in 2001, Barrhaven was part of the City of Nepean. Its population as of the 2021 Canadian census was 103,234.

== Geography ==
Barrhaven is approximately bounded to the north by the Greenbelt, to the east by the Rideau River, to the west by Highway 416, and to the south by the Half Moon Bay development along Cambrian Road south of the Jock River. The area is diagonally bisected by CN rail tracks. Barrhaven is surrounded by rural areas and farmland, with the exception of the growing Riverside South area across the Rideau River. Directly south of Barrhaven is Manotick, a commuter town of the city.

Barrhaven is divided into several areas: Barrhaven proper or Old Barrhaven is the westernmost part of the neighbourhood, lying between Cedarview Road and Greenbank Road. New residential development is expanding the west side of Old Barrhaven between Cedarview and Strandherd Drive. Also included in this area is a triangle of land east of Greenbank between Fallowfield Road and the railway tracks known as Knollsbrook or The Triangle. South of this is the area known as Longfields, which stretches south to Strandherd and east to Woodroffe Avenue. Sandwiched between the railway tracks, Jockvale Road, Greenbank and Strandherd is the neighbourhood of Barrhaven on the Green. East of Woodroffe, next to the Rideau River, is the neighbourhood of Davidson Heights. South of Strandherd and east of Greenbank is a community known as Chapman Mills. As Prince of Wales Drive approaches Longfields Drive, there is a thriving community known as Stonebridge that is located beside the Stonebridge Golf & Country Club.

== History ==
=== Pre-urbanization ===
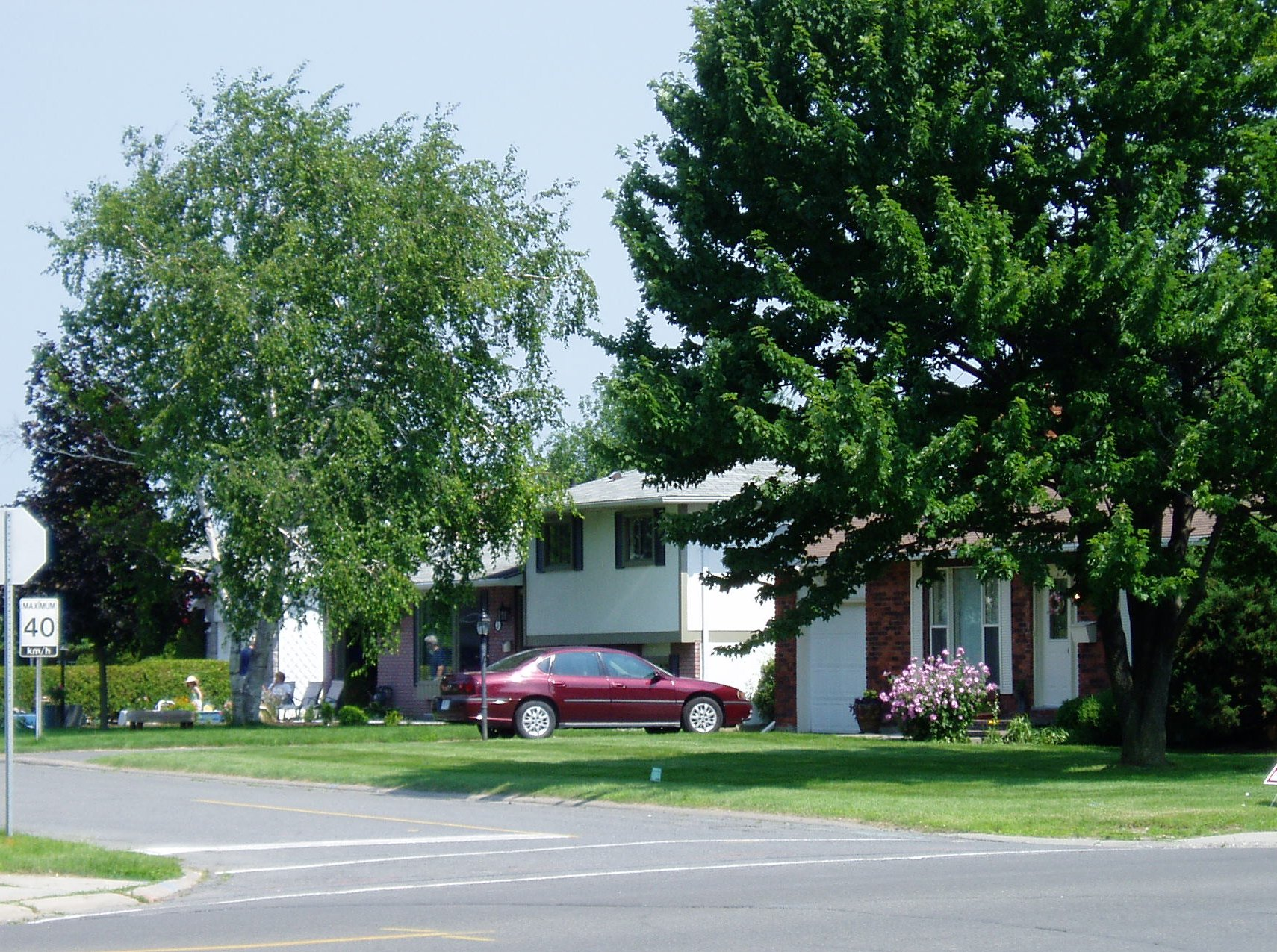
Initial subdivision houses along Larkin Drive built ca. late 1960s/early 1970s

The Barrhaven area was long inhabited by First Nations peoples, and the modern Jockvale Road follows an ancient path that was originally a trail through the wilderness. In the 19th century, the area became populated by colonial era farmers as the area was divided into a number of rural homesteads.

The Jockvale School House located at Jockvale and Strandherd was built in 1841. Today, the school stands as a historic site. In 1911, the Canadian Northern Railway built a rail line from Ottawa to Toronto through the area. Fast passenger service was offered for many years from Fallowfield Station (near the intersection of Strandherd Dr and Cedarview Rd) to Ottawa and beyond. After many years of absence, passenger rail service was reintroduced to the area by Via Rail in the fall of 2002 through a new Fallowfield Station located at the intersection of Fallowfield Road and Woodroffe Avenue.

=== Modern history ===
Modern Barrhaven was established in the 1960s, one of a group of new suburbs built outside the Greenbelt from the main city of Ottawa. Building in the area was begun by Mel Barr, for whom the community is named. Barr had originally purchased a 200-acre (0.81 km^{2}) farm with the intent of constructing a horse racing track. However, the Rideau Carleton Raceway was built further to the east, and Barr instead decided to develop his land for housing. In 1968-69, Barrhaven Public School opened as the first public school in Barrhaven.

Expansion in Barrhaven was approved by the Regional Municipality of Ottawa-Carleton in 1977, replacing development previously intended for Carlsbad Springs due to concerns about Leda clay in the soil. Following local consultation, the Ontario Municipal Board limited the planned expansion of Barrhaven in 1978, but this decision was overruled in 1979 by the provincial cabinet, leading to Barrhaven's ensuing growth.

=== Events ===
In 2024, Barrhaven was the site of the city's worst mass killing in its history when six people were killed with a bladed weapon.

== Character ==
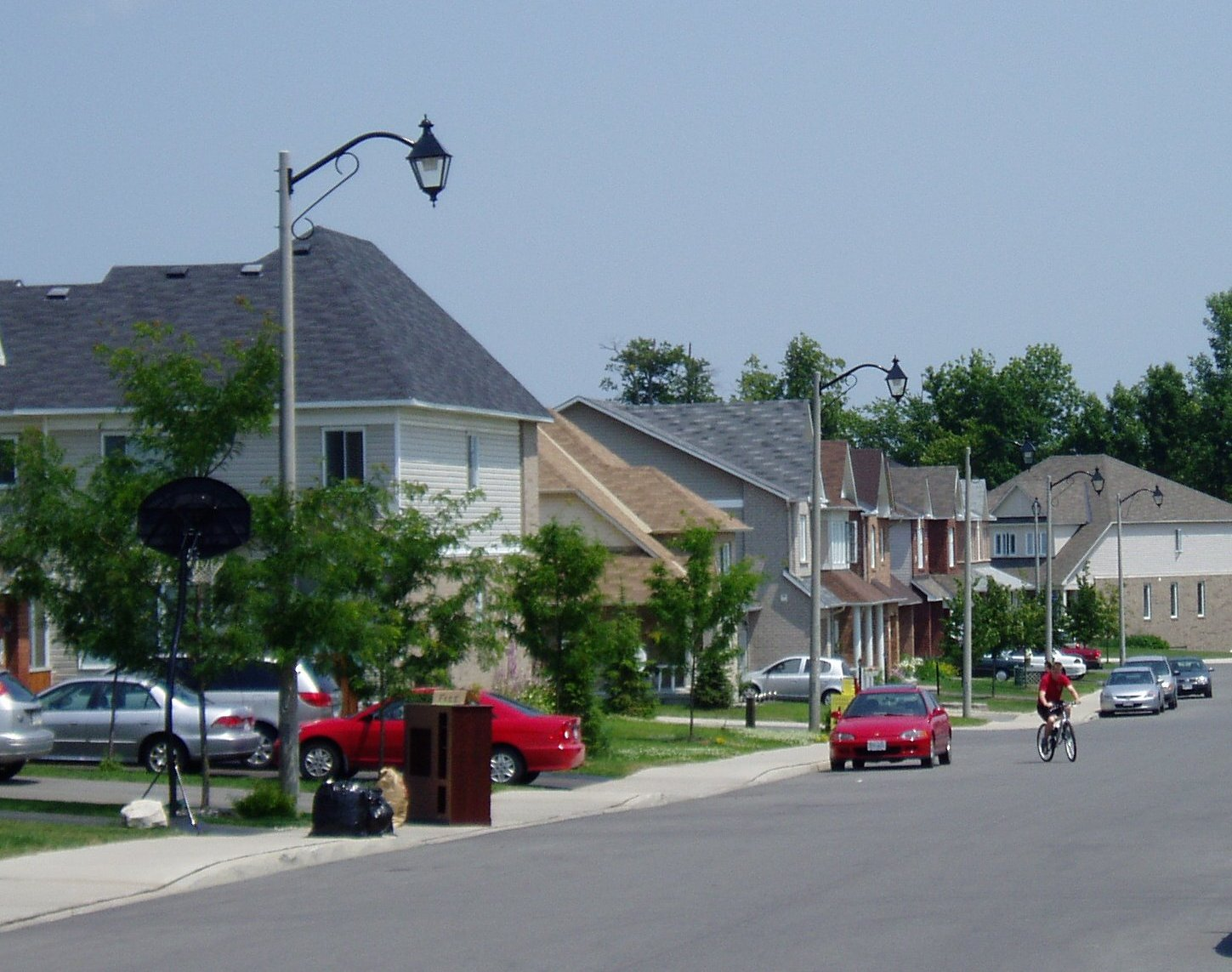
Davidson Heights section of Barrhaven

Like most North American suburbs built so quickly and so recently, Barrhaven has a very uniform feel. Most streets consist of town houses with some streets having comparatively large suburban houses. In the older parts of Barrhaven, the streets are curvilinear, never forming a grid as they do in older parts of Ottawa. Now largely hidden by trees near the Rideau River is a heritage building, presently a private residence, that was once known as Stephen Collins House, and briefly as the site of Hamilton's Restaurant. The area is very suburban and tends to attract families.

=== Neighbourhoods ===
Barrhaven is divided into many neighbourhoods, with names generally selected by developers.

- Barrhaven (also known as Old Barrhaven) west of Greenbank, south of Fallowfield, north of the rail tracks, and east northeast of Jockvale
- Strandherd Meadows, the infill development extending Old Barrhaven to Strandherd Drive
- Longfields, east of Greenbank Road, west of Woodroffe Avenue, south of Fallowfield Road and north of Strandherd Drive
- Davidson Heights, east of Woodroffe Avenue
- Havenlea, bounded by Crestway Drive, Leikin Drive, Prince of Wales and Cresthaven Drive
- Chapman Mills, bounded by Prince of Wales Dr to the south/east, Woodroffe Ave to the west, and Stoneway Dr to the north.
- Rideau Glen, along Prince of Wales Dr, Holborn Avenue, and Rideau Glen Drive, north of Winding Way
- Winding Way, east of Prince of Wales Drive
- Stonebridge, located between Jockvale Rd and Prince of Wales
- Half Moon Bay, new neighbourhood under development along Cambrian Road, west of Greenbank, east of Highway 416, south of the Jock River and north of Barnsdale Road
- Quinn's Pointe, new community in Half Moon Bay under development along Cambrian Road, west of Greenbank, north of Barnsdale Road
- Barrhaven Mews, new community under construction between Strandherd Road and the Jock River and west of Jockvale/Greenbank Roads
- Barrhaven On The Green, located between Jockvale Road, Greenbank Road, Strandherd Road, and the Rail tracks
- Heart's Desire, located along the Jock River, in between Jockvale Road and Woodroffe Avenue
- West Pointe Village, located between Cedarview Road, Fallowfield, Strandherd, and the rail tracks
- Pheasant Run, west of Larkin Drive, south of Fallowfield, north of Jockvale and east of Cedarview Road
- Fraservale, south and west of Jockvale, east of Cedarview and north of rail tracks
- Knollsbrook, west and north of rail tracks, south of Fallowfield and east of Greenbank.
- Havencourt, across from South Nepean Park, east of Greenbank between the transitway and Longfields Drive.
- Havencrest, east of the intersection of Strandherd and Fallowfield and North of Jockvale Road.

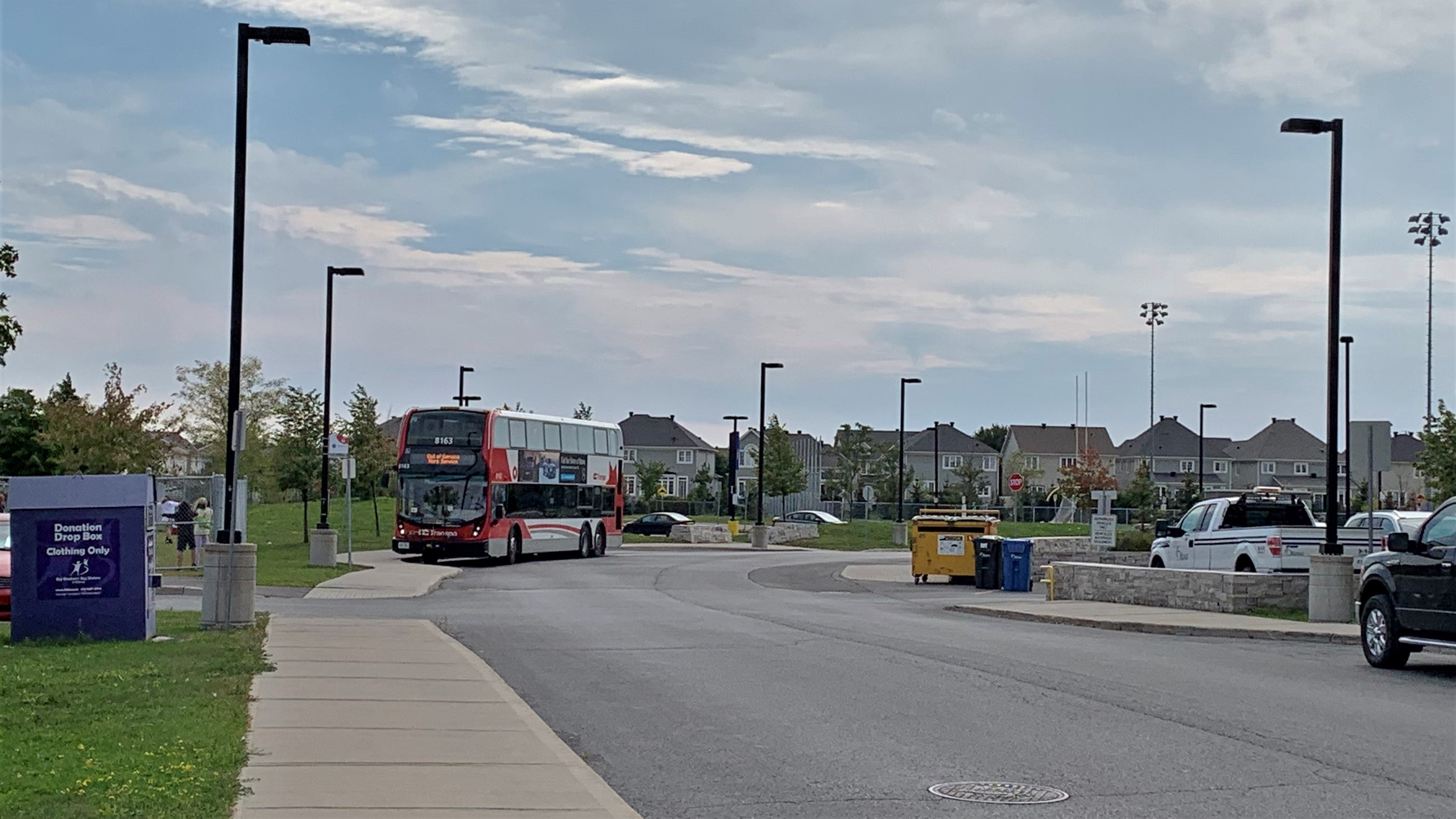
Cambrian Station at the Minto Recreation Complex in Stonebridge and Half Moon Bay

=== Features and amenities ===
Barrhaven contains several public and Catholic schools and numerous parks and playgrounds, mainly built since 2000. It is also home to the Walter Baker Sports Centre which contains a library and other facilities. The main commercial district, called the Chapman Mills Marketplace, surrounds the intersection of Strandherd Drive and Greenbank Road. It hosts a seven-screen cinema, and numerous stores. The Minto Recreation Complex, a new multi-use community centre at the corner of Cambrian and Greenbank, opened in 2014. A major employment district was established in 2015 in the area west of Strandherd Drive adjacent to Highway 416, known as the CitiGate corporate campus. Along with it, a large shopping centre came, with its major tenant being a Costco.

== Infrastructure ==
=== Transportation ===
Barrhaven is served by two bus rapid transit lines and is very near to the terminus of O-Train Line 2 at Limebank station. Several local buses run in Barrhaven, including routes 70, 73, 80, 99, 110, and 173. Routes 275, 277, and 279 only run during rush hour and (along with Transitway routes 74 and 75) connect to O-Train Line 1 at Tunney's Pasture station. There are many 600's series routes which serve the schools in the area as well.

Intercity Via Rail connections can be made at Fallowfield railway station to Montreal and Toronto.

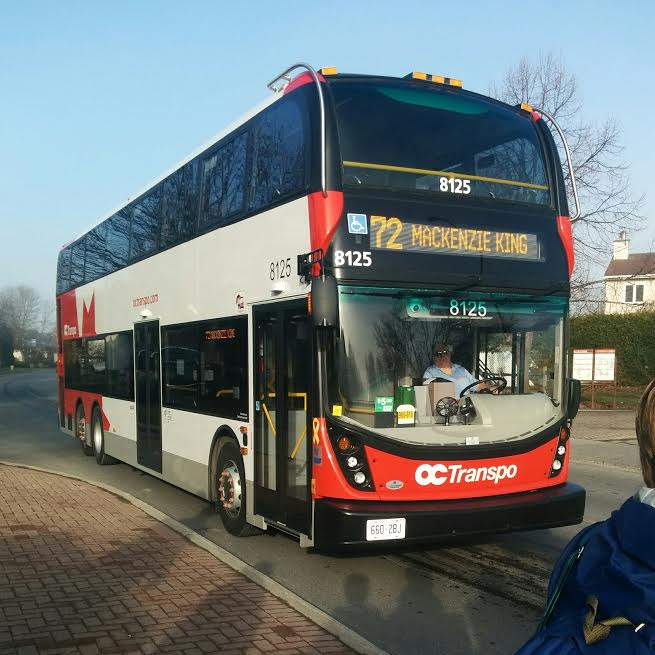
Route 72 Express Bus to Downtown Ottawa

Until 2006, it had been planned that the north–south light-rail O-Train (today's Line 2) would be extended to the centre of Barrhaven near Riocan Marketplace via Riverside South. The project was cancelled on December 14, 2006, by Ottawa City Council, which decided to focus on building rail-based rapid transit lines in the inner city instead. Rail-based rapid transit to Barrhaven is not expected to be introduced until after 2031, when the three lines in the inner city are expected to be completed.

On January 2, 2007, OC Transpo opened the Strandherd Transitway station and Park & Ride lot in Barrhaven. Directly across from the Chapman Mills Marketplace Wal-Mart & TD Bank, the facility has parking space for about 330 cars. It was built to help with overcrowding at the Fallowfield Station and meet the increased demand for park and ride spaces in the community. Rapid transit route 75 takes approximately 10 minutes to travel between Fallowfield Station and Strandherd Station, and 2 minutes between Strandherd Station and Barrhaven Centre Station. The Province of Ontario funded one-third of the $5 million cost.

In April 2011, the transitway (BRT) network was expanded in Barrhaven. One feature was the extension of Route 94 (now Route 74) to the intersection of Woodroffe and Strandherd. A new stretch of BRT was also constructed between Fallowfield and Strandherd to reduce travel times on Route 95 (Route 75 since 2019). In September 2014, a new BRT route was established on Chapman Mills Drive, using a graveyard median from the canceled south-western LRT route. Route 99 started at Barrhaven Centre and, using new Beatrice Station proceeded to Greenboro Station (the former O-Train Line 2 terminus) at non-peak hours via Riverside South (Vimy Memorial Bridge) and Leitrim Station. At peak hours, the 99 went all the way to Hurdman Station via the Southeast Transitway, connecting to the O-Train Line 1. Since the opening of O-Train Line 2's extension to Riverside South, route 99 has been truncated to end at Limebank station, Line 2's southern terminus, and had its frequency reduced.

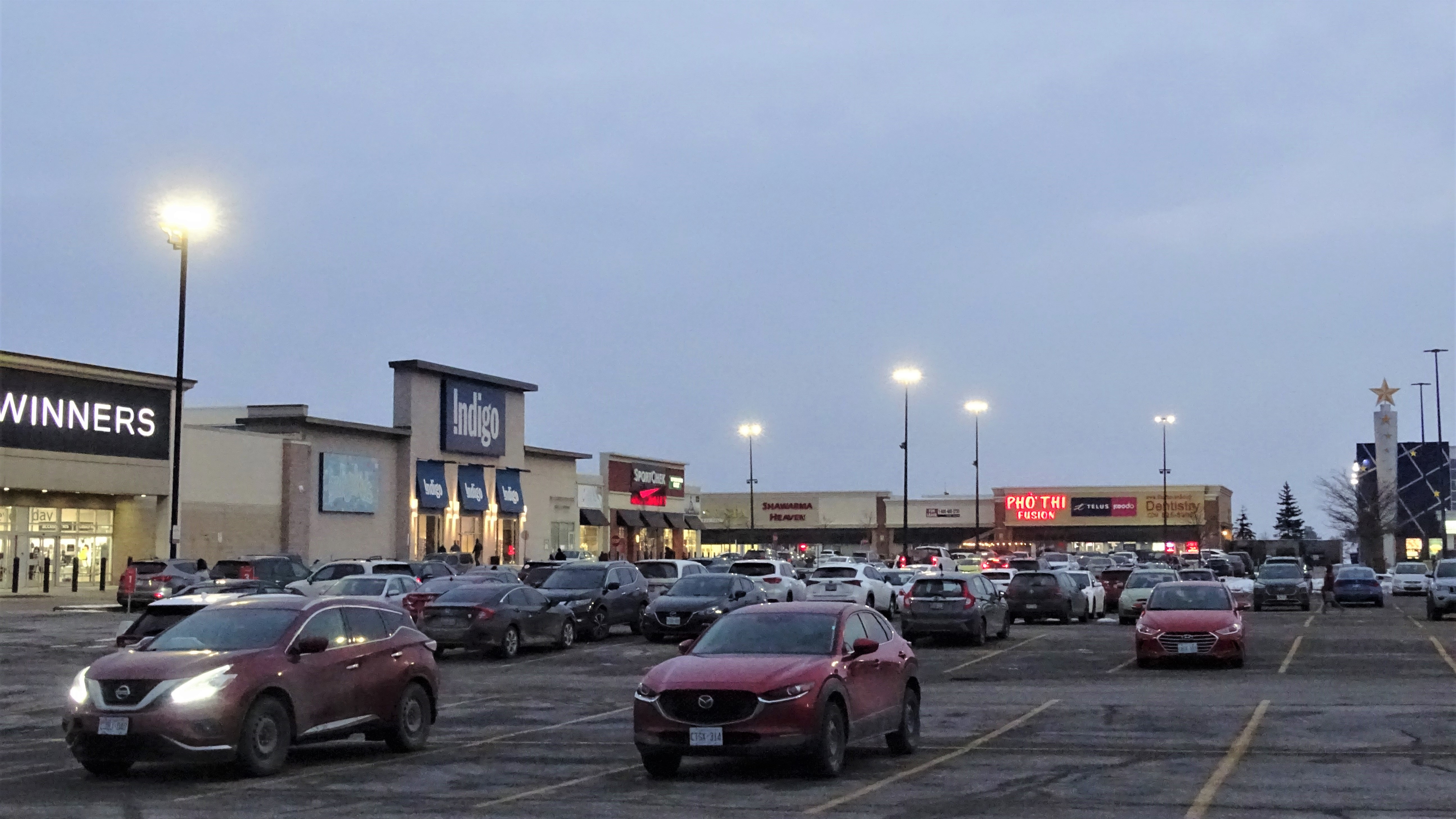
Chapman Mills Marketplace

=== Commercial centres ===
- Barrhaven Mall
- Barrhaven Town Centre
- Cambrian (Half Moon Bay, first tenant Food Basics opened in October 2025)
- Cedarview Square
- Chapman Mills Marketplace
- Trinity Common at CitiGate
- CitiGate Auto Park
- Cresthaven Crossing
- Longfields Square
- Strandherd Crossing
- Village at Strandherd Meadows
- Village Square

=== Parks ===
- List of parks in Barrhaven

=== Education ===
==== Public English Schools (OCDSB) ====
Elementary:

- Adrienne Clarkson Elementary School
- Barrhaven Public School (first school opened in Barrhaven in 1968)
- Berrigan Elementary School
- Chapman Mills Public School
- Farley Mowat Public School
- Half Moon Bay Public School (Opened September 2016)
- Jockvale Elementary School
- Mary Honeywell Elementary School
- Wazoson Public School (Opened January 2024)

Intermediate:

- Cedarview Middle School
- Longfields-Davidson Heights Secondary School

Secondary:

- John McCrae Secondary School
- Longfields-Davidson Heights Secondary School

==== Catholic English Schools (OCSB) ====
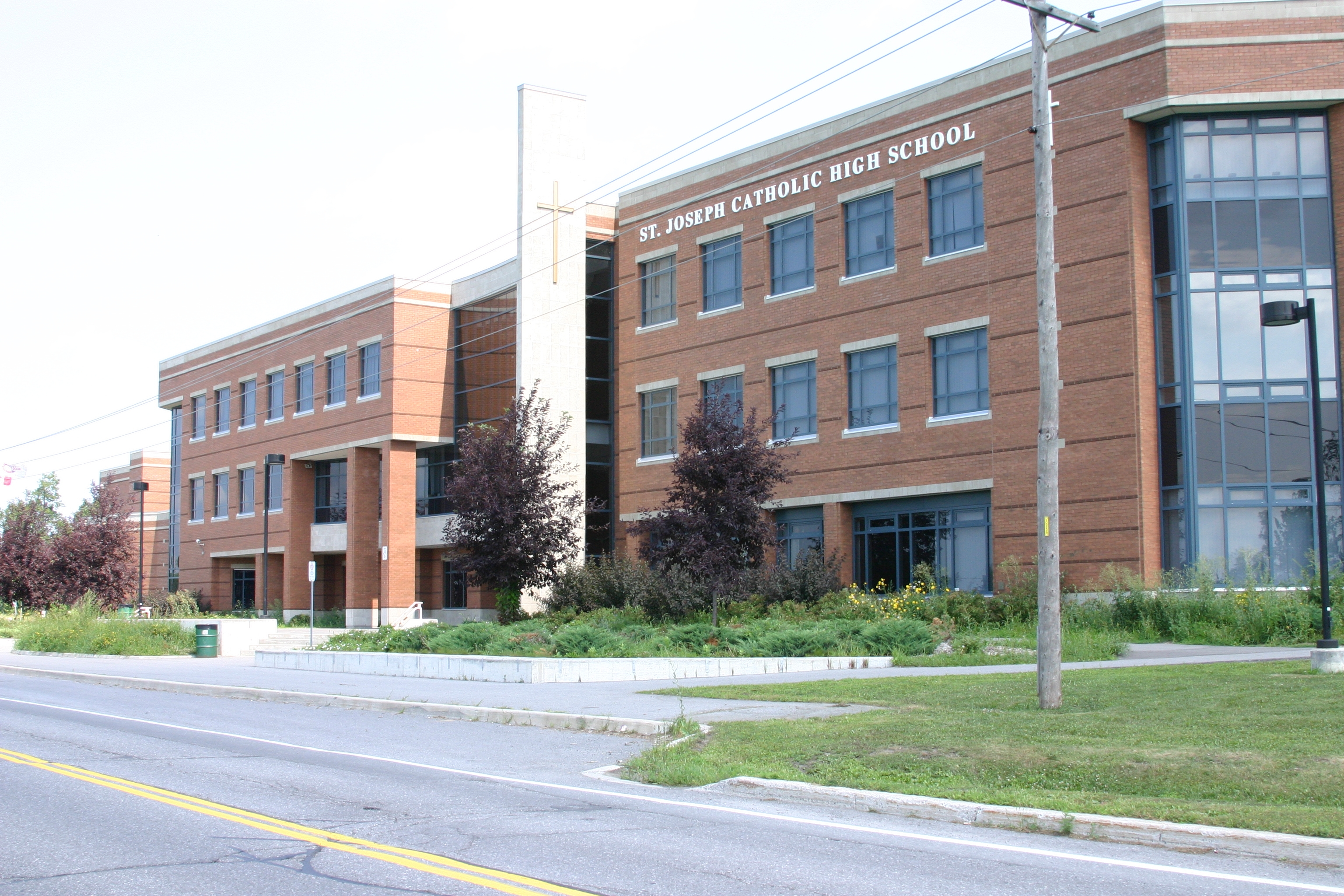
St Joseph Catholic High School, Barrhaven

Elementary:

- Monsignor Paul Baxter Catholic elementary school
- St. Elizabeth Ann Seton Catholic elementary school (opened February 1987)
- St. Cecilia Catholic elementary school
- St. Emily Catholic elementary school
- St. Luke Catholic elementary school
- St. Patrick Catholic elementary school (opened November 1978)
- St. Andrew Catholic elementary school
- St. Benedict Catholic elementary school
- St. Juan Diego Catholic elementary school

Secondary:

- St. Mother Teresa High School
- St. Joseph High School

==== French Public (CEPEO) ====
Elementary:

- École élémentaire publique Des Visionnaires
- École élémentaire publique Michaëlle Jean

Secondary:

- École secondaire publique Pierre-de-Blois

==== French Catholic (CECCE) ====
Elementary:

- L'école élémentaire catholique Jean-Robert Gauthier
- L'école élémentaire catholique Pierre Elliot Trudeau
- L'école élémentaire catholique Sainte-Kateri

Secondary:

- Collège catholique Franco-Ouest (served by bus)
- École secondaire catholique Pierre-Savard

==== Preschools ====
- Educara Montessori Child Care
- Little Scholars Montessori

==== Private schools ====
- Educara Montessori Child Care
- Little Scholars Montessori
- Ottawa Christian School

== Photos ==
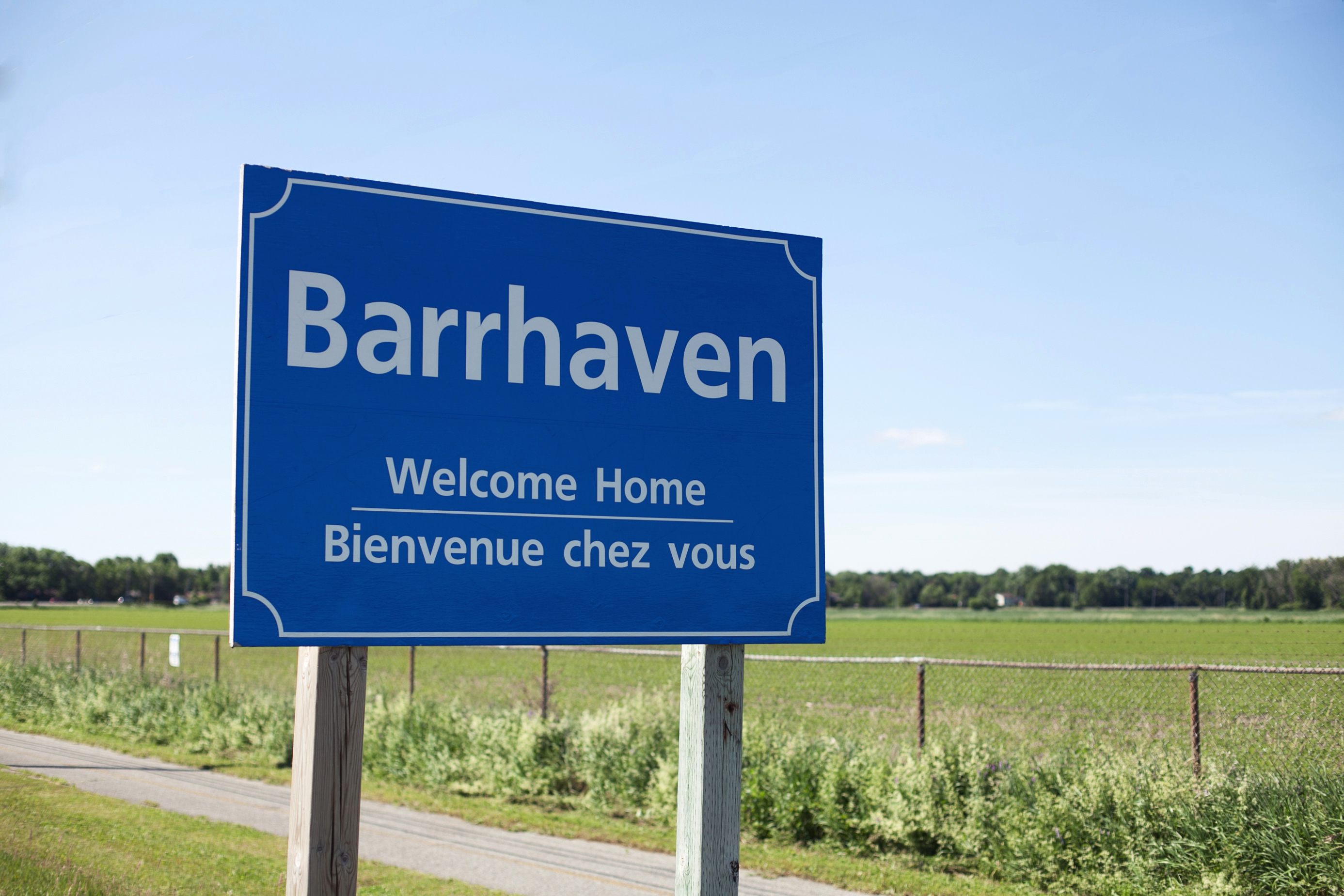
The welcome sign on Greenbank road entering Barrhaven

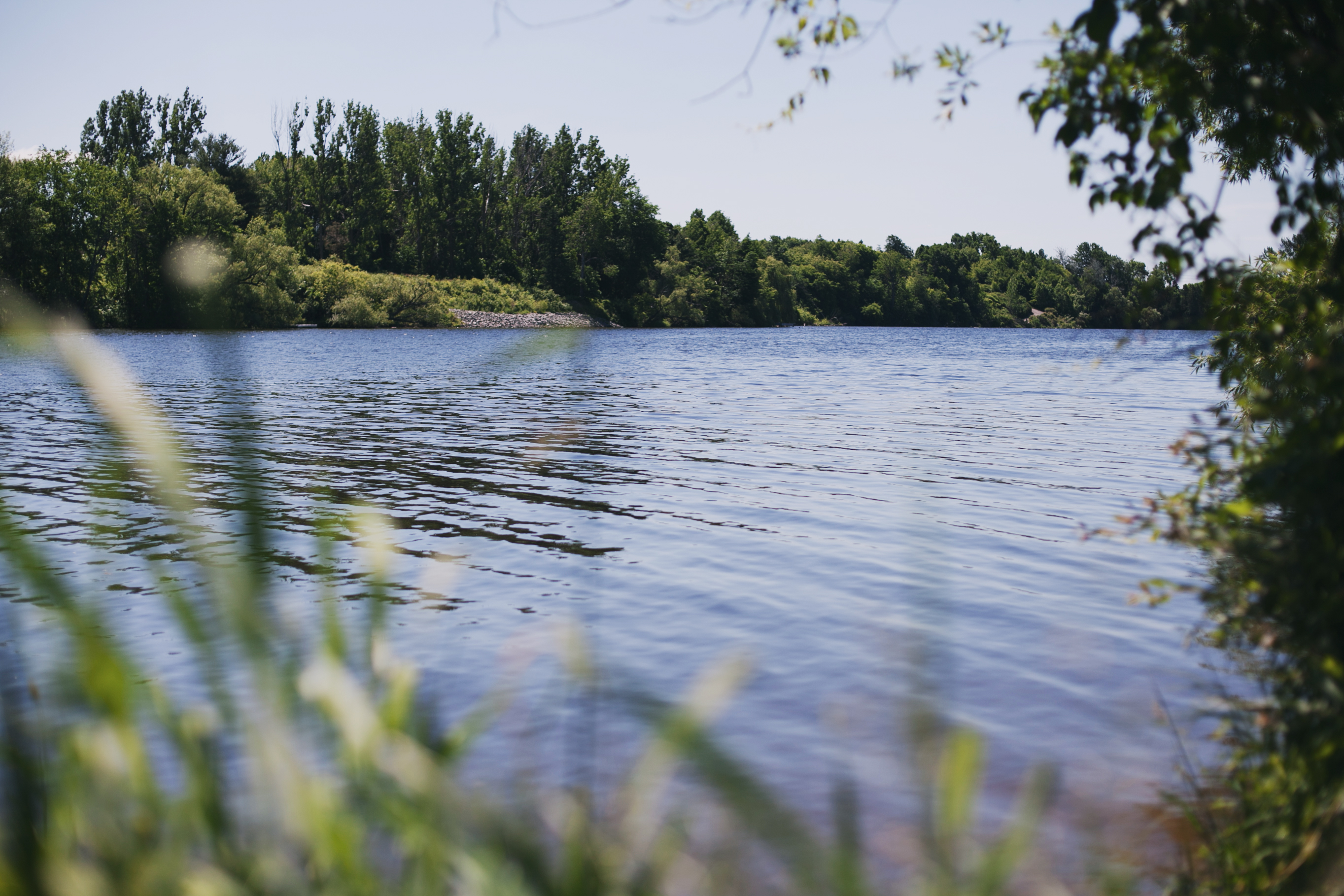
The Rideau river south of Barrhaven

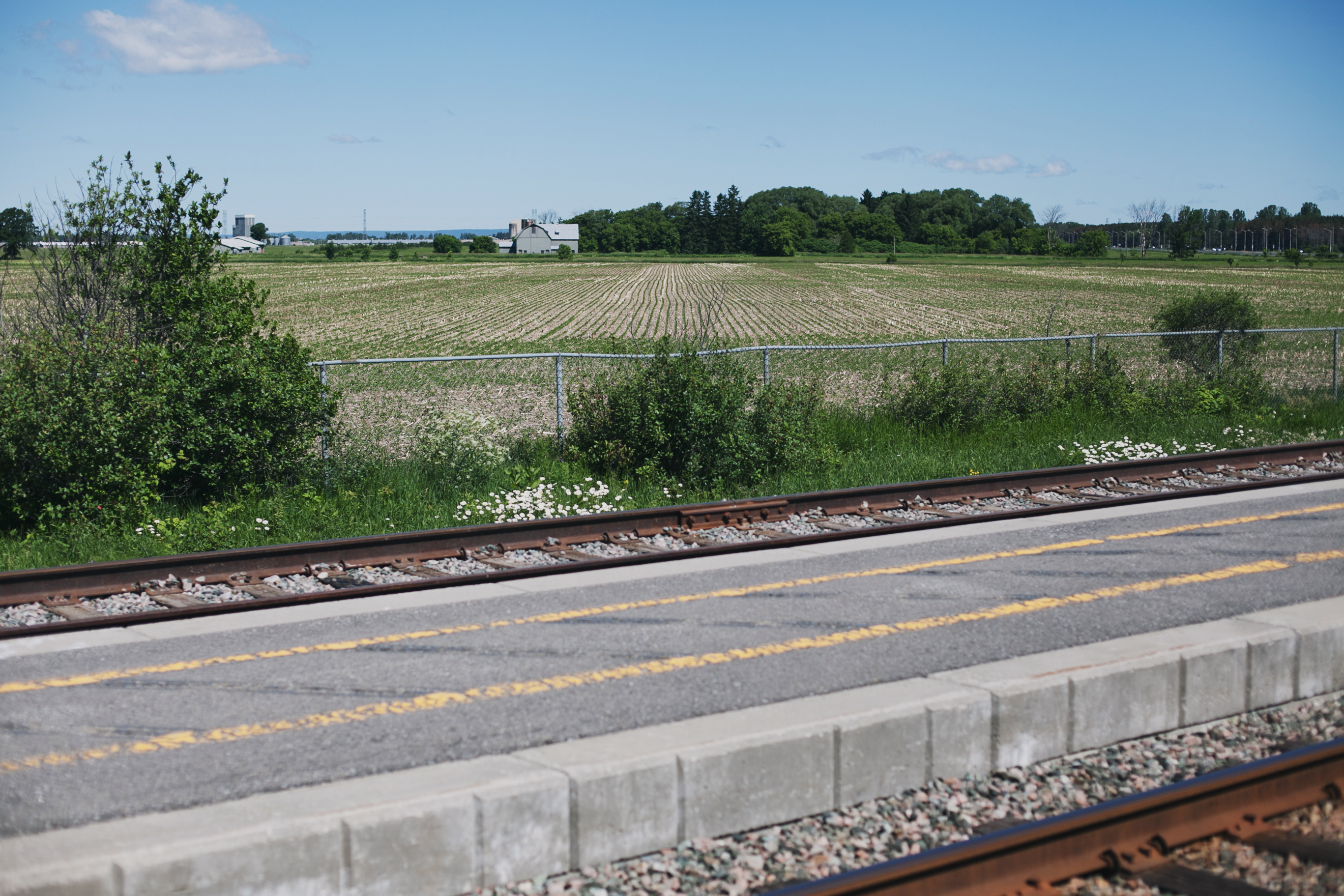
The railroad and farm on the north side of Barrhaven

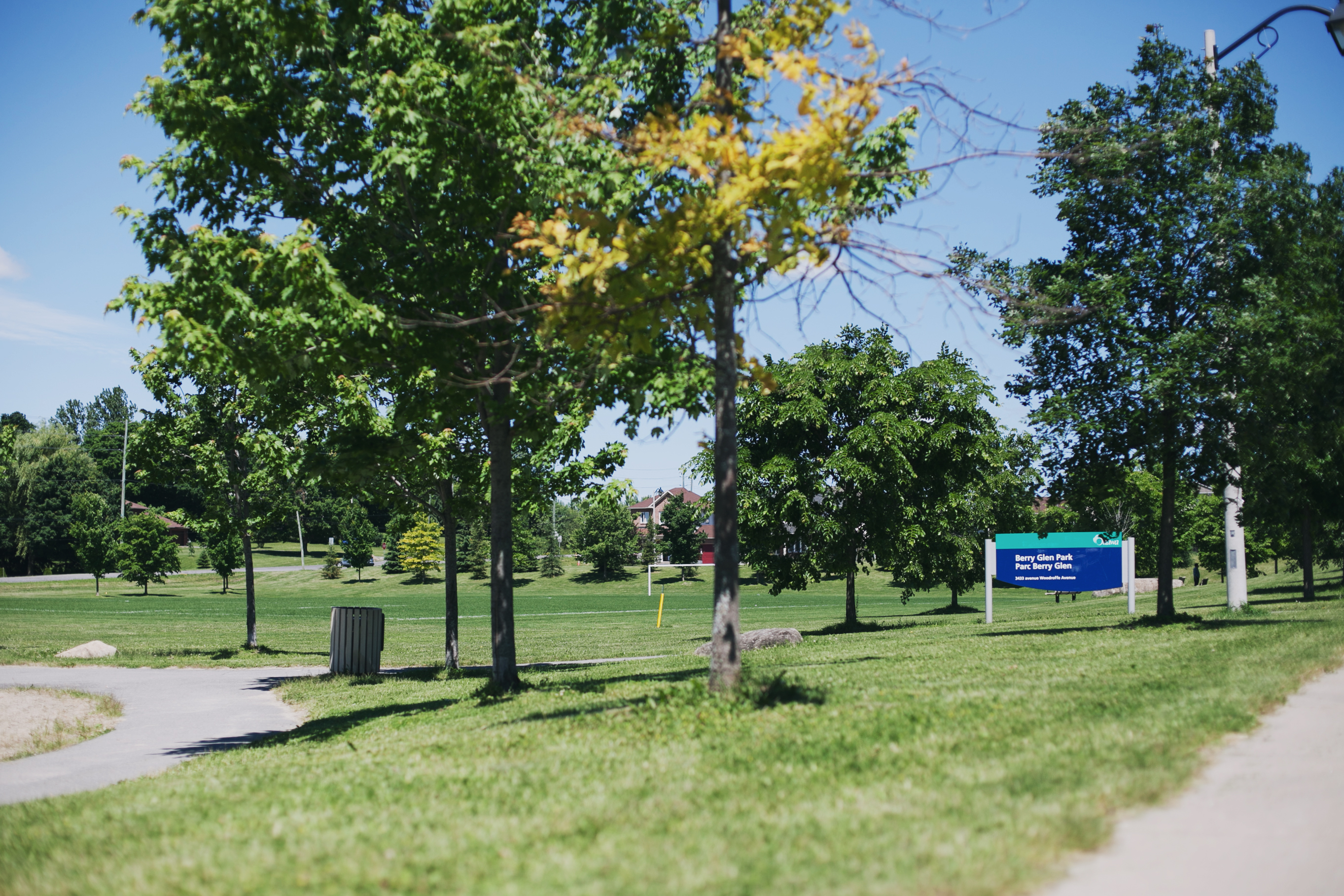
Berry Glen Park in East Barrhaven
