= Dow's Lake station =

Railway station in Ottawa, Ontario, Canada

Dow's Lake Lac Dow
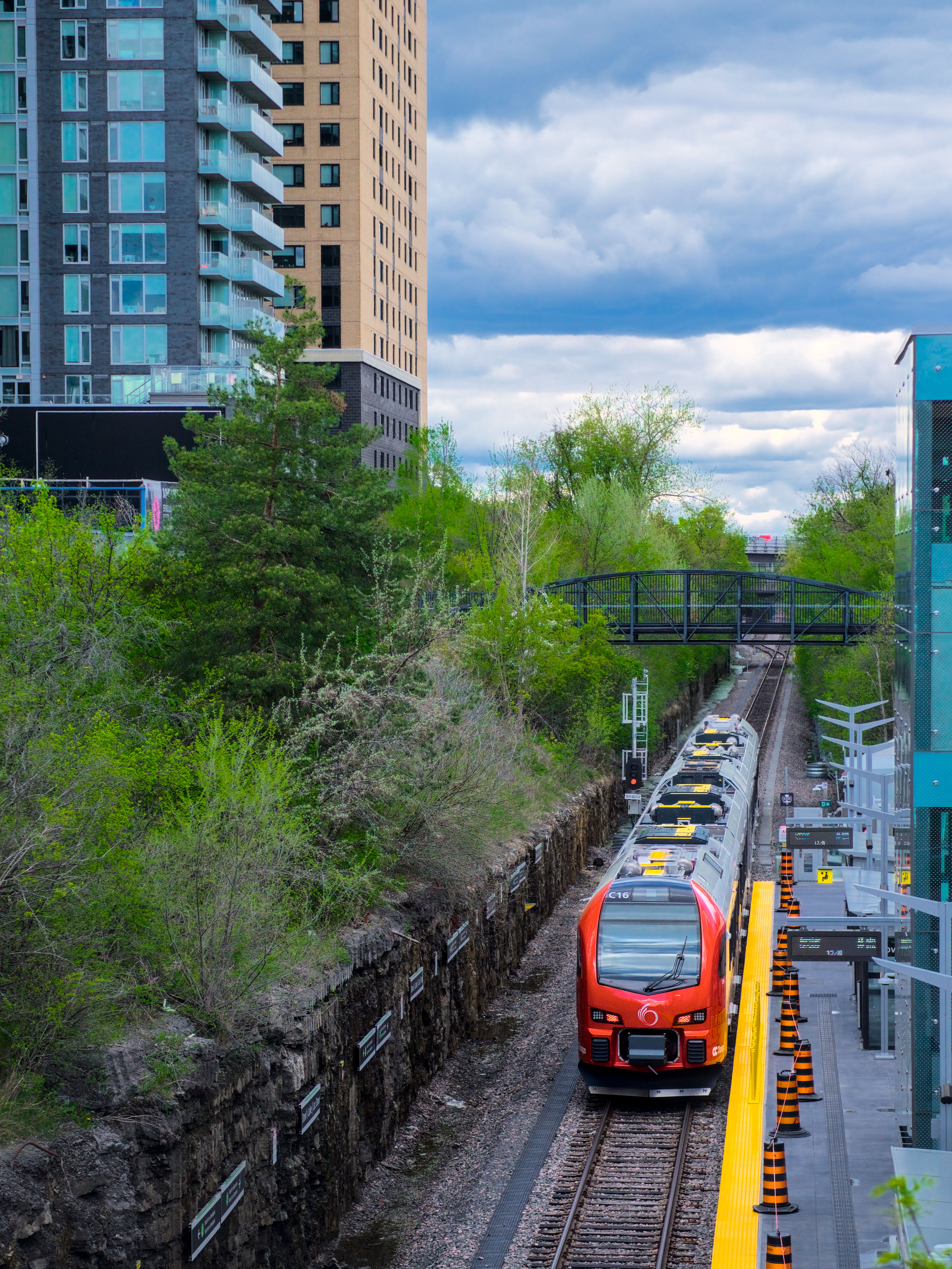

General information
- Coordinates: 45°23′51″N 75°42′34″W
- Owner: OC Transpo
- Platforms: Single platform
- Tracks: 1

Construction
- Structure type: Platform and track are below-grade with the station entrance at surface
- Parking: Yes
- Cycle facilities: Yes (20 sheltered, 20 regular)
- Accessible: Yes

History
- Opened: 2001
- Rebuilt: 2020–2025
- Former names: Carling (2001–2020)

Services
Preceding station	OC Transpo	Following station
Corso Italia toward Bayview	Line 2	Carleton toward Limebank
Location

Dow's Lake station (French: Station Lac Dow, formerly known as Carling station) is an O-Train station on Line 2, one block west of the intersection of Carling Avenue and Preston Street in Ottawa, Ontario. It is named after the nearby Dow's Lake, itself also the western terminus of the Rideau Canal skating rink during winters, as well as a key site during the Canadian Tulip Festival in May. The station is also near government offices at the area of Carling Avenue and Booth Street. South of Carling, the train enters a tunnel to pass under the Rideau Canal. The station was originally named for nearby Carling Avenue and Sir John Carling.

Along with the rest of the Trillium Line, the station closed on May 3, 2020, for the extension of the line and an upgrade of the station. The station re-opened on January 6, 2025.

== Facilities ==
- Accessibility: Yes - 1 elevator
- Washrooms: None
- Nearby: Dows Lake, Booth Street Complex (Natural Resources Canada)

== Service ==
Key
Line 1 (O-Train) Line 2 (O-Train) Line 4 (O-Train)	O-Train
E1	Shuttle Express
R1 R2 R4	O-Train replacement bus routes
N75	Night routes
40 12	Frequent routes
99 162	Local routes
275	Connexion routes
303	Shopper routes
405	Event routes
646	School routes
STO	Société de transport de l'Outaouais routes
Additional info: Line 1: Confederation Line; Line 2: Trillium Line; Line 4: Airport Link; Routes 5 to 199: Custom routing that that connects to Line 1 and/or 2; Routes 200 to 299: Connexion (peak-period only routes that connect to the O-Train); Routes 301 to 305: Shopper Routes (limited rural service); Routes 404 to 406: Canadian Tire Centre events; Routes 450 to 456: Lansdowne Park events; Routes 600 to 699: School Routes; Route R1: replaces Line 1 when it is out of service; Route R2: replaces Line 2 when it is out of service; Route R4: replaces Line 4 when it is out of service; Routes N39 to N98: night service (replaces Line 1 and N98 replaces Line 4); White backgrounds: limited service; Last two digits represent service area: 00s and 10s – Central; 20s – Gloucester; 30s – Orléans; 40s – Ottawa East; 50s – Ottawa West; 60s – Kanata, Stittsville; 70s – Barrhaven; 80s – Nepean; 90s – South Keys

The following routes serve Dow's Lake as of March 29th, 2025:

Stop	Routes
O-Train (North/South)	Line 2 (O-Train)
A #8014 Carling Ave. West	56 85
B #7369 Carling Ave. East	56 85
C #6655 Preston St. South	R2 8 (Summer weekends only)
D #6657 Preston St. North	R2 8

== Gallery ==
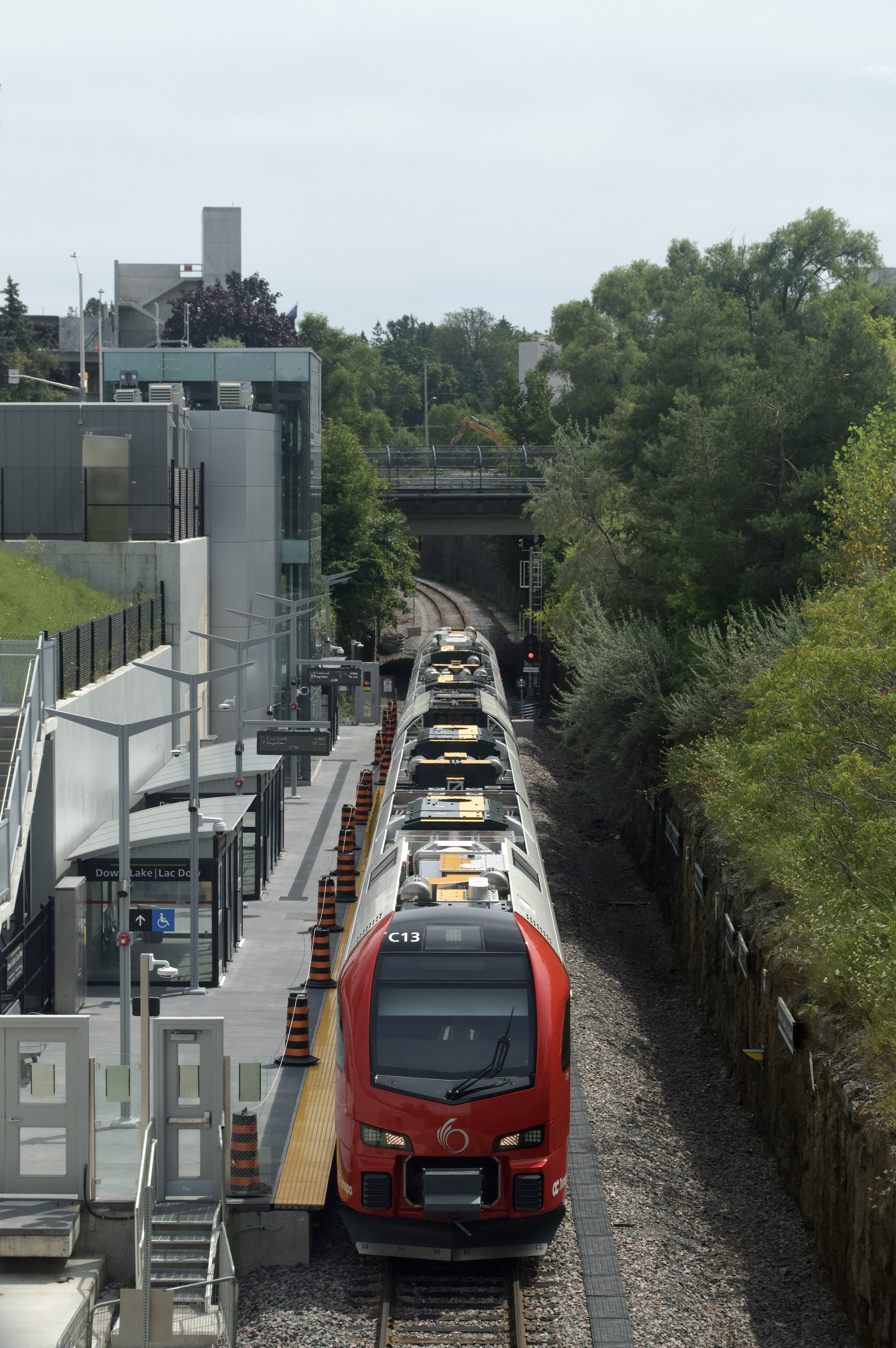
OC Transpo Stadler FLIRT dwells at Dow’s Lake O-Train station

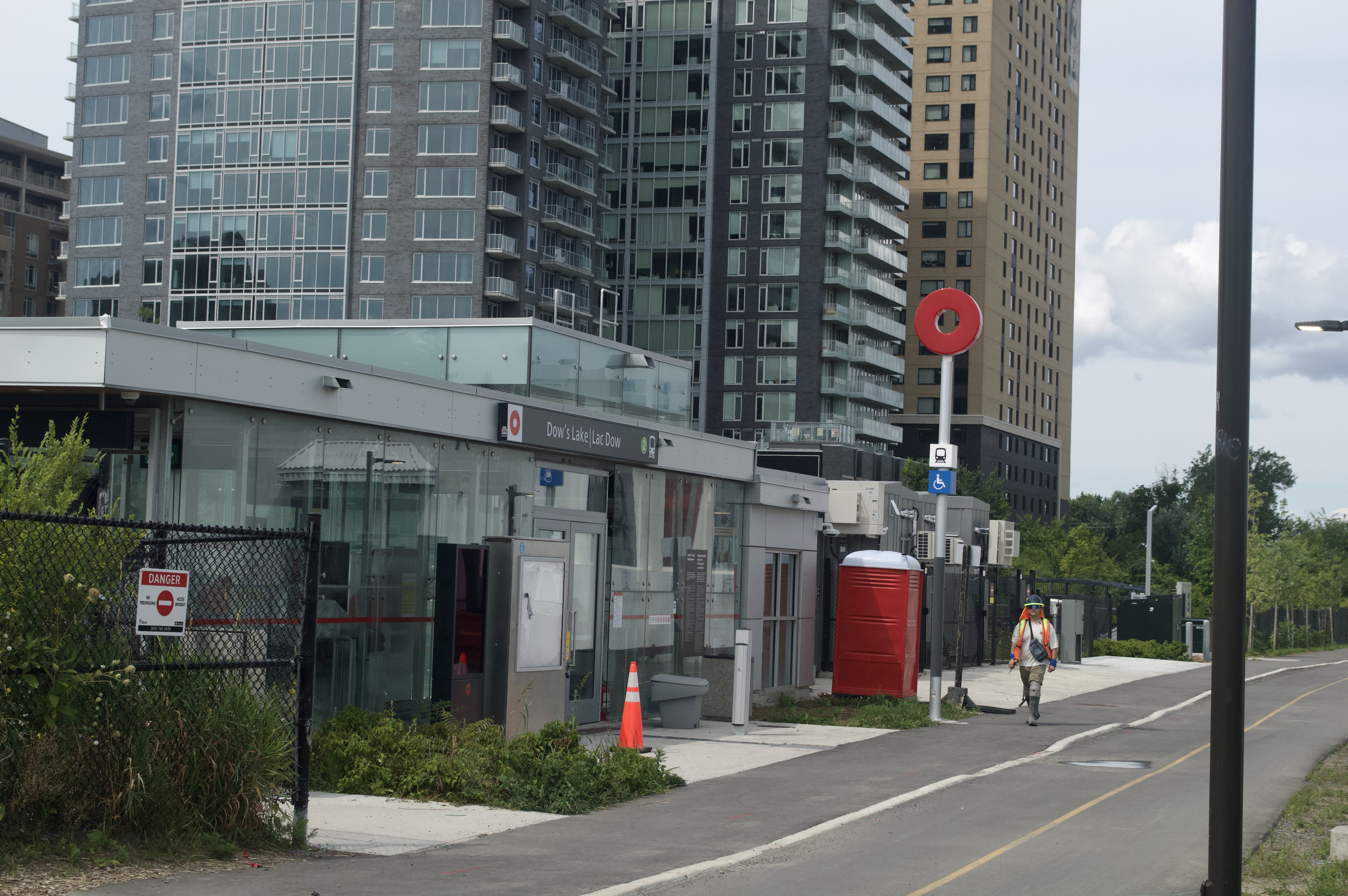
Entrance to the Dow’s Lake O-Train station

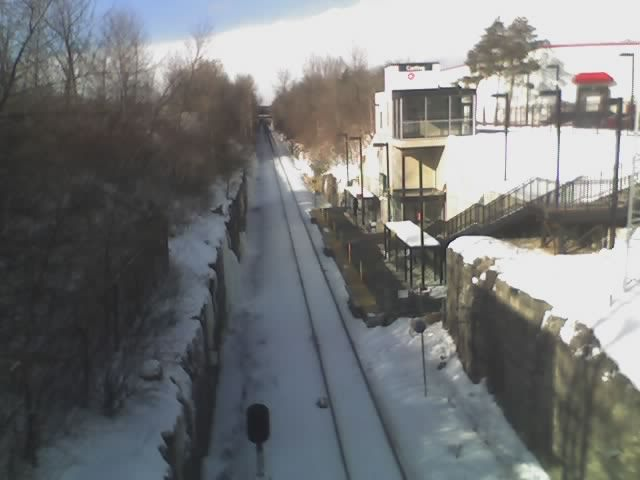
Dow's Lake station, facing north towards Bayview station

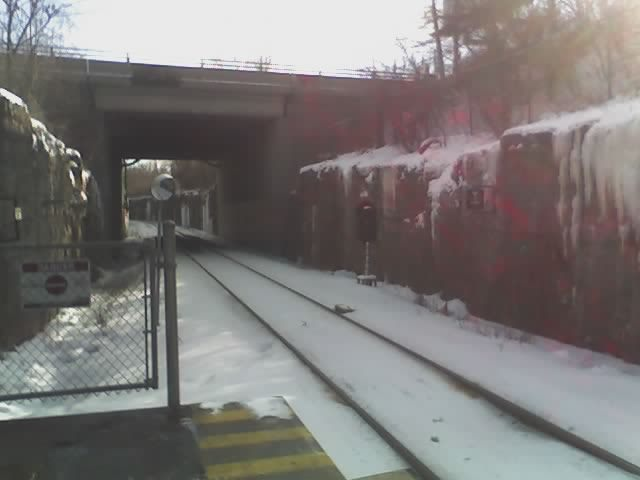
Southbound view of the O-Train Trillium Line at Dow's Lake, towards Carleton station
