= Carleton station =

Railway station in Ottawa, Ontario, Canada

Carleton
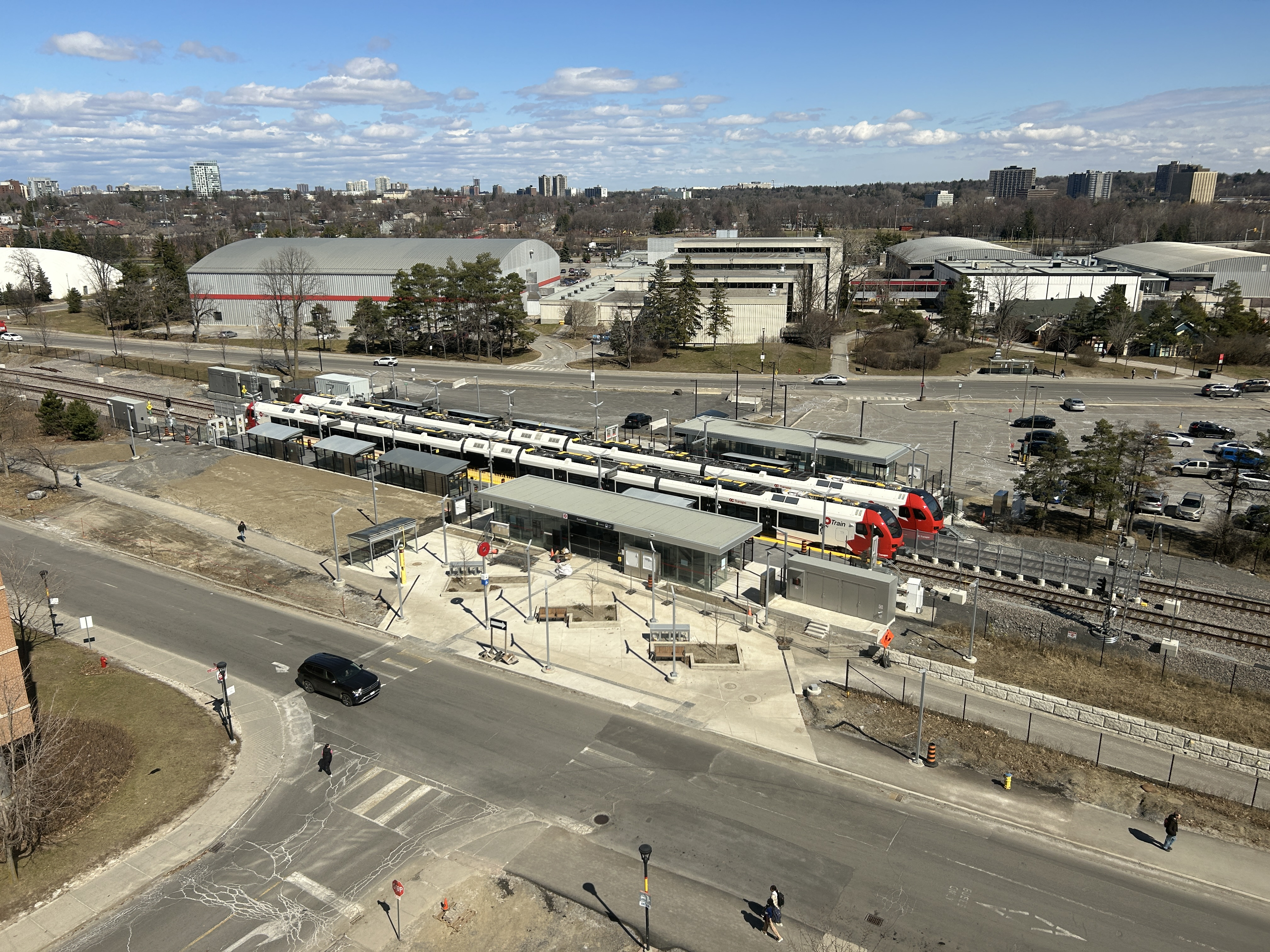
- Overhead view of Carleton station. Two Stadler FLIRT trains dwell at both platforms.

General information
- Coordinates: 45°23′08″N 75°41′45″W
- Owner: OC Transpo
- Platforms: 2 side platforms
- Tracks: 2

Construction
- Parking: Parking Lot P4
- Cycle facilities: Bike shelter at both entrances
- Accessible: Yes

History
- Opened: 2001
- Rebuilt: 2017, 2020–2025

Services
Preceding station	OC Transpo	Following station
Dow's Lake toward Bayview	Line 2	Mooney's Bay toward Limebank
Location

Carleton station is an O-Train light rail station located in the center of the Carleton University campus in Ottawa, Ontario. The station is served by Line 2, which began service in 2001, and is between Dow's Lake station to the north and Mooney's Bay station to the south. Along with the rest of the Trillium Line, the station closed on May 3, 2020, for the extension of the line and an upgrade of the station. The station re-opened on January 6, 2025.

== History ==
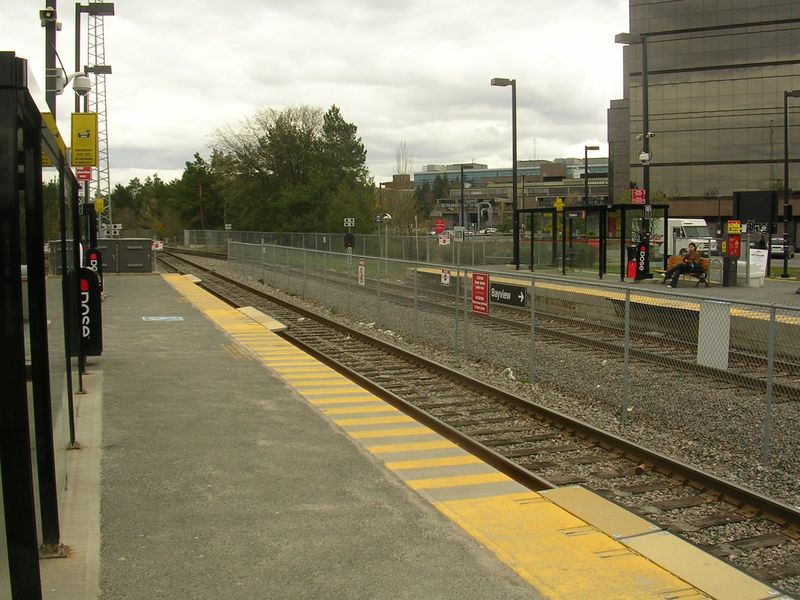
The station in 2005

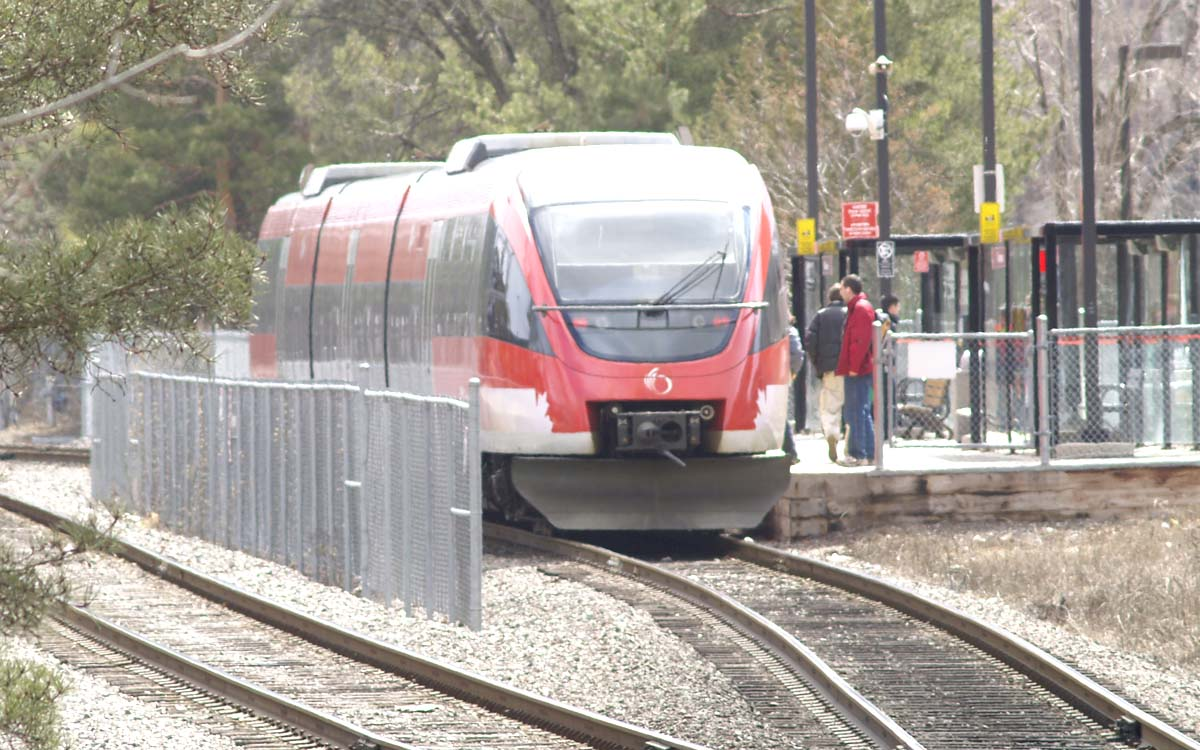
A Bombardier Talent train at Carleton station in 2008, before the fleet was replaced in 2015 and the station upgraded in 2017.

Carleton station was previously the only O-Train station along the Trillium Line with separate tracks and platforms for each direction, in order to allow the two trains working the otherwise (formerly) single-track line at any given time to pass. Since service upgrades in 2014-2015, and the ongoing O-Train South expansion project (Stage 2), more passing tracks have been added to the line. The station was upgraded in 2017 to accommodate the installations of fare gates and shelters parallel to the existing platforms, replacing the previous Proof-of-payment system.

== Stage 2 expansion and upgrades ==
South of the station, the line crosses over the Rideau River on a bridge, which was refurbished during Stage 2. As part of the Stage 2 South expansion, the southernmost pedestrian underpass linking Richcraft Hall and Pigiarvik was rehabilitated, and the main pedestrian underpass located between the station platforms and the Maintenance Building was demolished and replaced with a new structure double the length of the original. During Stage 2, a short tunnel was dug perpendicular to the platforms at their north end. Although it is currently not connected, in the near-to-medium-term future it will provide a direct, weather-protected connection between the station and the Carleton University tunnel system; likely to be connected to the Minto CASE in the building's later expansion. In the 2023 Campus Master Plan update and the 2019 Carleton University Transportation Strategy, the university included plans to build a bus loop or transit hub on the eastern side of the station, in the footprint of existing Parking Lot P4- and relocating all bus connections and bus–train transfers to that area. Pending approval by the City of Ottawa, Carleton plans to connect the transit hub directly to the northbound platform of the train station, providing an additional fare-paid access point for the community.

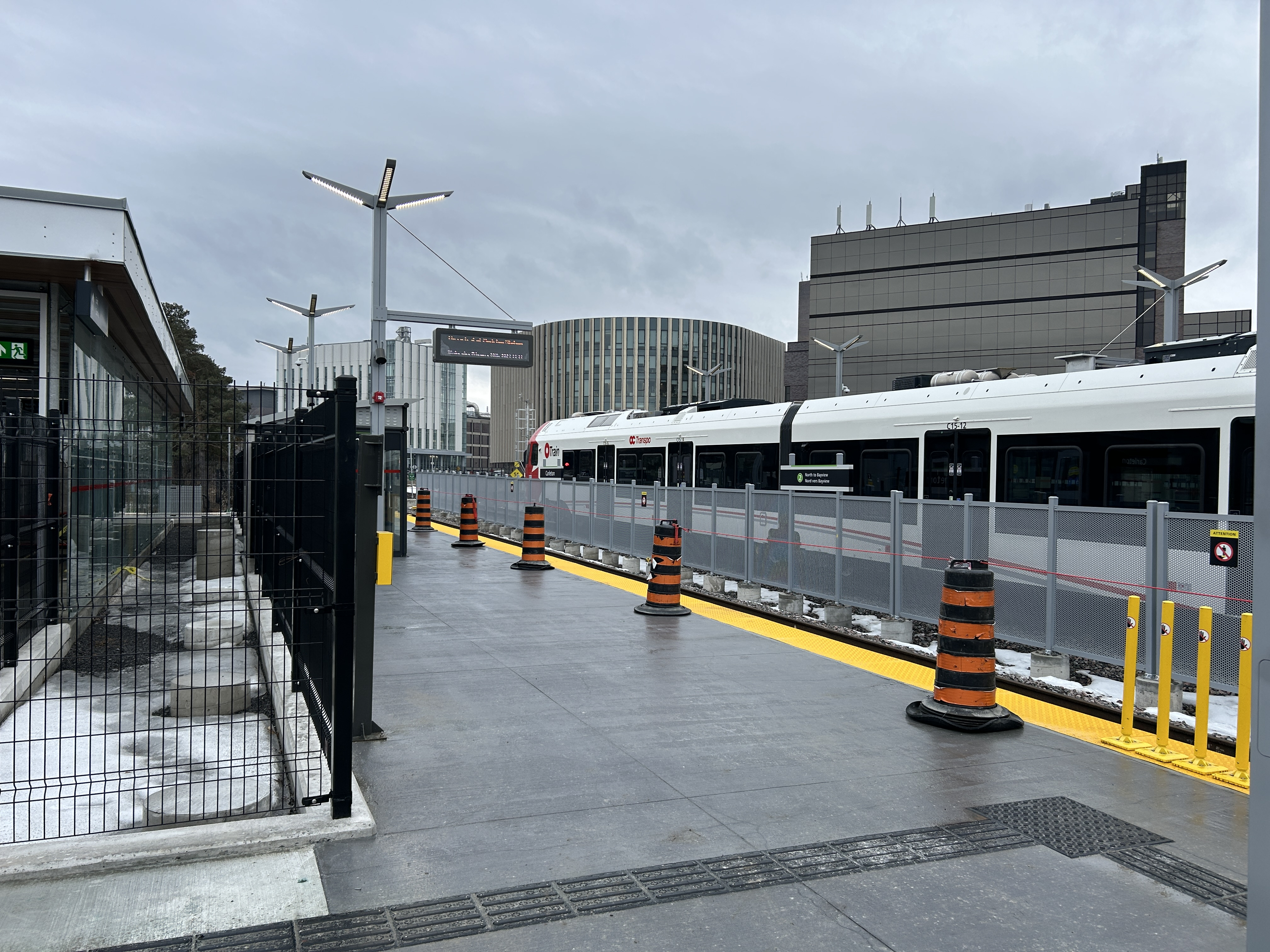
A Stadler FLIRT train dwells on the southbound platform during Stage 2 testing and construction

== Service ==
The following routes serve Carleton station as of March 29th, 2025:

Key
Line 1 (O-Train) Line 2 (O-Train) Line 4 (O-Train)	O-Train
E1	Shuttle Express
R1 R2 R4	O-Train replacement bus routes
N75	Night routes
40 12	Frequent routes
99 162	Local routes
275	Connexion routes
303	Shopper routes
405	Event routes
646	School routes
STO	Société de transport de l'Outaouais routes
Additional info: Line 1: Confederation Line; Line 2: Trillium Line; Line 4: Airport Link; Routes 5 to 199: Custom routing that that connects to Line 1 and/or 2; Routes 200 to 299: Connexion (peak-period only routes that connect to the O-Train); Routes 301 to 305: Shopper Routes (limited rural service); Routes 404 to 406: Canadian Tire Centre events; Routes 450 to 456: Lansdowne Park events; Routes 600 to 699: School Routes; Route R1: replaces Line 1 when it is out of service; Route R2: replaces Line 2 when it is out of service; Route R4: replaces Line 4 when it is out of service; Routes N39 to N98: night service (replaces Line 1 and N98 replaces Line 4); White backgrounds: limited service; Last two digits represent service area: 00s and 10s – Central; 20s – Gloucester; 30s – Orléans; 40s – Ottawa East; 50s – Ottawa West; 60s – Kanata, Stittsville; 70s – Barrhaven; 80s – Nepean; 90s – South Keys

Carleton station service
O-Train (North)	Line 2 (O-Train)
O-Train (South)	Line 2 (O-Train)
A (Campus Ave.)	R2 7 10 48 111
B (University Dr.)	R2 7 10 48 111

== See also ==
- Carleton University
- Stadler FLIRT
