= Mooney's Bay station =

Railway station in Ottawa, Ontario, Canada

Mooney's Bay
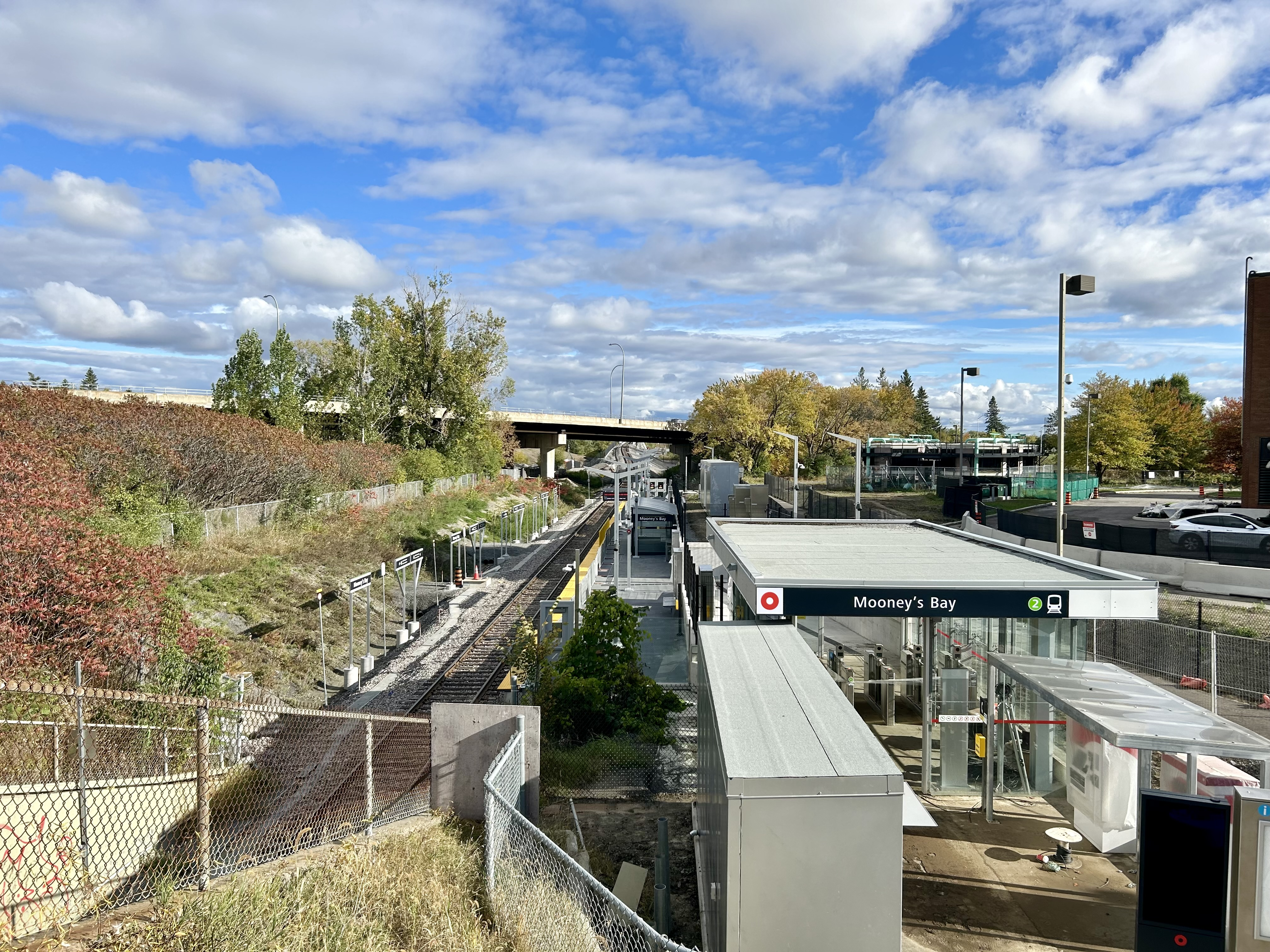
- Mooney's Bay station while Line 2 was shut down for construction. October 2023.

General information
- Coordinates: 45°22′36.7″N 75°41′5.7″W
- Owner: OC Transpo
- Platforms: Single platform
- Tracks: 1

Construction
- Parking: No
- Cycle facilities: Yes
- Accessible: 1

History
- Opened: 2001
- Rebuilt: 2017, 2020–2025
- Former names: Confederation

Services
Preceding station	OC Transpo	Following station
Carleton toward Bayview	Line 2	Walkley toward Limebank
Location

Mooney's Bay station is an O-Train station along Line 2 located near Heron Road and Bronson Avenue in Ottawa, Ontario, which primarily serves the Government of Canada offices in the Confederation Heights area, and students from Brookfield High School. In 2011, a pedestrian and cyclist path was built to provide a direct link between Mooney's Bay station and Brookfield Road.

The station was originally named Confederation station after the area in which the station is located, Confederation Heights. On December 24, 2017, the station was renamed to Mooney's Bay station (after nearby Mooney's Bay Park) to avoid confusion with the O-Train's new Confederation Line, which opened in 2019. Along with the rest of the Trillium Line, the station closed on May 3, 2020, for the extension of the line and an upgrade of the station, including a lengthened platform. The station re-opened on January 6, 2025.

== Facilities ==
- Accessibility: Wheelchair accessible with ramp and stairs connecting to Heron Road.
- Washrooms: None
- Nearby: Government of Canada building 501 Heron Road, Sir Leonard Tilley Building, Canada Post, 1500 Bronson Avenue, Revenue Canada Data Centre

== Service ==
The following routes serve Mooney's Bay station as of January 6, 2025:

Key
Line 1 (O-Train) Line 2 (O-Train) Line 4 (O-Train)	O-Train
E1	Shuttle Express
R1 R2 R4	O-Train replacement bus routes
N75	Night routes
40 12	Frequent routes
99 162	Local routes
275	Connexion routes
303	Shopper routes
405	Event routes
646	School routes
STO	Société de transport de l'Outaouais routes
Additional info: Line 1: Confederation Line; Line 2: Trillium Line; Line 4: Airport Link; Routes 5 to 199: Custom routing that that connects to Line 1 and/or 2; Routes 200 to 299: Connexion (peak-period only routes that connect to the O-Train); Routes 301 to 305: Shopper Routes (limited rural service); Routes 404 to 406: Canadian Tire Centre events; Routes 450 to 456: Lansdowne Park events; Routes 600 to 699: School Routes; Route R1: replaces Line 1 when it is out of service; Route R2: replaces Line 2 when it is out of service; Route R4: replaces Line 4 when it is out of service; Routes N39 to N98: night service (replaces Line 1 and N98 replaces Line 4); White backgrounds: limited service; Last two digits represent service area: 00s and 10s – Central; 20s – Gloucester; 30s – Orléans; 40s – Ottawa East; 50s – Ottawa West; 60s – Kanata, Stittsville; 70s – Barrhaven; 80s – Nepean; 90s – South Keys

Stop	Routes
O-Train (North/South)	Line 2 (O-Train)
A (1342)	88 90 111 112 646 689
B (5602)	88 90 111 112 646 689
C (1004)	R2 10
D (1123)	R2 10

=== Notes ===
- Route 10 is also available via a walking tunnel at 1500 Bronson, served by bus stops 4091 to Hurdman and 5626 to Lyon.
- Route R2 is only active for Line 2 planned closures (replacement bus service).
