= Bowesville station =

Railway station in Ottawa, Ontario, Canada

Bowesville
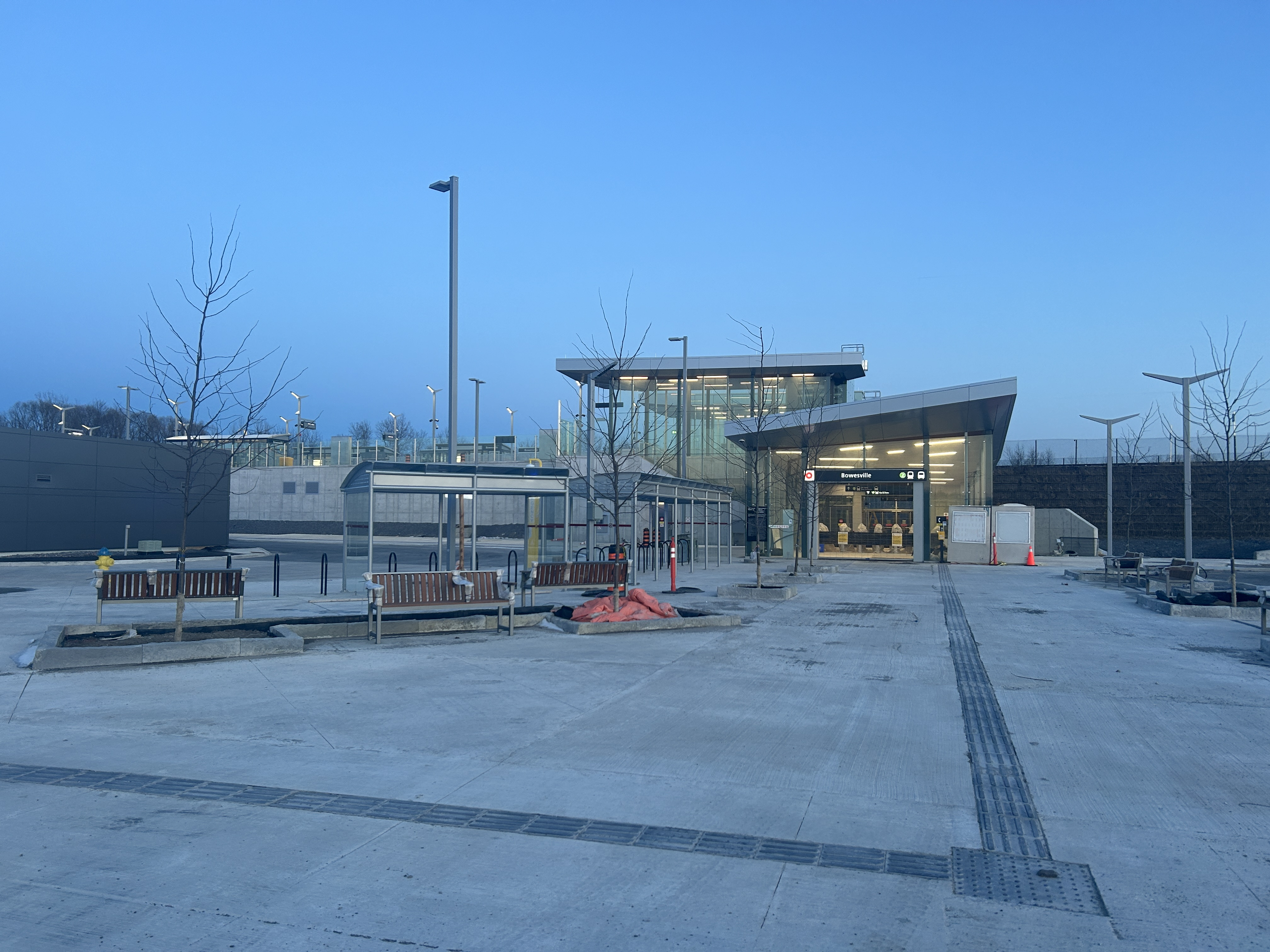
- Bowesville station, under construction (2024)

General information
- Coordinates: 45°17′33.8″N 75°37′56.7″W
- Owner: OC Transpo
- Platforms: Side platforms
- Tracks: 2

Construction
- Structure type: Surface
- Parking: 800 spaces, later 2,000
- Cycle facilities: Bicycle parking shelter
- Accessible: Yes

Other information
- Station code: 3067

History
- Opening: January 6, 2025

Other services
Preceding station	OC Transpo	Following station
Leitrim toward Bayview	Line 2	Limebank Terminus
Location

Bowesville is a station on Line 2 in Ottawa, Ontario. It is a part of the Stage 2 O-Train expansion and was opened to the public on January 6, 2025. The station consists of two side platforms and is located southeast of the intersection of Bowesville and Earl Armstrong roads.

The station serves primarily as a connection point with the southern communities of Ottawa, including Greely, Manotick, and Metcalfe. Bowesville initially opened with 800 parking spaces in its Park and Ride lot, and will later be expanded to 2,000 spaces. The station also includes a bus loop within a fare paid zone, as well as a building for staff facilities in the middle. This station has no planned regular bus service. There is a covered bike shelter with capacity for 20 bikes by the main entrance to the station.

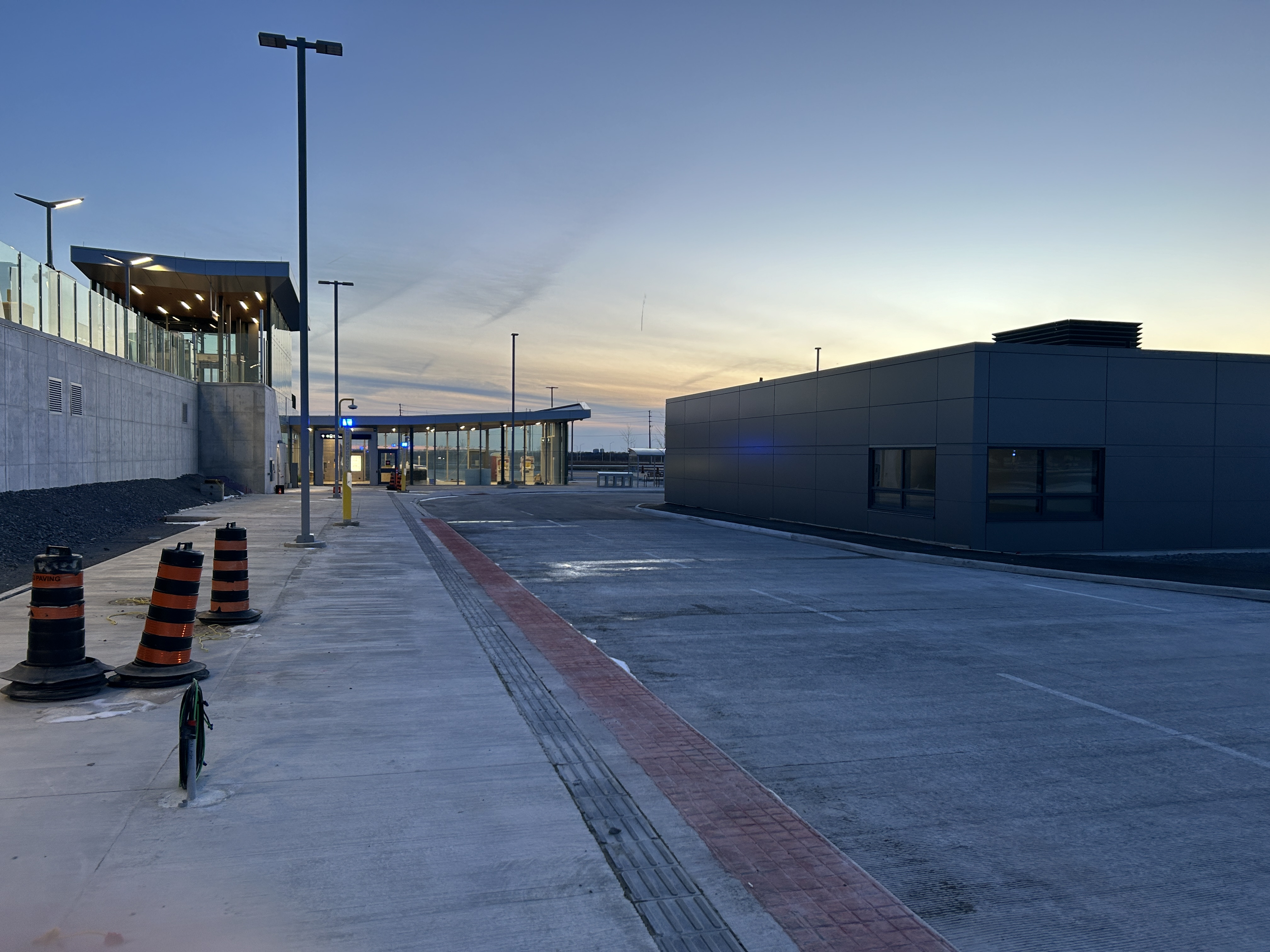
Bus platform in the bus loop at Bowesville, facing West towards the station entrance. Staff facilities building is shown on the right.

== Service ==
The following routes service Bowesville station:

Stop	Routes
North O-Train	Line 2 (O-Train)
South O-Train	Line 2 (O-Train)
A	
B Rail Replacement	R2
C	105 110

== Notes ==
- During the early morning before the beginning of O-Train Line 2 service hours, Route 110 is extended from Limebank to Greenboro station but it does not serve any extra stops along the extension.
