= Leitrim station =

Railway station in Ottawa, Ontario, Canada

Leitrim
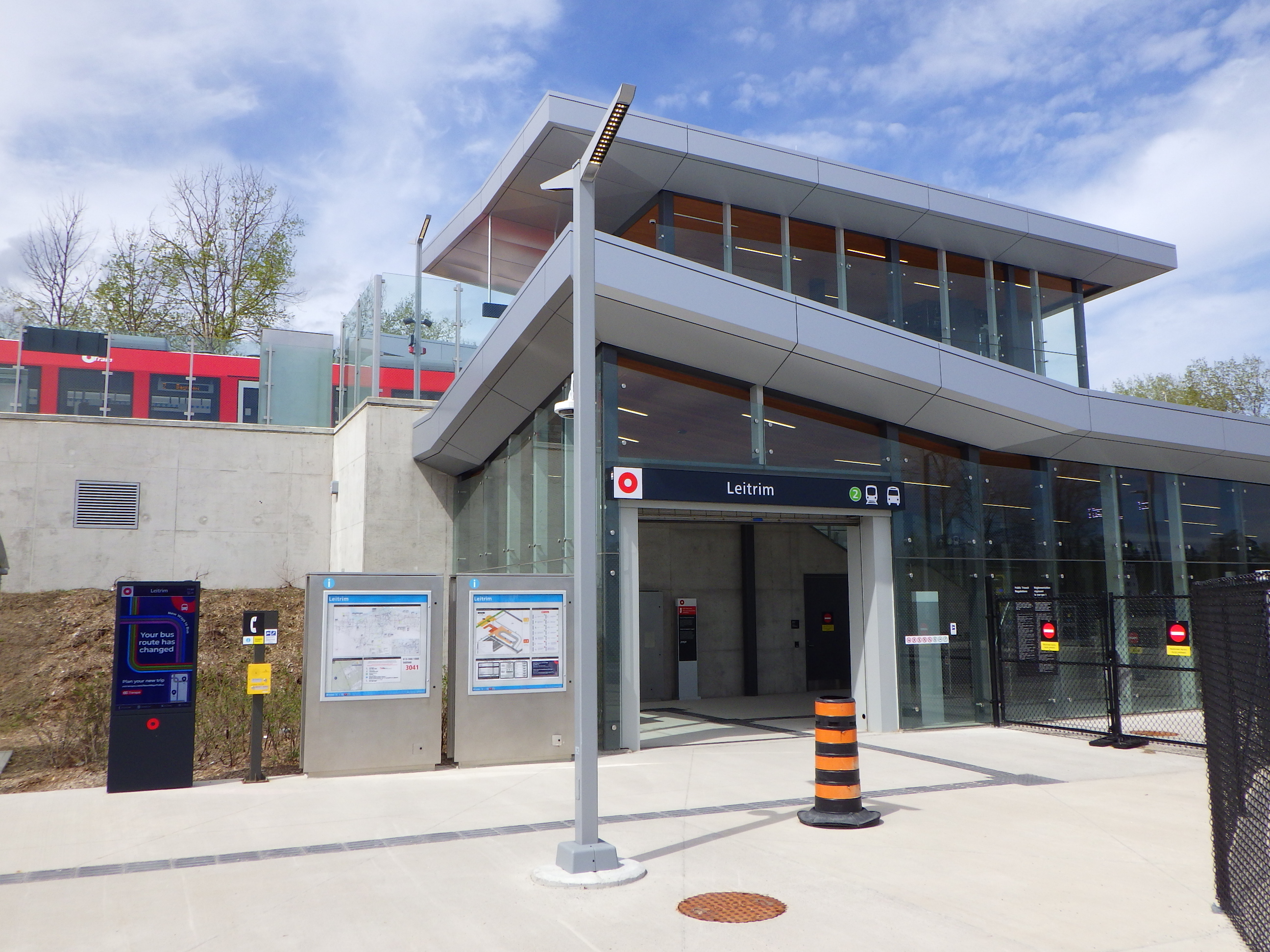
- Main entrance of Leitrim Station

General information
- Location: Gilligan Road, Leitrim; Ottawa, Ontario; Canada
- Coordinates: 45°18′52″N 75°37′50″W
- Owner: OC Transpo
- Platforms: Side platforms
- Tracks: 2

Construction
- Structure type: Elevated
- Parking: 300+ spaces, 9 accessible
- Cycle facilities: Bicycle shelter
- Accessible: Yes

Other information
- Station code: 3041

History
- Opening: January 6, 2025

Services
Preceding station	OC Transpo	Following station
South Keys toward Bayview	Line 2	Bowesville toward Limebank
Former services
Preceding station	OC Transpo	Following station
Limebank toward Barrhaven Centre	Route 99 Truncated April 2025	South Keys toward Hurdman
Location

Leitrim (/ˈliːtrəm/ LEE-trəm) is a station on Line 2 of Ottawa's O-Train and on the system's bus network, and is located in the suburban community of Leitrim. Situated on Gilligan Road, it serves as a transportation hub connecting residents to downtown Ottawa and other parts of the city. Leitrim station opened on January 6, 2025, as part of Ottawa's extensive Stage 2 transit expansion project.

== Station facilities ==
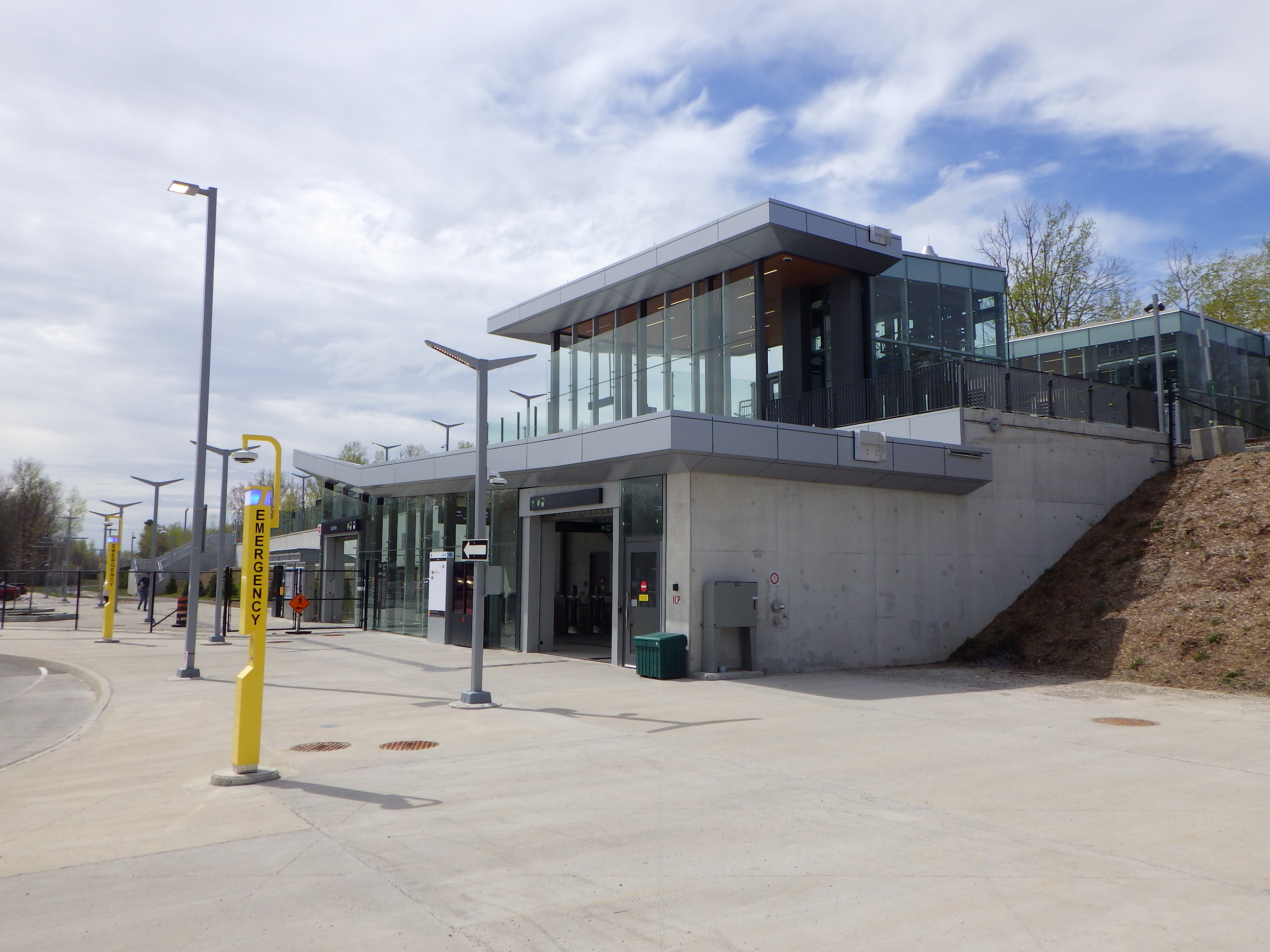
Leitrim Station entrance seen from the north

The station features two elevated side platforms and includes amenities such as sheltered waiting areas, bicycle shelters, and accessible parking spaces. The park-and-ride facility initially offers 290 spaces, with plans to expand to accommodate up to 925 vehicles in the future.

== O-Train service ==
Leitrim is a key station on Line 2, serving the Findlay Creek community and surrounding areas. It features a fare-paid bus loop with multiple shelters and staff facilities, enabling integration between bus and rail services.

== Service ==
Leitrim station service
North O-Train	Line 2 (O-Train)
South O-Train	Line 2 (O-Train)
A Off only	
B	R2 93 94 105 110 697

== Notes ==
- Stop C is unused
- During the early morning before the beginning of O-Train Line 2 service hours, Route 110 is extended from Limebank to Greenboro station but it does not serve any extra stops along the extension.
- School route 699 is accessible at the intersection of Leitrim and Albion, providing transportation options for students of the St. Francis Xavier and Pierre-de-Blois high schools.
