= Line 2 (O-Train) =

Diesel light rail line in Ottawa, Ontario

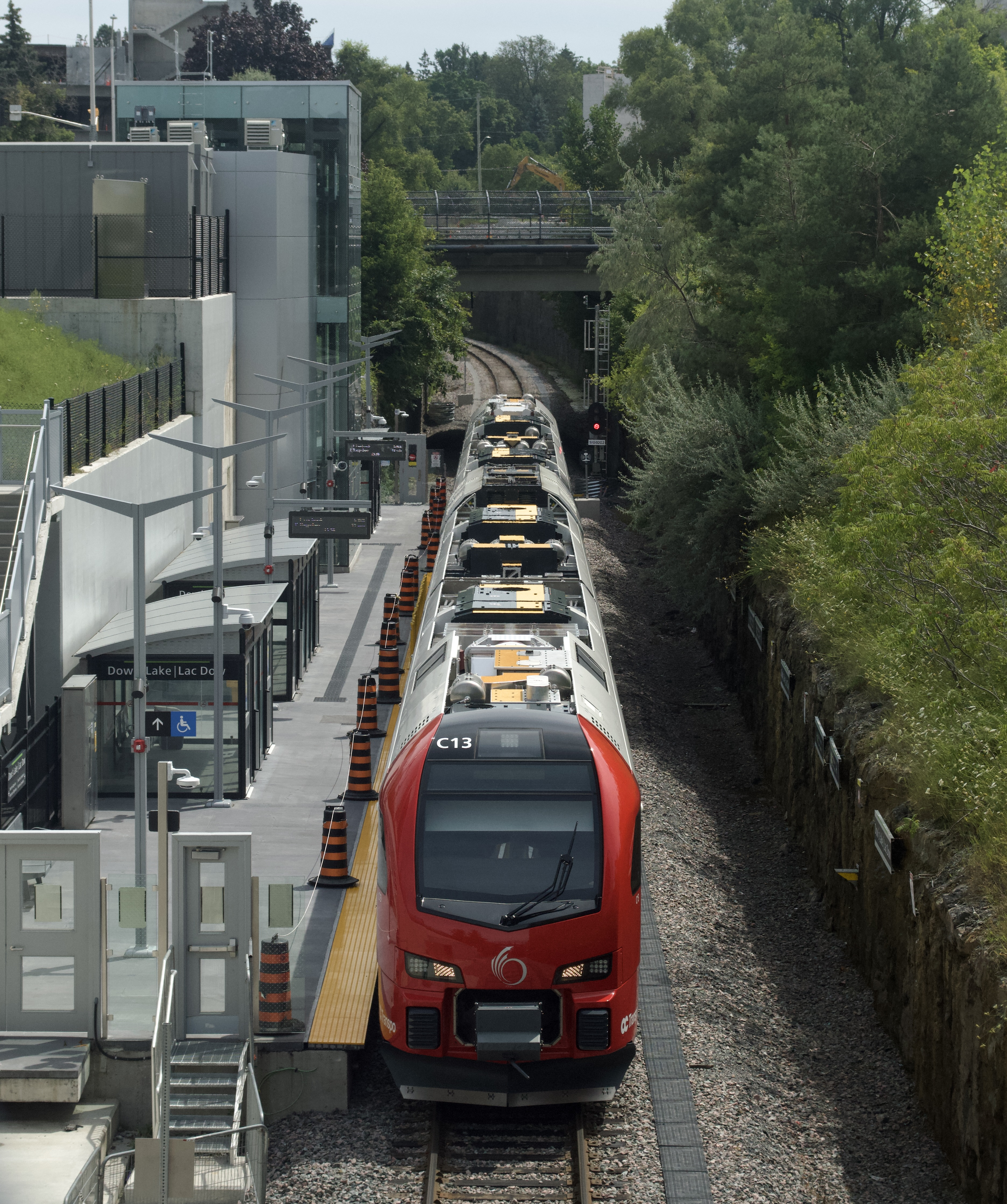
- Stadler FLIRT arriving at Dow's Lake station

Overview
- Other name: Trillium Line
- Status: Open
- Owner: City of Ottawa
- Locale: Ottawa, Ontario
- Stations: 11
- Website: Line 2 (OC Transpo)

Service
- Type: Diesel light rail
- System: O-Train
- Operator: OC Transpo under the name Capital Railway
- Rolling stock: Stadler FLIRT; Alstom Coradia LINT 41
- Daily ridership: 20,000 (avg. weekday, Q4 2019)
- Ridership: 3,922,500 (2018)

History
- Opened: October 15, 2001; 25 years ago
- Closed for upgrading: May 3, 2020; 6 years ago
- Reopened: January 6, 2025; 22 months ago

Technical
- Line length: 19 km (12 mi)
- Track gauge: 1,435 mm (4 ft 8 1/2 in) standard gauge
- Operating speed: 80 km/h (50 mph)
- Signalling: Canadian Rail Operating Rules
- Train protection system: Indusi (former); PTC
Route map
Line 2 highlighted in green

Capital Railway

Overview
- Headquarters: Walkley Yard
- Reporting mark: CR
- Locale: Ontario and Quebec

Line 2 (French: Ligne 2), formerly known as the Trillium Line (French: Ligne Trillium), is a 19-kilometre (12 mi) diesel light rail line in Ottawa, Ontario, Canada. Operated by OC Transpo, it runs north–south between Bayview and Limebank stations, using main line trains.

The first line in the O-Train system, Line 2 opened on October 15, 2001. It operates on a dedicated right-of-way with a mix of single and double-track sections. Although it serves as a public transit line, Line 2 is legally classified as a federally regulated mainline railway. It operates under the official name "Capital Railway", which appears on the trains alongside the O-Train logo.

Service on Line 2 has evolved over time. From October 2001 to March 2015, trains operated every 15 minutes on an 8-kilometre (5 mi) route between Bayview and Greenboro using three-module Bombardier Talent trains. In March 2015, the line switched to two-module Alstom LINT trains, with service frequency improving to every 12 minutes.

May 2020 marked the shutdown of the line for the Stage 2 expansion project. Originally expected to be completed by September 2022, service resumed on January 6, 2025. The expanded 19-kilometre (12 mi) line now extends to Limebank, with trains running every 12 minutes using either four-module Stadler FLIRT trains or coupled pairs of two-module Alstom LINT trains.

== History ==
=== Pilot project ===
The O-Train was introduced on October 15, 2001, as a pilot project to provide an alternative to the Transitway bus rapid transit on which Ottawa had long depended exclusively for its high-grade transit service. The single-track line operated with five stations and a single passing loop at Carleton station.

As a pilot project, the O-Train system was built at the cost of CA$21 million, relatively little compared with the hundreds of millions of dollars usually required to build a new transit line. It runs on an existing Canadian Pacific Railway track (Ellwood and Prescott subdivisions of Bytown and Prescott Railway), so the only construction work necessary was to build the stations themselves and the passing tracks necessary to allow trains to operate in both directions. The track is shared with Ottawa Central freight trains south of Walkley Yard, which occasionally serve the National Research Council of Canada's Automotive and Surface Transportation Research Centre.

From 2001 until 2015, the system used three diesel-powered Bombardier Talent BR643 low-floor diesel multiple unit trains. It was, however, described as "light rail", partly because plans called for it to be extended into Ottawa's downtown as a tramway-like service, and partly because the Talent vehicles, though designed for mainline railways in Europe, are much smaller and lighter than most mainline trains in North America, and do not meet the Association of American Railroads' standards for crash strength. Ottawa is also authorized to run trains with only a single operator and no other crew, something rare on mainline railways in North America.

Until late 2014, the official name of the diesel-powered, north–south line was "O-Train". After construction started on a second, east–west urban rail line (the Confederation Line), the O-Train name was applied to the entire system, and the north–south line was renamed the "Trillium Line".

==== Original service ====
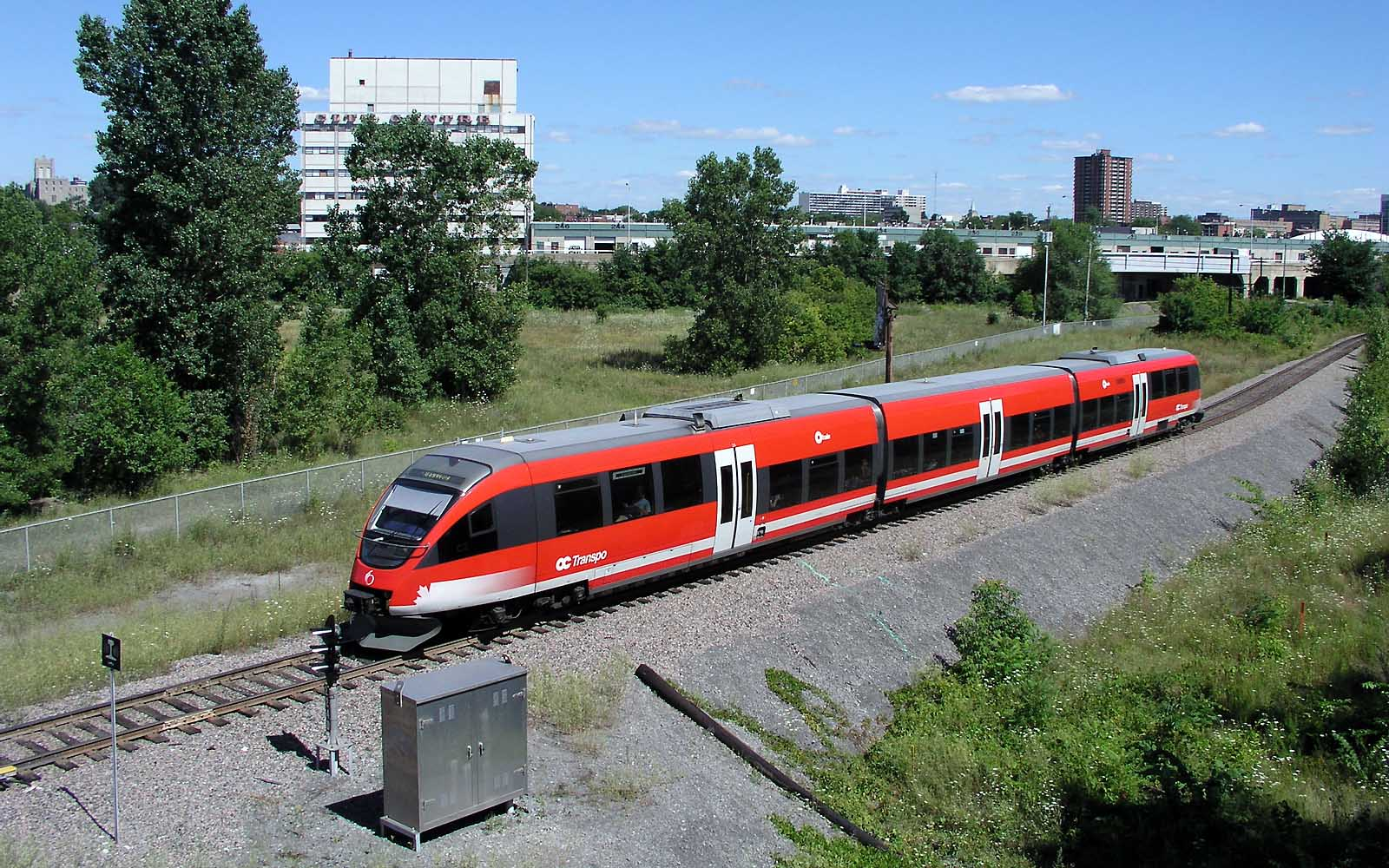
From 2001 to 2015, service was operated by two Bombardier Talent trains

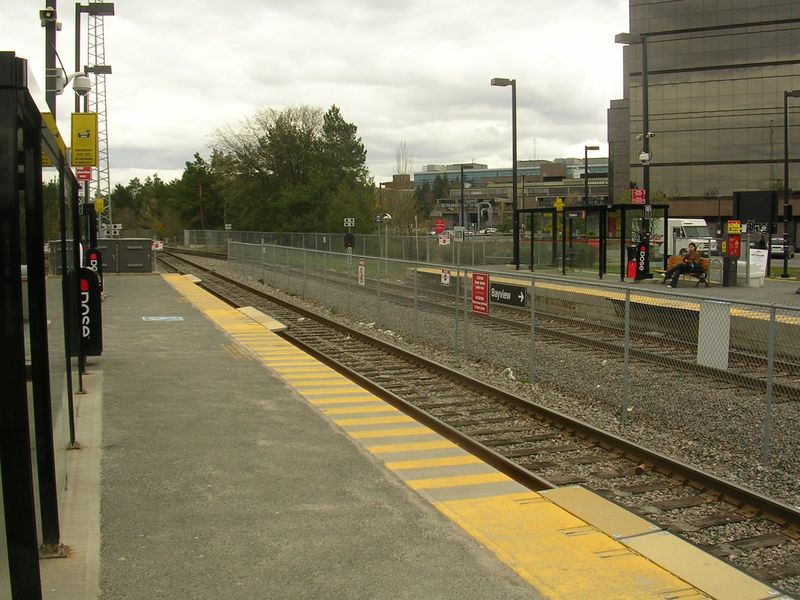
Carleton was the only location with two tracks during the pilot service. Note retractable platform extenders at solid yellow markings.

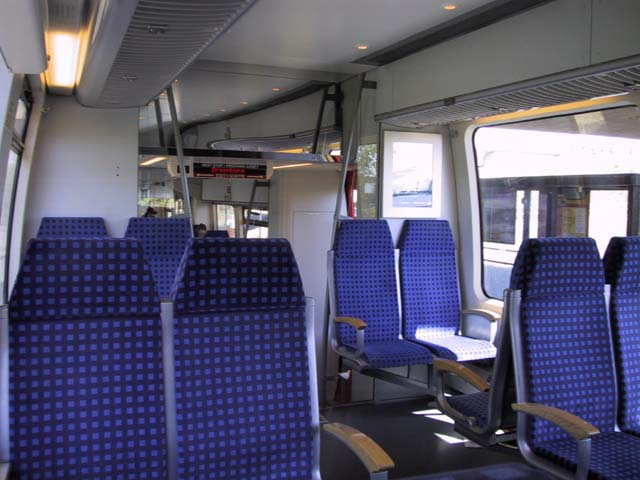
Interior of the Bombardier Talent carriages (2001–2015)

Ticketing on Line 2 originally worked entirely on a proof-of-payment basis; there were no ticket barriers or turnstiles, and the driver did not check fares. Occasionally, OC Transpo Special Constables or other employees prompted passengers for proof-of-payment. Tickets can be purchased from a vending machine on the platform, and certain bus passes are also valid for Line 2. Line 2 tickets were exchanged for bus transfers upon boarding a bus. Although bus transfers can be used to board the O-Train, prepaid bus tickets cannot.

The European trains were narrower than the North American standard. In order to enable night-time use of the line by standard-width freight services, retractable platform extenders were mounted at each station other than Bayview (which is constructed on its own private rail spur). Passengers gain access to Line 2 on these extenders. When a freight train needs to pass through a station, the extenders are retracted, allowing the wider train to pass through.

The 15-minute headway combined with a travel time of 12 minutes end-to-end made it possible to run the line with a fleet of just three trains (of which only two were in service at any given time) and a single track, apart from passing sidings at Carleton station.

The Trillium Line hit the 1-millionth rider mark on May 29, 2002, the 5-millionth mark on January 21, 2005, and the 10-millionth in late 2010. In mid-2011, the Trillium Line carried an average of approximately 12,000 riders each day.

==== Awards ====
In June 2002, the O-Train Light Rail Transit project received the Canadian Urban Transit Association’s Corporate Innovation Award.

On January 16, 2003, the Ontario chapter of the American Public Works Association (APWA) presented the City of Ottawa, Canadian Pacific Railway and Morrison Hershfield with the APWA Public Works Project of the Year award in the transportation category. This award was established to highlight excellence in the management and administration of public works projects by recognizing the alliance between the managing agency, the consultant and the contractors who, working together, complete public works projects.

A third award the Trillium Line Light Rail transit project received was in May 2003, in the sustainable transportation category of the FCM-CH2M Hill Sustainable Community Awards.

==== Criticism of pilot project ====
The main complaints about the Trillium Line pilot have revolved around its placement and ridership levels. The Trillium Line's route was determined by existing railway tracks, rather than the parts of the city that needed public transport, which would have required new tracks to be laid. Carleton University students, however, have benefited from the connection to the busy Ottawa Transitway system.

The other criticism is that there is low ridership of the trains compared to some crowded bus lines, such as the 90–99 series routes. A fully loaded Line 2 train carries 285 passengers compared to 131 passengers for an articulated bus. The O-Train schedule is limited by track capacity.

==== Early extension plans ====
In July 2006, Ottawa City Council approved a north–south light rail expansion project. The project would have terminated diesel light rail service on the Trillium Line so as to reuse its right-of-way for a double-track, electric light rail line that would have extended west from the University of Ottawa to Bayview then south to Leitrim and then west to Barrhaven. However, in December 2006, Ottawa City Council cancelled this project, thus leaving the diesel-powered Trillium Line unchanged.

=== Service improvements ===
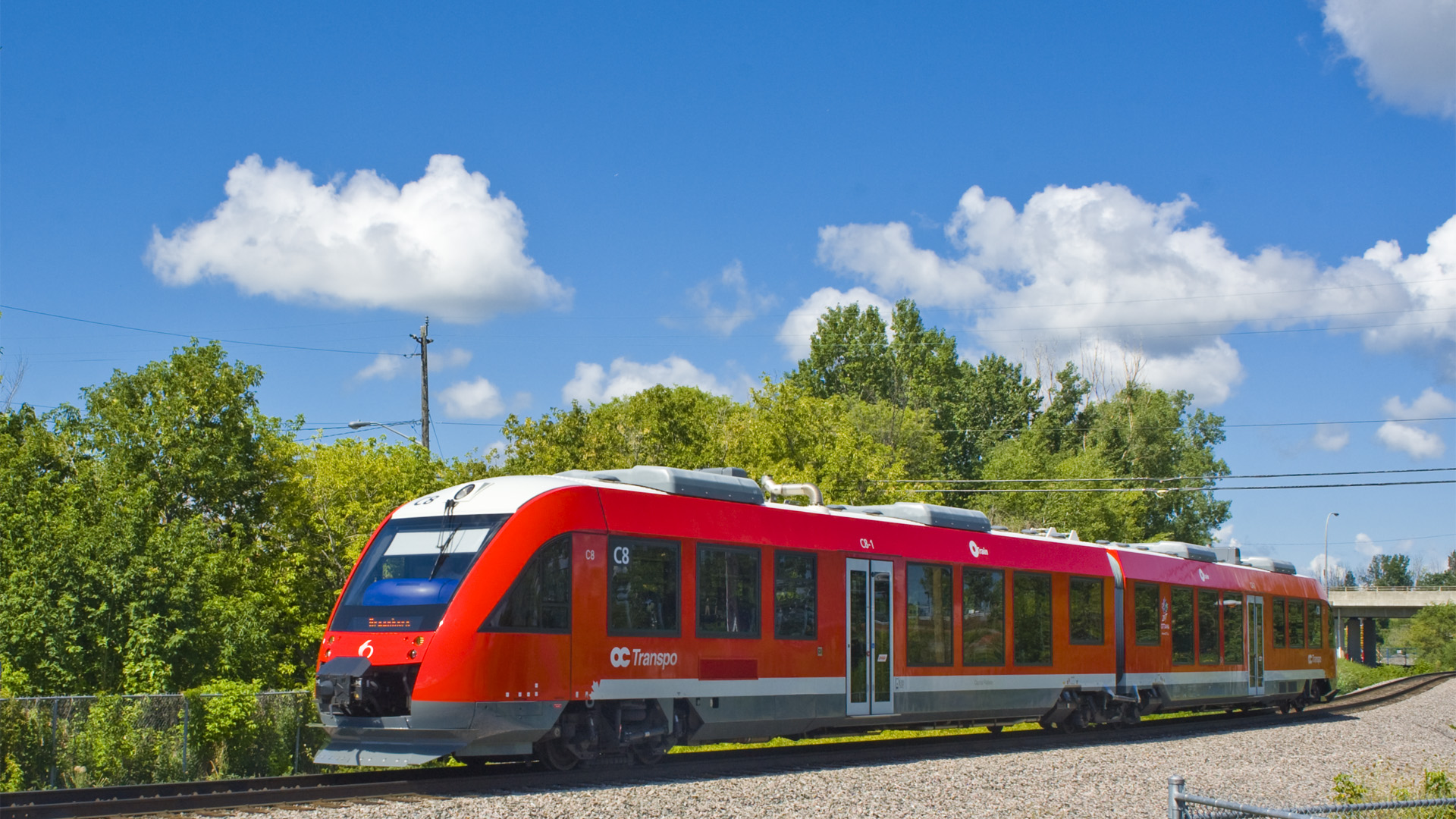
From 2015 to 2020, service was operated using single-unit Alstom LINT trains

On May 18, 2011, OC Transpo approved a $200,000 study to expand the Trillium Line. The $59-million proposal included the purchase of six new trainsets and track improvements that would decrease headways from 15 minutes to 8 minutes. The project would finally cost $60.3 million.

In mid-2013, service on the Trillium Line was suspended for four months to implement service and track improvements such as new station platforms and two new passing tracks (near Brookfield and Gladstone). Upgrades were also made to the signal system, train controls, stations, tracks and train yard. A new centralized traffic control system was installed to improve safety and efficiency. Six new Alstom Coradia LINT 41 trainsets (replacing the three older Bombardier Talent units) and the two extra passing loops allowed the number of trains on the line to double to four.

Expanded service began on March 2, 2015, but suffered numerous problems during the first week. Although the changes were intended to improve frequency to eight minutes, the Trillium Line would ultimately operate at twelve minute frequency. After the completion of the Stage 2 project, the line was originally planned to continue operating using single-car trains; however, because of the lower-than-intended frequency, the city was forced to adjust the Stage 2 plan to include longer trains and platforms to compensate.

=== Derailment ===
On August 11, 2014, train C3 derailed while traveling northbound over the switch just south of Carleton station. The cause was determined to be a faulty spring switch that had not closed properly as well as the operator failing to follow regulations and physically inspect the switch after spotting a signal irregularity. No serious injuries occurred as a result of the derailment; however, train C3 received damage and was taken out of service. C3 was never repaired and never returned to service and as a result the line continued to operate with only two operational trains until the following March when the new Alstom LINT trains entered service. In June 2017, the spring switches at Carleton were replaced with powered switches.

=== Stage 2 expansion ===
As part of the city's Stage 2 LRT project, the Trillium Line was extended 11 kilometres (6.8 mi) south from Greenboro to Limebank using a new grade-separated railway with four new stations at South Keys, Leitrim, Bowesville and Limebank. At South Keys, the extension connects to the new Line 4, a 4-kilometre (2.5 mi) branch line to Macdonald–Cartier International Airport.

The project added a new pocket track, passing track and crossover tracks at South Keys station, and the tracks from the Leitrim Road overpass to Limebank station were double-tracked. In addition, two more stations were built along the existing portion of the line at Gladstone and Walkley. The project also included a number of other significant upgrades, including lengthening all existing passing tracks, purchasing seven new trains, doubling the length of all existing platforms, building a grade separation over the Via Rail line, rehabilitating rail bridges over the Rideau River and the Dow's Lake rail tunnel, upgrading the signalling system to implement positive train control, constructing several new pedestrian tunnels and overpasses, and numerous guideway and vehicle rehabilitation projects.

The contract for the project was approved on March 7, 2019, by city council, with construction of the airport spur beginning in mid-2019. The project was expected to be completed by the fourth quarter of 2022 but was delayed initially to October 2023, then to April 2024, then to mid-2024. On December 6, 2024, an opening date was announced, with revenue service beginning January 6, 2025.

The 4-kilometre (2.5 mi) Line 4 runs from Macdonald–Cartier International Airport north to South Keys station, where riders need to change trains to continue to Bayview station. South Keys station features an island platform to facilitate cross-platform transfers for passengers arriving from the airport branch to trains bound for Bayview station. The spur's funding came from the federal and provincial governments, as well as the airport authority, instead of from the city itself.

On February 22, 2019, the city announced that the selected proponent to construct the project was TransitNEXT, a wholly owned subsidiary of SNC-Lavalin. This decision was controversial as the federal government and SNC-Lavalin were involved in a political scandal at the time, which led to extra scrutiny by city councillors, with some calling for a delay on the vote to approve the contract in order to allow more time for review. Ultimately Council voted not to delay the approval and the contract was approved on March 7, 2019. It was later revealed that TransitNEXT's bid had not met the minimum technical scoring threshold in order to be considered, which continued the controversy. The city eventually explained that the decision to award the contract to TransitNEXT was done at the discretion of city staff to get a better deal for the city and was within the rules of the procurement process. An investigation conducted by the city's auditor general later confirmed that the authority delegated by council gave city staff sole discretion on whether to allow a bid to proceed even if it had not met the minimum scoring threshold, and that staff had otherwise correctly followed the entire procurement process that had been approved by council.

Work on the Stage 2 extension began in mid-2019, starting with the clear-cutting of trees along the corridors used by the extension. Construction of the airport spur was expected to be completed in 2020 to give the airport authority time to rebuild the terminal and connect it to the future station.

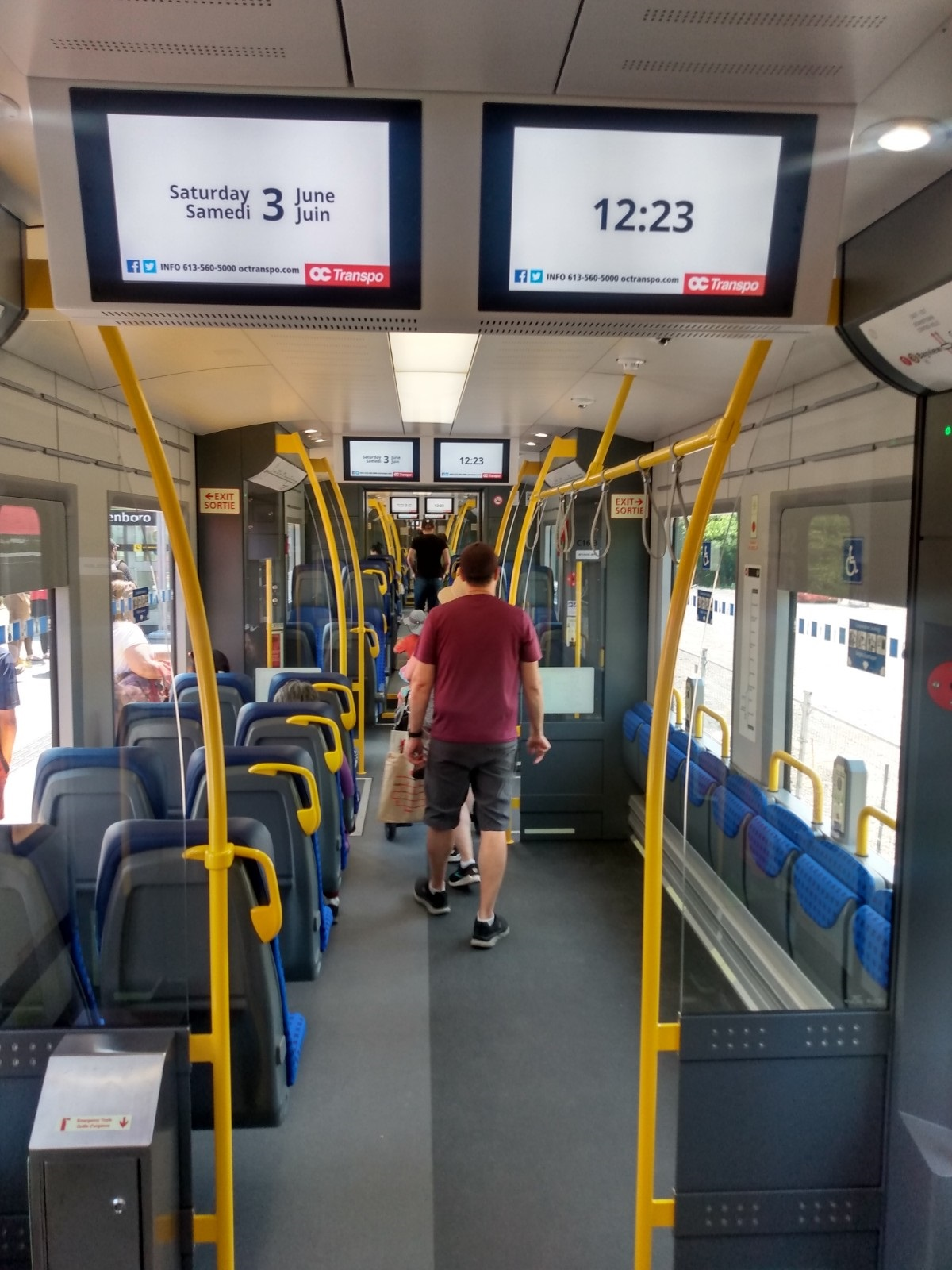
Stadler FLIRT train interior on display for Doors Open Ottawa 2023

On May 3, 2020, the line was shut down for the expansion project. The project was originally expected to be complete by September 2022 but was delayed several times. On May 26, 2023, the Light Rail Transit Sub-Committee received an update on the progress of construction for Lines 2 and 4, noting that construction was going well and that handover of the system to the city was expected in approximately the first or second week of October 2023, though that was subject to shifting earlier or later pending the results of operational testing across both lines. Michael Morgan, the director of rail construction, reaffirmed that all signs were pointing to Lines 2 and 4 beginning revenue service by the end of 2023 and stated that Line 4 would likely be the first of the two branches to open to the public. It was also revealed that, due to lessons learned from the launch of the Confederation Line in late 2019, parallel bus service would be retained across both lines through the end of the first winter they were in operation, so as to mitigate unforeseen disruptions caused by any remaining unexpected events related to the construction. Final testing of the line began in October 2024, with successful completion of trial running by October 31.

The line reopened on January 6, 2025, beginning with a 5-day service week, which expanded to a 6-day service week on January 25; and expanded to 7-day service on March 16.

== Future extensions ==
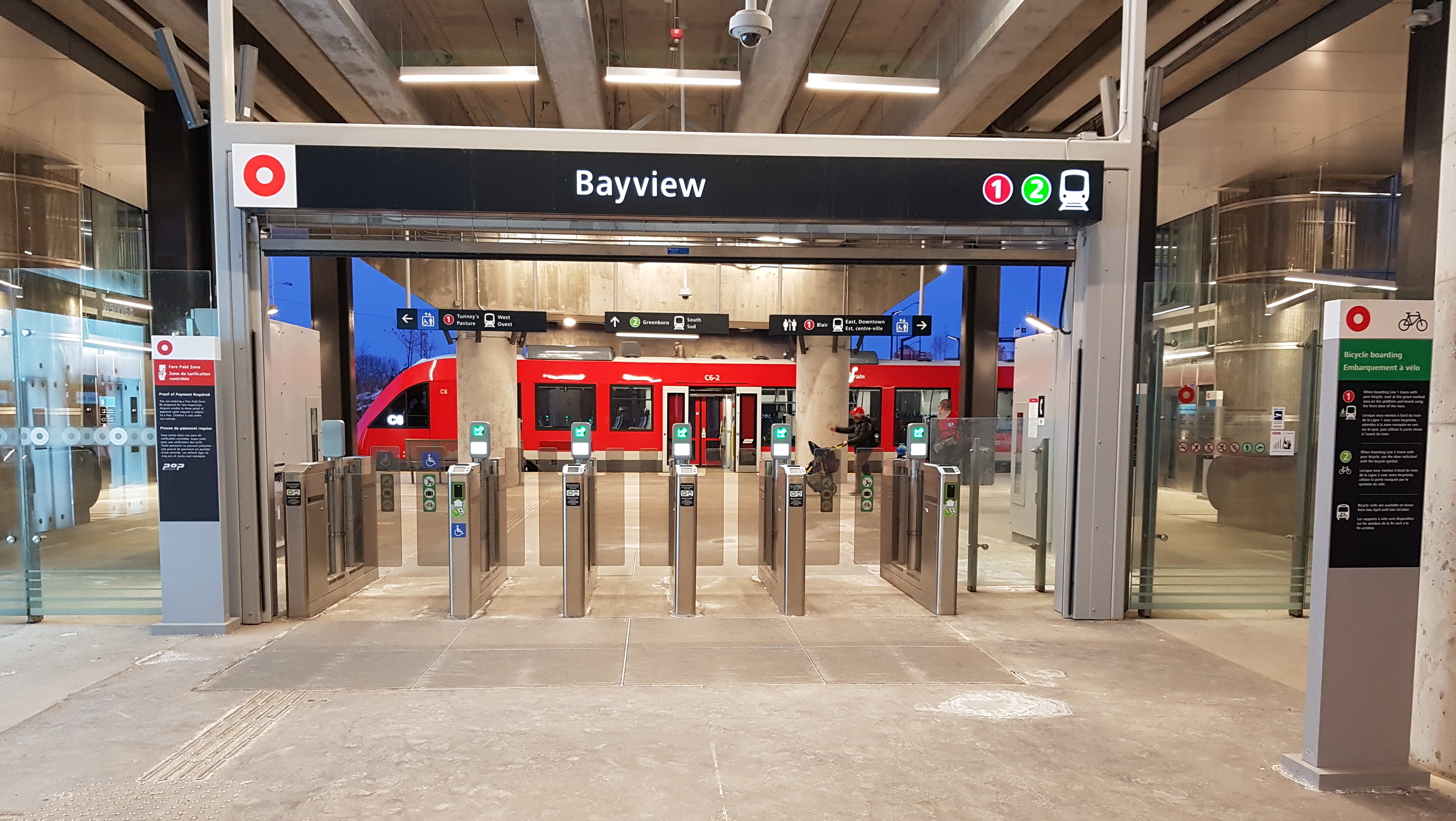
Bayview is an interchange station that serves Line 1 and Line 2.

Extending the Trillium Line across the Ottawa River into Gatineau across the Chief William Commanda Bridge had been proposed as early as the original pilot project proposal. The city's certificate of fitness for the Trillium Line, issued by the Canadian Transportation Authority in 2001, indicates that it operates between the provinces of Ontario and Quebec, despite the line never having actually operated across the river. The city even considered converting the rail bridge into a pedestrian crossing at one point. When the city announced the contract awards for Stage 2, it also presented a map of the O-Train network that included proposed extensions that would be a part of a Stage 3 phase, including extensions to Kanata, Barrhaven, and Gatineau. On September 24, 2019, the cities of Ottawa and Gatineau jointly announced that they no longer intended to use the Chief William Commanda Bridge for any kind of rail connection, citing capacity concerns at Bayview station. The bridge was later opened in September 2023 as a multi-use pedestrian pathway.

== Stations ==
Former name and logo of Line 2

As of 2019, ticket barriers are installed and operational in all Line 2 stations. They were initially installed in all stations except for Bayview in order to test the hardware and software of the fare gate system before it was installed in all thirteen stations on Line 1.

The Line 2 stations have large, bus-style sheltered waiting areas for passengers. All stations have level boarding platforms to allow for wheelchair access and easier boarding for all passengers. Elevators are available at Greenboro (for Transitway riders), Dow's Lake (for Line 2 riders) and Bayview (for train transfers within the fare-paid zone).

Line 2 (Trillium Line)
Station	Opened	Notes
Bayview	2001	Interchange with Line 1 (Confederation Line) in a fare-paid zone. Northbound terminus for Line 2.
Corso Italia	2025	The southern end of the northern double tracked segment
Dow's Lake	2001	South of this station, the train enters a tunnel to pass under Dow's Lake.
Carleton	2001	Serves Carleton University. This station had the only passing loop along the line until 2013.
Mooney's Bay	2001	Originally known as "Confederation" from 2001 until 2017
Walkley	2025	Out-of-station transfer to the Walkley Transitway station
Greenboro	2001	Provides an interchange with the Transitway and has a park and ride lot
South Keys	2025	Cross-platform transfer to Line 4 and connection to the existing Transitway station
Leitrim	2025	Includes a park and ride lot. Northern end of the southern double tracked segment.
Bowesville	2025	Includes a park and ride lot
Limebank	2025	Southbound terminus for Line 2

== Rolling stock ==
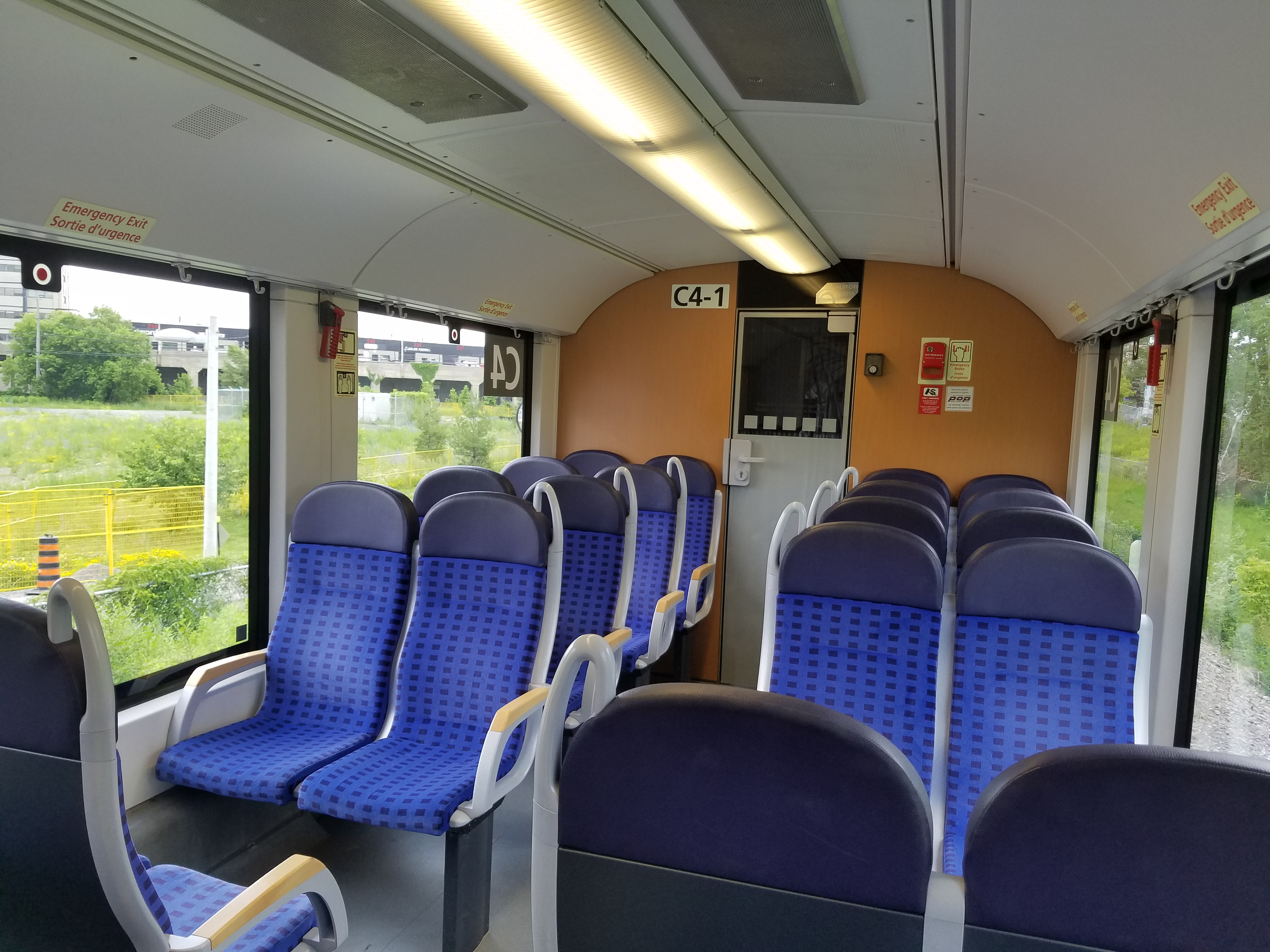
Interior of Alstom Coradia LINT 41

The Trillium Line initially used three Bombardier Talent diesel multiple unit (DMU) trains for service. Each train (numbered C1–C3) consisted of three cars, with the front and rear powered and the centre towed. The trains were originally ordered by Deutsche Bahn and later delivered to OC Transpo. After being retired in 2015, the units were put up for auction multiple times but a deal to sell the vehicles was never successfully established. They are now slated to be scrapped.

In September 2011, Alstom announced that in 2013, it would deliver six new two-car Coradia LINT train sets; a model originally designed for the European market. The trains were handed over to OC Transpo in June 2013. These trains were put into service on March 2, 2015, and the Bombardier Talent units were subsequently retired.

On May 3, 2018, it was announced that the city would be purchasing seven new Stadler FLIRT trains to use on the extended Trillium Line after the completion of Stage 2. These trains are approximately 81 metres (266 ft) long, which is double the 42-metre (138 ft) length of the current Coradia LINT trains. The new trains operate alongside coupled pairs of the existing LINT trains on the main line as part of a mixed fleet. These vehicles were manufactured in Switzerland before being transported to Canada for final assembly. The trains have a diesel-electric drive with the possibility of future electrification. The first FLIRT vehicle was delivered on October 7, 2021, and began testing on the weekend of January 15, 2022.

Class	Image	Type	Number of doors	Number	Built	Years of service
Bombardier Talent BR643		DMU	3 per side	3 three-car sets (9 cars total)	1999	Trillium Line (2001–2015)
Alstom Coradia LINT 41		DMU	2 per side	6 two-car pairs (12 cars total)	2013	Trillium Line (2015–present); Line 4 (2025–present)
Stadler FLIRT3		DEMU	8 per side	7 four-car sets (28 cars total, not including power packs)	2021	Trillium Line (2025–present)

== Facilities ==
Train sets are stored at the Walkley Yard located northeast of the Greenboro station. Before their retirement, the Bombardier Talent trainsets were maintained by Bombardier Transportation at the Walkley facilities. Bombardier continues to perform maintenance of the Line 2 fleet, which included standstill maintenance of the retired Bombardier Talent trains until March 8, 2018. The Walkley Yard was built in 1955 by the National Capital Commission for the Canadian National Railways and later sold to the Canadian Pacific Railway. The yard has enclosed buildings for repairs and outdoor storage tracks.

As part of the Stage 2 project, a new maintenance facility was built adjacent and to the west of the old facilities. The construction of the new yard facilities began in 2019.

== See also ==
- Letsgomoose
- Urban rail transit in Canada
- Light rail in North America
- List of tram and light rail transit systems § North America
- Chief William Commanda Bridge
- Rapibus
