= Corso Italia station =

Railway station in Ottawa, Ontario, Canada

Corso Italia
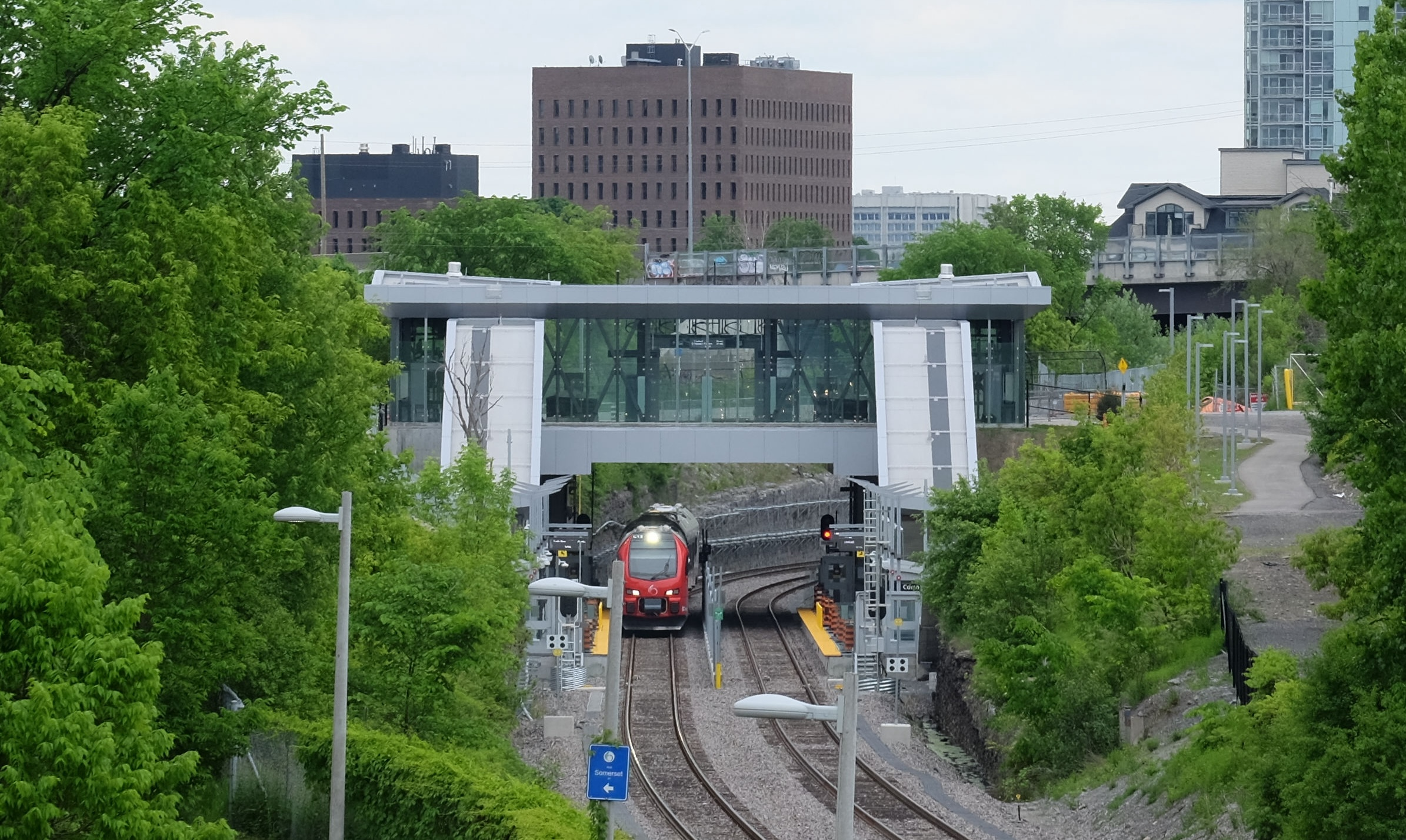
- Corso Italia from Somerset Street

General information
- Coordinates: 45°24′15″N 75°42′52″W
- Owner: OC Transpo
- Platforms: Side platforms
- Tracks: 2

Construction
- Structure type: Trenched
- Cycle facilities: Bicycle shelter
- Accessible: Yes

History
- Opened: January 6, 2025

Services
Preceding station	OC Transpo	Following station
Bayview Terminus	Line 2	Dow's Lake toward Limebank
Location

Corso Italia station is a station on O-Train Line 2 in Ottawa, Ontario. It services Ottawa's Little Italy neighbourhood. It was constructed as part of the Stage 2 O-Train expansion and opened on January 6, 2025, along with the rest of the reopened Line 2, which closed on May 3, 2020, for the extension of the line. The station has two side platforms and is located north of Gladstone Avenue, near Preston Street.

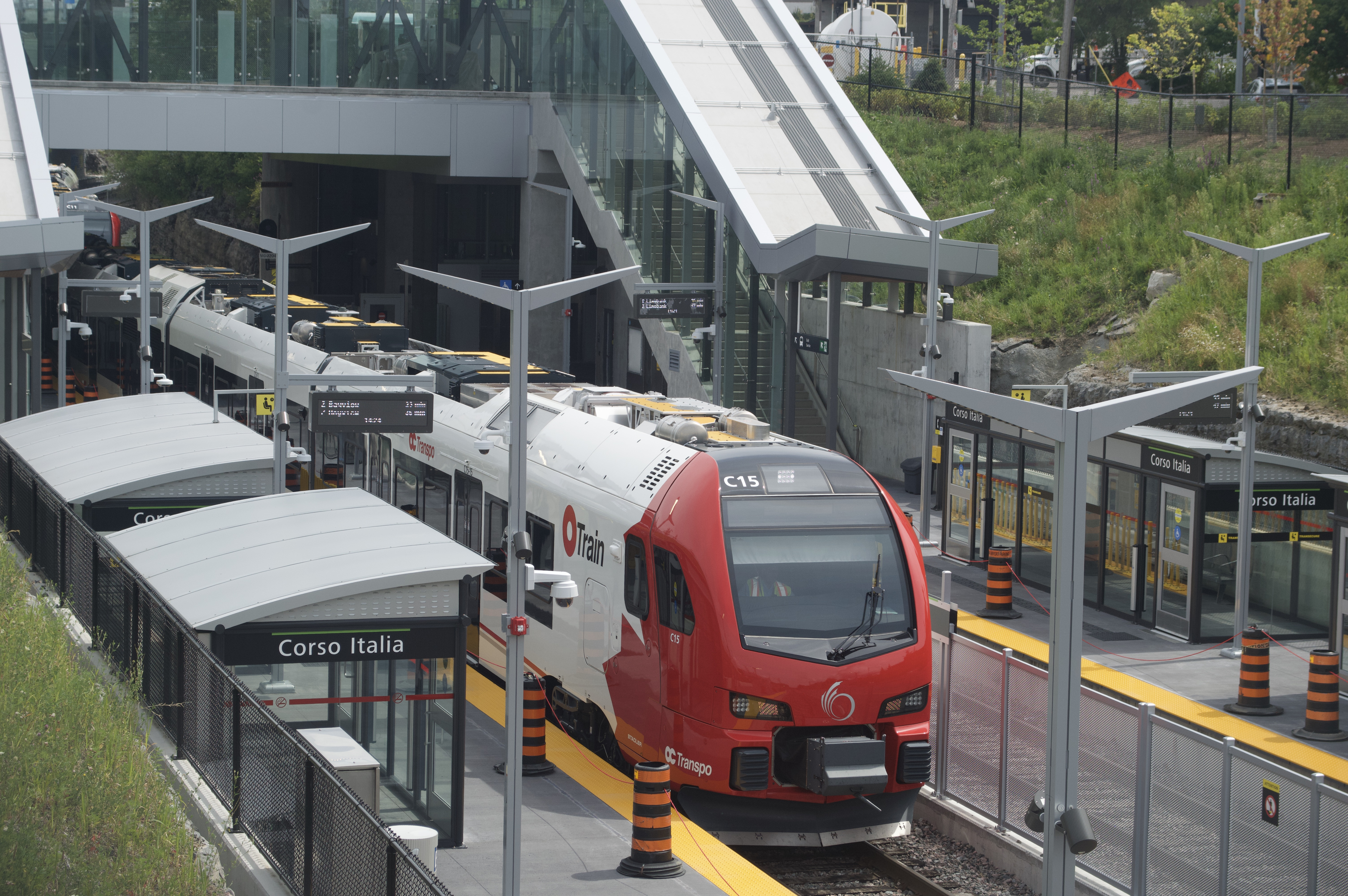
An OC Transpo Stadler FLIRT arrives at the Corso Italia O-Train station

== History ==
Corso Italia station was originally planned to be part of the initial Trillium Line which opened in 2001, but was cut for budgetary reasons before being added in the Stage 2 South expansion. A passing loop was added in 2013 to increase train frequency and line capacity. The station was known as Gladstone station during development.

== Service ==
The following service is planned for Corso Italia station upon implementation of New Ways to Bus in April 2025.

Corso Italia station future service
O-Train (North)	Line 2 (O-Train)
O-Train (South)	Line 2 (O-Train)
A (Gladstone Ave.)	14
B (Gladstone Ave.)	14
C (Preston St.)	8
D (Preston St.)	8
