= Walkley Yard =

Rail yard in Canada

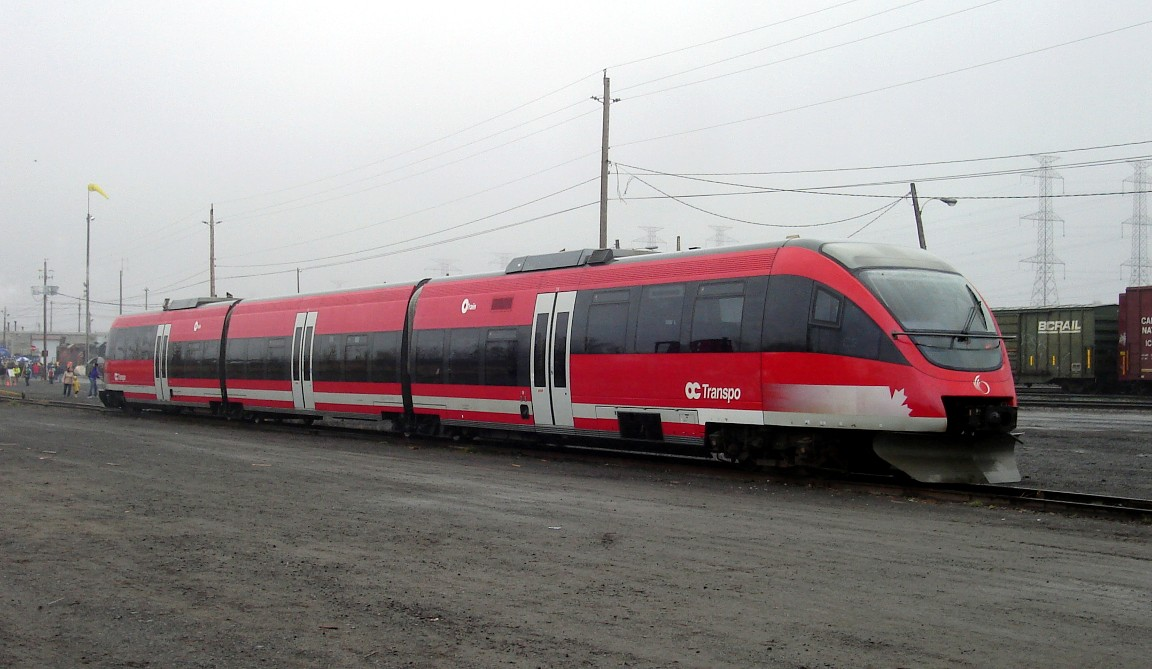

General information
- Location: 3101 Albion Road North
- Coordinates: 45°22′08″N 75°38′45″W
- System: O-Train maintenance facility
- Owner: City of Ottawa and Canadian National Railway
- Lines: Line 2, Line 4
- Tracks: 3

Construction
- Structure type: 2 at-grade sheds

History
- Opened: 1955
- Rebuilt: 2001
Location

Albion Yard

General information
- Location: 3170 Albion Road South
- Coordinates: 45°21′55.5156″N 75°39′10.7064″W
- System: O-Train maintenance facility
- Owner: City of Ottawa and Canadian National Railway
- Lines: Line 2, Line 4
- Tracks: 3

History
- Opened: 2024
Location

Walkley Yard was built in 1955 at a size of 129 acres and 9000 feet in length by the National Capital Commission to relocate the Canadian National Railway yard, to make way for construction of the Queensway. The northerly part was later acquired by Canadian Pacific Railway in 1967, when they moved from LeBreton Flats. An OC Transpo facility was added to the northern portion of the yard in 2001 to allow indoor servicing for the O-Train Trillium Line's diesel-powered fleet. The Canadian National Railway still occupy the southerly portion of the freight yard.

Canadian National Railway ran operations out of the Walkley Yard from August 1955 until 1998 when Ottawa Central Railway took over as a short line. The Last Trans-Con freight train ran through the yard in November 1995. Shortly after, the Beachburg Sub rail was pulled from Pembroke to North Bay. CNR purchased the yard and lines in 2008 and continues to operate out of the yard for a few remaining customers in the area. The yard is often used for car storage.

In 2022, Ottawa city council approved the purchase of the former Canadian Pacific areas of the yard.

== See also ==
- Belfast Yard
- Corkstown Yard
