= Bayview station (Ottawa) =

Light metro station in Ottawa, Canada

Bayview
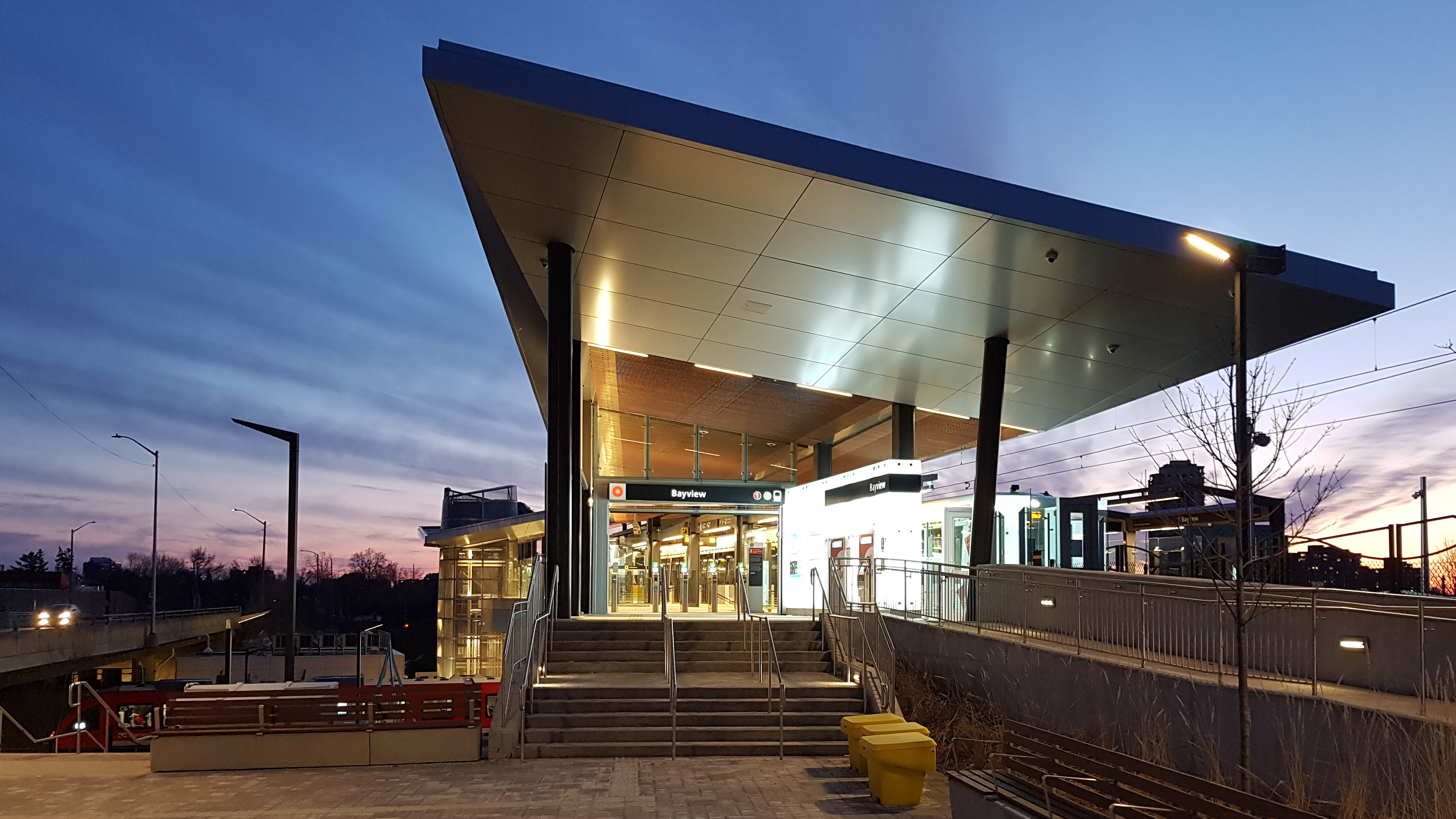
- Bayview station entrance to Line 1 eastbound

General information
- Coordinates: 45°24′34″N 75°43′19″W
- Platforms: Side platforms
- Tracks: 4

Construction
- Parking: No
- Cycle facilities: Yes
- Accessible: Yes

History
- Opened: October 15, 2001 (Line 2); September 14, 2019 (Line 1)
- Rebuilt: 2020–2025 (Line 2)

Services
Preceding station	OC Transpo	Following station
Tunney's Pasture Terminus	Line 1	Pimisi toward Blair
Terminus	Line 2	Corso Italia toward Limebank
Location

Bayview station is an O-Train light rail station on Line 1 and Line 2 in Ottawa, Ontario, Canada.

== History ==
Bayview station opened on October 15, 2001, as the northern terminus of the O-Train (now known as O-Train Line 2). An infill station on the Transitway between Tunney's Pasture and LeBreton (now Pimisi), with a pair of elevated bus platforms at the western end of Albert Street, opened the same day. Paved asphalt footpaths connected the two stops on opposite sides of the Transitway and the train platform.

On January 17, 2016, the transitway platforms closed for conversion to light rail, with all buses diverting via Albert Street. The station reopened on September 14, 2019, as an intermediate stop on the first phase of the Confederation Line, making Bayview an important rapid transit transfer point.

On September 16, 2017, the eastbound bus stop of Bayview station was moved 300m west to facilitate the construction of the Trinity Development at 900 Albert Street.

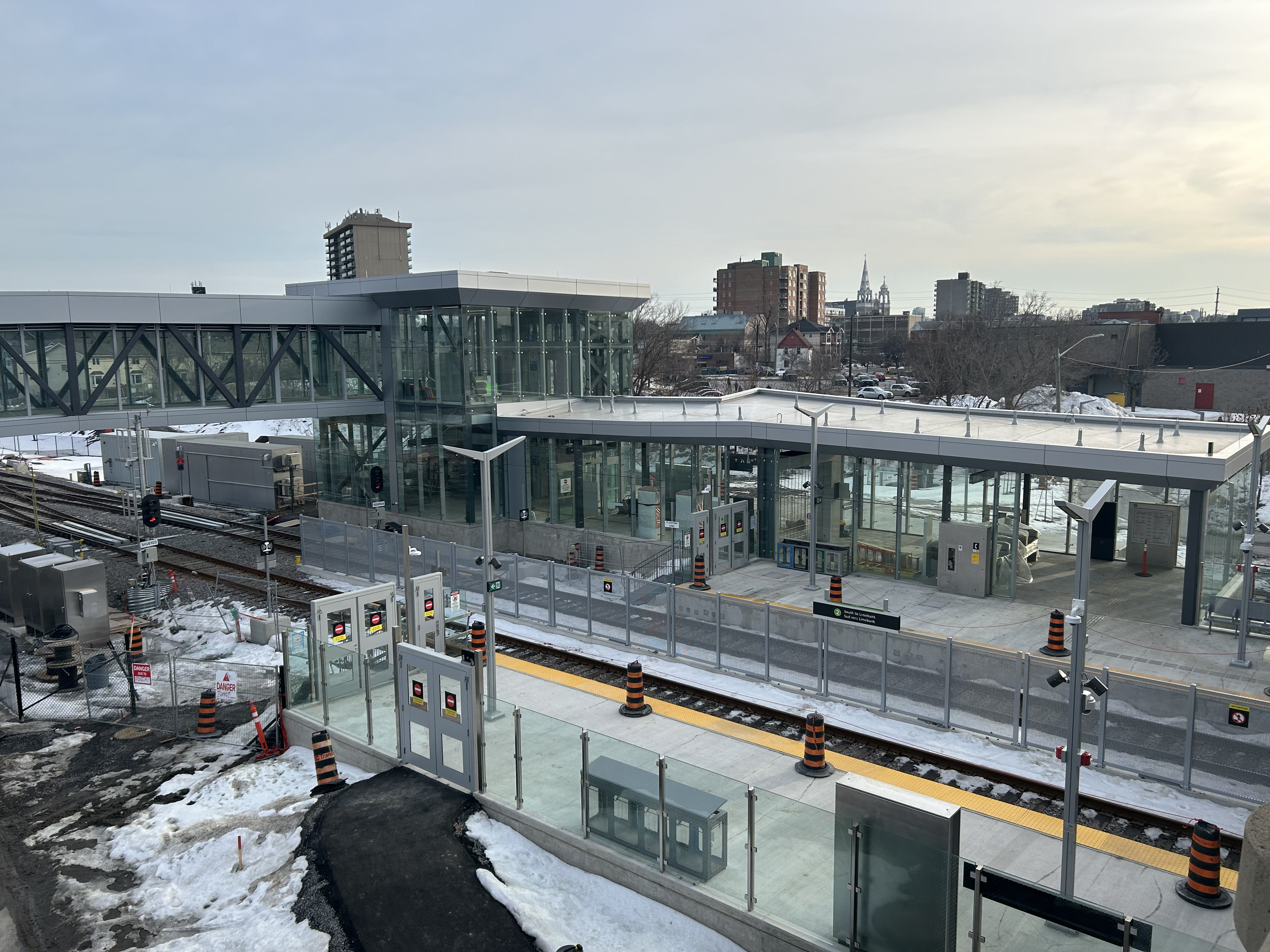
Platforms and pedestrian bridge at Bayview, built during Stage 2 construction

During the reconstruction of the station, the original Line 2 O-Train station was closed and a new platform was constructed to the north, underneath the Line 1 station.

During the Stage 2 south expansion, the original Line 2 platform was extended to accommodate the longer trains that would be used on the line, and a second platform was added for operational flexibility. A pedestrian bridge was also constructed from east to west over the Line 2 platforms, intended to connect with the future development at 900 Albert.

== Location ==
The station, named for the nearby Bayview Road (now Bayview Station Road), is on Albert St. close to Tom Brown Arena (sport facility), and the neighbourhoods of Hintonburg, Little Italy, and Mechanicsville. It is intended as a catalyst for large redevelopment including condos, hotels and the city's future tallest office and residential tower at 900 Albert. In 2016 a 1940s warehouse in the area was converted into an "innovation hub".

== Layout ==
The Line 1 station is an elevated side platform station. A ticket barrier at platform level on the south (eastbound) platform provides access to Albert Street. Under the station, a concourse connects the two platforms with the single Line 2 platform, and also contains a ticket barrier giving access to a footpath connecting the built-up area south of the station with the greenspace to its north. As part of the Stage 2 Trillium Line expansion, the existing Line 2 platform was extended to accommodate longer trains. A second track and platform was also built to the east of the existing tracks.

The station features two artworks: Cascades by Pierre Poussin, a set of two large sculptures located in the greenspace surrounding the station, and As the Crow Flies by Adrian Göllner, a linear sculpture running atop the barrier between the two tracks on the Line 1 platform level.

== Service ==
The following routes serve Bayview as of March 29, 2025. Bus stops at Bayview are located outside of the O-Train fare-paid zone.

Key
Line 1 (O-Train) Line 2 (O-Train) Line 4 (O-Train)	O-Train
E1	Shuttle Express
R1 R2 R4	O-Train replacement bus routes
N75	Night routes
40 12	Frequent routes
99 162	Local routes
275	Connexion routes
303	Shopper routes
405	Event routes
646	School routes
STO	Société de transport de l'Outaouais routes
Additional info: Line 1: Confederation Line; Line 2: Trillium Line; Line 4: Airport Link; Routes 5 to 199: Custom routing that that connects to Line 1 and/or 2; Routes 200 to 299: Connexion (peak-period only routes that connect to the O-Train); Routes 301 to 305: Shopper Routes (limited rural service); Routes 404 to 406: Canadian Tire Centre events; Routes 450 to 456: Lansdowne Park events; Routes 600 to 699: School Routes; Route R1: replaces Line 1 when it is out of service; Route R2: replaces Line 2 when it is out of service; Route R4: replaces Line 4 when it is out of service; Routes N39 to N98: night service (replaces Line 1 and N98 replaces Line 4); White backgrounds: limited service; Last two digits represent service area: 00s and 10s – Central; 20s – Gloucester; 30s – Orléans; 40s – Ottawa East; 50s – Ottawa West; 60s – Kanata, Stittsville; 70s – Barrhaven; 80s – Nepean; 90s – South Keys

Stop	Routes
O-Train (east)	Line 1 (O-Train)
O-Train (west)	Line 1 (O-Train)
O-Train (south)	Line 2 (O-Train)
A (Albert St. West)	R1 R2 12 13 N57 N61 N63 N75
B (Albert St. East)	R1 12 13 N57 N61 N63 N75

== Gallery ==
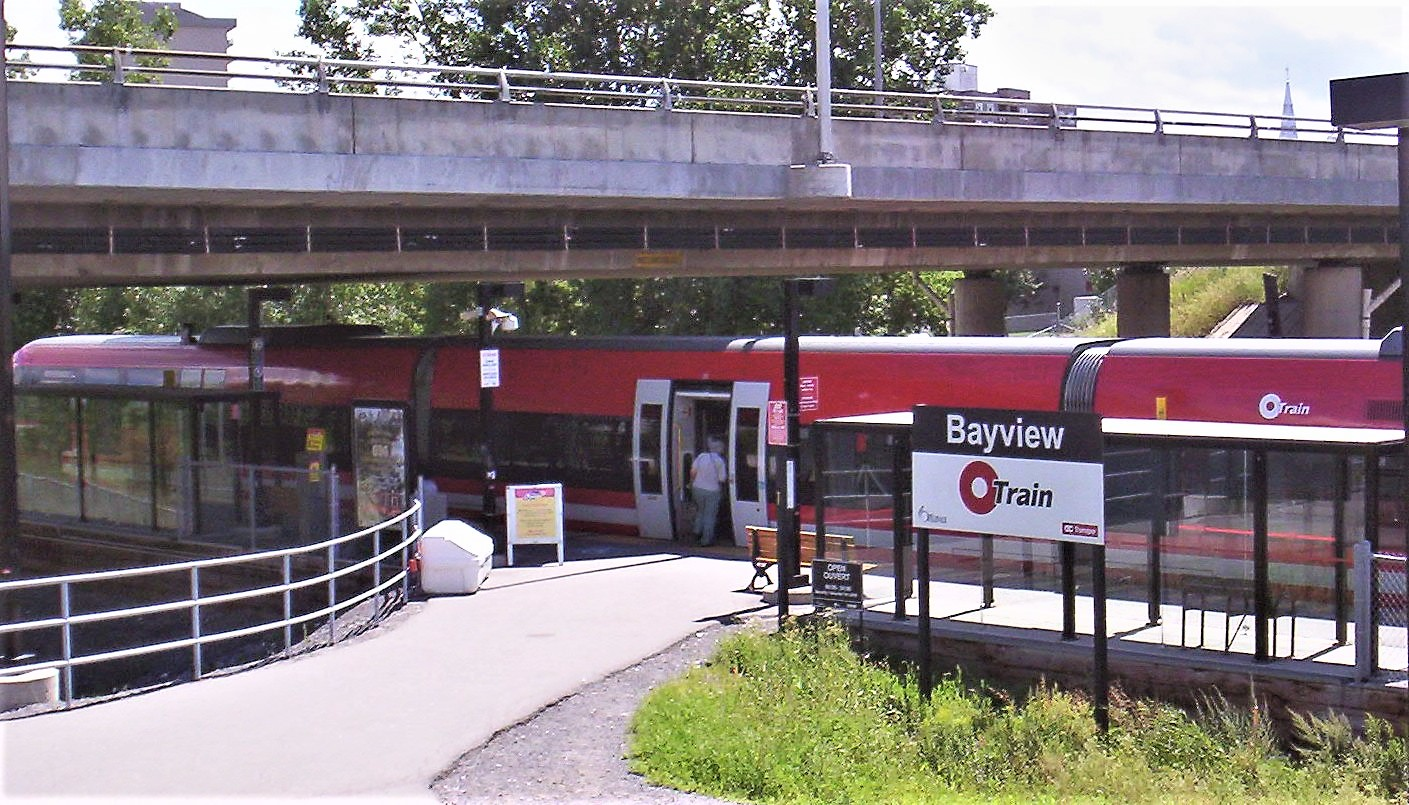
Bayview station in August 2005

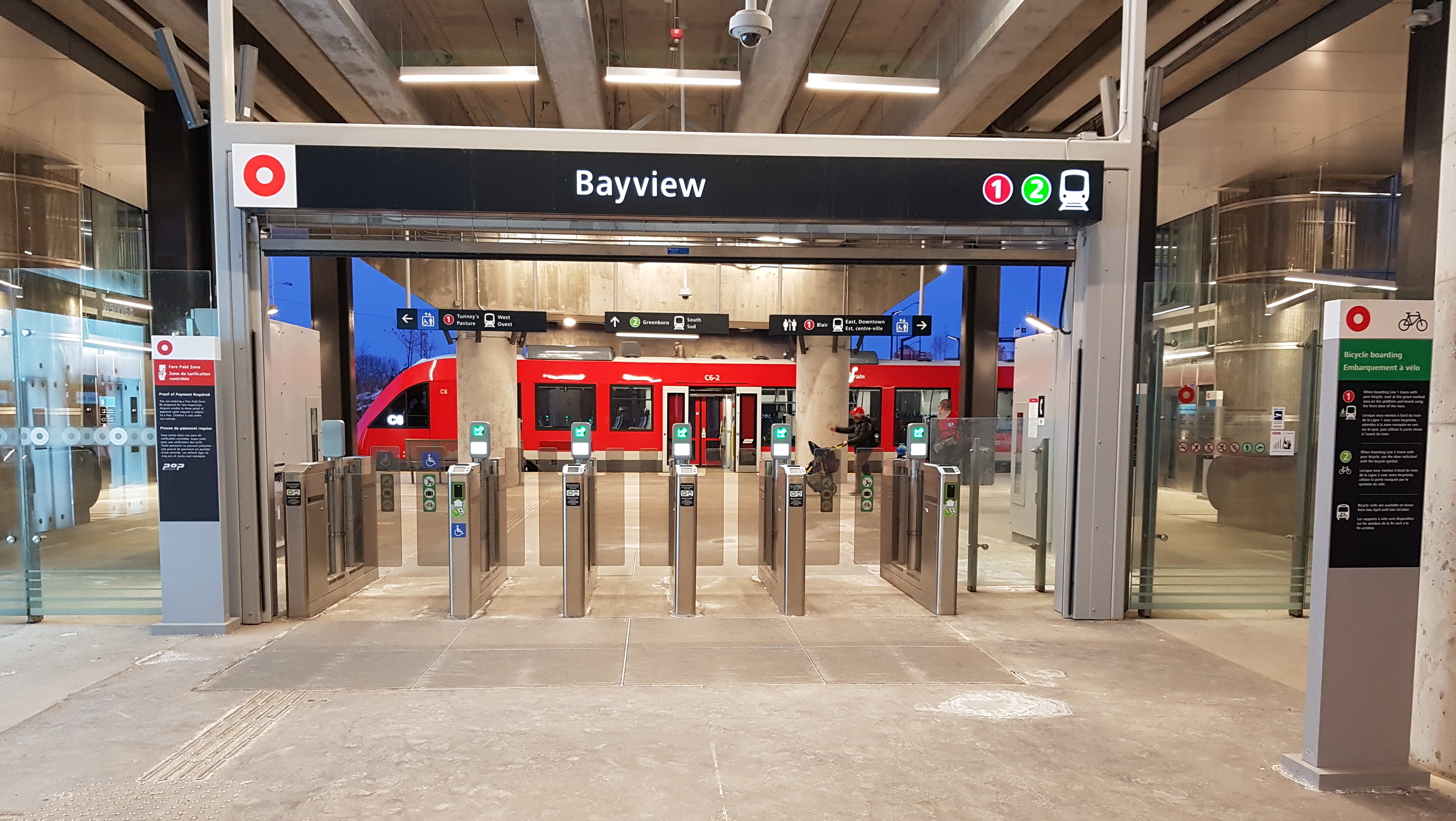
Bayview lower level in March 2020

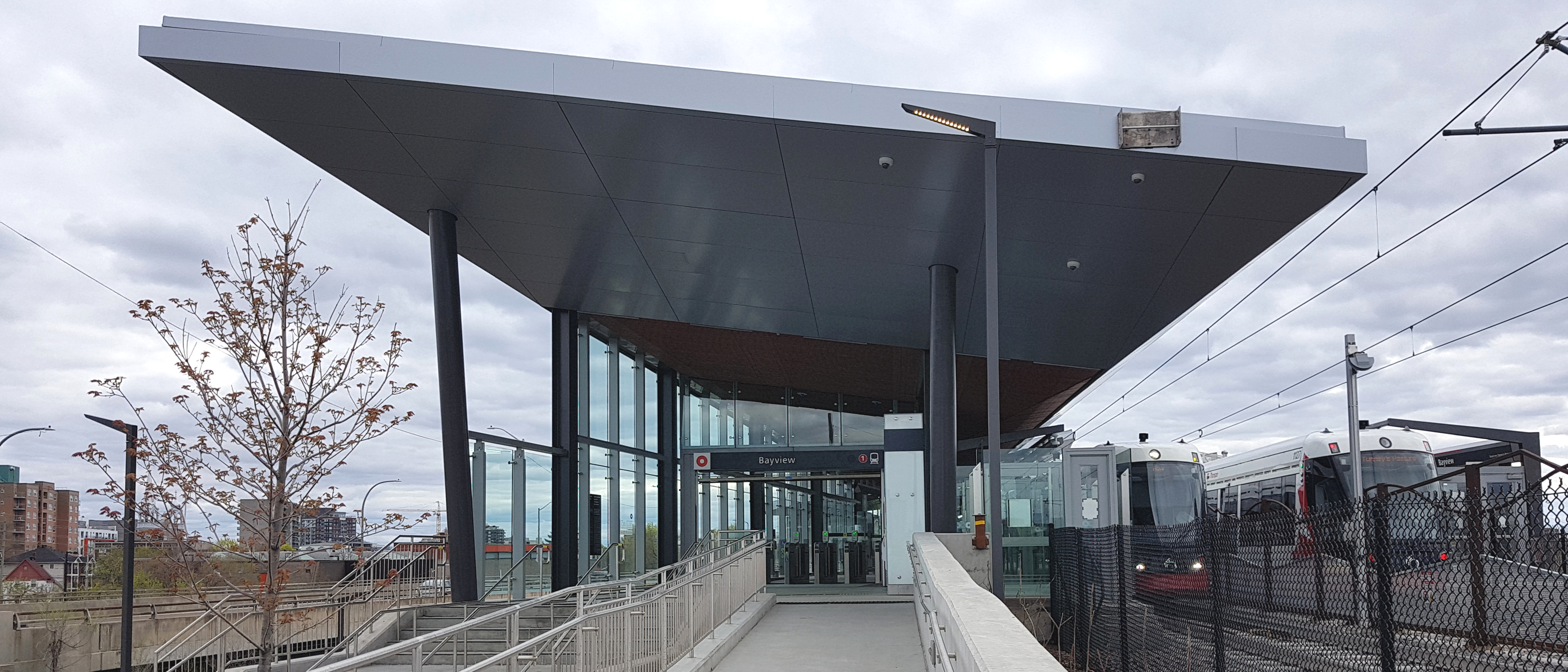
Bayview upper level in May 2020

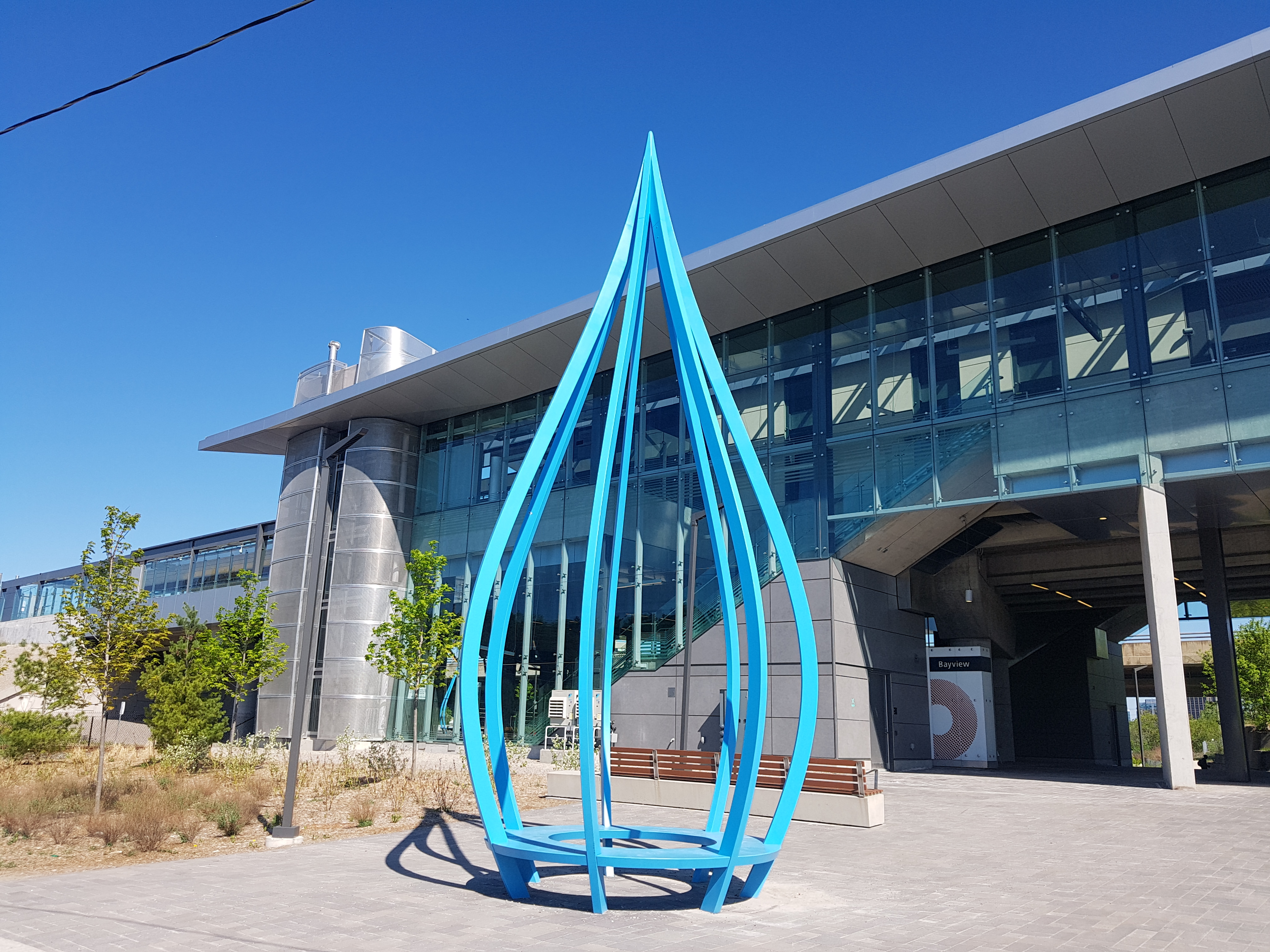
Cascades by Pierre Poussin near the Trillium Line entrance
