= Leitrim, Ontario =

Neighbourhood of Ottawa

Coordinates: 45°20′N 75°36′W

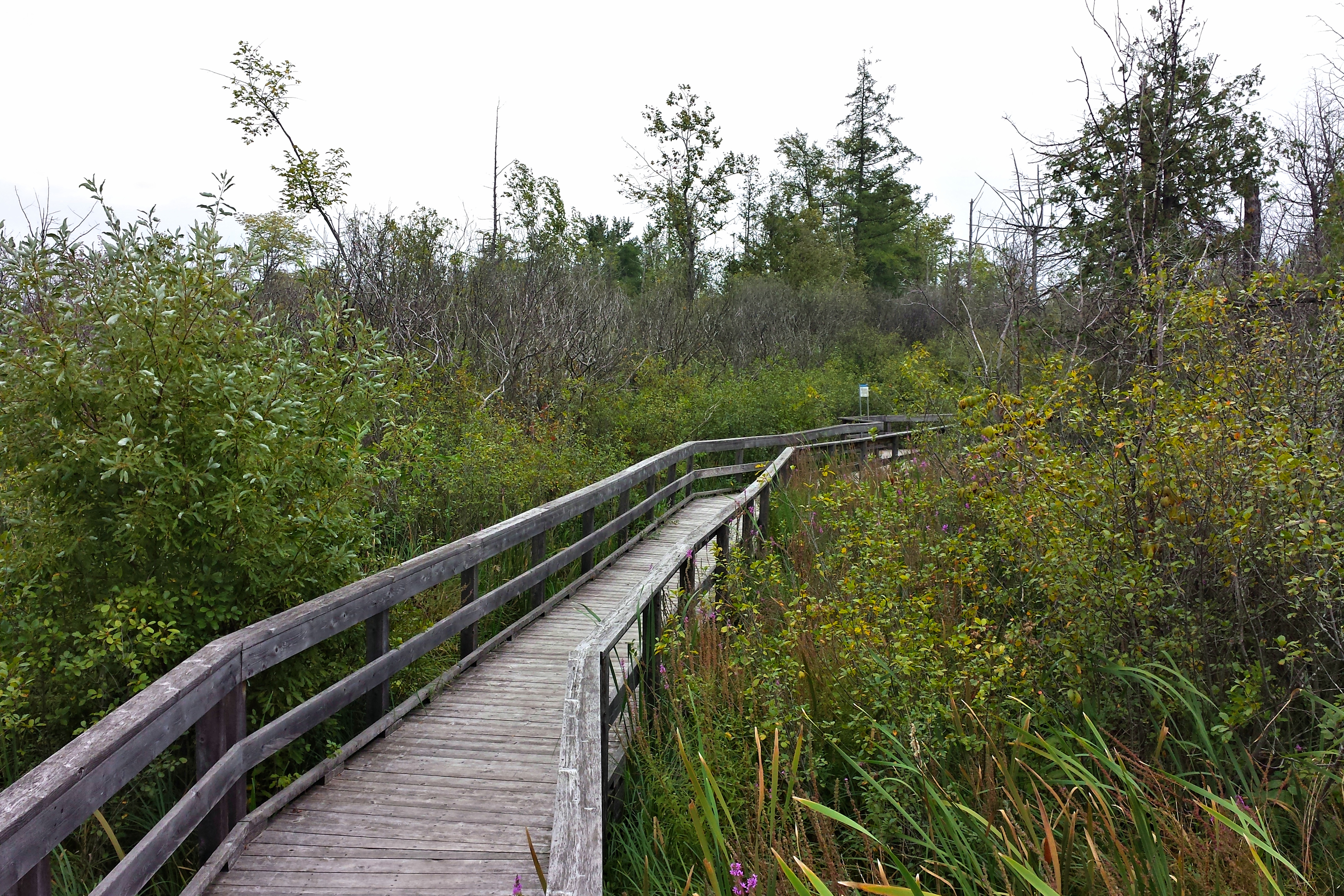
Findlay Creek Boardwalk in the Leitrim Wetlands

Leitrim (/ˈliːtrəm/ LEE-trəm) is a dispersed rural community in the South Gloucester section of Ottawa, Ontario, Canada, and is named for the Irish County Leitrim. The area comprises the rapidly growing Findlay Creek suburban neighbourhood.

The area is bounded by Leitrim Road to the north and Rideau Road to the south, generally between Bank Street on the east and Albion Road to the west. The community design plan outlines the development for the area in the coming years. Findlay Creek Village is currently the only area under development within this region. Southbrooke is another community planned within the area.

Located nearby are the Leitrim Wetlands, the Rideau Carleton Raceway, a storm water system and military intelligence gathering station CFS Leitrim.

In September 2005, OC Transpo bus route 144 (now Local Route 93) was extended from Blossom Park to serve the area. An extension of O-Train Line 2 to Leitrim station was cancelled in 2006, but opened in 2025.
