= Brown's Inlet =

Body of water in central Ottawa, Canada

Coordinates: 45.397365°N 75.688677°W

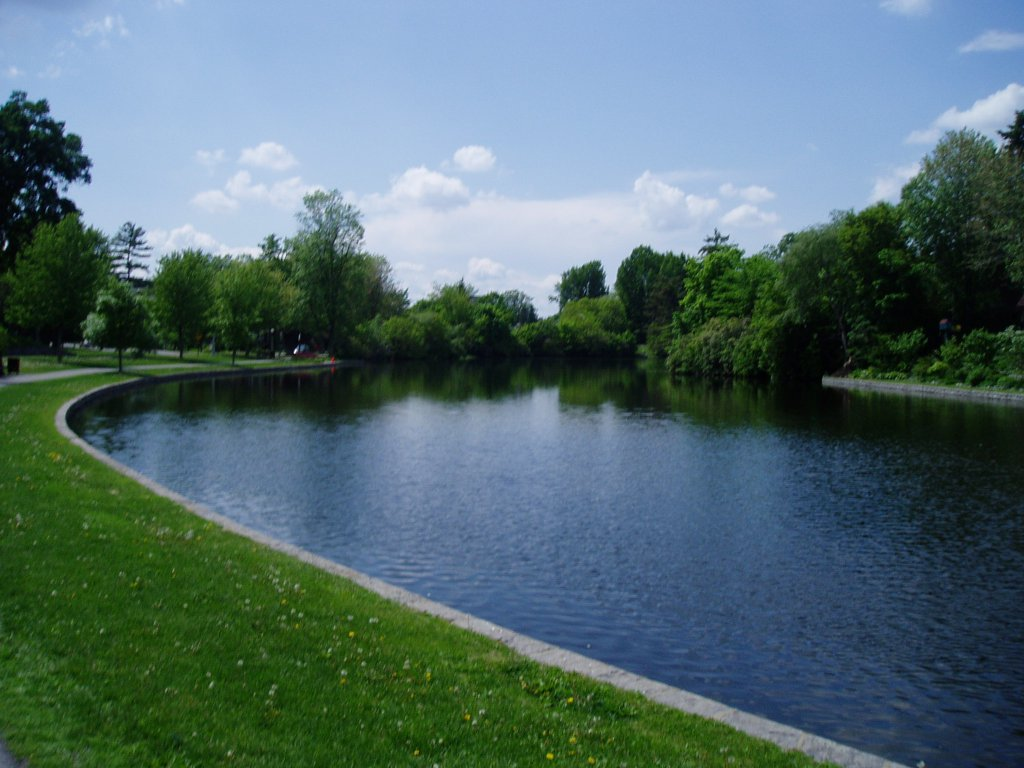
The southern pond of Brown's Inlet

Brown's Inlet is a body of water in central Ottawa. A former creek, it grew considerably in size with the creation of the Rideau Canal. Originally larger, the inlet was divided by Ralph Street; today it is split into 2 ponds connected by culverts. The inlet is in the southern part of the Glebe neighbourhood, emptying into the canal near the Bank Street Bridge. The two ponds of the inlet are surrounded by parks and homes. The ponds are home to a wide array of wild life including frogs, turtles, fish, and birds.

A sewer crosses through the pond, connecting Wilton Crescent to Broadway Avenue. Originally installed in the late 19th century, the sewer was renewed in 2025.
