= Bank Street Bridge =

Bridge in Ottawa, Canada

Coordinates: 45.3962°N 75.6847°W

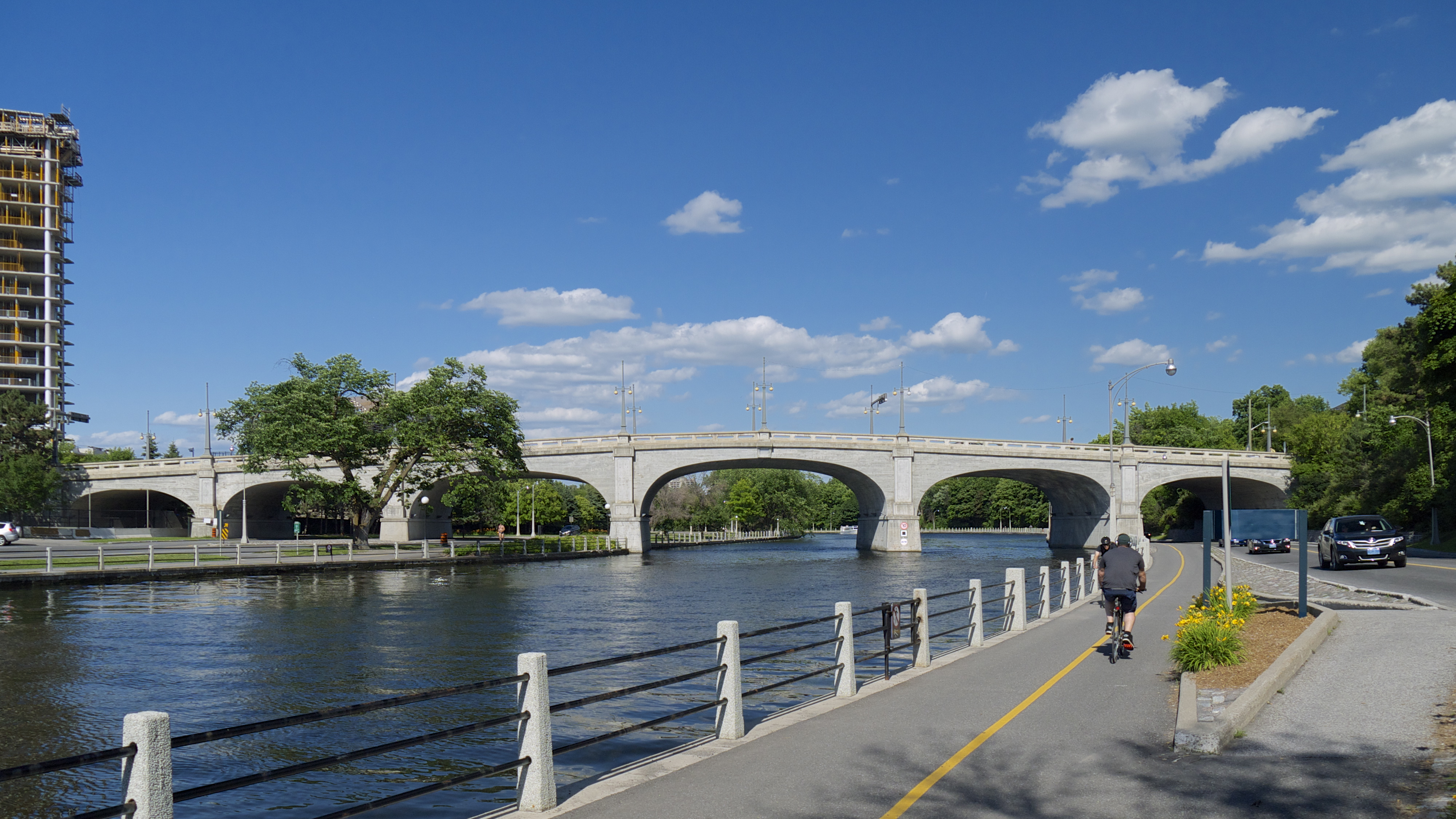
Bank Street Bridge in 2014

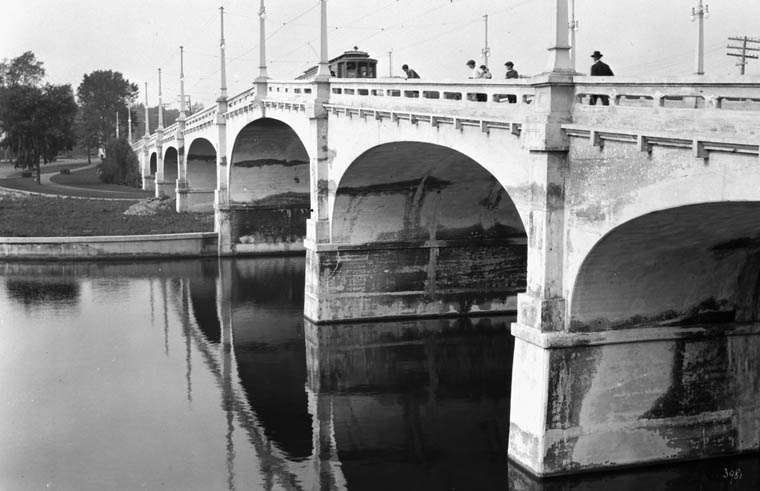
The bridge in 1916.

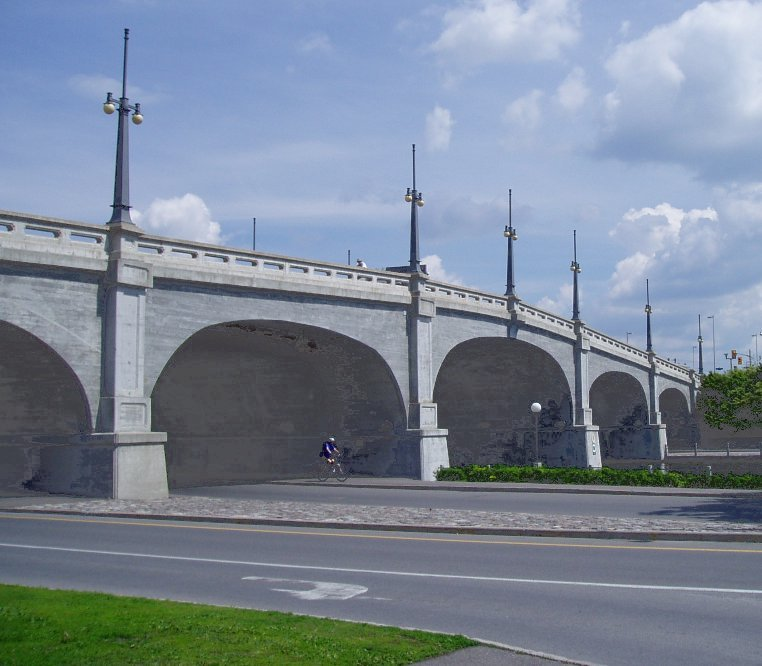
The bridge in 2005.

The Bank Street Bridge, officially known as the Bank Street Canal Bridge, is a bridge in Ottawa, Ontario, Canada, that carries Bank Street over the Rideau Canal. It links the Glebe to Old Ottawa South. It also passes over the Queen Elizabeth Driveway and Colonel By Drive.

A wooden bridge was first constructed in this location in 1866. A few years later, a steel swing bridge was built to better allow boats to pass through. The current structure was built in 1912, and was designed to be high enough to not have to open. By the 1970s, the bridge was falling apart, and trucks were banned in 1981. After some debate about whether to replace or restore the heritage structure, the bridge was fully restored in 1993.

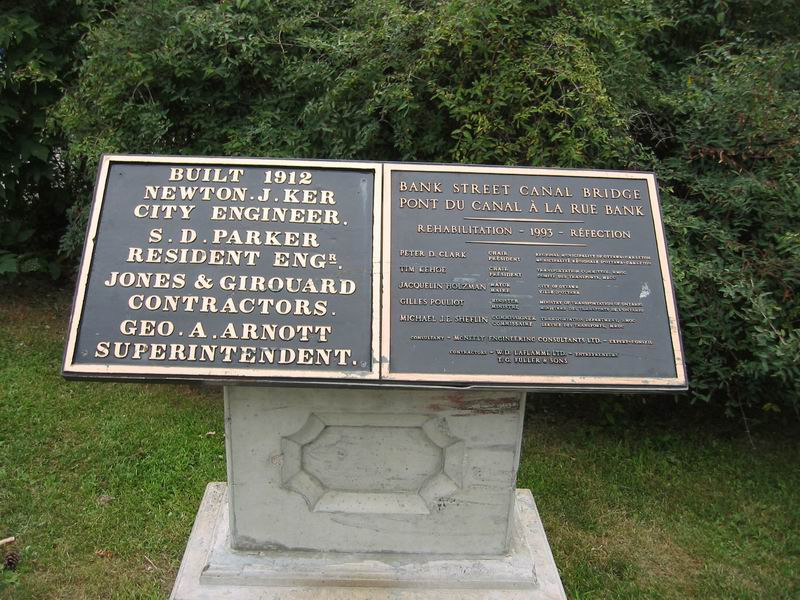
Plaque at North/West end of Bridge

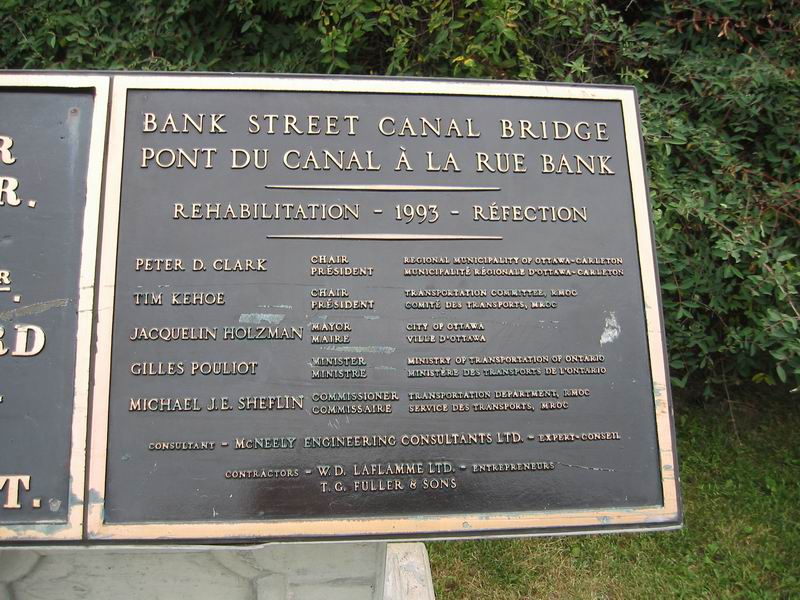
Close-up of right side

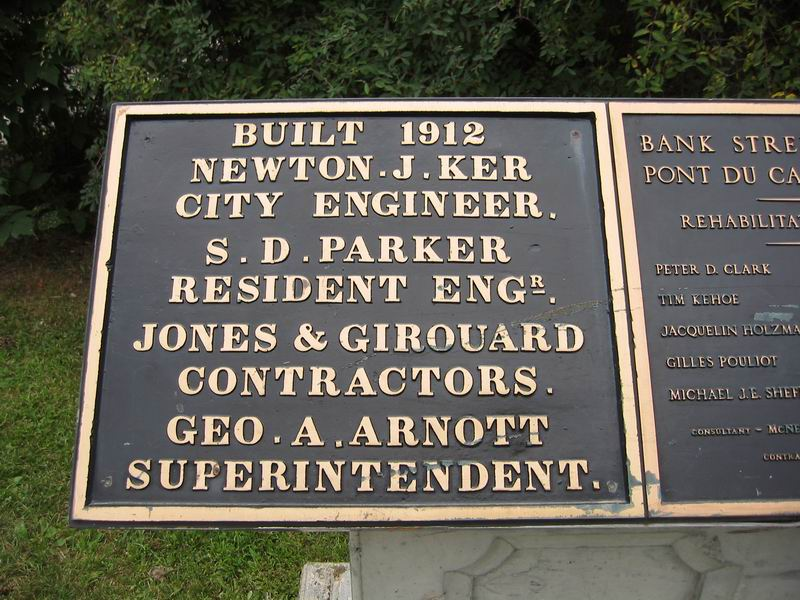
Close-up of left side
