= Mutchmor Public School =

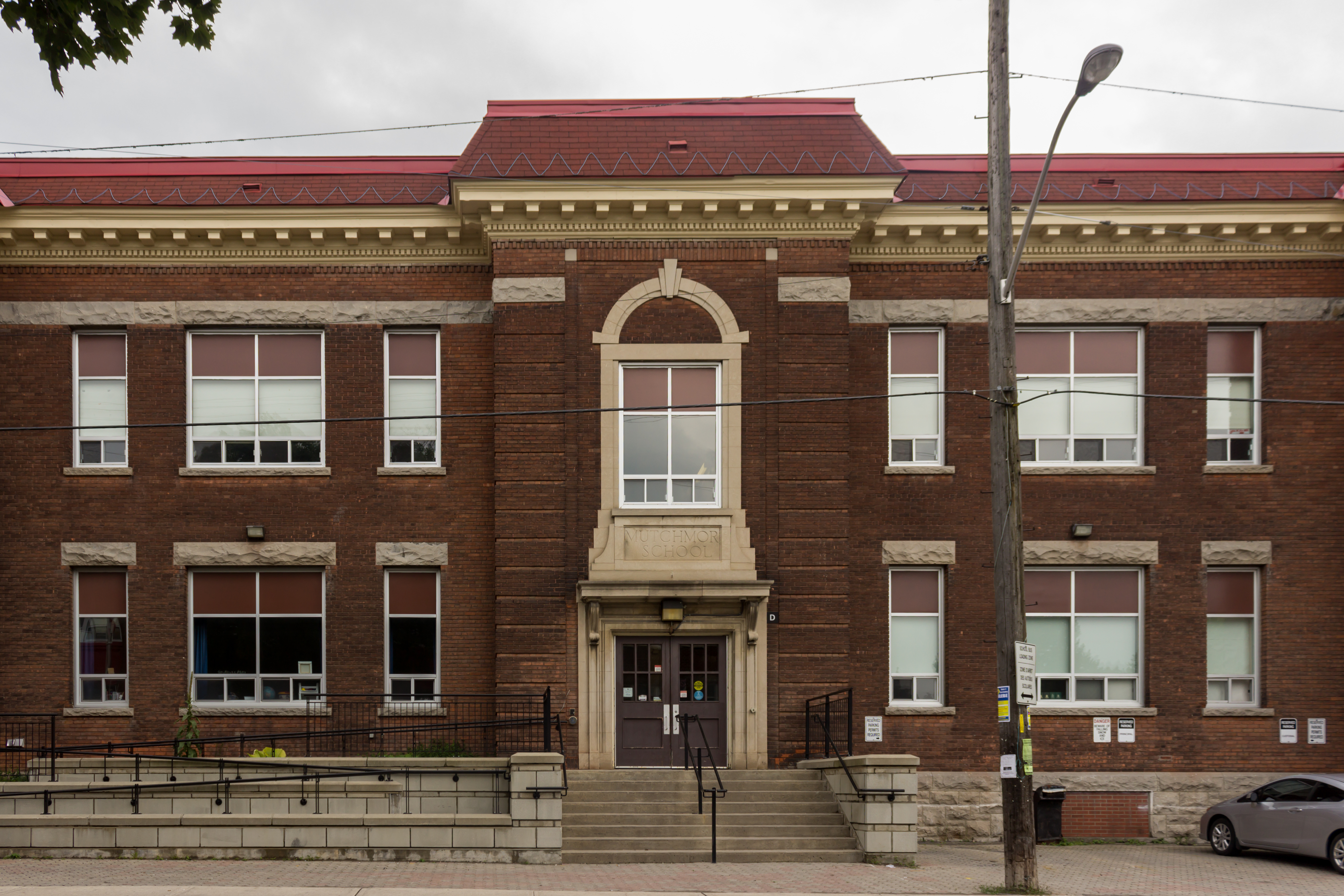

Location
- 185 Fifth Avenue; Ottawa, Ontario, K1S 2N1; Canada; 45.4009°N 75.6906°W

Information
- School type: English (core French), Middle French Immersion, Congregated Gifted
- Founded: 1895
- School board: Ottawa-Carleton District School Board
- Area trustee: Nili Kaplan-Myrth
- Principal: Sandy Miller
- Grades: JK-6
- Enrollment: 532 students (December 2015)
- Language: French Immersion

Mutchmor Public School is an elementary school in Ottawa, Ontario, Canada. It is located in The Glebe neighbourhood at the corner of Fifth Avenue and Lyon. It is run by the Ottawa-Carleton District School Board.

The school is home to over 500 students from junior kindergarten to grade six. Mutchmor is a French Immersion Centre. Students typically attend Glashan Public School for their middle school years and Glebe Collegiate Institute for their high school years.

== History ==
Mutchmor Street Public School, which was erected on December 23, 1895, is dedicated to John Mutchmor, military veteran of the War of 1812, an Upper Canada homesteader, and a farmer. Mutchmor Public School opened under the name Mutchmor Street Public School taking its name from the adjacent Mutchmor Street, which was later renamed Fifth Avenue.

The original portion of the school was built in 1895 making Mutchmor one of the oldest schools in Ottawa. Only two other schools built in Ottawa in the late nineteenth century remain, with nearby First Avenue Public School being one. Further additions were made to the school in 1911, 1920 and 2013. The building is officially designated as a heritage structure.

In the 1990s Mutchmor was threatened with closure by the school board. Action by the local community ensured that Mutchmor stayed open, and enrollment is growing steadily.

In 2005 Today's Parent magazine named Mutchmor one of the top 40 schools in Canada, highlighting how the school 'rose to the challenge'.
