= St. Giles Presbyterian Church (Ottawa) =

Church in Ottawa, Ontario

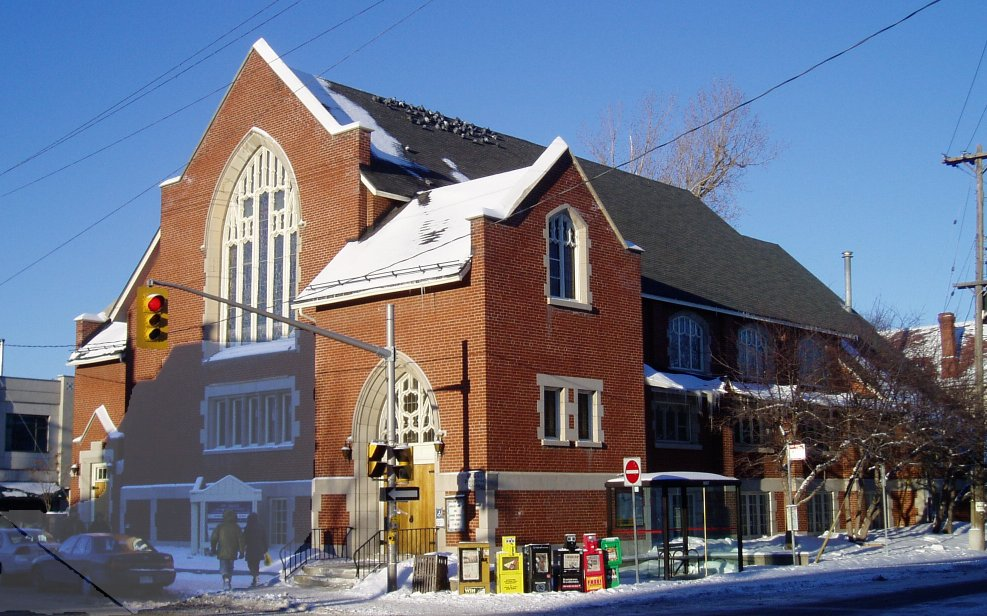
- St. Giles Presbyterian Church
- St. Giles Presbyterian Church
- 45.4047°N 75.6889°W
- Location: 729 Bank Street; Ottawa, Ontario; K1S 2G4
- Denomination: Presbyterian
- Website: stgilesottawa.org

Architecture
- Functional status: Active
- Architectural type: Norman-Gothic

St. Giles Presbyterian Church is a member of the Presbyterian Church in Canada, located in Ottawa, Ontario, Canada. It was formed in 1925 by a minority group from Glebe Presbyterian, and a few other congregations that did not support the vote to enter the United Church of Canada.

It is located on the northeast corner of Bank Street and First Avenue in the Glebe neighbourhood in Downtown Ottawa.

== History ==
St. Giles Presbyterian Church in Ottawa, Ontario, was established in 1925 by non-concurring Presbyterians from several Ottawa churches. The congregation started by opening a Sunday school on January 18, 1925, with 57 pupils. Soon after, they began holding worship services in the Seventh-day Adventist Church on Fifth Street. The Rev. Archibald G. Cameron was appointed by the Presbytery to guide the new congregation. On June 30, 1925, St. Giles was granted full congregational status. In February of 1928, the Rev. Archibald Cameron was inducted as the first minister. A new church building was constructed and dedicated on May 5, 1929. The congregation built a Christian Education Centre in 1955. Cushman Memorial Presbyterian Church (Hull, Quebec) amalgamated with St. Giles in June 1995.

The current St. Giles Presbyterian Church building, found at 181 First Avenue, was designed by architect John Pritchard MacLaren from 1927 to 1929. A hall and offices are found across the street from the church at 174 First Avenue, with a plaque naming it Logan-Vencta Hall. The building belonged to the church but was sold when it became surplus to needs. Erected by the church, a bronze plaque is dedicated to the members of the congregation who were killed or served during the Second World War.

== St. Giles' connection to John McCrae ==
In the Cushman Memorial Church remembrance area at the back of the sanctuary of St. Giles is an honour roll from Zion Presbyterian Church, Hull. Zion's wooden church was built in 1872. In 1924, it was replaced by Cushman Memorial Church. On the honour roll is listed Alexis Helmer. Lieutenant Helmer was killed at Ypres on May 2, 1915, at the age of 22. According to a witness, Helmer's friend Lieutenant-Colonel John McCrae began writing his iconic poem, In Flanders Field, in an attempt to compose himself following the burial.
