= Glebe Community Centre =

- Centre communautaire du Glebe
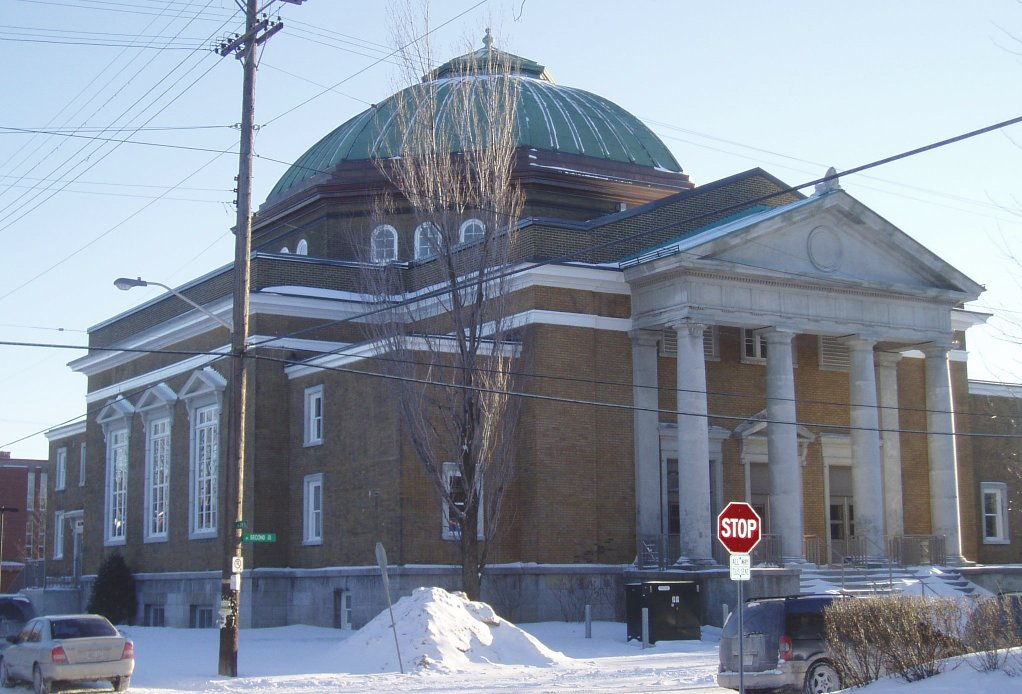
- Interactive map of the Glebe Community Centre area
- Former names: St. James Methodist Church; St. James United Church

General information
- Status: Completed
- Type: Community centre
- Architectural style: Palladian
- Location: 175 Third Avenue, Ottawa, Ontario, Canada
- Coordinates: 45.40218°N 75.69169°W
- Construction started: 1914
- Completed: 1924
- Renovated: 2004
- Owner: City of Ottawa

Design and construction
- Architect: Clarence Burritt

Website
- ottawa.ca/en/recreation-and-parks/recreation-facilities/facility-listing/glebe-community-centre

The Glebe Community Centre (French: Centre communautaire du Glebe) is a historic structure currently serving as a community centre for The Glebe neighbourhood in Ottawa, Ontario, Canada. Originally built as St. James Methodist Church, construction began in 1914 and took ten years. The church became St. James United Church in 1925 when the Methodist Church, Canada merged into the United Church of Canada. The massive Palladian style structure was designed by Clarence Burritt.

In the 1960s and 1970s church attendance declined and in 1973 the St. James congregation was merged with the nearby Glebe United Church, creating Glebe-St. James United Church. The St. James United Church building was bought by the City of Ottawa and converted into a community centre.

In the late 1990s, the city pushed to close the structure in favour of building a new community centre in Brewer Park that would serve both the Glebe and Old Ottawa South. Both communities protested this plan and it was scrapped. Instead, extensive renovations were undertaken, which were completed in October 2004.
