= Civic Hospital =

- Neighbourhood
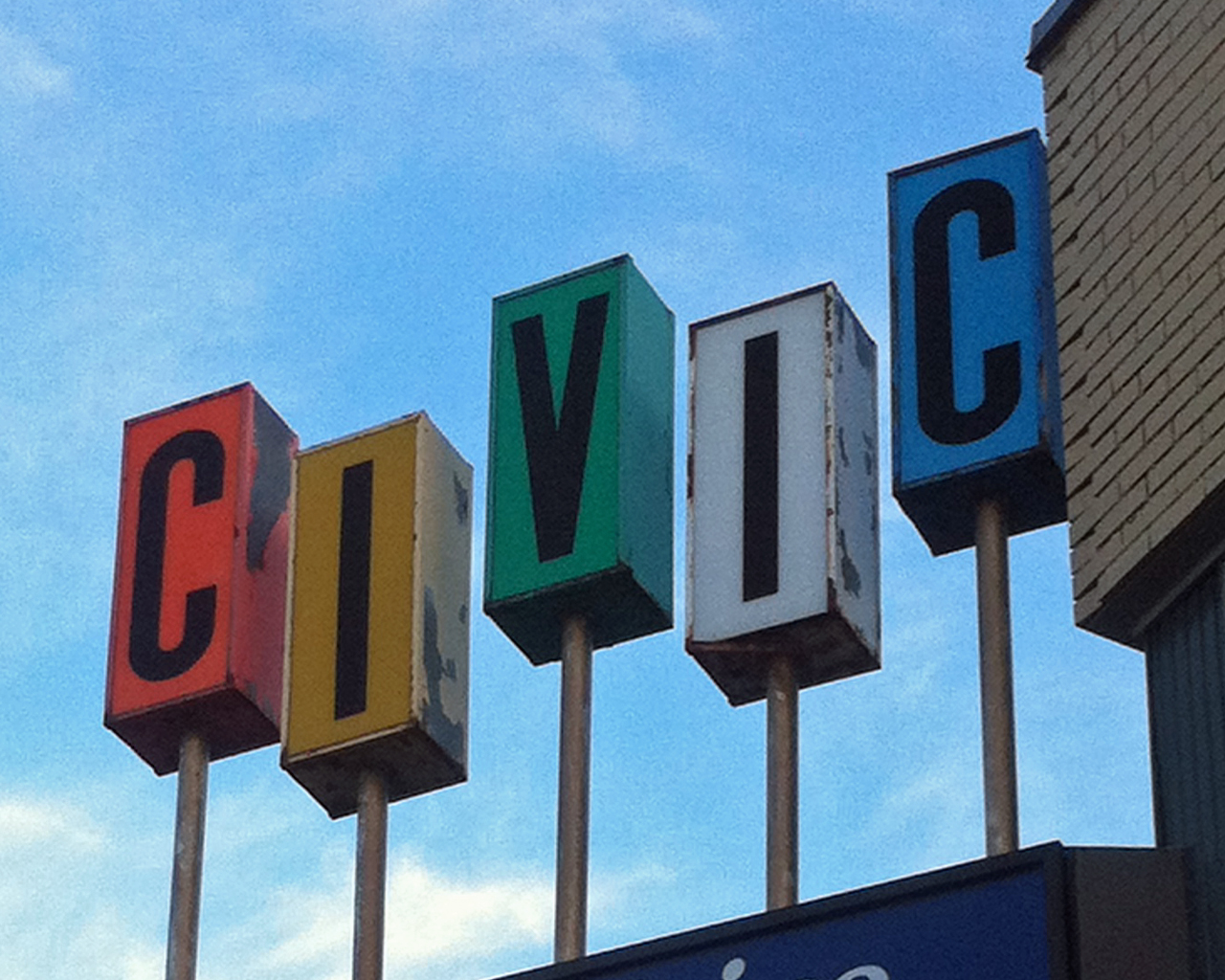
- The Civic Pharmacy Building sign is a neighbourhood landmark.

- Location within Ottawa
- Coordinates: 45.394°N 75.725°W
- Country: Canada
- Province: Ontario
- City: Ottawa

Government
  - MPs: Yasir Naqvi
  - MPPs: Joel Harden
  - Councillors: Jeff Leiper
  - Governing body: Civic Hospital Neighbourhood Association
  - President: Karen Wright

Area
  - Total: 1.27 km^{2} (0.49 sq mi)
- Elevation: 75 m (246 ft)

Population (Canada 2016 Census)
  - Total: 5,062
  - Density: 3,990/km^{2} (10,300/sq mi)
- Time zone: Eastern (EST)
- Forward sortation areas: K1S, K1Y
- Website: Neighbourhood Association

Civic Hospital (French: Hôpital Civic) is a neighbourhood in Kitchissippi Ward in central Ottawa, Canada. It is named after the Ottawa Civic Hospital, which is located in the neighbourhood.

Civic Hospital is bounded on the west by Island Park Drive, on the north by the Queensway, on the east by Railway Street and on the south by Carling Avenue. The population as of the Canada 2016 Census was 5,062.

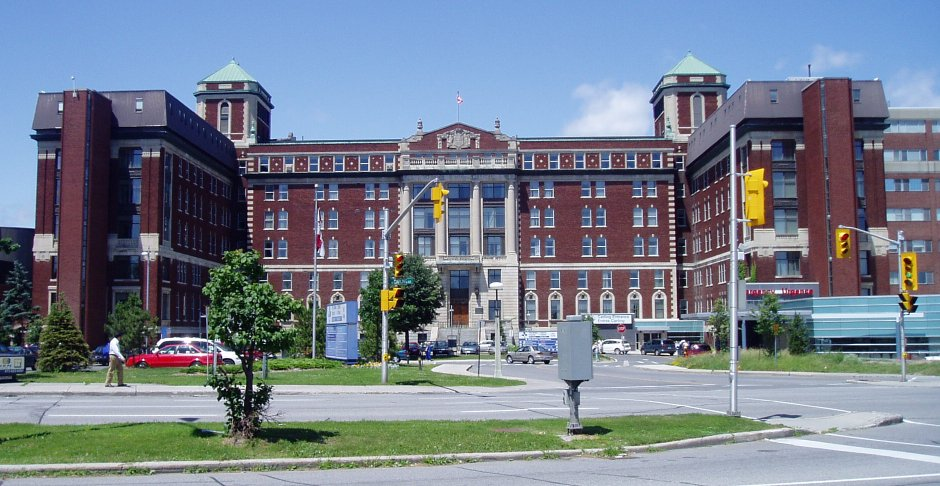
The Civic Hospital neighbourhood is named for the Civic Hospital.

== Community ==
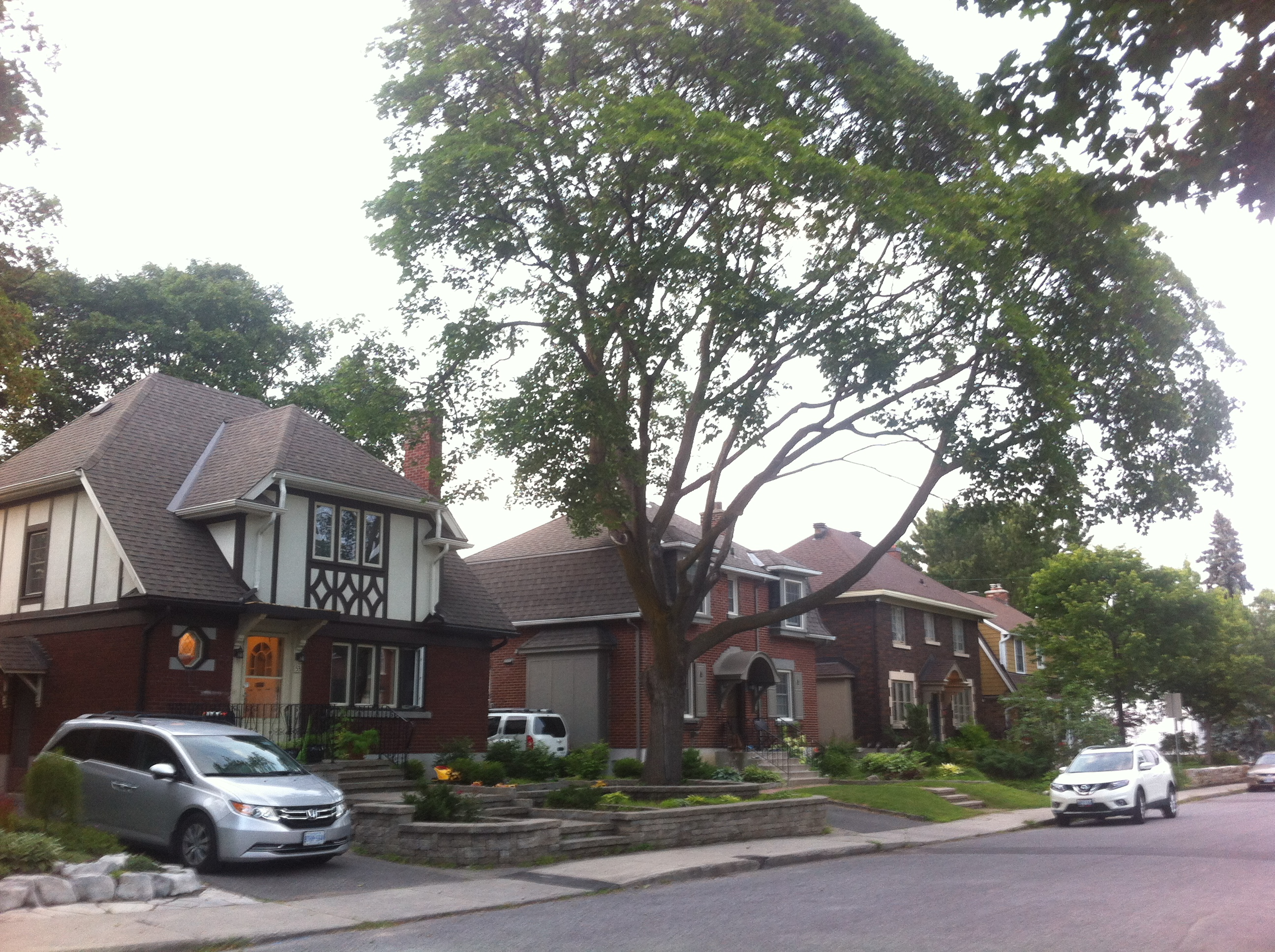
A typical residential street in the Civic Hospital neighbourhood.

Civic Hospital is primarily a residential neighbourhood; the Civic Hospital and a small number of office and commercial buildings line Carling Avenue along the area's southern edge. The 1960 Googie-inspired Civic Pharmacy Building sign at the corner of Carling and Holland Avenues is a local landmark. The community is known for its many high-quality "Younghusband" homes, built by David Younghusband between 1939 and 1947. Residents may belong to the Civic Hospital Neighbourhood Association, which organises events and activities to improve the community.

== History ==
The area first opened to settlement in 1801, and was originally known as Bayswater. It was annexed by Ottawa in 1907. Most of the homes at the time were along Loretta Street and Champagne Avenue, north of Beech Street. It continued to be known as Bayswater after annexation, but the name would fall out of use as the neighbourhood expanded. The Civic Hospital Homeowners Association was established in 1973 and the Civic Hospital Neighbourhood Association was established in 1982.

== Transportation ==
The main streets within the neighbourhood are Parkdale Avenue, Sherwood Drive, Kenilworth Drive and Holland Avenue. The neighbourhood is served by Carling station on O-Train Line 2, frequent bus service on Holland and Parkdale Avenues that connected to O-Train Line 1 at Tunney's Pasture station in 2018, and crosstown routes on Carling Avenue.

== Education ==
Civic Hospital schoolchildren may attend one of five elementary schools, St George (Junior Kindergarten - Grade 6), Elmdale Public School (JK - Grade 6), Fisher Park Public/Summit Alternative School (Grades 7-8), Devonshire Public School (JK - Grade 6) and Connaught Public School (JK - Grade 6), all of which are in adjacent neighbourhoods.
