= Findlay Creek =

Coordinates: 45.3195°N 75.5997°W

- Neighbourhood
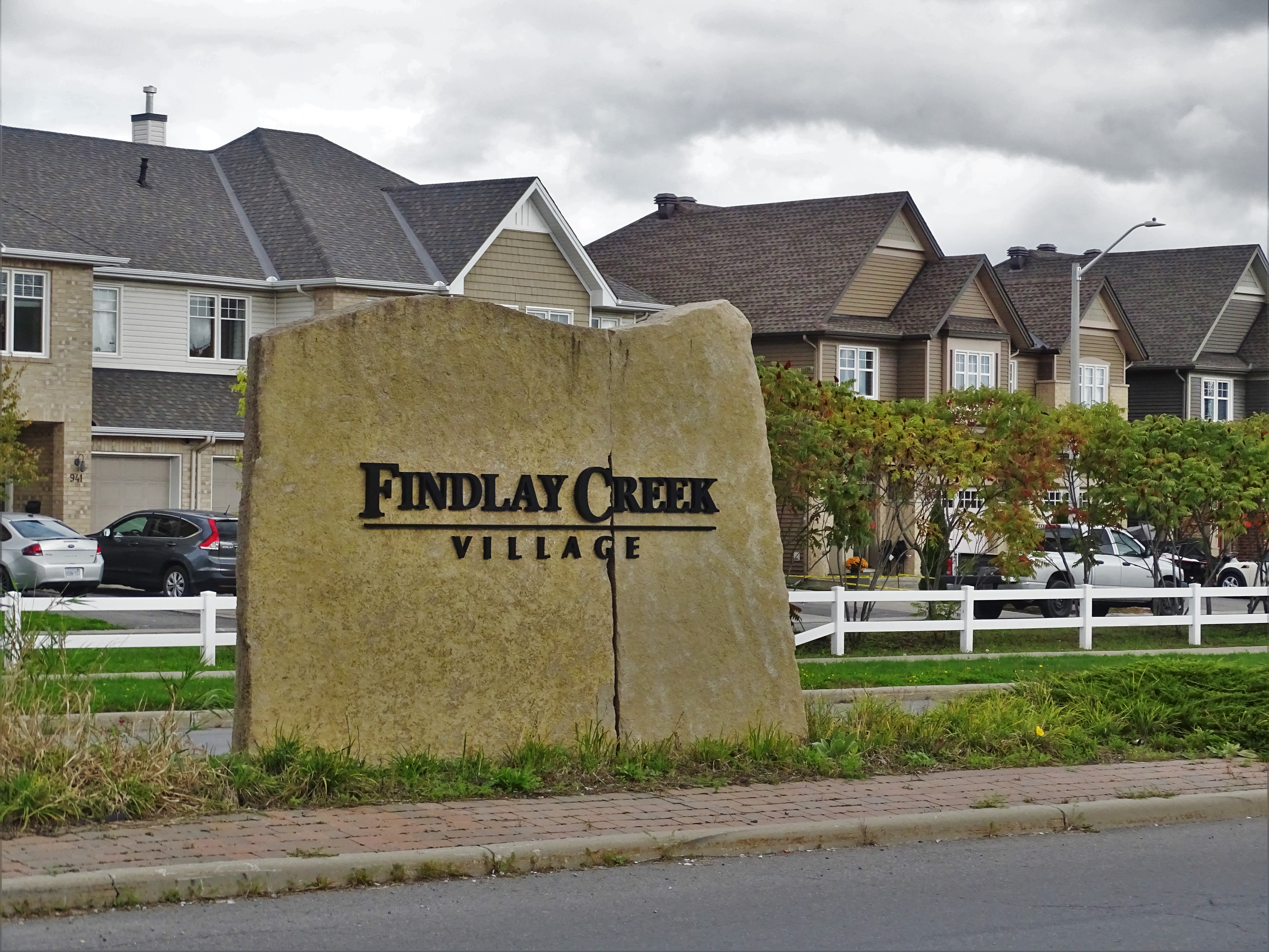
- Interactive map of Findlay Creek
- Country: Canada
- Province: Ontario
- City: Ottawa

Government
  - MP: David McGuinty
  - MPP: George Darouze

Population (2021)
  - Total: 14,089
- Time zone: UTC-5 (EST)
  - Summer (DST): UTC-4 (EDT)

Findlay Creek is a suburban neighbourhood in Riverside South-Findlay Creek Ward in the south end of Ottawa, Ontario, Canada. According to the 2021 Canadian Census, the population of the community was 14,089 and there were 4,395 dwellings.

The Findlay Creek Community Association is the volunteer group representing the interests of the community.

== History ==
In May 1988, the Regional Municipality of Ottawa-Carleton began rezoning this future urban area. Official plans were released in May 1989 with the Leitrim Official Plan Amendment No. 10. This initial plan was met with push-back from groups such as the Ottawa Field Naturalists Club due to the sensitive nature of the wetland system this subdivision would partially destroy, however plans ultimately went forward.

Prior to the establishment of the Findlay Creek community, the area was a primarily undeveloped and used for a mix of residential, industrial, and institutional needs. In November 2003, the Leitrim Community Design Plan (CDP) was initiated to develop the community with a mix of land uses and housing types.

A plan to widen Bank Street along Findlay Creek was announced in 2020, began in 2022.

== Geography ==
Findlay Creek is located just south-west of the intersection of Leitrim Road and Bank Street, and stretches west to Albion Road. The eponymous Findlay Creek springs in the Leitrim Wetlands, directly south of the neighbourhood, and is a tributary of the North Castor River.

== Transport ==
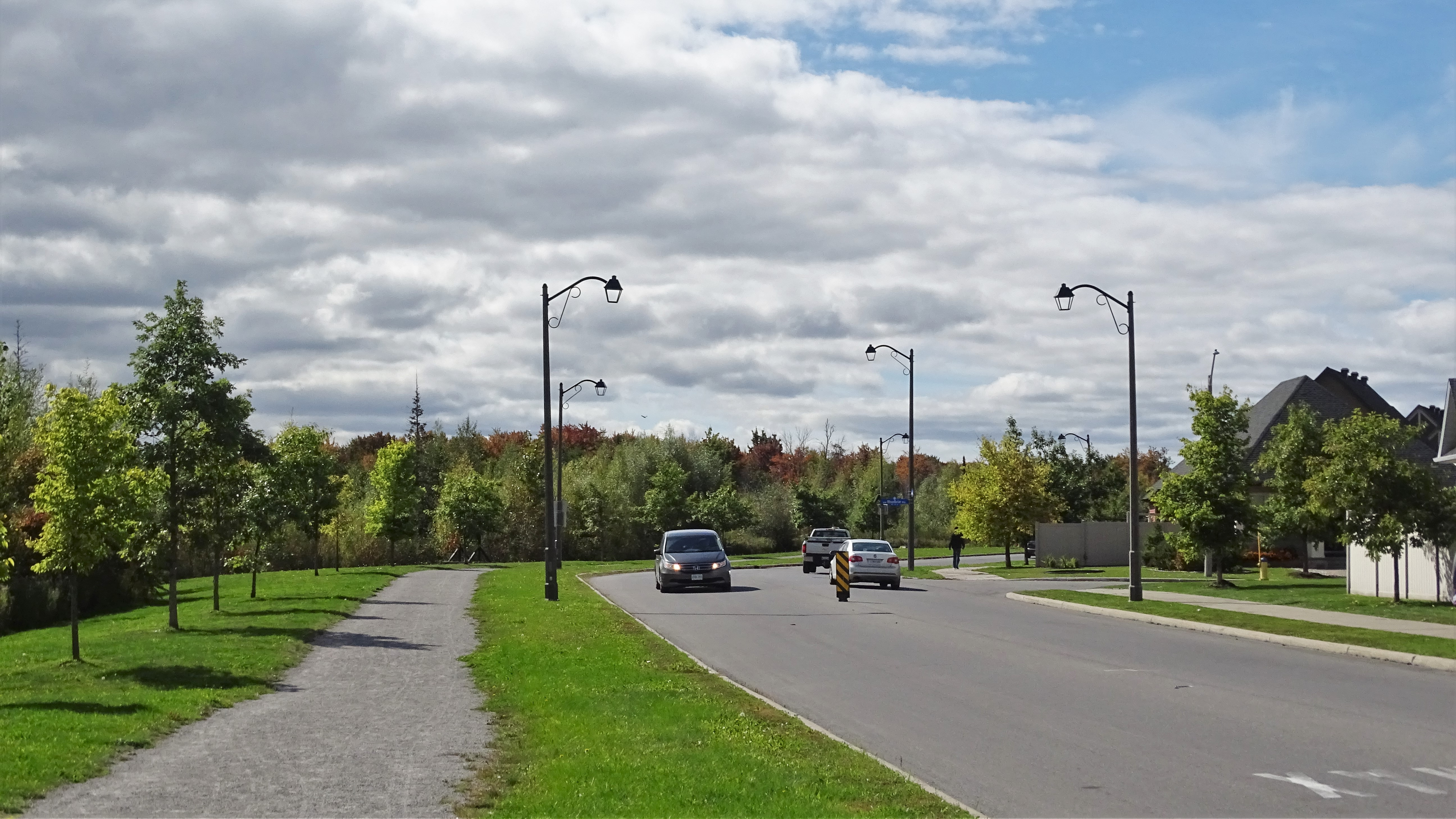
The south end of Findlay Creek backs directly onto the Leitrim Wetlands

As of winter 2025, Two regular OC Transpo bus routes serve Findlay Creek: the local route 93, local limited service route 94 as well as O-Train Line 2 at Leitrim station. In addition, the school route 699 serving École secondaire publique Pierre-De-Blois in Barrhaven passes through the neighbourhood.

== Schools ==
- Vimy Ridge Public School (opened in September 2017) is a public elementary school for Junior Kindergarten (JK) to Grade 6. It's located at the intersection of Kelly Farm Drive and Findlay Creek Drive.
- St. Veronica Catholic School (opened in September 2024) is a catholic elementary school for Junior Kindergarten (JK) to Grade 6. It's located at the intersection of Bradwell Way and Kelly Farm Drive.
