= Hopewell Avenue Public School =

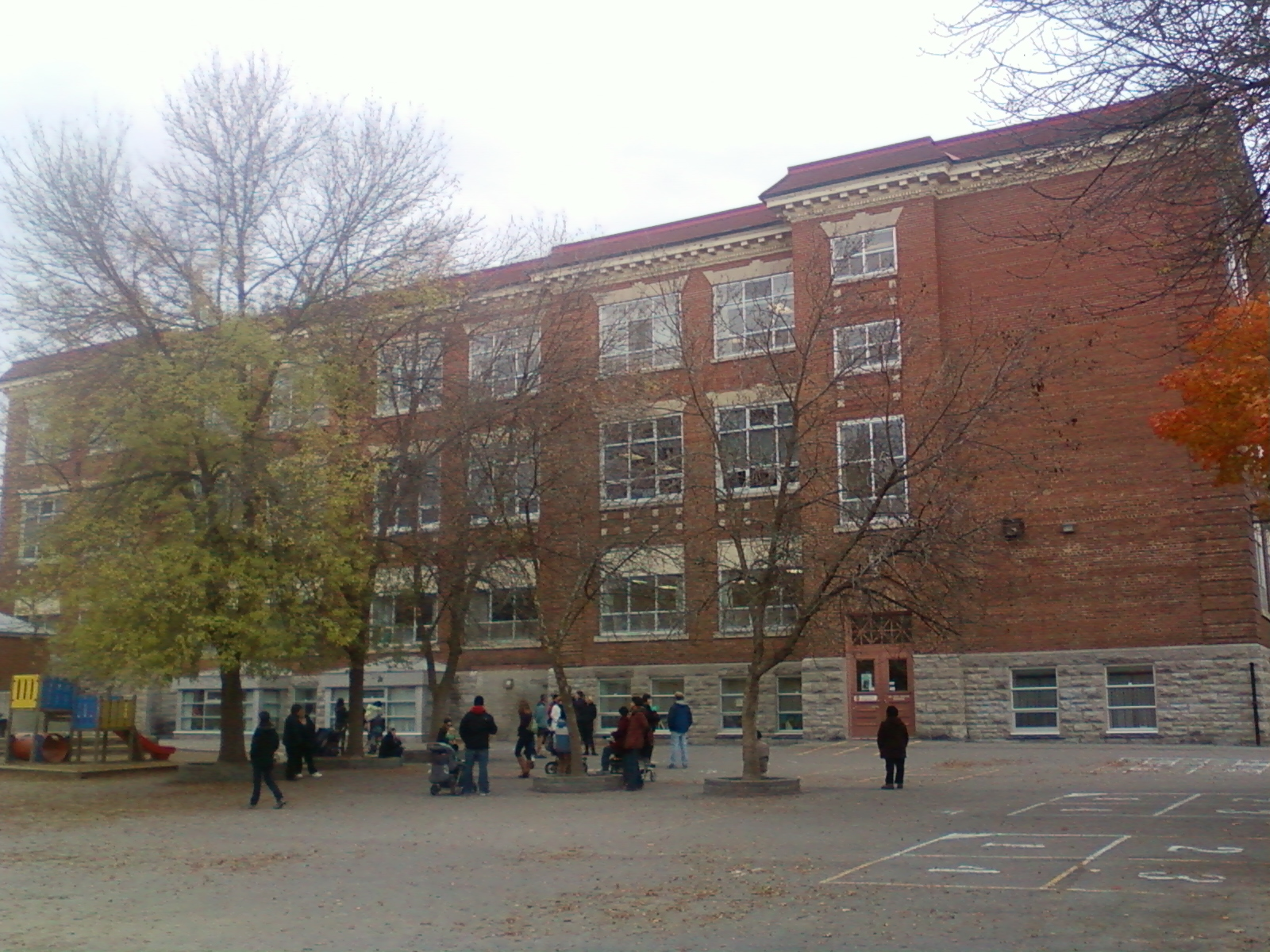
- Hopewell Avenue Public School, West side (before 2015 courtyard renovation)

Location
- 17 Hopewell Avenue; Ottawa, Ontario; Canada; 45°23′37.5″N 75°41′00.0″W

Information
- Motto: 100 Years of Learning
- Founded: 1910
- School board: Ottawa Carleton District School Board
- Principal: Andrea White
- Grades: JK-8
- Enrollment: 950
- Language: English, French.
- Campus: Urban
- Colours: Purple and gold
- Mascot: Pegasus (flying horse)
- Communities served: Old Ottawa South

Hopewell Avenue Public School is a public primary school in Ottawa, Ontario, Canada. It teaches grades JK-8.
