= Glebe Collegiate Institute =

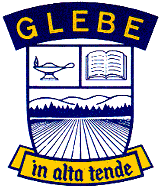

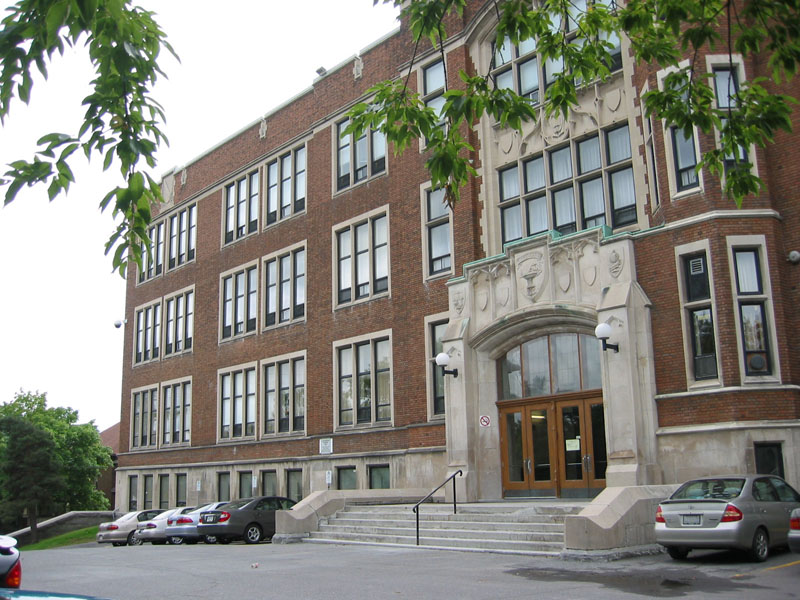

Location
- 212 Glebe Avenue; Ottawa, Ontario, K1S 2C9; Canada; 45.40169°N 75.69687°W

Information
- Motto: In Alta Tende (Strive for the Heights)
- Founded: 1923
- School board: Ottawa Carleton District School Board
- Superintendent: Prince Duah
- Area trustee: Rob Campbell
- Administrator: Wendy Gagnon
- Principal: Christine Reynolds
- Grades: 9-12
- Enrollment: 1,452 (2019)
- Language: English, French, Spanish
- Area: The Glebe
- Campus type: Urban
- Colours: Blue and gold
- Mascot: The Gryphon
- Team name: Gryphons
- Public transit access: OC Transpo
- Website: glebe.ocdsb.ca

Glebe Collegiate Institute (GCI) is a high school in the Glebe neighbourhood of Ottawa, Ontario, Canada. Administered by the Ottawa-Carleton District School Board (OCDSB), Glebe Collegiate Institute has approximately 1,700 students and is the district's largest school. The school offers specialized programs, such as French immersion, English as a second language, bilingual, gifted, and a learning disability and special education learning centre.

== History ==
The school was founded not as an independent entity but as an expansion of the Ottawa Collegiate Institute. In 1919, the Adolescent School Attendance Act made attending school compulsory until age 16. This led to a dramatic rise in secondary school enrolment. The OCI had outgrown its existing facility (now Lisgar Collegiate Institute). A new facility, "Ottawa Collegiate Institute, Glebe Building", was built on what was then the outskirts of the city. Construction of this was a slow process; classes began in 1922 before it was complete, causing some inconveniences. The building was officially opened in 1923. Symbols of the OCI continue to adorn the entrance to the school.

The rivalry between Glebe and Lisgar Collegiate Institute commenced soon after the division of the OCI. In one incident, a banquet was held at the Glebe building that included student clubs from both schools. In the middle of the meal, a food fight erupted between the two groups and only an enraged principal could persuade students to stop.

On October 19, 2017, Glebe Collegiate Institute went into lockdown after a gun and a bullet were found on school grounds. A young man was arrested, but there were no injuries.

== Facility ==
Constructed in the early 20th century, the school has an old-fashioned architectural style that has been kept consistent despite additions to the building. The school has recently gone through extensive renovations in its science department to make the labs the most modern in the school district. Notable features of the building include an auditorium with balcony seating, a subbasement dedicated wholly to an orchestral music room, instrument storage, and the music teachers' office, and a small greenhouse on the roof, which few students have been to. The school once included an underground swimming pool, but it has been closed. The school is a Wi-Fi hotspot, and all students and teachers have access to the internet via wireless devices and computers. However, apart from the computer labs, Glebe lacks air conditioning.

Glebe has a full-size playing field that is used for a variety of high school sports like soccer, football, and baseball. Around the field, there are track and field running facilities with two full supporter stands.

== Extracurricular activities ==
=== Arts ===
In 1974, Glebe Collegiate Institute concert and stage bands produced an album, Something gold... Something blue. A second album, Glebe Stage Band, was released in 1978.

Glebe has a percussion group, Offbeat, which uses common objects like trash cans, brooms, chalk dusters, and water barrels as instruments. Glebe was mentioned in an issue of Maclean's magazine (August 23, 2004) which identified Canada's best schools for a school with "cool extracurriculars". They also have a student-led band, Ventana.

The school's improv comedy teams have twice placed within the Canadian Improv Games national finals.

=== Sports ===
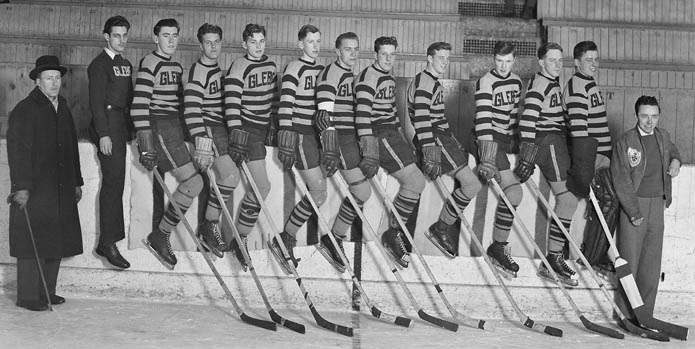
Glebe Collegiate hockey team, 1938, including later member of Hockey Hall of Fame, Syd Howe

Students and sports teams are referred to as Gryphons.

From 2012 through 2017, the Glebe Girls' Cross Country Team won five consecutive overall OFSAA XC titles.

Students at Glebe Collegiate Institute during the 2010–20 decade would sometimes help set up and take down a temporary dome at a nearby exhibition centre during the winter. In exchange, the company that owned the dome would let school sports teams at Glebe use the dome for athletic practices. In later years, the company offered to build a turf field and another temporary dome on Glebe property for free, but the school board refused to give approval.

=== Other ===
In the 2012–13 school year, $9,000 was raised for cancer research, more than $17,000 for the Children's Hospital of Eastern Ontario (CHEO) as well as the largest food donation ever to the Centre Town Emergency Food bank.

Glebe's robotics program participated in US FIRST international robotics competition and won the SKILLS Canada STEM and Controls competition in 2015.

Glebe's Reach for the Top trivia team has won the national championships two consecutive years (2020–21 and 2021–22 school years. The competitions were held online due to COVID-19.

Glebe also has numerous other clubs, such as the Chess Club, and the Creative Writing club.

== In media ==
Glebe Collegiate Institute was used in the filming of the 2008 Canadian-American drama film The Perfect Assistant.

In 2008 and 2010, a group of four Glebe science teachers (Andrew Cumberland, Dan Lajoie, Colin Harris, and Masato Kachi) placed second in Canada in the Discovery Channel's Iron Science Competition.

== Notable alumni and students ==
- Donald Brittain (filmmaker)
- Edwin Orion Brownell (composer, entertainer)
- Jock Climie (football player, sportscaster)
- Samantha Cogan (ice hockey player for PWHL Toronto)
- Bill Cowley (hockey player)
- Brian Doyle (author)
- Harvey Glatt (music manager, broadcaster)
- Luba Goy (actress, comedian)
- Elizabeth Hanna (voice actress, speech-language pathologist)
- Angela Hewitt (pianist)
- Syd Howe (hockey player)
- Clark Johnson (actor, director, producer)
- John Manley (politician)
- Peter Mansbridge (news anchor)
- Steve Marriner (musician)
- Dewey Martin (drummer)
- David McGuinty (politician)
- Sean Michaels (writer)
- Alanis Morissette (singer)
- Hannah Moscovitch (playwright)
- Michael J. Reynolds (actor, writer)
- Rick Sowieta (football player)
- Patrick Watson (author, television producer)
- Mike Gormley (career manager, record executive, podcaster)
- Waneek Horn-Miller (water polo athlete)

== See also ==
- Education in Ontario
- List of secondary schools in Ontario
