= David Younghusband =

Canadian architect

- Born: 1883
- Died: 1965 (aged 81–82)
- Occupation: Architect

David Younghusband (1883–1965) was a residential architect and building contractor in Ottawa, Ontario, Canada. His houses, typically brick construction in the Arts and Crafts style and featuring a centre hall plan, form a prominent part of the residential architectural fabric in a number of Ottawa neighbourhoods dating from the first half of the 20th century, in particular the Glebe neighbourhood.
