= The Glebe =

The Glebe Le Glèbe (French)
- Neighbourhood
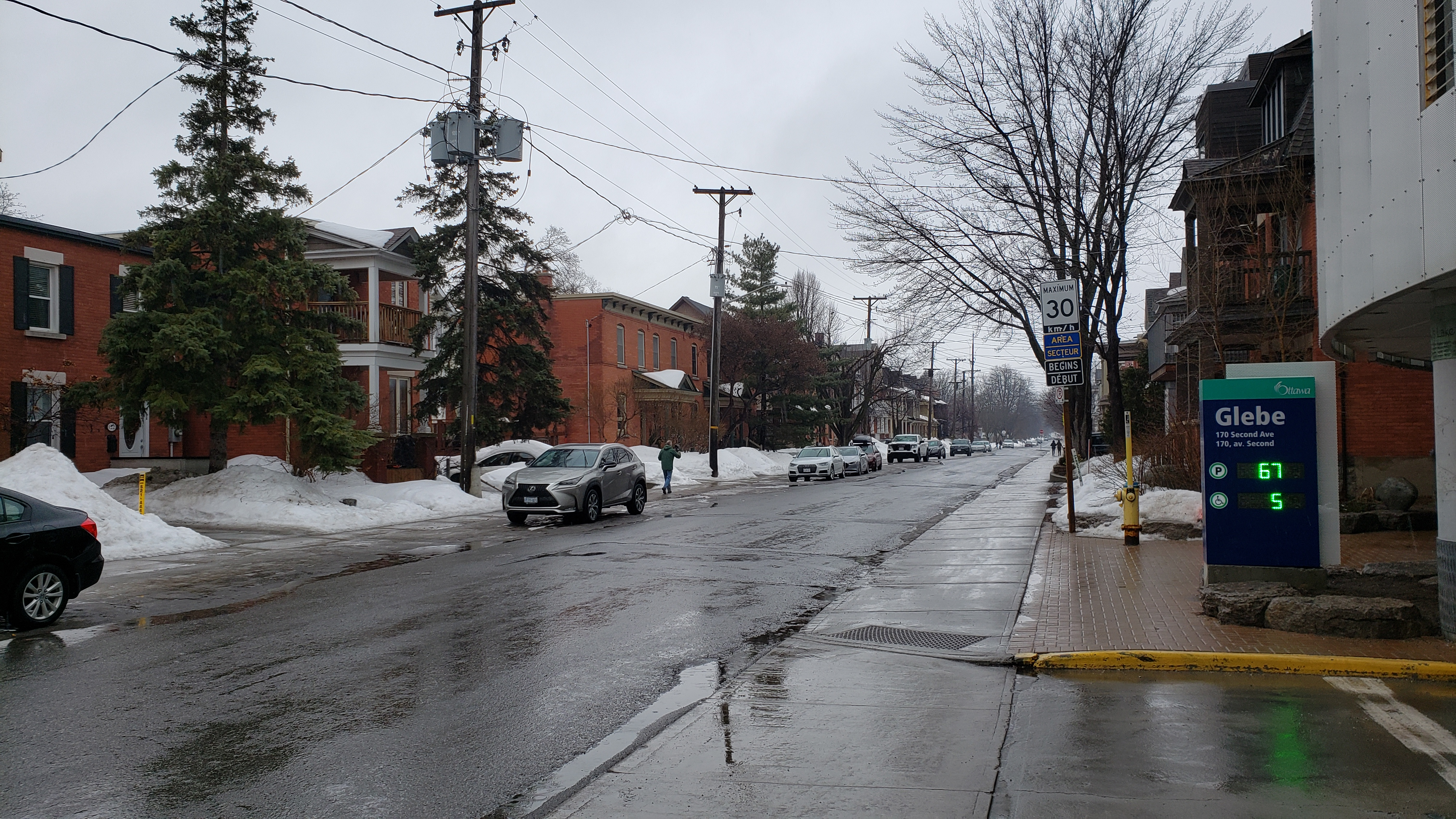
- A residential avenue near Bank Street in the Glebe

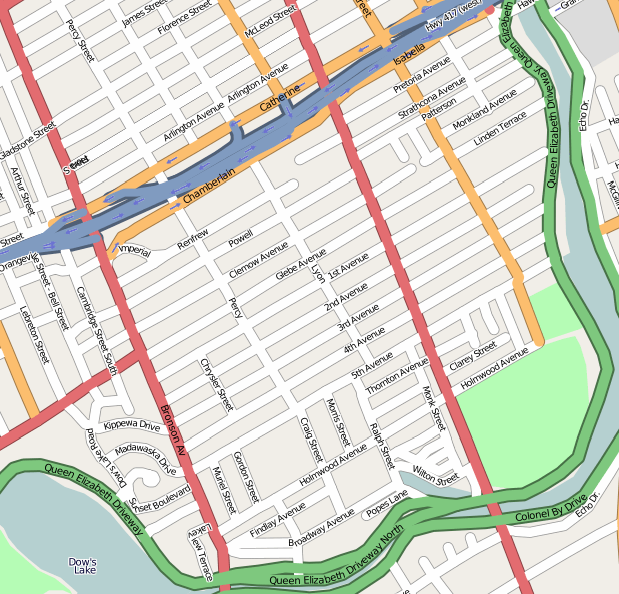
- Map of The Glebe, with highway 417 being the northern border
- Coordinates: 45.40022°N 75.69219°W
- Country: Canada
- Province: Ontario
- City: Ottawa
- Annexation: 1889 (City of Ottawa)

Government
  - MPs: Yasir Naqvi
  - MPPs: Catherine McKenney
  - Councillors: Shawn Menard
  - Governing body: Glebe Community Association
  - Board President: Laura Smith

Area
  - Total: 2.704 km^{2} (1.044 sq mi)
- Elevation: 70 m (230 ft)

Population (2016)
  - Total: 13,055
  - Density: 4,828/km^{2} (12,500/sq mi)
- Canada 2016 Census
- Forward sortation area: K1S

The Glebe is a neighbourhood in Ottawa, Ontario, Canada. It is located just south of Downtown Ottawa in the Capital Ward. As of 2016, the neighbourhood had a population of 13,055.

The Glebe is bounded on the north by the Queensway, on the east and south by the Rideau Canal and on the west by LeBreton Street South, Carling Avenue and Dow's Lake. This area includes the Glebe Annex, an area west of Bronson Avenue, north of Carling Avenue, east of LeBreton South Street and south of the Queensway. It also includes the Dow's Lake neighbourhood, an area north of the Rideau Canal, east of Dow's Lake, south of Carling Avenue, and west of Bronson.

The Glebe lies in the federal riding of Ottawa Centre and the provincial electoral district of the same name.

== Community ==
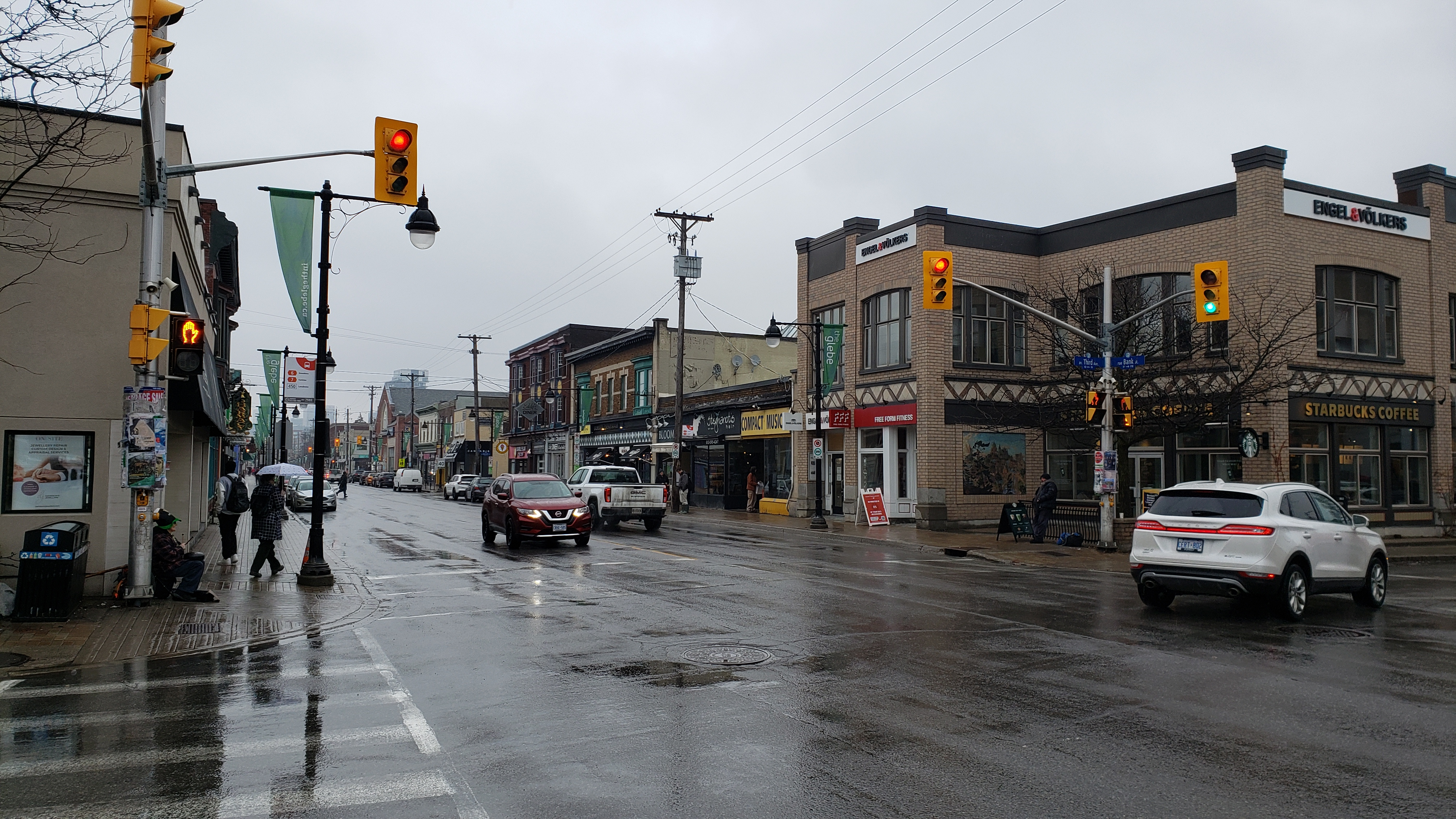
The intersection of Bank Street and Third Avenue in the Glebe

The Glebe has a strong community association which, in addition to operating the Glebe Community Centre, lobbies the local government on issues such as traffic calming and neighbourhood development. The Glebe has a community newspaper, Glebe Report, that has been published independently since 1973.

The Glebe is mostly populated by families; the area has many children, and consequently, its social services are oriented towards youth.

The stretch of Bank Street that runs through the Glebe has many small stores and restaurants offering a variety of services. Much of the rest of the Glebe consists of detached homes, many of them constructed in the early decades of the 20th century. Some of these homes are owner-occupied family residences, while others have been subdivided into multiple rental apartments.

The Glebe is home to Lansdowne Park which contains TD Place Stadium, where Ottawa's Canadian Football League (CFL) football team (the Ottawa Redblacks) and the University of Ottawa Gee-Gees play their home games. Lansdowne Park also contains TD Place Arena, which is the permanent home of the Ottawa 67's and was the temporary home (1992–1995) for the Ottawa Senators before the Canadian Tire Centre (originally called The Palladium) was completed. The area that became the park was purchased from local farmers in 1868 by the City of Ottawa Agricultural Society.

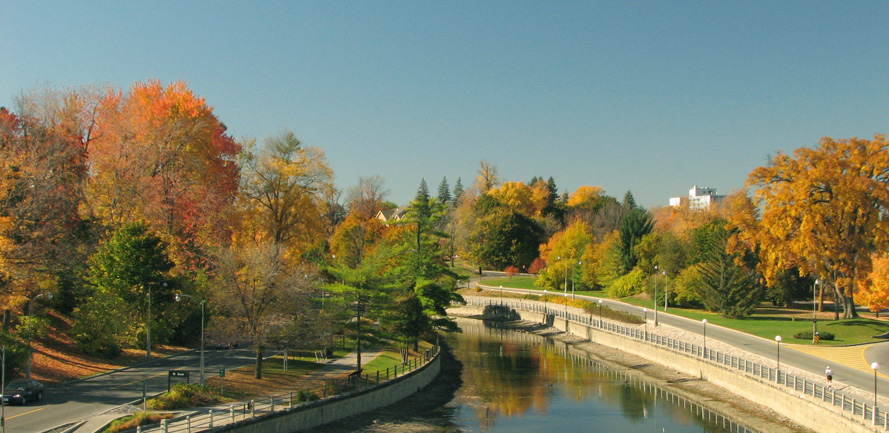
The Rideau Canal passes through the Glebe

From the Rideau Canal, two bodies of water jut into the Glebe: Patterson Creek and Brown's Inlet. These areas are surrounded by parks and some of the city's most expensive homes.

The fourth Saturday in May of each year brings the "Great Glebe Garage Sale" to the neighbourhood, during which every participating household puts items out for sale in hopes of attracting a large contingent of bargain hunters to the area. Sellers are expected to donate a portion of the proceeds to a designated charity.

May is also the time of the Canadian Tulip Festival. The largest tulip beds in the National Capital Region are found in Commissioner's Park in the Dow's Lake neighbourhood, next to Dow's Lake.

== History ==
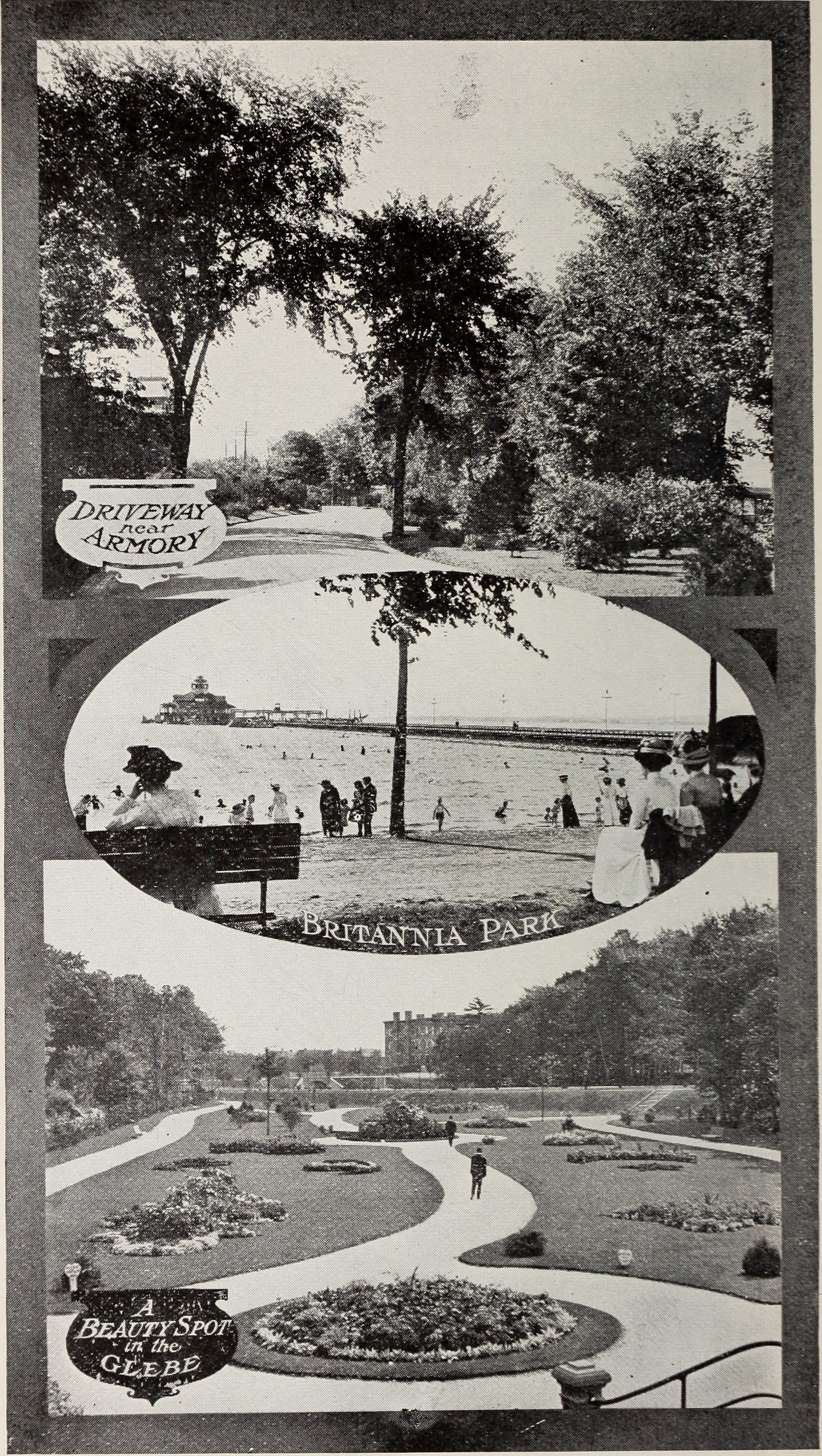
A park in the Glebe (bottom) in 1912

The area is called the Glebe because in the initial 1837 survey of Ottawa, the area of 178 acres was deeded by the Crown to St. Andrew's Presbyterian Church as Clergy Reserve. The word "glebe" means church lands, and the area was originally known as "the glebe lands of St. Andrew's Presbyterian Church". When the area was opened for development in 1870, real estate agents began to refer to it simply as "The Glebe". The initial area was bounded by Carling Avenue and Fifth Avenue on the north and south sides, and Main Street and Bronson Avenue as the eastern and western limits. The original city limits on the south side had been set at Gladstone Avenue when the city was incorporated. Annexation in 1889 extended the new limits to the Rideau Canal. By the Act of the Provincial Legislature, the Glebe became part of a small but growing city. By the late 1960s, the Glebe was bounded by the Queensway on the north side, by the Rideau Canal on the east and south, and with Bronson Avenue as a western boundary.

The Glebe was one of Ottawa's first suburbs. In 1871 James Whyte, one of the leading merchants of the town, built a large residence on Canal Road on the north side of the waterway at midpoint between what is now Bank Street and Bronson Avenue, which served the Basilian Fathers in the 1960s. In 1872, James Whyte moved into a new home on Bank Street near Holmwood Avenue, which served the community in the 1960s as a residence for older people. In 1882 the creation of Central Park and the construction of the new Canada Atlantic Railway terminal on the west side of the Rideau Canal at the end of the Glebe encouraged the development of the southern section of the city.

In June 1891, the first electric street car set off down Bank Street for the Exhibition, which opened at Lansdowne Park in 1888. First Avenue Public School and St. Matthew's Anglican Church, then a small frame structure, opened their doors about the same time in 1898. Mutchmor Public School on Fifth Avenue was built in the 1890s with additions in 1911 and 1920 as housing density increased and new families moved into the district. The separate school, Corpus Christi, also dates from this early era. Roman Catholic families attended Mass for some years to a temporary chapel on the south side of Fourth Avenue near Percy. In 1900, the Ottawa Electric Street Railway was established, with one of its first routes running south along Bank Street. The Drive way, from Elgin Street and Laurier Avenue over the route to the Experimental Farm, was built between 1900 and 1903, providing added impetus to city growth on the south side. Most Glebe houses (which were largely built before 1914) date from this era, and the area became home to many middle-class workers. As housing went up on the avenues, corner stores and other commercial properties began to appear on Bank Street. The electric street car allowed workers to live in the Glebe and take the street car to work. As part of this building program, Clemow and Monkland Avenues were laid out and Clemow Avenue was paved west from Bank Street. From 1903 to 1904, a large low-lying area between Second and Third Avenues was filled in with sand taken from the land along Carling Avenue. Growth was slower on the blocks west of Bank Street, and housing did not extend much beyond Kent Street.

A series of distinctive homes, both east and west of Bank Street, were indicative of the style and wealth of the owners. A number of the more upscale residences were designed by renowned Canadian architects W.E. Noffke and David Younghusband, while others were pattern-book homes built by local builders based on catalog designs similar to foursquare architecture elsewhere in North America.

Blessed Sacrament Parish was formed in 1913; however, the church was constructed 19 years later. The Methodist Congregation worshiped originally in Moreland's Hall, on Bank Street, however Glebe Methodist Church was organized in 1913. At the time of church union in the 1920s, Glebe Methodist Church became St James United Church on Second Avenue, now known as Glebe-St. James United Church.

Glebe Collegiate Institute opened in 1922 (originally as a branch of the Ottawa Collegiate Institute, now Lisgar Collegiate), under Principal McDougall. The adjoining High School of Commerce opened in 1929. Ottawa Ladies' College, a private school specialising in the education of young women, operated on First Avenue from 1914 to 1942. During the Second World War years, the Ladies College facilities were used by the Canadian Military. Later as Carleton College, the premises played a vital part in the establishment of Carleton University. The Ava Theatre, a spacious cinema opened in 1928 at the corner of Bank Street and Second Avenue.

After 1945, postwar housing filled in the remaining acres, particularly on those streets just off Bronson Avenue where house construction had declined in the years after 1930. Side yards and vacant lots disappeared in the final stages of development.

Elsewhere in the Glebe, house construction at the time was unplanned and erratic, with housing standards lower and development haphazard. After World War II, however, these areas were largely removed or rehabilitated so that by the late 1960s, generally speaking, the Glebe possessed housing stock suitable for both upper and middle income groups. The Ottawa Improvement Commission, the forerunner of the National Capital Commission, beautified the area with special attention to sidewalks, trees and shrubs, and street lights.

In the middle part of the century the Glebe changed as the middle class moved to more distant suburbs such as Alta Vista and Nepean, and the Glebe became transformed into a predominantly working-class neighbourhood with the houses subdivided into multiple apartments or turned into rooming houses.

The neighbourhood began to change again in the 1970s when it underwent significant gentrification and became one of Ottawa's elite neighbourhoods. These changes are obvious in the census. From 1971 to 1996 the percentage of the population with university degrees rose from 10 to 60 percent. White collar employment grew from less than half to some 95%. While in 1971 Glebe residents were 14 percent poorer than the average citizen of Ottawa, in 1996 they were 18 percent wealthier.

The 5 metre wide and 123 metre long CAD 21 million Flora Footbridge, which connects the Glebe to Old Ottawa East, opened to pedestrians and cyclists in 2019.

== Community associations ==
The Glebe has its own neighbourhood association, the Glebe Community Association.

The Glebe Annex maintains its own neighbourhood association, the Glebe Annex Community Association (GACA). Dow's lake also maintains its own neighbourhood association, the Dow's Lake Residents Association (DLRA).

== Notable residents past and present ==
- George Walker Wesley Dawson, politician (until his death)
- Catherine McKenna, politician
- James Strutt, architect
- Charlotte Whitton, mayor of Ottawa
- Eugene Forsey, senator and constitutional expert
- Flora MacDonald, politician and humanitarian
- Hannah Moscovitch, playwright
- Mitchell Sharp, politician
- Craig Oliver, journalist
- Abby Hoffman, athlete, activist

== Churches and temples ==
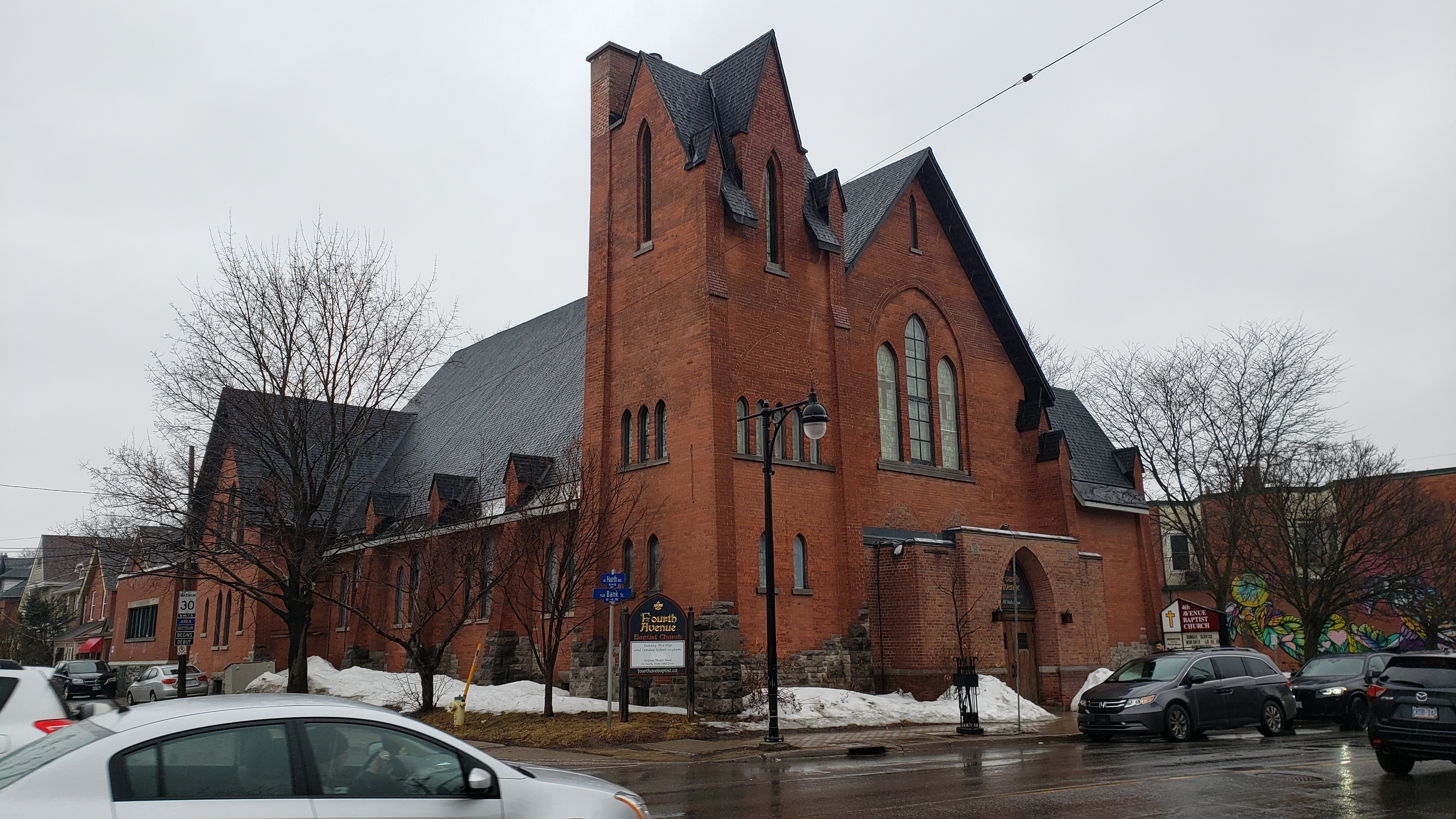
Fourth Avenue Baptist Church in 2023

- Blessed Sacrament Catholic Church
- Glebe-St. James United Church
- St. Giles Presbyterian Church
- St. Matthew's Anglican Church
- Fourth Avenue Baptist Church
- Vishva Shakti Durga Mandir Hindu Temple
- Ottawa Chinese United Church

== Schools ==
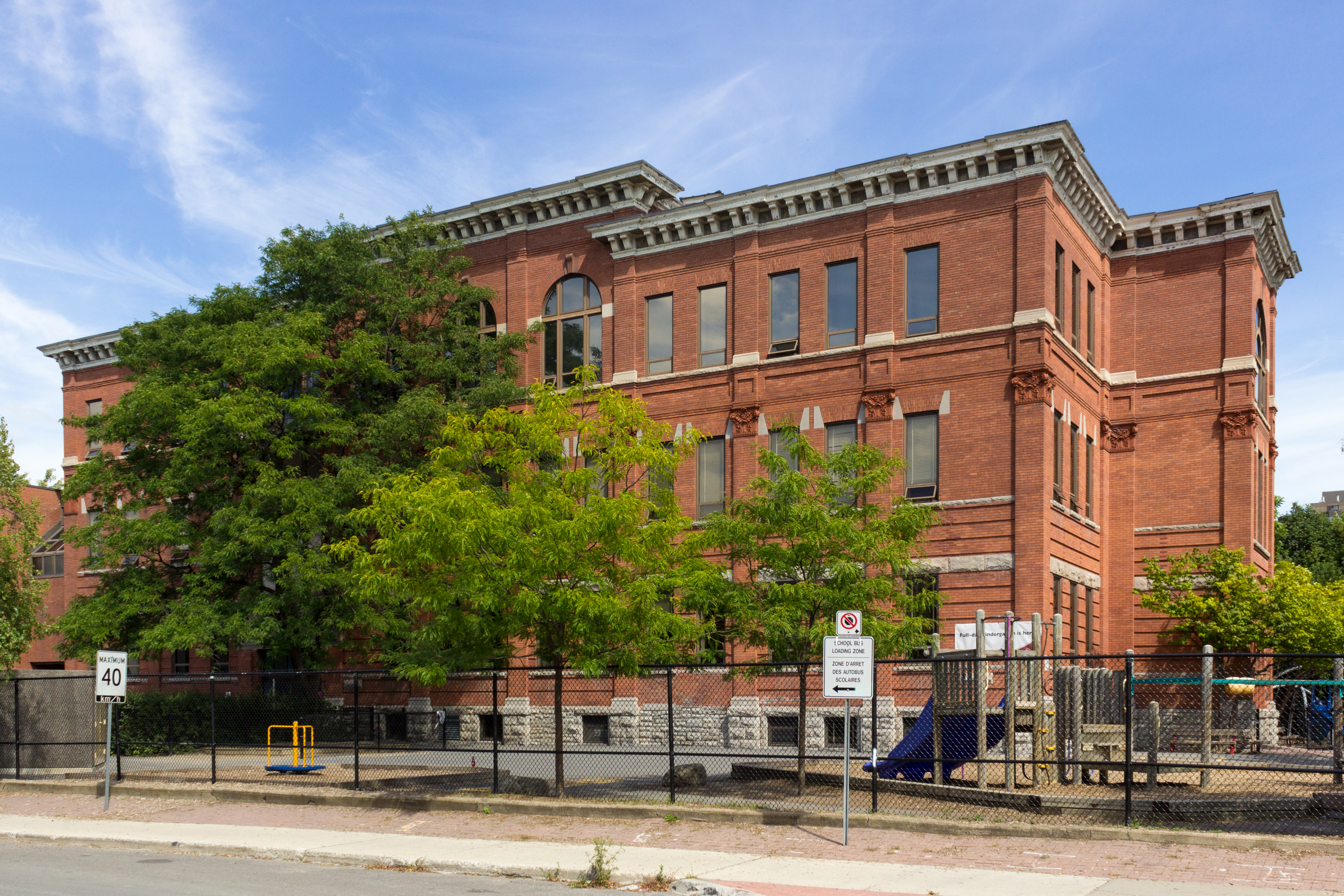
First Avenue Public School in 2014

Elementary schools:

- First Avenue Public School
- Corpus Christi School
- Mutchmor Public School

Secondary schools:

- Glebe Collegiate Institute
- The Element High School

== Embassies and High Commissions ==
- The Official Residence of the Ambassador of Greece
- The High Commission of Ghana
- The Embassy of Tunisia
- The Official Residence of the Ambassador of Vietnam
- The Consulate General of Latvia
- The Embassy of Lebanon
- The High Commission of Cameroon
- The High Commission for the Republic of Trinidad and Tobago

== Monuments and Memorials ==
- Thomas Ahearn Memorial
- Statue of Frank Clair
- Share the Flame Monument
- Moving Surfaces Sculpture
- Moose Sculpture
- Air India Victims Memorial
- The Man with Two Hats Statue
- Flora MacDonald's Footbridge

== Parks and Recreation ==
- Glebe Memorial Park
- Chamberlain Park
- Central Park West
- Central Park East
- Patterson Creek Park
- Lionel Britton Park
- Silvia Holden Park
- Lansdowne Park
- Brown's Inlet Park
- Capital Park
- Eugene Forsey Park
- Commissioners Park
- Glebe Community Centre
- St.James Tennis Club

== See also ==
- List of Ottawa neighbourhoods
