= Leitrim Wetlands =

Bog in Ottawa, Canada

Coordinates: 45°18′30″N 75°36′30″W

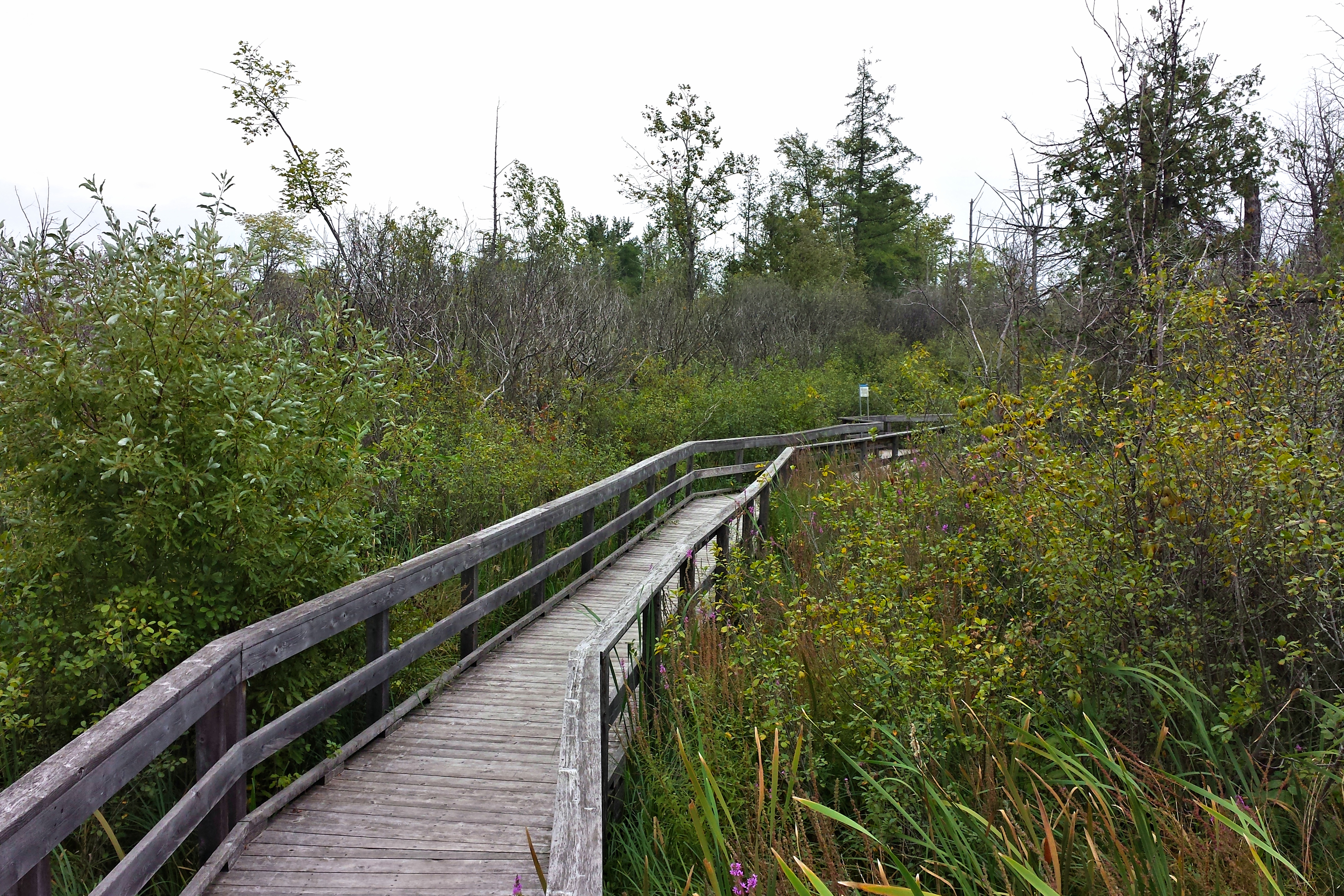
The Findlay Creek boardwalk at Leitrim wetlands

The Leitrim Wetlands (also known as Albion Road Wetlands) is a large provincially significant wetland just south of Findlay Creek, a suburban neighbourhood in the city of Ottawa, Ontario, Canada. Efforts to protect it from development have been a longstanding issue for environmental organizations in the city.

The wetland consists of several different habitats, including marshland, cedar swamps and calcareous fen.
