= Old Ottawa South =

Ottawa South
- Neighbourhood
- Location in Ottawa
- Coordinates: 45°23′30″N 75°41′00″W
- Country: Canada
- Province: Ontario
- City: Ottawa
- Established: 1814
- Incorporated: 1905 (Police Village of Rideauville)
- Annexation: 1907 (City of Ottawa)

Government
  - Mayor: Mark Sutcliffe
  - MPs: Yasir Naqvi
  - MPPs: Catherine McKenney
  - Councillors: Shawn Menard
- Elevation: 65 m (213 ft)

Population (2011)
  - Total: 6,348
- Canada 2016 Census
- Time zone: UTC−5 (Eastern (EST))
  - Summer (DST): UTC−4 (EDT)

Old Ottawa South is an older urban neighbourhood in Capital Ward in Ottawa, Ontario, Canada. Old Ottawa South is a relatively small and compact neighbourhood, located between the Rideau Canal (to the north) and the Rideau River (to the south). The eastern boundary is Avenue Road. Bronson Avenue forms the western border of the residential neighbourhood. Carleton University is on the other (western) side of Bronson but the campus can be considered to be geographically within Old Ottawa South as the campus is also nestled between the river and the canal.

According to the Canada 2016 Census, the population of the neighbourhood was 6,348

Today, Old Ottawa South is an upper-middle-class area. Proximity to the university has meant that the neighbourhood has been a haven for professors and students, although rising housing prices are driving out the latter. It is also one of Ottawa's more politically progressive neighbourhoods and has been a stronghold for the New Democratic Party. As of 2026, the incumbent MP is Liberal, while the MPP is New Democrat.

Many neighbourhood businesses line Bank Street, including several pubs, the Mayfair Theatre, and some Lebanese stores towards the Southern end. This section of Bank Street is also well known for its antique stores. As part of a 2004 Bank Street redesign, inlaid metal maple leaves were added to the sidewalks inscribed with the names of Canadian folk musicians. Other new features included the removal of overhead powerlines, "traffic calming" measures, and the addition of more brick to the sidewalks.

== History ==
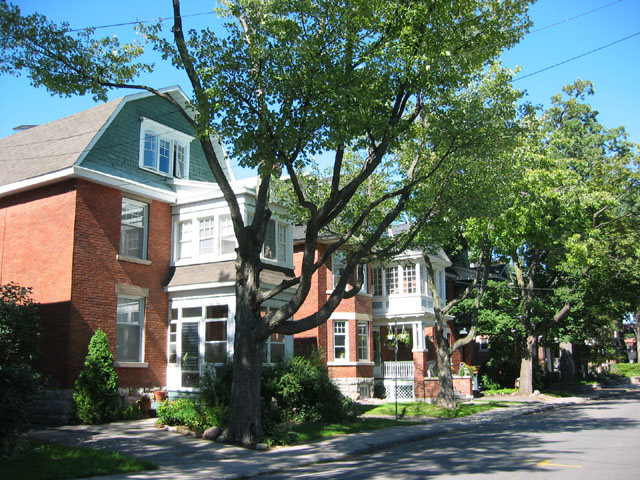
Typical architecture dating from the early 20th century

The area was originally settled around 1814 by American and British settlers. In those years, even after the construction of the canal the area was fairly sparsely populated. The larger community south of the Rideau River around the Billings estate exerted more influence over the fledgling community than the city of Ottawa did in those days.

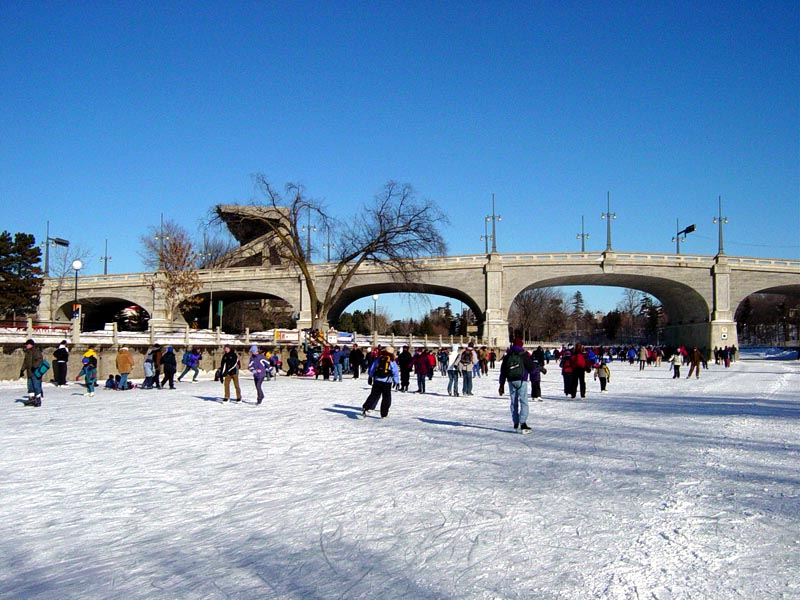
The Bank Street Bridge and canal in winter. The canal marks the northern boundary of Old Ottawa South.

Shortly after Confederation in 1867, a bridge was built over the canal increasing access from the larger city to the north. The area was tentatively called Rideauville at the time. After the turn of the century, the area grew rapidly. Rideauville was incorporated as a police village in 1905 and was annexed to Ottawa in 1907. The streetcar tracks were extended to the area around 1910, again encouraging rapid growth. The old streetcar ran along a route roughly similar to today's bus route #7, turning around in what is now Brewer Park. Hopewell School was built around this time.

The architectural style is mostly "Craftsman", with many houses in the American Foursquare style popular in the 1920s and 1930s. Many of these houses have been upgraded and added to over the years, contributing to the area's eclectic style.

Old Ottawa South retains a significant collection of early-20th-century residential architecture, including Craftsman and American Foursquare houses, reflecting its development as a streetcar suburb in the early 1900s.

The neighbourhood's location between the Rideau Canal and the Rideau River provides access to waterfront pathways, parks and outdoor recreation, while Bank Street serves as a local commercial corridor with independent businesses and cultural venues.

The area's development was shaped by the expansion of electric streetcar service along Bank Street in the early 20th century, which improved connections with central Ottawa and helped stimulate residential subdivision and growth.

Since the 1920s, the streetcars have been replaced by buses, stores have changed, and Carleton University was constructed. Many of the streetscapes and much of the housing has been preserved however.

In the 1920s, the area opened Brighton Beach, a public swimming venue on the shore of the Rideau River. It was opened for residents of the area to conduct water sports and to take swimming lessons. Brighton Beach was officially closed in 1970 due to adherence to new City of Ottawa pollution standards.

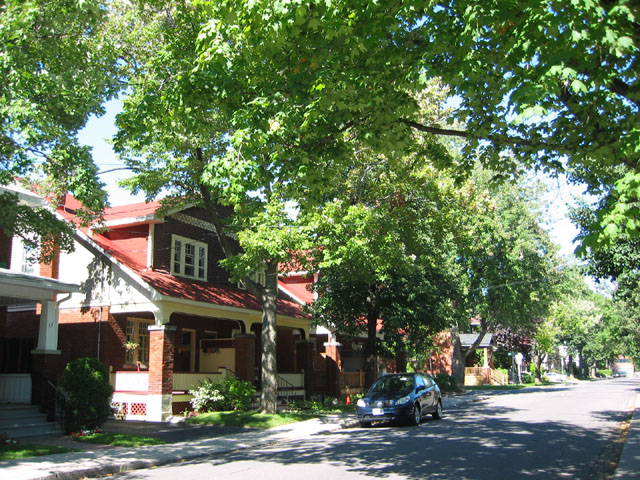
Most streets are tree-lined

Notable buildings include Hopewell Avenue Public School, Southminster Church, St. Margaret Mary Church, Trinity Church, the Mayfair Theatre, the former Precious Blood Convent (now the Royal College of Physicians and Surgeons of Canada), and the Old Firehall (currently a community centre).

Around 300 residences and institutional buildings are included on Ottawa's heritage reference list (an inventory of sites & structures potentially considered for legal protection as cultural heritage resources) from the area.

Old Ottawa South's built environment reflects its development as a streetcar suburb in the early 20th century, when bridge construction and the extension of electric streetcar service along Bank Street encouraged residential growth. Its residential streets contain examples of early-20th-century architectural styles, mature trees and historically significant streetscapes, while Bank Street retains traditional commercial buildings and neighbourhood businesses. The Mayfair Theatre, which opened in 1932, is a notable example of Spanish Revival atmospheric cinema architecture and was designated under the Ontario Heritage Act in 2008; its proposed sale and the questions surrounding its continued use have also received CBC News coverage. The neighbourhood's location between the Rideau Canal and Rideau River connects its residential streets to waterfront pathways and recreational spaces, while Bank Street provides access to independent shops, cafés and cultural venues. Together, these architectural, historical and geographic features help explain the neighbourhood's distinctive urban form and its place within Ottawa's built heritage.

Old Ottawa South, used to be known simply as "Ottawa South". The "old" designation came into use in the 1990s to distinguish the community from newer suburban developments in the south of Ottawa. "Old Ottawa South" is quite central and close to downtown by modern (post World War II) standards. The term "Ottawa South" is still in use in some contexts. For example, the community newspaper is The OSCAR, which stands for Ottawa South Community Association Review. Similarly, Old Ottawa South is not to be confused with the parliamentary constituency of Ottawa South. Old Ottawa South is currently located in the federal and provincial constituencies of Ottawa Centre, although Old Ottawa South was within the Ottawa South provincial riding until 1999.

In the fall of 2007, leading up to the 100th anniversary of the annexation of Ottawa South to the City of Ottawa on December 16, 2007, a group of residents founded the Ottawa South History Project (OSHP) to research, document and present facts and anecdotes about the history of the community. The OSHP is an amateur-run historical society which regularly publishes in The OSCAR and maintains a website. The group is also active in supporting the heritage designation of the Mayfair Theatre and is a partner in the Friends of the Mayfair Theatre.

== Notable residents ==
- Jim Watson – Former mayor of Ottawa, who lived in Old Ottawa South for nearly two decades before moving away in 2004.
- Paul Hellyer – Canadian politician who served as Minister of National Defence and Minister of Transport. A former Old Ottawa South resident, he lived near Brighton Beach in the neighbourhood.
- Samuel T. Bastedo – Canadian public servant who lived at 692 Echo Drive from 1913 until his death in 1927. He served as private secretary to Ontario premier Sir Oliver Mowat and as Superintendent of the federal Department of Annuities.

== See also ==
- List of Ottawa neighbourhoods
