= Bank Street (Ottawa) =

Street in Ottawa, Ontario, Canada

- "Ottawa Road 31"
- Map of Bank Street
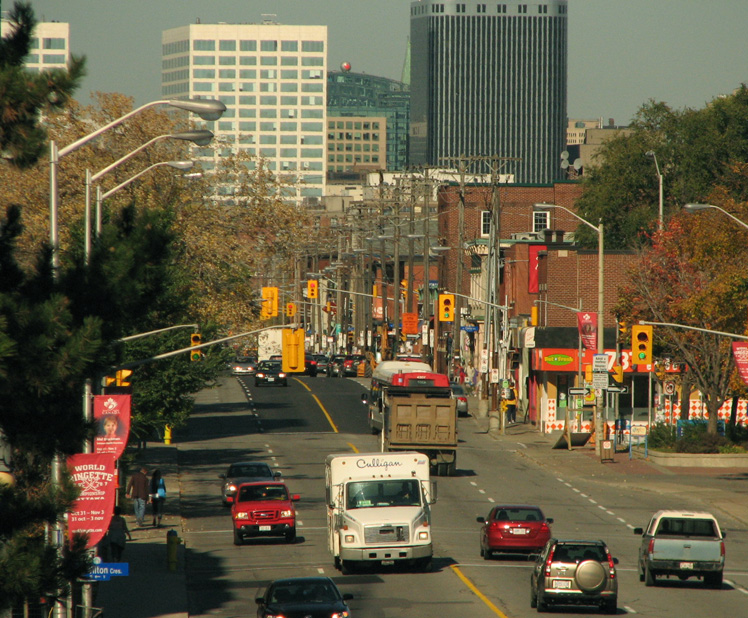
- Bank Street looking north in The Glebe

Route information
- Maintained by City of Ottawa
- Length: 39 km (24 mi)

Major junctions
- North end: Wellington Street
- South end: Continues as Stormont, Dundas and Glengarry county highway 31

Location
- Country: Canada
- Province: Ontario
- Major cities: Ottawa

Highway system
- Roads in Ontario

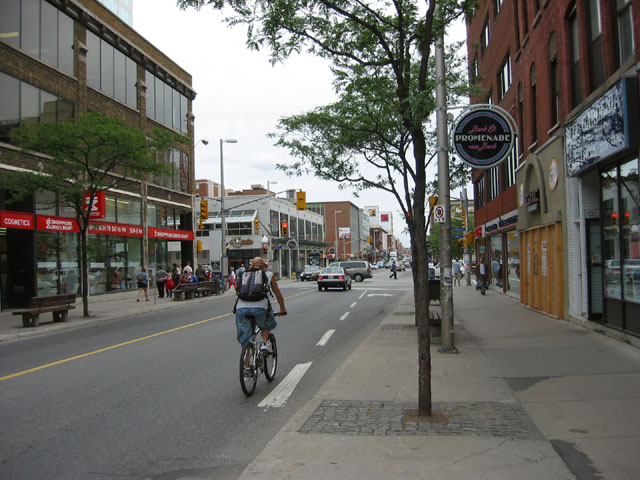
Bank Street near the intersection with Laurier Avenue in downtown Ottawa

Bank Street (French: Rue Bank) is the major commercial north–south street in Ottawa, Ontario, Canada. It runs south from Wellington Street in downtown Ottawa, south through the neighbourhoods of Centretown, The Glebe, Old Ottawa South, Alta Vista, Hunt Club, and then through the villages of Blossom Park, Leitrim, South Gloucester, Greely, Metcalfe, Spring Hill, and Vernon before ending at the city limit at Belmeade Road, becoming Stormont, Dundas and Glengarry county highway 31.

Bank Street made up much of Highway 31 before it was downloaded in 1998 (all of it south of Heron Road). Currently it is also known as Ottawa Road #31.

== Features ==
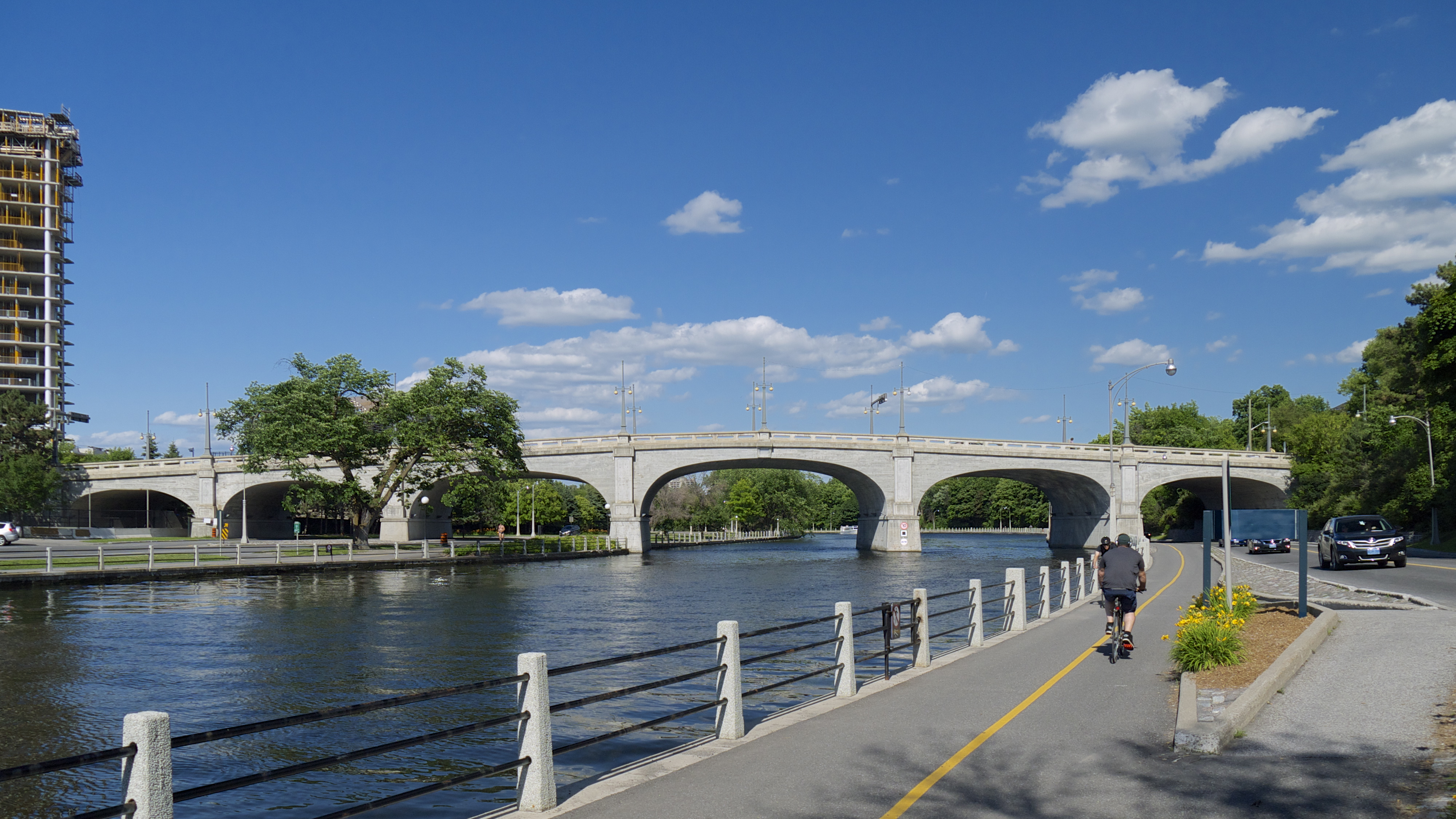
Bank Street bridge in 2014

Between Wellington Street and Gladstone Avenue in downtown, Bank Street is a shopping and business development district officially known as the "Bank Street Promenade" and the street is lined with common signage affixed to streetlights and street-level advertising billboards showing this distinction.

The area between Somerset Street West and Gladstone Avenue (within the Bank Street Promenade) is considered the centre of Ottawa's burgeoning gay village, characterized by a small concentration of businesses targeted to Ottawa's LGBT community. In 2011, the city officially unveiled signs identifying the neighbourhood as Ottawa's gay village, at the intersections of Somerset, James and Nepean Streets with Bank Street.

Travelling south, there exists a shopping district in The Glebe running exclusively along Bank Street from approximately the Queensway to Holmwood Avenue. Bank Street is home to Lansdowne Park where the Ottawa 67's and Ottawa RedBlacks play. Even further south, after the road passes over the Rideau Canal on the Bank Street Bridge, Bank Street is home to the Billings Bridge Plaza and eventually, the South Keys Shopping Centre.

Bank Street north of Billings Bridge is an historic urban arterial road with a 40 km/h speed limit, often with many more pedestrians than vehicular traffic and significant parking issues, hence the flow is generally quite slow. South of Billings Bridge to Leitrim Road, the street turns into a more modern four-lane (or five-lane) urban arterial, which flows much better despite the 50 km/h (31 mph) speed limit on the northern half and 60 km/h (about 37 mph) from South Keys southward. South of Leitrim it is a rural two-lane highway with an 80 km/h (50 mph) speed limit until the community of Vernon. Just south of Leitrim Road, Bank Street provides access to a developing neighborhood called Findlay Creek, and it will also provide access (after secondary roads are extended) to the community of Riverside South.

Bank Street also serves in some contexts as an unofficial division between "eastern" and "western" Ottawa. For example, prior to the takeover of Maclean-Hunter by Rogers Cable in 1994, the street marked the division between those cable companies' service areas in Ottawa: cable subscribers west of Bank Street were served by Maclean-Hunter, while cable subscribers east of Bank Street were served by Rogers.

== History ==
=== Name of the street ===
Contrary to popular belief, the street is not named after the Bank of Canada headquarters at the corner of Bank Street and Wellington Street. The street name dates back to the 19th century, whereas the bank was founded in 1934. It's believed that the road was named this because it originally went from the "bank" of the Ottawa River at its northern end to that of the Rideau River to the south. However, the road was originally called Esther Street in honour of Colonel By's wife. Bank Street officially ends at Wellington Street and the portion of the street running closest to the actual riverbank is federal Crown land for the Parliamentary Precinct of the Parliament of Canada. South of the Rideau River the road was previously named "Prescott Road".

=== As a Provincial Highway ===
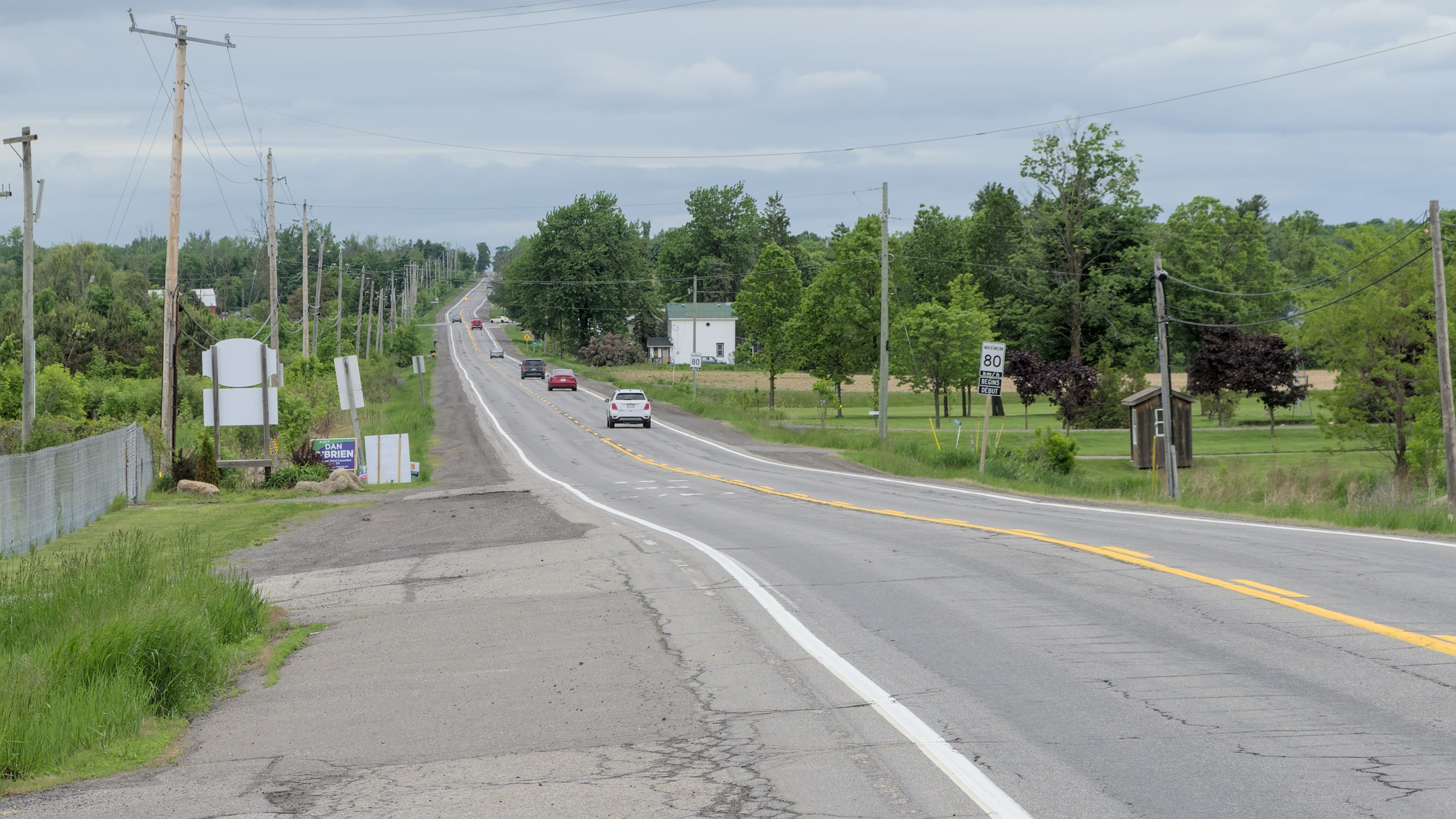
Rural section of Bank Street looking towards Dalmeny Road north of Vernon

Highway 31 was formed in 1927, and started at the junction of Highway 2 in Morrisburg, Ontario. It travelled north through the town of Winchester, and eventually into Ottawa. The road was paved in stages, but was fully paved by 1936. The road's designation of Highway 31 was extended from the Dundas-Stormont-Glengary/Russell-Prescott county line into Ottawa later that same year. While maintaining its alignment along Bank Street for its entire history, the road was re-aligned along Canal Drive (now today's Queen Elizabeth Driveway). From here, it became less clear where the northern terminus of the road was located, as Ottawa posted Highway 31 as a scenic route within its limits along Heron Road and Bronson Avenue (concurrent with Highway 16) before terminating in downtown, while the Ministry of Transportation noted no changes in road length (78 km / 48.8 mi). This is presumed to be a connecting link between Highway 31 and The Queensway (Highway 417), but these scenic routes/connecting links were all decommissioned by 1960. The road was also re-aligned along the Winchester Bypass, when it was completed and opened in 1974, but no other changes were made to the road since then, until being fully decommissioned as a provincial highway, in 1998.

=== Bank Street rehabilitation ===
Portions of Bank Street have undergone major reconstruction each year since 2006. The City of Ottawa held public consultations for a major redevelopment of Bank Street between Wellington Street and the Rideau Canal.

=== Retailers ===
- Foster’s Sports Centre: The store was located at 305 Bank Street and originally opened as Byles & Co. in 1916. It was renamed Foster & Byles Co. in 1970. The store closed in 2024.
- Hartt Shoe Company: The store opened in 1923 on the corner of Bank St. and Sparks St. in Ottawa, ON. The store was located within a block of Parliament Hill and operated until its closing in 1975. The store was remodelled in 1949.

== Major intersections (from North to South) ==
- Ottawa Road 34 (Wellington Street)
- Ottawa Road 48 (Laurier Avenue)
- Ottawa Road 36 (Somerset Street)
- Gladstone Avenue
- Highway 417
- Ottawa Road 19 (Riverside Drive)
- Ottawa Road 16 (Heron Road)
- Ottawa Road 103 (Alta Vista Drive)
- Walkley Road
- Ottawa Road 32 (Hunt Club Road)
- Albion Road
- Ottawa Road 125 (Conroy Road)
- Ottawa Road 14 (Leitrim Road)
- Ottawa Road 8 (Mitch Owens Road)
- Ottawa Road 6 (Snake Island Road)
- Ottawa Road 4 (Dalmeny Road)

== Areas/Communities ==
- Downtown Ottawa
- Centretown
- The Glebe
- Ottawa South
- Billings Bridge
- South Keys
- Blossom Park
- Findlay Creek/Leitrim
- Greely
- Metcalfe
- Vernon
