= Ottawa West—Nepean (federal electoral district) =

Federal electoral district in Ontario, Canada

Coordinates: 45°21′N 75°47′W

Ontario electoral district
- Interactive map of riding boundaries from the 2025 federal election

Federal electoral district
- Legislature: House of Commons
MP
Anita Vandenbeld
Liberal
- District created: 1996
- First contested: 1997
- Last contested: 2021
- District webpage: profile, map

Demographics
- Population (2016): 111,837
- Electors (2015): 81,646
- Area (km²): 71
- Pop. density (per km²): 1,575.2
- Census division: Ottawa
- Census subdivision: Ottawa (part)

Ottawa West—Nepean (French: Ottawa-Ouest—Nepean) is a federal electoral district in Ontario, Canada, that has been represented in the House of Commons of Canada since 1997.

== Geography ==
The district includes the neighbourhoods of Ambleside, Bayshore, Bel-Air Park, Bel-Air Heights, Borden Farm, Braemar Park, Briargreen, Britannia, Carleton Heights, the western half of Carlington, Centrepointe, City View, Copeland Park, Crestview, Crystal Beach, Fisher Glen, Fisher Heights, Glabar Park, Kenson Park, Leslie Park, Lincoln Heights, Navaho, Parkwood Hills, Qualicum-Graham Park, Queensway Terrace North, Queensway Terrace South, Foster Farm, Redwood, Rocky Point, Ryan Farm, Shirleys Bay, Skyline, Whitehaven, Woodpark, and Woodroffe. All these neighbourhoods are located in the City of Ottawa, with many of them having been part of the former City of Nepean.

== History ==
The electoral district was created in 1996 from Ottawa West, Nepean and part of Lanark—Carleton ridings.

=== 2012 Federal Redistribution ===
The 2012 federal redistribution saw the riding gain a small portion from Ottawa Centre, but it remained largely unchanged.

=== 2022 Federal Redistribution ===
The 2022 Canadian federal electoral redistribution resulted in several boundary changes to the riding.

The eastern riding boundary along Merivale Road was pushed further east to Fisher Avenue. As a consequence, the entire Carlington neighbourhood (not just the western portion) became part of the riding.

The north-east boundary also shifted east, from Maitland Avenue and Sherbourne Road to Golden Avenue and then along Carling Avenue to the 417 Highway. Consequently, the McKellar Park and McKellar Heights neighbourhoods were reassigned from the Ottawa Centre riding into Ottawa West—Nepean.

A small corner of the riding between Merivale Avenue on the West and the Rideau River on the east, and from the railroad tracks in the north to West Hunt Club Road in the south, was moved from Ottawa West-Nepean to Nepean. While largely retail-commercial in nature, it includes a number of residential homes along or near Prince of Wales Dr.

The north-west boundary was moved east from Herzberg Road to Davidson Side Road north of Carling Avenue. That portion was moved into the Kanata (formerly the Kanata-Carleton) riding. It is a rural area which includes a large area of Federal lands, and so is of small consequence to elector counts.

== Demographics ==
According to the 2021 Canadian census, 2023 representation order

Racial groups: 63.0% White, 8.9% Black, 6.7% South Asian, 5.1% Arab, 4.4% Chinese, 2.8% Indigenous, 2.2% Southeast Asian, 1.9% Filipino, 1.4% Latin American, 1.3% West Asian
Languages: 66.3% English, 8.9% French, 4.0% Arabic, 1.9% Mandarin, 1.6% Italian, 1.4% Spanish, 1.1% Cantonese, 1.1% Somali, 1.0% Vietnamese
Religions: 49.0% Christian (26.0% Catholic, 4.2% Anglican, 3.7% United Church, 2.2% Christian Orthodox, 1.3% Pentecostal, 11.6% Other), 10.4% Muslim, 3.1% Hindu, 1.9% Jewish, 1.4% Buddhist, 32.4% None
Median income: $43,600 (2020)
Average income: $57,200 (2020)

== Members of Parliament ==
This riding has elected the following members of Parliament:

Parliament	Years	Member	Party
Ottawa West—Nepean; Riding created from Ottawa West, Nepean and Lanark—Carleton
36th	1997–2000	Marlene Catterall	Liberal
37th	2000–2004	Marlene Catterall	Liberal
38th	2004–2006	Marlene Catterall	Liberal
39th	2006–2008	John Baird	Conservative
40th	2008–2011	John Baird	Conservative
41st	2011–2015	John Baird	Conservative
42nd	2015–2019	Anita Vandenbeld	Liberal
43rd	2019–2021	Anita Vandenbeld	Liberal
44th	2021–2025	Anita Vandenbeld	Liberal
45th	2025–present	Anita Vandenbeld	Liberal

In the 2004 federal election, Marlene Catterall defeated Conservative Party candidate Sean Casey in a very close election.

In the 2006 federal election, Catterall stepped aside, and high-profile Progressive Conservative Member of Provincial Parliament, John Baird, contested and won the riding for the Conservative Party.

Until February 3, 2015, he was a member of the cabinet of Prime Minister Stephen Harper as Minister of Foreign Affairs. He has also previously served as President of the Treasury Board, then Minister of the Environment, then as Government House Leader. Baird resigned from the House of Commons on March 16, 2015.

== Riding associations ==
Riding associations are the local branches of national political parties:

Party	Association name	President	HQ City
Conservative	Ottawa West—Nepean Conservative Association	David Baker	Ottawa
Christian Heritage	CHP Ottawa West—Nepean	David A. Darwin	Ottawa
Green	Ottawa West—Nepean Green Party Association	vacant	Ottawa
Liberal	Ottawa West—Nepean Federal Liberal Association	Christie Boyd	Ottawa
New Democratic	Ottawa West—Nepean Federal NDP Riding Association	Stephen Yardy	Ottawa

== Election results ==
Graph of election results in Ottawa West—Nepean (minor parties that never got 2% of the vote or didn't run consistently are omitted) View source data.

2025 Canadian federal election
Party	Candidate	Votes	%	±%
Liberal	Anita Vandenbeld	43,555	63.64	+18.22
Conservative	Ryan Telford	18,517	27.05	–0.61
New Democratic	Josh Bizjak	4,847	7.08	–13.13
Green	Prashanta Dhakal	780	1.14	–1.75
People's	Glen Armstrong	514	0.75	–2.45
Christian Heritage	Sean Mulligan	232	0.34	-0.17
Total valid votes		68,445	99.29	
Total rejected ballots		492	0.71	-0.05
Turnout		68,937	72.25	+3.62
Eligible voters		95,412		
Liberal notional hold		Swing		+9.41
Source: Elections Canada

2021 federal election redistributed results
Party	Vote	%
Liberal	29,159	45.42
Conservative	17,761	27.67
New Democratic	12,979	20.22
People's	2,056	3.20
Green	1,853	2.89
Christian Heritage	326	0.51
Animal Protection	31	0.05
Independent	20	0.03
Communist	15	0.02
Total valid votes	64,200	99.23
Rejected ballots	497	0.77
Registered voters/ estimated turnout	96,262	68.64

2021 Canadian federal election: Ottawa West—Nepean
Party	Candidate	Votes	%	±%	Expenditures
Liberal	Anita Vandenbeld	25,889	45.1	-0.5	$74,328.64
Conservative	Jennifer Jennekens	16,473	28.7	+1.6	$45,178.66
New Democratic	Yavar Hameed	11,163	19.4	+0.7	$32,726.98
People's	David Yeo	1,908	3.3	+2.0	$1,796.57
Green	David Stibbe	1,642	2.9	-3.4	$5,093.29
Christian Heritage	Sean Mulligan	327	0.6	–	$2,649.96
Total valid votes/expense limit		57,402	–	–	$115,138.30
Total rejected ballots		447			
Turnout		57,849			
Eligible voters		84,392			
Source: Elections Canada

2019 Canadian federal election: Ottawa West—Nepean
Party	Candidate	Votes	%	±%	Expenditures
Liberal	Anita Vandenbeld	27,599	45.6	-10.08	$70,538.89
Conservative	Abdul Abdi	16,491	27.1	-2.78	none listed
New Democratic	Angela MacEwen	11,401	18.7	+8.9	$61,020.24
Green	David Stibbe	3,823	6.3	+3.5	none listed
People's	Serge Guevorkian	820	1.3	–	$0.00
Christian Heritage	Sean Mulligan	350	0.6	-0.57	$2,235.59
Total valid votes/expense limit		62,206	100.0		$109,420.82 EST
Total rejected ballots		602	0.96	–	
Turnout		62,808	72.62	–	
Eligible voters		86,485			
Liberal hold		Swing		+14.11%	
Source: Elections Canada

2015 Canadian federal election
Party	Candidate	Votes	%	±%	Expenditures
Liberal	Anita Vandenbeld	35,199	55.68	+24.19	$125,416.75
Conservative	Abdul Abdi	18,893	29.88	-14.81	$195,500.69
New Democratic	Marlene Rivier	6,195	9.80	-9.98	$48,825.54
Green	Mark Brooks	1,772	2.80	-1.24	$5,327.90
Christian Heritage	Rod Taylor	740	1.17	–	$34,473.80
Marxist–Leninist	Sam Heaton	114	0.18	–	–
Total valid votes/Expense limit		62,913	100.0		$219,678.06
Total rejected ballots		307	0.49	–	
Turnout		63,220	75.99	–	
Eligible voters		83,195			
Liberal gain from Conservative		Swing		+19.5%	
Source: Elections Canada

2011 federal election redistributed results
Party	Vote	%
Conservative	25,297	44.69
Liberal	17,825	31.49
New Democratic	11,196	19.78
Green	2,285	4.04
Others	4	0.01

2011 Canadian federal election
Party	Candidate	Votes	%	±%	Expenditures
Conservative	John Baird	25,226	44.71	-0.27	$85,279.84
Liberal	Anita Vandenbeld	17,790	31.53	-4.59	$83,063.37
New Democratic	Marlene Rivier	11,128	19.72	+8.20	$27,580.67
Green	Mark Mackenzie	2,279	4.04	-2.32	$16,343.75
Total valid votes/Expense limit		56,423	100.00		$88,802.24
Total rejected ballots		292	0.51	–	
Turnout		56,715	69.42	–	
Eligible voters		81,693	–	–	
Conservative hold		Swing		-2.43	
Source: Elections Canada

2008 Canadian federal election
Party	Candidate	Votes	%	±%	Expenditures
Conservative	John Baird	25,109	44.98	+1.85	$83,719
Liberal	David Pratt	20,161	36.12	+2.03	$84,627
New Democratic	Marlene Rivier	6,432	11.52	-4.60	$30,086
Green	Frances Coates	3,552	6.36	+1.42	$9,565
Independent	David Page	415	0.74	+0.74	
Communist	Alex McDonald	150	0.28	+0.28	
Total valid votes/Expense limit		55,819	100.00		$87,796
Conservative hold		Swing		-0.09	

2006 Canadian federal election
Party	Candidate	Votes	%	±%	Expenditures
Conservative	John Baird	25,607	43.13	+3.93	$73,698
Liberal	Lee Farnworth	20,244	34.09	-7.50	$71,412
New Democratic	Marlene Rivier	9,569	16.12	+3.20	$24,830
Green	Neil Adair	2,932	4.94	+0.17	$975
Independent	John Pacheco	905	1.52		$16,672
Canadian Action	Randy Bens	121	0.20	-0.45	$620
Total valid votes/Expense limit		59,378	100.00		

2004 Canadian federal election
Party	Candidate	Votes	%	±%
Liberal	Marlene Catterall	23,971	41.59	-1.73
Conservative	Sean Casey	22,591	39.20	-9.20
New Democratic	Marlene Rivier	7,449	12.92	+7.72
Green	Neil Adair	2,748	4.77	+3.65
Marijuana	Russell Barth	430	0.75	-0.06
Canadian Action	Mary-Sue Haliburton	376	0.65	-0.07
Marxist–Leninist	Alecander Legeais	68	0.12	
Total valid votes		57,633	100.00	

2000 Canadian federal election
Party	Candidate	Votes	%	±%
Liberal	Marlene Catterall	22,607	43.32	-10.69
Alliance	Barry Yeates	14,753	28.27	+7.04
Progressive Conservative	Tom Curran	10,506	20.13	+4.59
New Democratic	Kevin Kinsella	2,718	5.21	-2.41
Green	Matt Takach	585	0.36	
Marijuana	Sotos Petrides	423	0.81	
Canadian Action	David Creighton	376	0.72	
Independent	John Turmel	89	0.17	-0.22
Communist	Stuart Ryan	70	0.13	
Natural Law	Richard Wolfson	58	0.11	-0.17
Total valid votes		52,185	100.00	

1997 Canadian federal election
Party	Candidate	Votes	%
Liberal	Marlene Catterall	29,511	54.02
Reform	Barry Yeates	11,601	21.23
Progressive Conservative	Margret Kopala	8,489	15.54
New Democratic	Wendy Byrne	4,163	7.62
Green	Stuart Langstaff	416	0.76
Independent	John Turmel	211	0.39
Natural Law	Stan Lamothe	153	0.28
Marxist–Leninist	Marsha Fine	90	0.16
Total valid votes		54,634	100.00

== See also ==
- List of Canadian electoral districts
- Historical federal electoral districts of Canada
