= Foster Farm =

- Neighbourhood
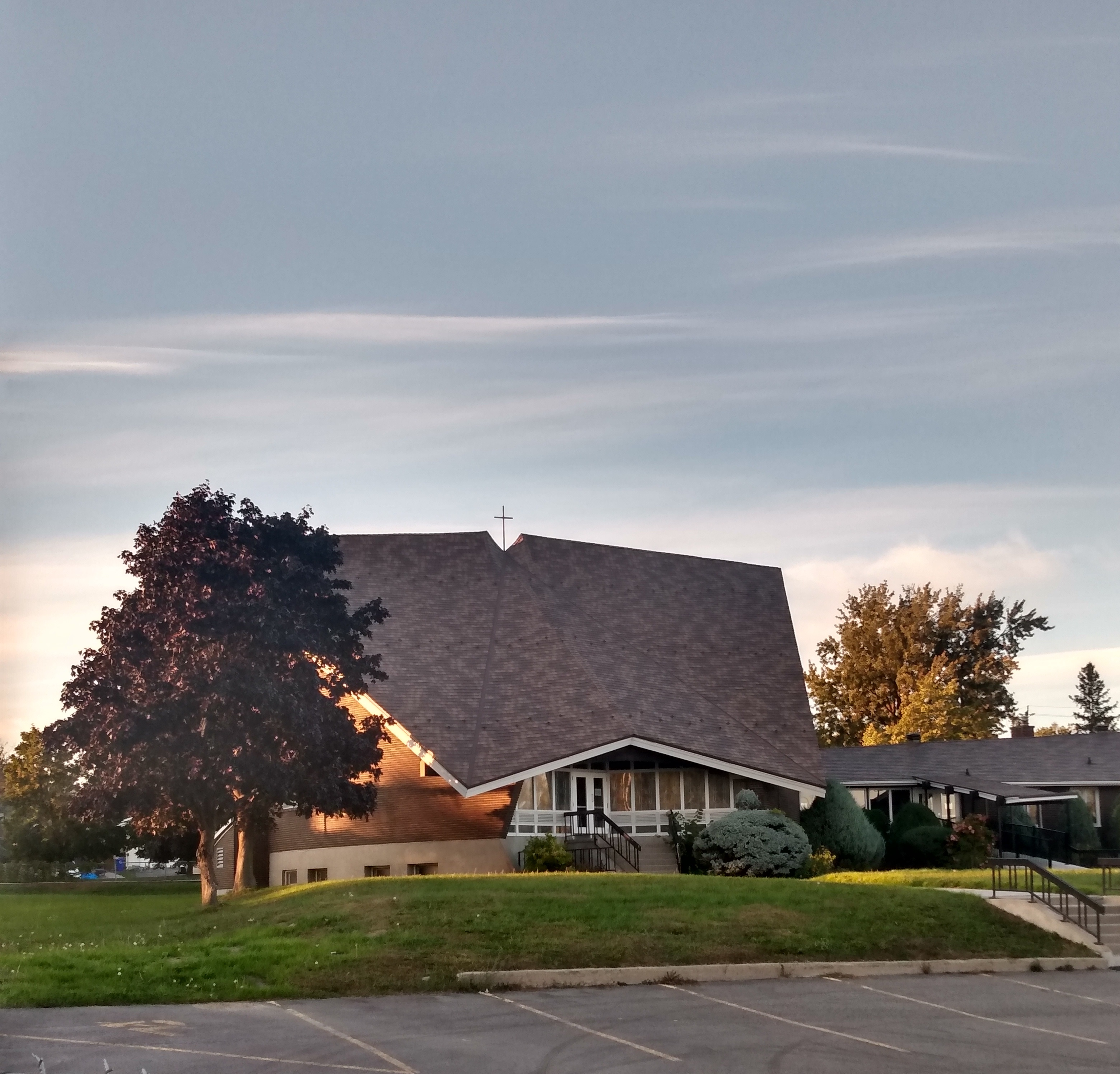
- St-Rémi Parish
- Motto: "Neighbours helping neighbours"
- Location within Ottawa
- Coordinates: 45°21′00″N 75°47′45″W
- Country: Canada
- Province: Ontario
- City: Ottawa

Government
  - MPs: Anita Vandenbeld
  - MPPs: Chandra Pasma
  - Councillors: Theresa Kavanagh

Area
  - Total: 0.64 km^{2} (0.25 sq mi)
- Elevation: 80 m (260 ft)

Population (2016)
  - Total: 3,636
  - Density: 5,700/km^{2} (15,000/sq mi)
- Canada 2016 Census
- Time zone: UTC-5 (Eastern (EST))
- Forward sortation area: K2B

Foster Farm, nicknamed "the Farm", is a neighbourhood in the Britannia area of Bay Ward in the west end of Ottawa, Ontario, Canada. It is roughly bounded to the north by Richmond Road, to the east by Pinecrest Road, to the west by the former Ottawa/Nepean city limits and the south by the Highway 417, the Queensway. It is bordered by Fairfield Heights, Queensway Terrace North, Redwood, Michele Heights. The total population of this area according to the 2016 Canada Census was 3,636.

== History ==
The neighbourhood was named after the original owner of the land. The northeast corner of the neighbourhood began to be built in the 1920s as an extension of the Britannia Heights subdivision. The neighbourhood continued to be developed in the 1960s around the 1980s and around 2000. In 1970, Ottawa City Council approved the site for public housing. The Ottawa Housing Corporation Foster Farm social housing project, of which the neighbourhood is synonymous, was built in 1973.

The residential housing consists from middle class two story houses, and duplexes to high rises and townhouses.

== Facilities ==
There are community housing projects and a high rise apartment on Ramsey Crescent and Dumaurier. The high rise apartment on Ramsey Crescent is home to the Foster Farm Daycare. Behind the high rise is a shopping strip featuring an appliance store and a few take out food places. Next door is the Boys and Girls Club community centre featuring meeting rooms, a gymnasium, and an indoor swimming pool.

The community has many amenities close by. There are three parks, Barwell Park, Ruth Wildgen Park featuring an outdoor pool, tennis and basketball courts, and a small baseball diamond. The other park (Dumaurier) is at Pinecrest and Dumaurier featuring large Slo-Pitch diamonds. Malls in the area include the Pinecrest Shopping Centre and Bayshore Shopping Centre. There are two churches, St. Stephen's Anglican and Paroisse St-Rémi French Catholic. It is home to Abarrar School owned by the Muslim Association of Canada on Grenon Avenue. The school used to be Franco Nation.
