= Wendy Byrne =

Canadian lawyer and politician

Ottawa-Carleton Regional Councillor
- In office January 1, 1998 – January 1, 2001
- Preceded by: Alex Cullen
- Succeeded by: Alex Cullen (Ottawa City Council)
- Constituency: Bay Ward

Personal details
- Born: 1957 (age 68–69) Toronto, Ontario
- Party: New Democratic Party
- Children: Aimee and Jimmy

Wendy Elizabeth Byrne (born 1957) is a Canadian lawyer and politician from Ottawa, Ontario. She is a former Ottawa-Carleton Regional Councillor.

Byrne ran for political office twice in 1997. In June of that year, she ran for the New Democratic Party in the riding of Ottawa West—Nepean, but only received 7.6% of the vote. In November however, she was elected in the Ottawa-Carleton regional elections in the seat of Bay Ward. She ran on a platform of preserving green space, opposing downloading taxes to property owners and opposed the expansion of the Champlain Bridge. She also supported the preservation of non-profit housing and a transit strategy of smaller buses and light rail. She had defeated her closest rival by less than 200 votes in close 4-way race. While on council, she served as vice-chair of the region's Community Services Committee and as a member of the Regional Transit Commission. She served just one term, as the Region was abolished upon the amalgamation of Ottawa in 2000.

Byrne was the Ontario New Democratic Party candidate in Ottawa West—Nepean for the 2011 provincial election. Byrne received 14.8% of the vote, an increase of 6.3% over the previous by-election results in 2010.

Before being elected, Byrne was a community organizer and was a director and vice president at a credit union. She practised law in Ottawa, Ontario from 1995 to 1997 and from 2000 to 2008 and 2011 to 2016, and practised law in Calgary, Alberta from 2008 to 2011. Byrne now resides in Victoria, British Columbia where she works for the Government of British Columbia.

== Electoral record ==
2011 Ontario general election: Ottawa West—Nepean
Party	Candidate	Votes	%	±%	Expenditures
Liberal	Bob Chiarelli	18,492	41.62	−1.83	$ 93,241.85
Progressive Conservative	Randall Denley	17,483	39.35	+0.36	80,950.00
New Democratic	Wendy Byrne	6,576	14.80	+6.35	13,936.09
Green	Alex Hill	1,485	3.34	−4.96	3,113.29
Family Coalition	John Pacheco	396	0.89		8,382.66
Total valid votes / expense limit		44,432	100.00	+56.27	$ 97,809.67
Total rejected, unmarked and declined ballots		174	0.39	−0.18	
Turnout		44,606	54.27	+21.33	
Eligible voters		82,187		−5.32	
Liberal hold		Swing		−1.10	
Source(s) "Summary of Valid Votes Cast for Each Candidate – October 6, 2011 General Election" (PDF). "Statistical Summary – General Elections 2011" ( XLS Spreadsheet (71KB)). Elections Ontario. "2011 Candidate Campaign Returns (CR-1)".

1997 Ottawa-Carleton Regional Municipality Elections: Bay Ward
Candidate	Votes	%
Wendy Byrne	3,199	29.43
Peter Harris	3,017	27.75
Frank Dalton	2,041	18.77
David Morrow	1,871	17.21
Victoria Manson	595	5.47
Douglas Besharah	148	1.36

1997 Canadian federal election
Party	Candidate	Votes	%
Liberal	Marlene Catterall	29,511	54.02
Reform	Barry Yeates	11,601	21.23
Progressive Conservative	Margret Kopala	8,489	15.54
New Democratic	Wendy Byrne	4,163	7.62
Green	Stuart Langstaff	416	0.76
Independent	John Turmel	211	0.39
Natural Law	Stan Lamothe	153	0.28
Marxist–Leninist	Marsha Fine	90	0.16
Total valid votes		54,634	100.00
