= 1985 Ottawa municipal election =

Election in Ontario, Canada

1985 Ottawa mayoral election
- November 12, 1985
Candidate	Jim Durrell	Marlene Catterall
Popular vote	56,988	35,711
Percentage	59.95%	37.57%
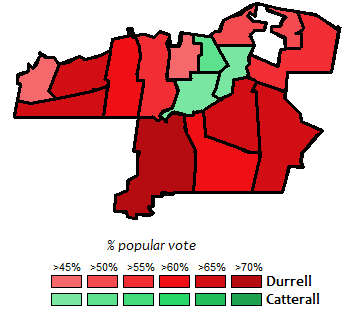
- Results by ward
Mayor before election
Marion Dewar
Elected mayor
Jim Durrell

The city of Ottawa, Canada held municipal elections on November 12, 1985.

Riverside Ward alderman Jim Durrell defeated Britannia Ward alderman Marlene Catterall to become the new mayor of Ottawa.

== Mayor ==
Durrell swept 12 of the city's 15 wards en route to victory, doing particularly well in the city's suburbs. His best ward was Riversdie, which he represented on council, where he won 72% of the vote. Catterall won the remaining three wards, all in the inner-city. Her strongest ward was Wellington, the only one where she won a majority of the vote. There, she won 52% of the vote. Catterall was not even able to win her home ward of Britannia, which she lost by 108 votes.

Candidate	Votes	%
Jim Durrell	56,988	59.95
Marlene Catterall	35,711	37.57
R. Allan Jones	942	0.99
Walter J. McPhee	886	0.93
Nabil Fawzry	529	0.56

== City council ==
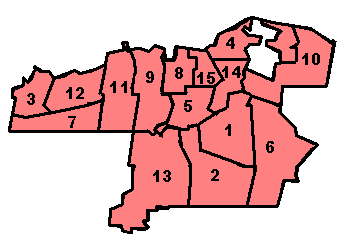
Map of Ottawa's Wards used in this election: 1. Alta Vista Ward; 2. Billings Ward; 3. Britannia Ward; 4. By-Rideau Ward; 5. Capital Ward; 6. Canterbury Ward; 7. Carleton Ward; 8. Dalhousie Ward; 9. Elmdale Ward; 10. Overbrook-Forbes Ward; 11. Queensboro Ward; 12. Richmond Ward; 13. Riverside Ward; 14. St. George's Ward; 15. Wellington Ward .

Alta Vista Ward
Candidate	Votes	%
Darrel Kent	2,927	36.57
Dylan McGuinty	2,725	34.05
Angie Herzog	1,831	22.87
Phil Massad	353	4.41
Rebecca Liff	169	2.11

Billings Ward
Candidate	Votes	%
Joan O'Neill	3,202	59.86
Bill Zlepnig	1,776	33.20
John Kroeker	371	6.94

Britannia Ward
Candidate	Votes	%
Ruth Wildgen	1,310	24.45
Jim Jones	1,263	23.57
Greg Ross	1,083	20.21
Sandra Presley	972	18.14
Bud Downing	350	6.53
Kurt Orlik	204	3.81
Donald Holmes	176	3.28

By-Rideau Ward
Candidate	Votes	%
Marc Laviolette (X)	4,343	72.61
Wayne MacKinnon	1,638	27.39

Capital Ward
Candidate	Votes	%
Rob Quinn	2,612	37.93
David Hagerman	1,880	27.30
Howard Smith (X)	1,603	23.28
Susan Pond	791	11.49

Canterbury Ward
Candidate	Votes	%
Michael McSweeney (X)	5,197	73.46
Ernest Lauzon	1,878	26.54

Carleton Ward
Candidate	Votes	%
Bob Morrison (X)	2,377	36.81
Tim Kehoe	2,288	35.43
Barbara Lejeunesse	1,792	27.75

Queensboro Ward
Candidate	Votes	%
Mark Maloney	2,902	41.22
Gordon MacMichael	1,846	26.22
Mary Hegan	1,731	24.58
Phil MacNeill	562	7.98

Dalhousie Ward
Candidate	Votes	%
Mac Harb	1,780	36.17
Denis LeBlanc	1,725	35.05
Michael Janigan	1,416	28.77

Elmdale Ward
Candidate	Votes	%
Jamie Fisher	1,780	35.32
Penina Coopersmith	1,375	27.28
Steve Grattan	1,063	21.09
Ed Barter	822	16.31

Overbrook-Forbes Ward
Candidate	Votes	%
George Kelly	2,391	48.12
Claudette Cyr-Smith	1,636	32.92
Gillian Sloan	942	18.96

Richmond Ward
Candidate	Votes	%
Jacquelin Holzman (X)	Acclaimed	

Riverside Ward
Candidate	Votes	%
George Brown	3,746	44.45
Fidel Palumbo	2,206	26.17
Marc Wallace	1,336	15.85
Tom Quinn	1,140	13.53

St. George's Ward
Candidate	Votes	%
Nancy Smith (X)	2,997	51.43
Rheal Leroux	2,699	46.32
Serge Girard	131	2.25

Wellington Ward
Candidate	Votes	%
Diane Holmes (X)	2,902	69.98
Terry McLaughlin	1,245	30.02

== Ottawa Board of Education Trustees ==
Two to be elected in each zone

Zone 1 (Vanier, Rockcliffe Park, By-Rideau, St. George's, Overbrook-Forbes)	Vote	%
Jane Dobell	6,685	
Harriet Lang	3,934	
Gary Hough	3,340	

Zone 2 (Capital, Wellington)	Vote	%
John Smart (X)	3,513	
Brian McGarry	3,030	
D. Paterson	2.989	
Don Francis (X)	2,253	
Gord Hauser	1,337	
James Bowie-Reed	712	

Zone 3 (Dalhousie, Riverside, Elmdale)	Vote	%
Marian Lothian	4,523	
Ted Best (X)	4,360	
Sandra Goldstein (X)	2,850	
Julia Brady	2,524	
Terry Kilrea	1,710	
Bente Addison	1,683	
Harry Albright	1,104	
Barry Lemoine	648	

Zone 4 (Britannia, Richmond)	Vote	%
Bill Gowling (X)	4,273	
Robert Beatty (X)	3,377	
Wayne Wilson	2,512	
Margo Deriger	2,191	
E. C. Stoddon	1,103	
Dale Alkerton	1,111	
John Teller	818	
Larry Arpaia	713	

Zone 5 (Carleton, Queensboro)	Vote	%
Alex Cullen (X)	3,222	
Kathy Yach	3,067	
Brian Mackay	2,968	
Beth Little	2,299	
C. J. Kempffer	1,018	
Kevin Kinsella	875	

Zone 6 (Alta Vista, Billings, Canterbury)	Vote	%
Marjorie Loughrey	5,652	
Russ Jackson (X)	5,296	
Roy Bushfield (X)	5,085	
Arthur Dufays	2,324	
Brian Elliott	1,599	
Leonard Haggstrom	519	

Four to be elected

Separate school: Ottawa	Vote	%
Dalton McGuinty, Sr. (X)	16,346	
Robert Belanger (X)	16,278	
Jacques Beauchamp (X)	15,822	
Frank Dalton	13,302	
Lucien Bradet (X)	12,560	
Patrick Holt	10,188	

One to be elected

Separate school: Vanier	Vote	%
Claudette Boyer	2,653	54.55
Denise Matte	2,210	45.45
