= 1988 Ottawa municipal election =

Election in Ontario, Canada

1988 Ottawa mayoral election
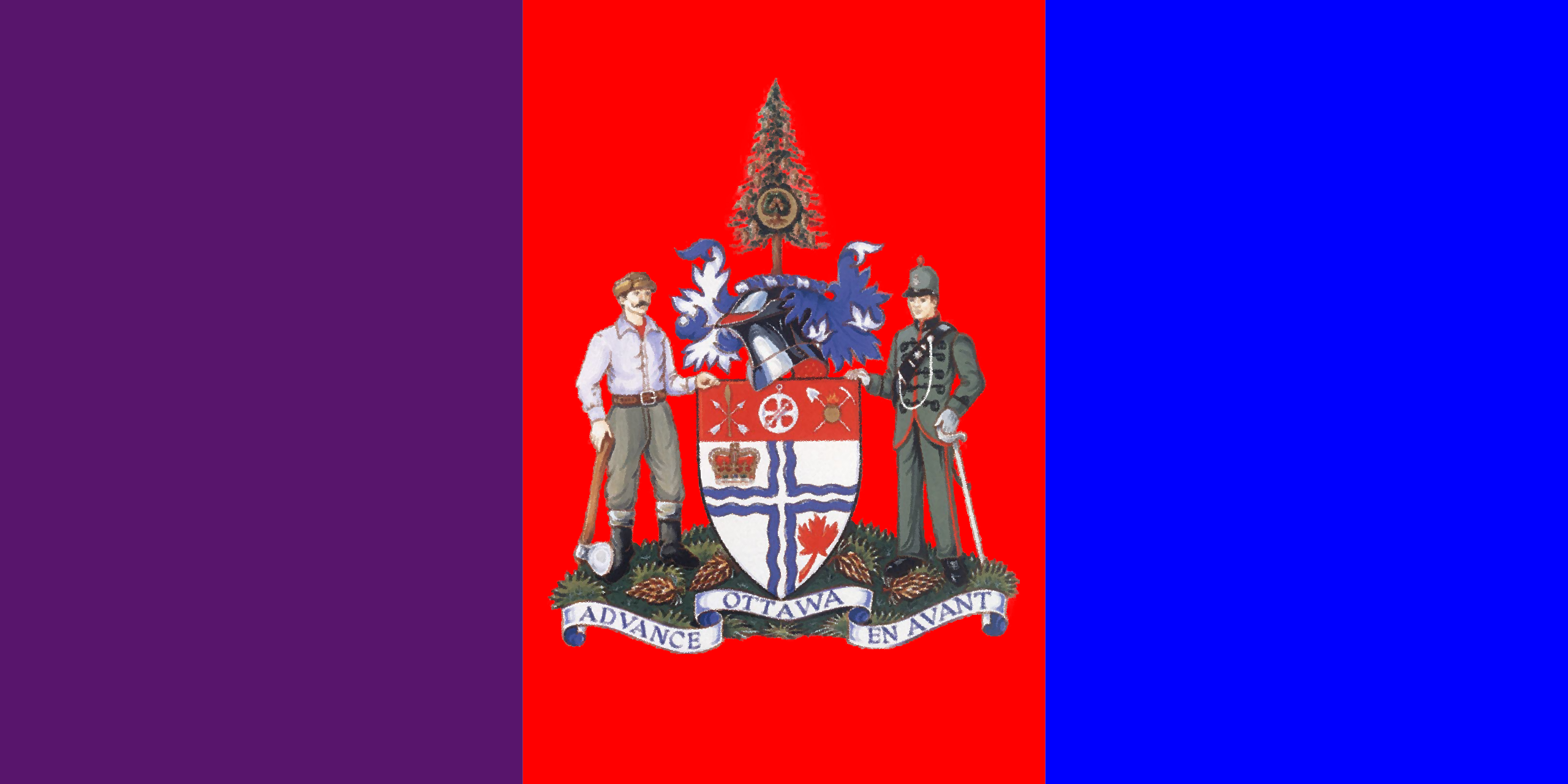
- November 14, 1988
Candidate	Jim Durrell	Michael Bartholomew
Popular vote	69,813	4,800
Percentage	86.77%	5.97%
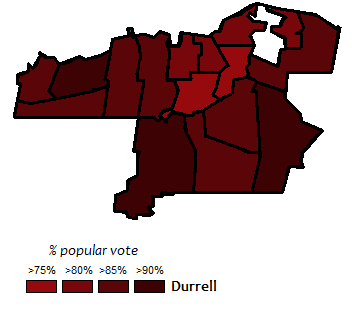
- Results by ward
Mayor before election
Jim Durrell
Elected mayor
Jim Durrell

The city of Ottawa, Canada held municipal elections on November 14, 1988.

Mayor Jim Durrell was re-elected with little opposition. Rideau Street businessman Michael Bartholomew finished 2nd with just 6% of the vote. Due to the lack of competition, only about one third of the electorate participated in the election.

== Mayor ==
Candidate	Votes	%
Jim Durrell (X)	69,813	86.77
Michael Bartholomew	4,800	5.97
John Turmel	3,123	3.88
John Kroeker	1,704	2.12
Nabil Fawzry	1,022	1.27

== Plebiscite ==
A plebiscite was held asking voters if they supported establishing a single level of municipal government for the urban part of the Regional Municipality of Ottawa-Carleton. It was a non binding plebiscite, and was only held in Ottawa. The measure was supported by mayor Durrell. The city would eventually amalgamate with the region in 2001, including the non-urban areas.

The ballot question read "Are you in favour of the City of Ottawa working towards one level of municipal government for the urban area of Ottawa-Carleton?"

Choice	Votes	%
Yes	64,862	81.11
No	15,102	18.89

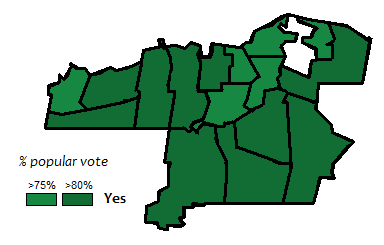
Plebiscite results by ward. Support was the strongest in Riverside Ward (84.2%) and the weakest in St. George's Ward (76.4%).

== City council ==
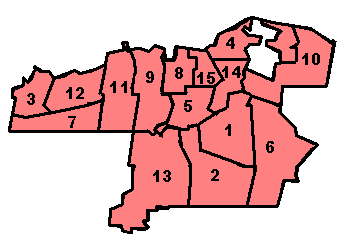
Map of Ottawa's Wards used in this election: 1. Alta Vista Ward; 2. Billings Ward; 3. Britannia Ward; 4. By-Rideau Ward; 5. Capital Ward; 6. Canterbury Ward; 7. Carleton Ward; 8. Dalhousie Ward; 9. Elmdale Ward; 10. Overbrook-Forbes Ward; 11. Queensboro Ward; 12. Richmond Ward; 13. Riverside Ward; 14. St. George's Ward; 15. Wellington Ward .

The composition of Ottawa's city council was more left leaning than the previous council due to the defeat of Durrell-ally Bob Morrison in Carleton Ward and the election of New Democratic Party backed candidates Lynn Smyth and Michael Jannigan. Jannigan, who was declared elected on election night had to wait over a year to take his seat however, as a recount gave his opponent the win, but after the case was taken to court, a special election was held in 1989 which Jannigan won.

Alta Vista Ward
Candidate	Votes	%
Darrel Kent (X)	Acclaimed	

Billings Ward
Candidate	Votes	%
Joan O'Neill (X)	4,170	84.36
Eugene Mallay	773	15.64

Britannia Ward
Candidate	Votes	%
Jim Jones	1,941*	40.79
Ruth Wildgen (X)	1,931*	40.58
Geoffrey Sharpe	496	10.42
Jenny Lee Lapointe	391	8.22

* Results after a recount.

By-Rideau Ward
Candidate	Votes	%
Marc Laviolette (X)	4,395	78.11
Les MacAfee	872	15.50
Richard Beaudry	360	6.40

Capital Ward
Candidate	Votes	%
Lynn Smyth	3,370	56.16
Rob Quinn (X)	2,631	43.84

Canterbury Ward
Candidate	Votes	%
Michael McSweeney (X)	5,592	76.33
Ernest Lauzon	1,734	23.67

Carleton Ward
Candidate	Votes	%
Tim Kehoe	2,480	49.03
Bob Morrison (X)	1,378	27.24
Mary Nash	1,200	23.72

Queensboro Ward
Candidate	Votes	%
Mark Maloney (X)	Acclaimed	

Dalhousie Ward
Candidate	Votes	%
Peter Harris	2,024*	46.12
Michael Janigan	2,022*	46.07
Richard Lobb	343	7.81

* Results after a recount.

Elmdale Ward
Candidate	Votes	%
Jamie Fisher (X)	Acclaimed	

Overbrook-Forbes Ward
Candidate	Votes	%
George Kelly (X)	Acclaimed	

Richmond Ward
Candidate	Votes	%
Jacquelin Holzman (X)	4,380	52.04
Alex Cullen	2,391	28.41
Daniel Stringer	1,646	19.56

Riverside Ward
Candidate	Votes	%
George Brown (X)	4,531	85.30
Norman Van Cleaf	781	14.70

St. George's Ward
Candidate	Votes	%
Nancy Smith (X)	3,757	82.94
Ed Barter	773	17.06

Wellington Ward
Candidate	Votes	%
Diane Holmes (X)	3,260	80.61
Lindsay Blackett	784	19.39

=== Special election ===
The election day results in Dalhousie Ward showed Michael Janigan ahead by 12 votes over Peter Harris, but this was done in error. A recount gave Harris a 2 vote win, but Janigan took the results to court, so the city held a special election on November 20, 1989 to resolve the matter, which Janigan won. Harris served as alderman in the interim. The race was a proxy battle for federal politics, with Janigan being supported by the NDP and Harris by the Liberals. The fringe candidates were backed by parties too, the Greens backed Dan Roy and the Rhinoceros Party backed Dale Alkerton

Dalhousie Ward
Candidate	Votes	%
Michael Janigan	2,582	49.07
Peter Harris	2,411	45.82
Dan Roy	227	4.31
Dale Alkerton	45	0.80

== Ottawa Board of Education Trustees ==
Zone 1 (Vanier, Rockcliffe Park, By-Rideau, St. George's, Overbrook-Forbes) 3 to be elected (79% of polls reporting)	Vote	%
Jane Dobell (X)	3,627	
Harriet Lang (X)	2,577	
Cynthia Bled	2,077	
Margaret Pazdzior	1,561	
John Stopa	1,268	
Gary Hough	1,230	
Salah Al Zein	836	

Zone 2 (Capital, Wellington) 2 to be elected (94% of polls reporting)	Vote	%
Anne Scotton	3,144	
Brian McGarry (X)	2,514	
Ruth Coodin	2,064	
Don Francis	1,707	
Les Jones	1,459	
Cecile Smithers	386	
Idris Ben-Tahir	261	

Zone 3 (Dalhousie, Riverside, Elmdale) 4 to be elected (98% of polls reporting)	Vote	%
Marian Lothian (X)	5,282	
Ted Best (X)	4,185	
Elda Allen	4,038	
Mary Lou Fleming	3,277	
Helen Campbell	3,060	
William Pugsley	2,753	
Dan Berg	2,493	

Zone 4 (Britannia, Richmond) 2 to be elected (95% of polls reporting)	Vote	%
Bill Gowling (X)	3,919	
Margaret Lange	3,771	
Robert Beatty (X)	2,409	
Wayne Wilson	2,029	
Irma Cohen	1,700	
Terry Orchard	831	
Robert Morrissette	731	

Zone 5 (Carleton, Queensboro) 3 to be elected (96% of polls reporting)	Vote	%
Kathryn Yach (X)	3,891	
Brian Mackey	3,472	
Linda Hunter	2,629	
John Wright	2,101	
Margaret Bristow	1,468	
Geoff Brown	1,460	
Kevin Kinsella	1,302	

Zone 6 (Alta Vista, Billings, Canterbury) 4 to be elected (95% of polls reporting)	Vote	%
Russ Jackson (X)	5,373	
Marjorie Loughrey (X)	5,273	
John Sutherland	4,393	
Roy Bushfield	3,905	
Rosalind Labow	2,896	
Linda Townsend	2,831	
Sue Mack	2,412	
David Gibbons	2,041	
Gordon Campbell	1,625	
Jeannine Ladouceur	990	
Donald Holmes	827	
