= Bay Ward =

Political ward in Ottawa, Ontario, Canada

Bay
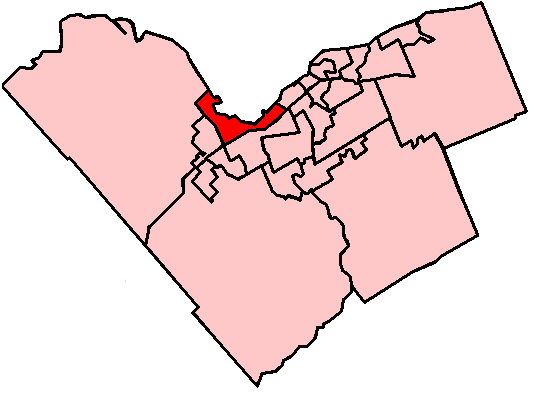
- Location within Ottawa
- Coordinates: 45°21′N 75°50′W
- Country: Canada
- Province: Ontario
- City: Ottawa

Government
  - Councillor: Theresa Kavanagh

Area
  - Total: 64.2 km^{2} (24.8 sq mi)

Population (2016)
  - Total: 42,890
  - Density: 668/km^{2} (1,730/sq mi)

Languages (2016)
  - English: 64.4%
  - French: 9.4%
  - Arabic: 4.0%
  - Somali: 1.6%
  - Mandarin: 1.5%
  - Tagalog: 1.4%
  - Persian: 1.3%
  - Spanish: 1.2%
  - Russian: 1.1%
- Avg. income: $38,201

Bay Ward or Ward 7 (French: Quartier Baie) is a municipal ward in Ottawa, Ontario, Canada represented on Ottawa City Council. It covers much of the western portion of the old city of Ottawa as well as some portions of what was once Nepean. The ward runs from Sherbourne and Maitland in the east to March Road in the west. The southern border is the Queensway while the northern border is the Ottawa River. The ward makes up the northern portion of the federal and provincial riding of Ottawa West—Nepean.

The ward contains a number of neighbourhoods, with quite diverse populations. Some of the neighbourhoods in the ward are Bayshore, Woodroffe North, Michele Heights, Glabar Park, Lincoln Heights, Britannia, and Crystal Beach. The westernmost part of the ward also contains a large section of the Greenbelt. Some of these neighbourhoods, especially those by the Ottawa River are quite wealthy. However, there are also many much poorer parts of the ward with many residents living in high-density apartments. The ward also contains some of Ottawa's highest concentrations of recent immigrants.

From the creation of the new city of Ottawa in 2001 to 2010 the ward was represented by former MPP Alex Cullen, who was considered to be one of the most left-wing members of city council. However, Bay Ward has voted Liberal in recent provincial elections and Conservative federally. In the 2003 and 2006 elections, Cullen faced strong challenges from conservative opponents. In the 2003 election he faced John Blatherwick, while in 2006 he fended off a challenge from high-profile former mayoral candidate Terry Kilrea. In 2010, Cullen was defeated by a Liberal, Mark Taylor.

Bay Ward was the home of former mayor Bob Chiarelli, and he won the area by large margins in both the 2000 and 2003 mayoral elections. In the 2006 mayoral election, however, the area supported Larry O'Brien and Chiarelli finished third, also behind Alex Munter. In the 2010 mayoral election, Bay Ward swung back to the centre, going for Jim Watson.

The ward is a descendant of Britannia-Richmond Ward, which included the area now in Bay Ward before Ottawa amalgamated in 2001. That ward was created in 1994 as Ward 1 when Britannia Ward merged with Richmond Ward and given the Britannia-Richmond name in 1995. The ward existed on Regional Council as Ward 7 from 1994 until the region dissolved, and was named Bay Ward in 1997. This area was part of Carleton Ward until 1972 when it became Britannia Ward. Richmond Ward was carved out of it in 1980 and existed until merging back with the original ward in 1994.

Following the 2020 Ottawa Ward boundary review, the ward will gain the neighbourhoods of McKellar Heights and McKellar Park.

There are at least Two Major Transit Stations in the Bay Ward. The First is Lincoln Fields Station, by the Kichi Zibi Mikan Parkway. The second is Bayshore Station, On Woodridge Crescent, by Bayshore Mall. Currently, both stations are expected to have a O-Train station for Lines 1 and 3 within a few years.

== City councillors ==
1. Marion Dewar (1973–1974), Britannia
2. Sandy Boyce (1975–1976), Britannia
3. Marlene Catterall (1977–1985), Britannia
4. Ruth Wildgen (1986–1988), Britannia
5. Jim Jones (1989–1991), Britannia
6. Jill Brown (1992–1994), Britannia
7. Ron Kolbus (1995–2000), Britannia-Richmond
8. Alex Cullen (2001–2010), Bay
9. Mark Taylor (2010–2018), Bay
10. Theresa Kavanagh (2018–present), Bay

== Election results ==
=== 1972 ===
Britannia Ward
| Candidate | Votes | % |
|---|---|---|
| Marion Dewar | 1,367 | 27.57 |
| Sandy Boyce | 862 | 17.39 |
| Brian McNally | 714 | 14.40 |
| Mike McMullen | 566 | 11.42 |
| Ken Creppin | 452 | 9.12 |
| Charles Strang | 384 | 7.75 |
| Suzanne Saunders | 199 | 4.01 |
| Richard MacDonald | 198 | 3.99 |
| Gerald Cammy | 197 | 3.97 |
| Gary Hugh | 19 | 0.38 |

=== 1974 ===
Britannia Ward
| Candidate | Votes | % |
|---|---|---|
| Sandy Boyce | 2,412 | 41.18 |
| Diane Birch | 2,203 | 37.61 |
| Maurice Royer | 706 | 12.05 |
| Anthony Gray | 536 | 9.15 |

=== 1976 ===
Britannia Ward
| Candidate | Votes | % |
|---|---|---|
| Marlene Catterall | 3,041 | 52.15 |
| Sandy Boyce | 2,790 | 47.85 |

=== 1978 ===
Britannia Ward
| Candidate | Votes | % |
|---|---|---|
| Marlene Catterall | 5,418 | 60.08 |
| Sandy Boyce | 3,600 | 39.92 |

=== 1980 ===
Britannia Ward
| Candidate | Votes | % |
|---|---|---|
| Marlene Catterall | 3,354 | 80.11 |
| Paul MacKay | 833 | 19.89 |

=== 1982 ===
Britannia Ward
| Candidate | Votes | % |
|---|---|---|
| Marlene Catterall | 2,840 | 49.80 |
| Paul MacKay | 1,487 | 26.07 |
| Terry O'Neill | 1,376 | 24.13 |

=== 1985 ===
Britannia Ward
| Candidate | Votes | % |
|---|---|---|
| Ruth Wildgen | 1,310 | 24.45 |
| Jim Jones | 1,263 | 23.57 |
| Greg Ross | 1,083 | 20.21 |
| Sandra Presley | 972 | 18.14 |
| Bud Downing | 350 | 6.53 |
| Kurt Orlik | 204 | 3.81 |
| Donald Holmes | 176 | 3.28 |

=== 1988 ===
Britannia Ward
| Candidate | Votes | % |
|---|---|---|
| Jim Jones | 1,940 | 40.80 |
| Ruth Wildgen | 1,928 | 40.55 |
| Geoffrey Sharpe | 496 | 10.43 |
| Jenny Lee Lapointe | 391 | 8.22 |

=== 1991 ===
Britannia Ward
| Candidate | Votes | % |
|---|---|---|
| Jill Brown | 1,859 | 33.13 |
| Gregory Ross | 1,558 | 27.77 |
| Geoffrey Sharpe | 831 | 14.81 |
| Jim Jones | 665 | 11.85 |
| Clarence S. Dungey | 273 | 4.87 |
| Randy McCooey | 214 | 3.81 |
| Andy Sammon | 211 | 3.76 |

=== 1994 ===
Regional council: Ward 7
| Candidate | Votes | % |
|---|---|---|
| Alex Cullen | 8,009 | 64.58 |
| Betty-Ann Kealey | 3,355 | 27.05 |
| Andy Sammon | 1,037 | 8.36 |

City council: Ward 1
| Candidate | Votes | % |
|---|---|---|
| Ron Kolbus | 4,756 | 46.13 |
| Gregory L. Ross | 4,030 | 39.09 |
| Richard Kuzell | 1523 | 14.77 |

=== 1997 ===
Regional council: Bay Ward
| Candidate | Votes | % |
|---|---|---|
| Wendy Byrne | 3,199 | 29.43 |
| Peter Harris | 3,017 | 27.75 |
| Frank Dalton | 2,041 | 18.77 |
| David Morrow | 1,871 | 17.21 |
| Victoria Manson | 595 | 5.47 |
| Douglas Besharah | 148 | 1.36 |

City council: Britannia-Richmond Ward
| Candidate | Votes | % |
|---|---|---|
| Ron Kolbus | 6,506 | 75.93 |
| Jim Jones | 1,639 | 19.13 |
| Alphonse Lapointe | 423 | 4.94 |

=== 2000 ===
City council
| Candidate | Votes | % |
|---|---|---|
| Alex Cullen | 7,191 | 48.02 |
| Doug Shouldice | 6,262 | 41.82 |
| Jim Jones | 572 | 3.82 |
| Jeff Seeton | 550 | 3.67 |
| Geoffrey Sharpe | 399 | 2.66 |

=== 2003 ===
City council
| Candidate | Votes | % |
|---|---|---|
| Alex Cullen | 6,713 | 56.74 |
| John Blatherwick | 4,477 | 37.84 |
| Don Rivington | 394 | 3.33 |
| Didar Mohamed | 248 | 2.10 |

=== 2006 ===
City council
| Candidate | Votes | % |
|---|---|---|
| Alex Cullen | 8,393 | 52.69 |
| Terry Kilrea | 6,303 | 39.57 |
| Sherril Noble | 1,234 | 7.75 |

=== 2010 ===
City council
| Candidate | Votes | % |
|---|---|---|
| Mark Taylor | 5,394 | 37.78 |
| Alex Cullen | 4,323 | 30.28 |
| George Guirguis | 1,789 | 12.53 |
| Terry Kilrea | 1,164 | 8.15 |
| Shawn Little | 903 | 6.32 |
| Oni Joseph | 544 | 3.81 |
| Peter Heyck | 99 | 0.69 |
| Erik Olesen | 61 | 0.43 |

=== 2014 ===
City council
| Candidate | Vote | % |
|---|---|---|
| Mark Taylor | 5,750 | 46.75 |
| Alex Cullen | 5,276 | 42.89 |
| George Guirguis | 498 | 4.05 |
| Trevor Robinson | 482 | 3.92 |
| Michael Pastien | 151 | 1.23 |
| Brendan Mertens | 143 | 1.16 |

Ottawa mayor (Ward results)
| Candidate | Vote | % |
|---|---|---|
| Jim Watson | 9,140 | 76.31 |
| Mike Maguire | 2,205 | 18.41 |
| Anwar Syed | 190 | 1.59 |
| Rebecca Pyrah | 141 | 1.18 |
| Robert White | 95 | 0.79 |
| Darren W. Wood | 78 | 0.65 |
| Bernard Couchman | 73 | 0.61 |
| Michael St. Arnaud | 55 | 0.46 |

=== 2018 ===
| Council candidate | Vote | % |
|---|---|---|
| Theresa Kavanagh | 6,509 | 55.17 |
| Don Dransfield | 2,104 | 17.83 |
| Erica Dath | 1,793 | 15.20 |
| Marc Lugert | 851 | 7.21 |
| Trevor Robinson | 541 | 4.59 |

=== 2022 ===
| Council candidate | Vote | % |
|---|---|---|
| Theresa Kavanagh | 12,398 | 82.79 |
| Robert Hill | 1,659 | 11.08 |
| Othman Alhusain | 919 | 6.14 |

=== 2026 ===
2026 Ottawa municipal election: Bay
| Candidate | Popular vote | | | Expenditures |
| Candidate | Votes | % | ±% | Expenditures |
|---|---|---|---|---|
| Theresa Kavanagh (X) | 11,939 | 82.47 | | |
| Spencer Radford | 1,443 | 9.97 | | |
| Butch Moore | 1,095 | 7.56 | | |
| Total valid votes | 14,950 | | | |
| Total rejected, unmarked and declined votes | | | | |
| Turnout | | 38.20 | | |
| Eligible voters | 31,140 | | | |
Note: Candidate campaign colours are based on the prominent colour used in campaign items (signs, literature, etc.) and are used as a visual differentiation between candidates.
