= Foster Farms (disambiguation) =

Foster Farms is a poultry company based in Livingston, California.

Foster Farms may also refer to:

- Crystal Creamery, based in Modesto, California, formerly known as Foster Farms Dairy
- Foster Farms Bowl, a post-season college football bowl game sponsored by the Foster Farms poultry company

== See also ==
- Foster Farm, a neighbourhood in Ottawa
