= Bayshore, Ottawa =

Bayshore
- Neighbourhood
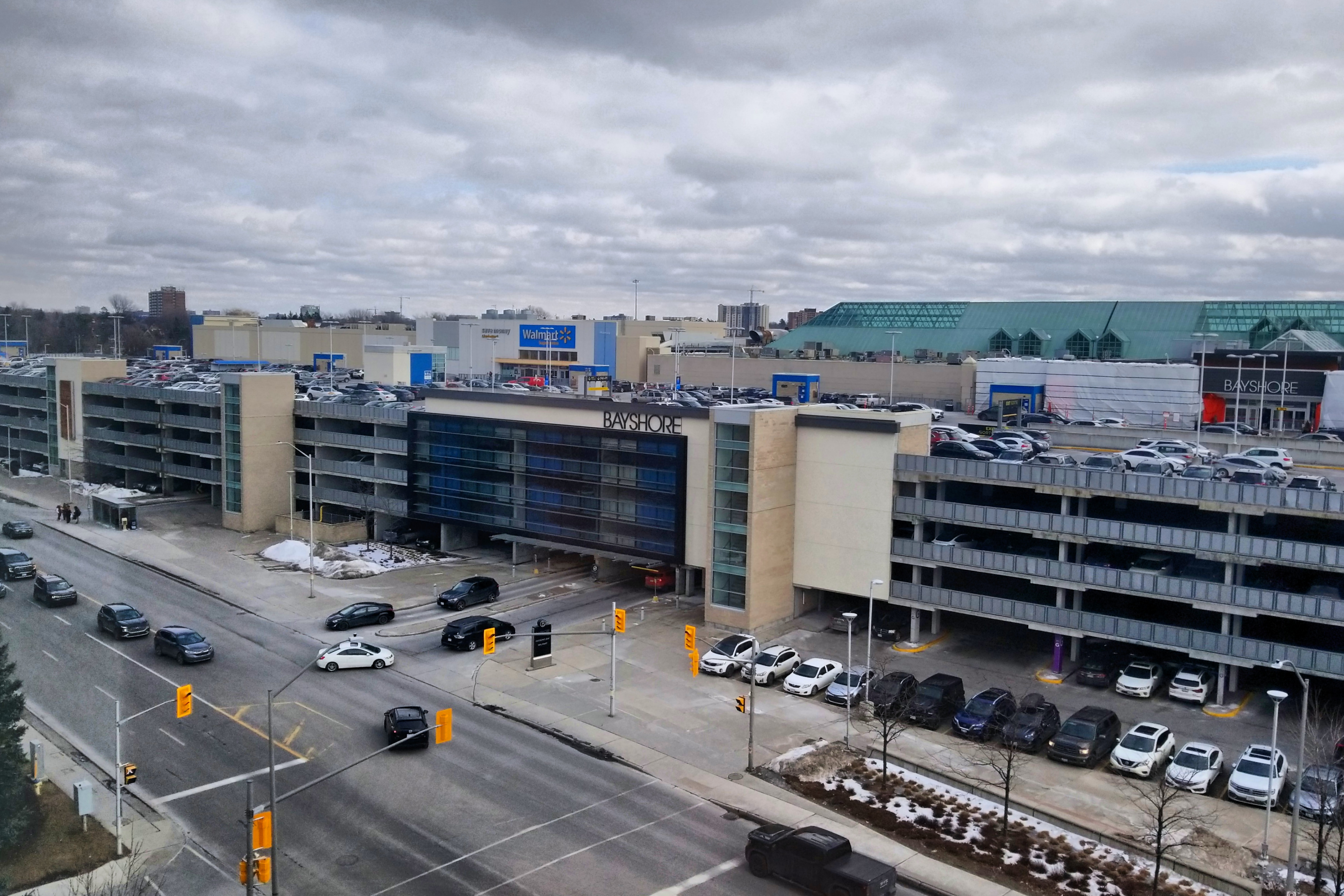
- Bayshore Shopping Centre

- Location in Ottawa
- Coordinates: 45°20′55″N 75°48′30″W
- Country: Canada
- Province: Ontario
- City: Ottawa
- City Ward: Bay

Government
  - Mayor: Mark Sutcliffe
  - MPs: Anita Vandenbeld
  - MPPs: Chandra Pasma
  - Councillors: Theresa Kavanagh

Area
  - Total: 0.71 km^{2} (0.27 sq mi)
- Elevation: 65 m (213 ft)

Population (2016)
  - Total: 5,585
  - Density: 7,900/km^{2} (20,000/sq mi)
- Canada 2016 Census
- Time zone: UTC−5 (Eastern (EST))
  - Summer (DST): UTC−4 (EDT)
- Website: Bayshore Community Association (Offline)

Bayshore (also known as Accora Village) is a neighbourhood in Bay Ward in the west end of Ottawa, Ontario, Canada. Prior to amalgamation in 2001, the neighbourhood was in the City of Nepean. It is bounded east by row houses off Bayshore Drive, to the north Carling Avenue, to the west Holly Acres Drive and the Lakeview neighbourhood, and to the south Ontario Highway 417. The main street in Bayshore is Woodridge Crescent, while the Bayshore Station is the major bus transit station.

According to the Canada 2016 Census, the neighbourhood had a population of 5,585. The neighbourhood is characterized by rental communities. The homes are townhouses (row houses), garden homes and high-rise apartment buildings.

Most of the population in the community features different ethnic groups. Most immigrants are from the Philippines (330), Iraq (315), and Afghanistan (205). The neighbourhood has a large Muslim population. The 2011 National Household Survey reported that 34% of the people in Bayshore's Census Tract were Muslim.

== History ==
The community was first built in 1963 and more were built during the 1960s. The developer was the Minto Group which is a significant developer of rental and non-rental communities in Ottawa. In the 1970s more townhouses and high-rises were built. In the early 2000s, the community changed ownership to Ferguslea Properties Inc, which is owned by Dan Greenberg. In 2011, Ferguslea announced that they would manage Accora Village, and all staff became employees of Ferguslea.

The main attraction is the Bayshore Shopping Centre which was built in 1973 and had two floors extended in 1987. Bayshore underwent a $270 million renovation, that included a new parking garage, updates to the mall, and the addition of several stores such as H&M, Victoria's Secret and Zara. Target was supposed to open a location in the mall, but plans were cancelled when Target pulled out of the country in 2015. This space is now occupied by Walmart.

In 2011, Ferguslea Properties Ltd, the owner of 2,465 units in the area, announced their plan to invest $40 million into the community. They also announced the community would be renamed Accora Village.

== Accora Village ==
Accora Village is home to 2,465 units, with approximately 7,000 residents. The community features 10 high-rise apartment buildings, and a range of townhomes and garden homes. Accora Village also offers its residents a recreation centre, named the Accora Centre. The Accora Centre holds an indoor pool, a gymnasium, a weight room, a lounge, and party rooms. The community is undergoing renovations to revamp the buildings. Its first apartment building to undergo complete renovations is Cobalt, located at 90 Woodridge Crescent.

Accora Village was the 2013 recipient of the Crime-Free Multi-Housing Program's Rental Owner of the Year award, for its commitment to ensuring safety and security in the community.

== Education ==
Within the bounds of the community there are two elementary schools. Bayshore Public School is an English Public elementary school providing Grade JK-6. The school's programs include a Regular English Program and an English as a Second Language program. Parent resources are available in Arabic, Chinese Simplified, Chinese Traditional, Persian, Polish, Punjabi and Urdu.

St. Rose of Lima School (formerly Bayshore Catholic School) is a somewhat smaller English Catholic elementary school providing Grade JK-6 The school's programs include English, and French Immersion programs.

== Recreation ==
For recreation, there is the Bayshore Community Centre, with an indoor gym and an indoor swimming pool. Bayshore Park features a baseball diamond and a few soccer fields. There is a National Capital Commission (NCC) bike path that goes along the western border of the neighborhood. The bike path goes to Kanata in the west and central Ottawa to the east.

In late 2013, Ferguslea Properties, the Senators Foundation, and the City of Ottawa announced their commitment to build the next rink of dreams, to be located in the middle of Accora Village, in Bayshore Park.

== Entertainment ==
There is a movie theater owned by Cineplex Entertainment called "Cineplex Cinemas", previously called "the Coliseum" on Carling Avenue just outside the neighborhood. In that location there was once a drive-in movie theater and a 6-plex movie theatre called Britannia 6. In 1998 they were both demolished to make way for the Coliseum.
