= Mark Taylor (Canadian politician) =

Canadian politician

Deputy Mayor of Ottawa Serving with Bob Monette
- In office December 2014 – December 1, 2018
- Preceded by: Steve Desroches, Eli El-Chantiry
- Succeeded by: George Darouze, Laura Dudas and Matthew Luloff

Ottawa City Councillor
- In office December 1, 2010 – December 1, 2018
- Preceded by: Alex Cullen
- Succeeded by: Theresa Kavanagh
- Constituency: Bay Ward

Personal details
- Born: Mark Taylor; November 1970 (age 55)
- Party: Liberal
- Profession: Politician

Mark Taylor (born November 1970) is a former Ottawa City Councillor representing Bay Ward. He defeated incumbent Alex Cullen in the 2010 Ottawa municipal election.

Taylor ran again for City Council in 2014 and was returned to office as Bay Ward Councillor. He was appointed by Council one of the city of Ottawa's two Deputy Mayors for the 2014–2018 term of council.

Taylor grew up in the Queensway Terrace North neighbourhood and attended Severn Avenue Public School, Pinecrest Intermediate School and Woodroffe High School. He attended Carleton University to study History and Anthropology but did not complete his degree.

In 1998, Taylor became a retail manager at Time Cellular, a Rogers AT&T dealership. He later became a co-owner and chief information officer of the company.

Taylor's past political experience involved working as the executive assistant to Liberal Member of Provincial Parliament and Cabinet Minister Jim Watson, who was elected mayor in 2010.

Mark Taylor is one of ten new councillors elected in the 2010 Ottawa Municipal Elections. He won 38% of the vote in a field of eight candidates for Bay ward councillor.

From 2010 to 2014 Taylor was the chairman of the Community and Protective Services Committee, which is responsible for parks and recreation, fire and paramedic services and community and social services. He was a member of the Planning Committee, the Finance and Economic Development Committee and the Information Technology Sub-committee.

In the 2014–2018 term of Ottawa City Council Taylor was selected as one of the city's two deputy mayors. His areas of policy responsibility are Housing and Homelessness, Older Adult / Seniors issues, Economic Development and Innovation. Taylor also serves as a member of the board of Ottawa Public Health, a board member of the Ottawa Community Housing Corporation, a member of the Environment Committee, and a member of the Finance and Economic Development Committee.

In addition to working within city government, Taylor has contributed to several arms-length organizations, including:

- a contributor to the Institute of Research for Public Policy on Seniors issues
- a member of the board of directors of the United Way of Ottawa
- a member of the board of directors of the Association of Municipalities of Ontario
- a member of the Association of Municipalities of Ontario Task Force on Affordable Housing
