= McKellar Park =

Neighbourhood in Ottawa, Canada

- Neighbourhood
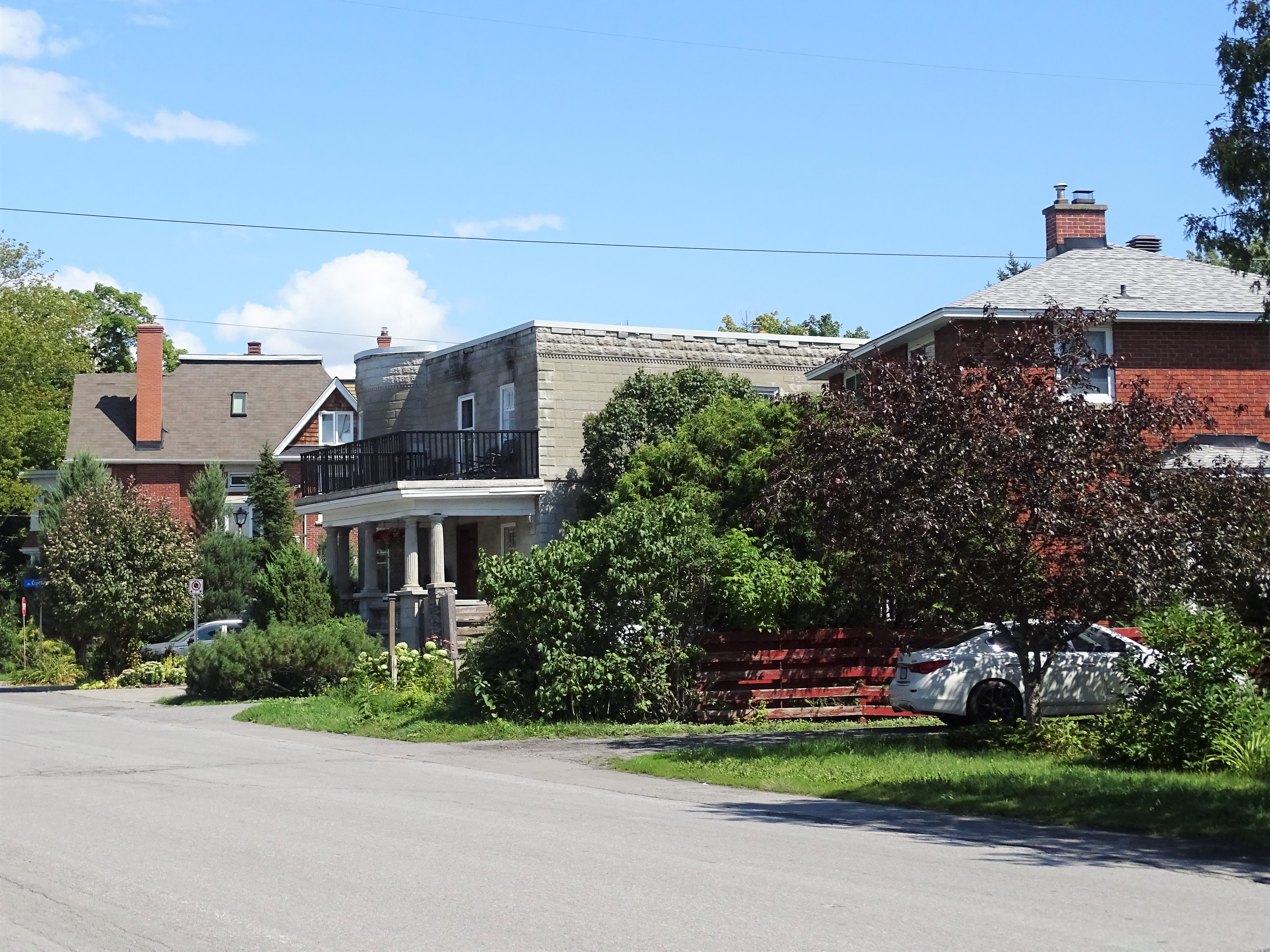
- Byron Avenue
- Interactive map of McKellar Park
- Coordinates: 45.3830°N 75.7656°W
- Country: Canada
- Province: Ontario
- City: Ottawa

Government
  - MPs: Yasir Naqvi
  - MPPs: Catherine McKenney
  - Councillors: Theresa Kavanagh

Area
  - Total: 4.2 km^{2} (1.6 sq mi)

Population (2011)
  - Total: 2,800
- Canada 2011 Census
- Time zone: UTC-5 (Eastern (EST))

McKellar Park (also known as just McKellar) is a neighbourhood located in Bay Ward in the west end of Ottawa, Ontario, Canada. It is sometimes considered to be part of the greater Westboro area. It is bounded on the east by Denbury Avenue, on the south and west by Sherbourne Avenue and on the north by the Ottawa River. The neighborhood of Highland Park is directly to its east. It is considered a trendy and expensive area, being close to the Westboro Village.

The population is roughly 2800 people (2011 census).
