= Qualicum-Graham Park =

Suburban neighbourhood in College Ward in Ottawa, Ontario, Canada

Coordinates: 45.33893°N 75.80077°W

Qualicum-Graham Park or Qualicum is a suburban neighbourhood in College Ward in the City of Ottawa, Ontario, Canada. It is located in the former City of Nepean in the west end of the city. Many of the residences in the area are executive homes situated on large lots (100x100) being built in the 1960s. Qualicum Street boasts large custom houses built by Bill Teron. The neighbourhood is bounded to the north by the Queensway, to the west by Richmond Road, to the south by Baseline Road, and to the east by Morrison Drive at the former Ottawa-Nepean border towards Redwood. Named after Qualicum Beach in British Columbia.

According to the Canada 2011 Census, the total population of the neighbourhood was 1,715.

Most of the streets are named after Aboriginal peoples and towns in British Columbia. The following streets are located in the community:

- Aleutian Road- named after the Aleutian Islands in Alaska.
- Chinook Crescent- the Chinook winds in the Canadian Prairies.
- Cowichan Way- named after the Cowichan peoples in BC.
- Esquimalt Avenue- a town on Vancouver Island. One of the main streets in the neighborhood; starts at Beaumaris and ends at Okanagan
- Kitimat Crescent-Town in northwestern British Columbia
- Kitsilano Court- Named after a suburb in Vancouver, British Columbia. Located at the former Graham Park Public School grounds in Qualicum-Graham Park. Built in 2015.
- Mohawk Crescent- Named after the Mohawk people. The tribe is located in the St. Lawrence Region; Southern Quebec, Eastern Ontario, and Northern New York.
- Nanaimo Drive-A town in Vancouver Island. Another main street in the neighbourhood.
- Okanagan Drive- Named after the Okanagan Valley around the Rocky Mountains in BC. Starts at Nanaimo Drive, which curves and ends at Baseline Road.
- Qualicum Street- Named after Qualicum Beach on Vancouver Island. Qualicum street is parallel along Baseline Road. Starts at Draper Avenue and ends at Esquimalt Avenue.
- Sioux Crescent- Named after the Sioux in the Northern United States(Minnesota, Dakotas, Iowa and Montana) and the Prairies in Central Canada (Alberta, Manitoba and Saskatchewan).

== History ==
The neighbourhood was originally woods and farms. Before development, the area was referred to as Graham Bay or Graham Bay Station. At the southwest tip of Qualicum, the Bruce family owned the farm until the community's development in 1961. Today the farm is Bruce Farm Park. The community was built in the 1960s. Originally, the area was divided into four sub-neighbourhoods, Bruce Farm, Qualicum Park, Graham Park and Bellands.

== Features ==
Main streets in the neighbourhood are Queensline and Beaumaris.

Graham Creek meanders through the neighbourhood. Starts at the Bruce Pit Quarry near Trend-Arlington and ends at Andrew Hayden Park at the Ottawa River.

For schools there is Our Lady of Peace Catholic School in Bells Corners, Leslie Park (now closed), Grant Alternative (formerly Christie Public School) (now closed), Knoxdale Public School and Greenbank Middle School (now closed). For high schools there is St. Paul's (formerly Sir John A. MacDonald High School), Franco Ouest, Sir Robert Borden and Bell High School (Ottawa). Ecole Maimonides School (formerly Graham Park Public School) was private French school, Maimondies was formerly Graham Park Public School. Graham Park operated from 1964 until 1988 due to a decline in population. It closed and the school was demolished in June 2011. In 2015, Kitsilano Court was built with newly developed homes on the former school grounds.

A small community centre is located at Nanimo Park built in 2012.

The community is close to many attractions and amenities. It is home to the Queensway Carleton Hospital which opened in 1976; was originally part of the Bruce farmland. It is very close to Bayshore Shopping Centre and Pinecrest Shopping Mall.

Parks in the neighbourhood include Mohawk, Okanagan, Qualicum, Valley Stream, and Nanamio/Graham Park. The Valley Stream Park is home to the Valley Stream Tennis Club. In 2010 a community centre was built in Graham Park which host the Qualicum-Graham Park Community Association monthly meetings.
