= Alex Cullen (politician) =

Canadian politician

Ottawa City Councillor
- In office 2000–2010
- Preceded by: Ron Kolbus
- Succeeded by: Mark Taylor
- Constituency: Bay Ward

Member of Provincial Parliament
- In office 1997–1999
- Preceded by: Bob Chiarelli
- Succeeded by: Gary Guzzo
- Constituency: Ottawa West

Ottawa-Carleton Regional Councillor
- In office 1991–1997
- Preceded by: Jacquelin Holzman
- Succeeded by: Wendy Byrne
- Constituency: Richmond Ward, then Bay Ward

Ottawa City Councillor
- In office 1991–1994
- Preceded by: Jacquelin Holzman
- Succeeded by: Ron Kolbus
- Constituency: Richmond Ward

Ottawa Board of Education Trustee
- In office November 8, 1982 – November 14, 1988
- Preceded by: Wayne Wilson, John Jackson, John Wright
- Succeeded by: Kathy Yach, Brian Mackey, Linda Hunter

Personal details
- Party: New Democrat (1998–present)
- Other political affiliations: Liberal (before 1998)
- Spouse: Theresa Kavanagh
- Children: 3
- Education: York University
- Occupation: Economist

Alexander Shaun Cullen is a politician in Ontario, Canada. He is a former member of Provincial Parliament (MPP) in the Legislative Assembly of Ontario and a former member of Ottawa City Council, representing the Bay Ward in Ottawa's west end. He retired in 2016 and went on to serve as president of the Federation of Citizens Associations (FCA) in Ottawa (2021–22).

== Background ==
Cullen was born in Montreal, Quebec, to a Dutch mother and an Irish father (Henry Cullen) who was a sea captain-turned successful businessman in Montreal.

Cullen attended Lower Canada College in Montreal before moving to Ottawa to attend Carleton University. There, he was the president of the Carleton University Student Liberals. He served on the Carleton University Students Association as Arts Representative and later as vice-president of CUSA. However, he did not finish his studies at Carleton. He worked at Fat Albert's in Ottawa (a sub shop) before moving to Toronto, where he became a bank teller and savings supervisor. He then went to York University in Toronto, where he obtained both a bachelor's degree (honours) and a master's degree in economics. He also became a member of Mensa.

Cullen later returned to Ottawa to join the economics consulting firm Informetrica as an economist, then moving to the federal Department of Health and Welfare as a policy analyst. There he joined the Economists', Statisticians' & Sociologists' Association (ESSA, a federal public service union), where he rose to vice-president. He left the federal public service in 1991 upon election to Ottawa City Council.

== Personal life ==
Cullen is married to his third wife, Ottawa City Councillor Theresa Kavanagh. He has two sons and a daughter from his previous marriages.

A long-time cross-country skier, Cullen has participated in the Gatineau (formerly the Keskinada) Loppet and the Canadian Ski Marathon many times (achieving bronze, silver and gold Courier de bois in the CSM). In 2006, he began running marathons (including Ottawa, Toronto, Chicago and New York), and began participating in triathlons. In 2008, 2010 and 2011, Cullen was awarded the Rudy Award for completing the Winter Triathlon, the Keskinada Loppet (53 km), the Ottawa Marathon, the Rideau Lakes Cycle Tour (biking 180 km from Ottawa to Kingston and back), and an iron distance triathlon (3.8 km swimming, 180 km cycling, 42.2 km running).

In 2011, he was named Francophile of the Year by ACFO (Ottawa), and in 2013 was awarded the Queen's Diamond Jubilee medal for his contribution to public service.

In 2023, he and his wife climbed Mount Kilimanjaro in Tanzania (Africa's highest mountain).

== Political career ==
=== Municipal politics, part I ===
In 1982, Cullen was elected school board trustee with the Ottawa Board of Education representing the Western Zone. In 1985, he was re-elected as a school board trustee representing Queensboro and Carleton Wards. During this time, he was also active in Kiwanis, serving as president of the Westboro Kiwanis Club in 1985-86.

In 1988, he ran for Ottawa City Council in the Richmond Ward but lost to incumbent Jacquelin Holzman. When Holzman vacated the seat to successfully run for mayor in the 1991 election, Cullen, then a community association president in the ward (Glabar Park Community Alliance), ran again and won the seat in a close three-way race.

As an Ottawa city councillor he also served jointly on the Council of the Regional Municipality of Ottawa-Carleton. In 1994 Cullen was elected as the first regional councillor for Bay Ward, when provincial legislation created a directly elected regional council.

=== Provincial politics, part I ===
In the 1985 provincial election, he ran as a Liberal candidate in the riding of Ottawa West but lost to Ontario Progressive Conservative Party incumbent Reuben Baetz, a cabinet minister, by about 3,000 votes. Cullen again sought the Liberal nomination to run in the Ottawa West riding in the 1987 election, but lost to local lawyer Bob Chiarelli. In 1996, Cullen supported Dalton McGuinty to lead the Ontario Liberal Party.

In 1997, Bob Chiarelli resigned from the legislature to run for chair of the Ottawa-Carleton Regional Municipality. In the subsequent Ottawa West by-election, Cullen ran for the Liberals and was easily elected as MPP. In May 1998, he gained national prominence as the only provincial legislator in the country to vote against the Calgary Declaration, as he opposed any document that did not recognize the paramountcy of the Charter of Rights.

This vote made him unpopular within the Liberal Party. In the run-up to the 1999 provincial election, Cullen was challenged for the Liberal nomination in the new riding of Ottawa West—Nepean by Rick Chiarelli, a Nepean city councillor. In September 1998, Cullen lost the nomination battle to Chiarelli. On October 20, 1998, Cullen was expelled from the Liberal caucus and sat as an independent MPP. He joined the New Democratic Party a few weeks later, and subsequently won the NDP nomination in the riding.

In the 1999 Ontario general election, Cullen ran in the newly configured riding of Ottawa West—Nepean, and placed third with 7,701 votes behind second place Chiarelli (16,419 votes). Progressive Conservative Garry Guzzo was elected with 22,834 votes.

=== Municipal politics, part II ===
In 1999 Cullen became executive director of the Council on Aging, a United Way agency and lobby group for seniors. He was elected to represent Bay Ward in the newly amalgamated City of Ottawa in 2000, and was re-elected in 2003 and 2006, defeating high-profile right-wing challenger Terry Kilrea. During his tenure, Cullen served as chair of the city's Transit Committee (responsible for public transit service in Ottawa), and on the Board of Directors of Ottawa Community Housing (the city's social housing agency) and Hydro Ottawa.

On January 4, 2010, Cullen filed his nomination to run for mayor in Ottawa's 2010 municipal election. On August 31, he dropped out of the race, citing low funds, the addition of another left wing candidate (Clive Doucet) and a desire to defeat Terry Kilrea in Bay Ward. On October 25, 2010, Cullen lost in his bid for re-election in Bay Ward to challenger Mark Taylor. Cullen cited his late entry into the race in Bay Ward as the reason for his loss.

=== Provincial politics, part II ===
In January 2013, Cullen sought the Ontario NDP nomination in the riding of Ottawa Centre for the 41st Ontario general election, but was defeated by Ottawa-Carleton District School Board Trustee Jennifer McKenzie. Cullen subsequently won the Ontario NDP nomination in the riding of Ottawa West—Nepean, but was defeated on June 12, 2014, by the Liberal candidate Bob Chiarelli.

=== Municipal politics, part III ===
In June 2014, Cullen registered to run in Bay Ward (his former municipal ward) in the City of Ottawa, against incumbent Mark Taylor. Cullen received media attention during the election upon the release of his report on the 2010 Ottawa municipal election finances (similar to previous reports Cullen had written following the 2003 and 2006 municipal elections), in which he made a case for banning corporate and union campaign contributions.

On October 27, 2014 (election day), Cullen lost to incumbent Mark Taylor in a closely fought campaign by 474 votes (Taylor: 5,750; Cullen 5,276; 4 other candidates 1,234).

== Electoral record ==
2014 Ottawa municipal election: Bay Ward
Candidate	Vote	%
Mark Taylor	5,750	46.75
Alex Cullen	5,276	42.89
George Guirguis	498	4.05
Trevor Robinson	482	3.92
Michael Pastien	151	1.23
Brendan Mertens	143	1.16

2014 Ontario general election: Ottawa West—Nepean
Party	Candidate	Votes	%	±%
Liberal	Bob Chiarelli	21,035	44.84	+3.23
Progressive Conservative	Randall Denley	15,895	33.89	–5.46
New Democratic	Alex Cullen	6,760	14.41	–0.39
Green	Alex Hill	2,899	6.18	+2.84
Libertarian	Matthew Brooks	318	0.68	–
Total valid votes		46,907	98.49	
Total rejected, unmarked and declined ballots		719	1.51	+1.12
Turnout		47,626	55.95	+1.93
Eligible voters		85,125		
Liberal hold		Swing		+4.34
Source: Elections Ontario

2010 Ottawa municipal election: Bay Ward
Candidate	Votes	%
Mark Taylor	5,394	37.78
Alex Cullen	4,323	30.28
George Guirguis	1,789	12.53
Terry Kilrea	1,164	8.15
Shawn Little	903	6.32
Oni Joseph	544	3.81
Peter Heyck	99	0.69
Erik Olesen	61	0.43

2006 Ottawa municipal election Bay Ward
Candidate	Votes	%
Alex Cullen	8,393	52.69
Terry Kilrea	6,303	39.57
Sherril Noble	1,234	7.75

2003 Ottawa municipal election: Bay Ward
Candidate	Votes	%
Alex Cullen	6,713	56.74
John Blatherwick	4,477	37.84
Don Rivington	394	3.33
Didar Mohamed	248	2.10

2000 Ottawa municipal election: Bay Ward
Candidate	Votes	%
Alex Cullen	7,191	48.02
Doug Shouldice	6,262	41.82
Jim Jones	572	3.82
Jeff Seeton	550	3.67
Geoffrey Sharpe	399	2.66

1999 Ontario general election: Ottawa West—Nepean
Party	Candidate	Votes	%	Expenditures
Progressive Conservative	Garry Guzzo	22,834	47.79	$52,524.00
Liberal	Rick Chiarelli	16,419	34.36	$69,057.01
New Democratic	Alex Cullen	7,701	16.12	$32,467.74
Green	Richard Warman	453	0.95	$0
Independent	Megan Hnatiw	129	0.27	$0
Independent	John Turmel	94	0.20	$0
Confederation of Regions	Anthony C. Silvestro	79	0.17	$806.00
Natural Law	Lester J. Newby	70	0.15	$0
Total valid votes/expense limit		47,779	99.18	$78,526.08
Total rejected, unmarked and declined ballots		393	0.82	
Turnout		48,172	58.89	
Eligible voters		81,798		
Progressive Conservative pickup new district.				
Source: Elections Ontario

Ontario provincial by-election, September 4, 1997: Ottawa West Resignation of Bob Chiarelli
Party	Candidate	Votes	%	±%
Liberal	Alex Cullen	11,438	52.90	+7.42
Progressive Conservative	Chris Thompson	7,217	33.38	-7.03
New Democratic	Katrina Prystupa	2,573	11.90	+0.26
Independent	John Turmel	201	0.93	
Green	Gene Villeneuve	193	0.89	-0.51
Total valid votes		21,622	99.26	+0.60
Total rejected, unmarked and declined ballots		162	0.74	-0.60
Turnout		21,784	47.67	-16.76
Eligible voters		45,701		
Liberal hold		Swing		

1994 Ottawa-Carleton Regional Municipality elections: Bay Ward
Candidate	Votes	%
Alex Cullen	8,009	64.58
Betty-Ann Kealey	3,355	27.05
Andy Sammon	1,037	8.36

1991 Ottawa municipal election: Richmond Ward
Candidate	Votes	%
Alex Cullen	3,268	37.91
Ron Kolbus	2,922	33.90
Daniel Stringer	2,430	28.19

1988 Ottawa municipal election: Richmond Ward
Candidate	Votes	%
Jacquelin Holzman (X)	4,380	52.04
Alex Cullen	2,391	28.41
Daniel Stringer	1,646	19.56

1985 Ottawa Board of Education trustee election Zone 5 (Carleton, Queensboro)	Vote	%
Alex Cullen (X)	3,222	23.96
Kathy Yach (X)	3,067	22.80
Brian Mackay	2,968	22.07
Beth Little	2,299	17.09
C. J. Kempffer	1,018	7.57
Kevin Kinsella	875	6.51

1985 Ontario general election: Ottawa West
Party	Candidate	Votes	%	±%
Progressive Conservative	Reuben Baetz	15,089	46.63	
Liberal	Alex Cullen	12,141	37.52	
New Democratic	Gregory Ross	4,427	13.68	
Green	Gregory Vezina	701	2.17	
Total valid votes		32,358	99.23	
Total rejected, unmarked and declined ballots		251	0.77	
Turnout		32,609	59.43	
Eligible voters		54,873		

1982 Ottawa Board of Education trustee election Western Zone	Vote
Bill Law (X)	13,733
Robert Beatty (X)	12,769
Sandra Goldstein (X)	10,903
Bill Gowling	10,817
Kathy Yach	9,058
Alex Cullen	8,595
Wayne Wilson (X)	7,527
John Jackson (X)	7,310
John Wright (X)	7,262
Abby Pollonetsky	7,221
Marion Lothian	6,377
Robert Grace	6,366
Harry Albright	5,381
Stephen Delaney	5,306
Barbara Mollon	4,455
Calvin Kempffer	3,041
Dale Alkerton	2,373
