= Ruth Wildgen =

Canadian politician and activist

Ottawa Alderman
- In office 1985–1988
- Preceded by: Marlene Catterall
- Succeeded by: Jim Jones
- Constituency: Britannia Ward

Personal details
- Born: 1921 Saskatchewan
- Died: September 11, 1999 Dunrobin, Ontario
- Spouse: Francis Wildgen (m. 1952–1999; estranged c. 1970)

Ruth Wildgen, née Besharah (1921 – September 11, 1999) was a Canadian politician and activist. She represented Britannia Ward on Ottawa City Council and the Ottawa-Carleton Regional Council from 1985 to 1988.

Wildgen was born in 1921 in Saskatchewan, the second of eight children of Lebanese immigrants. The family moved to Almonte, Ontario when she was three. Wildgen married her husband Francis in 1952, but would later be estranged from him. In 1974, two of her children were making candles in the basement when a fire erupted that led to her house at 1146 Merivale Road being burnt down, forcing her and her children into public housing.

Wildgen was the founder of the Foster Farm Soup Kitchen and the Foster Farm Food Co-operative. She was also one of the founding partners of At Your Service Restaurant, a training program for people having difficulty finding employment, Operation Break, a camp for disadvantaged families and the West End Legal Clinic. She was also the president of the Ottawa Council for Low Income Support Services and served on the board of the Ottawa-Carleton Regional Housing Authority.

Wildgen was elected to city council in the 1985 Ottawa municipal election defeating Jim Jones by just 47 votes. At the time of the election, she was area supervisor for the city's recreation and community development branch. She was also on the boards of the Social Planning Council of Ottawa-Carleton, the Ottawa Women's Credit Union and the Ottawa Distress Centre. She ran on a platform of a traffic study for a local intersection, more support services for seniors to stay in their homes, and implementing a 911 emergency number for the region.

While sitting on council, Wildgen represented the region on a provincial committee looking at social services. She usually voted with the left wing councillors. In the 1988 Ottawa municipal election, Wildgen lost in another close race against Jones, who was seen as being more "pro-development". After a recount, Jones defeated her by 10 votes. In her campaign, she supported a one-tier municipal government and keeping tax increases to a minimum.

Marlene Catterall nominated Wildgen for a Governor General's Award in commemoration of the Persons Case, for her work with social causes.

Wildgen died in her home in Dunrobin, Ontario on September 11, 1999.
