= 1997 Ottawa-Carleton Regional Municipality elections =

Election in Ontario, Canada

1997 Ottawa-Carleton Regional chair election
- November 10, 1997
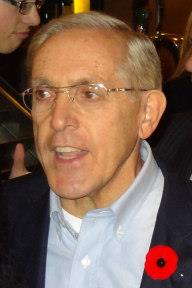
Nominee	Bob Chiarelli	Peter D. Clark
Popular vote	82,165	79,407
Percentage	49.54%	47.88%
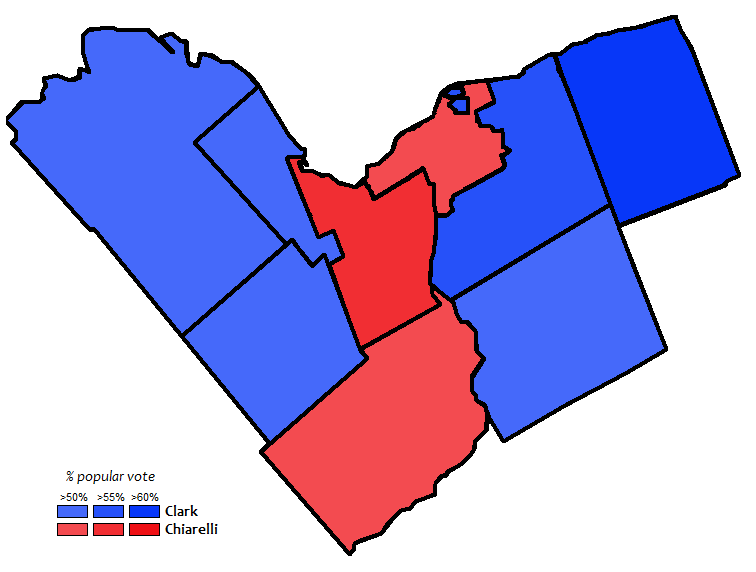
- Results by municipality
Chair before election
Peter D. Clark
Elected Chair
Bob Chiarelli

Elections were held on November 10, 1997, in the Regional Municipality of Ottawa-Carleton. This page lists the election results for Regional Chair, Regional Council, and local mayors and councils of the RMOC in 1997. The 1997 election was the last election for the regional government and the municipalities, as they were merged into the new city of Ottawa for the 2000 elections.

Ottawa West MPP Bob Chiarelli defeated incumbent Peter D. Clark for the chair of the region in a close race.

== Regional Chair of Ottawa-Carleton ==
1997 Ottawa-Carleton Regional Municipality elections: Regional Chair
Party	Candidate	Votes	%	±%
Independent	Bob Chiarelli	82,165	49.54	-
Independent	Peter Clark	79,407	47.88	-7.12
Independent	John Turmel	4,129	2.49	+0.14
Total valid votes		165,845		
Source:Official Results, City of Ottawa Archives

=== Results by municipality ===
Chiarelli only won three of the region's 11 municipalities, but won the two largest, Ottawa and Nepean.

Municipality	Chiarelli	Clark	Turmel
Cumberland	3,372	6,149	268
Gloucester	8,729	11,874	614
Goulbourn	3,122	3,380	142
Kanata	6,076	6,683	296
Nepean	16,460	12,153	492
Osgoode	2,453	2,753	156
Ottawa	36,200	29,911	1,726
Rideau	1,998	1,868	88
Rockcliffe Park	178	228	3
Vanier	1,295	1,882	202
West Carleton	2,282	2,526	141

=== Polls ===
Published Date(s)	Firm	Clark	Chiarelli	Turmel	Undecided	Source
Nov 3	EKOS	33	24	1	42	

== Regional Council ==
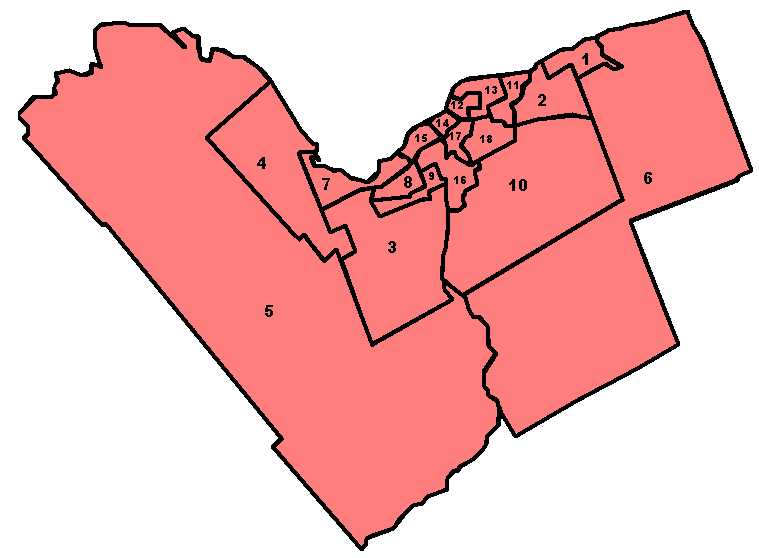
Map of the RMOC's Wards used in this election: 1. Orléans Ward; 2. Innes Ward; 3. Bell-South Nepean Ward; 4. Kanata Ward; 5. Western Townships Ward; 6. Cumberland-Osgoode Ward; 7. Bay Ward; 8. Baseline Ward; 9. Knoxdale-Merivale Ward; 10. Gloucester-Southgate Ward; 11. Beacon Hill-Cyrville Ward; 12. Rideau-Vanier Ward; 13. Rideau-Rockcliffe Ward; 14. Somerset Ward; 15. Kitchissippi Ward; 16. River Ward; 17. Capital Ward; 18. Alta Vista Ward.

Orléans Ward
Candidate	Votes	%
Herb Kreling (X)	3648	41.39
Keith De Cruz	2730	30.98
Pierre Cantin	2435	27.63

Innes Ward
Candidate	Votes	%
Richard Cantin (X)	3403	44.41
Ed Campbell	3154	41.16
Joyce Hum	597	7.79
Pierre Maheu	509	6.64

Bell-South Nepean Ward
Candidate	Votes	%
Molly McGoldrick-Larsen	8166	73.16
Brian Beckett	1831	16.40
Adam Hacker	1165	10.44

Kanata Ward
Candidate	Votes	%
Alex Munter (X)	ACCLAIMED	

Western Townships Ward
Candidate	Votes	%
Betty Hill (X)	ACCLAIMED	

Cumberland-Osgoode Ward
Candidate	Votes	%
Robert van den Ham (X)	4516	50.50
John Cyr	3386	37.87
John Geary	630	7.05
Daniel Bood	410	4.59

Bay Ward
Candidate	Votes	%
Wendy Byrne	3199	29.43
Peter Harris	3017	27.75
Frank Dalton	2041	18.77
David Morrow	1871	17.21
Victoria Manson	595	5.47
Douglas Besharah	148	1.36

Baseline Ward
Candidate	Votes	%
Al Loney (X)	6291	64.17
Mike Patton	3512	35.83

Knoxdale-Merivale Ward
Candidate	Votes	%
Gord Hunter (X)	ACCLAIMED	

Gloucester-Southgate Ward
Candidate	Votes	%
Dan Beamish (X)	5169	65.18
Joan O'Neill	2761	34.82

Beacon Hill-Cyrville Ward
Candidate	Votes	%
Michel Bellemare (X)	3727	56.87
Fiona Faucher	2827	43.13

Rideau-Vanier Ward
Candidate	Votes	%
Madeleine Meilleur (X)	5228	71.06
Alain Miguelez	1823	24.78
Jude Antonin	306	4.16

Rideau-Rockcliffe Ward
Candidate	Votes	%
Jacques Legendre (X)	4870	85.62
Efren Marquez	818	14.38

Somerset Ward
Candidate	Votes	%
Diane Holmes (X)	ACCLAIMED	

Kitchissippi Ward
Candidate	Votes	%
Linda Davis (X)	4440	49.84
Joan Wong	3779	42.42
Diana Brebner	690	7.74

River Ward
Candidate	Votes	%
Wendy Stewart (X)	6855	86.25
Daryl Martin	1093	13.75

Capital Ward
Candidate	Votes	%
Clive Doucet	2987	36.80
Jim Kennelly	2054	25.30
Robin Quinn	1573	19.38
Ed Barter	1002	12.34
David McNicoll	501	6.17

Alta Vista Ward
Candidate	Votes	%
Peter Hume (X)	6277	65.32
Patricia O'Reilly	2383	24.80
John Yarmo	657	6.84
John Wiebe	239	3.05

== Cumberland ==
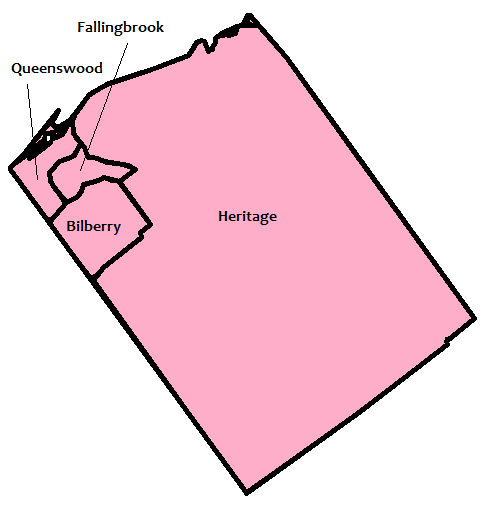
Map of Cumberland's wards used in this election

Mayoral race

Candidate	Vote	%
Brian Coburn (X)	ACCLAIMED	

Council

Candidate	Vote	%
Queenswood Ward
John Morgan	1835	54.48
Pat Armstrong	1533	45.52
Bilberry Ward
Dave Lewis (X)	1157	71.38
Brian Faktar	464	28.62
Fallingbrook Ward
Frank Dugal (X)	ACCLAIMED	
Heritage Ward
Gerry Lalonde (X)	1614	60.59
Bob Cox	1050	30.41

== Gloucester ==
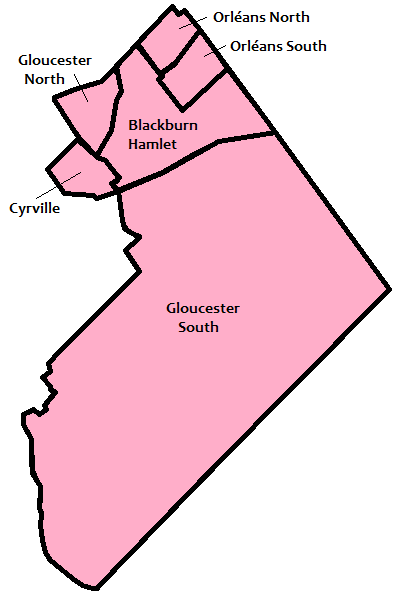
Map of Gloucester's wards used in this election

Mayoral race

Candidate	Vote	%
Claudette Cain (X)	19167	89.59
Scott Heffernan	1525	7.13
George Saadé	702	3.28

Council

Candidate	Vote	%
Gloucester North Ward
Michael Denny (X)	ACCLAIMED	
Cyrville Ward
Patricia Clark (X)	ACCLAIMED	
Blackburn Hamlet Ward
Rainer Bloess (X)	2431	83.31
Gary Burns	487	16.69
Orléans North Ward
René Danis (X)	ACCLAIMED	
Orléans South Ward
Ken Vowles	937	20.18
Marc Thibault	893	19.23
Martin Donley	724	15.59
Gary Jessup	530	11.42
Jacques Dufault	521	11.22
Kenneth Moreau	432	9.30
Jake Thomas	334	7.19
Marvin Mempin	307	6.34
Peter Larivière	272	5.86
Gloucester South Ward
George Barrett (X)	ACCLAIMED	

== Goulbourn ==
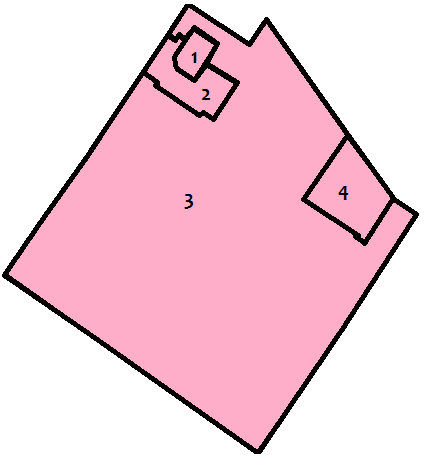
Map of Goulbourn's wards used in this election

Mayoral race

Candidate	Vote	%
Janet Stavinga	3583	52.85
Allan Ryan	3197	47.15

Council

Candidate	Vote	%
Ward 1
Mike Bryan	901	53.89
Linda Cronin	771	46.11
Ward 2
Louise Beggs	1411	68.53
Martha Cooper	648	31.47
Ward 3
Steven Lewis (X)	1241	83.79
Mark Labelle	240	16.21
Ward 4
Dwayne Barkley	322	26.39
Bryan Hetherington	315	25.82
Bernie McMiller	256	20.98
Paul Duplants	230	18.85
Marc Poirier	97	7.95

== Kanata ==
Mayoral race

Candidate	Vote	%
Merle Nicholds (X)	10718	80.69
John Harkness	2565	19.31

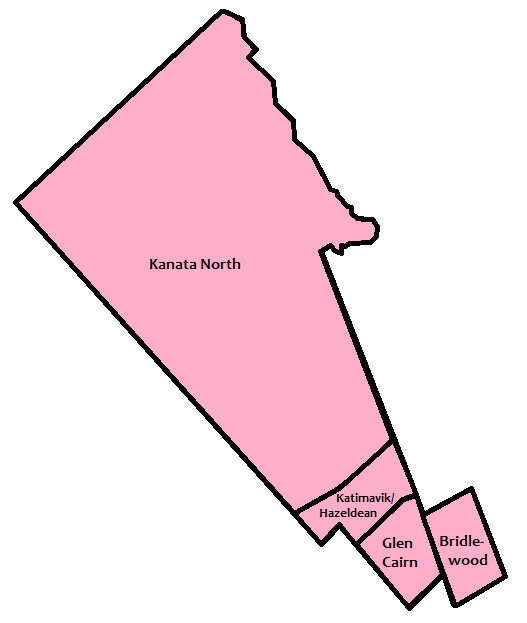
Map of Kanata's wards used in this election

Council

Candidate	Vote	%
Kanata North Ward
Sheila McKee (X)	1859	45.25
Naomi Ridout	1079	26.27
Bruce Gowling	647	15.75
Jim Malone	523	12.73
Katimavik/Hazeldean Ward
Richard Rutkowski	1092	35.70
Sharron Quinn	933	30.50
Andrew Ladanowski	760	24.84
Peter McNichol	274	8.96
Glen Cairn Ward
Pam Cripps (X)	1241	50.90
Doug Parsons	860	35.27
James Clute	337	13.82
Bridlewood Ward
Lance Mitchell (X)	1787	50.59
Stu Chandler	1745	49.41

== Nepean ==
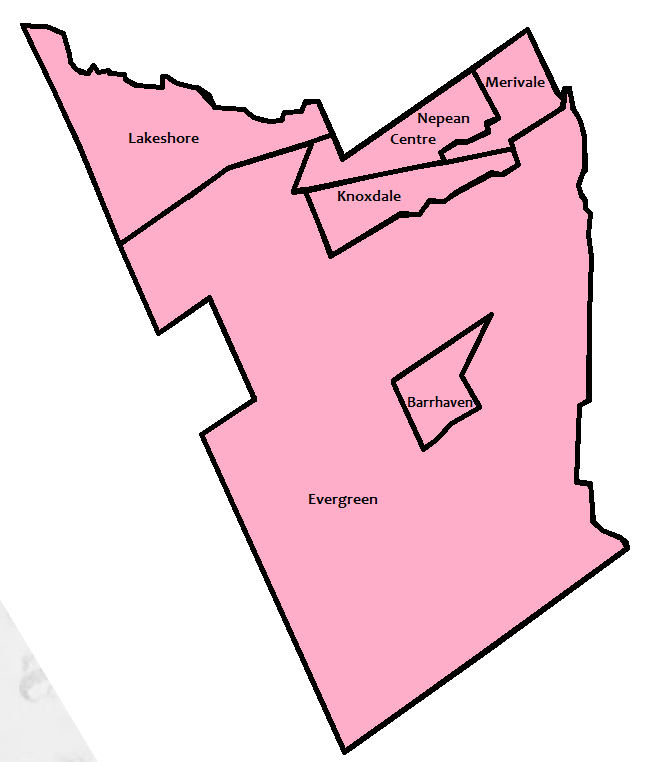
Map of Nepean's wards used in this election

Mayoral race

Candidate	Vote	%
Mary Pitt	15905	54.47
Doug Collins	9354	32.03
Fred Ennis	3722	12.75
Bob Higgs	221	0.76

Council

Candidate	Vote	%
Lakeshore Ward
Merv Sullivan (X)	2058	90.70
Bilal Syed	211	9.30
Nepean Centre Ward
Rick Chiarelli (X)	ACCLAIMED	
Evergreen Ward
Wayne Phillips	2973	52.81
Patrick Brennan	2657	47.19
Knoxdale Ward
Margaret Rywak (X)	ACCLAIMED	
Merivale Ward
Lee Ann Farnworth (X)	ACCLAIMED	
Barrhaven Ward
Jan Harder (X)	3222	54.72
Mike Kronick	1841	31.27
Bill Gordon	825	14.01

== Osgoode ==
Mayoral race

Candidate	Vote	%
Doug Thompson	2443	49.48
Jim Waddell	1663	33.68
Lloyd Cranston (X)	831	16.83

Council Four elected at large. Elected councillors indicated in bold.

Candidate	Vote	%
**George Wright**	3345	23.21
**Dwayn Acres** (X)	3027	21.01
**Dale Harley** (X)	2459	17.07
**Carol Parker**	2207	15.32
Walter Nibogie	1778	12.34
Marg McManus	1593	11.06

== Ottawa ==
Mayoral race

Candidate	Vote	%
Jim Watson	54,148	81.56
Robert G. Gauthier	8,037	12.11
Alexander Saikaley	4,209	6.34

== Rideau ==
Mayoral race

Candidate	Vote	%
Glenn Brooks	2603	64.56
James Stewart (X)	1247	30.92
Ronald Watson	182	4.51

Council

Candidate	Vote	%
**Ward 1**
George Pratt	ACCLAIMED	
**Ward 2**
Don Stephenson (X)	ACCLAIMED	
**Ward 3**
Rob Fraser (X)	ACCLAIMED	
**Ward 4**
Bonnie Gray	421	42.87
Clare Fassett	185	18.84
Wendy Braid	171	17.41
Brenda Wold	156	15.89
Graeme Nesbitt	49	4.99

== Rockcliffe Park ==
Mayoral race

Candidate	Vote	%
Patrick Murray (X)	ACCLAIMED	

Council Four elected at large. Elected councillors indicated in bold.

Candidate	Vote	%
**John Bull** (X)	ACCLAIMED	
**Jane Dobell** (X)	ACCLAIMED	
**Gordon Roston** (X)	ACCLAIMED	
**James Taylor** (X)	ACCLAIMED	

== Vanier ==
Mayoral race

Candidate	Vote	%
Guy Cousineau (X)	ACCLAIMED	

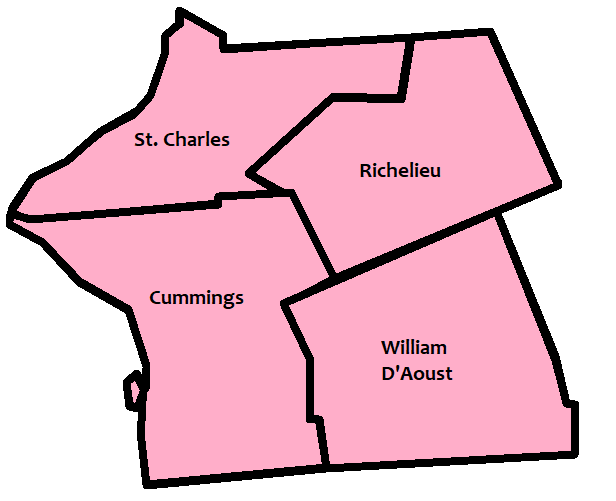
Map of Vanier's wards used in this election

Council

Candidate	Vote	%
**Cummings Ward**
Diane Doré	ACCLAIMED	
**William D'Aoust Ward**
Robert Crête (X)	ACCLAIMED	
**Richelieu Ward**
Yvon Dubé (X)	587	57.10
Théo Bretin	441	42.90
**St. Charles Ward**
Sylvain Boyer (X)	579	75.88
Alain Vachon	157	20.58
Terrence Valade McLaughlin	27	3.54

== West Carleton ==
Mayoral race

Candidate	Vote	%
Dwight Eastman (X)	2624	51.43
Beth Sweetman	1891	37.06
John Reid	587	11.51

Council

Candidate	Vote	%
**Ward 1**
Dan MacMillan (X)	920	66.67
Marlene Gramann	460	33.33
**Ward 2**
Bert Reitsma (X)	1199	67.13
Barry Portt	404	22.62
David Brown	183	10.25
**Ward 3**
Harold Daley	683	59.81
Guido Curridor	459	40.19
**Ward 4**
Orville Kemp (X)	ACCLAIMED	

== School trustees ==
=== English Language Public Board ===
The Ottawa Board of Education and the Carleton Board of Education were set to merge in 1998, and would become the Ottawa-Carleton District School Board, covering all of Ottawa-Carleton. Voters selected the trustees for the new board, which had yet to be named.

Zone 1 (West Carleton, Goulbourn and Marlborough Townships)	Vote	%
Lynn Scott	2,721	70.55
Bruce Sample	630	16.33
Len Russell	506	13.12

Zone 2 (Kanata)	Vote	%
Jim Libbey	2,386	29.36
Brian Parsons	2,268	27.91
David Gourlay	1,675	20.61
Tim Carrigan	1,268	15.60
Elat Lerner	434	5.34
Daren Givoque	96	1.18

Zone 3 (Bell-South Nepean Ward)	Vote	%
Norm MacDonald	5,832	84.62
George Eustace	1,060	15.38

Zone 4 (Nepean's Lakeshore, Knoxdale and Nepean Centre wards)	Vote	%
Alex Getty	4,810	64.90
Martin Taller	1,875	25.30
John Poirier	726	9.80

Zone 5 (Ottawa's Britannia-Richmond and Carleton wards)	Vote	%
Patty Anne Hill	4,302	50.62
Chris Jekel	3,185	37.48
Brian Loader	1,011	11.90

Zone 6 (Ottawa's Alta Vista-Canterbury and Southgate wards)	Vote	%
Russ Jackson	4,406	52.37
Deborah Morey	4,008	47.63

Zone 7 (Osgoode and North Gower Townships, and Gloucester's Blackburn Hamlet and Gloucester South wards)	Vote	%
Pam Morse	2,054	59.84
Ronald Daniel Britten	536	18.23
Robert Dotten	351	11.93

Zone 8 (Cumberland and Gloucester's Orléans North and Orléans South wards)	Vote	%
Sheryl MacDonald	2,737	39.96
Judy Lian	1,958	28.59
Bruce Tudin	956	13.96
Bryan Bourque	687	10.03
Amyn Keshavjee	511	7.46

Zone 9 (Ottawa's Capital and Bruyère-Strathcona wards)	Vote	%
Lynn Graham	5,945	83.76
Taylor Wentges	1,153	16.24

Zone 10 (Ottawa's Kitchissippi and Somerset wards)	Vote	%
Albert Chambers	6,457	83.03
Anthony Galveias	1,320	16.97

Zone 11 (Ottawa's River Ward and Nepean's Merivale Ward)	Vote	%
Andrew Lam	3,771	49.32
William Taylor	1,266	16.56
Susan Miller	1,175	15.37
Steven Jones	397	5.19

Zone 12 (Ottawa's Rideau Ward, Rockcliffe Park, Vanier and Beacon Hill-Cyrville Ward)	Vote	%
Cynthia Bled	2,842	51.61
Maret Swayze	2,665	48.39

== Sources ==
- Ottawa Citizen, November 11, 1997, edition
- Ottawa Sun, November 11, 1997, edition
