= Glabar Park =

- Neighbourhood
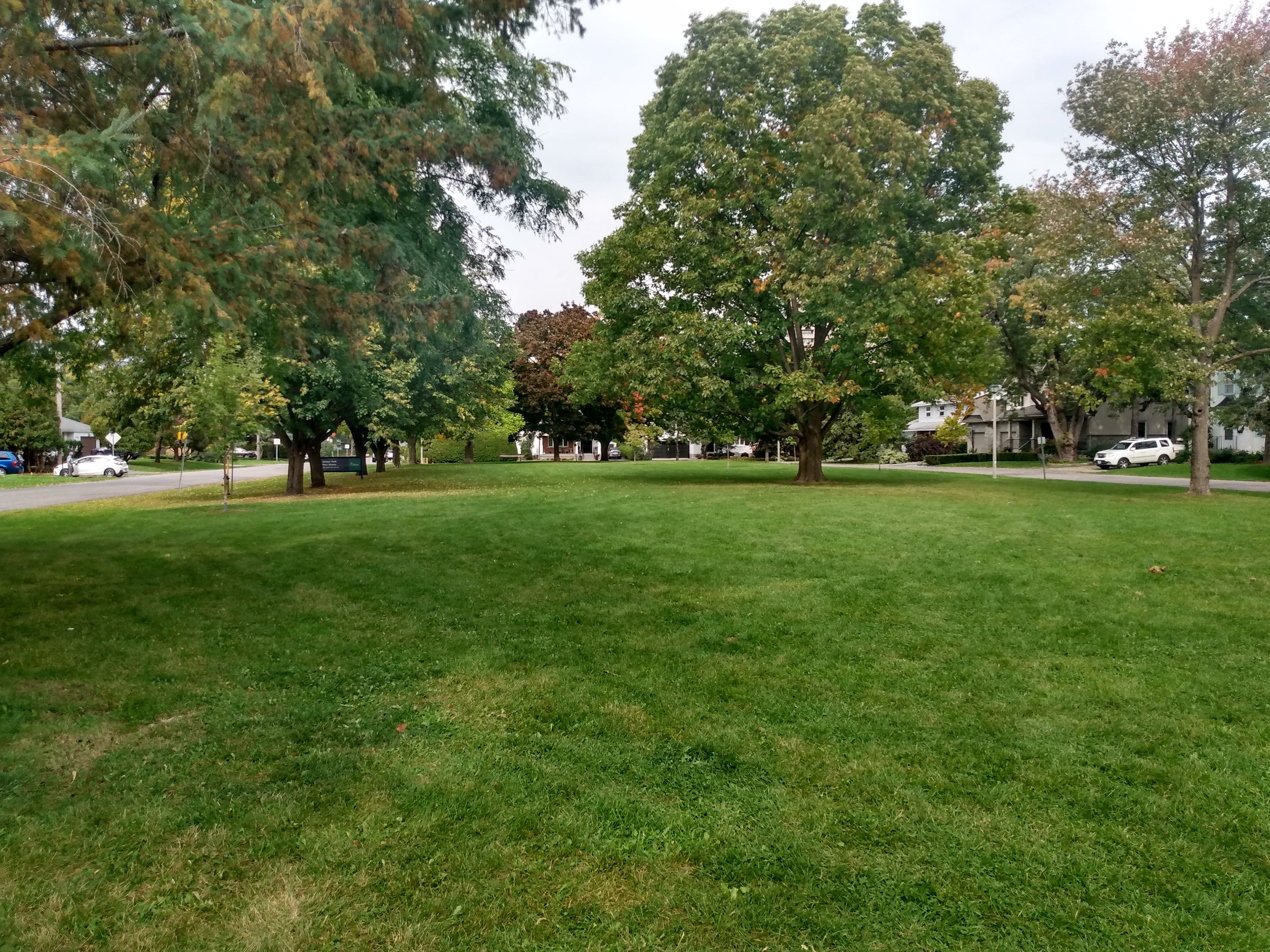
- Glabar Park

- Location within Ottawa
- Coordinates: 45.36726°N 75.76422°W
- Country: Canada
- Province: Ontario
- City: Ottawa

Government
  - MPs: Anita Vandenbeld
  - MPPs: Chandra Pasma
  - Councillors: Theresa Kavanagh
  - Governing body: Glabar Park Community Alliance
  - President: Trent Gray-Donald

Area
  - Total: 1.177 km^{2} (0.454 sq mi)
- Elevation: 80 m (260 ft)

Population (2016)
  - Total: 2,806
  - Density: 2,384/km^{2} (6,175/sq mi)
- Canada 2016 Census
- Time zone: UTC-5 (Eastern (EST))
- Forward sortation area: K2A
- Website: Glabar Park Community Alliance

Glabar Park is a neighbourhood in Bay Ward, in the west end of Ottawa, Ontario, Canada. It is bounded on the west by Woodroffe Avenue, north by Carling Avenue, south by The Queensway and on the east by Maitland Avenue. The population at the 2011 census was about 2,806.

Most of the neighbourhood was built in the 1950s. The first part of the neighbourhood was built in 1950 in the area around Hare Avenue (surrounding the eponymous Glabar Park) by the F. J. Shouldice Construction Company and sold by the Brownlee & McKeown Realtors. Further development in the neighbourhood was done by Teron Construction and subdivided by J. P. Chenier Ltd. In 1985 townhouses on Esterlawn Private were built which is off Fairlawn Avenue just behind Fairlawn Centre. In 2012, a few houses on Carling Avenue were demolished and turned into low-rise apartments. As of 2025, a few houses on Lenester have been demolished and turned into new homes.

The neighbourhood is home to D. Roy Kennedy Public School, St Paul's Presbyterian Church, and the Seventh-day Adventist Church of Ottawa. It is home to two parks, Kingsmere Park and Lorry Greenberg Park. Kingsmere Park is the park with more of a social setting, it features a large wading pool in the summer, and a double-sized hockey and skating rink in the winter. These amenities are provided by the City of Ottawa. Fairlawn Mall is on Carling Avenue across from Carlingwood.
