= McKellar Heights =

- Neighbourhood
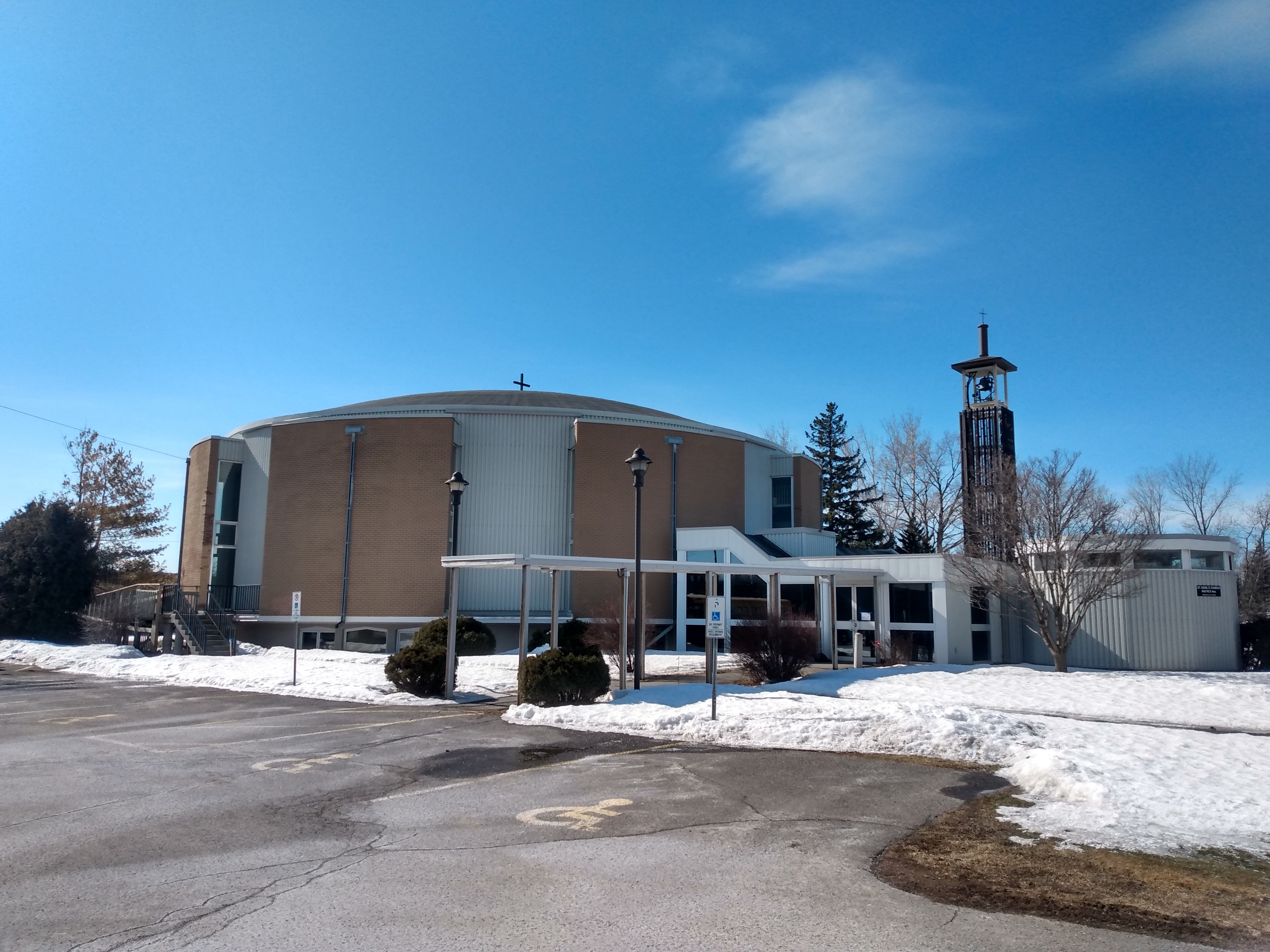
- St. Basil's Church

- Location in Ottawa
- Coordinates: 45°22′30″N 75°45′10″W
- Country: Canada
- Province: Ontario
- City: Ottawa

Government
  - MPs: Yasir Naqvi
  - MPPs: Catherine McKenney
  - Councillor: Jeff Leiper

Area
  - Total: 0.484 km^{2} (0.187 sq mi)
- Elevation: 80 m (260 ft)

Population (2016)
  - Total: 575
  - Density: 1,188.262/km^{2} (3,077.58/sq mi)
- Canada 2016 Census
- Time zone: UTC−5 (EST)
  - Summer (DST): UTC−4 (EDT)
- Forward sortation area: K2A

McKellar Heights is a small neighbourhood located in Kitchissippi Ward, in the west end of Ottawa, Ontario, Canada. The neighbourhood is generally triangular in shape, and is generally bounded on the north by Westboro (Carling Avenue), on the west by Glabar Park (Maitland Avenue), and on the south by Carlington (The Queensway). The population as of the Canada 2016 Census was 575.

The neighbourhood is home to the Jewish Community Campus of Ottawa. The campus features the Soloway Jewish Community Centre, Hillel Lodge (a nursing home), and Hillel Academy School. It is also home to St. Basil's Church, Bromley Road Baptist Church and Evergreen Park. There is also a small business park west of Clyde.

The area began to be developed around the 1920s, but truly began being built in 1949 when lots were sold on the "McKellar Homesite" adjacent the now defunct McKellar Golf Club located on the other side of Carling. The neighbourhood was mostly built in the 1950s.
