= Marlene Catterall =

Canadian politician (1939–2024)

Member of Parliament for Ottawa West—Nepean
- In office 1997–2006
- Preceded by: Riding created
- Succeeded by: John Baird

Member of Parliament for Ottawa West
- In office 1988–1997
- Preceded by: David Daubney
- Succeeded by: Riding abolished

Ottawa City Councillor for Britannia Ward
- In office 1976–1985
- Preceded by: Sandy Boyce
- Succeeded by: Ruth Wildgen

Personal details
- Born: Marlene Anne Petzold; March 1, 1939 Ottawa, Ontario, Canada
- Died: August 12, 2024 (aged 85) Ottawa, Ontario, Canada
- Party: Liberal
- Spouse: Ronald John Catterall (m. 1962)
- Children: 3
- Occupation: Teacher

Marlene Anne Catterall (née Petzold; March 1, 1939 – August 12, 2024) was a Canadian politician. Catterall was a member of the Liberal Party of Canada in the House of Commons of Canada. She represented the riding of Ottawa West—Nepean from 1997 to 2006 and as well as the riding of Ottawa West from 1988 to 1997.

== Early life and municipal career ==
Born in Ottawa, Ontario, Catterall was a secondary school teacher. She was educated at Carleton University. She served as an alderman on Ottawa City Council from 1976 to 1985. She also ran for mayor of Ottawa in 1985 but lost to Jim Durrell by over 20,000 votes.

== Parliamentary career ==
Catterall was a deputy government whip and chief government whip. She also was a parliamentary secretary to the President of the Treasury Board.

Catterall announced that she would not be a candidate in the 2006 federal election. Following her retirement, the riding changed from Liberal to Conservative by a margin of around 5,000 votes.

== Death ==
Catterall died in Ottawa on August 12, 2024, at the age of 85.

Political offices
| Preceded by Sandy Boyce | City councillors from Britannia Ward; 1976–1985 | Succeeded by Ruth Wildgen |
Parliament of Canada
| Preceded by David Daubney, Progressive Conservative | Member of Parliament from Ottawa West; 1988–1997 | Succeeded by Riding abolished |
| Preceded by Riding created | Member of Parliament from Ottawa West—Nepean; 1997–2006 | Succeeded by John Baird, Conservative |
