= Theresa Kavanagh =

Canadian politician

Ottawa City Councillor
- Incumbent
- Assumed office December 1, 2018
- Preceded by: Mark Taylor
- Constituency: Bay Ward

Deputy Mayor of Ottawa
- Incumbent
- Assumed office July 1, 2023 Serving with Glen Gower, Clarke Kelly

Ottawa-Carleton District School Board Trustee
- In office December 1, 2010 – December 1, 2018
- Preceded by: Doug Lloyd
- Succeeded by: Wendy Hough
- Constituency: Zone 4

Personal details
- Born: October 10, 1957 (age 68)
- Party: New Democratic Party
- Spouse: Alex Cullen
- Children: 2
- Education: University of Guelph

Theresa Kavanagh (born October 10, 1957) is a Canadian politician. She was elected to Ottawa City Council representing Bay Ward in the 2018 Ottawa municipal election.

== Early life and career ==
Kavanagh is the daughter of immigrants, having an Irish father and British mother. Her father was a steelworker at Stelco. She grew up in Hamilton, Ontario. She received a fine arts degree at the University of Guelph. In her youth, she joined Canada World Youth.

Kavanagh worked for a number of New Democratic Party Members of Parliament and worked for 21 years in the party whip's office.

Kavanagh is married to Alex Cullen, who was the city councillor for Bay Ward for 2000 to 2010 and was also the Liberal-turned-NDP Member of Provincial Parliament for Ottawa West from 1997 to 1999.

== Political career ==
Kavanagh's first venture into electoral politics was a run for the New Democratic Party in the 1988 Canadian federal election in the riding of Ottawa West. She finished third, behind Liberal Marlene Catterall and the incumbent, David Daubney of the Progressive Conservatives.

Kavanagh was easily elected as a trustee, representing Zone 4 (Bay Ward) to the Ottawa-Carleton District School Board in the 2010 Ottawa municipal election and was easily re-elected in 2014. When Bay Ward incumbent councillor Mark Taylor retired in 2018, Kavanagh entered the race to replace him. On election day, Kavanagh won 55% of the vote, easily beating Don Dransfield, the husband of the incumbent Liberal MP, Anita Vandenbeld.

In 2023, Kavanagh voted against the proposed "Landsdowne 2.0" project which would provide over $400 million of taxpayer-funded subsidies for the redevelopment of Lansdowne Park. The project was tentatively approved by a vote of 16 to 9.

Kavanagh has been a frequent advocate on issues related to the city's public transportation network, OC Transpo. In 2021, she supported an unsuccessful attempt to establish a judicial inquiry to investigate the failures of the O-Train system. In 2024, she voted against reductions in O-Train service that were narrowly approved by City Council by a vote of 13 to 12.

During her terms as councillor, Kavanagh has often advocated for women's issues and the participation of women in politics. In 2023, Kavanagh and Ariel Troster successfully campaigned to dub the section of Metcalfe Street in front of the Iranian embassy in honour of Mahsa Ahmini.

Kavanagh has been a leading opponent of the proposed development of a neighbourhood, known as Tewin, on greenfield land located in Ottawa's rural southeast. She argued that the development would contribute to urban sprawl and be a "burden on taxpayers". Other critics of the Tewin development have cited deforestation, and the cost of building new infrastructure for the area.

== Electoral record ==
2022 Ottawa municipal election: Bay Ward
Candidate	Popular vote			Expenditures
Candidate	Votes	%	±%	Expenditures
Theresa Kavanagh (X)	12,398	82.79	+27.62	$27,256.02
Robert Hill	1,659	11.08	–	$497.36
Othman Alhusain	919	6.14	–	$250.00
Total valid votes	14,976	96.45		
Total rejected, unmarked and declined votes	551	3.55		
Turnout	15,527	43.77	+2.14	
Eligible voters	35,473			
Note: Candidate campaign colours are based on the prominent colour used in campaign items (signs, literature, etc.) and are used as a visual differentiation between candidates.

2018 Ottawa Municipal Election: Bay Ward	Vote	%
Theresa Kavanagh	6,509	55.17
Don Dransfield	2,104	17.83
Erica Dath	1,793	15.20
Marc Lugert	851	7.21
Trevor Robinson	541	4.59

2014 Ottawa-Carleton District School Board Trustee Election: Zone 4	Vote	%
Theresa Kavanagh (X)	6,906	81.16
Calvin Palen	1,603	18.84

2010 Ottawa-Carleton District School Board Trustee Election: Zone 4	Vote	%
Theresa Kavanagh	6,654	68.57
Doug Lloyd (X)	2,506	25.82
Michael Pastien	544	5.61

1988 Canadian federal election: Ottawa West—Nepean
Party	Candidate	Votes	%
Liberal	Marlene Catterall	23,470	49.56
Progressive Conservative	David Daubney	18,299	38.64
New Democratic	Theresa Kavanagh	5,300	11.19
Communist	Peter Cavers	156	0.33
Independent	Donna Petersen	130	0.27
Total valid votes		47,355	
