= Jim Durrell =

Canadian politician

James A. Durrell

53rd Mayor of Ottawa
- In office December 1, 1985 – February 15, 1991
- Preceded by: Marion Dewar
- Succeeded by: Marc Laviolette

Ottawa Alderman
- In office December 1, 1980 – December 1, 1985
- Preceded by: Joe Quinn
- Succeeded by: George Brown
- Constituency: Riverside Ward

Personal details
- Born: December 15, 1946 (age 79) Montreal, Quebec, Canada

James A. Durrell CM (born December 15, 1946) is a Canadian business owner, former politician and president of the Ottawa Senators. He served as Mayor of Ottawa from 1985 to 1991.

Durrell has extensive governance experience and has served on numerous boards including the Business Development Bank of Canada, chairman of the Ottawa International Airport's Board of Directors, and chairman of the Ottawa Convention Centre. He also sat on the Ottawa Police Services Board. He has worked with numerous charities and organizations including the Ottawa Hospital, the United Way/Centraide Ottawa Campaign Cabinet, the Salvation Army, and the Kiwanis Club. Durrell received the Order of Canada in 2013. His Order of Canada medal capped off a year filled with tributes. In June he was awarded the Ottawa Chamber of Commerce's inaugural Lifetime Achievement Award, and three months later was given the Queen Elizabeth II Diamond Jubilee Medal. In November, he received the Order of Ottawa.

He owns Jim Durrell Capital Dodge. Durrell, an insurance executive, was elected to Ottawa City Council in 1980. When long serving mayor Marion Dewar retired Durrell defeated Marlene Catterall running on a right-of-centre platform.

During his time as mayor Durrell was most closely involved in professional sports. He worked to obtain tax grants for the Ottawa Rough Riders football team, encouraged a Triple A baseball team to locate in Ottawa, and most notably he won an NHL franchise for the city. Early in his term, he secured the 1988 Grey Cup for Ottawa, and was involved in Ottawa's bid for the 1994 Commonwealth Games, which were later granted to Victoria, British Columbia.

In 1990, Durrell ran for the presidency of the Liberal Party of Canada, but dropped out due to a police investigation into campaign donations during the 1988 election.

In December 1990, Durrell was named president of the new Ottawa Senators team, maintaining this job and his position as mayor. However, he resigned as mayor in January 1991 due to the demands of his Senators job. He served in this role for a number of years, before being forced to leave due to the deep financial troubles of the team. He also served president and chief executive officer of the Ottawa Rough Riders for four months during the team's final season.

In December 2012, he was named as a Member of the Order of Canada. He was the chair of the Ottawa Hydro Board. In early 2014, Durrell successfully fought skin cancer.
