= Redwood, Ottawa =

Neighbourhood in Ottawa, Ontario, Canada

Coordinates: 45.344545°N 75.793476°W

Redwood is a neighbourhood located in Ottawa's west end. The boundaries of the neighbourhood is Greenbank Road to the east, Baseline Road to the south, Morrison Drive (old Ottawa-Nepean border line) to the west and Highway 417 to the north.

Its sister neighbourhoods are Qualicum, Leslie Park, and Queensway Terrace.

== Residential areas and community housing ==
The majority of residents live in apartments and townhouses located on the east and west ends of the neighbourhood. Detached homes are closer to west side along Morrison Drive.

The development in the area started in the 1960s and continued throughout the 1970s and 1980s. There are many strips of townhouses on Baseline Road and Draper Avenue. Draper Avenue also runs into the Qualicum community.

The Qualicum Woods housing development was retrofitted and refurbished over the past several years with hundreds of row houses improving the aesthetic of the area.

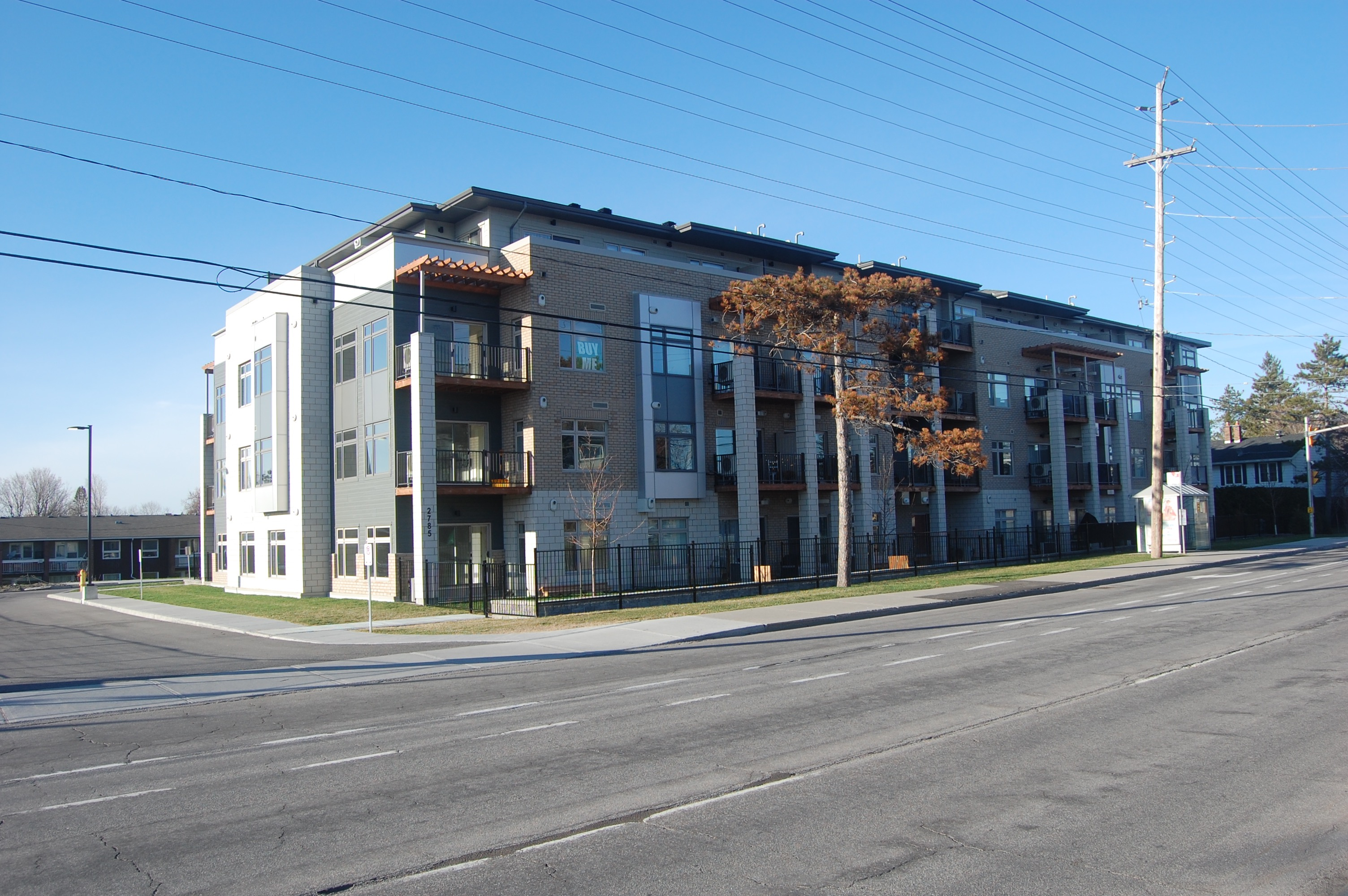
Qualicum Woods Crossing Condominium Development

The Qualicum Woods Crossing condominium project is also underway with one building completed (the Stanley) and the others underway. The City of Ottawa recently published an amendment request to the building plan with an addition of a medical clinic/hospital.

Project area for community housing is at the corner of Greenbank and Morrison Drive called Morrison Gardens.

There are two high-rises one rental called Greenbank Towers and one condo called the Redwoods Retirement Residence (bounded by Lisa, Draper and Greenbank) and Saxton and Birmingham Private which were built in the 1980s.

== Education ==
There are two schools in the area with both located next to each other on Draper Avenue:

- St. Paul High School (Ottawa Catholic School Board 1999)-formerly Sir John A. MacDonald High School (which closed in 1987) and then used as Champlain Elementary School and Collège catholique Franco-Ouest by the Conseil des écoles catholiques du Centre-Est
- Grant Alternative School (Ottawa-Carleton District School Board 2007-2017) - was the home of 120 elementary students (Kindergarten to Grade 6) in 2007 from 2720 Richmond Road. The school closed in June 2017 and is now empty. The building was formerly Christie Public School from 1969 to 2007.

== Recreation ==
Redwood is also home to two city parks:

- Morrison Park - a large sports-oriented park (2 soccer fields, track, basketball courts and baseball diamond) and shared with St. Paul's High School
- Lisa Park - a parkette with playground and outdoor wadding pool

== Economy ==
Commercial area is located along north side of Morrison Drive parallel to Highway 417. There is business park which is home to Lee Valley Tools (2 locations, one as retail store), private college Everest College, Trane, Vertias, Legere, Starr Gymnastics and Fitness, Y Owl's MacLure and many small offices and businesses.
