= Bayshore Shopping Centre =

Shopping mall in Ottawa, Canada

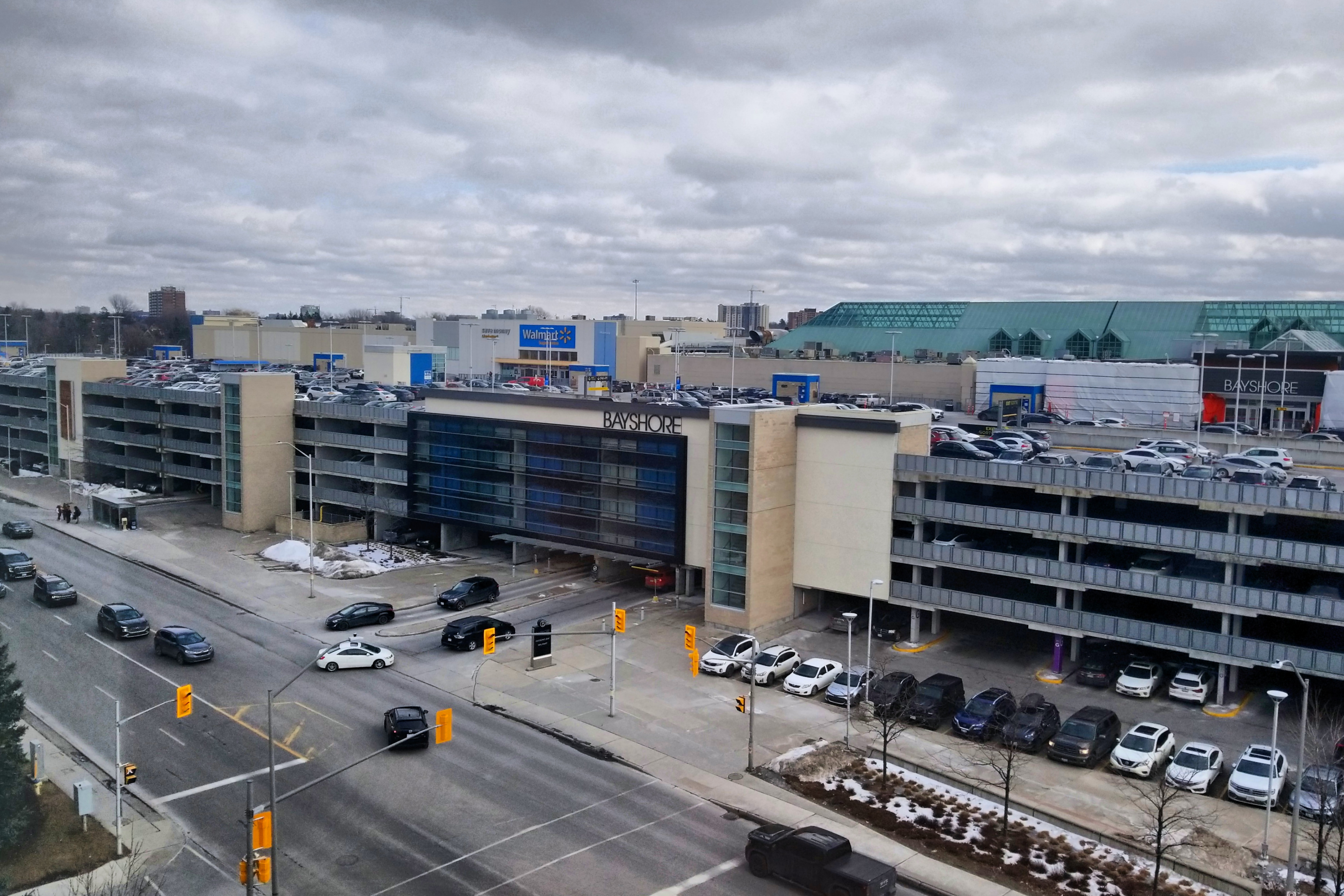
- Coordinates: 45°20′50″N 75°48′25″W
- Address: 100 Bayshore Drive; Ottawa, Ontario; K2B 8C1
- Opened: August 8, 1973; 53 years ago
- Owner: Kingsett Capital
- Num. of stores: 192
- Num. of anchor tenants: 3
- Floor area: 883,250 sq ft (82,056.6 m^{2})
- Floors: 3
- Parking: 3,806 spaces
- Public transit: OC Transpo: Bayshore Transitway Station; O-Train Line 1 (2025)
- Website: www.bayshoreshoppingcentre.com/en/

Bayshore Shopping Centre is a major shopping mall located in the Nepean district of Ottawa, Ontario, Canada. The mall is one of the busiest in the National Capital Region as it attracts almost 8 million visitors per year from across the city and the surrounding region. It is the second largest shopping mall in the National Capital Region. It is anchored by a combined Winners/HomeSense store and Walmart Supercentre.

== Construction and renovations ==
=== First phase (1973–1987) ===
- When the mall originally opened in 1973, it consisted of two floors. Its anchors consisted of Steinberg, Miracle Mart, The Bay and Eaton's. Miracle Mart was located on the floor above Steinberg's.
- In 1982, The Bay expanded from 123,000 to 181,000 square feet with the addition of a third floor.
- In the mid 1980s, the mall underwent an extensive renovation, including the addition of a third storey, upgraded passenger lift, and an escalator going directly from the ground floor to the top level. The colour scheme was also changed to a green and tan marble design. The original wrought-iron and wood railings were replaced by glass panels. The new design featured large peaked glass panels as the ceiling. Another level was added to the exterior parkade as well. The third floor opened on September 14, 1987. Overall, 65 stores were added, bringing the total number of stores to 165 in the mall. The four anchors were still the same from 1973 although Miracle Mart had been renamed to M at that point.

=== Second phase (1987–2012) ===
- The supermarket at Bayshore was rebranded to Loblaw's Your Independent Grocer banner, effective March 14, 1992, due to Steinberg's decision in January 1992 to exit the Eastern Ontario market.
- By 1994, the major tenants had slightly changed at the 760,000 square foot three-level regional mall that was now anchored by Eaton's, The Bay and Zellers.
- Following the closure of Eaton's in 1999, Zellers moved to the space in 2000, using two of the three floors of the defunct retailer. Les Ailes de la Mode opened in August 2001 its first store outside of Quebec in Zellers' former location (previously Steinberg's).
- Following the 2003 closure of Les Ailes de la Mode, the resulting vacant space on the south side of the first and second levels was reconstructed into two new areas. In the first level, the former corridor was closed and a new corridor and mall entrance created to its east. Stores in the new area include GNC, EB Games, The Body Shop, Shoppers Blvd (which later closed), Scentiments, Carol Baker Visage, Freyja Collections and MotoPhoto. A small eating area was also added, including a few new snack shops: Booster Juice, La Cremière and Cinnabon. Savory's Fine Foods store opened on June 15, 2006 (replacing the defunct Market Fresh store) and the new Pet World opened across from the grocery store on July 13. Savory's Fine Foods closed on August 19, 2007, marking the second exit by a specialty food retailer in the same location. Home Sense took over the vacant space in Fall 2009.
- On the second level, a new corridor includes stores such as Mexx, Cleo, Timothy's World Coffee, Place Bonbon, Winners and Swarovski. The two new sections of the mall are connected by an elevator and some escalators. Washrooms were added near the Gap replacing the older and smaller ones that were located near the main entrance of the level (by the Bayshore Dental Clinic).
- A new passenger elevator opposite to the existing one, that leads to the food court area of the third floor. It was also built to transport a greater number of customers from first to third or vice versa.
- The new Build-A-Bear Workshop opened its doors on June 15, 2006 at the old Cotton Ginny location. Cotton Ginny moved east to beside Northern Reflections, and just across from the new Aritzia store. A new store, Esprit occupied the remaining space starting in October. Also in 2006, Northern Reflections then moved to the location occupied by McIntosh & Watts. La Senza Express also opened during the fall replacing the former Campus Crew store.
- During the summer of 2006, the mall underwent an extensive renovation to its parking deck to replace the structure that existed since the mall's opening.

=== Third phase (2012–present) ===
Construction started in 2012 for a further expansion of the mall, adding 300,000 sq ft of retail space. Widespread renovations of the existing portions of the mall and the relocation of the food court have occurred. The former Zellers space is being converted to multiple retail outlets with an H&M on the first floor (opened in October 2013). Victoria's Secret opened in Bayshore on October 23, 2013 along with its sister store Pink. This marked the premiere of both brands in the Ottawa region. Over 500 attended the store launch, some who lined up the night before. Forever 21 opened its doors on September 27, 2014.

A Target store was built as a new anchor for the mall, but on January 15, 2015, Target Canada filed for bankruptcy and announced the closure of all of its stores, including the unopened Bayshore Shopping Centre location. On May 8, 2015, Walmart Canada announced its intent to acquire the locations of 13 Target Canada stores, including the Bayshore Shopping Centre location. Its new Supercentre store opened on the 3rd level of the mall on January 28, 2016 after relocation from its Lincoln Fields location.

== Major criminal incidents ==
- October 14, 1983: David Utman, a Nepean policeman, was shot to death at the mall by a convict. Peter Michael Collins was handed a life sentence in 1984 for first-degree murder, with the possibility of parole after 25 years. Collins apparently said "Your time is up" before shooting the officer. He died in 2015, the 32nd year of his custody.
- September 1, 1984: Cst. Ralph Erfle and Cst. Robin Easey were shot after interrupting an attempted robbery involving a Brinks truck delivery to the mall's Toronto-Dominion Bank branch. Of the five criminals involved, four were captured and sentenced, the other was shot and killed at the scene. Easey was paralyzed after the incident.
- March 28, 1994: Dave Murphy, 18 was stabbed 13 times by three men and nearly died. His life was saved by two paramedics.
- January 1999: Octavio Eva Gonzalez was murdered in a stabbing at the mall after he finished work there. Benny Jauvin was convicted of manslaughter and was given a net sentence of six years, a jail term some observers considered too lenient. A policeman was shot in the back and is now paralyzed.

== Transportation ==
- The mall is located near the interchanges of provincial highways 417 and 416, via the Richmond Road exits (exit 130 on Highway 417 and exit 75C on northbound Highway 416).
- Bayshore Shopping Centre is served by numerous routes at Bayshore Transitway Station, located just west of the mall.
