= Results of the 2014 Ontario general election by riding =

- June 12, 2014

The following is the list of riding-by-riding results, with candidate names, for the 2014 Ontario general election that was held on June 12, 2014.

== Abbreviations guide ==
Abbreviations of political parties used in these tables:

- CCP – Canadians' Choice Party
- Comm. – Communist Party of Canada (Ontario)
- EPP – Equal Parenting Party
- FCP – Family Coalition Party
- FPO – Freedom Party of Ontario
- Ind. – Independent
- NDP – Ontario New Democratic Party
- NOTA – None of the Above Party
- N. Ont – Northern Ontario Heritage Party
- Liberal – Ontario Liberal Party
- Libert. – Ontario Libertarian Party
- Mod. – Ontario Moderate Party
- COR – Ontario Provincial Confederation of Regions Party
- PPSN – Party for People with Special Needs
- PPO – Pauper Party of Ontario
- PC – Progressive Conservative Party of Ontario
- SP – Socialist Party of Ontario
- Green – Green Party of Ontario
- TP – The Peoples Political Party
- T – Trillium Party of Ontario
- VEP – Vegan Environmental Party

== Number of candidates by party ==
Nominated candidates for the 2014 Ontario general election
Party	Leader	Candidates
Canadians' Choice Party	Bahman Yazdanfar	4
Communist Party of Canada (Ontario)	Elizabeth Rowley	11
Equal Parenting Party	Dennis Valenta	2
Family Coalition Party	Eric Ames (interim)	6
Freedom Party of Ontario	Paul McKeever	42
Ontario New Democratic Party	Andrea Horwath	107
None of the Above Party	Greg Vezina	8
Northern Ontario Heritage Party	Edward Deibel	3
Ontario Liberal Party	Kathleen Wynne	107
Ontario Libertarian Party	Allen Small	74
Ontario Moderate Party	Yuri Duboisky	2
Ontario Provincial Confederation of Regions Party	Vacant	2
Party for People with Special Needs	Edward Deibel	3
Pauper Party of Ontario	John Turmel	3
Progressive Conservative Party of Ontario	Tim Hudak	107
Socialist Party of Ontario	Michael Laxer	2
Green Party of Ontario	Mike Schreiner	107
The Peoples Political Party	Kevin Clarke	5
Trillium Party of Ontario	Bob Yaciuk	2
Vegan Environmental Party	Paul Figueiras	5
Independent		14
Total		616

== Candidates and results ==
Candidates' names are as registered with Elections Ontario.
Vote totals are those validated by Elections Ontario; media coverage is usually based on preliminary totals and often differs from the final numbers.
† = not seeking re-election
‡ = running for re-election in different riding
§ = represents that the incumbent was refused nomination by their party
$ = represents that the incumbent was announced as nominated by their party but later chose to retire
# = represents that the incumbent was announced as nominated by their party but later lost that party's nomination through expulsion from caucus
bold indicates party leader

=== East ===
==== Ottawa ====
Electoral district	Candidates						Incumbent
Electoral district	Liberal	PC	NDP	Green	Libertarian	Other	Incumbent
Carleton—Mississippi Mills	Rosalyn Stevens; 20,472; 31.78%	Jack MacLaren; 30,590; 47.49%	John Hansen; 8,744; 13.57%	Andrew West; 4,614; 7.16%			Jack MacLaren
Nepean—Carleton	Jack Uppal; 21,974; 33.26%	Lisa MacLeod; 30,901; 46.77%	Ric Dagenais; 8,628; 13.06%	Gordon Kubanek; 3,630; 5.49%	Coreen Corcoran; 940; 1.42%		Lisa MacLeod
Ottawa Centre	Yasir Naqvi; 27,689; 52.02%	Rob Dekker; 9,678; 18.18%	Jennifer McKenzie; 10,894; 20.47%	Kevin O'Donnell; 4,163; 7.82%	Bruce Faulkner; 525; 0.99%	Larry Wasslen (Comm.); 283; 0.53%	Yasir Naqvi
Ottawa—Orléans	Marie-France Lalonde; 29,911; 53.50%	Andrew Lister; 18,525; 33.14%	Prosper M'Bemba-Meka; 5,022; 8.98%	Bob Bell; 2,036; 3.64%	Gerald Bourdeau; 411; 0.74%		Phil McNeely†
Ottawa South	John Fraser; 23,708; 49.96%	Matt Young; 15,235; 32.11%	Bronwyn Funiciello; 5,817; 12.26%	Matt Lakatos-Hayward; 2,034; 4.29%	Jean-Serge Brisson; 273; 0.58%	Espoir Manirambona (Comm.); 139; 0.29%	John Fraser
Ottawa South	John Fraser; 23,708; 49.96%	Matt Young; 15,235; 32.11%	Bronwyn Funiciello; 5,817; 12.26%	Matt Lakatos-Hayward; 2,034; 4.29%	Jean-Serge Brisson; 273; 0.58%	John Redins (PPSN); 244; 0.51%	John Fraser
Ottawa—Vanier	Madeleine Meilleur; 21,810; 55.55%	Martin Forget; 8,750; 22.29%	Hervé Ngamby; 5,228; 13.32%	David Bagler; 3,144; 8.01%	Phillip Richard; 329; 0.84%		Madeleine Meilleur
Ottawa West—Nepean	Bob Chiarelli; 21,035; 44.84%	Randall Denley; 15,895; 33.89%	Alex Cullen; 6,760; 14.41%	Alex Hill; 2,899; 6.18%	Matthew Brooks; 318; 0.68%		Bob Chiarelli

==== Eastern Ontario ====
Electoral district	Candidates						Incumbent
Electoral district	Liberal	PC	NDP	Green	Libertarian	Other	Incumbent
Glengarry— Prescott—Russell	Grant Crack; 23,565; 49.74%	Roxane Villeneuve Robertson; 15,429; 32.57%	Isabelle Sabourin; 5,902; 12.46%	Raymond St. Martin; 1,528; 3.23%	Darcy Neal Donnelly; 422; 0.89%	Marc-Antoine Gagnier (Ind.); 296; 0.92%	Grant Crack
Glengarry— Prescott—Russell	Grant Crack; 23,565; 49.74%	Roxane Villeneuve Robertson; 15,429; 32.57%	Isabelle Sabourin; 5,902; 12.46%	Raymond St. Martin; 1,528; 3.23%	Darcy Neal Donnelly; 422; 0.89%	Carl Leduc (FPO); 233; 0.49%	Grant Crack
Kingston and the Islands	Sophie Kiwala; 20,838; 41.59%	Mark Bain; 10,652; 21.26%	Mary Rita Holland; 14,811; 29.56%	Robert Kiley; 3,566; 7.12%		Jonathan Reid (FPO); 242; 0.48%	John Gerretsen†
Lanark—Frontenac— Lennox and Addington	Bill MacDonald; 15,037; 29.79%	Randy Hillier; 21,966; 43.52%	Dave Parkhill; 10,184; 20.18%	Cam Mather; 3,283; 6.50%			Randy Hillier
Leeds—Grenville	Christine Milks; 8,499; 20.49%	Steve Clark; 23,523; 56.07%	David Lundy; 7,219; 17.41%	Steve Bowering; 2,030; 4.89%	Harold Gabriel; 471; 1.14%		Steve Clark
Prince Edward—Hastings	Georgina Thompson; 15,105; 32.68%	Todd Smith; 19,281; 41.72%	Merrill Stewart; 8,829; 19.11%	Anita Payne; 2,448; 5.28%	Lindsay Forbes; 555; 1.20%		Todd Smith
Renfrew—Nipissing— Pembroke	Rod Boileau; 7,897; 19.11%	John Yakabuski; 25,241; 61.07%	Brian Dougherty; 5,978; 14.46%	Benjamin Wright; 1,337; 3.23%		Chad Beckwith-Smith (Ind.); 392; 0.95%	John Yakabuski
Renfrew—Nipissing— Pembroke	Rod Boileau; 7,897; 19.11%	John Yakabuski; 25,241; 61.07%	Brian Dougherty; 5,978; 14.46%	Benjamin Wright; 1,337; 3.23%		Murray Reid (COR); 489; 1.18%	John Yakabuski
Stormont—Dundas— South Glengarry	John Earle; 9,250; 23.20%	Jim McDonell; 20,624; 51.73%	Elaine MacDonald; 8,336; 20.88%	Sharron Norman; 1,067; 2.68%	Shawn McRae; 602; 1.51%		Jim McDonell

=== Central Ontario ===
Electoral district	Candidates						Incumbent
Electoral district	Liberal	PC	NDP	Green	Libertarian	Other	Incumbent
Barrie	Ann Hoggarth; 19,916; 40.69%	Rod Jackson; 17,667; 36.10%	David Bradbury; 7.975; 16.29%	Bonnie North; 3.018; 6.17%	Darren Roskam; 366; 0.75%		Rod Jackson
Bruce—Grey—Owen Sound	Ellen Anderson; 11,586; 27.06%	Bill Walker; 20,359; 47.55%	Karen Gventer; 6,787; 15.85%	Jenny Parsons; 3,696; 8.63%	Caleb Voskamp; 188; 0.44%	Jamie D. Spence (FPO); 200; 0.47%	Bill Walker
Dufferin—Caledon	Bobbie Daid; 13,861; 30.66%	Sylvia Jones; 18,017; 39.86%	Rehya Rebecca Yazbek; 5,269; 11.66%	Karren Wallace; 7,518; 16.63%	Daniel Kowalewski; 538; 1.19%		Sylvia Jones
Durham	Granville Anderson; 19,816; 36.45%	Mike Patrick; 18,640; 34.29%	Derek Spence; 13,094; 24.08%	Halyna Zalucky; 2,382; 4.26%	Conner Toye; 434; 0.90%		John O'Toole†
Haliburton—Kawartha Lakes—Brock	Rick Johnson; 18,512; 35.03%	Laurie Scott; 21,641; 41.09%	Don Abel; 10,431; 19.74%	Arsalan Ahmad; 2,255; 4.27%			Laurie Scott
Newmarket—Aurora	Chris Ballard; 22,997; 43.94%	Jane Twinney; 19,585; 37.42%	Angus Duff; 6,023; 11.51%	Andrew Roblin; 2,144; 4.10%	Jason Jenkins; 579; 1.11%	Dorian Baxter (CCP), 922; 1.76%	Frank Klees†
Newmarket—Aurora	Chris Ballard; 22,997; 43.94%	Jane Twinney; 19,585; 37.42%	Angus Duff; 6,023; 11.51%	Andrew Roblin; 2,144; 4.10%	Jason Jenkins; 579; 1.11%	Bob Yaciuk (T); 83; 0.16%	Frank Klees†
Northumberland— Quinte West	Lou Rinaldi; 23,419; 42.97%	Rob Milligan; 19,583; 35.93%	Kira Mees; 9,211; 16.91%	Gudrun Ludorf-Weaver; 2,283; 4.19%			Rob Milligan
Peterborough	Jeff Leal; 24,709; 46.33%	Scott Stewart; 15,907; 29.80%	Sheila Wood; 9,728; 18.24%	Gary Beamish; 2,287; 4.19%		Andrea Gar Quiano (SP); 132; 0.25%	Jeff Leal
Peterborough	Jeff Leal; 24,709; 46.33%	Scott Stewart; 15,907; 29.80%	Sheila Wood; 9,728; 18.24%	Gary Beamish; 2,287; 4.19%		Wayne Matheson (FPO); 121; 0.23%	Jeff Leal
Peterborough	Jeff Leal; 24,709; 46.33%	Scott Stewart; 15,907; 29.80%	Sheila Wood; 9,728; 18.24%	Gary Beamish; 2,287; 4.19%		Gerard Faux (PPO); 52; 0.10%	Jeff Leal
Peterborough	Jeff Leal; 24,709; 46.33%	Scott Stewart; 15,907; 29.80%	Sheila Wood; 9,728; 18.24%	Gary Beamish; 2,287; 4.19%		Brian Martindale (Ind.); 395; 0.74%	Jeff Leal
Simcoe—Grey	Lorne Kenney; 17,199; 31.18%	Jim Wilson; 25,988; 47.12%	David Matthews; 7,793; 14.13%	Jesseca Dudun; 4,172; 7.56%			Jim Wilson
Simcoe North	Fred Larsen; 16,413; 32.53%	Garfield Dunlop; 22,179; 43.96%	Doris Middleton; 7,896; 15.55%	Peter Stubbins; 4,013; 7.95%			Garfield Dunlop
York—Simcoe	Loralea Carruthers; 16,276; 34.53%	Julia Munro; 19,025; 40.40%	Laura Bowman; 8,420; 17.88%	Peter Elgie; 2,046; 6.26%	Craig Wallace; 419; 0.89%		Julia Munro

=== 905 Belt ===
==== Durham & York ====
Electoral district	Candidates						Incumbent
Electoral district	Liberal	PC	NDP	Green	Libertarian	Other	Incumbent
Ajax—Pickering	Joe Dickson; 26,251; 51.06%	Todd McCarthy; 14,999; 29.17%	Jermaine King; 8,274; 16.09%	Adam Narraway; 1,589; 3.09%	Kyle Stewart; 301; 0.59%		Joe Dickson
Markham—Unionville	Michael Chan; 21,517; 51.33%	Shan Thayaparan; 14,241; 33.98%	Nadine Kormos Hawkins; 4,205; 10.03%	Myles O'Brien; 1,509; 3.60%	**Allen Small**; 444; 1.06%		Michael Chan
Oak Ridges—Markham	Helena Jaczek; 36,782; 45.55%	Farid Wassef; 30,256; 37.47%	Miles Krauter; 9,355; 11.58%	Emilia Melara; 2,791; 3.46%	Karl Boelling; 1,358; 1.68%	Gennady Vilensky (T); 213; 0.26%	Helena Jaczek
Oshawa	Esrick Quintyn; 9,051; 19.01%	Jerry Ouellette; 14,540; 30.54%	Jennifer French; 22,232; 46.70%	Becky Smit; 1,785; 3.75%			Jerry Ouellette
Pickering— Scarborough East	Tracy MacCharles; 23,206; 51.95%	Kevin Gaudet; 12,638; 28.30%	Eileen Higdon; 6,600; 14.78%	Anthony Navarro; 1,564; 3.50%	Scott Hoefig; 463; 1.03%	Matt Oliver (FPO); 191; 0.43%	Tracy MacCharles
Richmond Hill	Reza Moridi; 20,455; 47.78%	Vic Gupta; 15,642; 36.54%	Adam DeVita; 4,697; 10.97%	Rachael Lave; 1,344; 3.14%	Igor Bily; 510; 1.19%	Yuri Duboisky (Mod.); 160; 0.37%	Reza Moridi
Thornhill	Sandra Yeung Racco; 21,780; 43.78%	Gila Martow; 21,886; 43.99%	Cindy Hackelberg; 4,052; 8.14%	David Bergart; 1,229; 2.47%	Gene Balfour; 571; 1.15%	Erin Goodwin (FPO); 233; 0.49%	Gila Martow
Vaughan	Steven Del Duca; 33,877; 56.21%	Peter Meffe; 16,989; 28.17%	Marco Coletta; 6,942; 11.52%	Matthew Pankhurst; 1,350; 2.24%	Paolo Fabrizio; 1,121; 1.86%		Steven Del Duca
Whitby—Oshawa	Ajay Krishnan; 18,617; 31.50%	Christine Elliott; 24,027; 40.65%	Ryan Kelly; 13,621; 23.04%	Stacey Leadbetter; 2,523; 4.27%		Douglas Thom (FPO); 322; 0.54%	Christine Elliott

==== Brampton, Mississauga & Oakville ====
Electoral district	Candidates						Incumbent
Electoral district	Liberal	PC	NDP	Green	Libertarian	Other	Incumbent
Bramalea—Gore— Malton	Kuldip Kular; 17,873; 33.68%	Harjit Jaswal; 9,403; 17.72%	Jagmeet Singh; 23,519; 44.31%	Pauline Thornham; 2,277; 4.29%			Jagmeet Singh
Brampton—Springdale	Harinder Malhi; 16,927; 40.06%	Pam Hundal; 10,117; 23.95%	Gurpreet Dhillon; 13,513; 31.98%	Laila Zarrabi Yan; 1,311; 3.10%		Elizabeth Hill (Comm.); 382; 0.90%	Vacant
Brampton West	Vic Dhillon; 24,832; 45.23%	Randeep Sandhu; 13,363; 24.34%	Gugni Gill Panaich; 12,985; 23.65%	Sayyeda Ebrahim; 1,504; 2.74%	Luis Chacin; 878; 1.60%	Ted Harlson (FPO); 540; 0.98%	Vic Dhillon
Brampton West	Vic Dhillon; 24,832; 45.23%	Randeep Sandhu; 13,363; 24.34%	Gugni Gill Panaich; 12,985; 23.65%	Sayyeda Ebrahim; 1,504; 2.74%	Luis Chacin; 878; 1.60%	Dan Sullivan (FCP); 800; 1.46%	Vic Dhillon
Mississauga— Brampton South	Amrit Mangat; 19,923; 48.21%	Amarjeet Gill; 11,251; 27.23%	Kevin Troake; 6,906; 16.72%	Kathy Acheson; 1,302; 3.15%	Richard Levesque; 993; 2.40%	Robert Alilovic (Ind.); 351; 0.85%	Amrit Mangat
Mississauga— Brampton South	Amrit Mangat; 19,923; 48.21%	Amarjeet Gill; 11,251; 27.23%	Kevin Troake; 6,906; 16.72%	Kathy Acheson; 1,302; 3.15%	Richard Levesque; 993; 2.40%	Kathleen Vezina (NOTA); 597; 1.45%	Amrit Mangat
Mississauga East— Cooksville	Dipika Damerla; 20,934; 52.33%	Zoran Churchin; 10,479; 26.20%	Fayaz Karim; 6,158; 15.39%	Linh Nguyen; 1,408; 3.52%	Levko Iwanusiw; 788; 1.57%	Dolly Catena (EPP); 234; 0.54%	Dipika Damerla
Mississauga—Erindale	Harinder Takhar; 25,356; 48.98%	Jeff White; 15,474; 29.89%	Michelle Bilek; 7,730; 14.93%	Vivek Gupta; 1,216; 2.35%	Christopher Jewell; 873; 1.69%	Nabila Kiyani (FCP); 474; 0.92%	Harinder Takhar
Mississauga—Erindale	Harinder Takhar; 25,356; 48.98%	Jeff White; 15,474; 29.89%	Michelle Bilek; 7,730; 14.93%	Vivek Gupta; 1,216; 2.35%	Christopher Jewell; 873; 1.69%	Greg Vezina (NOTA); 641; 1.24%	Harinder Takhar
Mississauga South	Charles Sousa; 22,192; 50.76%	Effie Triantafilopoulos; 14,514; 33.20%	Boris Rosolak; 4,649; 10.63%	Lloyd Jones; 1,418; 3.24%	James Judson; 355; 0.81%	Andrew Weber (NOTA); 591; 1.35%	Charles Sousa
Mississauga—Streetsville	Bob Delaney; 22,587; 52.57%	Nina Tangri; 12,060; 28.07%	Anju Sikka; 5,885; 13.70%	Scott Warner; 1,566; 3.64%	David Walach; 342; 0.80%	Alexander Vezina (NOTA); 524; 1.22%	Bob Delaney
Oakville	Kevin Flynn; 24,717; 49.40%	Larry Scott; 18,921; 37.81%	Che Marville; 3,994; 7.98%	Andrew Chlobowski; 1,887; 3.77%	David Clement; 386; 0.77%	Silvio Ursomarzo (FPO); 132; 0.26%	Kevin Flynn

=== Toronto ===
==== Scarborough ====
Electoral district	Candidates					Incumbent
Electoral district	Liberal	PC	NDP	Green	Other	Incumbent
Scarborough—Agincourt	Soo Wong; 17,332; 49.84%	Liang Chen; 12,041; 34.63%	Alex Wilson; 4,105; 11.81%	Pauline Thompson; 907; 2.61%	**Kevin Clarke** (TP); 387; 1.11%	Soo Wong
Scarborough Centre	Brad Duguid; 19,390; 55.05%	David Ramalho; 7,599; 21.58%	Carol Baker; 7,145; 20.29%	Edward Yaghledjian; 1,086; 3.08%		Brad Duguid
Scarborough—Guildwood	Mitzie Hunter; 17,318; 49.89%	Ken Kirupa; 9,721; 28.01%	Shuja Syed; 5,894; 16.98%	Jeffrey W.R. Bustard; 1,034; 2.98%	Richard Kerr (Libert.); 476; 1.37%	Mitzie Hunter
Scarborough—Guildwood	Mitzie Hunter; 17,318; 49.89%	Ken Kirupa; 9,721; 28.01%	Shuja Syed; 5,894; 16.98%	Jeffrey W.R. Bustard; 1,034; 2.98%	Khalid Mokhtarzada (FPO); 148; 0.43%	Mitzie Hunter
Scarborough—Guildwood	Mitzie Hunter; 17,318; 49.89%	Ken Kirupa; 9,721; 28.01%	Shuja Syed; 5,894; 16.98%	Jeffrey W.R. Bustard; 1,034; 2.98%	John Sawdon (CCP); 120; 0.35%	Mitzie Hunter
Scarborough—Rouge River	Bas Balkissoon; 16,095; 38.71%	Raymond Cho; 11,500; 27.66%	Neethan Shan; 13,019; 31.31%	George B. Singh; 571; 1.37%	Amir Khan (NOTA); 398; 0.96%	Bas Balkissoon
Scarborough Southwest	Lorenzo Berardinetti; 18,420; 50.23%	Nita Kang; 7,573; 20.65%	Jessie Macaulay; 8,674; 23.65%	David Del Grande; 1,493; 5.30%	Tyler Rose (Libert.); 328; 0.89%	Lorenzo Berardinetti
Scarborough Southwest	Lorenzo Berardinetti; 18,420; 50.23%	Nita Kang; 7,573; 20.65%	Jessie Macaulay; 8,674; 23.65%	David Del Grande; 1,493; 5.30%	Jean-Baptiste Foaleng (Ind.); 185; 0.50%	Lorenzo Berardinetti

==== North York and North Toronto ====
Electoral district	Candidates						Incumbent
Electoral district	Liberal	PC	NDP	Green	Freedom	Other	Incumbent
Don Valley East	Michael Coteau; 19,248; 55.71%	Angela Kennedy; 9,257; 26.80%	Akil Sadikali; 4,500; 13.03%	Christopher McLeod; 1,256; 3.64%	Wayne Simmons; 287; 0.83%		Michael Coteau
Don Valley West	**Kathleen Wynne**; 26,215; 57.01%	David Porter; 14,082; 30.63%	Khalid Ahmed; 3,569; 7.76%	Louis Fliss; 1,286; 2.80%	Tracy Curley; 83; 0.18%	Dimitrios Kabitsis (Comm.); 153; 0.35%	Kathleen Wynne
Don Valley West	**Kathleen Wynne**; 26,215; 57.01%	David Porter; 14,082; 30.63%	Khalid Ahmed; 3,569; 7.76%	Louis Fliss; 1,286; 2.80%	Tracy Curley; 83; 0.18%	Patrick Boyd (Libert.); 338; 0.74%	Kathleen Wynne
Don Valley West	**Kathleen Wynne**; 26,215; 57.01%	David Porter; 14,082; 30.63%	Khalid Ahmed; 3,569; 7.76%	Louis Fliss; 1,286; 2.80%	Tracy Curley; 83; 0.18%	Brock Burrows (Ind.); 138; 0.30%	Kathleen Wynne
Don Valley West	**Kathleen Wynne**; 26,215; 57.01%	David Porter; 14,082; 30.63%	Khalid Ahmed; 3,569; 7.76%	Louis Fliss; 1,286; 2.80%	Tracy Curley; 83; 0.18%	Rosemary Waigh (VEP); 116; 0.25%	Kathleen Wynne
Eglinton—Lawrence	Michael Colle; 22,855; 54.80%	Robin Martin; 14,709; 35.27%	Thomas Gallezot; 3,060; 7.33%	Lucas C. McCann; 1,305; 3.13%	Michael Bone; 264; 0.63%	Erwin Sniedzins (Ind.); 143; 0.34%	Michael Colle
Willowdale	David Zimmer; 24,300; 52.58%	Michael Ceci; 15,468; 33.47%	Alexander Brown; 4,693; 10.15%	Teresa Pun; 1,758; 3.80%			David Zimmer
York Centre	Monte Kwinter; 16,935; 47.89%	Avi Yufest; 11,125; 31.46%	John Fagan; 5,645; 15.96%	Josh Borenstein; 1,163; 3.29%	Laurence Cherniak; 493; 1.39%		Monte Kwinter

==== Toronto & East York ====
Electoral district	Candidates							Incumbent
Electoral district	Liberal	PC	NDP	Green	Libertarian	Freedom	Other	Incumbent
Beaches—East York	Arthur Potts; 17,218; 40.09%	Nicolas Johnson; 5,982; 13.93%	Michael Prue; 16,737; 38.93%	Debra Scott; 2,329; 5.42%	Alex Lindsay; 524; 1.22%	Naomi Poley-Fisher; 158; 0.37%		Michael Prue
Davenport	Cristina Martins; 16,272; 45.61%	Lan Daniel; 2,665; 7.47%	Jonah Schein; 14,322; 40.15%	Daniel Stein; 1,784; 5.00%	Nunzio Venuto; 250; 0.70%	Franz Cauchi; 110; 0.31%	Mariam Ahmad (Comm.); 172; 0.48%	Jonah Schein
Davenport	Cristina Martins; 16,272; 45.61%	Lan Daniel; 2,665; 7.47%	Jonah Schein; 14,322; 40.15%	Daniel Stein; 1,784; 5.00%	Nunzio Venuto; 250; 0.70%	Franz Cauchi; 110; 0.31%	Troy Young (TP); 99; 0.28%	Jonah Schein
St. Paul's	Eric Hoskins; 30,027; 59.74%	Justine Deluce; 12,037; 23.95%	Luke Savage; 5,056; 10.06%	Josh Rachlis; 2,569; 5.11%	John Kittredge; 407; 0.81%	Mike Rita; 165; 0.33%		Eric Hoskins
Toronto Centre	Glen Murray; 29,935; 58.47%	Martin Abell; 9,498; 18.55%	Kate Sellar; 8,140; 15.90%	Mark Daye; 2,265; 4.42%	Judi Falardeau; 551; 1.08%	Chris Goodwin; 137; 0.27%	Lada Alekseychuk (PPSN); 200; 0.39%	Glen Murray
Toronto Centre	Glen Murray; 29,935; 58.47%	Martin Abell; 9,498; 18.55%	Kate Sellar; 8,140; 15.90%	Mark Daye; 2,265; 4.42%	Judi Falardeau; 551; 1.08%	Chris Goodwin; 137; 0.27%	Drew Garvie (Comm.); 163; 0.32%	Glen Murray
Toronto Centre	Glen Murray; 29,935; 58.47%	Martin Abell; 9,498; 18.55%	Kate Sellar; 8,140; 15.90%	Mark Daye; 2,265; 4.42%	Judi Falardeau; 551; 1.08%	Chris Goodwin; 137; 0.27%	Robin Nurse (TP); 76; 0.15%	Glen Murray
Toronto Centre	Glen Murray; 29,935; 58.47%	Martin Abell; 9,498; 18.55%	Kate Sellar; 8,140; 15.90%	Mark Daye; 2,265; 4.42%	Judi Falardeau; 551; 1.08%	Chris Goodwin; 137; 0.27%	Harvey Rotenberg (VEP); 152; 0.30%	Glen Murray
Toronto Centre	Glen Murray; 29,935; 58.47%	Martin Abell; 9,498; 18.55%	Kate Sellar; 8,140; 15.90%	Mark Daye; 2,265; 4.42%	Judi Falardeau; 551; 1.08%	Chris Goodwin; 137; 0.27%	**Bahman Yazdanfar** (CCP); 78; 0.15%	Glen Murray
Toronto—Danforth	Rob Newman; 15,983; 37.16%	Naomi Solomon; 4,304; 10.01%	Peter Tabuns; 19,190; 44.61%	Rachel Power; 2,351; 5.47%	Thomas Armstrong; 501; 1.16%	Tristan Parlette; 121; 0.28%	**Elizabeth Rowley** (Comm.); 172; 0.40%	Peter Tabuns
Toronto—Danforth	Rob Newman; 15,983; 37.16%	Naomi Solomon; 4,304; 10.01%	Peter Tabuns; 19,190; 44.61%	Rachel Power; 2,351; 5.47%	Thomas Armstrong; 501; 1.16%	Tristan Parlette; 121; 0.28%	Ali Azaroghli (TP); 79; 0.18%	Peter Tabuns
Toronto—Danforth	Rob Newman; 15,983; 37.16%	Naomi Solomon; 4,304; 10.01%	Peter Tabuns; 19,190; 44.61%	Rachel Power; 2,351; 5.47%	Thomas Armstrong; 501; 1.16%	Tristan Parlette; 121; 0.28%	Simon Luisi (VEP); 149; 0.35%	Peter Tabuns
Toronto—Danforth	Rob Newman; 15,983; 37.16%	Naomi Solomon; 4,304; 10.01%	Peter Tabuns; 19,190; 44.61%	Rachel Power; 2,351; 5.47%	Thomas Armstrong; 501; 1.16%	Tristan Parlette; 121; 0.28%	John Richardson (CCP); 167; 0.39%	Peter Tabuns
Trinity—Spadina	Han Dong; 26,613; 46.34%	Roberta Scott; 8,035; 13.99%	Rosario Marchese; 17,442; 30.37%	Tim Grant; 4,033; 7.02%	Andrew Echevarria; 734; 1.28%		**Paul Figueiras** (VEP); 307; 0.53%	Rosario Marchese
Trinity—Spadina	Han Dong; 26,613; 46.34%	Roberta Scott; 8,035; 13.99%	Rosario Marchese; 17,442; 30.37%	Tim Grant; 4,033; 7.02%	Andrew Echevarria; 734; 1.28%		Dan King (PPSN); 270; 0.74%	Rosario Marchese

==== Etobicoke & York ====
Electoral district	Candidates							Incumbent
Electoral district	Liberal	PC	NDP	Green	Libertarian	Freedom	Other	Incumbent
Etobicoke Centre	Yvan Baker; 23,848; 50.28%	Pina Martino; 15,520; 32.72%	Chris Jones; 5,758; 12.14%	George Morrison; 1,254; 2.64%	Alexander T. Bussmann; 528; 1.11%	Andrew Kuess; 189; 0.40%	John J. Martins (TP); 193; 0.41%	Donna Cansfield†
Etobicoke Centre	Yvan Baker; 23,848; 50.28%	Pina Martino; 15,520; 32.72%	Chris Jones; 5,758; 12.14%	George Morrison; 1,254; 2.64%	Alexander T. Bussmann; 528; 1.11%	Andrew Kuess; 189; 0.40%	Felicia Trigiani (VEP); 142; 0.30%	Donna Cansfield†
Etobicoke—Lakeshore	Peter Milczyn; 24,311; 47.49%	Doug Holyday; 17,587; 34.35%	P. C. Choo; 6,362; 12.43%	Angela Salewsky; 2,064; 4.03%	Mark Wrzesniewski; 336; 0.66%	Jeff Merklinger; 189; 0.37%	Natalie Lochwin (SP); 236; 0.46%	Doug Holyday
Etobicoke—Lakeshore	Peter Milczyn; 24,311; 47.49%	Doug Holyday; 17,587; 34.35%	P. C. Choo; 6,362; 12.43%	Angela Salewsky; 2,064; 4.03%	Mark Wrzesniewski; 336; 0.66%	Jeff Merklinger; 189; 0.37%	Ian Lytvyn (Mod.); 108; 0.21%	Doug Holyday
Etobicoke North	Shafiq Qaadri; 12,168; 44.90%	Tony Milone; 6,163; 22.74%	Nigel Barriffe; 7,103; 26.21%	Kenny Robertson; 677; 2.50%	Allan deRoo; 706; 2.61%	James McConnell; 281; 1.04%		Shafiq Qaadri
Parkdale—High Park	Nancy Leblanc; 17,841; 39.56%	Jamie Ellerton; 5,787; 12.83%	Cheri DiNovo; 18,385; 40.77%	Tim Rudkins; 2,479; 5.50%	Redmond Weissenberger; 191; 0.42%	Melanie Motz; 105; 0.23%	Matthew Vezina (NOTA); 305; 0.68%	Cheri DiNovo
York South—Weston	Laura Albanese; 15,669; 47.85%	Andrew Ffrench; 3,687; 11.26%	Paul Ferreira; 12,200; 37.25%	Jessica Higgins; 797; 2.43%		Eric Compton; 249; 0.76%	Abi Issa (Ind.); 146; 0.45%	Laura Albanese
York West	Mario Sergio; 11,907; 46.71%	Karlene Nation; 2,794; 10.96%	Tom Rakocevic; 9,997; 39.21%	Keith Jarrett; 418; 1.64%		Kayla Baptiste; 267; 1.05%	Wally Schwauss (Ind.); 111; 0.44%	Mario Sergio

=== Hamilton, Burlington & Niagara ===
Electoral district	Candidates							Incumbent
Electoral district	Liberal	PC	NDP	Green	Libertarian	Freedom	Other	Incumbent
Ancaster—Dundas— Flamborough—Westdale	Ted McMeekin; 24,042; 44.56%	Donna Skelly; 18,252; 33.83%	Alex Johnstone; 8,415; 15.60%	Raymond Dartsch; 2,639; 4.89%	Glenn Langton; 423; 0.78%	Barry Spruce; 188; 0.35		Ted McMeekin
Burlington	Eleanor McMahon; 23,573; 43.41%	Jane McKenna; 20,086; 36.98%	Jan Mowbray; 7,792; 14.38%	Meredith Cross; 2,250; 4.14%	Charles Zach; 363; 0.67%	Andrew Brannan; 245; 0.45%		Jane McKenna
Halton	Indira Naidoo-Harris; 33,724; 44.79%	Ted Chudleigh; 27,937; 37.10%	Nik Spohr; 9,758; 12.96%	Susan Farrant; 2,618; 3.48%	Kal Ghory; 916; 1.22%		Gerry Marsh (FCP); 346; 0.46%	Ted Chudleigh
Hamilton Centre	Donna Tiqui-Shebib; 8,450; 23.50%	John Vail; 5,173; 14.39%	**Andrea Horwath**; 18,697; 52.01%	Peter Ormond; 3,067; 8.53%		Peter Melanson; 334; 0.93%	Bob Mann (Comm.); 229; 0.58%	Andrea Horwath
Hamilton East— Stoney Creek	Ivan Luksic; 12,433; 29.16%	David Brown; 7,574; 17.76%	Paul Miller; 19,958; 48.61%	Gregory Zink; 1,742; 4.09%	Mark Burnison; 676; 1.59%	Britney Anne Johnston; 254; 0.60%		Paul Miller
Hamilton Mountain	Javid Mirza; 14,508; 29.57%	Albert Marshall; 8,795; 17.93%	Monique Taylor; 23,066; 46.90%	Greg Lenko; 2,047; 4.17%	Hans Wienhold; 379; 0.77%	Brian Goodwin; 320; 0.65%		Monique Taylor
Niagara Falls	Lionel Tupman; 7,329; 14.39%	Bart Maves; 16,702; 32.80%	Wayne Gates; 24,131; 47.39%	Clarke Bitter; 1,724; 3.39%	Ralph Panucci; 559; 1.10%		John Ringo Beam (NOTA); 478; 0.94%	Wayne Gates
Niagara West—Glanbrook	David Mossey; 15,843; 28.34%	**Tim Hudak**; 23,378; 41.82%	Brian McCormack; 12,423; 22.22%	Basia Krzyzanowski; 3,004; 5.37%	Stefanos Karatopis; 970; 1.74%	Geoff Peacock; 284; 0.51%		Tim Hudak
St. Catharines	Jim Bradley; 19,070; 41.00%	Mat Siscoe; 13,814; 29.70%	Jennie Stevens; 11,350; 24.40%	Karen Fraser; 1,792; 3.85%	Nicholas Dushko; 223; 0.48%	Dave Unrau; 170; 0.30%	Saleh Waziruddin (Comm.); 95; 0.20%	Jim Bradley
Welland	Benoit Mercier; 9,060; 19.85%	Frank Campion; 12,933; 28.33%	Cindy Forster; 21,326; 46.71%	Donna Cridland; 1,874; 4.10%	Andrea J. Murik; 460; 1.01%			Cindy Forster

=== Midwestern Ontario ===
Electoral district	Candidates						Incumbent
Electoral district	Liberal	PC	NDP	Green	Libertarian	Other	Incumbent
Brant	Dave Levac; 19,936; 37.63%	Phil Gillies; 15,447; 29.97%	Alex Felsky; 13,992; 27.15%	Ken Burns; 2,095; 4.06%	Rob Ferguson; 374; 0.73%	Brittni Mitchell (FPO); 180; 0.35%	Dave Levac
Brant	Dave Levac; 19,936; 37.63%	Phil Gillies; 15,447; 29.97%	Alex Felsky; 13,992; 27.15%	Ken Burns; 2,095; 4.06%	Rob Ferguson; 374; 0.73%	**John Turmel** (PPO); 60; 0.12%	Dave Levac
Cambridge	Kathryn McGarry; 18,763; 38.93%	Rob Leone; 15,694; 32.56%	Bobbi Stewart; 10,413; 21.60%	Temara Brown; 2,726; 5.66%	Allan R. Dettweiler; 605; 1.26%		Rob Leone
Guelph	Liz Sandals; 22,014; 41.52%	Anthony MacDonald; 11,048; 20.84%	James Gordon; 9,385; 17.70%	**Mike Schreiner**; 10,230; 19.29%	Blair Smythe; 170; 0.32%	Juanita Burnett (Comm.); 178; 0.34%	Liz Sandals
Haldimand—Norfolk	Karen Robinson; 8,331; 19.72%	Toby Barrett; 22,066; 52.22%	Ian Nichols; 9,786; 23.16%	Anne Faulkner; 2,071; 4.90%			Toby Barrett
Huron—Bruce	Colleen Schenk; 14,647; 30.56%	Lisa Thompson; 18,512; 39.01%	Jan Johnstone; 10,843; 22.85%	Adam Werstine; 1,651; 3.48%	Max Maister; 323; 0.68%	**Dennis Valenta** (EPP); 128; 0.27%	Lisa Thompson
Huron—Bruce	Colleen Schenk; 14,647; 30.56%	Lisa Thompson; 18,512; 39.01%	Jan Johnstone; 10,843; 22.85%	Adam Werstine; 1,651; 3.48%	Max Maister; 323; 0.68%	Andrew Zettel (FCP); 1,353; 2.85%	Lisa Thompson
Kitchener Centre	Daiene Vernile; 18,472; 43.14%	Wayne Wettlaufer; 11,150; 26.98%	Margaret Johnston; 9,765; 22.81%	Ronnie Smith; 2,472; 5.77%	Patrick Bernier; 557; 1.30%		John Milloy†
Kitchener—Conestoga	Wayne Wright; 15,664; 33.40%	Michael Harris; 17,083; 36.43%	James Villeneuve; 9,958; 21.24%	David Weber; 3,277; 6.99%	David Schumm; 1,001; 2.13%		Michael Harris
Kitchener—Waterloo	Jamie Burton; 16,534; 30.14%	Tracey Weiler; 14,450; 26.34%	Catherine Fife; 20,536; 37.43%	Stacey Danckert; 2,859; 5.21%	James Schulz; 481; 0.88%		Catherine Fife
Oxford	Daniel Moulton; 8,736; 21.31%	Ernie Hardeman; 18,958; 46.24%	Bryan Smith; 10,573; 25.79%	Mike Farlow; 1,985; 4.84%	Devin Wright; 365; 0.89%	Tim Hodges (FPO); 384; 0.94%	Ernie Hardeman
Perth—Wellington	Stewart Skinner; 13,585; 33.10%	Randy Pettapiece; 15,992; 38.96%	Romayne Smith Fullerton; 7,764; 18.91%	Chris Desjardins; 2,005; 4.88%	Scott Marshall; 411; 1.00%	Matthew Murphy (Independent), 343; 0.84%	Randy Pettapiece
Perth—Wellington	Stewart Skinner; 13,585; 33.10%	Randy Pettapiece; 15,992; 38.96%	Romayne Smith Fullerton; 7,764; 18.91%	Chris Desjardins; 2,005; 4.88%	Scott Marshall; 411; 1.00%	Irma DeVries (FCP); 746; 1.82%	Randy Pettapiece
Perth—Wellington	Stewart Skinner; 13,585; 33.10%	Randy Pettapiece; 15,992; 38.96%	Romayne Smith Fullerton; 7,764; 18.91%	Chris Desjardins; 2,005; 4.88%	Scott Marshall; 411; 1.00%	Robby Smink (FPO); 202; 0.49%	Randy Pettapiece
Wellington—Halton Hills	Dan Zister; 14,120; 29.32%	Ted Arnott; 22,450; 46.61%	Michael Carlucci; 6,804; 14.13%	Dave Rodgers; 3,550; 7.37%	Jason Cousineau; 1,043; 2.17%	Mitch Sproule (FPO); 198; 0.41%	Ted Arnott

=== Southwestern Ontario ===
Electoral district	Candidates						Incumbent
Electoral district	Liberal	PC	NDP	Green	Libertarian	Other	Incumbent
Chatham-Kent—Essex	Terry Johnson; 9,158; 24.43%	Rick Nicholls; 14,183; 37.83%	Dan Gelinas; 11,664; 31.14%	Ken Bell; 1,971; 5.26%	Douglas McLarty; 514; 3.17%		Rick Nicholls
Elgin—Middlesex—London	Serge Lavoie; 9,183; 20.32%	Jeff Yurek; 20,946; 46.36%	Kathy Cornish; 12,034; 26.63%	John Fisher; 2,236; 4.95%		Clare Maloney (FPO); 784; 1.84%	Jeff Yurek
Essex	Crystal Meloche; 6,628; 14.23%	Ray Cecile; 10,169; 21.82%	Taras Natyshak; 28,118; 60.34%	Mark Vercouteren; 1,685; 3.62%			Taras Natyshak
Lambton—Kent—Middlesex	Mike Radan; 9,298; 20.28%	Monte McNaughton; 20,710; 45.17%	Joe Hill; 12,160; 26.52%	James Armstrong; 2,104; 4.59%	Matt Willson; 207; 0.45%	Dave Durnin (FPO); 242; 0.53%	Monte McNaughton
Lambton—Kent—Middlesex	Mike Radan; 9,298; 20.28%	Monte McNaughton; 20,710; 45.17%	Joe Hill; 12,160; 26.52%	James Armstrong; 2,104; 4.59%	Matt Willson; 207; 0.45%	Bob Lewis (NOTA); 558; 1.22%	Monte McNaughton
Lambton—Kent—Middlesex	Mike Radan; 9,298; 20.28%	Monte McNaughton; 20,710; 45.17%	Joe Hill; 12,160; 26.52%	James Armstrong; 2,104; 4.59%	Matt Willson; 207; 0.45%	Marinus Vander Vloet (FCP); 568; 1.24%	Monte McNaughton
London—Fanshawe	Marcel Marcellin; 7,066; 19.90%	Chris Robson; 8,196; 23.08%	Teresa Armstrong; 17,903; 50.42%	Wil Sorrell; 1,378; 3.88%	Tim Harnick; 386; 1.09%	**Paul McKeever** (FPO); 467; 1.32%	Teresa Armstrong
London—Fanshawe	Marcel Marcellin; 7,066; 19.90%	Chris Robson; 8,196; 23.08%	Teresa Armstrong; 17,903; 50.42%	Wil Sorrell; 1,378; 3.88%	Tim Harnick; 386; 1.09%	Ali Aref Hamadi (Ind.); 112; 0.32%	Teresa Armstrong
London North Centre	Deb Matthews; 16,379; 35.98%	Nancy Branscombe; 12,016; 26.40%	Judy Bryant; 13,853; 29.84%	Kevin Labonte; 2,445; 5.37%		Dave McKee (Comm.); 115; 0.25%	Deb Matthews
London North Centre	Deb Matthews; 16,379; 35.98%	Nancy Branscombe; 12,016; 26.40%	Judy Bryant; 13,853; 29.84%	Kevin Labonte; 2,445; 5.37%		Salim Mansur (FPO); 639; 1.40%	Deb Matthews
London North Centre	Deb Matthews; 16,379; 35.98%	Nancy Branscombe; 12,016; 26.40%	Judy Bryant; 13,853; 29.84%	Kevin Labonte; 2,445; 5.37%		Michael Spottiswood (PPO); 70; 0.15%	Deb Matthews
London West	Nick Steinburg; 13,070; 23.72%	Jeff Bennett; 16,295; 29.57%	Peggy Sattler; 22,243; 40.36%	Keith McAlister; 2,310; 4.19%		Al Gretzky (FPO); 1,188; 2.16%	Peggy Sattler
Sarnia—Lambton	Anne Marie Gillis; 8,152; 17.56%	Bob Bailey; 18,722; 41.01%	Brian White; 16,327; 35.76%	Kevin Shaw; 2,109; 4.62%	Andrew K. Falby; 340; 0.74%		Bob Bailey
Windsor—Tecumseh	Jason Dupuis; 5,599; 15.25%	Brandon Wright; 2,118; 5.77%	Percy Hatfield; 22,818; 62.16%	Adam Wright; 5,493; 14.96%	Timothy Joel Marshall; 682; 1.86%		Percy Hatfield
Windsor West	Teresa Piruzza; 14,001; 38.54%	Henry Lau; 5,225; 14.38%	Lisa Gretzky; 15,043; 41.40%	Chad Durocher; 1,171; 3.22%		Helmi Charif (Ind.); 891; 2.45%	Teresa Piruzza

=== Northern Ontario ===
==== Northeastern Ontario ====
Electoral district	Candidates						Incumbent
Electoral district	Liberal	PC	NDP	Green	Libertarian	Other	Incumbent
Algoma—Manitoulin	Craig Hughson; 6,504; 24.51%	Jib Turner; 4,589; 17.30%	Michael Mantha; 14,171; 53.41%	Alexandra Zalucky; 828; 3.12%	Richard Hadidian; 441; 1.66%		Michael Mantha
Nickel Belt	James Tregonning; 7,031; 21.90%	Marck Blay; 3,827; 11.92%	France Gélinas; 20,104; 62.62%	Heather K. Dahlstrom; 1,145; 3.57%			France Gélinas
Nipissing	Catherine Whiting; 8,232; 26.78%	Vic Fedeli; 13,085; 41.81%	Henri Giroux; 8,057; 25.74%	Nicole L. Peltier; 1,188; 3.80%	Derek Elliott; 377; 1.20%	Patrick Clement (Ind.); 208; 0.66%	Vic Fedeli
Parry Sound—Muskoka	Dan Waters; 10,158; 26.25%	Norm Miller; 15,761; 40.73%	Clyde Mobbley; 4,999; 12.92%	Matt Richter; 7,484; 19.34%		Andy Stivrins (FPO); 296; 0.76%	Norm Miller
Sault Ste. Marie	David Orazietti; 17,490; 58.53%	Rod Fremlin; 3,704; 12.39%	Celia Ross; 7,610; 25.47%	Kara Flannigan; 965; 3.23%	Austin Williams; 115; 0.38%		David Orazietti
Sudbury	Andrew Olivier; 13,296; 39.35%	Paula Peroni; 4,663; 13.80%	Joe Cimino; 14,274; 42.24%	Casey J. Lalonde; 1,212; 3.59%	Steve Wilson; 243; 0.72%	J. David Popescu (Ind.); 105; 0.31%	Rick Bartolucci†
Timiskaming—Cochrane	Sébastien Goyer; 6,134; 23.21%	Peter Politis; 4,527; 17.13%	John Vanthof; 14,661; 55.48%	Cody Fraser; 489; 1.85%		Gino Chitaroni (NOTA); 615; 2.33%	John Vanthof
Timmins—James Bay	Sylvie Fontaine; 5,527; 24.06%	Steve Black; 5,226; 22.75%	Gilles Bisson; 11,756; 51.18%	Bozena Hrycyna; 403; 1.75%		Fauzia Sadiq (COR); 60; 0.26%	Gilles Bisson

==== Northwestern Ontario ====
Electoral district	Candidates						Incumbent
Electoral district	Liberal	PC	NDP	Green	Libertarian	Northern Ontario Heritage	Incumbent
Kenora—Rainy River	Anthony Leek; 3,652; 15.77%	Randy Nickle; 5,905; 25.05%	Sarah Campbell; 12,889; 55.66%	Timothy McKillop; 711; 3.07%			Sarah Campbell
Thunder Bay—Atikokan	Bill Mauro; 15,176; 52.98%	Harold Wilson; 3,779; 13.19%	Mary Kozorys; 8,052; 28.11%	John Northey; 964; 3.37%	Joe Talarico; 547; 1.91%	**Ed Deibel**; 129; 0.45%	Bill Mauro
Thunder Bay—Superior North	Michael Gravelle; 15,519; 55.97%	Derek Parks; 1,991; 7.18%	Andrew Foulds; 8,169; 29.46%	Joseph LeBlanc; 997; 3.60%	Tamara Johnson; 922; 3.33%	Paul Sloan; 127; 0.46%	Michael Gravelle

== See also ==
- Independent candidates, 2014 Ontario provincial election
- Progressive Conservative Party of Ontario candidates in the 2014 Ontario provincial election
