= Independent candidates in the 2014 Ontario provincial election =

There were a number of independent candidates in the 2014 Ontario provincial election, none of whom were elected. Some of these candidates have their own biography pages; information on others may be found here.

== Candidates ==
=== Glengarry—Prescott—Russell: Marc-Antoine Gagnier ===
2014 Ontario general election: Glengarry—Prescott—Russell
Party	Candidate	Votes	%	±%
Liberal	Grant Crack	23,565	49.74	+6.56
Progressive Conservative	Roxane Villeneuve Robertson	15,429	32.57	−7.19
New Democratic	Isabelle Sabourin	5,902	12.46	−1.88
Green	Raymond St. Martin	1,528	3.23	+1.31
Libertarian	Darcy Neal Donnelly	422	0.89	+0.39
Independent	Marc-Antoine Gagnier	296	0.62	–
Freedom	Carl Leduc	233	0.49	+0.08
Total valid votes		47,375	100.0	+17.74
Liberal hold		Swing		+6.88
Source(s) Elections Ontario (2014). "Official result from the records – 026, Glengarry—Prescott—Russell" (PDF).

=== Mississauga—Brampton South: Robert Alilovic ===
2014 Ontario general election: Mississauga—Brampton South
Party	Candidate	Votes	%	±%
Liberal	Amrit Mangat	19,923	48.21	+2.17
Progressive Conservative	Amarjeet Gill	11,251	27.23	-3.17
New Democratic	Kevin Troake	6,906	16.71	+0.69
Green	Kathy Acheson	1,302	3.15	-0.53
Libertarian	Richard Levesque	993	2.40	+0.36
None of the Above	Kathleen Vezina	597	1.44	–
Independent	Robert Alilovic	351	0.85	–
Total valid votes		41,323	100.0	
Liberal hold		Swing		+2.67
Source: Elections Ontario

=== Peterborough: Brian Martindale ===
2014 Ontario general election: Peterborough
Party	Candidate	Votes	%	±%
Liberal	Jeff Leal	24,649	46.26	+6.33
Progressive Conservative	Scott Stewart	15,909	29.86	−1.63
New Democratic	Sheila Wood	9,726	18.25	−7.36
Green	Gary Beamish	2,285	4.29	+1.75
Independent	Brian Martindale	395	0.74	
Socialist	Andrea Quiano	131	0.25	+0.08
Freedom	Wayne Matheson	121	0.23	−0.03
Pauper	Gerard Faux	63	0.19	
Total valid votes		53,279	100.00	
Liberal hold		Swing		+3.98
Source: Elections Ontario

=== Renfrew—Nipissing—Pembroke: Chad Beckwith-Smith ===
2014 Ontario general election: Renfrew—Nipissing—Pembroke
Party	Candidate	Votes	%	±%
Progressive Conservative	John Yakabuski	25,241	61.06	-9.72
Liberal	Rod Boileau	7,897	19.10	+3.12
New Democratic	Brian Dougherty	5,978	14.46	+3.49
Green	Benjamin Wright	1,337	3.23	+1.76
Confederation of Regions	Murray Reid	489	1.19	+0.40
Independent	Chad Beckwith-Smith	392	0.95	
Total valid votes		41,334	100.00	
Progressive Conservative hold		Swing		-6.42
Source: Elections Ontario

=== Sudbury: J. David Popescu ===
2014 Ontario general election: Sudbury
Party	Candidate	Votes	%	±%
New Democratic	Joe Cimino	14,247	42.24	+1.51
Liberal	Andrew Olivier	13,267	39.34	−3.03
Progressive Conservative	Paula Peroni	4,653	13.80	+0.23
Green	Casey J. Lalonde	1,211	3.59	+0.91
Libertarian	Steven Wilson	242	0.72	
Independent	J. David Popescu	105	0.31	+0.17
Total valid votes		33,725	100.00	+4.03
New Democratic gain from Liberal		Swing		+2.27
Source(s) "General Election Results by District, 088 Sudbury". Elections Ontario. 2014.
