= Progressive Conservative Party of Ontario candidates in the 2014 Ontario provincial election =

The Progressive Conservative Party of Ontario is one of the three largest political parties in Ontario, along with the Ontario NDP and the Liberal Party of Ontario running in the 2014 Ontario general election. It has served as the Official Opposition since 2003, having previously formed two successive majority governments in 1995 and 1999.

The party named 107 candidates. Two of which had resigned. and one was fired. The leader of the party was Tim Hudak.

Riding	Candidate's Name	Notes	Residence	Occupation	Votes	%	Rank
Ajax—Pickering	Todd McCarthy			Lawyer	14,999	29.17	2
Algoma—Manitoulin	Jib Turner				4,589	17.30	3
Ancaster—Dundas—Flamborough—Westdale	Donna Skelly		Ancaster	Journalist	18,252	33.83	2
Barrie	Rod Jackson	Incumbent MPP	Barrie	Human Resources Manager	17,667	36.10	2
Beaches—East York	Nicolas Johnson		Toronto	IT Consultant	5,982	13.93	3
Bramalea—Gore—Malton	Harjit Jaswal		Brampton	Real Estate Agent, Teacher	9,403	17.72	3
Brampton—Springdale	Pam Hundal	Party Vice-President	Brampton	Lawyer	10,117	23.95	3
Brampton West	Randeep Sandhu		Brampton	Business Owner	13,363	24.34	2
Brant	Phil Gillies	Former MPP	Brantford	Consultant	15,447	29.97	2
Bruce—Grey—Owen Sound	Bill Walker	Incumbent MPP	Hepworth	Nuclear Operations Manager	20,359	47.55	1
Burlington	Jane McKenna	Incumbent MPP	Burlington	Consultant	20,086	36.98	2
Cambridge	Rob Leone	Incumbent MPP	Cambridge	Professor	15,694	32.56	2
Carleton—Mississippi Mills	Jack MacLaren	Incumbent MPP	Ottawa	Engineer, Farmer	30,590	47.49	1
Chatham-Kent—Essex	Rick Nicholls	Incumbent MPP	Chatham-Kent	Development Organizer	14,183	37.83	1
Davenport	Lan Daniel		Toronto	Electronic Technician	2,665	7.47	3
Don Valley East	Angela Kennedy	Super Caucus Chair	Toronto	Endocrinologist, School Trustee	9,257	26.8	2
Don Valley West	David Porter		Toronto	Chartered Accountant	14,082	30.63	2
Dufferin—Caledon	Sylvia Jones	Caucus Chair, Incumbent MPP	Orangeville		18,017	39.86	1
Durham	Mike Patrick				18,640	34.29	2
Eglinton—Lawrence	Robin Martin		Toronto	Lawyer	14,709	35.27	2
Elgin—Middlesex—London	Jeff Yurek	Incumbent MPP	St. Thomas	Pharmacist, Teacher	20,946	46.36	1
Essex	Ray Cecile				10,169	21.82	2
Etobicoke Centre	Pina Martino		Toronto	Judge, Lawyer, Political Advisor	15,520	32.72	2
Etobicoke—Lakeshore	Doug Holyday	Incumbent MPP	Toronto	Mayor, City Councillor	17,587	34.35	2
Etobicoke North	Tony Milone				6,163	22.74	3
Glengarry—Prescott—Russell	Roxanne Villeneuve Robertson		Glengarry	Political Staffer	15,429	32.57	2
Guelph	Anthony MacDonald				11,048	20.84	2
Haldimand—Norfolk	Toby Barrett	Incumbent MPP	Norfolk	Teacher	22,066	52.22	1
Haliburton—Kawartha Lakes—Brock	Laurie Scott	Incumbent MPP		Nurse	21,641	41.09	1
Halton	Ted Chudleigh	Incumbent MPP		Agriculturalist	27,937	37.1	2
Hamilton Centre	John Vail		Hamilton	Accountant	5,173	14.39	3
Hamilton East—Stoney Creek	David Brown {{{last}}}				7,574	17.76	3
Hamilton Mountain	Albert Marshall {{{last}}}				8,795	17.93	3
Huron—Bruce	Lisa Thompson	Incumbent MPP		Rural Advisor	18,512	39.01	1
Kenora—Rainy River	Randy Nickel		Kenora	Business Owner	5,905	25.05	2
Kingston and the Islands	Mark Bain		Kingston	Archaeologist	10,652	21.26	3
Kitchener Centre	Wayne Wettlaufer	Former MPP	Kitchener	Insurance Broker	11,150	26.98	2
Kitchener—Conestoga	Michael Harris	Incumbent MPP	Kitchener	Business Development Manager	17,083	36.43	1
Kitchener—Waterloo	Tracey Weiler		Waterloo	Consultant	14,450	26.34	3
Lambton—Kent—Middlesex	Monte McNaughton	Incumbent MPP		Mall Operator, Town Councillor	20,710	45.17	1
Lanark—Frontenac—Lennox and Addington	Randy Hillier	Incumbent MPP	Lanark	Electrician	21,966	43.52	1
Leeds—Grenville	Steve Clark	Incumbent MPP	Brockville	Mayor	23,523	56.07	1
London—Fanshawe	Chris Robson		London	Veterinarian	8,196	23.08	2
London North Centre	Nancy Branscombe		London	City Councillor	12,016	26.4	3
London West	Jeff Bennett		London	Lawyer, Lecturer	16,295	29.57	2
Markham—Unionville	Shan Thayaparan		Markham	Real Estate Agent	14,241	33.98	2
Mississauga—Brampton South	Amarjeet Gill				11,251	27.23	2
Mississauga East—Cooksville	Zoran Churchin				10,479	26.2	2
Mississauga—Erindale	Jeff White				15,474	29.89	2
Mississauga South	Effie Triantafilopodadis				14,514	33.2	2
Mississauga—Streetsville	Nina Tangri				12,060	28.07	2
Nepean—Carleton	Lisa MacLeod	Incumbent MPP	Ottawa	Political Advisor	30,901	46.77	1
Newmarket—Aurora	Jane Twinney		Newmarket	Town Councillor	19,585	37.42	2
Niagara Falls	Bart Maves	Former MPP	Niagara Falls	City Councillor	16,702	32.8	2
Niagara West—Glanbrook	Tim Hudak	Party Leader, Incumbent MPP			23,378	41.82	1
Nickel Belt	Marck Blay				3,827	11.92	3
Nipissing	Vic Fedeli	Incumbent MPP		Mayor	13,085	41.81	1
Northumberland—Quinte West	Rob Milligan	Incumbent MPP		Teacher	19,583	35.93	2
Oak Ridges—Markham	Farid Wassef			Pharmacist	30,256	37.47	2
Oakville	Larry Scott				18,921	37.81	2
Oshawa	Jerry Ouellette	Incumbent MPP		National Sales Coordinator	14,540	30.54	2
Ottawa Centre	Rob Dekker				9,678	18.18	3
Ottawa—Orléans	Andrew Lister				18,525	33.14	2
Ottawa South	Matt Young				15,235	32.11	2
Ottawa Vanier	Martin Forget				8,750	22.29	2
Ottawa West—Nepean	Randall Denley				15,895	33.89	2
Oxford	Ernie Hardeman	Incumbent MPP			18,958	46.24	1
Parkdale—High Park	Jamie Ellerton				5,787	12.83	3
Parry Sound—Muskoka	Norm Miller	Incumbent MPP			15,761	40.73	1
Perth—Wellington	Randy Pettapiece	Incumbent MPP			15,992	38.96	1
Peterborough	Scott Stewart				15,907	29.8	2
Pickering—Scarborough East	Kevin Gaudet			Communications Expert	12,638	28.30	2
Prince Edward—Hastings	Todd Smith	Incumbent MPP		Radio Broadcaster	19,281	41.72	1
Renfrew—Nipissing—Pembroke	John Yakabuski	Incumbent MPP			25,241	61.07	1
Richmond Hill	Vic Gupta			Consultant	15,642	36.54	2
St. Catharines	Matt Siscoe				13,814	29.7	2
St. Paul's	Rocco Achampong			Lawyer	12,037	23.95	2
Sarnia—Lambton	Bob Bailey	Incumbent MPP			18,722	41.01	1
Sault Ste. Marie	Rod Fremlin				3,704	12.39	3
Scarborough—Agincourt	Liang Chen			Dean, Professor	12,041	34.63	2
Scarborough Centre	David Ramalho				7,599	21.58	2
Scarborough—Guildwood	Ken Kirupa			Banker, Real Estate Agent	9,721	28.01	2
Scarborough—Rouge River	Raymond Cho			City Councillor	11,500	27.66	3
Scarborough Southwest	Nita Kang			Real Estate Agent	7,573	20.65	3
Simcoe—Grey	Jim Wilson	Incumbent MPP			25,988	47.12	1
Simcoe North	Garfield Dunlop	Incumbent MPP			22,179	43.96	1
Stormont—Dundas—South Glengarry	Jim McDonell	Incumbent MPP			20,624	51.73	1
Sudbury	Paula Peroni				4,663	13.8	3
Thornhill	Gila Martow	Incumbent MPP		Optometrist	21,886	43.99	1
Thunder Bay—Atikokan	Harold Wilson				3,779	13.19	3
Thunder Bay—Superior North	Tamara Johnson				1,991	7.18	3
Timiskaming—Cochrane	Peter Politis				4,527	17.13	3
Timmins—James Bay	Steve Black				5,226	22.75	3
Toronto Centre	Martin Abell				9,498	18.55	2
Toronto—Danforth	Naomi Solomon			Lawyer	4,304	10.01	3
Trinity—Spadina	Roberta Scott			Paramedic	8,035	13.99	3
Vaughan	Peter Meffe				16,989	28.17	2
Welland	Frank Campion				12,933	28.33	2
Wellington—Halton Hills	Ted Arnott	Incumbent MPP			22,450	46.61	1
Whitby—Oshawa	Christine Elliott	Deputy Leader, Incumbent MPP		Lawyer	24,027	40.65	1
Willowdale	Michael Ceci		Toronto	Digital Media Consultant	15,468	33.47	2
Windsor—Tecumseh	Robert De Verteuil				2,118	5.77	4
Windsor West	Henry Lau				5,225	14.38	3
York Centre	Avi Yufest			Political Advisor	11,125	31.46	2
York—Simcoe	Julia Munro	Incumbent MPP		Teacher	19,025	40.4	1
York South—Weston	Andrew Ffrench				3,687	11.26	3
York West	Karlene Nation				2,794	10.96	3
