= Mississauga—Malton =

Mississauga—Malton could refer to:

- Mississauga—Malton (federal electoral district)
- Mississauga—Malton (provincial electoral district)
