= Deepak Anand =

Canadian politician

Deepak Anand MPP
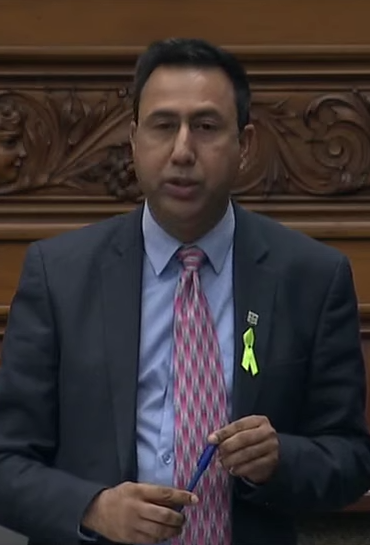

Member of the Ontario Provincial Parliament for Mississauga—Malton
- Incumbent
- Assumed office June 7, 2018
- Preceded by: Riding Established

Personal details
- Born: Patiala, India
- Party: Progressive Conservative
- Spouse: Aruna Anand
- Children: 2
- Education: Panjab University, Schulich School of Business
- Occupation: Small business owner, Radio Show Host, Community Activist
- Website: https://www.deepakanandmpp.ca/

Deepak Anand MPP is a Canadian politician, who was elected to the Legislative Assembly of Ontario in the 2018 provincial election. Anand is a chemical engineer from Panjab University in India and earned his MBA degree from the Schulich School of Business in Canada. He represents the riding of Mississauga—Malton as a member of the Progressive Conservative Party of Ontario. He is the Parliamentary Assistant to the Minister of Colleges, Universities, Research Excellence and Security and a Member of the Standing Committee on Heritage, Infrastructure and Cultural Policy.

== Early life, family and education ==
Born in Patiala, Punjab, India, Anand went to Panjab University for Chemical Engineering and worked in India before immigrating to Canada in 2000. He started his working life as a lab technician at an automotive factory. He was promoted to Quality Manager within the automotive industry. He then studied for a Master of Business Administration from the Schulich School of Business before working as a Financial Analyst at Morguard . He then acquired a small company that distributed automotive parts around the country.

== Electoral record ==
2025 Ontario general election: Mississauga—Malton
| Party | Candidate | Votes | % | ±% |
|---|---|---|---|---|
| Progressive Conservative | Deepak Anand | 15,117 | 50.94 | +6.05 |
| Liberal | Jawad Haroon | 11,499 | 38.75 | +8.30 |
| New Democratic | Gerard McDonald | 2,000 | 6.74 | –10.97 |
| Green | Arish Esmail | 561 | 1.89 | –2.15 |
| New Blue | Van Nguyen | 498 | 1.68 | –1.23 |
| Total valid votes | | 29,675 | 99.53 | |
| Total rejected, unmarked and declined ballots | | 139 | 0.47 | –0.25 |
| Turnout | | 29,814 | 36.70 | +0.18 |
| Eligible voters | | 81,246 | | |
| Progressive Conservative hold | | Swing | | +7.17 |
Source: Elections Ontario

2022 Ontario general election: Mississauga—Malton
| Party | Candidate | Votes | % | ±% |
|---|---|---|---|---|
| Progressive Conservative | Deepak Anand | 13,028 | 44.89 | +5.77 |
| Liberal | Aman Gill | 8,838 | 30.45 | +9.68 |
| New Democratic | Waseem Ahmed | 5,140 | 17.71 | –15.13 |
| Green | Robert Chan | 1,173 | 4.04 | +2.25 |
| New Blue | Van Nguyen | 844 | 2.91 | – |
| Total valid votes | | 29,023 | 99.28 | |
| Total rejected, unmarked and declined ballots | | 210 | 0.72 | –0.10 |
| Turnout | | 29,233 | 36.51 | –11.86 |
| Eligible voters | | 80,059 | | |
| Progressive Conservative hold | | Swing | | –1.95 |
Source: Elections Ontario

2018 Ontario general election: Mississauga—Malton
| Party | Candidate | Votes | % | ±% |
|---|---|---|---|---|
| Progressive Conservative | Deepak Anand | 14,712 | 39.12 | +18.63 |
| New Democratic | Nikki Clarke | 12,351 | 32.84 | +9.55 |
| Liberal | Amrit Mangat | 7,813 | 20.77 | –26.82 |
| Independent | Caroline Roach | 1,187 | 3.16 | – |
| Green | Eryn Sylvester | 674 | 1.79 | –0.95 |
| Libertarian | Michelle Ciupka | 657 | 1.75 | – |
| None of the Above | Alex Vezina | 217 | 0.58 | – |
| Total valid votes | | 37,611 | 99.18 | |
| Total rejected, unmarked and declined ballots | | 312 | 0.82 | |
| Turnout | | 37,923 | 48.37 | |
| Eligible voters | | 78,394 | | |
| Progressive Conservative notional gain from Liberal | | Swing | | ▲22.73 |
Source: Elections Ontario
