= Jeremy Roberts (politician) =

Canadian politician (born 1991)

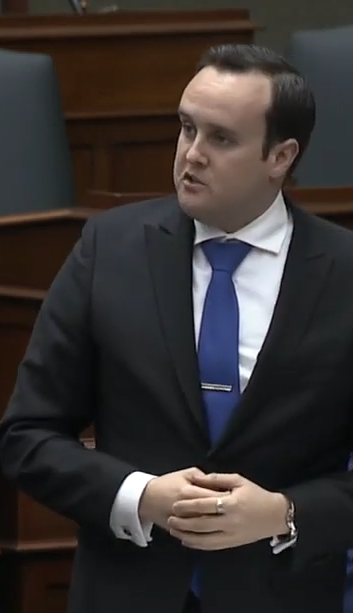

Parliamentary Assistant to the Minister of Children, Community and Social Services (Community and Social Services)
- In office June 26, 2019 – May 3, 2022
- Minister: Todd Smith; Merrilee Fullerton
- Preceded by: Belinda Karahalios

Member of the Ontario Provincial Parliament for Ottawa West—Nepean
- In office June 7, 2018 – May 3, 2022
- Preceded by: Bob Chiarelli
- Succeeded by: Chandra Pasma

Personal details
- Born: November 10, 1991 (age 34) Ottawa, Ontario, Canada
- Party: Progressive Conservative (provincial); Conservative (federal)
- Domestic partner: John
- Education: Carleton University, University of Oxford
- Occupation: Political aide

Jeremy Roberts (born November 10, 1991) is a former MPP Ottawa West—Nepean. He was first elected in the 2018 provincial election. In the 2022 Ontario general election, he was defeated by NDP candidate Chandra Pasma by 1,086 votes and was the only incumbent MPP from the Progressive Conservative Party of Ontario to be defeated that election.

Roberts credits his decision to enter politics to his brother who has autism. Prior and during his time in office, Roberts was a strong advocate for supporting individuals with autism and raising funds for the Children's Hospital of Eastern Ontario.

Prior to being elected, Roberts served as a political assistant to former federal Finance Minister Jim Flaherty and MP Dan Albas.

== Political activism & career ==
Roberts has been involved in politics since the 2007 Ontario general election, in which he volunteered for the Progressive Conservatives led by John Tory. He volunteered in the 2011 and 2014 Ontario general election for the party led by Tim Hudak. His last election in which he volunteered prior to becoming a candidate was the 2015 Canadian federal election for the Conservatives, led by then-Prime Minister Stephen Harper.

During the nomination process for the Progressive Conservatives during the 2018 Ontario general election in Ottawa West-Nepean, Roberts had initially lost the nomination but interim leader Vic Fedeli overturned the nomination of MacGregor. Roberts re-entered the race and was acclaimed the nominee in March.

Roberts won the election in Ottawa West-Nepean by 176 votes over the NDP candidate Chandra Pasma. As there was no recount challenge made by Pasma, Roberts was formally declared to be elected in the riding.

On June 26, 2019, Roberts was appointed by Premier Doug Ford to serve as the Parliamentary Assistant to Minister of Children, Community and Social Services Todd Smith for Community and Social Services.

On October 6, 2020, Roberts introduced Bill 214 to the Ontario Legislature. If enacted, the bill would enact that, synchronously with New York and Quebec should they pass similar laws, Ontario stay on Daylight Time (DT) year-round. On November 25, 2020, the bill was passed with unanimous support in the Legislature.

== Personal life ==
Roberts lives in Ottawa. His mother is a nurse and his father is the manager of the Almonte General Hospital Foundation. He has a younger brother with autism. After completing high school at Canterbury High School, he attended Carleton University for political science and the University of Oxford, where he attained his Master of Public Policy from the Blavatnik School of Government.

Roberts is openly gay, coming out in a column post for the Ottawa Citizen on March 15, 2022.

== Electoral record ==
2022 Ontario general election: Ottawa West—Nepean
Party	Candidate	Votes	%	±%	Expenditures
New Democratic	Chandra Pasma	15,696	37.54	+5.06	$125,025
Progressive Conservative	Jeremy Roberts	14,610	34.94	+2.12	$90,418
Liberal	Sam Bhalesar	9,384	22.44	−6.86	$67,587
Green	Steven Warren	1,475	3.53	−0.30	$4,298
Ontario Party	Vilteau Delvas	649	1.55		$5,110
Total valid votes/expense limit		41,814	98.58	-0.34	$127,707
Total rejected, unmarked, and declined ballots		601	1.42	+0.34	
Turnout		42,415	47.42	-9.62	
Eligible voters		91,223			
New Democratic gain from Progressive Conservative		Swing		+1.47	
Source(s): "Summary of Valid Votes Cast for Each Candidate" (PDF). Elections Ontario. 2022. Archived from the original on 2023-05-18.; "Statistical Summary by Electoral District" (PDF). Elections Ontario. 2022. Archived from the original on 2023-05-21.

2018 Ontario general election: Ottawa West—Nepean
Party	Candidate	Votes	%	±%
Progressive Conservative	Jeremy Roberts	16,590	32.82	−1.06
New Democratic	Chandra Pasma	16,415	32.48	+18.06
Liberal	Bob Chiarelli	14,810	29.30	−15.54
Green	Pat Freel	1,937	3.83	−2.35
None of the Above	Colin A. Pritchard	542	1.07	
Libertarian	Nicholas Paliga	251	0.50	-0.18
Total valid votes		50,545	98.92	
Total rejected, unmarked and declined ballots		552	1.08	-0.43
Turnout		51,097	57.04	+1.10
Eligible voters		89,575		
Progressive Conservative gain from Liberal		Swing		+7.24
Source: Elections Ontario

== Government positions ==
Ford ministry, Province of Ontario (2018–present)
Special Parliamentary Responsibilities
Predecessor	Title	Successor
Belinda Karahalios	Parliamentary Assistant to the Minister of Children, Community and Social Services; Responsible for Community and Social Services; June 26, 2019 – May 3, 2022	Incumbent
