= Chandra Pasma =

Canadian politician (born 1979)

Chandra Pasma MPP
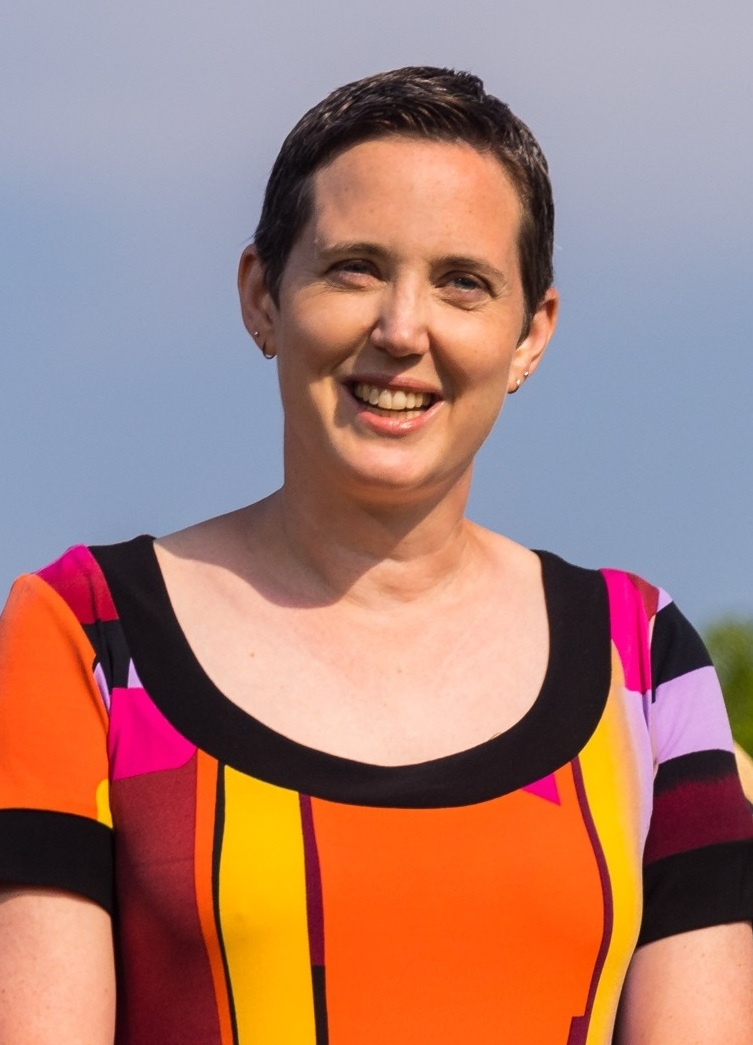
- Pasma in 2022

Member of the Ontario Provincial Parliament for Ottawa West—Nepean
- Incumbent
- Assumed office June 2, 2022
- Preceded by: Jeremy Roberts

Critic, Poverty, Homelessness Reduction, and Education
- Incumbent
- Assumed office July 13, 2022
- Leader: Peter Tabuns (interim) Marit Stiles

Personal details
- Born: September 7, 1979 (age 46)
- Party: Ontario New Democratic Party
- Spouse: Matt Helleman
- Children: 3
- Occupation: Researcher/Policy Analyst

Chandra Pasma (born September 7, 1979) is a Canadian politician, who was elected to the Legislative Assembly of Ontario in the 2022 provincial election. She represents the district of Ottawa West—Nepean as a member of the Ontario New Democratic Party.

== Background ==
Before her election as MPP for Ottawa West—Nepean, Pasma worked as a public policy researcher for the Canadian Union of Public Employees (CUPE). Her published research included an investigation into state of paramedic services in Ontario, and the rising use of contract labour in Canadian universities.

She also previously served as an advisor to the federal New Democratic Party.

Pasma has also worked for Citizens for Public Justice, and prior to that worked for Conservative MP Dave MacKenzie until 2006.

== Political career ==
Pasma first ran for political office in the 2018 Ontario election in Ottawa West—Nepean. Although she was narrowly defeated by Jeremy Roberts, it was then the ONDP's strongest result in the constituency.

In the 2022 election, Pasma and Roberts would have a rematch of their 2018 contest. This time, she was elected with 15,696 votes (37.54%), marking the first time the Ontario NDP had won the constituency. Pasma was also the only candidate in Ontario who defeated an incumbent conservative in what was otherwise a successful election for the ruling Progressive Conservative Party. Her campaign emphasized access to healthcare and housing affordability.

In September 2022, Pasma criticized the government for providing insufficient income support to the disabled. That month she published an op-ed in the Ottawa Citizen as part of her campaign to increase the Ontario Disability Support Program.

On July 13, 2022 Pasma was named as the Official Opposition critic for poverty and homelessness reduction by interim ONDP leader Peter Tabuns. She was later made education critic after Marit Stiles resigned to run for the 2023 Ontario New Democratic Party leadership election. In this role, Pasma has criticized the Progressive Conservative government for underfunding education as well as for poor air and water quality in school buildings. In October 2023, she co-sponsored Bill 140, which aimed to improve air quality in daycares and schools. She has also advocated for resources to address growing violence in schools.

On November 23, 2022 Pasma put forward a private member's bill, Protecting Human Rights in an Emergency Act which would require apartment buildings to possess emergency generators capable of powering water pumps and elevators. The bill was prompted by the impacts of the May 2022 Canadian derecho in Ottawa; which left many apartment residents without water for over ten days, and trapped residents with mobility issues. The bill was defeated on second reading by a vote of 30-66; being opposed by the majority Progressive Conservative government.

In the 2023 Ontario New Democratic Party leadership election Pasma endorsed Marit Stiles in her successful bid for leadership of the party; replacing outgoing leader Andrea Horwath.

On December 4, 2023, Pasma was among 333 Canadians permanently banned from entering the Russian Federation. This was as a consequence of Pasma's support of Canadian sanctions against Russia, in response to the Russian invasion of Ukraine.

Pasma endorsed Alberta MP Heather McPherson in the 2026 New Democratic Party leadership election.

== Electoral record ==
2025 Ontario general election: Ottawa West—Nepean
Party	Candidate	Votes	%	±%	Expenditures
New Democratic	Chandra Pasma	20,087	49.33	+11.79	$79,106
Progressive Conservative	Husien Abu-Rayash	11,697	28.72	–6.22	$59,137
Liberal	Brett Szmul	7,229	17.75	–4.69	$13,733
Green	Sophia Andrew-Joiner	976	2.40	–1.13	$0
New Blue	Rylan Vroom	733	1.80	N/A	$0
Total valid votes/expense limit		40,722	99.34	+0.76	$146,145
Total rejected, unmarked, and declined ballots		271	0.66	–0.76	
Turnout		40,993	45.32	–2.10	
Eligible voters		90,450			
New Democratic hold		Swing		+9.01	
Source(s): "Vote Totals From Official Tabulation" (PDF). Elections Ontario. 2025-03-02.

2022 Ontario general election: Ottawa West—Nepean
Party	Candidate	Votes	%	±%	Expenditures
New Democratic	Chandra Pasma	15,696	37.54	+5.06	$125,025
Progressive Conservative	Jeremy Roberts	14,610	34.94	+2.12	$90,418
Liberal	Sam Bhalesar	9,384	22.44	−6.86	$67,587
Green	Steven Warren	1,475	3.53	−0.30	$4,298
Ontario Party	Vilteau Delvas	649	1.55		$5,110
Total valid votes/expense limit		41,814	98.58	-0.34	$127,707
Total rejected, unmarked, and declined ballots		601	1.42	+0.34	
Turnout		42,415	47.42	-9.62	
Eligible voters		91,223			
New Democratic gain from Progressive Conservative		Swing		+1.47	
Source(s): "Summary of Valid Votes Cast for Each Candidate" (PDF). Elections Ontario. 2022. Archived from the original on 2023-05-18.; "Statistical Summary by Electoral District" (PDF). Elections Ontario. 2022. Archived from the original on 2023-05-21.

2018 Ontario general election: Ottawa West—Nepean
Party	Candidate	Votes	%	±%
Progressive Conservative	Jeremy Roberts	16,590	32.82	−1.06
New Democratic	Chandra Pasma	16,415	32.48	+18.06
Liberal	Bob Chiarelli	14,810	29.30	−15.54
Green	Pat Freel	1,937	3.83	−2.35
None of the Above	Colin A. Pritchard	542	1.07	
Libertarian	Nicholas Paliga	251	0.50	-0.18
Total valid votes		50,545	98.92	
Total rejected, unmarked and declined ballots		552	1.08	-0.43
Turnout		51,097	57.04	+1.10
Eligible voters		89,575		
Progressive Conservative gain from Liberal		Swing		+7.24
Source: Elections Ontario
