= Amarjeet Gill =

Canadian politician

Amarjeet Gill MP

Member of Parliament for Brampton West
- Incumbent
- Assumed office April 28, 2025
- Preceded by: Kamal Khera

Personal details
- Born: Amarjeet Singh Gill; 1967 or 1968 (age 58–59) India
- Party: Conservative
- Other political affiliations: Progressive Conservative (provincial)

Amarjeet Singh Gill MP (born 1967 or 1968) is a Canadian politician from the Conservative Party of Canada, serving as the Member of Parliament for Brampton West since 2025.

== Early life and career ==
Gill was born in India. His father served in the British Indian Army during World War II.

A longtime resident of Indore, Madhya Pradesh, Gill is an alumnus of Devi Ahilya Vishwavidyalaya. He received an MBA from the Institute of Management Studies.

In 1998, Gill emigrated to Canada, settling in Brampton shortly thereafter. Prior to entering politics, Gill was a realtor.

== Political career ==
=== Provincial politics ===
Gill unsuccessfully contested the riding of Mississauga—Brampton South in the 2011 and 2014 Ontario elections as a candidate for the Progressive Conservative Party of Ontario, losing to Liberal candidate Amrit Mangat both times.

=== Federal politics ===
Gill defeated Minister of Health Kamal Khera in the riding of Brampton West in the 2025 Canadian federal election. Gill was the only candidate to defeat a sitting cabinet minister. He is the first Conservative to represent Brampton since 2011.

== Electoral record ==
=== Federal elections ===
2025 Canadian federal election: Brampton West
Party	Candidate	Votes	%	±%	Expenditures
Conservative	Amarjeet Gill	21,112	49.8	+22.06	
Liberal	Kamal Khera	20,194	47.6	–8.62	
New Democratic	Zaigham Javed	708	1.7	–11.09	
Green	Sameera Khan	278	0.7	N/A	
Centrist	Khawaja Amir Hassan	95	0.2	N/A	
Total valid votes/expense limit		42,387	98.95	-0.25	
Total rejected ballots		448	1.05	+0.25	
Turnout		42,835	65.41	+11.11	
Eligible voters		65,486			
Conservative gain from Liberal		Swing		+15.34	
Source: Elections Canada

=== Provincial elections ===
2014 Ontario general election: Mississauga—Brampton South
Party	Candidate	Votes	%	±%
Liberal	Amrit Mangat	19,923	48.21	+2.17
Progressive Conservative	Amarjeet Gill	11,251	27.23	-3.17
New Democratic	Kevin Troake	6,906	16.71	+0.69
Green	Kathy Acheson	1,302	3.15	-0.53
Libertarian	Richard Levesque	993	2.40	+0.36
None of the Above	Kathleen Vezina	597	1.44	–
Independent	Robert Alilovic	351	0.85	–
Total valid votes		41,323	100.0	
Liberal hold		Swing		+2.67
Source: Elections Ontario

2011 Ontario general election: Mississauga—Brampton South
Party	Candidate	Votes	%	±%
Liberal	Amrit Mangat	15,579	46.04	−7.74
Progressive Conservative	Amarjeet Gill	10,287	30.40	+4.97
New Democratic	Karanjit Pandher	5,420	16.02	+5.71
Green	Keith Foster	1,247	3.68	−6.80
Libertarian	Christin Milloy	691	2.04	
Independent	Masood Khan	400	1.18	
Independent	Walter Widla	216	0.64	
Total valid votes		33,840	100.00	
Total rejected, unmarked and declined ballots		242	0.71	
Turnout		34,082	36.43	
Eligible voters		93,563		
Liberal hold		Swing		−6.36
Source(s) Elections Ontario (2011). "Official return from the records / Rapport des registres officiels - Mississauga—Brampton South" (PDF).
