= Bob Chiarelli =

Canadian politician (born 1941)

The Honourable Bob Chiarelli ECO
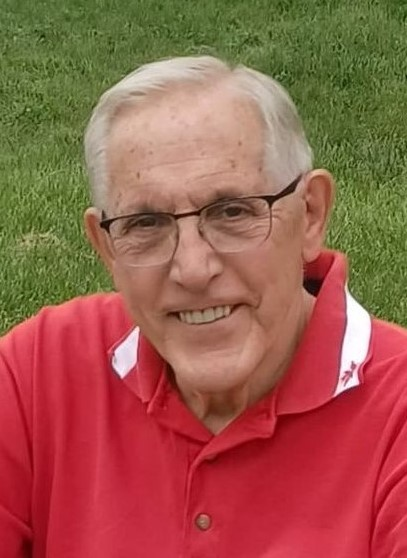
- Chiarelli in 2022

Member of the Ontario Provincial Parliament for Ottawa West—Nepean Ottawa West (1987–1997)
- In office March 4, 2010 – June 7, 2018
- Preceded by: Jim Watson
- Succeeded by: Jeremy Roberts
- In office September 10, 1987 – July 23, 1997
- Preceded by: Reuben Baetz
- Succeeded by: Alex Cullen

57th Mayor of Ottawa
- In office January 1, 2001 – December 1, 2006
- Preceded by: Allan Higdon (interim)
- Succeeded by: Larry O'Brien

Regional Chair of Ottawa-Carleton
- In office November 10, 1997 – January 1, 2001
- Preceded by: Peter Clark
- Succeeded by: Position abolished

Personal details
- Born: Robert Chiarelli; September 24, 1941 (age 85) Ottawa, Ontario, Canada
- Party: Liberal
- Spouses: Susan Orth (divorced) Carol Chiarelli (m. 1985; died 1996): Randi Hansen
- Profession: Lawyer

Roberto Chiarelli (born September 24, 1941) is a Canadian politician. He was a Liberal member in the Legislative Assembly of Ontario who served from 1987 to 1997 and again from 2010 to 2018 who represented the ridings of Ottawa West and Ottawa West—Nepean. He was the Regional Chair of the Regional Municipality of Ottawa–Carleton from 1997 to 2001 and was mayor of Ottawa from 2001 to 2006. He served in the provincial cabinets of Dalton McGuinty and Kathleen Wynne. Chiarelli was a candidate for Mayor of Ottawa in the 2022 Ottawa municipal election.

== Background ==
The youngest of seven children, Chiarelli is the son of Antonia (née Lorello) and Eugenio Chiarelli, an immigrant from Cleto, Calabria, Italy, who owned a grocery store and butcher shop in Little Italy on Rochester Street. Eugenio first moved to Ottawa, before Atonia moved from Italy with their first two children. The family lived above Eugenio's store. Bob was an ice hockey player in high school and attended Clarkson University, New York, on a hockey scholarship. He received a Bachelor of Business Administration degree, and then returned to Ottawa to attend the University of Ottawa law school. He began his legal practice in 1969. He served for seven years on the National Capital Commission. He lives in Ottawa with his partner Randi Hansen, and has five adult children and two grandchildren.

== Provincial politics ==
Chiarelli entered politics in 1987, where he ran as a Liberal candidate in the 1987 provincial election in the riding of Ottawa West. He defeated Progressive Conservative candidate Derek Insley by about 6,000 votes. He served as the parliamentary assistant to the Chair of the Management Board in 1987–88. Chiarelli was re-elected in the provincial elections of 1990 and 1995. Chiarelli endorsed Dalton McGuinty's bid to lead the Ontario Liberal Party in 1996.

He resigned his seat in 1997 in order to pursue a position in municipal politics.

=== Return to provincial politics ===
In 2010, Chiarelli ran as the Liberal Party candidate in a by-election held in the riding of Ottawa West–Nepean to succeed Jim Watson who resigned to run for Mayor of Ottawa. He won the by-election, which was held on March 4. Chiarelli was re-elected in the 2011 and 2014 elections.

On August 18, 2010, Chiarelli was appointed to cabinet as Minister of Public Infrastructure and Renewal.

On June 7, 2018, Chiarelli was defeated in the provincial election. He placed 3rd, behind the PC and NDP local candidates. The Progressive Conservatives, led by Doug Ford, won a sizeable majority government, ending 15 consecutive years of Liberal power.

== Municipal politics ==
In November 1997, Chiarelli contested the position of Regional Chair of the Regional Municipality of Ottawa–Carleton. He defeated incumbent Peter Clark. Chiarelli's win was the only Ottawa municipal contest where an incumbent was upset. For the next three years, he advocated eliminating the region's "two-tiered" government, and amalgamating the regional municipalities into a single city. The provincial government of Mike Harris did this in 2000, and Chiarelli declared himself a candidate to become the first mayor of the amalgamated city of Ottawa.

Chiarelli was elected as the first mayor of the newly amalgamated city of Ottawa on November 13, 2000 defeating former mayor of Gloucester, Ontario, Claudette Cain. He was easily re-elected in the 2003 election beating his closest rival by nearly 40,000 votes.

=== 2006 election ===
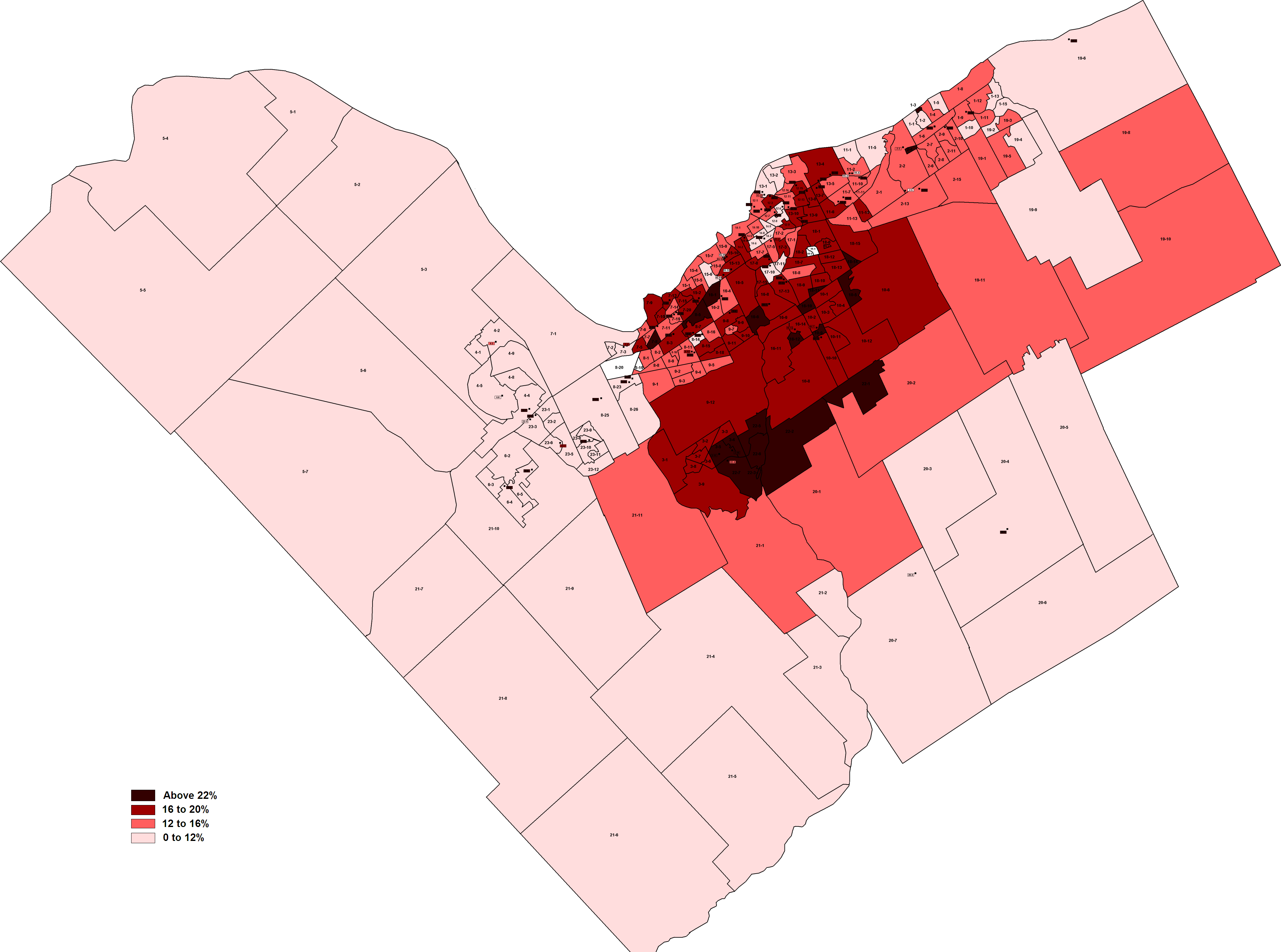
A map showing the distribution of Chiarelli's vote in the 2006 election. His best areas were his home district around Carlingwood and the southern suburbs that were to have been serviced by his O-Train plan.

In the 2006 election, he ran for re-election against two main opponents: former Kanata councillor Alex Munter, and businessman Larry O'Brien. Terry Kilrea, runner-up to Chiarelli in 2003, campaigned through the summer but withdrew when it seemed left-wing candidate Alex Munter had taken the lead. Kilrea decided to support Chiarelli for the remainder of the campaign.

Chiarelli's main project was the expansion of the city's light-rail system: a north-south line would run from Barrhaven to downtown Ottawa starting in 2009. His opponents in the election alleged that the project had been undertaken without sufficient consultation or communication with the public. The project was cancelled shortly after his departure of City Hall.

Chiarelli also had plans to improve the east end of the city. He introduced a 10-point revitalization plan that would include attracting more jobs and businesses east of the Rideau River in order to improve its economic development. He also planned to build new roads to improve connections between Orleans and the south end of the city. Also he promised to expand the existing bike trail system with additional trails connecting suburban and rural areas of Ottawa.

In a survey conducted by UniMarketing during the week of October 13, 2006, Chiarelli placed second with an 11-point percentage deficit on Munter but had a three-point advantage over O'Brien among the most likely to vote. In the election, he finished in third position with just over 15% of the vote and lost the mayoral position to O'Brien.

=== Return to municipal politics ===
On December 10, 2021, Chiarelli announced his intention to return to municipal politics, declaring himself a candidate for his former job as mayor in the 2022 municipal election. He finished third with 5.08% of the vote.

== Electoral record ==
2022 Ottawa municipal election: Mayor
Candidate	Popular vote			Expenditures
Candidate	Votes	%	±%	Expenditures
Mark Sutcliffe	161,679	51.37	–	$537,834.79
Catherine McKenney	119,241	37.88	–	$542,847.97
Bob Chiarelli	15,998	5.08	–	$96,844.84
Nour Kadri	7,496	2.38	–	$71,062.45
Mike Maguire	2,775	0.88	–	$5,500.00
Graham MacDonald	1,629	0.52	–	$5,334.50
Brandon Bay	1,512	0.48	–	$9,478.02
Param Singh	1,176	0.37	–	$13,650.40
Celine Debassige	867	0.28	–	none listed
Ade Olumide	636	0.20	–	$1,966.25
Gregory Jreg Guevara	584	0.19	–	$2,349.61
Bernard Couchman	471	0.15	-0.21	none listed
Jacob Solomon	432	0.14	–	none listed
Zed Chebib	264	0.08	–	none listed
Total valid votes	314,760	99.53		
Total rejected, unmarked and declined votes	1,500	0.47	-0.92	
Turnout	316,260	43.79	+1.24	
Eligible voters	722,227			
Note: Candidate campaign colours are based on the prominent colour used in campaign items (signs, literature, etc.) and are used as a visual differentiation between candidates.
Sources: City of Ottawa

2018 Ontario general election: Ottawa West—Nepean
Party	Candidate	Votes	%	±%
Progressive Conservative	Jeremy Roberts	16,590	32.82	−1.06
New Democratic	Chandra Pasma	16,415	32.48	+18.06
Liberal	Bob Chiarelli	14,810	29.30	−15.54
Green	Pat Freel	1,937	3.83	−2.35
None of the Above	Colin A. Pritchard	542	1.07	
Libertarian	Nicholas Paliga	251	0.50	-0.18
Total valid votes		50,545	98.92	
Total rejected, unmarked and declined ballots		552	1.08	-0.43
Turnout		51,097	57.04	+1.10
Eligible voters		89,575		
Progressive Conservative gain from Liberal		Swing		+7.24
Source: Elections Ontario

2014 Ontario general election: Ottawa West—Nepean
Party	Candidate	Votes	%	±%
Liberal	Bob Chiarelli	21,035	44.84	+4.06
Progressive Conservative	Randall Denley	15,895	33.89	−6.06
New Democratic	Alex Cullen	6,760	14.41	−0.51
Green	Alex Hill	2,899	6.18	+2.67
Libertarian	Matthew Brooks	318	0.68	
Total valid votes		46,907	98.49	
Total rejected, unmarked and declined ballots		719	1.51	
Turnout		47,626	55.95	
Eligible voters		85,125		
Liberal hold		Swing		+5.06
Source(s) "General Election Results by District, 066 Ottawa West—Nepean". Elections Ontario. 2014.

2011 Ontario general election: Ottawa West—Nepean
Party	Candidate	Votes	%	±%	Expenditures
Liberal	Bob Chiarelli	18,492	41.62	−1.83	$ 93,241.85
Progressive Conservative	Randall Denley	17,483	39.35	+0.36	80,950.00
New Democratic	Wendy Byrne	6,576	14.80	+6.35	13,936.09
Green	Alex Hill	1,485	3.34	−4.96	3,113.29
Family Coalition	John Pacheco	396	0.89		8,382.66
Total valid votes / expense limit		44,432	100.00	+56.27	$ 97,809.67
Total rejected, unmarked and declined ballots		174	0.39	−0.18	
Turnout		44,606	54.27	+21.33	
Eligible voters		82,187		−5.32	
Liberal hold		Swing		−1.10	
Source(s) "Summary of Valid Votes Cast for Each Candidate – October 6, 2011 General Election" (PDF). "Statistical Summary – General Elections 2011" ( XLS Spreadsheet (71KB)). Elections Ontario. "2011 Candidate Campaign Returns (CR-1)".

Ontario provincial by-election, March 4, 2010: Ottawa West—Nepean Resignation of Jim Watson
Party	Candidate	Votes	%	±%	Expenditures
Liberal	Bob Chiarelli	12,353	43.45	−7.19	$ 100,242.09
Progressive Conservative	Beth Graham	11,086	38.99	+7.19	98,437.24
New Democratic	Pam Fitzgerald	2,404	8.45	−1.24	20,689.04
Green	Mark Mackenzie	2,359	8.30	+2.13	16,707.36
Independent	John Turmel	230	0.81		0.00
Total valid votes		28,432	100.0	−39.61	
Total rejected ballots		163	0.57	−0.07	
Turnout		28,595	32.94	−24.57	
Eligible voters		86,809		+5.35	
Source(s) "Ottawa West-Nepean By-Election – March 4, 2010". Elections Ontario. "2010 By-Election Returns – Ottawa West-Nepean – Candidate (CR-1) & Association (CR-3) Returns". "MPP Watson to run for Ottawa mayor". CBC News. Archived from the original on January 15, 2010.

2006 Ottawa municipal election: Mayor
Party	Candidate	Votes	%	±%
Independent	Larry O'Brien	141,262	47.08	-
Independent	Alex Munter	108,752	36.25	-
Independent	Bob Chiarelli	46,697	15.56	-40.97
Independent	Jane Scharf	1,467	0.49	-
Independent	Piotr Anweiler	762	0.25	-
Independent	Robert Larter	667	0.22	-
Independent	Barkley Pollock	432	0.14	-
Total valid votes		300,039		

2003 Ottawa municipal election: Mayor
Party	Candidate	Votes	%	±%
Independent	Bob Chiarelli	104,595	56.53	+0.21
Independent	Terry Kilrea	66,634	36.02	-
Independent	Ike Awgu	5,394	2.92	-
Independent	Ron Burke	2,698	1.46	-
Independent	John A. Bell	2,027	1.10	-
Independent	Donna Upson	1,312	0.71	-
Independent	Paula Nemchin	1,191	0.64	+0.36
Independent	John Turmel	1,166	0.63	+0.36
Total valid votes		185,017		

2000 Ottawa municipal election: Mayor
Party	Candidate	Votes	%	±%
Independent	Bob Chiarelli	142,972	56.32	+6.72 (Note: Results taken from 1997 regional election.)
Independent	Claudette Cain	102,940	40.55	-
Independent	George Saadé	2,597	1.02	-
Independent	Marc-André Bélair	1,846	0.73	-
Independent	James A. Hall	843	0.33	-
Independent	Ken Mills	773	0.30	-
Independent	Paula Nemchin	702	0.28	-
Independent	John Turmel	677	0.27	-2.23
Independent	Morteza Naini	516	0.20	-
Total valid votes		253,866		

1997 Ottawa-Carleton Regional Municipality elections: Regional Chair
Party	Candidate	Votes	%	±%
Independent	Bob Chiarelli	82,165	49.54	-
Independent	Peter Clark	79,407	47.88	-7.12
Independent	John Turmel	4,129	2.49	+0.14
Total valid votes		165,845		
Source:Official Results, City of Ottawa Archives

1995 Ontario general election: Ottawa West
Party	Candidate	Votes	%	±%
Liberal	Bob Chiarelli	14,516	45.48	+3.87
Progressive Conservative	Greg Joy	12,898	40.41	+13.28
New Democratic	Karim Ismaili	3,718	11.64	−13.47
Green	Stephen Johns	448	1.40	−1.60
Independent	Andy Sammon	241	0.75	−
Natural Law	Stan Lamothe	96	0.30	−
Total valid votes		31,917	100.00	
Total rejected, unmarked and declined ballots		433	1.34	
Turnout		32,234	64.43	
Eligible voters		51,542		
Liberal hold		Swing		

1990 Ontario general election: Ottawa West
Party	Candidate	Votes	%	±%
Liberal	Bob Chiarelli	13,908	41.61	−8.85
Progressive Conservative	Brian Mackey	9,068	27.13	−3.59
New Democratic	Allan Edwards	8,391	25.11	+11.51
Confederation of Regions	David Boyd	1,044	3.14	−
Green	Ian Whyte	1,011	3.00	−
Total valid votes		33,422	100.00	
Total rejected, unmarked and declined ballots		433	1.28	
Turnout		33,855	65.68	
Eligible voters		51,542		
Liberal hold		Swing		

1987 Ontario general election: Ottawa West
Party	Candidate	Votes	%	±%
Liberal	Bob Chiarelli	16,343	50.46	+12.94
Progressive Conservative	Derek Insley	9,951	30.72	−15.91
New Democratic	Paul Weinzweig	4,403	13.60	−0.08
Family Coalition	Lynn McPherson	1,689	5.21	–
Total valid votes		32,386	100.00	
Total rejected, unmarked and declined ballots		251	0.77	
Turnout		32,637	61.61	
Eligible voters		52,977		
Liberal gain		Swing		

Wynne ministry, Province of Ontario (2013–2018)
Cabinet posts (2)
Predecessor	Office	Successor
Brad Duguid	Minister of Infrastructure; 2016-2018	Monte McNaughton
Chris Bentley	Minister of Energy; 2013-2016	Glenn Thibeault
McGuinty ministry, Province of Ontario (2003–2013)
Cabinet posts (3)
Predecessor	Office	Successor
Kathleen Wynne	Minister of Municipal Affairs and Housing; 2012-2013	Linda Jeffrey
Kathleen Wynne	Minister of Transportation; 2011-2013	Glen Murray
Brad Duguid (Energy and Infrastructure)	Minister of Infrastructure; 2010-2013	Glen Murray
