= Mississauga—Malton (provincial electoral district) =

Provincial electoral district in Ontario, Canada

Coordinates: 43.655°N 79.660°W

Ontario electoral district
- Location in Mississauga

Provincial electoral district
- Legislature: Legislative Assembly of Ontario
MPP
Deepak Anand
Progressive Conservative
- District created: 2015
- First contested: 2018
- Last contested: 2025

Demographics
- Population (2016): 118,240
- Electors (2018): 78,394
- Area (km²): 96
- Pop. density (per km²): 1,231.7
- Census division: Peel
- Census subdivision: Mississauga

Mississauga—Malton is a provincial electoral district in Ontario, Canada. It elects one member to the Legislative Assembly of Ontario. This riding was created in 2015.

== Members of Provincial Parliament ==
Mississauga—Malton
| Assembly | Years | Member | Party |
|---|---|---|---|
Riding created from Bramalea—Gore—Malton, Mississauga—Brampton South and Mississauga—Streetsville
| 42nd | 2018–2022 | Deepak Anand | Progressive Conservative |
| 43rd | 2022–present | Deepak Anand | Progressive Conservative |

== Election results ==
Winning party in each polling division of Mississauga—Malton at the 2025 Ontario general election

2025 Ontario general election
| Party | Candidate | Votes | % | ±% |
|---|---|---|---|---|
| Progressive Conservative | Deepak Anand | 15,117 | 50.94 | +6.05 |
| Liberal | Jawad Haroon | 11,499 | 38.75 | +8.30 |
| New Democratic | Gerard McDonald | 2,000 | 6.74 | –10.97 |
| Green | Arish Esmail | 561 | 1.89 | –2.15 |
| New Blue | Van Nguyen | 498 | 1.68 | –1.23 |
| Total valid votes | | 29,675 | 99.53 | |
| Total rejected, unmarked and declined ballots | | 139 | 0.47 | –0.25 |
| Turnout | | 29,814 | 36.70 | +0.18 |
| Eligible voters | | 81,246 | | |
| Progressive Conservative hold | | Swing | | +7.17 |
Source: Elections Ontario

Winning party in each polling division of Mississauga—Malton at the 2022 Ontario general election

2022 Ontario general election
| Party | Candidate | Votes | % | ±% |
|---|---|---|---|---|
| Progressive Conservative | Deepak Anand | 13,028 | 44.89 | +5.77 |
| Liberal | Aman Gill | 8,838 | 30.45 | +9.68 |
| New Democratic | Waseem Ahmed | 5,140 | 17.71 | –15.13 |
| Green | Robert Chan | 1,173 | 4.04 | +2.25 |
| New Blue | Van Nguyen | 844 | 2.91 | – |
| Total valid votes | | 29,023 | 99.28 | |
| Total rejected, unmarked and declined ballots | | 210 | 0.72 | –0.10 |
| Turnout | | 29,233 | 36.51 | –11.86 |
| Eligible voters | | 80,059 | | |
| Progressive Conservative hold | | Swing | | –1.95 |
Source: Elections Ontario

2018 Ontario general election
| Party | Candidate | Votes | % | ±% |
|---|---|---|---|---|
| Progressive Conservative | Deepak Anand | 14,712 | 39.12 | +18.63 |
| New Democratic | Nikki Clarke | 12,351 | 32.84 | +9.55 |
| Liberal | Amrit Mangat | 7,813 | 20.77 | –26.82 |
| Independent | Caroline Roach | 1,187 | 3.16 | – |
| Green | Eryn Sylvester | 674 | 1.79 | –0.95 |
| Libertarian | Michelle Ciupka | 657 | 1.75 | – |
| None of the Above | Alex Vezina | 217 | 0.58 | – |
| Total valid votes | | 37,611 | 99.18 | |
| Total rejected, unmarked and declined ballots | | 312 | 0.82 | |
| Turnout | | 37,923 | 48.37 | |
| Eligible voters | | 78,394 | | |
| Progressive Conservative notional gain from Liberal | | Swing | | ▲22.73 |
Source: Elections Ontario

2014 general election redistributed results
| Party | Vote | % |
|---|---|---|
| Liberal | 14,470 | 48.27 |
| New Democratic | 7,303 | 24.36 |
| Progressive Conservative | 6,525 | 21.76 |
| Others | 845 | 2.82 |
| Green | 838 | 2.80 |

== Student vote results ==
2018 Mississauga—Malton student vote
| Affiliation | Candidate | Votes | % |
| New Democratic | Nikki Clarke | 1,571 | 34.80 |
| Liberal | Amrit Mangat | 948 | 21.00 |
| Progressive Conservative | Deepak Anand | 923 | 20.44 |
| Green | Eryn Sylvester | 369 | 8.17 |
| Independent | Caroline Roach | 340 | 7.53 |
| Libertarian | Michelle Ciupka | 212 | 4.70 |
| None of the Above | Alex Vezina | 152 | 3.37 |

== See also ==
- List of Ontario provincial electoral districts
- Canadian provincial electoral districts
- Mississauga—Malton (federal electoral district)
