= Ottawa West—Nepean (provincial electoral district) =

Provincial electoral district in Ontario, Canada

Coordinates: 45°21′N 75°47′W

Ontario electoral district
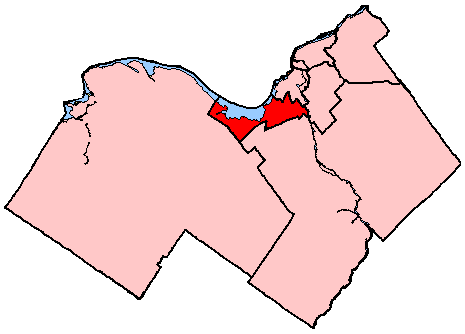

Provincial electoral district
- Legislature: Legislative Assembly of Ontario
MPP
Chandra Pasma
New Democratic
- First contested: 1999
- Last contested: 2025

Demographics
- Population (2016): 111,835
- Electors (2018): 89,575
- Area (km²): 88
- Pop. density (per km²): 1,270.9
- Census division: Ottawa
- Census subdivision: Ottawa

Ottawa West—Nepean (French: Ottawa-Ouest–Nepean) is a provincial electoral district in eastern Ontario, Canada. It elects one member to the Legislative Assembly of Ontario. The riding is represented in the Ontario legislature by the NDP's Chandra Pasma.

The riding has been fairly solidly Liberal. In the 1999 provincial election, former Member of Provincial Parliament Alex Cullen lost the nomination to Rick Chiarelli following fierce party battles. Cullen instead ran for the Ontario New Democratic Party (NDP). The seat was won by Tory Garry Guzzo. In the 2003 provincial election, former Ottawa mayor Jim Watson ousted Guzzo.

Former Ottawa mayor Bob Chiarelli won the seat in a March 4, 2010, by-election, after Jim Watson left his seat to run in the 2010 Ottawa municipal election. Chiarelli lost his seat to PC Jeremy Roberts in 2018 which saw the former governing Liberals fall to third place in the legislature. In the 2022 provincial election the NDP's Chandra Pasma defeated Roberts, the only PC incumbent to lose his seat in the election. This marked the first time the NDP had ever won the seat, either provincially or federally.

== History ==
The electoral district was created in 1999 from 77% of Ottawa West, 38% of Nepean and 21% of Ottawa—Rideau.

== Members of Provincial Parliament ==
This riding has elected the following members of the Legislative Assembly of Ontario:

Ottawa West—Nepean
Assembly	Years	Member	Party
Riding created from Ottawa West, Nepean and Ottawa—Rideau
37th	1999–2003	Garry Guzzo	Progressive Conservative
38th	2003–2007	Jim Watson	Liberal
39th	2007–2010	Jim Watson	Liberal
39th	2010–2011	Bob Chiarelli	Liberal
40th	2011–2014	Bob Chiarelli	Liberal
41st	2014–2018	Bob Chiarelli	Liberal
42nd	2018–2022	Jeremy Roberts	Progressive Conservative
43rd	2022–2025	Chandra Pasma	New Democratic
44th	2025–present	Chandra Pasma	New Democratic

== Election results ==
Winning party in each polling division of Ottawa West—Nepean at the 2025 Ontario general election

2025 Ontario general election
Party	Candidate	Votes	%	±%	Expenditures
New Democratic	Chandra Pasma	20,087	49.33	+11.79	$79,106
Progressive Conservative	Husien Abu-Rayash	11,697	28.72	–6.22	$59,137
Liberal	Brett Szmul	7,229	17.75	–4.69	$13,733
Green	Sophia Andrew-Joiner	976	2.40	–1.13	$0
New Blue	Rylan Vroom	733	1.80	N/A	$0
Total valid votes/expense limit		40,722	99.34	+0.76	$146,145
Total rejected, unmarked, and declined ballots		271	0.66	–0.76	
Turnout		40,993	45.32	–2.10	
Eligible voters		90,450			
New Democratic hold		Swing		+9.01	
Source(s): "Vote Totals From Official Tabulation" (PDF). Elections Ontario. March 2, 2025.

Winning party in each polling division of Ottawa West—Nepean at the 2022 Ontario general election

2022 Ontario general election
Party	Candidate	Votes	%	±%	Expenditures
New Democratic	Chandra Pasma	15,696	37.54	+5.06	$125,025
Progressive Conservative	Jeremy Roberts	14,610	34.94	+2.12	$90,418
Liberal	Sam Bhalesar	9,384	22.44	−6.86	$67,587
Green	Steven Warren	1,475	3.53	−0.30	$4,298
Ontario Party	Vilteau Delvas	649	1.55		$5,110
Total valid votes/expense limit		41,814	98.58	-0.34	$127,707
Total rejected, unmarked, and declined ballots		601	1.42	+0.34	
Turnout		42,415	47.42	-9.62	
Eligible voters		91,223			
New Democratic gain from Progressive Conservative		Swing		+1.47	
Source(s): "Summary of Valid Votes Cast for Each Candidate" (PDF). Elections Ontario. 2022. Archived from the original on May 18, 2023.; "Statistical Summary by Electoral District" (PDF). Elections Ontario. 2022. Archived from the original on May 21, 2023.

2018 Ontario general election
Party	Candidate	Votes	%	±%
Progressive Conservative	Jeremy Roberts	16,590	32.82	−1.06
New Democratic	Chandra Pasma	16,415	32.48	+18.06
Liberal	Bob Chiarelli	14,810	29.30	−15.54
Green	Pat Freel	1,937	3.83	−2.35
None of the Above	Colin A. Pritchard	542	1.07	
Libertarian	Nicholas Paliga	251	0.50	-0.18
Total valid votes		50,545	98.92	
Total rejected, unmarked and declined ballots		552	1.08	-0.43
Turnout		51,097	57.04	+1.10
Eligible voters		89,575		
Progressive Conservative gain from Liberal		Swing		+7.24
Source: Elections Ontario

2014 Ontario general election
Party	Candidate	Votes	%	±%
Liberal	Bob Chiarelli	21,035	44.84	+4.06
Progressive Conservative	Randall Denley	15,895	33.89	−6.06
New Democratic	Alex Cullen	6,760	14.41	−0.51
Green	Alex Hill	2,899	6.18	+2.67
Libertarian	Matthew Brooks	318	0.68	
Total valid votes		46,907	98.49	
Total rejected, unmarked and declined ballots		719	1.51	
Turnout		47,626	55.95	
Eligible voters		85,125		
Liberal hold		Swing		+5.06
Source(s) "General Election Results by District, 066 Ottawa West—Nepean". Elections Ontario. 2014.

2011 Ontario general election
Party	Candidate	Votes	%	±%	Expenditures
Liberal	Bob Chiarelli	18,492	41.62	−1.83	$ 93,241.85
Progressive Conservative	Randall Denley	17,483	39.35	+0.36	80,950.00
New Democratic	Wendy Byrne	6,576	14.80	+6.35	13,936.09
Green	Alex Hill	1,485	3.34	−4.96	3,113.29
Family Coalition	John Pacheco	396	0.89		8,382.66
Total valid votes / expense limit		44,432	100.00	+56.27	$ 97,809.67
Total rejected, unmarked and declined ballots		174	0.39	−0.18	
Turnout		44,606	54.27	+21.33	
Eligible voters		82,187		−5.32	
Liberal hold		Swing		−1.10	
Source(s) "Summary of Valid Votes Cast for Each Candidate – October 6, 2011 General Election" (PDF). "Statistical Summary – General Elections 2011" ( XLS Spreadsheet (71KB)). Elections Ontario. "2011 Candidate Campaign Returns (CR-1)".

Ontario provincial by-election, March 4, 2010 Resignation of Jim Watson
Party	Candidate	Votes	%	±%	Expenditures
Liberal	Bob Chiarelli	12,353	43.45	−7.19	$ 100,242.09
Progressive Conservative	Beth Graham	11,086	38.99	+7.19	98,437.24
New Democratic	Pam Fitzgerald	2,404	8.45	−1.24	20,689.04
Green	Mark Mackenzie	2,359	8.30	+2.13	16,707.36
Independent	John Turmel	230	0.81		0.00
Total valid votes		28,432	100.0	−39.61	
Total rejected ballots		163	0.57	−0.07	
Turnout		28,595	32.94	−24.57	
Eligible voters		86,809		+5.35	
Source(s) "Ottawa West-Nepean By-Election – March 4, 2010". Elections Ontario. "2010 By-Election Returns – Ottawa West-Nepean – Candidate (CR-1) & Association (CR-3) Returns". "MPP Watson to run for Ottawa mayor". CBC News. Archived from the original on January 15, 2010.

2007 Ontario general election
Party	Candidate	Votes	%	±%	Expenditures
Liberal	Jim Watson	23,842	50.64	+3.60	$ 81,588.12
Progressive Conservative	Mike Patton	14,971	31.80	−9.44	67,155.94
New Democratic	Lynn Hamilton	4,564	9.69	+1.35	15,904.92
Green	Martin Hyde	2,903	6.17	+3.51	1,064.61
Family Coalition	John Pacheco	592	1.26		6,938.62
Independent	Robert Gilles Gauthier	207	0.44	−0.28	Unavailable
Total valid votes/expense limit		47,079	100.0	−4.24	$ 88,988.76
Total rejected ballots		304	0.64	+0.09	
Turnout		47,383	57.51	−4.62	
Eligible voters		82,397		+3.55	
Source(s) "Summary of Valid Votes Cast for Each Candidate – October 10, 2007 General Election" (PDF). "Statistical Summary – General Election 2007" (PDF). Elections Ontario. "2007 Candidate Campaign Returns (CR-1)".

2003 Ontario general election
Party	Candidate	Votes	%	±%	Expenditures
Liberal	Jim Watson	23,127	47.04	+12.68	$ 67,833.00
Progressive Conservative	Garry Guzzo	20,277	41.24	−6.55	60,734.31
New Democratic	Marlene Rivier	4,099	8.34	−7.78	17,396.47
Green	Neil Adair	1,309	2.66	+1.71	2,684.09
Independent	Robert G. Gauthier	353	0.72		Unavailable
Total valid votes/expense limit		49,165	100.0	+2.90	$ 76,392.96
Total rejected ballots		272	0.55	−0.27	
Turnout		49,437	62.13	+3.24	
Eligible voters		79,576		−2.72	
Source(s) "General Election of October 2, 2003 – Summary of Valid Ballots by Candidate". Elections Ontario. "General Election of October 2, 2003 – Statistical Summary". "2003 Candidate and Constituency Associations – Candidate Campaign Return (CR-1)".

1999 Ontario general election
Party	Candidate	Votes	%	Expenditures
Progressive Conservative	Garry Guzzo	22,834	47.79	$ 52,524.00
Liberal	Rick Chiarelli	16,419	34.36	69,057.01
New Democratic	Alex Cullen	7,701	16.12	32,467.74
Green	Richard Warman	453	0.95	0.00
Independent	Megan Hnatiw	129	0.27	0.00
Independent	John Turmel	94	0.20	0.00
Confederation of Regions	Anthony C. Silvestro	79	0.17	806.00
Natural Law	Lester J. Newby	70	0.15	0.00
Total valid votes/expense limit		47,779	100.0	$ 78,526.08
Total rejected ballots		393	0.82	
Turnout		48,172	58.89	
Eligible voters		81,798		
Source(s) "General Election of June 3 1999 – Summary of Valid Ballots by Candidate". Elections Ontario. "General Election of June 3 1999 – Statistical Summary". "1999 Candidate and Constituency Associations – Candidate Campaign Return (CR-1)".

== 2007 electoral reform referendum ==
2007 Ontario electoral reform referendum
Side	Votes	%
First Past the Post	30,528	68.8
Mixed member proportional	15,172	31.2

== See also ==
- List of Ontario provincial electoral districts
- Canadian provincial electoral districts
