= Amrit Mangat =

Canadian politician

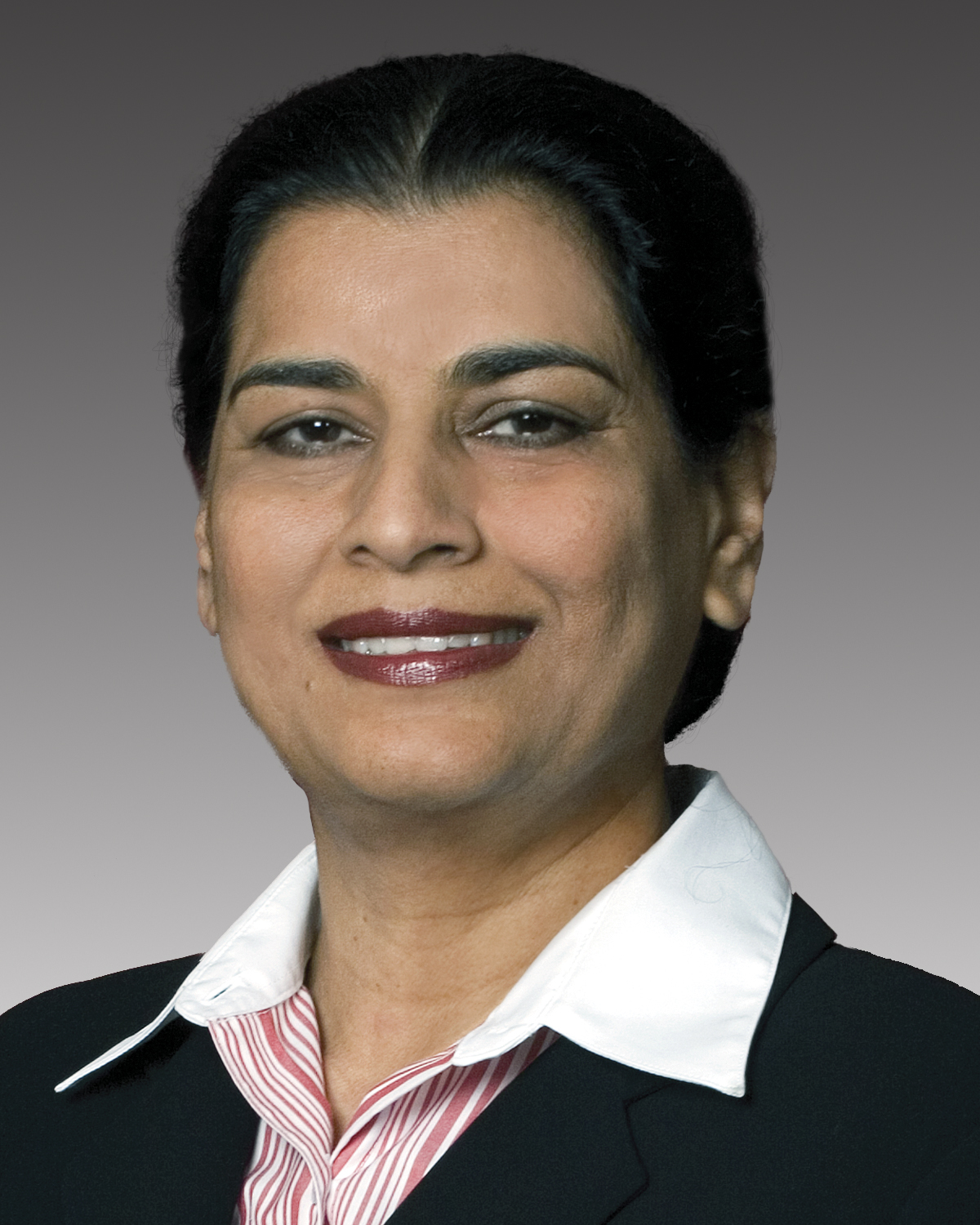

Ontario MPP
- In office 2007–2018
- Preceded by: New riding
- Succeeded by: Riding abolished
- Constituency: Mississauga—Brampton South

Personal details
- Born: 1953 (age 72–73) Ludhiana, Punjab, India
- Party: Liberal
- Spouse: Jaswant Mangat
- Occupation: Teacher, business administrator

Amrit Mangat (born c. 1953) is a former politician in Ontario, Canada. She was a Liberal member of the Legislative Assembly of Ontario from 2007 to 2018 who represented the riding of Mississauga—Brampton South.

== Background ==
Mangat was born in Jagroan, India. Her parents were originally from West Punjab but were forced to emigrate during the Partition of India in 1947. Mangat studied in India and obtained degrees in political science, economics, English and education. After immigrating to Canada in 1992 she obtained her Ontario College of Teachers certification. In addition to teaching, Mangat managed several small businesses. She most recently worked as an administrator in a law firm, helping new Canadians to settle.

She lives with her husband Jaswant who works as a lawyer.

== Politics ==
In 2004 she tried to get nominated in the federal riding of Brampton West but lost to Colleen Beaumier. In the 2007 provincial election she ran as the Liberal candidate in the riding of Mississauga—Brampton South. During the campaign she came out in support of keeping Peel Memorial Hospital open and she spoke against the Conservative promise to fund private faith-based schools. She defeated Progressive Conservative candidate Ravi Singh by 10,405 votes. She was re-elected in 2011 and 2014.

During her time in government she was appointed as Parliamentary assistant to a number of roles including Seniors and transportation.

As of 2014, she serves as a Parliamentary Assistant to the Minister of the Environment and Climate Change.

In the 2018 Provincial Election, she stood in the new riding of Mississauga—Malton and placed third.

=== Electoral record ===
2018 Ontario general election: Mississauga—Malton
Party	Candidate	Votes	%	±%
Progressive Conservative	Deepak Anand	14,712	39.12	+18.63
New Democratic	Nikki Clarke	12,351	32.84	+9.55
Liberal	Amrit Mangat	7,813	20.77	–26.82
Independent	Caroline Roach	1,187	3.16	–
Green	Eryn Sylvester	674	1.79	–0.95
Libertarian	Michelle Ciupka	657	1.75	–
None of the Above	Alex Vezina	217	0.58	–
Total valid votes		37,611	99.18	
Total rejected, unmarked and declined ballots		312	0.82	
Turnout		37,923	48.37	
Eligible voters		78,394		
Progressive Conservative notional gain from Liberal		Swing		▲22.73
Source: Elections Ontario

2014 Ontario general election: Mississauga—Brampton South
Party	Candidate	Votes	%	±%
Liberal	Amrit Mangat	19,923	48.21	+2.18
Progressive Conservative	Amarjeet Gill	11,251	27.23	–3.17
New Democratic	Kevin Troake	6,906	16.71	+0.70
Green	Kathy Acheson	1,302	3.15	–0.53
Libertarian	Richard Levesque	993	2.40	+0.36
None of the Above	Kathleen Vezina	597	1.44	–
Independent	Robert Alilovic	351	0.85	–
Total valid votes		41,323	98.63	
Total rejected, unmarked and declined ballots		573	1.37	+0.66
Turnout		41,896	41.48	+5.05
Eligible voters		101,010		
Liberal hold		Swing		+2.67
Source: Elections Ontario

2011 Ontario general election: Mississauga—Brampton South
Party	Candidate	Votes	%	±%
Liberal	Amrit Mangat	15,579	46.04	–7.74
Progressive Conservative	Amarjeet Gill	10,287	30.40	+4.97
New Democratic	Karanjit Pandher	5,420	16.02	+5.70
Green	Keith Foster	1,247	3.68	–6.79
Libertarian	Christin Milloy	691	2.04	–
Independent	Masood Khan	400	1.18	–
Independent	Walter Widla	216	0.64	–
Total valid votes		33,840	99.29	
Total rejected, unmarked and declined ballots		242	0.71	–0.63
Turnout		34,082	36.43	–6.04
Eligible voters		93,563		
Liberal hold		Swing		–6.36
Source: Elections Ontario

2007 Ontario general election: Mississauga—Brampton South
Party	Candidate	Votes	%
Liberal	Amrit Mangat	19,738	53.78
Progressive Conservative	Ravi Singh	9,333	25.43
Green	Paul Simas	3,846	10.48
New Democratic	Karan Pandher	3,785	10.31
Total valid votes		36,702	98.66
Total rejected, unmarked and declined ballots		497	1.34
Turnout		37,199	42.46
Eligible voters		87,604	
Liberal pickup new district.			
Source: Elections Ontario
