= Randall Denley =

Canadian journalist

Personal details
- Born: London, Ontario
- Party: Progressive Conservative Party of Ontario
- Occupation: Novelist, journalist
- Website: randalldenley.com

Randall Denley is a Canadian journalist who ran as the Progressive Conservative (PC) candidate for Member of Provincial Parliament (MPP) in Ottawa West—Nepean in 2011 election and 2014 election. He writes for the Ottawa Citizen and National Post as a columnist.

== Background ==
Denley was born London, Ontario, Denley graduated from the University of Western Ontario with a journalism degree in 1973.

== Writing career ==
Denley spent several years as a journalist and editor for the Owen Sound Sun Times before joining the Ottawa Citizen as a journalist in 1983. In 1992, he moved from the regular journalism beat to a political column with the paper, writing about both municipal and provincial politics.

Denley's first novel, a murder mystery titled Necessary Victims, was serialized in the Citizen in 2004. In 2006, he published The Perfect Candidate, a satire of local municipal politics in which Will Hacker, a former hockey player turned radio talk show host, is bribed by local developers to run a fake campaign for mayor of Ottawa. His third novel, a murder mystery titled One Dead Sister, was published in 2010.

Denley now publishes the occasional op-ed in newspapers like the National Post.

== Provincial politics ==
Denley took a leave of absence from the Citizen in 2011 to run as an Ontario Progressive Conservative Party candidate in Ottawa West—Nepean for the 2011 provincial election. He briefly returned to the Citizen as an editorial writer after losing the election to incumbent MPP Bob Chiarelli, but retired from the paper in 2012. He ran again in the 2014 election, again losing to Chiarelli.

=== Electoral record ===
2014 Ontario general election: Ottawa West—Nepean
| Party | Candidate | Votes | % | ±% |
|---|---|---|---|---|
| Liberal | Bob Chiarelli | 21,035 | 44.84 | +4.06 |
| Progressive Conservative | Randall Denley | 15,895 | 33.89 | −6.06 |
| New Democratic | Alex Cullen | 6,760 | 14.41 | −0.51 |
| Green | Alex Hill | 2,899 | 6.18 | +2.67 |
| Libertarian | Matthew Brooks | 318 | 0.68 | |
| Total valid votes | | 46,907 | 98.49 | |
| Total rejected, unmarked and declined ballots | | 719 | 1.51 | |
| Turnout | | 47,626 | 55.95 | |
| Eligible voters | | 85,125 | | |
| Liberal hold | | Swing | | +5.06 |
Source(s) "General Election Results by District, 066 Ottawa West—Nepean". Elections Ontario. 2014.

2011 Ontario general election: Ottawa West—Nepean
| Party | Candidate | Votes | % | ±% | Expenditures |
|---|---|---|---|---|---|
| Liberal | Bob Chiarelli | 18,492 | 41.62 | −1.83 | $ 93,241.85 |
| Progressive Conservative | Randall Denley | 17,483 | 39.35 | +0.36 | 80,950.00 |
| New Democratic | Wendy Byrne | 6,576 | 14.80 | +6.35 | 13,936.09 |
| Green | Alex Hill | 1,485 | 3.34 | −4.96 | 3,113.29 |
| Family Coalition | John Pacheco | 396 | 0.89 | | 8,382.66 |
| Total valid votes / expense limit | | 44,432 | 100.00 | +56.27 | $ 97,809.67 |
| Total rejected, unmarked and declined ballots | | 174 | 0.39 | −0.18 | |
| Turnout | | 44,606 | 54.27 | +21.33 | |
| Eligible voters | | 82,187 | | −5.32 | |
| Liberal hold | | Swing | | −1.10 | |
Source(s) "Summary of Valid Votes Cast for Each Candidate – October 6, 2011 General Election" (PDF). "Statistical Summary – General Elections 2011" ( XLS Spreadsheet (71KB)). Elections Ontario. "2011 Candidate Campaign Returns (CR-1)".
