= Mississauga—Brampton South (provincial electoral district) =

Coordinates: 43.6°N 79.6°W

Ontario electoral district
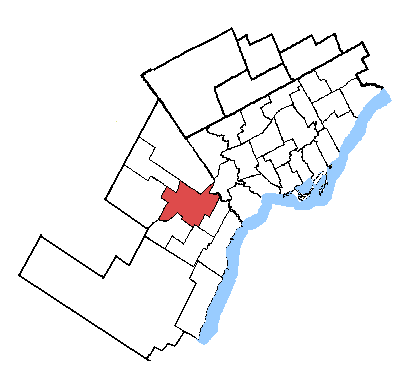
- Mississauga—Brampton South in relation to other Greater Toronto ridings

Defunct provincial electoral district
- Legislature: Legislative Assembly of Ontario
- District created: 2003
- District abolished: 2015
- First contested: 2007
- Last contested: 2014

Demographics
- Population (2006): 147,096
- Electors (2011): 90,777
- Area (km²): 82
- Census division: Peel
- Census subdivision(s): Mississauga, Brampton

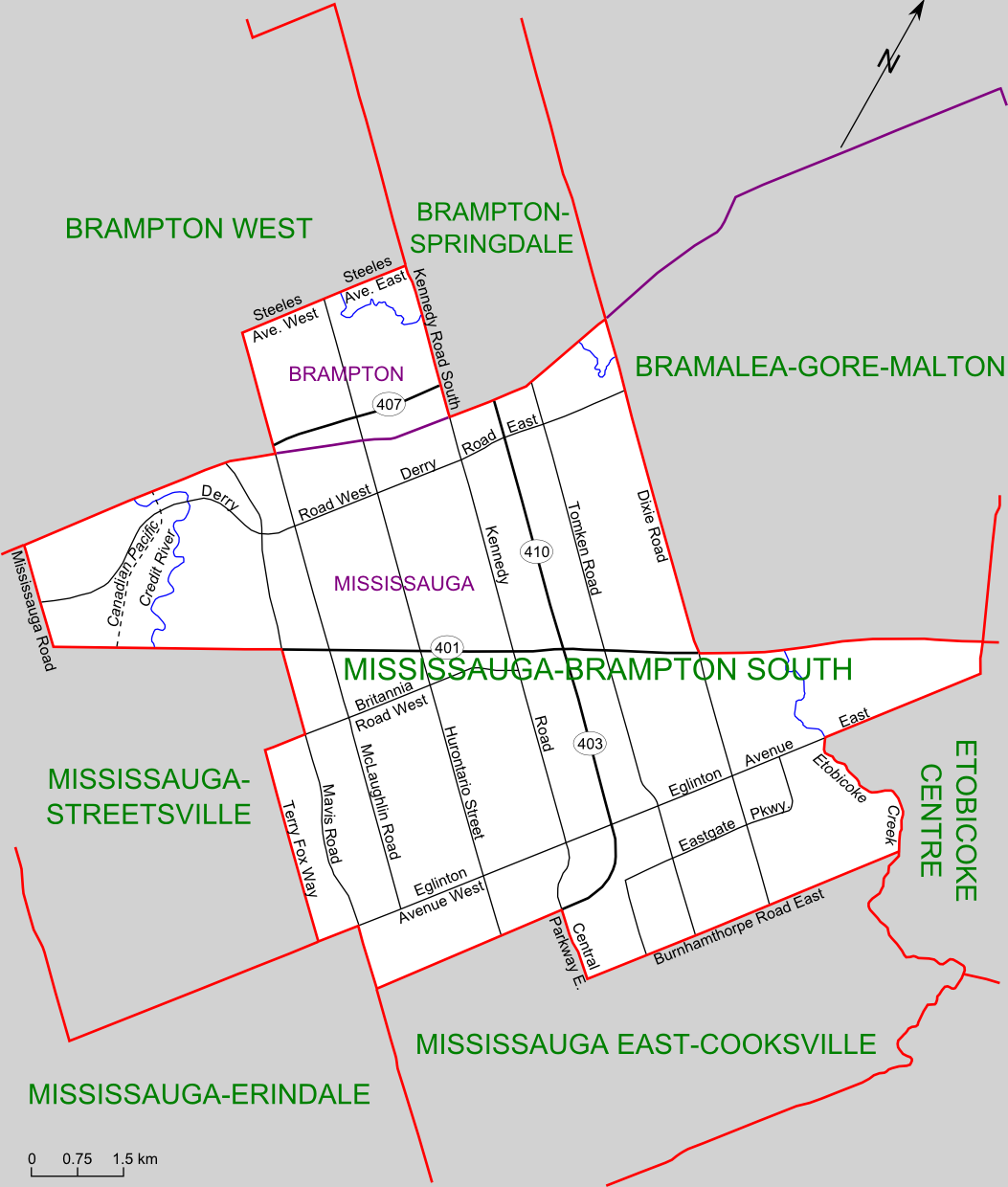
Map of Mississauga-Brampton South

Mississauga—Brampton South was a provincial electoral district in Ontario, Canada, that has been represented in the Legislative Assembly of Ontario from the 2007 provincial election until 2018. It was dissolved into Mississauga—Malton, Mississauga—Streetsville, Mississauga East—Cooksville, Mississauga Centre, Brampton South and Brampton Centre.

== Geography ==
It consisted of the parts of the cities of Mississauga and Brampton bounded by a line drawn from the intersection of Highway 401 with the northeastern limit of the City of Mississauga, south along the city limit, southwest along Burnhamthorpe Road East, northwest along Central Parkway East, southwest along Highway 403, northwest along Mavis Road; thence northwesterly along said road to Eglinton Avenue West; thence southwesterly along said avenue to Terry Fox Way; thence northwesterly along said way to Britannia Road West; thence northeasterly along said road to Mavis Road, southwest along Highway 401, northwest along Mississauga Road, northeast along the northwestern limit of the City of Mississauga, northwest along McLaughlin Road, northeast along Steeles Avenue East, southeast along Kennedy Road South, northeast along the northwestern limit of the City of Mississauga, southeast along Dixie Road, and northeast along Highway 401 to the point of commencement.

== History ==
It was created in 2003 from Bramalea—Gore—Malton—Springdale, Brampton West—Mississauga, Mississauga Centre and Mississauga East ridings. In the 2011 provincial election, it had the lowest turnout of any riding in the province.

== Members of Provincial Parliament ==
Mississauga—Brampton South
Assembly	Years	Member	Party
Riding created from Bramalea—Gore—Malton—Springdale, Brampton West—Mississauga, Mississauga Centre and Mississauga East
39th	2007–2011	Amrit Mangat	Liberal
40th	2011–2014	Amrit Mangat	Liberal
41st	2014–2018	Amrit Mangat	Liberal
Riding dissolved into Mississauga—Malton, Mississauga—Streetsville, Mississauga East—Cooksville, Mississauga Centre, Brampton South and Brampton Centre

== Election results ==
2014 Ontario general election
Party	Candidate	Votes	%	±%
Liberal	Amrit Mangat	19,923	48.21	+2.17
Progressive Conservative	Amarjeet Gill	11,251	27.23	-3.17
New Democratic	Kevin Troake	6,906	16.71	+0.69
Green	Kathy Acheson	1,302	3.15	-0.53
Libertarian	Richard Levesque	993	2.40	+0.36
None of the Above	Kathleen Vezina	597	1.44	–
Independent	Robert Alilovic	351	0.85	–
Total valid votes		41,323	100.0	
Liberal hold		Swing		+2.67
Source: Elections Ontario

2011 Ontario general election
Party	Candidate	Votes	%	±%
Liberal	Amrit Mangat	15,579	46.04	−7.74
Progressive Conservative	Amarjeet Gill	10,287	30.40	+4.97
New Democratic	Karanjit Pandher	5,420	16.02	+5.71
Green	Keith Foster	1,247	3.68	−6.80
Libertarian	Christin Milloy	691	2.04	
Independent	Masood Khan	400	1.18	
Independent	Walter Widla	216	0.64	
Total valid votes		33,840	100.00	
Total rejected, unmarked and declined ballots		242	0.71	
Turnout		34,082	36.43	
Eligible voters		93,563		
Liberal hold		Swing		−6.36
Source(s) Elections Ontario (2011). "Official return from the records / Rapport des registres officiels - Mississauga—Brampton South" (PDF).

2007 Ontario general election
Party	Candidate	Votes	%
Liberal	Amrit Mangat	19,738	53.78
Progressive Conservative	Ravi Singh	9,333	25.43
Green	Paul Simas	3,846	10.48
New Democratic	Karan Pandher	3,785	10.31
Total valid votes		36,702	100.0

== 2007 electoral reform referendum ==
2007 Ontario electoral reform referendum
Side	Votes	%
First Past the Post	21,500	60.2
Mixed member proportional	14,201	39.8
Total	35,701	100.0

== Sources ==
- Elections Ontario Past Election Results
