= None of the Above Direct Democracy Party =

Provincial political party in Canada

None of the Above Direct Democracy Party Parti Démocratie Directe Aucune de ces réponses
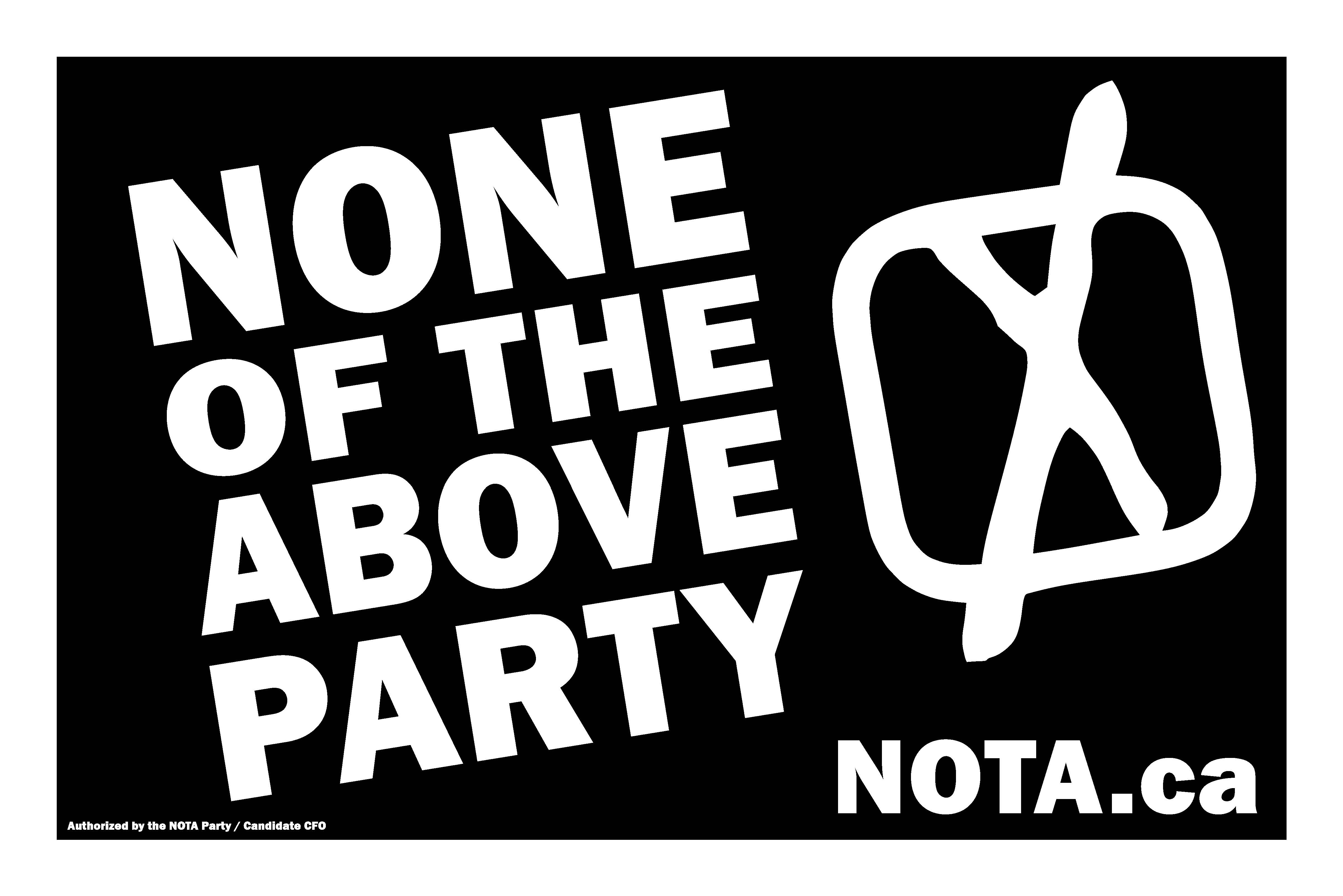
- Abbreviation: NOTA
- Leader: Greg Vezina
- President: Greg Vezina
- Founded: 2014
- Headquarters: Mississauga, Ontario
- Ideology: Direct democracy
- Seats in Legislature: 0 / 124

Website
- nota.ca

The None of the Above Direct Democracy Party (NOTA; French: Parti Démocratie Directe Aucune de ces réponses), formerly and still unofficially called the None of the Above Party (French: Parti Aucune de ces réponses), is a minor political party in the province of Ontario, Canada. It is named after the expression "none of the above" and was founded in 2014 by Greg Vezina in response to his disillusionment with the current major political parties. The party aims to "elect independent MPPs who are not bound by party control and who truly can represent their constituents first". It supports the use of referendums, term limits and recall elections.

NOTA nominated candidates in eight ridings in the 2014 provincial election: Vezina ran in Mississauga—Erindale, Vezina's wife Kathleen ran in Mississauga—Brampton South, Vezina's son Alexander ran in Mississauga—Streetsville, Vezina's brother Matthew ran in Parkdale—High Park, Andrew Weber ran in Mississauga South, Amir Khan ran in Scarborough—Rouge River, John Ringo Beam ran in Niagara Falls, and Bob Lewis ran in Lambton—Kent—Middlesex. None of the candidates gained a seat in the Legislative Assembly of Ontario and the party received 0.09% of the popular vote. The party failed to win any seats in the elections it have fielded candidates.

== Election results ==
Election year	No. of overall votes	% of overall total	No. of candidates run	No. of seats won	+/−	Government
2014	4,247	0.09	8	0 / 107	New Party	Extra-parliamentary
2018	16,191	0.28	42	0 / 124	+0.19	Extra-parliamentary
2022	6,202	0.13	28	0 / 124	-0.15	Extra-parliamentary
2025	4,731	0.09	13	0 / 124	-0.04	Extra-parliamentary

== See also ==
- List of political parties in Ontario
