= Wards of the City of Ottawa =

Municipal wards of Ottawa

Map of Ottawa's wards.

In the city of Ottawa, Ontario, Canada, a ward is an electoral district within the municipality used in local politics to elect members of the Ottawa City Council. Since Ottawa's amalgamation on January 1, 2001, wards have been named after the former cities that comprised the Regional Municipality of Ottawa–Carleton, neighbourhoods, thoroughfares, parishes, landmarks, geographical features and, in some cases, historical figures connected to the area. Wards are numbered typically by how recently they have been created.

As of the 2022 Ottawa municipal election, there are 24 wards which elect members via first-past-the-post to the City Council.

== Current wards ==
#	Name	Population (2021)	Area (km^{2})	Namesake
1	Orléans East-Cumberland Ward	48,680	110.6	Orleans & Cumberland
2	Orléans West-Innes Ward	45,490	63.8	Orleans & Innes Road
3	Barrhaven West Ward	49,670	56.1	Barrhaven
4	Kanata North Ward	41,645	53.0	Kanata
5	West Carleton-March Ward	24,800	1,550.3	West Carleton Twp. & March Twp.
6	Stittsville Ward	45,215	51.8	Stittsville
7	Bay Ward	48,485	132.8	Britannia, Crystal, Graham & Shirleys Bays
8	College Ward	50,315	92.9	Algonquin College
9	Knoxdale-Merivale Ward	39,835	95.6	Knoxdale Road & Merivale Road
10	Gloucester-Southgate Ward	48,700	161.2	Gloucester & Ottawa South
11	Beacon Hill-Cyrville Ward	34,050	39.2	Beacon Hill & Cyrville Road
12	Rideau-Vanier Ward	44,310	18.3	Rideau River & Vanier
13	Rideau-Rockcliffe Ward	37,395	39.0	Rideau River & Rockcliffe Park
14	Somerset Ward	39,795	13.1	Somerset Street
15	Kitchissippi Ward	37,035	23.5	Algonquin name for the Ottawa River
16	River Ward	45,895	48.4	Rideau River
17	Capital Ward	37,020	22.2	Capital of Canada
18	Alta Vista Ward	44,065	40.9	Alta Vista Drive
19	Orléans South-Navan Ward	46,813	399.3	Orleans & Navan
20	Osgoode Ward	29,965	1,245.2	Osgoode Twp.
21	Rideau-Jock Ward	27,045	1,461.2	Rideau Twp. & the Jock River
22	Riverside South-Findlay Creek Ward	32,995	69.5	Riverside South & Findlay Creek
23	Kanata South Ward	49,110	33.9	Kanata
24	Barrhaven East Ward	50,360	27.8	Barrhaven

== Former wards ==
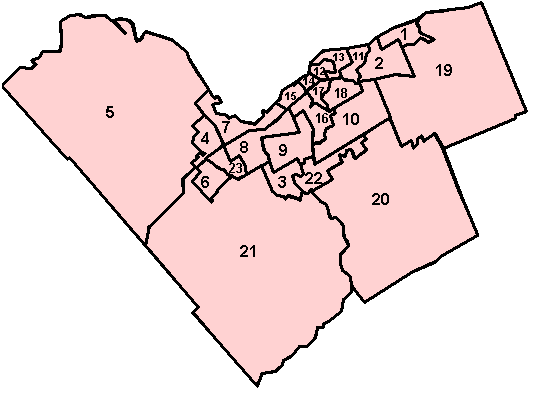
Map of Ottawa's wards from 2014 to 2022.

Name	Created	Abolished	Neighbourhoods
Alta Vista-Canterbury Ward	1994	2000	Alta Vista, Heron Gate, Sheffield Glen, Riverview
Barrhaven Ward	2006	2022	Barrhaven
Baseline Ward	1994 (RC)	2006	City View, Centrepointe, Redwood, Bel-Air, Leslie Park, Briargreen
Bell-South Nepean Ward	1994 (RC)	2006	Bells Corners, Barrhaven
Billings Ward	1980	1994	Heron Park, Heron Gate, Greenboro, South Keys
Britannia Ward	1972	1994	Britannia, Lincoln Heights, Woodroffe North
Britannia-Richmond Ward	1994	2000	Britannia, Lincoln Heights, Woodroffe North, Highland Park, Carlingwood
Bruyère-Strathcona Ward	1994	2000	Sandy Hill, ByWard Market, Lower Town
By Ward	1855	1972	ByWard Market, Lower Town
By-Rideau Ward	1980	1994	Lower Town, ByWard Market, New Edinburgh, Manor Park
By-St. George's Ward	1972	1980	Sandy Hill, Lower Town, ByWard Market
Canterbury Ward	1980	1994	Elmvale Acres, Sheffield Glen, Urbandale, Hawthorne Meadows, Hunt Club Park
Carleton Ward	1950	2000	Redwood, Kenson Park, Bel-Air, Queensway, Britannia
Central Ward	1889	1952	East Downtown Ottawa
Cumberland Ward	2000	2022	Cumberland
Dalhousie Ward	1888	1994	Centretown West
Elmdale Ward	1929	1952	Civic Hospital, Hintonburg
Elmdale-Victoria Ward	1952	1980	Island Park, Carleton Heights
Gloucester Ward	1950	1980	Alta Vista, Heron Gate, Ellwood, Hunt Club
Gloucester-South Nepean Ward	2006	2022	Gloucester and Nepean
Goulbourn Ward	2000	2006	Goulbourn
Innes Ward	1994	2022	Innes Road
Kanata Ward	1994 (RC)	2006	Kanata
Mooney's Bay Ward	1994	2000	Riverside Park, Carleton Heights, Hunt Club, Carlington
Orléans Ward	2000	2022	Orleans
Ottawa Ward	1855	1952	Lower Town
Overbrook-Forbes Ward	1980	1994	Overbrook, Forbes, Carson Grove, Viscount Alexander Park
Queensboro Ward	1956	1994	Westboro, Carlington
Richmond Ward	1980	1994	Highland Park, Woodroffe North, Carlingwood
Rideau Ward	1887	1980	New Edinburgh, Overbrook, Forbes
Rideau Ward (II)	2000	2006	Rideau Twp.
Rideau-Goulbourn Ward	2006	2022	Rideau Twp. and Goulbourn Twp.
Riverdale Ward	1929	1952	Old Ottawa South, Old Ottawa East
Riverside Ward	1980	1994	Riverside Park, Carleton Heights, Hunt Club
Southgate Ward	1994	2000	South Keys, Greenboro, Hunt Club Park
St. George's Ward	1855	1972	Sandy Hill, Old Ottawa East (also 1980 to 1994)
Victoria Ward	1855	1952	LeBreton Flats, Mechanicsville
Wellington Ward	1855	1994	Centretown, Downtown
West Carleton Ward	2000	2006	West Carleton
