= Queensway Terrace North =

Neighbourhood in Ottawa, Canada

- Neighbourhood
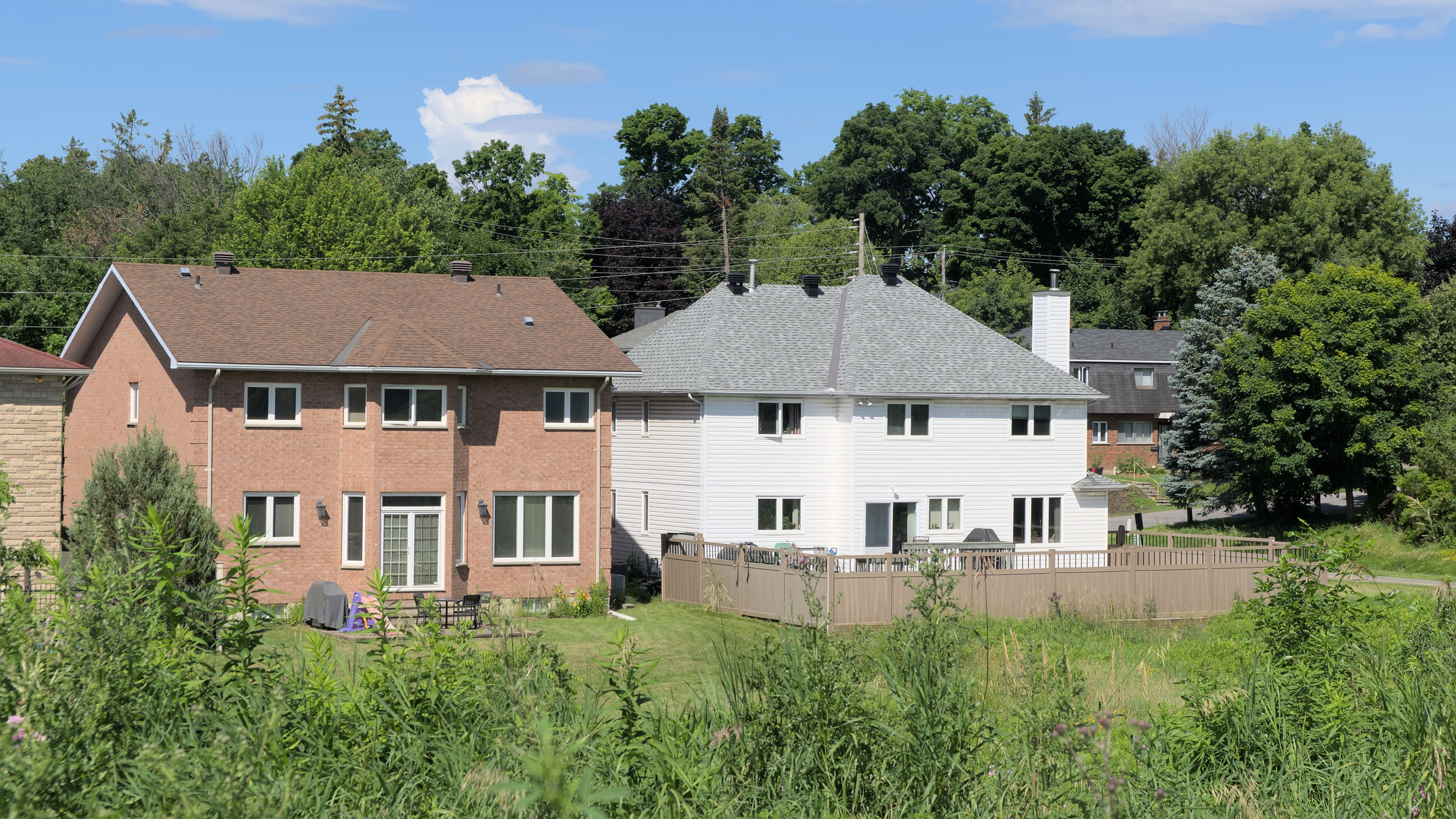
- Connaught Avenue viewed from the Pinecrest Creek Pathway
- Location of Queensway Terrace North
- Coordinates: 45°21′29″N 75°47′12″W
- Country: Canada
- Province: Ontario
- City: Ottawa

Government
  - MPs: Anita Vandenbeld
  - MPPs: Chandra Pasma
  - Councillors: Theresa Kavanagh
  - Governing body: Queensway Terrace North Community Association
  - President: Kathy Vandergrift

Population (2021)
  - Total: 3,160
- Time zone: UTC−5 (EST)
  - Summer (DST): UTC−4 (EDT)
- Forward sortation area: K2B

Queensway Terrace North (QTN) is a neighbourhood in Bay Ward in the west end of Ottawa, Ontario, Canada. Its neighbourhood association is bounded to the north by Carling Avenue, to the west by Pinecrest Road, to the south by the Queensway (Highway 417), and to the east by the Transitway. These boundaries include the adjacent neighbourhood of Britannia Heights.

== History ==
A few people first settled in the neighbourhood in the late 1800s closer to Britannia. Most of the homes, however, were built in the 1950s and 1960s. In 1956 the Campeau Corporation acquired 114 acres of the Arkell farm on Pinecrest Road. By 1958 it was subdivided north of the C.N.R tracks (present day Highway 417) to form Queensway Terrace North. Robert Campeau’s firm completed single family homes on over 300 lots. A lot was reserved for Severn Public School. Together Queensway Terrace North and South were originally one neighbourhood until Highway 417 (part of the Trans-Canada Highway) was completed through the area in the 1960s. Since 2000 a number of semi-detached homes have been built to replace detached homes, especially in the northern section closer to Carling Avenue.

== Transportation ==
Queensway Terrace North is well-served by public transportation with OC Transpo Transitway stations Pinecrest, Lincoln Fields and Queensway on its borders. Major lines 57 and 85 also skirt its northern edge on Carling Avenue. Cycling is also popular as a commuting method owing to the neighbourhood’s direct connections to the NCC pathway network.

Driving is also convenient with four of the city’s major east-west routes (Highway 417, Kichi Zibi Mikan, Carling Avenue, and Richmond Road) all passing to the borders of the neighbourhood. Further, there is rapid access to Pinecrest/Greenbank and Highway 416 southbound.

== Recreation ==
Outdoor recreation is served by the adjoining Frank Ryan Park and Elmhurst Woods. Together they feature wooded paths, baseball diamonds, tennis courts, a basketball court, field house, summer wading pool, and winter skating rink. The neighbourhood is also directly connected to the National Capital Commission pathway network via the Pinecrest Creek section and is close to the Ottawa River and Britannia Beach.

== Business ==
Queensway Terrace North is also home to Queensview Business Park. The park features Leon's, Goodlife fitness gym, an OC Transpo bus garage, and many offices. The neighbourhood is also close to major retail centres Lincoln Fields Mall, Bayshore Shopping Centre, Pinecrest Shopping Mall, IKEA and Carlingwood Shopping Centre.

== Education ==
The only active school within the borders of Queensway Terrace North is Severn Avenue Public School. As of 2017 it has become a French immersion school and offers a daycare program.

Grant Alternative School (formerly Grant Public School) is a heritage site. The school was built in 1922 and closed in 1987. The school re-opened as an alternative school from 1991 to 2007. The building has been renovated and reopened in 2020 as a Francophone community centre including a daycare and public meeting space.
