= Lincoln Fields =

Lincoln Fields may refer to:

- Lincoln Fields Race Track
- Lincoln Fields Shopping Centre
- Lincoln Fields Station
- Lincoln Heights, Ottawa
