= Woodpark, Ottawa =

Neighbourhood in Ottawa, Ontario, Canada

Coordinates: 45.370°N 75.777°W

Woodpark
- Neighbourhood
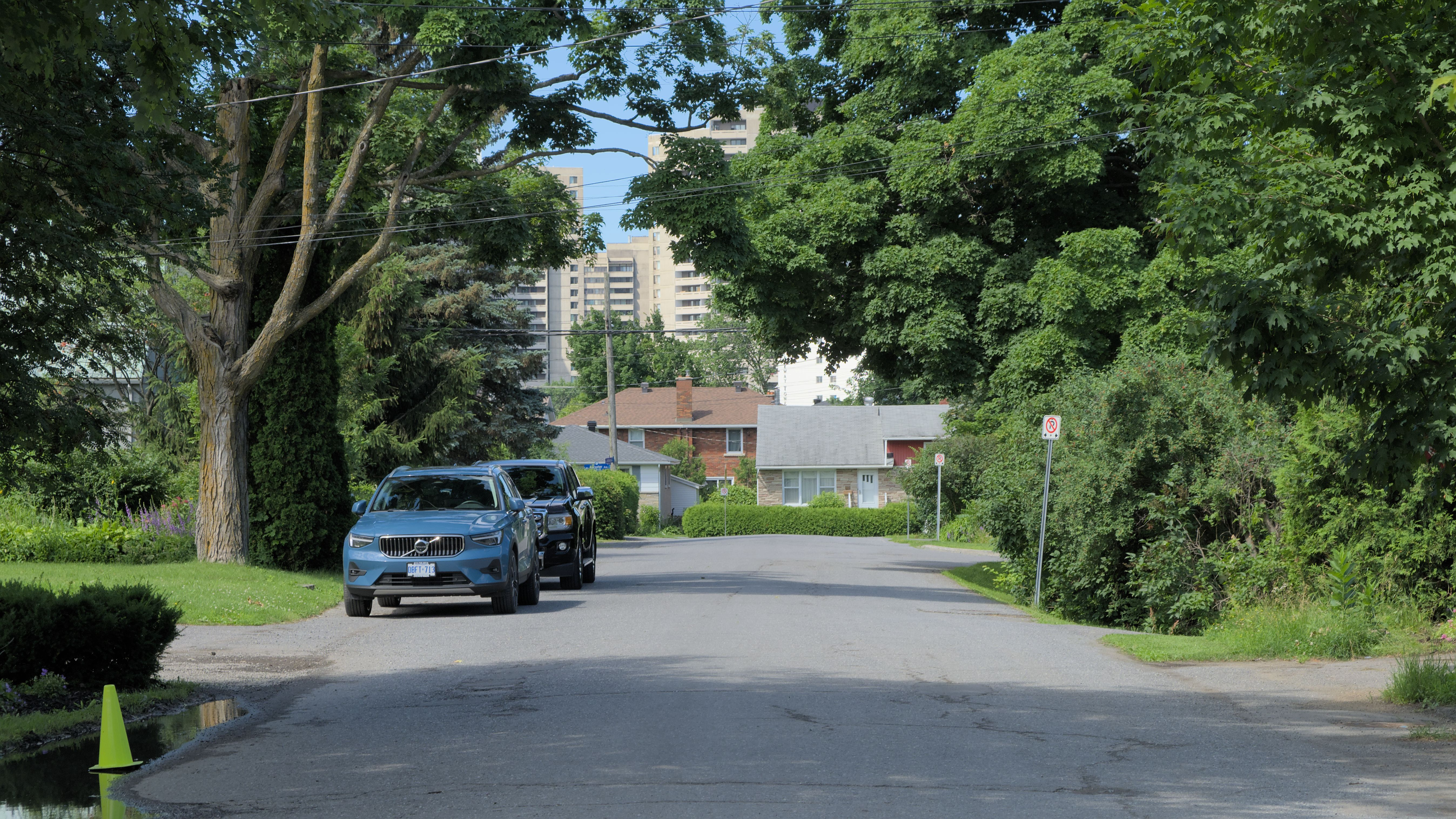
- Anthony Avenue
- Location of Woodpark
- Country: Canada
- Province: Ontario
- City: Ottawa

Government
  - MPs: Anita Vandenbeld
  - MPPs: Chandra Pasma
  - Councillors: Theresa Kavanagh

Population (2021)
  - Total: 2,306
- Time zone: UTC−5 (EST)
  - Summer (DST): UTC−4 (EDT)
- Website: https://www.woodpark.ca

Woodpark is a small neighbourhood in Bay Ward, in the west end of Ottawa, Ontario, Canada. It is bounded in the north by Richmond Road, to the East by Woodroffe Avenue north, in the South by Carling Avenue and in the west by the Kichi Zibi Mikan. The total population of the neighbourhood according to the Canada 2021 Census was 2,306.

It is largely residential with commercial only on Carling Avenue and a small portion of Woodroffe. There is only one small park, New Orchard Park, within its boundaries, but both the Parkway and part of the Byron Strip are adjacent to it. It has no schools and one church. The church is the Ottawa Reformed Presbyterian Church located at 466 Woodland Ave.

The community was built in the 1940s and 1950s. Many apartments and condominiums were built in the 1970s on McEwen and Ambleside Drive just north of Richmond Road, an area known as Ambleside.

Woodpark is served by buses on Carling, Woodroffe and Richmond Road, and is adjacent to the Carlingwood Shopping Centre.

It is very close the NCC bike path along the Ottawa River.

This neighbourhood is also home to former Ottawa mayor Jim Watson.

== See also ==
- List of Ottawa neighbourhoods

== External reference ==
- Woodpark Community Association website
