= Woodpark =

Woodpark may refer to the following places:

- Woodpark, New South Wales, Australia
- Woodpark, Ottawa, Canada
