= Whitehaven, Ottawa =

Coordinates: 45°21′50″N 75°46′30″W

Whitehaven
- Neighbourhood
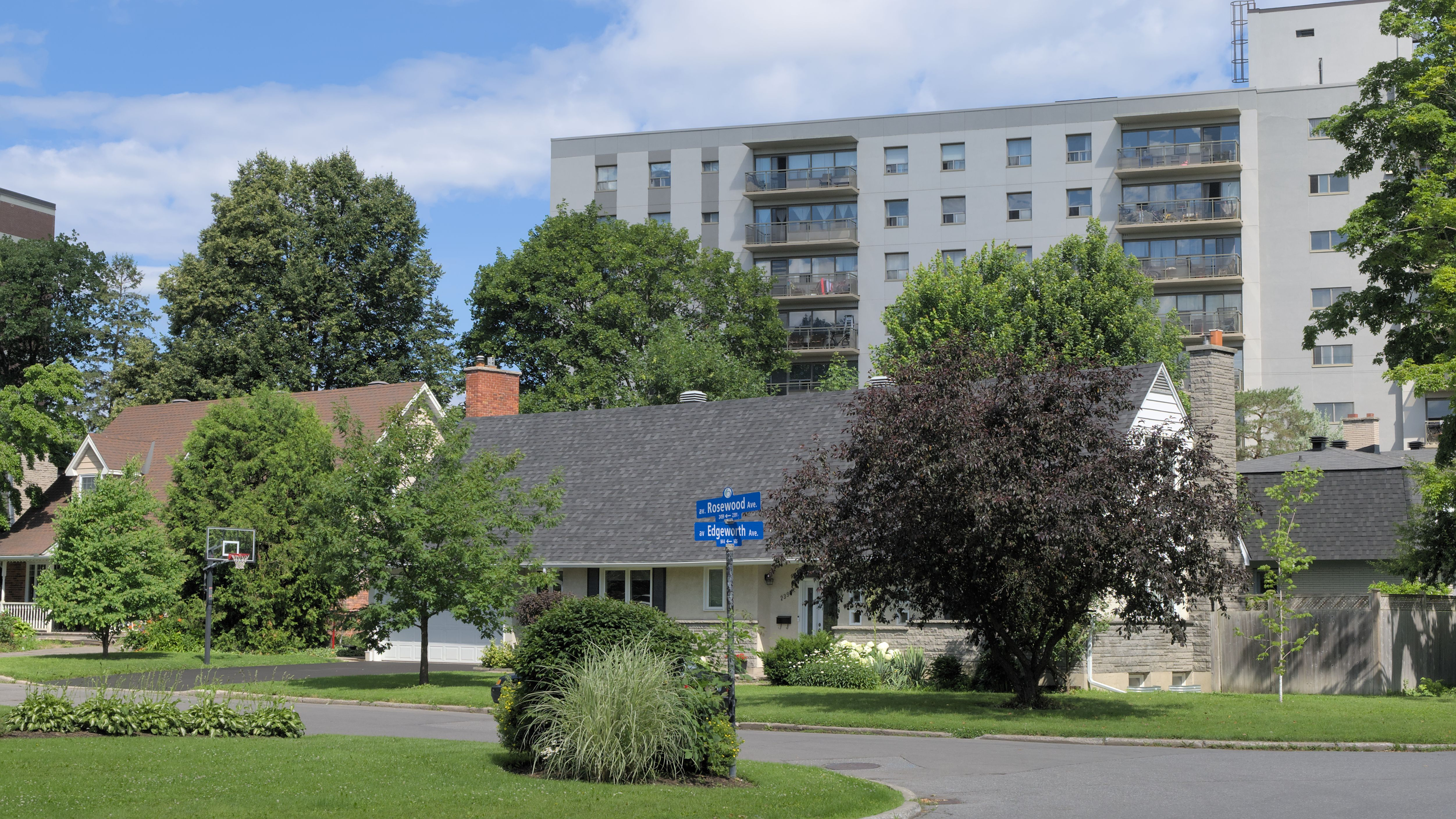
- Rosewood Avenue
- Location of Whitehaven
- Country: Canada
- Province: Ontario
- City: Ottawa

Government
  - MPs: Anita Vandenbeld
  - MPPs: Chandra Pasma
  - Councillors: Theresa Kavanagh

Population (2021)
  - Total: 2,323
- Time zone: UTC−5 (EST)
  - Summer (DST): UTC−4 (EDT)

Whitehaven (also spelled White Haven) is a neighbourhood located in Bay Ward in the west end of Ottawa, Ontario, Canada, about 10 kilometres west of downtown. It is bounded by Carling Avenue to the north, Woodroffe Avenue to the east, the OC Transpo Transitway to the west and Highway 417 to the south. As of 2021, the population of the neighbourhood is 2323.

Whitehaven was developed on the lands of Fox farm starting in the 1950s. The Fox farm homestead can still be found on Fox Crescent in the north part of the neighbourhood with its windmill tower now shaded by a large tree. Originally the east side of the neighbourhood was subdivided into large lots, typically 50 by 50 metres. In the 1960s, the west side was developed with smaller lots but mostly large custom homes. At the same time, many lots in the east side of the neighbourhood were subdivided and infill housing was built. Subdivisions have continued through to today, giving Whitehaven a very eclectic housing character. Whitehaven Crescent was built up throughout the mid 1960s as the area's namesake.

The south west side of the neighbourhood contains a large park with a playground, with schools including D. Roy Kennedy Public School and Woodroffe High School. In the 1960s there was also a public primary school which operated until 1999 called Whitehaven Public School. It was closed for a few years after much dispute and then was reopened and expanded as a French primary school, called Terre des Jeunes.

Whitehaven has plenty of transportation links, green space and shopping centres. The Carlingwood and Lincoln Fields shopping malls are within walking distance of the neighbourhood. Both shopping centres are serviced extensively by OC Transpo with Lincoln Fields being serviced by the Lincoln Fields Transit Station on the Transitway

Whitehaven is also connected locally to a network of bike paths with direct access to downtown Ottawa.
