= Queensway Station =

Queensway station may refer to:

- Queensway tube station, London, United Kingdom
- Queensway station (OC Transpo), Ottawa, Canada
