= Britannia Heights =

- Neighbourhood
- Location in Ottawa
- Coordinates: 45.361102°N 75.79168°W
- Country: Canada
- Province: Ontario
- City: Ottawa

Government
  - Mayor: Jim Watson

Area
  - Total: 1.135 km^{2} (0.438 sq mi)
- Canada 2006 Census
- Time zone: UTC−5 (Eastern (EST))
  - Summer (DST): UTC−4 (EDT)

Britannia Heights is a neighbourhood in Bay Ward in west end of Ottawa, Ontario, Canada. The neighbourhood is a sub-neighbourhood of Britannia area of the city, but is within the Queensway Terrace North Community Association boundaries. The neighbourhood is away from the Ottawa River on a steep hill. It is bounded to the North by Carling Avenue, east by OC Transpo Transitway, south by Henley Street, and west by Bayshore Drive. The population of the neighbourhood is approximately 1750.

The first land entrepreneur in the community was William Mosgrove whose registered plan in 1908 paved the way for 47 average-sized lots on Pinecrest Road and a parallel street named St. Louis (now Pinewood Crescent.)

Most of the homes were built between the 1930s to the 1960s. After 1970, many townhouses and condominiums were built until the 1980s.

The main streets of the neighbourhood are Richmond, Carling, Alpine, Connaught and Pinecrest. Britannia Heights United Church is on Pinecrest Drive.

The community is home to Frank Ryan Park and the Old Forge.

== Education ==
Grant Alternative School (formerly Grant Public School) is now a heritage site of Ottawa. The school was built in 1922 and closed in 1987. The school re-opened as an alternative school in 1991 and closed in 2007. As of 2013, the school will be renovated into a Francophone community center for the growth population of French people and a nursing home as well. It will also be part of a campus for La Cite Collegiate.
