= Ward (electoral subdivision) =

Subdivision of a local government unit, used for electoral purposes

A ward is a local authority area, typically used for electoral purposes. In some countries, wards are usually named after neighbourhoods, thoroughfares, parishes, landmarks, geographical features and in some cases historical figures connected to the area (e.g. William Morris Ward in the London Borough of Waltham Forest, England). It is common in the United States for wards to simply be numbered.

== Origins ==
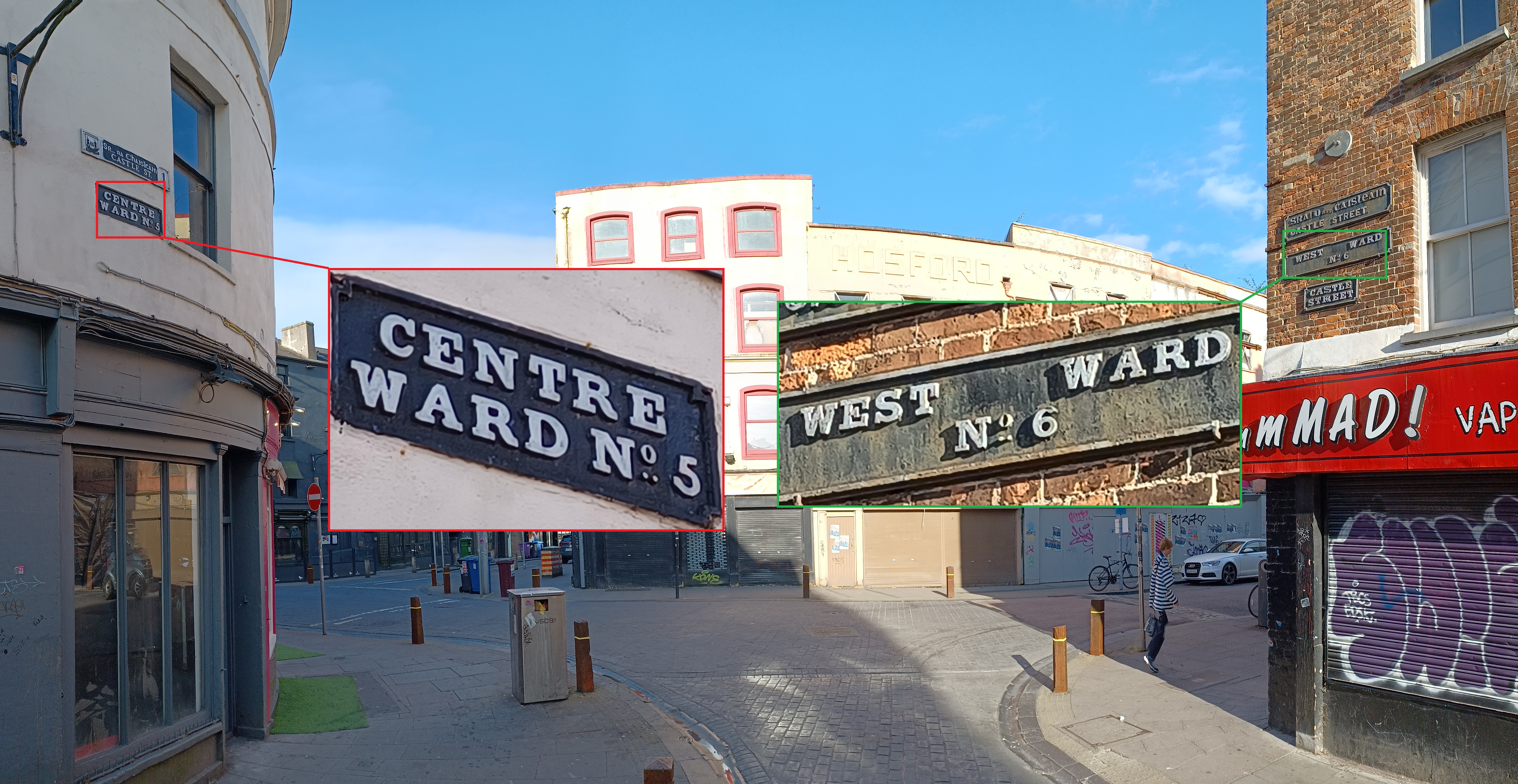
Centre (No. 5) and West (No. 6) wards in Cork, Ireland, were defined in 1853 and last used for elections in 1914. The boundary ran down the middle of Castle Street, where nameplates remained in site in 2022.

The word "ward", for an electoral subdivision, appears to have originated in the Wards of the City of London, where gatherings for each ward known as "wardmotes" have taken place since the 12th century. The word was much later applied to divisions of other cities and towns in England and Wales and Ireland.

In parts of northern England, a ward was an administrative subdivision of a county, very similar to a hundred in other parts of England.

== Present day ==
In Australia, Canada, New Zealand, South Africa, Sri Lanka, the United Kingdom, and the United States, wards are an electoral district, within a district or municipality, used in local government elections. In the United States, wards are usually subdivided into precincts for polling purposes. It remains the nomenclature in Wisconsin for what is now known as an electoral precinct elsewhere in the United States.

In East Africa, the word ward used in English is translated into Swahili/Kiswahili as Kata.

In the case of a municipal amalgamation, the former cities and towns that make up the new metropolis may be referred to as wards.

In Monaco, wards are informal divisions of the country, grouped into quartiers.

== Asia ==
In some cities of India, such as Mumbai and Delhi, a ward is an administrative unit of the city region; a city area is divided into zones, which in turn contain numerous wards. The smallest administrative unit of Gram Panchayats in India is also known as a ward. In Bangladesh wards are subdivisions of a city or town which administrates under City Corporations and municipalities (pourashova)

== Ireland ==
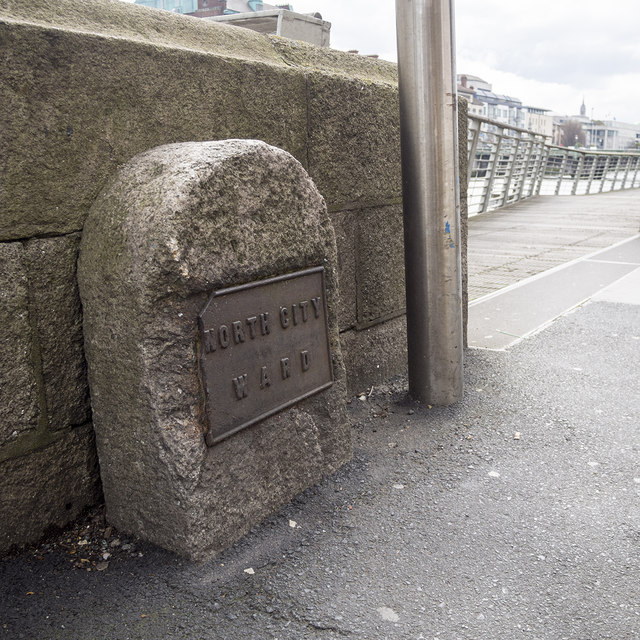
Boundary marker in Dublin of the North City Ward

In the Republic of Ireland, urban divisions were called wards (Irish: bardaí) and rural ones were called district electoral divisions. Both were renamed as electoral divisions in 1996. The electoral districts for Irish local authorities are local electoral areas. These are generally defined as combinations of electoral divisions, and in urban areas were formally described as combination of wards.

Following the vote for the Dublin City (UK Parliament constituency) candidate in the 1865 United Kingdom general election, the results were published in a book broken down by ward and district in the city.

== Similar concepts in other languages ==
In Japan, a ku (or 区 in Japanese writing) is an administrative unit of one of the larger cities, closely equivalent to the divisions or wards of a London Borough or a New York Borough.

In Vietnam, a phường is an administrative subunit of an inner city district, or quận. Wards and electoral divisions of Nepal are political divisions which are grouped into Gaunpalika (Rural Municipality. A rural municipality or municipality has minimum of five and maximum of 33 divisions.

In Italy, further traditional subdivisions of municipalities are called rioni (meaning region), quartieri (meaning quarter), borghi (meaning borough) or contrade (meaning country), all without a peculiar definition and without a juridical value.

== See also ==
- Undivided council
- Wards of Canada
  - Wards of the City of Ottawa
  - Wards of Lake Country municipality
- Wards of Japan
- Wards and electoral divisions of the United Kingdom
  - Wards of the City of London
- Wards of Tanzania
- Ward (United States)
  - For more controversial/negative practices often associated with ward politics, also see political machine.
  - Wards of New York City
  - Wards of New Orleans
  - Wards of Houston
- Wards of Zimbabwe
