= Westboro, Ottawa =

Neighbourhood in Ontario, Canada

Westboro
- Neighbourhood
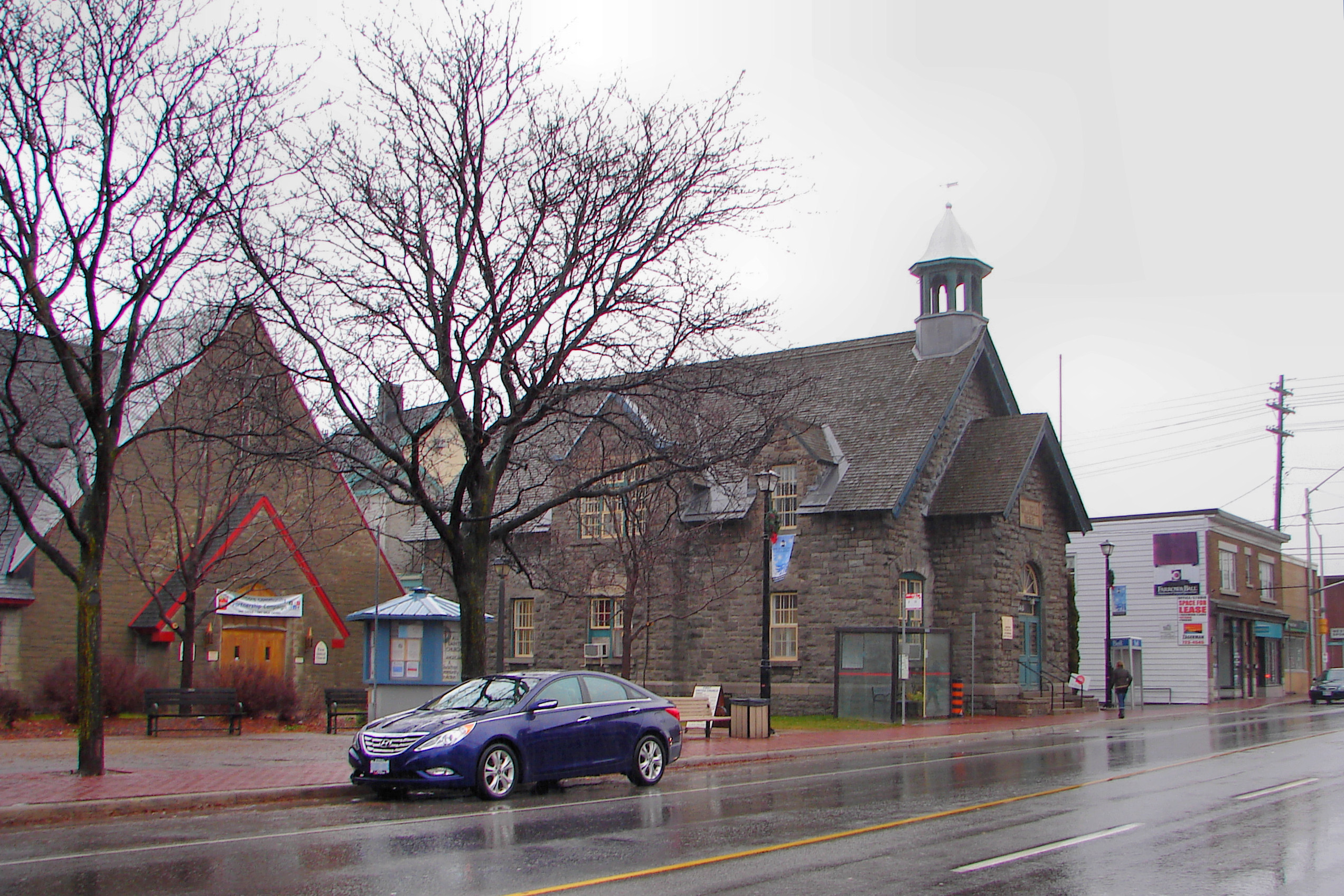
- Former Westboro Town Hall

- Location in Ottawa
- Coordinates: 45°23′50″N 75°44′36″W
- Country: Canada
- Province: Ontario
- City: Ottawa
- Established: 19th Century
- Incorporated: 1905 (Police Village of Westboro)
- Annexation: 1949 (City of Ottawa)

Government
  - MPs: Yasir Naqvi, Anita Vandenbeld
  - MPPs: Catherine McKenney, Chandra Pasma
  - Councillors: Jeff Leiper, Theresa Kavanagh
- Elevation: 70 m (230 ft)

Population (2016)
  - Total: 22,725
- Canada 2016 Census
- Time zone: UTC−5 (Eastern (EST))
  - Summer (DST): UTC−4 (EDT)

Westboro (often referred to as Westboro Village) is an area in the west end of Ottawa, Ontario, Canada. Located along the Ottawa River, Island Park Drive defines Westboro's eastern border, while the Ottawa River defines its northern border. Under this definition, the population of the area is 22,725 (2016 Census).

Its community association boundaries are the Transitway to the north, Tweedsmuir Avenue to the east, Carling Avenue to the south and Denbury Avenue to the west. This area excludes the neighbourhood of Westboro Beach, whose community association borders include the area immediately north of Westboro, west of Island Park Drive.

== History ==
The neighbourhood got its start in the late nineteenth century, when published flyers proclaimed "Move to Westboro", and offered prospective residents "views of the Laurentian Mountains". This slightly creative name for the distant geological formation along the Eardley Escarpment is now better known as the Gatineau Hills, which are visible across the Ottawa River.

Nineteenth-century descriptions of the neighbourhood refer to its location along the Macadam Road to Bells Corners. That road is now known as Richmond Road, and where it slices through Westboro it is the commercial heart of the village-like neighbourhood, once the centre of the old Nepean Township. The old Town Hall on Richmond Road once housed the bell that later became the symbol of the former city of Nepean, now a part of the city of Ottawa, Ontario. The Maplelawn Garden, boasting the second oldest building in Ottawa (built in 1831) and designated a National Historic Site, is located at the western edge of the village.

The other prominent street in Westboro Village is Churchill Avenue, which was known as Main Street, but was renamed in honour of Winston Churchill following World War II. A few blocks to the west, another street was originally named River Road since it bisected the neighbourhood and led down to the beach on the Ottawa River. That street was renamed Roosevelt Avenue for similar reasons post WW II. Westboro's integration into Ottawa, which already had streets named River Road and Main Street, also prompted the street renaming.

Westboro existed as a police village from 1903 until 1949, when Ottawa annexed it. An Ottawa streetcar line ran along what is now a narrow grass park along Byron Avenue, bringing Ottawa residents to an area once considered cottage country. Many cottage-like residences still exist today, especially by the Ottawa River north of Scott Street.

The Westboro War Memorial Association erected a memorial cenotaph that same park between Richmond Road and Byron Avenue. Unveiled on June 8, 1985, the cenotaph is dedicated to the memory of the fallen members of Westboro and surrounding area who made the supreme sacrifice in The Great War, The Second World War, and the Korea War.

== Housing ==
Most houses in Westboro were built between 1900 and 1960. 71% of the houses are detached.

== Today ==
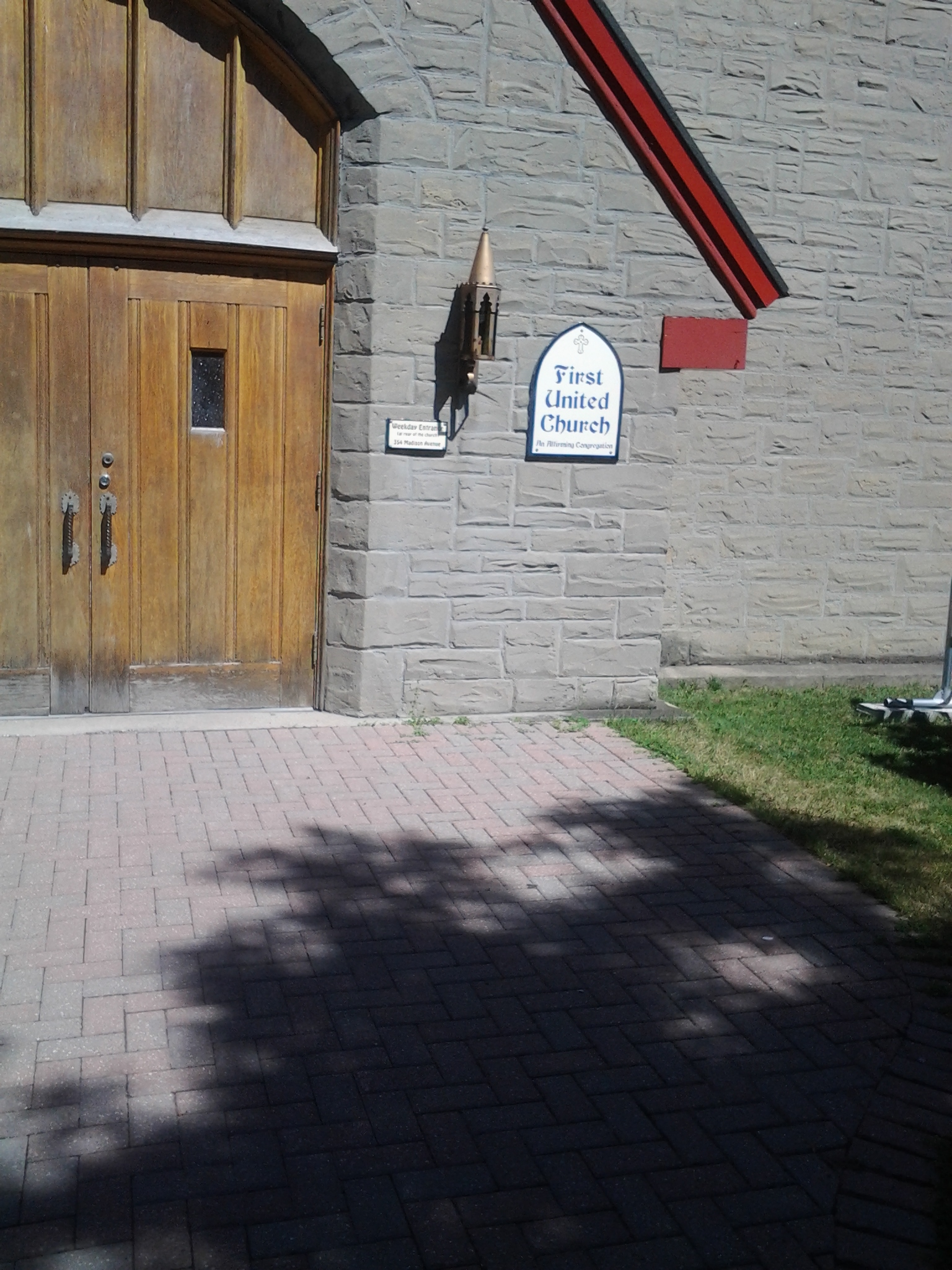
First United Church in Westboro

Westboro is known for its outdoor urban culture and walkable neighbourhoods and downtown area. Several condominium projects are encouraging densification and promising to bring more people to the neighbourhood. The village features murals painted by local artists. The neighbourhood also boasts a concentration of outdoors and sport stores including Mountain Equipment Co-op and Vancouver-based Lululemon Athletica. and is close to cycling trails and whitewater rapids in the Ottawa River. The influx of these outdoor and sports stores, along with a number of boutiques, restaurants and coffee shops on Richmond Road are a significant contributor to the gentrification that Westboro underwent in the 2000s.

Two OC Transpo stations serve Westboro: Westboro and Dominion. Routes 11 and 16 provide frequent local bus service along Richmond Road.

Westfest, a free Canadian arts and music festival, was held in Westboro from 2004 to 2015 during the second weekend in June, and featured a variety of local and national performers. It has now been moved to Laroche Park in Ottawa's Mechanicsville area. In August, one weekend is dedicated to the Fuse Street Festival, which is located on Richmond Road. Fuse Street Festival celebrates Westboro's unique dining experience with added fun of music and festivities.

== Adjacent neighbourhoods ==
Westboro is located in the western part of Ottawa, and borders many other neighbourhoods. Apart from the core Westboro village located north of Richmond Road, the following neighbourhoods are located nearby :

- Carlingwood
- Hampton Park
- Highland Park
- Island Park
- Laurentian View
- McKellar Park
- McKellar Heights
- Mechanicsville
- Wellington Village
- Westboro Beach
- Woodroffe North
- Wellington West

== Notable residents ==
- Eddie MacCabe, sports journalist and writer
- Bruce Cockburn, singer-songwriter and guitarist

== See also ==
- List of Ottawa neighbourhoods
- Westfest
- St George's Church (Ottawa)
