= Woodroffe North =

Neighbourhood in Ottawa

Coordinates: 45.37998°N 75.77578°W

- Neighbourhood
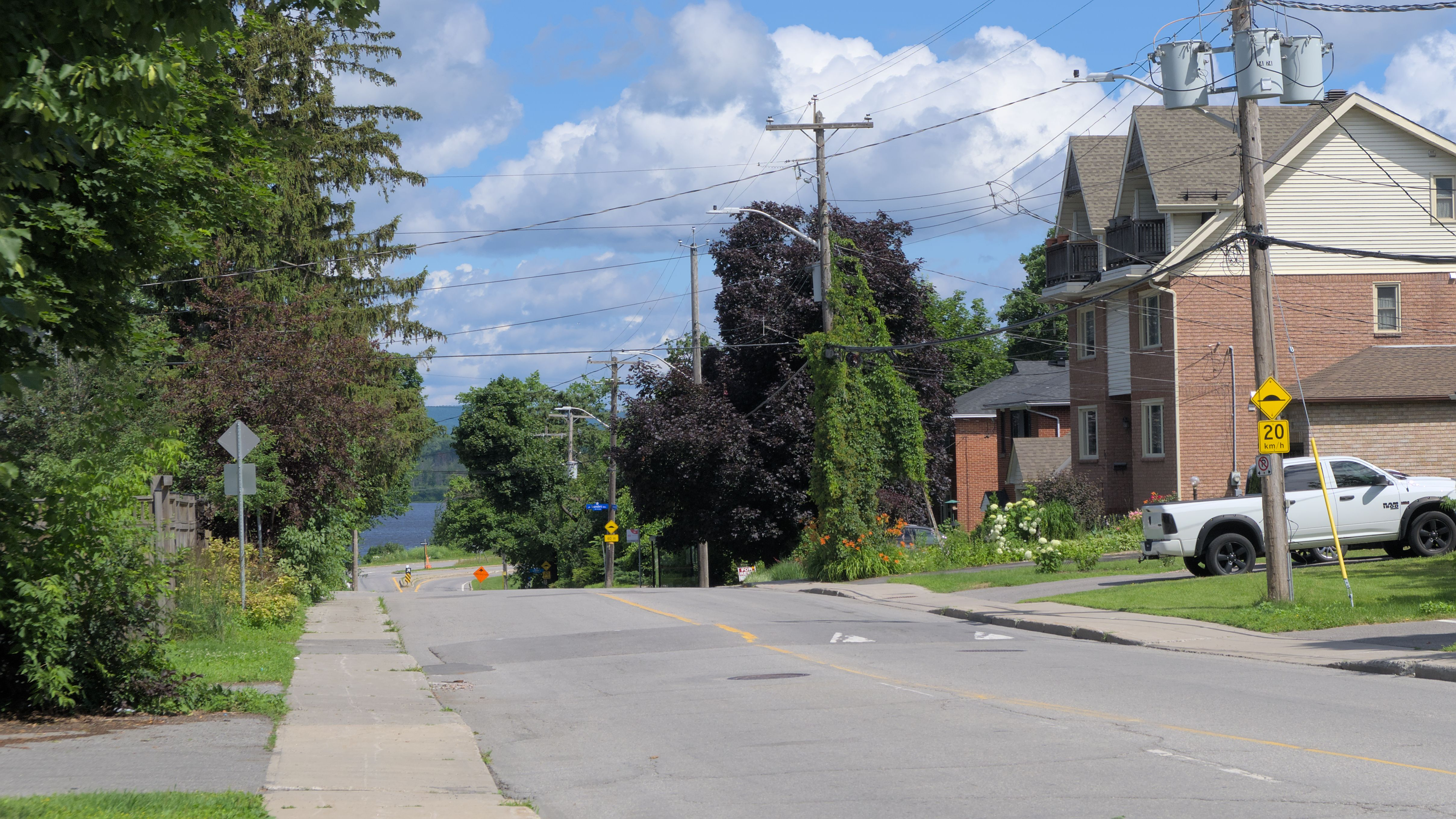
- Woodroffe Avenue
- Location of Woodroffe North
- Country: Canada
- Province: Ontario
- City: Ottawa

Government
  - MPs: Anita Vandenbeld
  - MPPs: Chandra Pasma
  - Councillors: Theresa Kavanagh
- Time zone: UTC−5 (EST)
  - Summer (DST): UTC−4 (EDT)

Woodroffe North (also known as just Woodroffe) is a neighbourhood in Bay Ward in the west end of Ottawa, Ontario, Canada. It is bounded on the south by Richmond Road, on the west by Pooler Avenue, on the north by the Ottawa River and on the east by the northern prolongation of Sherbourne Avenue. Woodroffe North has also been referred to as a community within the neighbourhood of Westboro (also known as Westboro Village) which claims its western border to be Woodroffe Avenue. The Woodroffe North Community includes residents that live on streets west of Woodroffe Avenue. Originally, the homes used to be cottages similar to those in Britannia. Most of the cottages were demolished and changed into houses. Lockhart Avenue is split up at Richmond Road and continues at Byron and ends at Saville Row in front of Carlingwood.

The area west of New Orchard Avenue is known as Ambleside.

== See also ==
- List of Ottawa neighbourhoods
