= St George's Church (Ottawa) =

Roman Catholic parish in Ottawa, Canada

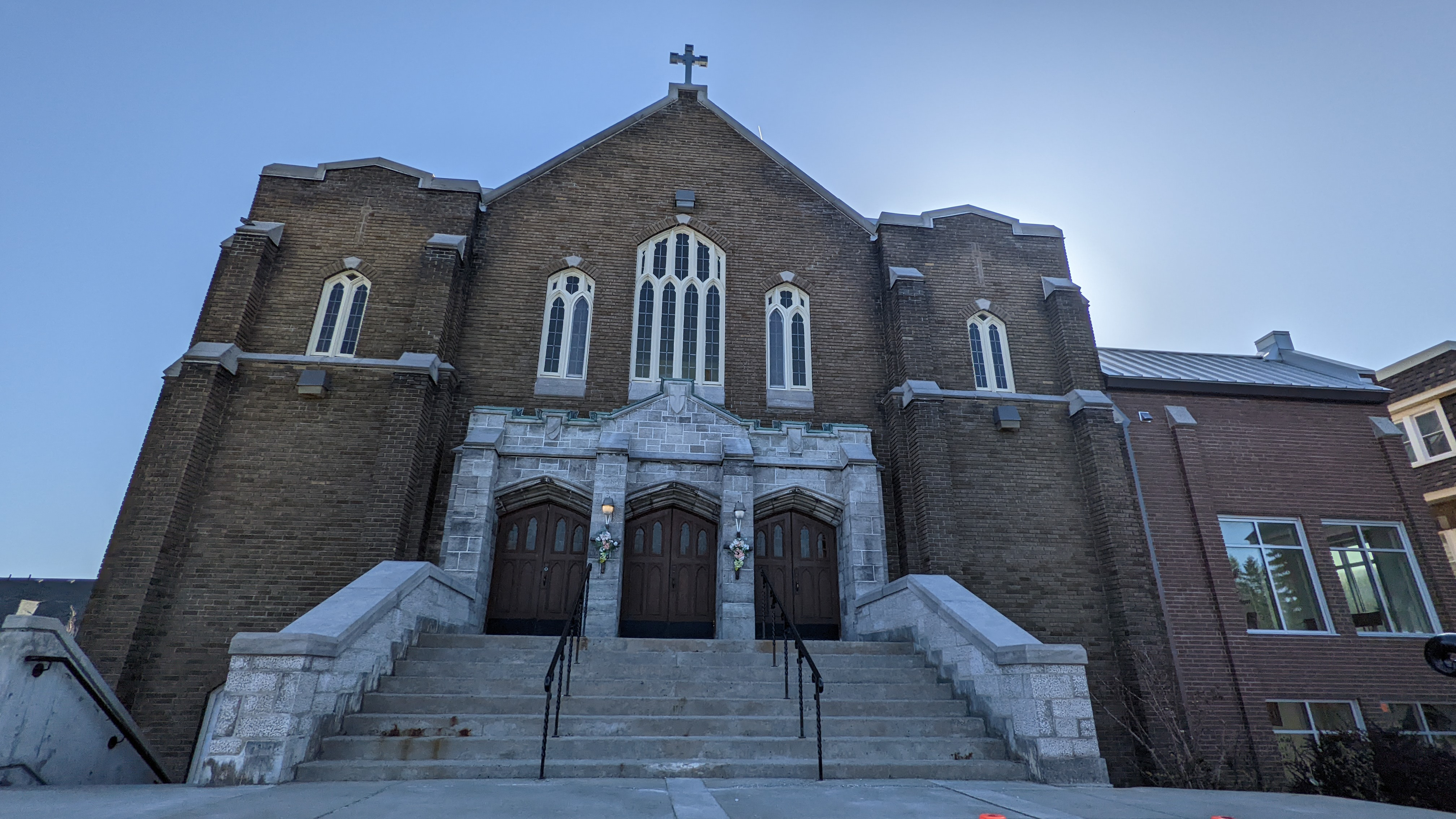
The church's façade

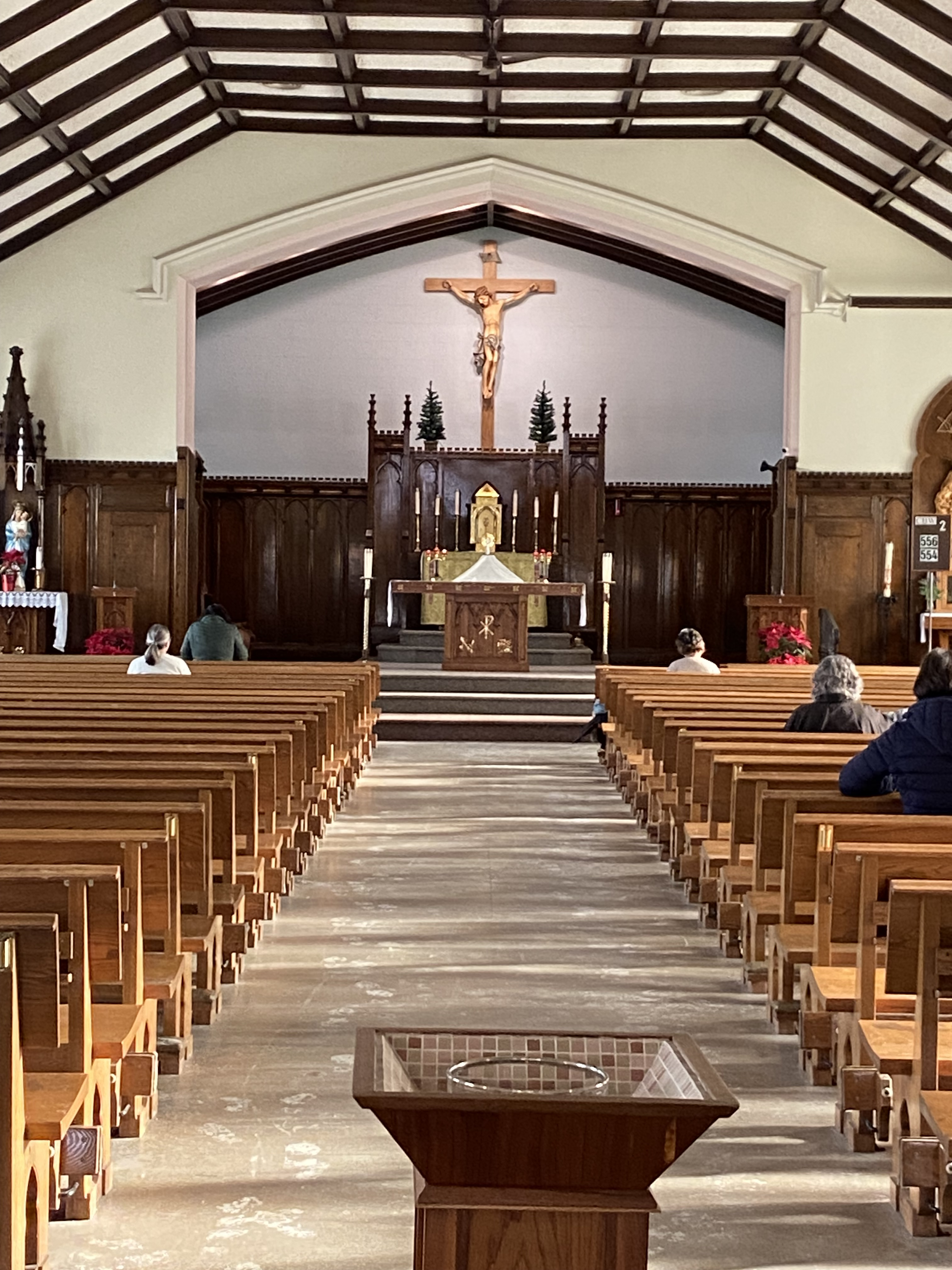
Interior of St George's Church (Ottawa)

St George's Church is the parish for the English speaking Catholics in Westboro/West Wellington Village, within the city and archdiocese of Ottawa. The parish of St George was founded in 1923, its territory carved out of St Mary's Parish. It has become the home of Ottawa's growing Eritrean Catholic community.

== History ==
George Prudhomme was the first pastor, and the parish was named for his patron saint.

Starting on 30 September 1923, masses were celebrated at the Sisters of the Visitation Convent. The parish rented the convent chapel for a year until a new church was built. The convent remains as a heritage building.

St George's foundations were laid in 1923. In 1924 the church bell was officially blessed. It was manufactured in Troy, New York and weighs 600 lbs. The church was officially inaugurated in 1924 by Joseph-Ménard Émard, Archbishop of Ottawa but it was not consecrated until 1998. In 2014, a large building project was finished with facilities including a new parish hall.
