= Baseline station =

Baseline
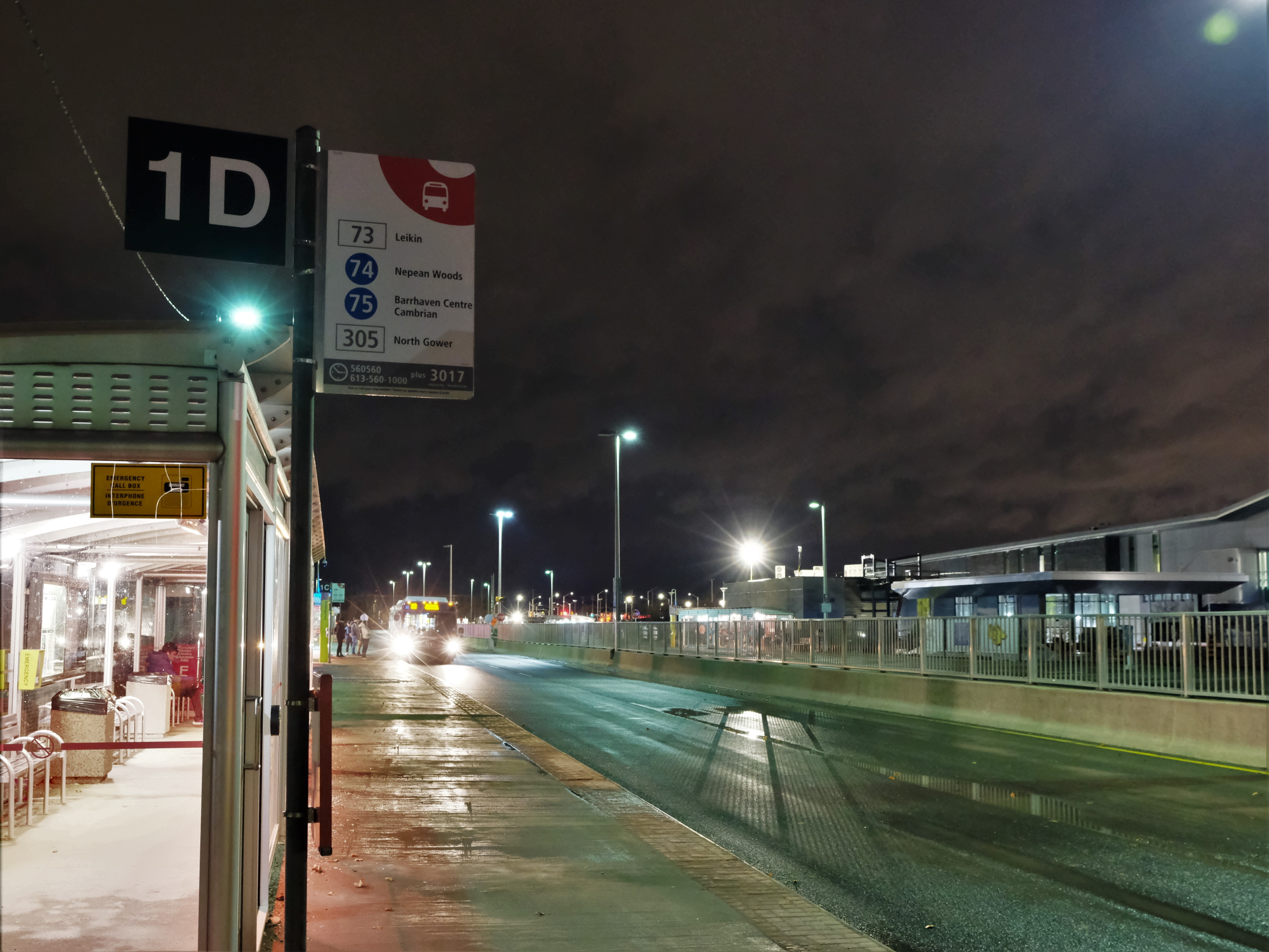

General information
- Other names: Algonquin station (O-Train)
- Location: Ottawa, Ontario; Canada
- Coordinates: 45°20′51″N 75°45′39″W
- Owner: OC Transpo

Construction
- Structure type: At-grade (Transitway station); Underground (LRT station)

History
- Opened: 1984 (original station); October 1, 2009 (temporary location); 2027 (O-Train)

Services
Preceding station	OC Transpo	Following station
Fallowfield toward Limebank	Route 74	Iris toward Tunney's Pasture
Fallowfield toward Cambrian	Route 75	Iris toward Tunney's Pasture

Future services
Preceding station	OC Transpo	Following station
Terminus	Line 1 Opens 2027	Iris toward Trim
Location

Baseline station (Transitway) or Algonquin station (O-Train) is a public transit station directly across from the main campus of Algonquin College in Ottawa's west end, near the intersection of Woodroffe Avenue and Baseline Road. Several residential and business areas such as Centrepointe and College Square are also served by this station.

It is also a major transfer point for communities in the inner southwest part of Ottawa, making it one of the busiest stations. A small park and ride is also located here, which was the terminus for route 95 for many years until it was extended to Barrhaven. After this station, Route 74 and 75 buses leave the Transitway to travel on reserved bus lanes on Woodroffe Avenue, and re-enter the Transitway at the Nepean Sportsplex. Baseline station was the first station to be constructed in 1983 when the Transitway was undergoing initial construction.

== Expansion ==
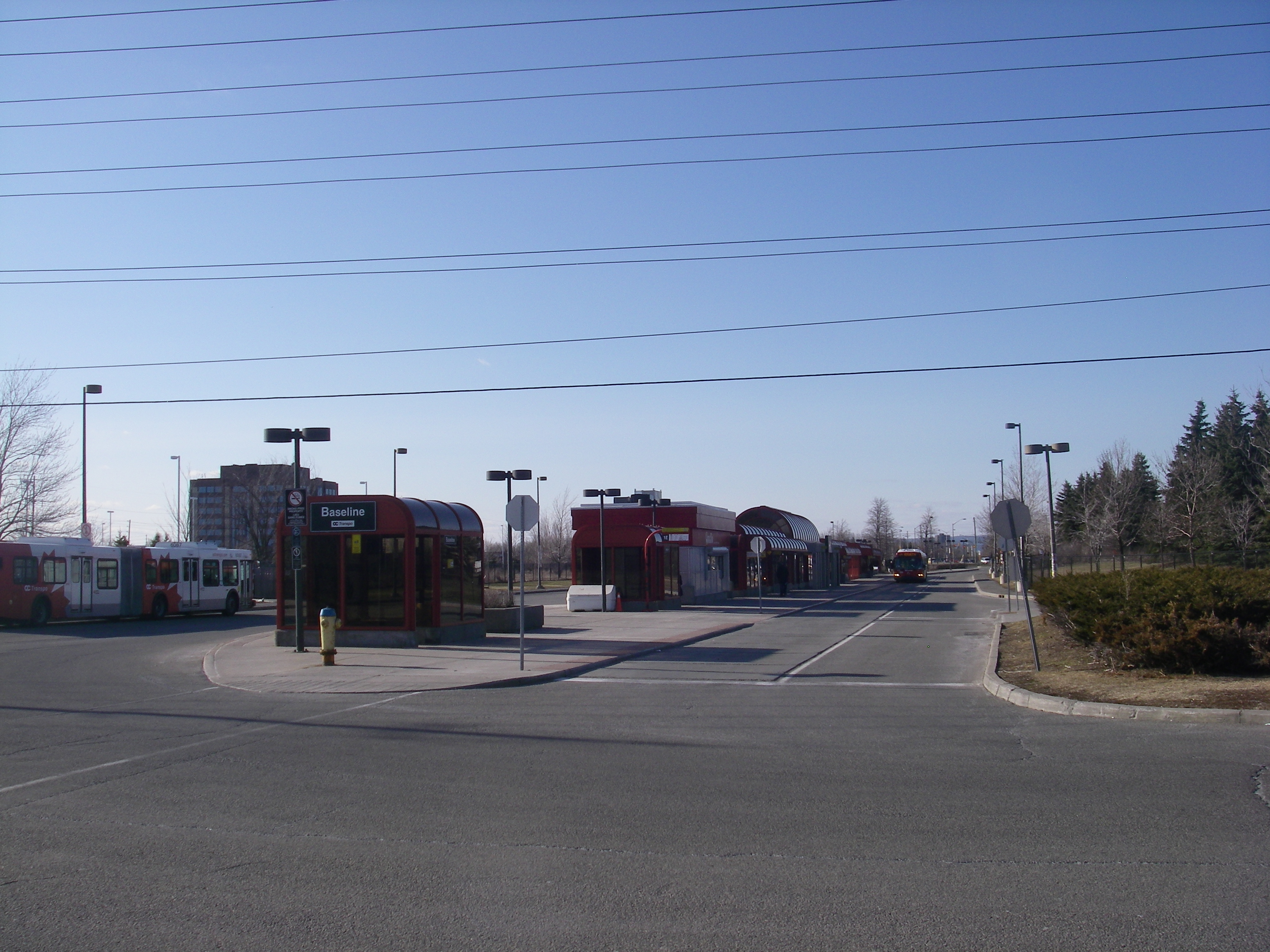
The original Baseline station, prior to moving

Baseline station has undergone a series of renovations, as part of the expansion of the Southwest Transitway, expansion of Algonquin College and future proofing for the expansion of O-Train Line 1. The current station involved the construction of a temporary station west of the original station, making room for the new Algonquin Centre for Construction Excellence (ACCE). The ultimate concept for the updated BRT station loop south of the LRT station will allow passengers to transfer from buses when the Line 1 extension is completed in 2027.

=== Phase 1A (May 2009 – August 2011) ===
- Relocated the station west to permit the construction of the now operational Algonquin Centre for Construction Excellence (ACCE) and constructed new connections with Woodroffe Avenue (completed)
- Constructed an underpass beneath Navaho Drive, west of Woodroffe Avenue (completed)
- Construct an underpass beneath College Avenue, west of Woodroffe Avenue (completed?)
- Relocate the 1 200 mm-diameter water main at Navaho Drive (completed?)
- Constructed a tunnel underneath the footprint of Baseline station and ACCE, between Navaho Drive and College Avenue, with the dimensions conducive for either an underground BRT station or an underground LRT station, including necessary sewer work (completed)
- Constructed the Woodroffe Avenue Pedestrian Bridge between the existing Algonquin College's existing B Building on the east side of Woodroffe Avenue with the now open ACCE on the west side of Woodroffe Avenue (completed)

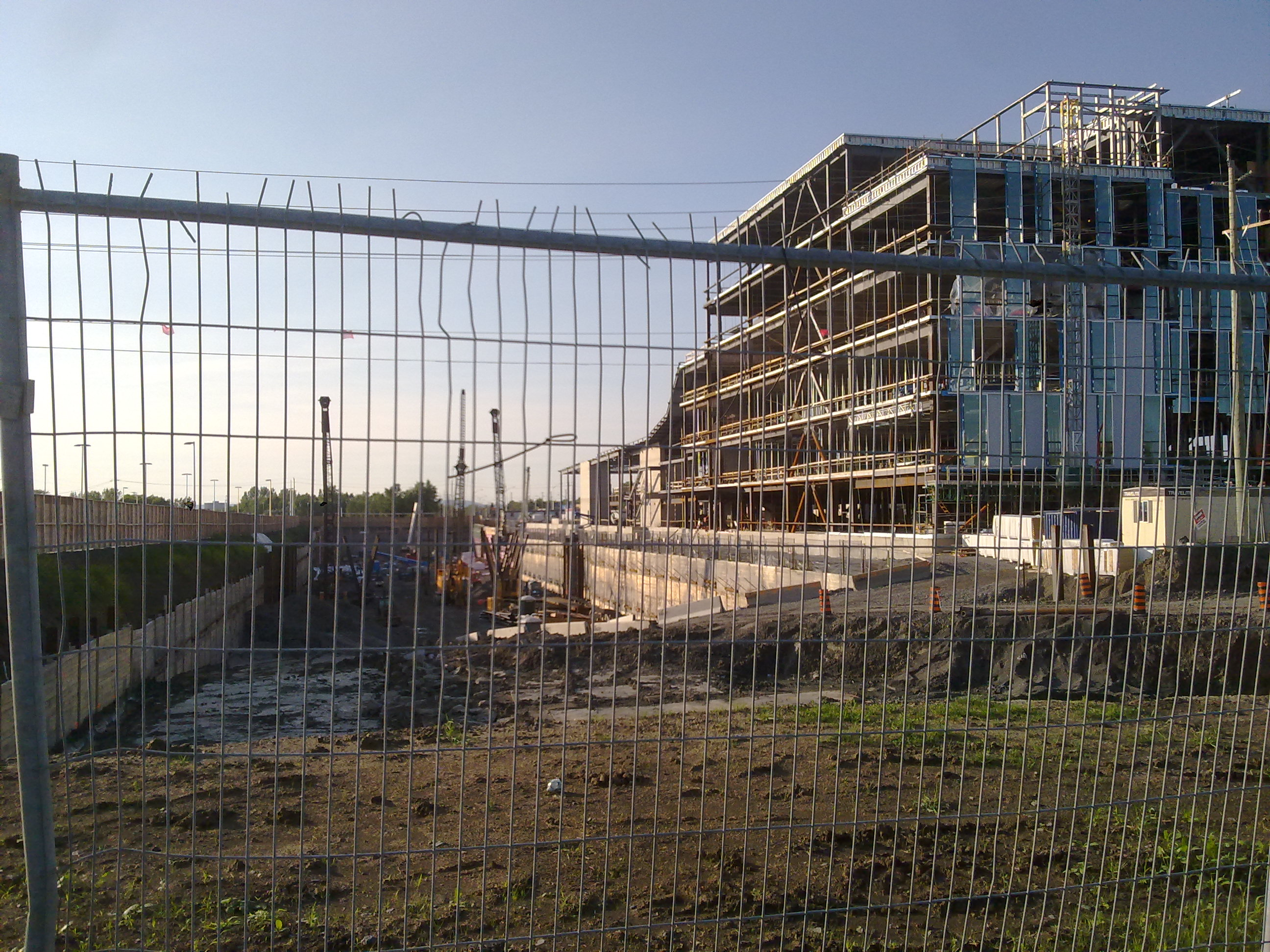
LRT construction to the left and ACCE under construction to the right (2010)

=== Phase 1B (April 2010 – November 2010) ===
- Construct an underpass beneath Tallwood Drive, west of Woodroffe Avenue (effectively scrapped, subject to the results of the Environmental Assessment Study for a Line 1 Extension to Barrhaven, due in mid- to late 2020)
- Construct the new Tallwood station at the site of the above mentioned underpass (effectively scrapped, subject to the results of the Environmental Assessment Study for a Line 1 Extension to Barrhaven, due in mid- to late 2020)
- Relocate the storm sewers and water mains along Tallwood Drive (effectively scrapped, subject to the results of the Environmental Assessment Study for a Line 1 Extension to Barrhaven, due in mid- to late 2020)

=== Phase 2 (2011–2013) ===
- Construct a new Baseline station at the College Avenue under pass south of ACCE (scrapped in favour of Stage 3 LRT expansion plans)
- Extend the grade separated southwest Transitway from Baseline Road south to Navaho Drive with a bus connection to Woodroffe Avenue at Navaho (completed)
- Extend the grade separated southwest Transitway from College Avenue to Norice Street, with ramps providing access to Tallwood station and a bus connection to Woodroffe Avenue at Norice (scrapped in favour of Stage 3 LRT expansion plans)

=== Light rail expansion and integration (2019–2027) ===
- Construct the southwest terminus of the Line 1 LRT at Baseline station, which includes the construction infrastructure needed for detouring existing bus traffic and station stops to permit construction, decommissioning the Transitway from approximately Navaho Drive to the underpass at Baseline Road and beyond, aligning the alignment into the tunnel beneath Baseline Station and converting it into exclusive LRT access including gravel, concrete pours, track work, signalling infrastructure, platform and building construction and the installation of the overhead catenary system.
- The new Baseline station is expected to see the entire current BRT station footprint be returned to landscaping and pedestrian/cycling infrastructure with a new BRT facility being constructed south of the ACCE and west of the existing park and ride, which will require slight reductions to the vehicular parking capacity on site. The new LRT station will be called Algonquin Station and will include a centre platform within the tunnel that is accessed via fare gate-secured connections with two surface buildings, one near Navaho Drive and one near College Avenue, the latter of which will directly connect to an upper floor of ACCE via an elevated pedestrian walkway. The rest of the station is expected to include retail space, public washrooms, bus operators' buildings, a bus layup area and a fare-paid transfer zone between busses and
- There are provisions allowing Baseline station to include storage tracks to accommodate train sets not in revenue service, allowing storage of trains during midday outside of peak for inclusion in the PM peak period or for event service.

== Service ==
The following routes currently serve Baseline station as of April 27, 2025:

Key
Line 1 (O-Train) Line 2 (O-Train) Line 4 (O-Train)	O-Train
E1	Shuttle Express
R1 R2 R4	O-Train replacement bus routes
N75	Night routes
40 12	Frequent routes
99 162	Local routes
275	Connexion routes
303	Shopper routes
405	Event routes
646	School routes
STO	Société de transport de l'Outaouais routes
Additional info: Line 1: Confederation Line; Line 2: Trillium Line; Line 4: Airport Link; Routes 5 to 199: Custom routing that that connects to Line 1 and/or 2; Routes 200 to 299: Connexion (peak-period only routes that connect to the O-Train); Routes 301 to 305: Shopper Routes (limited rural service); Routes 404 to 406: Canadian Tire Centre events; Routes 450 to 456: Lansdowne Park events; Routes 600 to 699: School Routes; Route R1: replaces Line 1 when it is out of service; Route R2: replaces Line 2 when it is out of service; Route R4: replaces Line 4 when it is out of service; Routes N39 to N98: night service (replaces Line 1 and N98 replaces Line 4); White backgrounds: limited service; Last two digits represent service area: 00s and 10s – Central; 20s – Gloucester; 30s – Orléans; 40s – Ottawa East; 50s – Ottawa West; 60s – Kanata, Stittsville; 70s – Barrhaven; 80s – Nepean; 90s – South Keys

Baseline station service
North O-Train	Under construction (opening in 2027)
Frequent routes	68 74 75 87 88 111
Local routes	53 73 82 84 112 116 117 187
Connexion routes	275 277 279
Shopper routes	305
Event routes	406 456
School routes	83 111 187 646 686 688

=== Notes ===
- Routes 73, 74, 75, 275, 277 and 279 will be shortened to start/end here in late 2026 when the O-Train Line 1 extension to Algonquin station is complete.
