= Highland Park, Ottawa =

Coordinates: 45°23′08″N 75°45′25″W

Highland Park is a sub-neighbourhood of Westboro, in the Kitchissippi Ward in Ottawa, Ontario, Canada. It is located between Carling Avenue and Richmond Road, Churchill Avenue and Denbury Ave. It is a mixed-income neighbourhood, with some large luxury homes closer to Richmond Road, middle-income homes built in the last two centuries, and a large number of lower-income low-rise apartment buildings closer to Carling Avenue. The population of the neighbourhood according to the Canada 2011 Census was 4,070.

Nepean High School and Notre Dame High School are prominent parts of the community, as is the Westboro Kiwanis Park, which has a tennis court, wading pool, and field which can be used for football or soccer. Dovercourt Recreation Center features meeting halls and a swimming pool.

The Highland Park area is part of the Ottawa Centre riding federally, which is currently held by Liberal MP Yasir Naqvi. Highland Park is also part of the Ottawa Centre riding provincially.
