= Byron Linear Tramway Park =

Park in Ottawa, Canada

Coordinates: 45°23′21″N 75°45′32″W

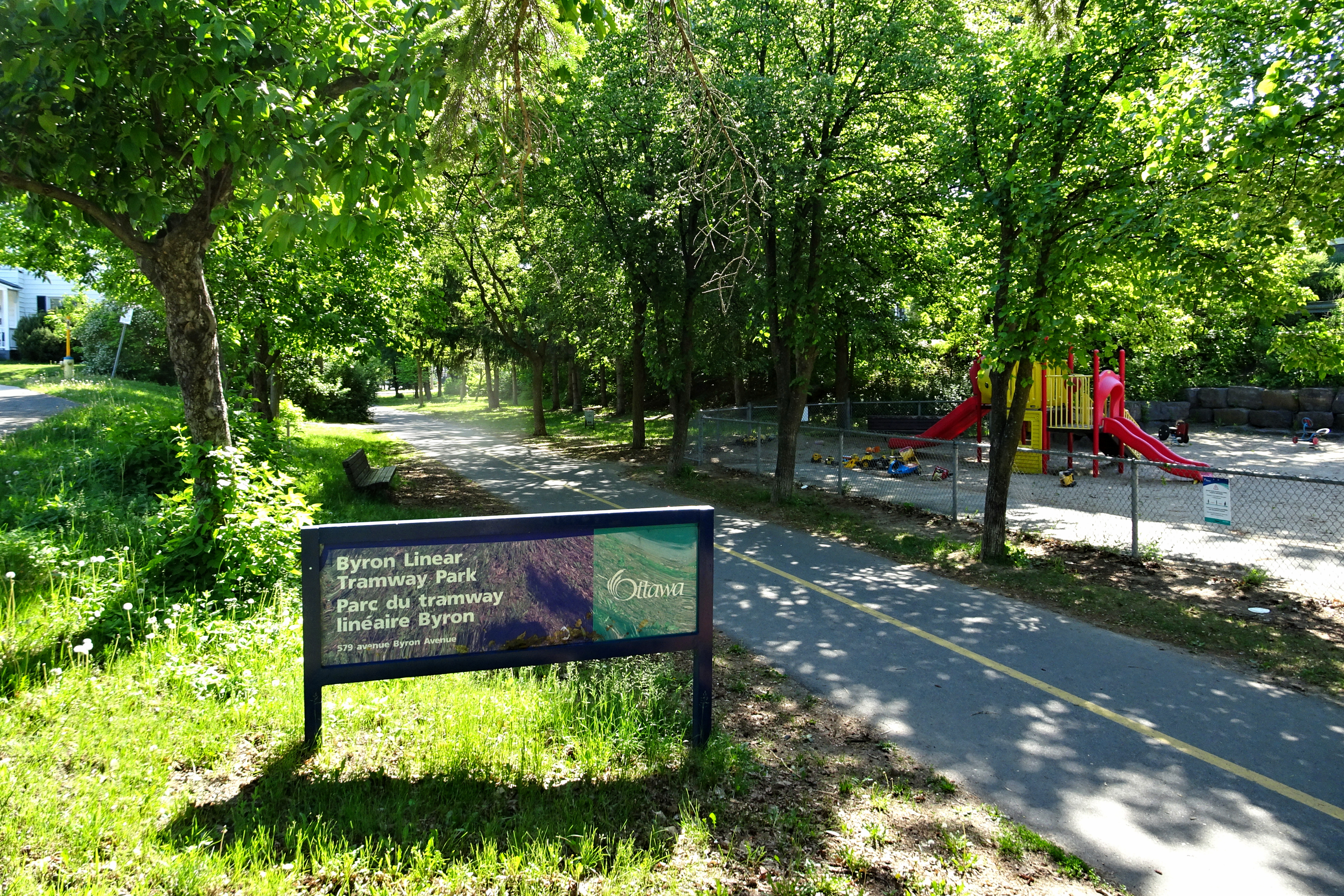
Byron Linear Tramway Park

Byron Linear Tramway Park is a municipal park in Kitchissippi Ward and Bay Ward in Ottawa, Ontario, Canada. The park forms a narrow strip of park land that runs westward from Holland Avenue to Richardson Avenue in Woodpark, with the exception of Westboro Village (between Churchill and Golden Avenues). Running through the entirety of the park is a path through grass and trees. The park forms a narrow 2.5 km strip, but has a width varies between 5 and 15 metres.

Much of the park was once a railway right-of-way for the Ottawa Electric Railway. The western section of the park forms the southern edge of Richmond Road and forms the complete area between Richmond road and Byron Avenue. Its path is winding and mostly tree lined. Seats and bus shelters exist in most city blocks. Parking is allowed along the section of Byron avenue from Golden west to Woodroffe Avenue, but not on other sections.

The eastern section forms the north side of Byron Avenue, but does not extend to Richmond Road. This section is also approximately 2.5 km long, but narrower in width.

A War Memorial, commemorating the dead of Westboro, is on the Strip, visible from Richmond road, near Golden. The park is colloquially known as the "Byron Strip".

The City of Ottawa is currently building a cut-and-cover subway tunnel along a 1.3 km stretch between Cleary and Richardson Avenues as part of the western extension of the O-Train Line 1. This stretch will include two open trench stations at Sherbourne and New Orchard.

== Places of interest adjacent to the strip ==
- Assumption of the Blessed Virgin Ukrainian Church
- Highland Park Lawn Bowling Green
- Community Of Christ Church
- Our Lady Of Fatima Church
- Fisher Park
- Westboro Superstore Shopping Centre
