= Iris station =

Bus station in Ottawa, Canada

Iris
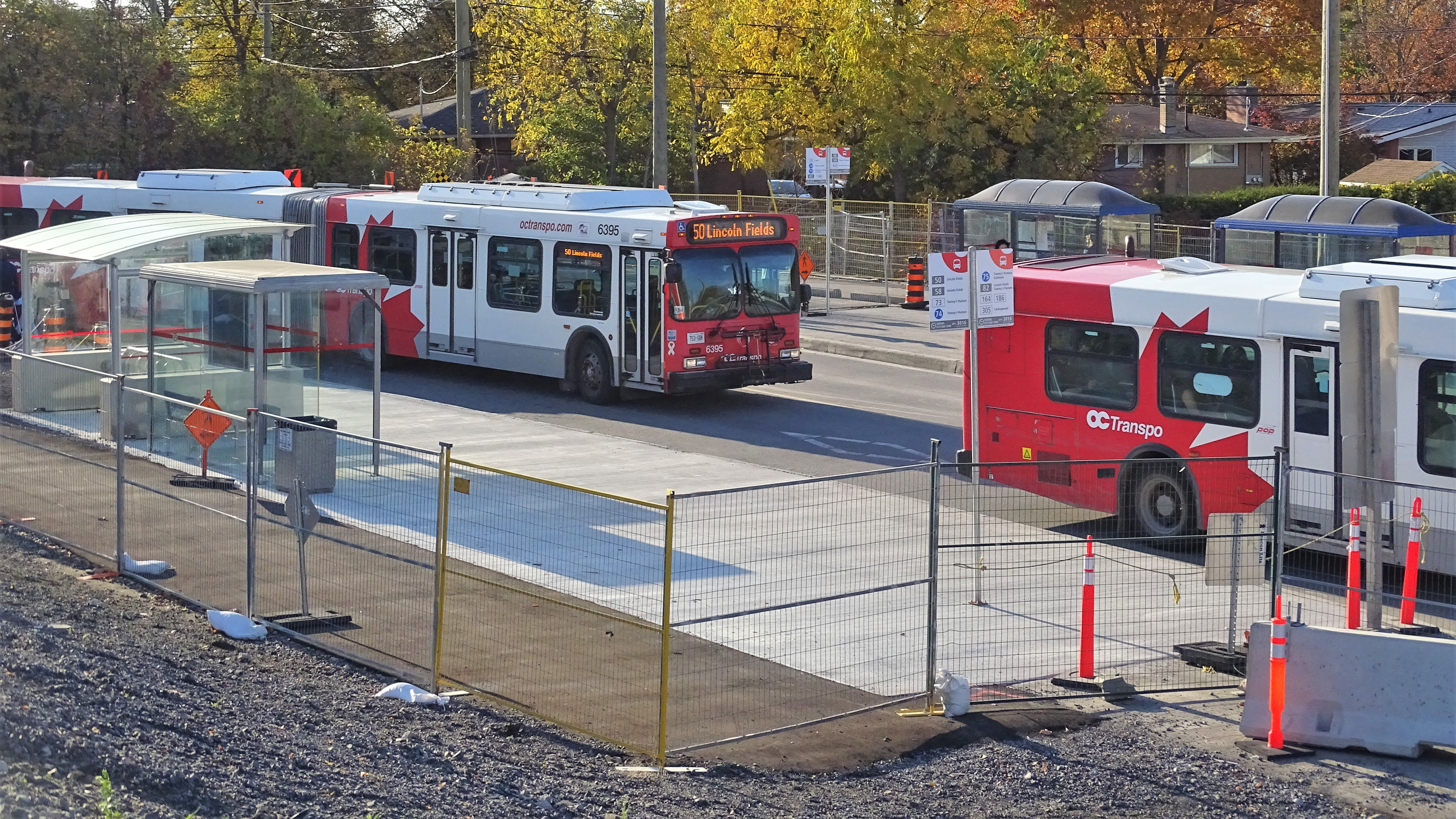
- Relocated bus station during Stage 2 construction.

General information
- Coordinates: 45°21′21″N 75°46′11″W
- Owner: OC Transpo
- Platforms: 2

Construction
- Structure type: At-grade
- Accessible: Yes

Other information
- Station code: 3016

History
- Opened: 1983

Services
Preceding station	OC Transpo	Following station
Baseline toward Limebank	Route 74	Queensway toward Tunney's Pasture
Baseline toward Cambrian	Route 75	Queensway toward Tunney's Pasture

Future services
Preceding station	OC Transpo	Following station
Algonquin Terminus	Line 1 Opens 2027	Lincoln Fields toward Trim
Location

Iris station is one of the few grade-level stations on the Southwest Transitway. It is located on Iris Street, a collector road in western Ottawa.

It is both one of the smallest Transitway stations and one of the least used, likely because it is only 400 m (1/4 mi) south of Queensway station, has no trip generators apart from residential commuters in the area, and does not have any major routes connecting at the station.

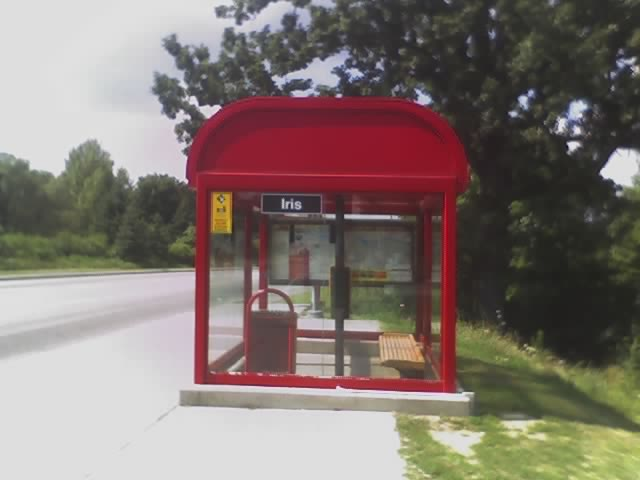
Original bus shelter in 2007 prior to Stage 2 construction.

Iris station is being converted to a light rail station as a part of Stage 2 of O-Train Line 1. As a result of this, numerous significant changes and realignments are being made in the vicinity, including the installation of a new bridge on Iris Street and the relocation of the Pinecrest Creek. In June 2022, the segment of Transitway between Iris station and Baseline station closed permanently, with buses currently detoured along Woodroffe Avenue and re-entering the Transitway at this station.

== Service ==
The following routes serve Iris station as of April 27, 2025:

Type	Routes
North O-Train	Under construction (opening in 2027)
South O-Train	Under construction (opening in 2027)
Frequent routes	74 75
Local routes	73 81
Connexion routes	256 261 262 263 265 266 275 277 279
Shopper's Routes	305

=== Notes ===
- Event route 406 does not service this station directly but services a nearby stop at Woodroffe and Iris.
