= Lincoln Heights, Ottawa =

Lincoln Heights
- Neighbourhood
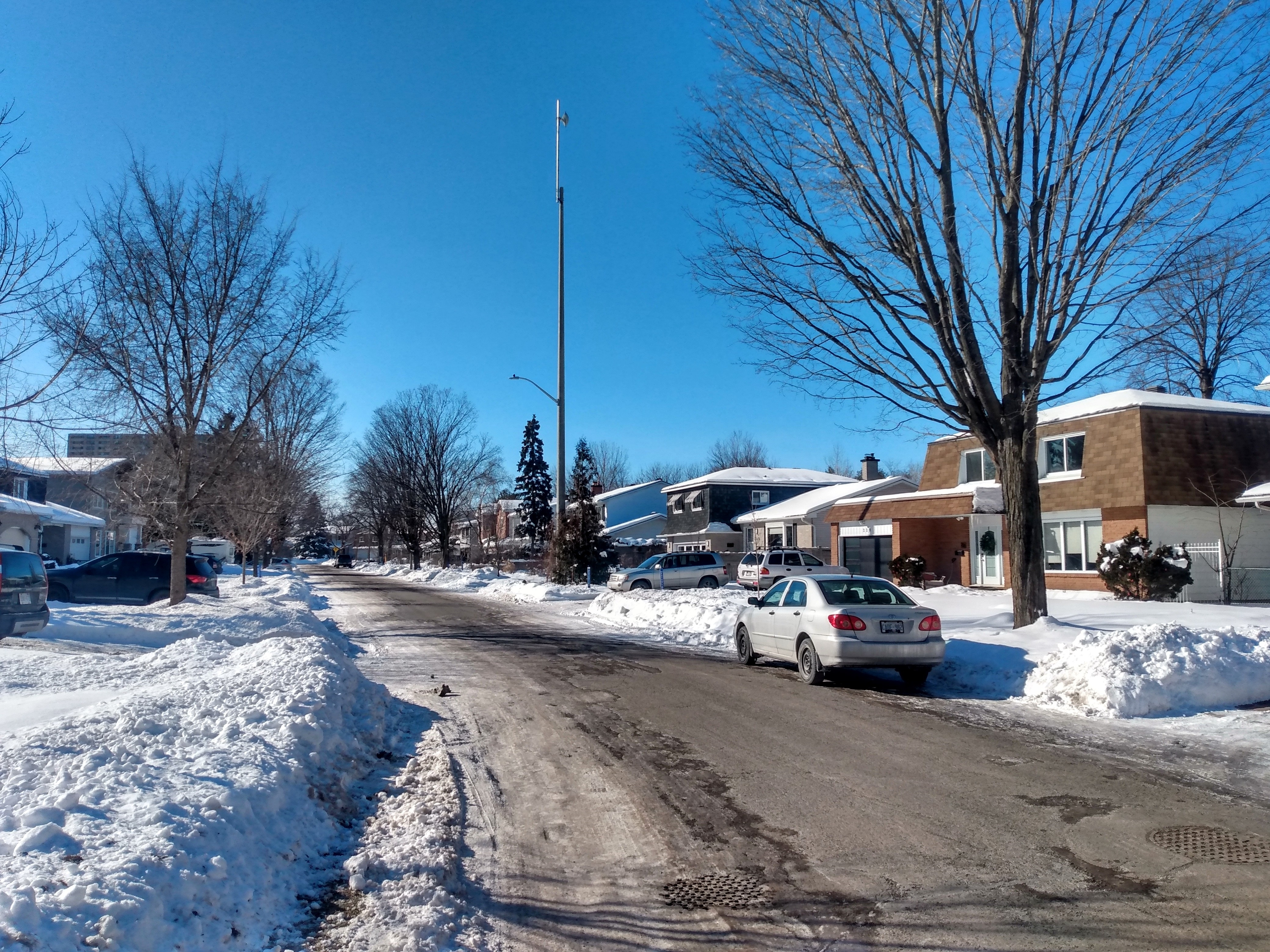
- Lincoln Heights Road

- Location in Ottawa
- Coordinates: 45°22′05″N 75°47′15″W
- Country: Canada
- Province: Ontario
- City: Ottawa

Government
  - MPs: Anita Vandenbeld
  - MPPs: Chandra Pasma
  - Councillors: Theresa Kavanagh
  - Governing body: Lincoln-Heights Parkway Community Association (sic)
  - President: Tyler Proulx

Area
  - Total: 0.634 km^{2} (0.245 sq mi)
- Elevation: 60 m (200 ft)

Population (2016)
  - Total: 1,630
  - Density: 2,570/km^{2} (6,660/sq mi)
- Canada 2016 Census
- Time zone: UTC−5 (Eastern (EST))
  - Summer (DST): UTC−4 (EDT)
- Forward sortation area: K2B
- Website: Community Association

Lincoln Heights (also known as Lincoln Heights - Parkway or Lincoln Fields) is a neighbourhood in the Britannia area of Bay Ward in the west end of Ottawa, Ontario, Canada. It is defined by its community association as being bounded to the south by the north side of Regina Lane (now Starflower Lane), to the north by the Ottawa River, to the west by the east side of Croydon Avenue, and to the east by the Kichi Zibi Mikan (formerly the Sir John A. Macdonald Parkway / Ottawa River Parkway). According to the Canada 2016 Census, the population of the neighbourhood is 1,630. The greater Lincoln Heights area can be defined as extending as far west as Greenview Avenue and as far south as Carling Avenue, which overlaps with neighbouring Britannia Village.

The area is notable for its proximity to the Ottawa River and Mud Lake bird sanctuary. Lincoln Fields transit station is the main transit hub in the neighbourhood, and Lincoln Fields Shopping Centre was the main commercial centre before closing in 2019.

Construction plans for the neighbourhood were announced in 1958 by Assaly Construction Limited, with plans for a $20,000,000 "luxury sub-division" on the site of the Magee farm. The neighbourhood began to be built c. 1960 on Regina Street. Following the removal of the Canadian Pacific Railway line (where today's Plover Lane is), the neighbourhood expanded further north in the early 1970s with the construction of Lincoln Heights Road.

There are many high-rise condominiums and apartments in the neighbourhood.

The Old Forge Community Resource Centre, which is located in a historic building, is a key community centre. Carlingwood Shopping Centre is just east of Lincoln Fields at the corner of Carling and Woodroffe Avenue.

== See also ==
- List of Ottawa neighbourhoods
