= Carlingwood =

- Neighbourhood
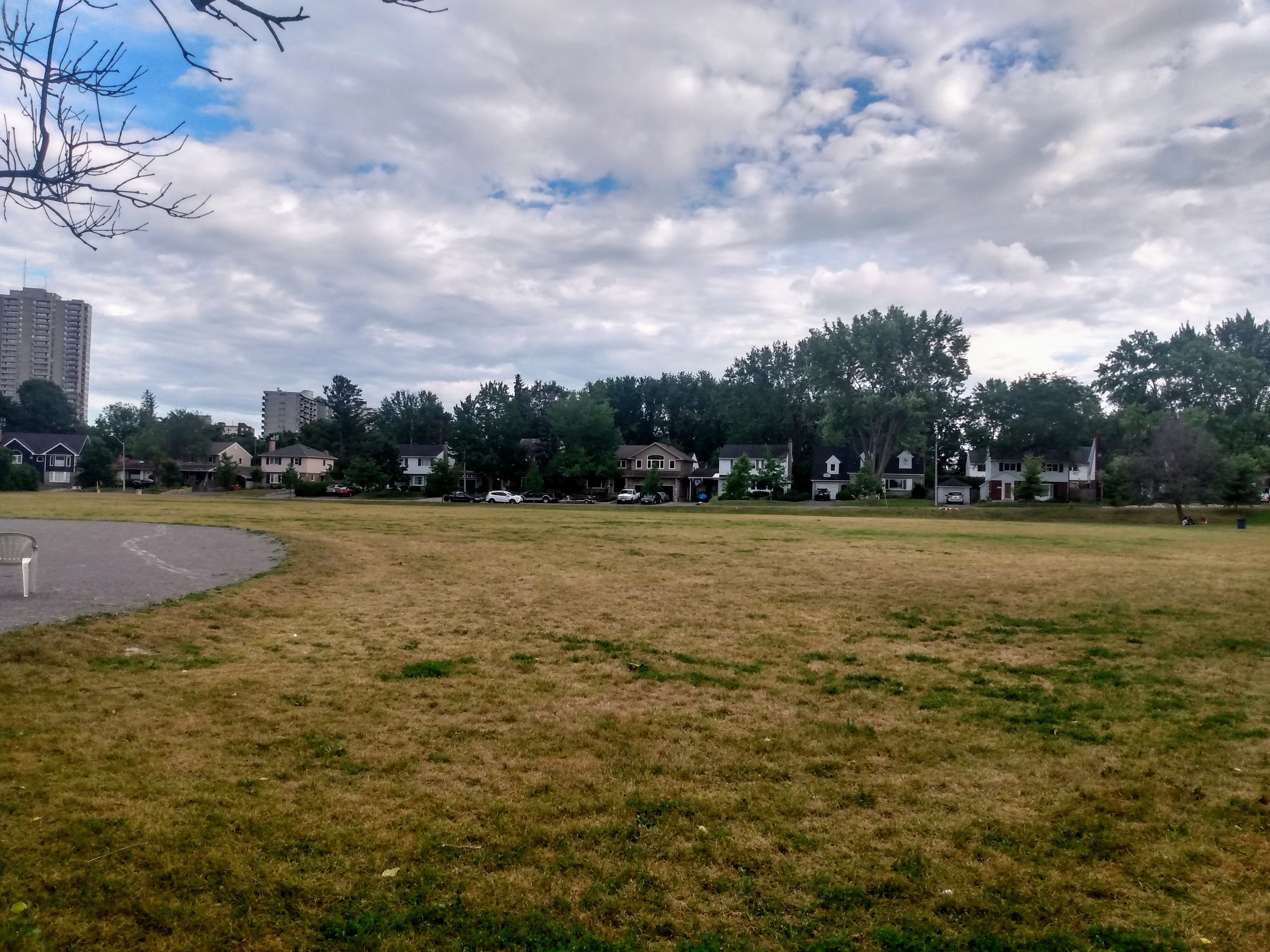
- Westwood Park

- Location within Ottawa
- Coordinates: 45.37617°N 75.76907°W
- Country: Canada
- Province: Ontario
- City: Ottawa

Government
  - MPs: Anita Vandenbeld
  - MPPs: Chandra Pasma
  - Councillors: Theresa Kavanagh
  - Governing body: Carlingwood Community Association

Area
  - Total: 0.779 km^{2} (0.301 sq mi)
- Elevation: 70 m (230 ft)

Population (Canada 2016 Census)
  - Total: 3,558
  - Density: 4,570/km^{2} (11,800/sq mi)
- Time zone: Eastern (EST)
- Forward sortation area: K2A
- Website: Carlingwood Community Association

Carlingwood is a neighbourhood in Bay Ward in the west end of Ottawa, Ontario, Canada. The neighbourhood is roughly bounded on the north by Richmond Road, on the east by Sherbourne Road, on the south by Carling Avenue and on the west by Woodroffe Avenue. This area corresponds to census tract 5050032.01, which had a population of 3,558 according to the Canada 2016 Census.

The Carlingwood Shopping Centre was built in 1956 at the corner of Carling and Woodroffe. The surrounding neighbourhood would be built later in the decade. Somserset Towers and the Saville Apartments (then known as Saville Terrace) were built in the early 1963, and Bromley Square was built in 1972.

Carlingwood is home to two parks, Westwood and Woodroffe, the latter of which has a play structure, wading pool, and temporary hockey rink (in winter). Byron Linear Tramway Park is located nearby. It is also home of Woodroffe Avenue Public School, Our Lady of Fatima School and the Ottawa Public Library Carlingwood Branch. Churches in Carlingwood include Our Lady of Fatima Catholic, Ukrainian Orthodox Cathedral Assumption Of The Blessed Virgin, Woodroffe United, St. Martin's Anglican, and Bromley Road Baptist. During the summer, Shouldice Berry Farms operates a stand at the corner of Byron and Woodroffe.

Carlingwood is also the home to the soon-to-come Sherbourne station in the O-Train Line 1 West Extension, to come in 2027. OC Transpo routes 51, 11, 85, and 87 pass through it or on a nearby major road.
