= Queensway station (Ottawa) =

Queensway
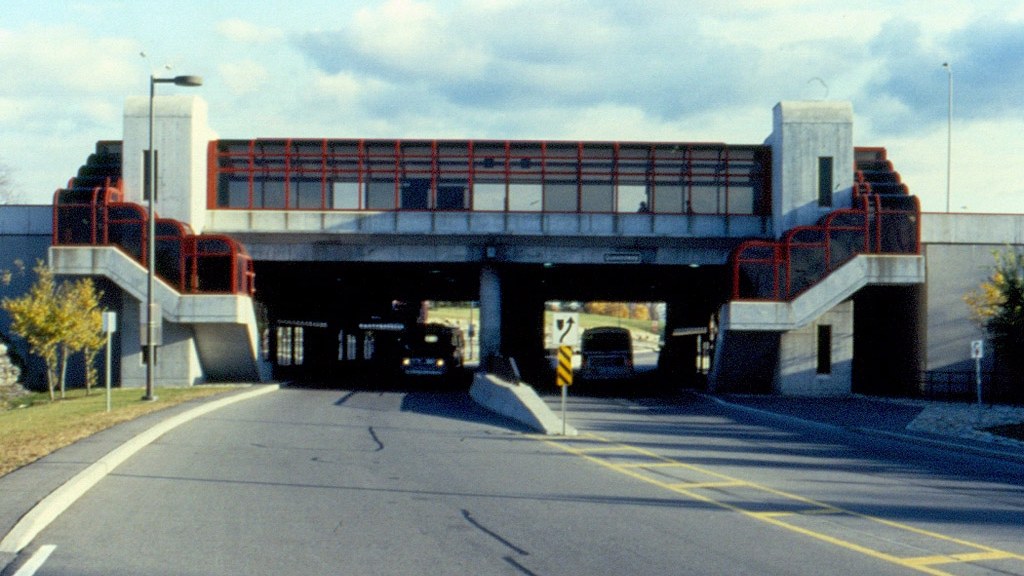

General information
- Coordinates: 45°21′33″N 75°46′19″W
- Owner: OC Transpo

Construction
- Structure type: At-grade, below grade
- Platform levels: 2
- Accessible: Yes

Other information
- Station code: 3015

History
- Opened: December 11, 1983
- Rebuilt: Partially demolished February 2023

Services
Preceding station	OC Transpo	Following station
Iris toward Limebank	Route 74	Lincoln Fields toward Tunney's Pasture
Iris toward Cambrian	Route 75	Lincoln Fields toward Tunney's Pasture
Location

Queensway station is a bus rapid transit station along the Southwest Transitway, located immediately west of Woodroffe Avenue, where the Transitway passes under the Queensway in Ottawa, Canada.

The station is connected to nearby residential areas with multi use pathways to the north, west, and south of the station.

As of 2025, the station has been partially demolished for O-Train Stage 2 West construction . The shelter structures on the westbound and eastbound platforms at the highway levels (stops 3A and 4A) were demolished and replaced with bus shelters, and the northbound Transitway platform previously beneath the Queensway (stop 2A), as well as the connecting stairwells and elevators were demolished. Stop 2A has been moved 80 meters north.

After the completion of Stage 2, the station is to be decommissioned and the area is to be reinstated to match its surrounding area. The existing multi use pathway from Roman Avenue will connect to the existing Pinecrest Creek Pathway by way of the current Transitway ramp to the Queensway. While the eastbound platform and its access to the lower level will be preserved for emergency access to the Queensway, the remaining station structure, stairwells, as well as existing ramps used to access the Transitway from the 417 and the Transitway itself will be demolished, making this one of the few former Transitway stations to be taken out of service, rather than converted to light rail.

== Service ==
The following routes serve Queensway station as of August 24, 2025:

Services (#3015)
Stop	Routes
1A Transitway South	73 74 75 305
2A Transitway North	73 74 75 256 261 262 263 265 266 301 303 305
2A Off only	275 277 279
3A Highway 417 West	406
4A Highway 417 East	60 61 62 63 66 67 256 261 262 263 265 266 301 303 454

Key
Line 1 (O-Train) Line 2 (O-Train) Line 4 (O-Train)	O-Train
E1	Shuttle Express
R1 R2 R4	O-Train replacement bus routes
N75	Night routes
40 12	Frequent routes
99 162	Local routes
275	Connexion routes
303	Shopper routes
405	Event routes
646	School routes
STO	Société de transport de l'Outaouais routes
Additional info: Line 1: Confederation Line; Line 2: Trillium Line; Line 4: Airport Link; Routes 5 to 199: Custom routing that that connects to Line 1 and/or 2; Routes 200 to 299: Connexion (peak-period only routes that connect to the O-Train); Routes 301 to 305: Shopper Routes (limited rural service); Routes 404 to 406: Canadian Tire Centre events; Routes 450 to 456: Lansdowne Park events; Routes 600 to 699: School Routes; Route R1: replaces Line 1 when it is out of service; Route R2: replaces Line 2 when it is out of service; Route R4: replaces Line 4 when it is out of service; Routes N39 to N98: night service (replaces Line 1 and N98 replaces Line 4); White backgrounds: limited service; Last two digits represent service area: 00s and 10s – Central; 20s – Gloucester; 30s – Orléans; 40s – Ottawa East; 50s – Ottawa West; 60s – Kanata, Stittsville; 70s – Barrhaven; 80s – Nepean; 90s – South Keys

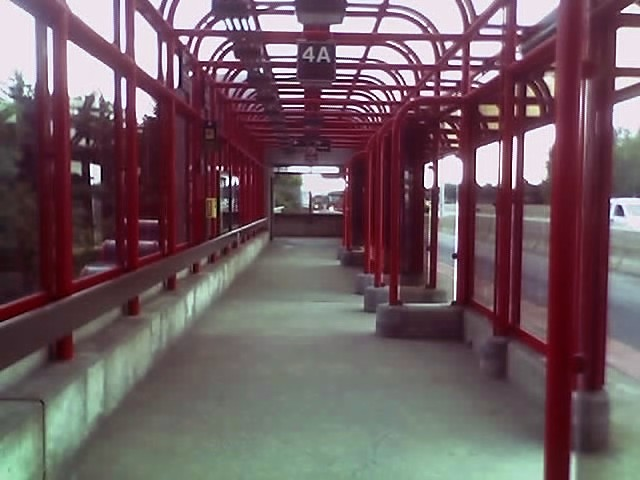
Platform 4A, serving eastbound Queensway/417
