= Lincoln Fields Shopping Centre =

Former shopping centre in Ottawa, Ontario, Canada

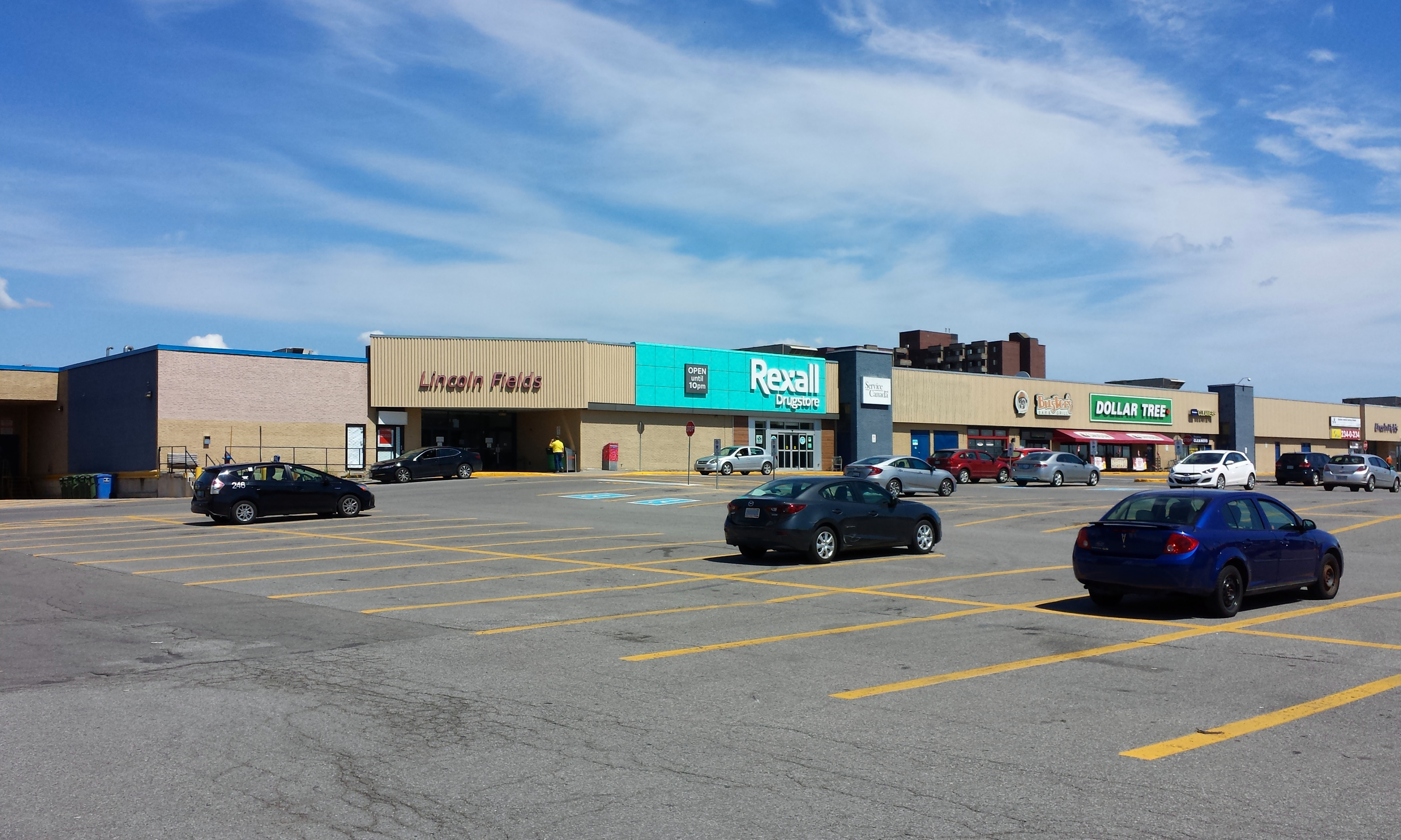
- Lincoln Fields Shopping Centre in July 2018
- Location: Ottawa, Ontario, Canada
- Coordinates: 45°21′54″N 75°47′11″W
- Address: 2525 Carling Avenue
- Opened: May 24, 1972
- Closed: July 31, 2019
- Num. of stores: 30+
- Floors: 2
- Parking: 1000+ spaces

Lincoln Fields Shopping Centre (previously Lincoln Heights Galleria) was a community mall located in the Lincoln Heights neighbourhood of Ottawa, Ontario, Canada. It was located between Carling Avenue and Richmond Road just west of Lincoln Fields station. In October 2019, the mall was closed due to changing demographics in the area and departure of the Walmart store.

Lincoln Fields Shopping Centre was developed out of a project named "Cinema City", proposed in 1964. The proposed CA$25 million complex would feature over 80 stores across three floors, a three-screen movie theatre and four luxury apartment buildings with a planned opening date of March 1967. However, the following years saw no development. The project was repeatedly scaled down and expected construction costs rose to $85 million. The site's original developers eventually sold the land to a new team who instead proposed a $3.8 million single-story shopping mall. The mall broke ground on June 9, 1971 and opened on May 24, 1972, becoming the city's third enclosed shopping centre. In 1985, the mall underwent renovations and was rebranded as Lincoln Heights Galleria, though residents continued referring to the mall as "Lincoln Fields".

In 2016, the Walmart store closed and relocated to Bayshore Shopping Centre. This caused the mall to lose a significant portion of its clientele. In November 2018, the Wendy's restaurant, housed in a separate building fronting Carling Avenue, burned down in a fire that police said was deliberately set.

In January 2019, it was announced the mall's leases would terminate on July 31 of that year. The mall's eastern half was demolished in summer 2020. This left the Rexall and Metro stores in operation until they moved into two newly built spaces the following year. The mall's western half was demolished in 2021. Long-term development plans by RioCan include high-density residential towers on the site.
