= Carlingwood Mall =

Carlingwood Shopping Centre
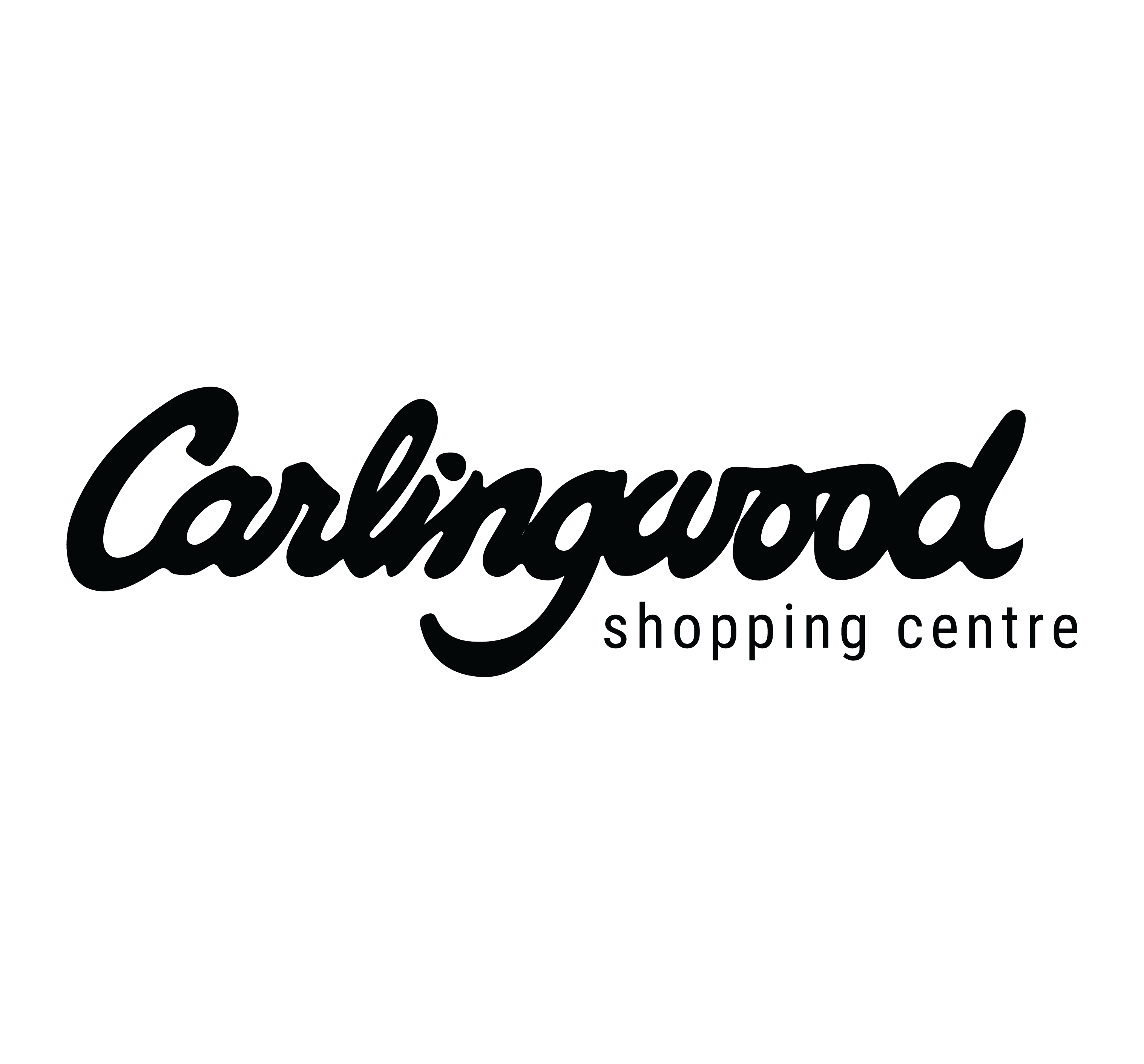

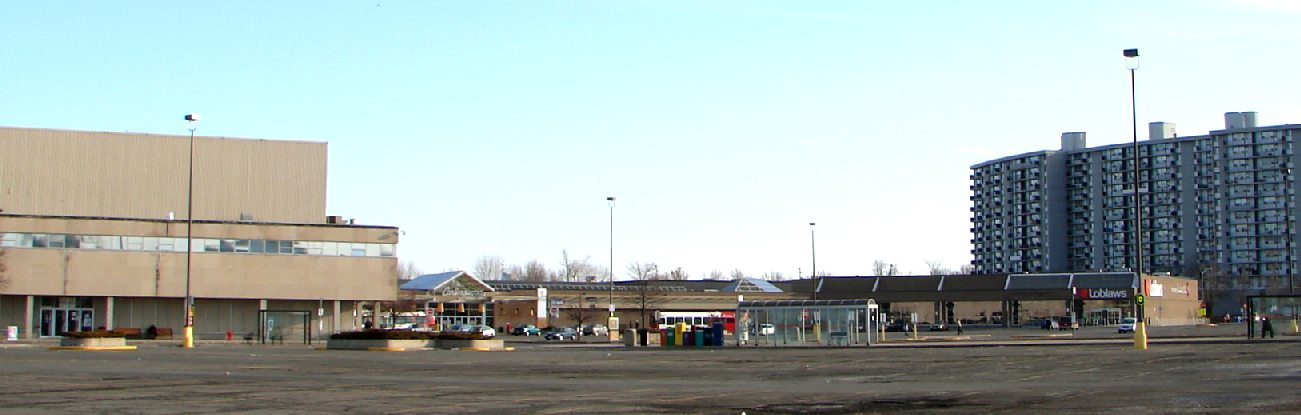
- Carlingwood Shopping Centre in 2010
- Location: Ottawa, Ontario, Canada
- Coordinates: 45.372°N 75.77°W
- Address: 2121 Carling Avenue
- Opened: 1956
- Owner: Anthem Properties Group
- Num. of stores: 100
- Num. of anchor tenants: 2
- Floor area: 525,934 sq ft or 48,860.9 m^{2}
- Floors: 2
- Parking: Over 2,500 parking spaces
- Website: www.carlingwood.com

Carlingwood Shopping Centre is a shopping mall located in the Carlingwood neighbourhood of Ottawa, Ontario, Canada. The mall opened in 1956 and was one of the city's first major shopping centres. Since May 2024, it has been operated by Anthem Properties Group.

== Description ==
Carlingwood Shopping Centre contains 100 stores and services on a single enclosed level. The interior hallways are laid out in a rectangle, with secondary branching halls from six entrances. Offices and services, including the management office, are located on a trim second level in the northwest corner of the building. There are also two small underground sections housing some discount stores and a gym (at one point a YMCA/YWCA). The mall houses a mix of chain and independent services including retail (Ardene, Dollarama, Rexall) food service (A&W, Subway, Tim Hortons) and banking (CIBC, RBC, Scotiabank) with Loblaws and Canadian Tire serving as the mall's anchor tenants.

The mall is situated at the corner of Carling and Woodroffe Avenues, about 1 km north of the Highway 417. A 1996 survey found that 21% of shoppers used mass transit to travel to and from the mall despite being designed as an automobile destination. The mall is served by OC Transpo routes 51, 85, 87, 153, 301, 303, 305.

== History ==
In 1955, the Simpsons-Sears department store opened on the grounds of the present-day mall. It had two floors with 160,400 square feet (14,900 m^{2}) retail space. The rest of the mall was constructed around Simpson-Sears over the next year, opening in 1956 as an L-shaped strip mall. At the time, it was the largest shopping centre in Ottawa, with over 40 stores. One of the selling points of the mall was its extensive 24 acres (97,000 m^{2}) of parking space. The mall was enclosed in 1971, and a third storey was added to Sears at the end of the decade. In 1957, the Carlingwood Branch of the Ottawa Public Library opened in the mall, the first mall library in Canada. The branch later moved to a nearby custom-built facility in 1966.

Carlingwood Shopping Centre was formerly the home of one of the oldest and smallest Zellers stores in Ottawa until the location closed in 1999. That same year, the mall's Marks & Spencer store closed as well.

In 2002, the management of the mall was criticized by the Canadian Union of Public Employees for locking out cleaning staff who were part of the union in favour of a non-union team who received minimum wage and no benefits. The CUPE boycott of the mall ended with a victory for the union. Bill Murnighan, a writer for Our Times, used the dispute as an example of the "crossroads" that union organizing faced in Canada at the beginning of the millennium. Although the strike was directed at the shopping centre in the interest of gaining more publicity and having more impact, the cleaning staff were not employees of the shopping centre.

Carlingwood Shopping Centre was renovated the mid-2000s to add seating and other "comfort" improvements. In an interview with Ottawa Business Journal, then-general manager Denis Pelletier named the renovation as one of the reasons for the mall's successful 2005 Christmas shopping season, along with the mall's bargain store, Sears, and easy customer access. There are upholstered benches in the four main passages capable of seating over 180 people. In addition, there are over 150 tables in the three refreshment areas, each with two or more seats. Both sitting and refreshment areas are decorated with planters containing trees or shrubs.

Until July 2005, the Alex Dayton Seniors Activity Centre, co-founded by Ottawa Mayor Bob Chiarelli, was located near entrance three on the mall's east side. For the 2007 Ontario election, the space was used as the office for provincial politician Jim Watson's re-election campaign.

On January 8, 2018, the Sears store closed after the company went bankrupt. This left Loblaws as the mall's only anchor tenant. Demolition of the former store took place from March to June 2019 and was ultimately replaced with a new Canadian Tire flagship store—which opened on September 22, 2022 as the chain's largest Canadian store to-date.
