= Carling Avenue =

Major arterial road in Ottawa, Ontario, Canada

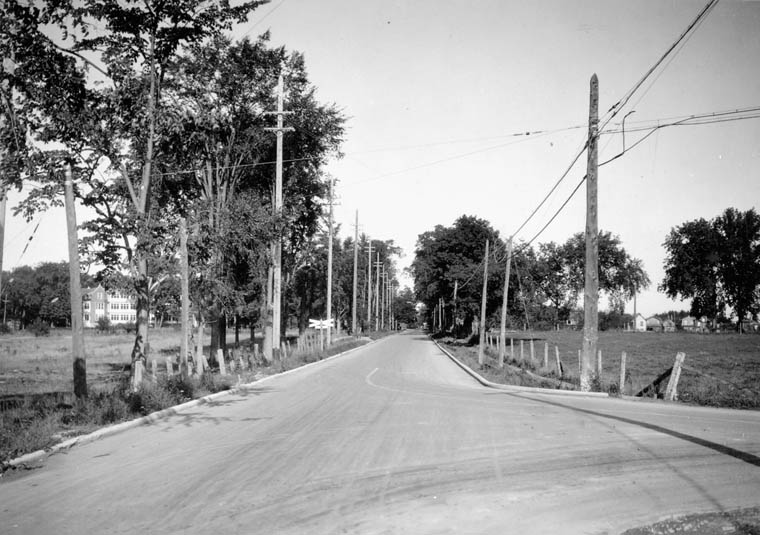
The intersection of Carling Avenue and Merivale Road in the 1920s.

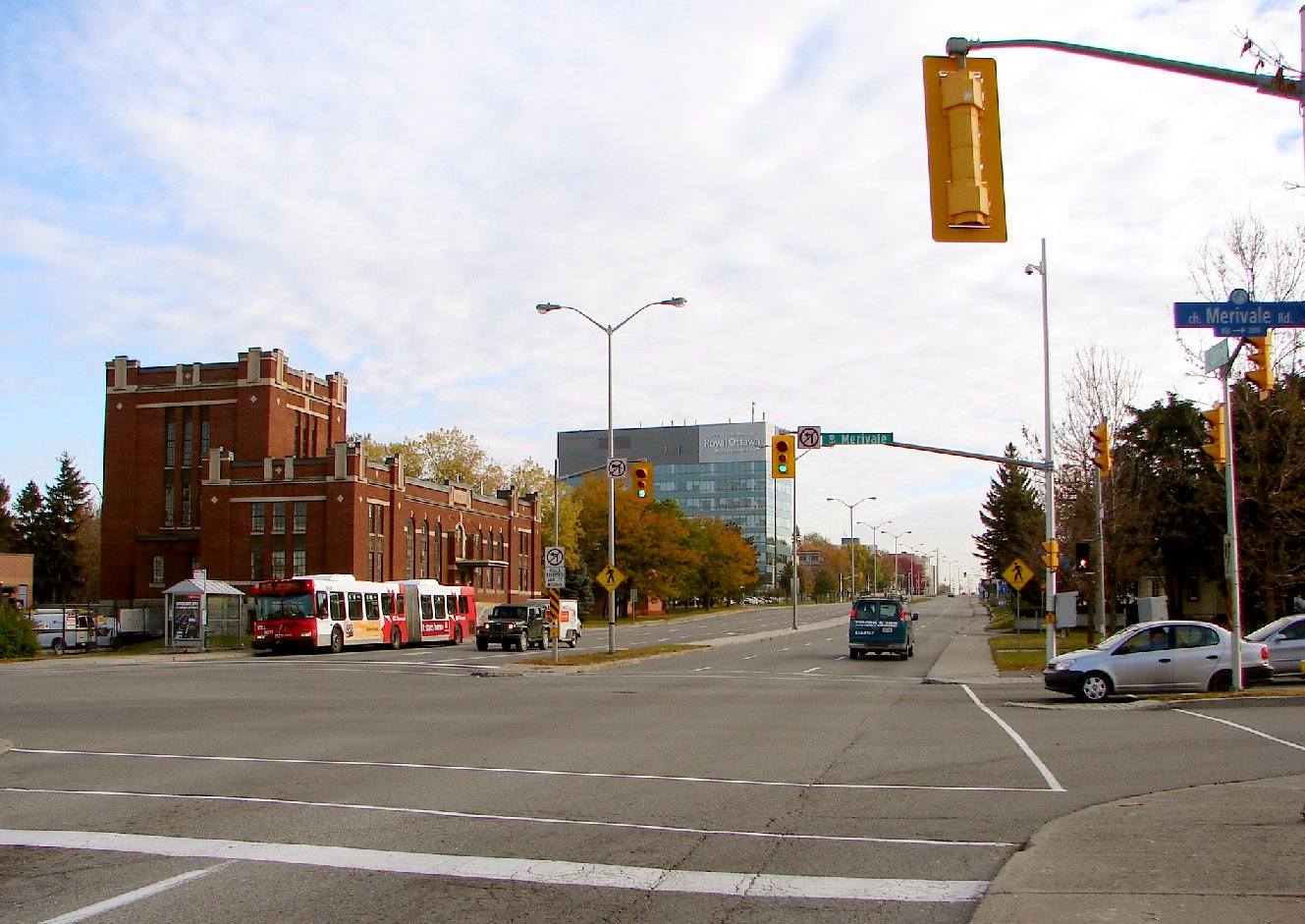
The same intersection in 2009.

Carling Avenue is a major east–west arterial road in the west end of Ottawa, Ontario, Canada. It runs from March Road in Kanata to Bronson Avenue in the Glebe. The road is named for John Carling, founder of Carling Brewery and Conservative MP and Senator, Postmaster General and Minister of Agriculture.

== Road description ==
At approximately 19 km (12 mi) in length, Carling Avenue begins at the fringes of the Glebe neighbourhood and runs in a straight direction west until the Ottawa River where it bends north to go around Crystal Bay and Britannia Bay and ends north of Kanata. It used to begin at O'Connor Street, one block east of Bank Street, but the part east of Bronson was renamed Glebe Avenue on February 7, 1974. It is a four to six-lane principal arterial road for most of its urban length, with a speed limit of 60 km/h (37 mph). The portion through the Greenbelt and into Kanata is generally a two-lane rural highway (although widening is planned, which would also remove a substandard underpass in the 3700 block about midway between March Road and Moodie Drive), with a speed limit of 80 km/h (50 mph).

In December 2005 one lane in each direction between Booth Street and Cambridge South just before Bronson was converted to a bus-only lane. This very short (roughly 150 m) bus-only section speeds up bus traffic through the Carling/Bronson intersection during rush-hour.

Carling Avenue is roughly 19 km long.

== Features ==
Notable features located along Carling Avenue from west to east are Mitel, the Carling Campus, the Communications Research Centre, Smithvale Stables, Andrew Haydon Park, the Lincoln Fields Shopping Centre, Carlingwood Mall, Fairlawn Plaza, Westgate Mall, the Royal Ottawa Mental Health Centre, Ottawa Civic Hospital, Old Dominion Observatory, and Claridge Icon condo tower. It also runs along the northern boundaries of the Central Experimental Farm and Commissioners Park.

== Others ==
Carling is now internally designated (unsigned) as Ottawa Road #38 but was formerly Highway 17B east of Richmond Road until the Ontario government downloaded the highway to the local government. Until the 1970s, the western part of Carling was also part of Highway 17.

From 2004 to 2007, Carling Avenue was named one of Ontario's worst 20 roads in a CAA survey, citing frequent bumps and potholes.

One of the first UFO monitoring stations used for Project Magnet was located on Carling Avenue.

== OC Transpo service ==
Dow's Lake station on O-Train Line 2, is located near the intersection of Carling Avenue and Preston Street. OC Transpo bus routes also serve the station.

== Major intersections ==
The addresses change erratically on Carling; they are not consistent from point to point and rise rapidly in the eastern part, then slow down to a very slow rise west of Bayshore.

Major intersections (from west to east, approximate address point):

- March Road (4100)
- Moodie Drive (3500)
- Holly Acres Road, an approach to Highway 417 (3200)
- Bayshore Drive (3100)
- Pinecrest Road (2800)
- Richmond Road (2700)
- Kichi Zibi Mikan (2500)
- Woodroffe Avenue (2200)
- Maitland Avenue (1800)
- Queensway/Kirkwood Avenue (1500)
- Merivale Road (1300)
- Fisher Avenue/Holland Avenue/Island Park Drive/NCC Scenic Driveway (1100)
- Parkdale Avenue (1000)
- Preston Street (800)
- Booth Street (600)
- Bronson Avenue (300)

== Neighbourhoods ==
Neighbourhoods along its length are:

- Crystal Beach
- Bayshore
- Michelle Heights
- Britannia
- Pinewood
- Lincoln Heights
- Carlingwood
- Whitehaven
- Carlington
- Hampton Park
- Civic Hospital
- Glebe
- Queensway Terrace North
