= Demographics of Ottawa =

- Population pyramid of Ottawa in 2021
- Population: 1,017,449 (2021)

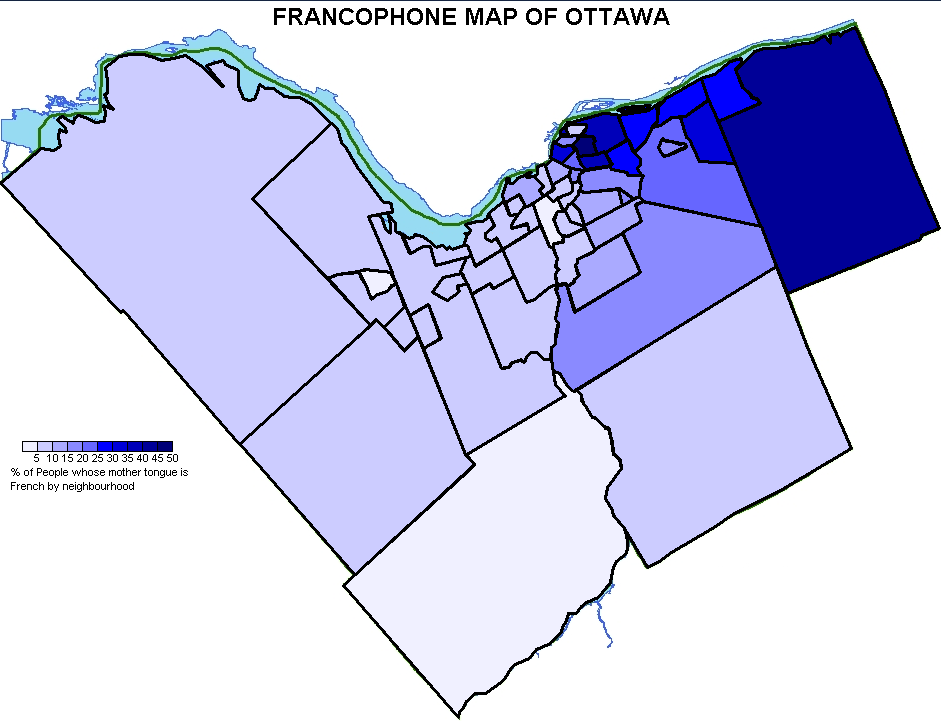
Map of Ottawa showing the francophone concentrations

In 2021, the population of the city of Ottawa was 1,017,449. The population of the census metropolitan area, Ottawa-Gatineau, was 1,488,307.

== Population history ==
Current boundaries
Year	Pop.	±%
1901	101,102	—
1911	123,417	+22.1%
1921	152,868	+23.9%
1931	174,056	+13.9%
1941	206,367	+18.6%
1951	246,298	+19.3%
1956	287,244	+16.6%
1961	358,410	+24.8%
1966	413,695	+15.4%
1971	471,931	+14.1%
1976	520,533	+10.3%
1981	546,849	+5.1%
1986	606,639	+10.9%
1991	678,147	+11.8%
1996	721,136	+6.3%
2001 (Note: In early 2001, the Province of Ontario dissolved the former City of Ottawa by amalgamating it with eleven other municipalities to form a new City of Ottawa. The 1996 adjusted population of the amalgamated city published in the 2001 census was 721,136, while the population of the dissolved former City of Ottawa in 2001 was 337,031.)	774,072	+7.3%
2006	812,129	+4.9%
2011	883,391	+8.8%
2016	934,243	+5.8%
2021	1,017,449	+8.9%

Former boundaries
Year	Pop.	±%
1871	21,545	—
1881	27,412	+27.2%
1891	44,154	+61.1%
1901	59,928	+35.7%
1911	87,062	+45.3%
1921	107,843	+23.9%
1931	126,872	+17.6%
1941	154,951	+22.1%
1951	202,045	+30.4%
1956	222,129	+9.9%
1961	268,206	+20.7%
1966	290,741	+8.4%
1971	302,341	+4.0%
1976	304,462	+0.7%
1981	295,163	−3.1%
1986	300,763	+1.9%
1991	313,987	+4.4%
1996	323,340	+3.0%
2001	337,031	+4.2%
2006	329,180	−2.3%
2011	337,761	+2.6%
2016	341,998	+1.3%
2021	360,211	+5.3%

Census metropolitan area
Year	Pop.	±%
1991	941,814	—
1996	1,010,498	+7.3%
2001	1,067,800	+5.7%
2006	1,133,633	+6.2%
2011	1,236,324	+9.1%
2016	1,371,576	+10.9%
2021	1,488,307	+8.5%

== Age and sex ==
In 2001, females made up 51.2% of the amalgamated Ottawa population, while the median age of the population was 36.7 years of age. Youths under 15 years of age comprised 18.9% of the total population, while those of retirement age (65 years and older) comprised 11.4%.

== Migration and immigration ==
Between 1987 and 2002, 131,816 individuals relocated to the city, which represents 75% of the population growth for that period. Foreign immigration plays a significant role in Ottawa's population growth. Foreign born residents make up 23.4 percent of Ottawa's population, in which many come from the United Kingdom, China, India, the United States, Lebanon, Pakistan, Somalia, Iran, the Philippines, Vietnam, Democratic Republic of the Congo, and Haiti.

== Languages ==
The Algonquian languages have been spoken for centuries by the Indigenous peoples and subsequently by the coureurs des bois and voyageurs of the Ottawa valley during the 1600s and 1700s. Starting in the mid-1800s, Irish settlers of the Ottawa valley develop a distinct dialect referred to as "Ottawa Valley Twang". Traces of "Valley Twang" although rare, can still be heard in the valley's more isolated areas.

The city offers municipal services in both of Canada's official languages (Canadian English and Canadian French). 367,035 people, or 36.45% of Ottawa's population, can speak both languages. As such it is the largest city in Canada where municipal services are offered in both English and French. However, the city is not officially bilingual in law. Those who identify their mother tongue as English constitute 58.18 percent, while those with French as their mother tongue make up 12.52 percent of the population. In terms of respondents' knowledge of one or both official languages, 60.60 percent and 1.42 percent of the population have knowledge of English only and French only, respectively; while 37.2 percent have knowledge of both official languages. An additional 23.06 percent list languages other than English and French as their mother tongue. These include Arabic (4.33%), Chinese (3.32%), Spanish (1.4%), Italian (0.79%), and many others.

Canada Census Mother Tongue - Ottawa, Ontario
Census	Total	English		French & English		French		Other	
Year	Responses	Count	Pop %	Count	Pop %	Count	Pop %	Count	Pop %
2021	1,006,965	626,130	62.18%	22,595	2.24%	126,030	12.52%	232,210	23.06%
2016	934,391	594,451	63.62%	12,295	1.31%	127,225	13.61%	200,420	21.49%
2011	883,391	570,591	64.59%	10,755	1.20%	123,925	14.02%	178,120	20.16%
2006	801,275	501,870	62.63%	6,815	0.85%	119,445	14.90%	173,145	21.60%
2001	763,790	485,830	63.61%	7,445	0.97%	115,220	15.08%	155,295	20.33%
1996	318,990	200,870	62.97%	3,335	1.04%	47,115	14.77%	67,670	21.21%

== Ethnicity ==
=== City of Ottawa ===
Pie chart of the ethnic breakdown of Ottawa from the 2021 census.
1. European (64.9%)
2. Black (8.50%)
3. Arab (5.80%)
4. South Asian (5.80%)
5. Chinese (4.60%)
6. Indigenous (2.60%)
7. Southeast Asian (1.50%)
8. Filipino (1.40%)
9. Latin American (1.40%)
10. West Asian (1.30%)
11. Multiple visible minorities (1.10%)
12. Korean (0.40%)
13. Visible minority not included elsewhere (0.40%)
14. Japanese (0.20%)

Members of visible minority groups (non-white/European) constitute 32.5 percent, while those of Indigenous origin make up 2.6% of the total population. The largest visible minority groups are: Black Canadians: 8.5%, Arab Canadians: 5.8%, South Asian Canadians: 5.8%, and Chinese Canadians: 4.6%. Smaller groups include Southeast Asians, Filipinos, Latin Americans, and West Asians.

Panethnic groups in the City of Ottawa (2001−2021)
Panethnic group	2021		2016		2011		2006		2001	
Panethnic group	Pop.	%	Pop.	%	Pop.	%	Pop.	%	Pop.	%
European (Note: Statistic includes all persons that did not make up part of a visible minority or an indigenous identity.)	649,580	64.9%	652,650	71.18%	643,750	74.24%	627,300	78.29%	617,920	80.9%
African	84,765	8.47%	60,205	6.57%	49,650	5.73%	39,070	4.88%	34,645	4.54%
Middle Eastern (Note: Statistic includes total responses of "West Asian" and "Arab" under visible minority section on census.)	71,435	7.14%	49,920	5.44%	39,930	4.61%	30,160	3.76%	25,415	3.33%
South Asian	57,820	5.78%	38,750	4.23%	33,805	3.9%	26,510	3.31%	21,705	2.84%
East Asian (Note: Statistic includes total responses of "Chinese", "Korean", and "Japanese" under visible minority section on census.)	52,610	5.26%	46,340	5.05%	39,110	4.51%	34,560	4.31%	30,625	4.01%
Southeast Asian (Note: Statistic includes total responses of "Filipino" and "Southeast Asian" under visible minority section on census.)	29,280	2.93%	24,405	2.66%	24,180	2.79%	17,510	2.19%	13,525	1.77%
Indigenous	26,395	2.64%	22,960	2.5%	18,180	2.1%	12,250	1.53%	8,625	1.13%
Latin American	14,350	1.43%	11,150	1.22%	10,255	1.18%	8,075	1.01%	6,455	0.85%
Other/Multiracial (Note: Statistic includes total responses of "Visible minority, n.i.e." and "Multiple visible minorities" under visible minority section on census.)	14,690	1.47%	10,470	1.14%	8,230	0.95%	5,835	0.73%	4,870	0.64%
Total responses	1,000,935	98.38%	916,860	98.14%	867,085	98.15%	801,270	98.66%	763,790	98.67%
Total population	1,017,449	100%	934,243	100%	883,391	100%	812,129	100%	774,072	100%
Note: Totals greater than 100% due to multiple origin responses

=== Metro Ottawa ===
Largest ethnic origin in Ottawa-Gatineau by census tract based on the 2021 census

The most common ethnicities in Ottawa-Gatineau as per the 2021 census are Irish (17.5%), French (17.1%), Scottish (13.9%), and English (13.4%).

Panethnic groups in Metro Ottawa (2001−2021)
Panethnic group	2021		2016		2011		2006		2001	
Panethnic group	Pop.	%	Pop.	%	Pop.	%	Pop.	%	Pop.	%
European (Note: 2001-2016: Statistic includes all persons that did not make up part of a visible minority or an indigenous identity. 2021: Statistic includes all persons belonging to the non-indigenous and non-visible minority “White” population group.)	1,036,525	70.78%	981,625	75.47%	951,160	78.24%	917,235	82.11%	888,590	84.57%
African	114,225	7.8%	77,995	6%	60,660	4.99%	45,060	4.03%	38,185	3.63%
Middle Eastern	83,730	5.72%	59,445	4.57%	47,155	3.88%	34,685	3.1%	28,285	2.69%
South Asian	60,780	4.15%	39,980	3.07%	34,795	2.86%	27,130	2.43%	22,280	2.12%
East Asian	57,460	3.92%	49,660	3.82%	41,960	3.45%	36,525	3.27%	31,980	3.04%
Indigenous	46,540	3.18%	38,120	2.93%	30,565	2.51%	20,590	1.84%	13,485	1.28%
Southeast Asian	32,995	2.25%	26,440	2.03%	26,000	2.14%	19,005	1.7%	14,740	1.4%
Latin American	20,625	1.41%	15,630	1.2%	14,270	1.17%	10,630	0.95%	7,655	0.73%
Other/Multiracial	17,095	1.17%	11,815	0.91%	9,175	0.75%	6,260	0.56%	5,560	0.53%
Total responses	1,464,495	98.4%	1,300,730	98.26%	1,215,735	98.33%	1,117,120	98.79%	1,050,755	98.79%
Total population	1,488,307	100%	1,323,783	100%	1,236,324	100%	1,130,761	100%	1,063,664	100%
Note: Totals greater than 100% due to multiple origin responses

=== Future Projections ===
Pan−ethnic Origin Projections (2041)
	Ontario side			Quebec side			Total	
	Population	Regional %	Municipal %	Population	Regional %	Municipal %	Population	%
White (Note: Statistic includes all persons that did not make up part of a visible minority (European or Indigenous))	812,000	54.79%	42.65%	305,000	72.27%	16.02%	1,117,000	58.67%
African	180,000	12.15%	9.45%	57,000	13.51%	2.99%	237,000	12.45%
Middle Eastern	137,000	9.24%	7.20%	30,000	7.11%	1.58%	167,000	8.77%
South Asian	140,000	9.45%	7.35%	4,000	0.95%	0.21%	144,000	7.56%
East Asian	100,000	6.75%	5.25%	10,000	2.37%	0.53%	110,000	5.78%
Southeast Asian	60,000	4.05%	3.15%	4,000	0.95%	0.21%	64,000	3.36%
Latin American	27,000	1.82%	1.42%	9,000	2.13%	0.47%	36,000	1.89%
Native	26,000	1.75%	1.37%	3,000	0.71%	0.16%	29,000	1.52%
Projected Population	1,482,000	100%	77.84%	422,000	100%	22.16%	1,904,000	100%

== Religion ==
=== City of Ottawa ===
In the 2021 Canadian Census, 52.8% of the population belonged to Christian denominations, down from 65.4% in 2011. Catholics were the most common at 30.4%, down from 38.4% in 2011. Protestants were 11.4% of the population (19.5% in 2011), while Christian orthodox were 2.1% and Christians of no specified denomination were 6.4%. Other Christian/Christian related traditions (Including Mormons and Jehovah's Witnesses) made up 2.5%. Non-Christian religions are also very well established in Ottawa, the largest being Islam: 9.9% (6.7% in 2011), Hinduism: 2% (1.4% in 2011), Buddhism: 1.2% (1.3% in 2011), and Judaism: 1.1% (1.2% in 2011.) Residents with no religion and/or secular perspectives make up 31.6% of Ottawa's population, up from 21.8% in 2011.

Religions in the City of Ottawa (only religions with more than 1% of the population listed)
Religion	%
Christianity	52.8%
Catholicism	30.4%
Anglicanism	4.1%
United Church	3.4%
Christian Orthodox	2.1%
Pentecostal (and other Charismatic)	1.2%
Islam	9.9%
Hinduism	2.0%
Others	1.5%
Buddhism	1.2%
Judaism	1.1%
No religion	31.6%

=== Metro Ottawa ===
Largest non-Christian religion in Ottawa-Gatineau CMA by census tract based on the 2021 census

Religious groups in Metro Ottawa (1981−2021)
Religious group	2021		2011		2001		1991		1981	
Religious group	Pop.	%	Pop.	%	Pop.	%	Pop.	%	Pop.	%
Christianity	824,655	56.31%	850,925	69.99%	833,770	79.35%	776,905	85.18%	644,200	90.49%
Irreligion	462,555	31.58%	252,795	20.79%	139,705	13.3%	93,285	10.23%	48,050	6.75%
Islam	114,780	7.84%	65,880	5.42%	41,725	3.97%	17,585	1.93%	4,325	0.61%
Hinduism	21,205	1.45%	12,295	1.01%	8,150	0.78%	4,785	0.52%	2,900	0.41%
Buddhism	12,185	0.83%	12,860	1.06%	9,985	0.95%	6,015	0.66%	2,165	0.3%
Judaism	11,395	0.78%	10,980	0.9%	11,325	1.08%	9,910	1.09%	8,470	1.19%
Sikhism	6,730	0.46%	3,445	0.28%	2,645	0.25%	1,575	0.17%	605	0.08%
Indigenous spirituality	745	0.05%	375	0.03%	—N/a	—N/a	—N/a	—N/a	—N/a	—N/a
Other	10,250	0.7%	6,185	0.51%	3,445	0.33%	2,025	0.22%	1,205	0.17%
Total responses	1,464,500	98.4%	1,215,735	96.88%	1,050,755	98.79%	912,100	99.05%	711,920	99.16%
Total population	1,488,307	100%	1,254,919	100%	1,063,664	100%	920,857	100%	717,978	100%

== Populations per neighbourhood (old City of Ottawa) ==
The following are populations of neighbourhoods that generally correspond to Statistics Canada census tracts.

Neighbourhood	1991	1996	2001	2006	2011	2016	2021	Area (km^{2})	Density (per km^{2})	Census tract(s)
Alta Vista (west)	8,923	8,901	9,154	9,459	10,197	9,973	10,567	4.76	2220.0	5050006.00 5050005.00
Bel-Air Heights-Bel-Air Park-Braemar Park-Copeland Park	9,671	9,329	9,177	8,613	8,967	8,968	9,441	2.66	3549.2	5050023.01 and 5050024.00
Britannia-Michele Heights-Lincoln Heights-Belltown	11,749	12,144	12,088	11,435	11,469	11,292	11,541	2.80	4121.8	5050029.00 and 5050030.00
Carleton Heights (south)	2,477	2,435	2,437	2,365	2,872	2,888	2,901	1.51	1921.2	5050020.02
Carlington	12,283	12,210	12,593	11,512	11,882	11,638	12,384	3.88	3191.8	5050021.00 and 5050022.00
Carlingwood	3,165	3,193	3,309	3,336	3,376	3,558	3,622	0.78	4643.6	5050032.01
Carson Meadows-Rockcliffe Mews-Carson Grove (Quarries)	3,978	4,220	4,418	5,638	5,561	5,786	6,158	1.84	3346.7	5050062.01
Central Park	N/A (Note: Central Park's Census Tract did not exist during these censuses. The neighbourhood was built in the late 1990s)		1,680	3,403	3,832	3,888	3,970	0.91	4362.6	5050023.02
Centretown (incl. Golden Triangle)	19,238	20,293	21,159	20,513	21,536	23,823	25,687	2.08	12349.5	5050040.00 5050039.00 5050038.00 5050037.00 (5050037.01 and 5050037.02 in 2021) 5050049.00
Centretown West (Dalhousie; incl. Glebe Annex)	12,170	12,266	12,786	11,915	12,022	11,536	12,601	1.94	6495.4	5050041.00 5050042.00 5050035.00
Civic Hospital	3,533	3,628	3,483	3,440	3,656	3,631	3,564	1.28	2784.4	5050034.00
Downtown	3,380	3,743	3,620	3,718	4,123	4,876	5,501	1.26	4365.9	5050048.00
Elmvale Acres	3,469	3,438	3,354	3,254	3,280	3,271	3,313	1.03	3216.5	5050009.00
Forbes	5,327	5,042	5,457	5,283	5,345	5,304	5,549	1.37	4050.4	5050061.00
Foster Farm-Queensway Terrace North-Britannia Heights	6,573	6,798	7,192	6,800	6,844	6,649	6,826	1.97	3465.0	5050028.00
The Glebe	11,375	11,224	11,369	10,886	11,184	11,559	11,922	2.56	4657.0	5050019.00 5050018.00 5050036.00
Greenboro	(Note: Greenboro and South Keys combined were in the same Census Tract with a population of 10,468)	8,548	9,884	11,314	12,113	12,095	11,965	3.95	3029.1	5050001.05 5050001.06
Hawthorne Meadows	4,102	4,124	4,249	3,938	3,787	3,866	3,975	0.63	6309.5	5050010.00
Heron Gate-Ellwood (incl. Banff-Ledbury, Heatherington)	11,680	12,180	13,119	12,203	12,694	12,663	13,085	2.43	5384.8	5050007.02 5050001.01
Heron Park	3,818	3,752	3,929	3,891	3,829	3,824	4,147	1.88	2205.9	5050004.00
Highland Park-McKellar Park-Woodroffe North	9,707	9,859	9,969	9,873	10,331	11,121	11,237	2.88	3901.7	5050033.01 and 5050032.02
Hintonburg-Mechanicsville	8,322	9,200	9,588	8,908	9,041	9,282	10,217	1.70	6010.0	5050046.00 5050043.00
Hunt Club Estate	(Note: Hunt Club Estate and Hunt Club Woods/Uplands combined were in the same Census Tract with a population of 7,716)	3,845	5,185	4,982	5,090	5,116	5,194	1.37	3,791.2	5050002.05
Hunt Club Park	5,033	8,056	8,956	8,903	8,937	8,825	8,556	5.58	1533.3	5050001.08 5050001.07
Hunt Club Woods		3,887	2,565	2,781	2,673	2,609	2,666	4.49	593.8	5050002.06
Laurentian View (Hampton-Iona)	2,950	2,951	2,943	2,782	2,852	3,198	3,630	1.02	3558.8	5050033.02
LeBreton Flats	56	45	50	57	373	620	847	0.84	1008.3	5050047.00
Lower Town-ByWard Market	10,550	10,463	11,134	11,377	12,183	12,856	13,529	2.06	6567.5	5050055.00 5050054.00 5050056.00 5050053.00
Manor Park	7,437	8,055	7,970	7,652	7,665	7,716	8,070	2.90	2782.8	5050059.00 5050060.00
New Edinburgh-Lindenlea	5,264	5,371	5,260	5,459	5,311	5,385	5,634	1.42	3967.6	5050057.00 5050058.00
Ottawa East (north)	4,467	4,458	5,865	4,907	5,110	5,190	6,273	1.11	5651.4	5050015.00
Ottawa South-Rideau Gardens	8,108	8,027	8,160	8,168	8,462	8,638	8,739	2.03	4304.9	5050017.00 5050016.00
Overbrook-Castle Heights	9,411	9,579	9,839	9,437	9,650	9,289	10,258	3.04	3374.3	5050013.00 5050012.00
Playfair Park	2,126	2,126	2,343	2,271	2,254	2,230	2,463	0.84	2932.1	5050007.01
Quinterra	26	50	911	1,104	1,363	1,381	1,346	1.18	1140.7	5050002.04
Redwood	4,394	4,190	4,293	4,095	3,817	3,856	3,896	0.75	5194.7	5050027.00
Rideauview-Courtland Park	5,800	5,963	6,537	5,792	5,504	5,008	5,720	5.75	994.8	5050020.01
Ridgeview-Parkway Park-Queensway Terrace South-Kenson Park	5,396	5,611	5,635	5,448	5,355	5,367	5,542	2.22	2496.4	5050026.00
Riverside Park (north)	5,064	4,655	5,211	4,581	4,564	4,617	4,692	3.20	1466.3	5050003.00
Riverside Park South-Mooney's Bay	3,406	3,220	3,086	2,923	2,893	2,885	3,030	2.58	1174.4	5050002.01
Riverview-Sheffield Glen-Eastway Gardens	14,498	14,747	15,600	15,177	15,544	15,564	16,587	11.07	1498.4	5050011.03 5050011.04 5050011.01
Sandy Hill	11,938	12,697	13,232	12,078	12,451	12,070	12,871	2.07	6217.9	5050050.00 5050051.00 5050014.00 5050052.00
South Keys		2,859	2,982	2,777	2,849	2,718	2,865	1.36	2106.6	5050001.04
Urbandale (Canterbury)	4,906	4,863	4,788	4,686	4,597	4,622	4,836	1.55	3120.0	5050008.00
Urbandale Acres-Guildwood Estates	4,141	3,929	3,877	3,786	3,719	3,731	3,723	1.21	3076.9	5050007.03
Viscount Alexander Park (CFB Rockcliffe, Wateridge, Fairhaven)	2,907	3,395	2,870	2,069	1,724	1,686	2,737	4.77	573.8	5050062.02
Wellington Village (Hampton Park)	2,394	2,451	2,493	2,409	2,564	2,547	2,525	0.68	3713.2	5050044.00
Western Community (Hunt Club Chase)	3,724	3,681	3,520	3,575	3,511	3,470	3,445	1.52	2266.4	5050002.02
Westboro Village-Westboro Beach-Champlain Park	6,082	6,847	6,912	7,396	8,135	8,450	9,061	3.27	2770.9	5050045.00 (5050045.01 and 5050045.02 in 2021)
Whitehaven-Glabar Park-McKellar Heights	5,376	5,419	5,388	5,506	5,329	5,514	5,749	2.48	2318.1	5050025.00
Woodpark	5,409	5,354	5,392	5,305	5,341	5,349	5,554	1.11	5003.6	5050031.00
