= Parkway Park =

Coordinates: 45.3531°N 75.7723°W

- Neighbourhood
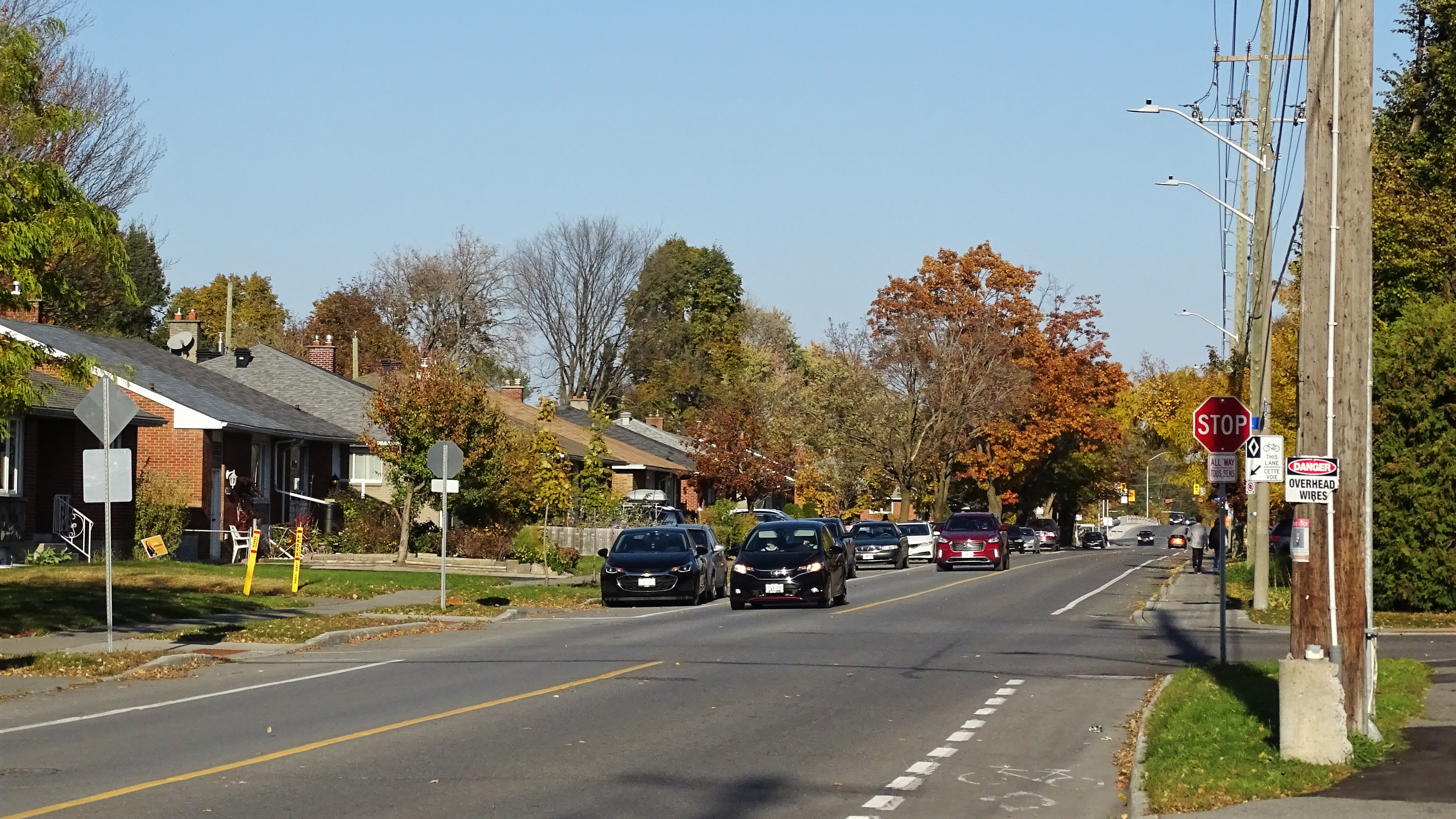
- Iris Street
- Interactive map of Parkway Park
- Country: Canada
- Province: Ontario
- City: Ottawa

Government
  - MPs: Anita Vandenbeld
  - MPPs: Chandra Pasma
  - Councillors: Laine Johnson

Area
  - Total: 0.85 km^{2} (0.33 sq mi)

Population (2021)
  - Total: 2,500 - 3,000
- Canada 2021 Census
- Time zone: UTC-5 (Eastern (EST))

Parkway Park is a neighbourhood in College Ward in Ottawa, Ontario, Canada. It is bounded to the north by the Queensway, to the west by Cobden Road, to the south by Baseline Road and to the east by Pinecrest Creek and the OC Transpo Transitway.

Developed during the late 1950s and early 1960s along with the nearby neighbourhoods of Kenson Park, Queensway Terrace North and South, Bel-Air Park and Ridgeview.

The community is mostly middle class. In the Iris, Cobden and Elmira areas there are community housing projects. To the west of the projects is a small shopping strip on Cobden.

Around Baseline, Highgate and Westbury there are three-story apartment buildings owned by Minto. Many Algonquin College students live there.

Parkway Park is home to three schools: Terre-des-Jerres, Bishop Hamilton Montessori School and Joan D'Arc. Joan D'Arc is a girls private school (the school used to be Queensway Public School until its closure in 1999). Terre-des-Jerres recently moved from the former Whitehaven Public School location. The built used to be Des Laurier High School which moved the former J. S. Woodsworth Secondary School location on Chesteron and Viewmount Drive in Parkwood Hills.

It is also home to the 2 parks, Parkway Park and Pinecrest Recreation Park with a baseball diamond. The Pinecrest Recreation Centre features meeting rooms, a gym, a swimming pool and a hockey arena a named after Canadian skater Barbara Ann Scott. Next to the arena there is a court named after Barbara Ann Scott with townhouses.
