= Pinecrest =

Pinecrest or Pine Crest may refer to:

== Places ==
=== Canada ===
- Pinecrest, a station on the Transitway (Ottawa)

=== United States ===
- Pinecrest, California
- Pinecrest, Florida, in Miami-Dade County
- Pinecrest, Hillsborough County, Florida
- Pinecrest, Monroe County, Florida, a ghost town
- Pine Crest, Tennessee
- Pinecrest (Elkins, West Virginia), listed on the NRHP in West Virginia

== Schools ==
- Pinecrest Academy, in Cumming, Georgia, U.S.
- Pinecrest Bible Training Center, in Chesapeake, Virginia, formerly in Salisbury Center, New York, U.S.
- Pinecrest High School, Southern Pines, North Carolina, U.S.
- Pinecrest Public School, in Ottawa, Canada
- Pine Crest School, with campuses in Fort Lauderdale, Florida and Boca Raton, Florida, U.S.
