= Laurentian High School =

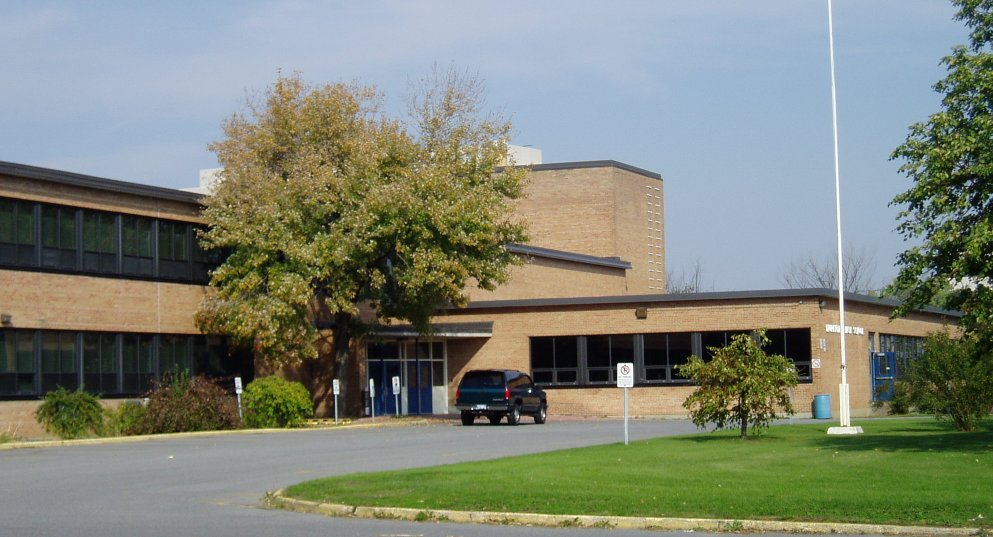

Location
- 1357 Baseline Road; Ottawa, Ontario; Canada; 45.3632°N 75.7379°W

Information
- Motto: Consiglio et Animo (By wisdom and by courage)
- Founded: 1958
- Status: Demolished
- Closed: 2005
- School board: Ottawa Carleton District School Board
- Grades: 9-13
- Language: English, French
- Campus: Urban
- Colours: Red, Blue and White
- Team name: Lions
- Communities served: Bel-Air Heights, Copeland Park, Carlington, Central Park
- Feeder schools: J. H. Putman Intermediate School, D. Roy Kennedy Public School, W. E. Gowling Public School, St. Joseph Intermediate School
- Public transit access: 118

Laurentian High School was a high school in the Central Park neighbourhood of Ottawa, Ontario, Canada. The school opened in 1958 and provided education to grade 9 through 12 (and 13 from 1961 to 2003) through an unsemestered curriculum as established by the Ontario Ministry of Education.

== History ==
The project generated some controversy as the Collegiate Board presented a plan that included an auditorium, two gymnasiums, and a cafeteria. The Ottawa Property Owners Association, with support of Ottawa mayor Charlotte Whitton, objected to these as expensive and unneeded. The dispute delayed the construction of the school for some time. The sod was turned by Claude Biseau, former President of Carleton University on September 11, 1956. Ottawa mayor George H. Nelms placed the granite cornerstone on June 24, 1957. When the school opened in September 1958, 600 students enrolled, which was twice the number that had been expected. The opening of LHS reduced overcrowding at Nepean High School and Fisher Park High School.

The school was built during the same period as Rideau High School and Ridgemont High School and features the same base design by architects Hazelgrove, Lithwick and Lambert. The school had a library, science labs, tech shops, a cafeteria, an auditorium, two gymnasiums, tennis courts, and a sports field with an oval track known as the R.D. Campbell Stadium.

Construction continued for the entire first year of the school. Over time, Laurentian expanded twice, bringing its capacity to 1,143 students. By 1957, a new wing added 23 classes and an auditorium seating 750. The R. D. Campbell stadium, was named after the former director of athletics at Glebe Collegiate Institute was constructed in 1958.

LHS primarily served the neighbourhoods of Bel-Air Heights, Copeland Park, and Carlington. In the years following the school's opening, the area saw rapid development.

During the late 1960s and early 1970s the Ottawa School Board experimented at LHS with extended freedom for students, allowing optional attendance at class and exemption from exams if they maintained consistently high grades. In the mid-1970s, LHS had an enrollment of 1,700 students while Nepean High School and Glebe Collegiate Institute were suffering declining enrollment. By 1984, 300 students from the LHS catchment zone were on loan to other schools.

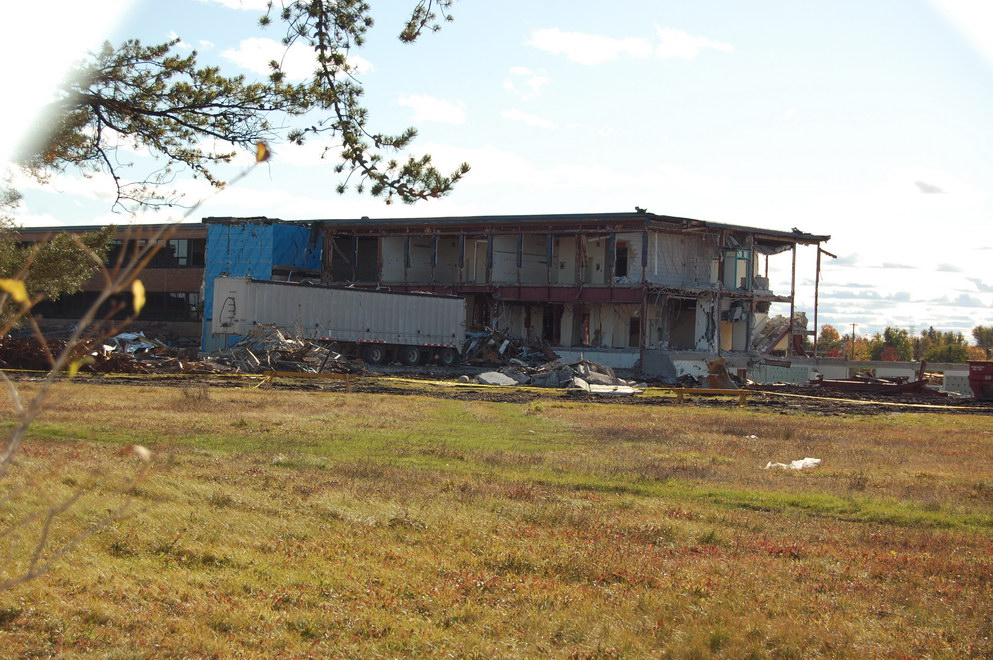
Laurentian High School being demolished in October 2009

By 2004, student enrollment at Laurentian had fallen to 564, resulting in busing costs of $3,848. LHS offered a full high school curriculum including over 100 basic, advanced and enriched courses, and special technical options. With the rezoning of a section of the Central Experimental Farm, thousands of homes were being built in the surrounding community of Central Park. On December 16, 2004, the Ottawa-Carleton District School Board decided to close both LHS and J. S. Woodsworth Secondary School due to declining enrollment. The final LHS students completed classes in June 2005, and the school was closed effective in September.

LHS's buildings and 15.5-acre property were offered for sale in 2007. The City of Ottawa was interested in keeping this community landmark in public hands, but the School Board was unwilling to compromise on the sale price. The Board subsequently sold the school on July 18, 2007, to $21.26 million to Clyde Baseline Developments Inc., a subsidiary of SmartCentres.

In 2008, the school served as the filming site of Canadian television series Family Biz. In July 2009, the school site was turned over the Ottawa's newly formed emergency response squad for disaster simulation manoeuvres.

The school was demolished in 2009 and the brownfields were remediated including clean up of asbestos and heating oil in exchange for incentives of $1.8 million of property tax rebates. The property was converted to $60-million mixed-use development, known as Laurentian Place. The site features two- and three-storey buildings containing stores and offices, as well as a Walmart Supercenter.

== Fight song ==
Henry Bonnenberg, who concurrently served as director of music of the HMCS Carleton Band while teaching at LHS, composed the music for the fight song while Joe Upton, the physical education teacher composed the lyrics.
