= Rideau High School =

High school in Ottawa, Ontario, Canada

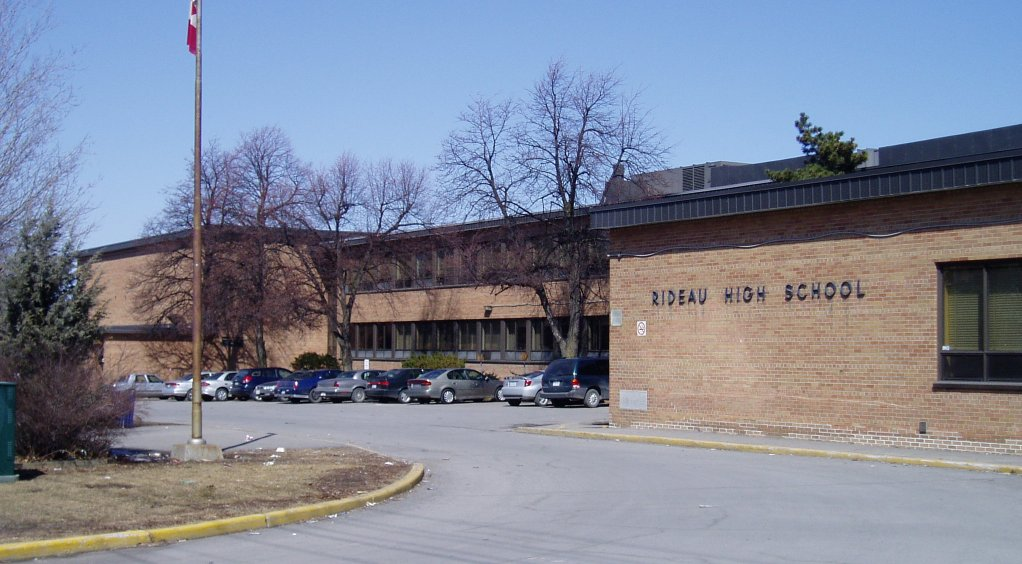

Location
- 815 St. Laurent Boulevard; Ottawa, Ontario, K1K 3A7; Canada; 45.434721°N 75.642339°W

Information
- Established: 1957
- Closed: 2017
- School board: Ottawa-Carleton District School Board
- Principal: Steve Spidell
- Enrollment: 550 (2013)
- Campus: urban
- Colours: Blue and White
- Mascot: Ram
- Team name: Rams
- Feeder schools: Queen Elizabeth Public School, York Street Public School, Henry Munro Middle School
- Website: rideauhs.ocdsb.ca

Rideau High School was an Ottawa-Carleton District School Board high school in Ottawa, Ontario, Canada . It was located at 815 St. Laurent Boulevard in the east end of the city on the edge of Vanier. It was located next to the Queen Elizabeth Public School.

== History ==
The school opened in 1957 under Principal E. D. Hendry. It was the second of a series of ten high schools built by the local school board to cope with rapidly rising attendance and the baby boom. The project generated some controversy as the Collegiate Board presented a plan that included an auditorium, double gym, and a cafeteria. The Ottawa Property Owners association objected to these as expensive and unneeded luxuries, and the mayor Charlotte Whitton agreed. The dispute delayed the construction of the school for some time.

In 1971-72, Rideau High School concert and stage bands produced an album.

In an October 6, 2009 report by the OCDSB, closure of the school was recommended, with its current students to be redirected to Gloucester High School. and incoming students to be re-directed to Lisgar Collegiate Institute (English) or Glebe Collegiate Institute (French Immersion). However, due to a vote on December 7, 2009 (wherein the OCDSB board members voted to reject the recommendation), the school remained open.

Rideau was designed to hold 800 students. The enrolment fell to about 550 students by 2013, with the rest of the building populated by the children of two day-care programs and an adult English program.

In March 2017, the Ottawa-Carleton District Board of Trustees voted to close Rideau High School, effective June 2017, and redirect all of its students and programs to Gloucester High School. The reasons for closure were cited as declining enrollment (student population for 2016–2017 was 413) and the consequent reduction in programming opportunities for students.

== Architecture ==
Rideau was built at the same time as Laurentian High School and Ridgemont High School and has the same base design by architects Hazelgrove, Lithwick and Lambert with well-lit efficient circulation, and a large auditoria. The double gymnasium block projected into a large sports field and oval track. For adults, commercial and business classes were offered in the evenings. There are tennis courts, a large parking lot, well equipped science labs, technical shops and a library. There are two storey t-shaped wings for classrooms, with the gym, auditorium and cafeteria in bumped out blocks. The building was constructed of orange-buff brick with contrasting brick in perpendicular bars on the fly over the auditorium stage. At Rideau the auditorium stage fly was decorated at the corners in contrasting brick. There were horizontal bands of windows in silver aluminum, which were later retrofitted with tinted glass in brown anodized frames. An entrance forecourt is reached by a circular drive. The main door is through a vestibule set at an angle between a classroom wing and the cafeteria block. The school's most architecturally interesting feature is a smokestack with a heavy fire door at the base for cleaning out the ash and soot.

The school was renovated in the early 1990s at the cost of several million dollars. Although the renovation project was a success that helped modernize the school, the capital investment upset many members of the OCDSB as the school was perceived to be declining in both student enrollment as well as student performance. Many members of the OCDSB criticized the financial investment into the renovation project as they felt that the funds could be better used at other institutions.

== Programs ==
Rideau was a mixed stream school offering Academic (advanced), Applied (general) and Essential level courses. The school also had a significant English as a Second Language program, with 63.2% of the student population enrolled. Its specialization in ESL programs made it one of the most multicultural schools in the city in such programs. Rideau also had programs for special needs students as well as a daycare for the children of young mother students (with a population of 21.3% of students enrolled) and strong technological programming.

== After Closure / Community Hub ==
The building/site has become a community hub. The school board published a business plan from November 2017, and in January 2018 the provincial government announced funding support, with this description of the project: "This proposed community hub is a joint project between two community organizations [Rideau-Rockcliffe Community Centre and Odawa Native Friendship Centre] focused on Indigenous and non-Indigenous services including: alternative secondary school, urban Indigenous healthy living, life-long care, programs such as those for homelessness and bail, community justice, healing and wellness, cultural resources, a food bank, Indigenous job fair, housing, HIV/AIDS awareness, employment and training, and Inuit supports for students and youth. Other community services will include: health, social, recreation, life-long learning, and community engagement services." In 2023, the all-volunteer Ottawa Family Cinema, which has been in operation since 1977, began screening children's films in the auditorium after being forced from their prior location at Notre Dame High School during the Covid-19 pandemic.

== Notable former students ==
- Cindy Shatto, former Olympic diver

== See also ==
- List of high schools in Ontario
