= Central Park, Ottawa =

Central Park
- Neighbourhood
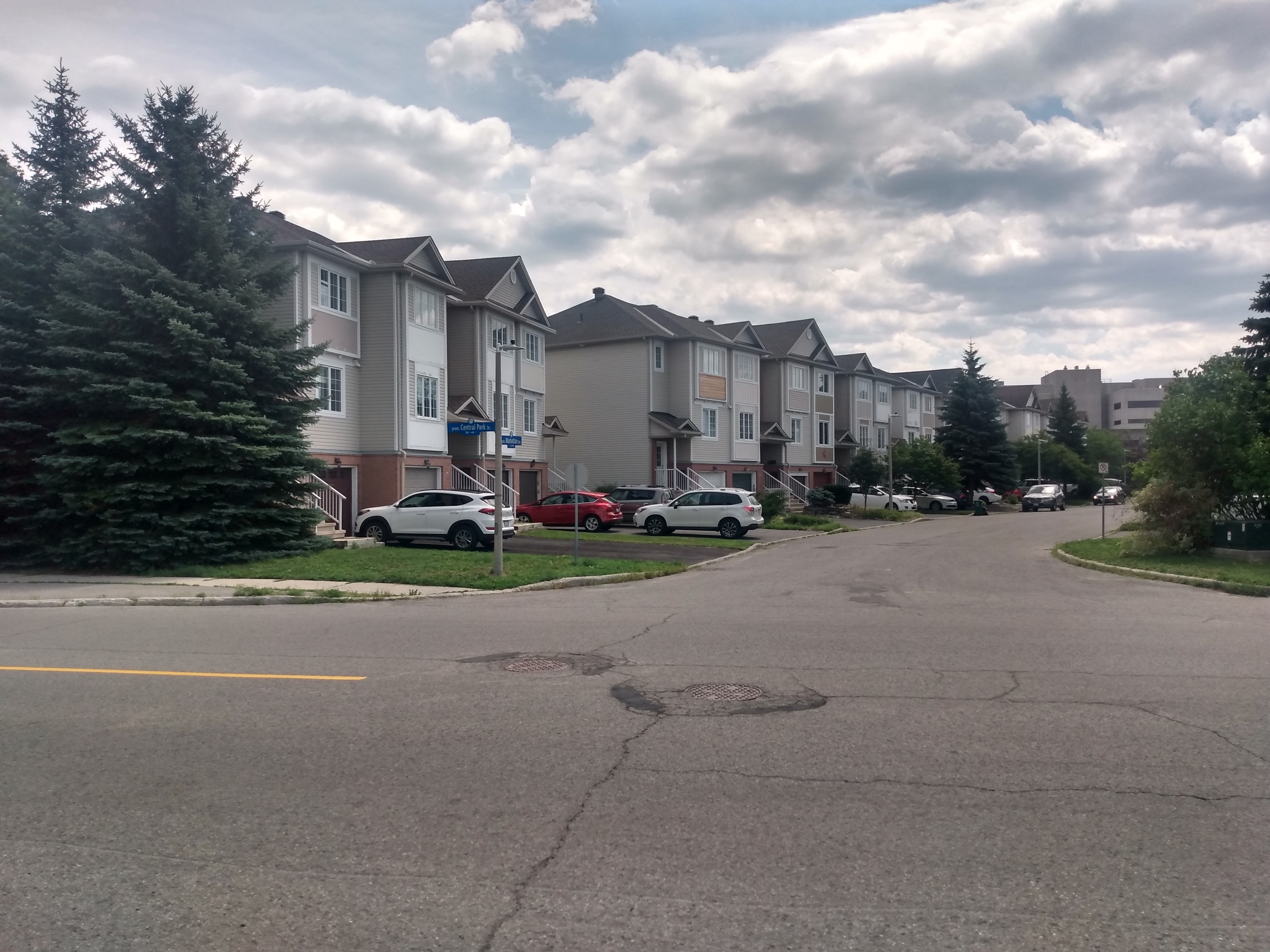
- Houses on Manhattan Crescent

- Location within Ottawa
- Coordinates: 45°22′05″N 75°44′15″W
- Country: Canada
- Province: Ontario
- City: Ottawa
- Land purchased by developer: 1996

Government
  - MPs: Anita Vandenbeld
  - MPPs: Chandra Pasma
  - Councillors: Riley Brockington
  - Governing body: Ottawa's Central Park Community Association

Area
  - Total: 0.872 km^{2} (0.337 sq mi)
- Elevation: 100 m (330 ft)

Population (Canada 2016 Census)
  - Total: 3,760
  - Density: 4,310/km^{2} (11,200/sq mi)
- Time zone: Eastern (EST)
- Forward sortation area: K2C
- Website: Community Association

Central Park (French: Parc Central) is a neighbourhood in River Ward in the west end of Ottawa, Ontario, Canada. It is bounded on the east by Merivale Road, on the south by Baseline Road, on the west by Clyde Avenue and on the north by the Carlington neighbourhood. The population of the neighbourhood in 2016 was 3,888 in an area of 0.91 km^{2}. It more than doubled its population between 2001 and 2006 as the neighbourhood expanded. Excluding the residences south of Baseline which are included in the Census Tract, the population of the neighbourhood is 3,760.

The neighbourhood is fairly new, having been built in the late 1990s and early 2000s. Before Central Park was built, the land was originally part of the Central Experimental Farm until the Regional Municipality of Ottawa-Carleton bought it in 1987. The community used to be a wooded area. Ashcroft Homes bought the area from the region in 1996.

Census Tract
Year	Pop.	±%
2001	1,680	—
2006	3,403	+102.6%
2011	3,832	+12.6%
2016	3,888	+1.5%

Central Park is known for its New York City themed street names. The name of the neighbourhood itself is taken from Central Park.

== Street names ==
- Central Park
- Fordham
- Festive
- Celebration
- Bloomingdale
- Trump
- Whitestone
- Cedar Park
- State
- Grenwich
- Staten
- Coleridge
- Grammercy
- Niki
- Scout
- Manhattan
- Yorkville
- Crystal Park
- Gotham
- Rutgers

== Features ==
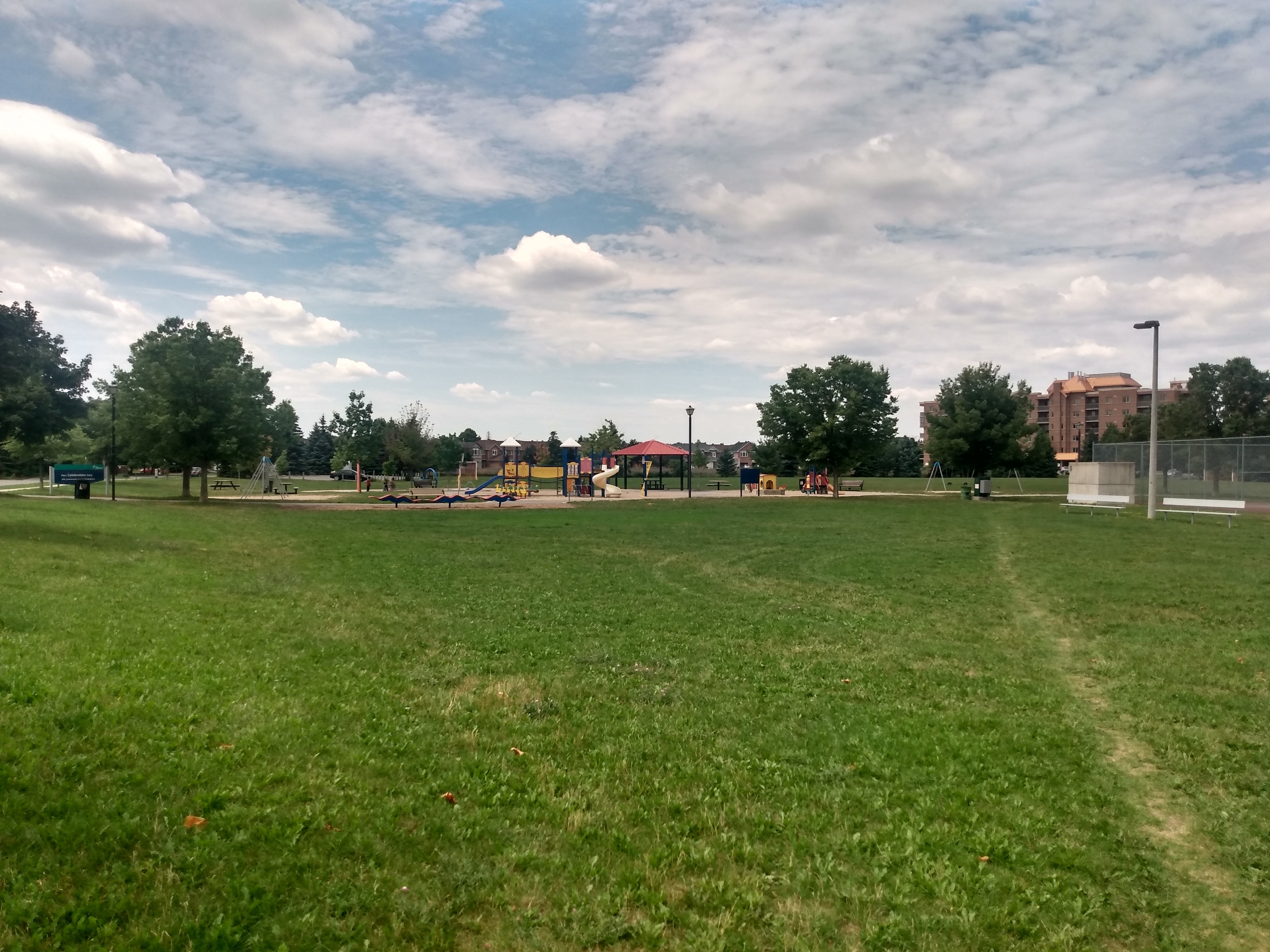
Celebration Park

The neighbourhood includes the Boy Scouts of Canada Museum as well as a park, called Celebration Park. There are many small parks in the neighbourhood such as "Alphabet Park". Many apartments, town-homes and single family homes are in the neighbourhood, developed by the builder Ashcroft. There is also a retirement community, Park Place by Alavida Lifestyles. For shopping there is a plaza at the corner of Central Park and Merivale Road, Laurentian Place, a close distance to Westgate Shopping Centre and big box stores on Merivale Road .

== Schooling ==
There are many young families in the neighbourhood and there is a big range for schools. Children can go to Agincourt Public School (both English and French Immersion, WE Gowling (English only), Broadview Public School, or Sir Winston Churchill Public School (K-Grade 8). For Middle school, they can go to JH Putman (6-8) or Fisher Park Public School. Laurentian High School was originally the community's high school. However, the public school board decided to close it in 2005. The former high was bought by Smart Centres and was demolished in 2009 and in 2011 became Laurentian Place featuring Walmart and other stores. For high schools, students go to Nepean High School, Glebe, Woodroffe, Elizabeth Wyn Wood or Merivale High School. It is also a short distance from Algonquin College and Carleton University.

== Neighbourhood controversy ==
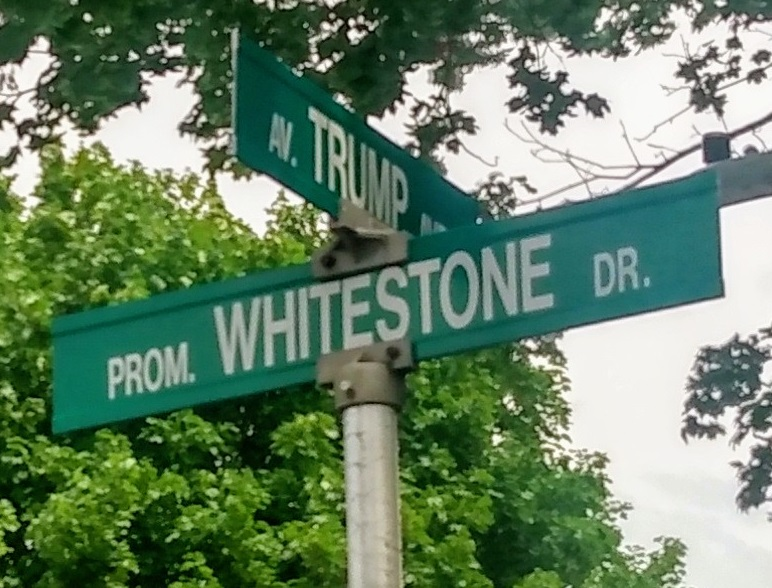
Street sign for Whitestone Dr. and Trump Ave. Trump Avenue's name sparked controversy after the election of US President Donald Trump, for whom the street is indirectly named

Central Park's Trump Avenue drew attention in the weeks prior to the American election on November 8, 2016 on the CBC, CTV, and Radio Canada. A petition emerged on Change.org calling for the City of Ottawa to change the name of Trump Avenue. Following Trump's departure from the presidency and in the aftermath of the 2021 storming of the United States Capitol, there were plans for the residents of the street to vote for a name change. Residents of the street voted on changing the name, with 21 households in favour, and 21 against, failing to reach 50%+1 mark of the 62 households on the street.

During Trump's second administration, amidst an ongoing trade war with between Canada and the United States, the Ottawa City Council voted unanimously to rename Trump Avenue, in response to Trump's executive order renaming Lake Ontario to Lake America.
