= Copeland Park, Ottawa =

Copeland Park
- Neighbourhood
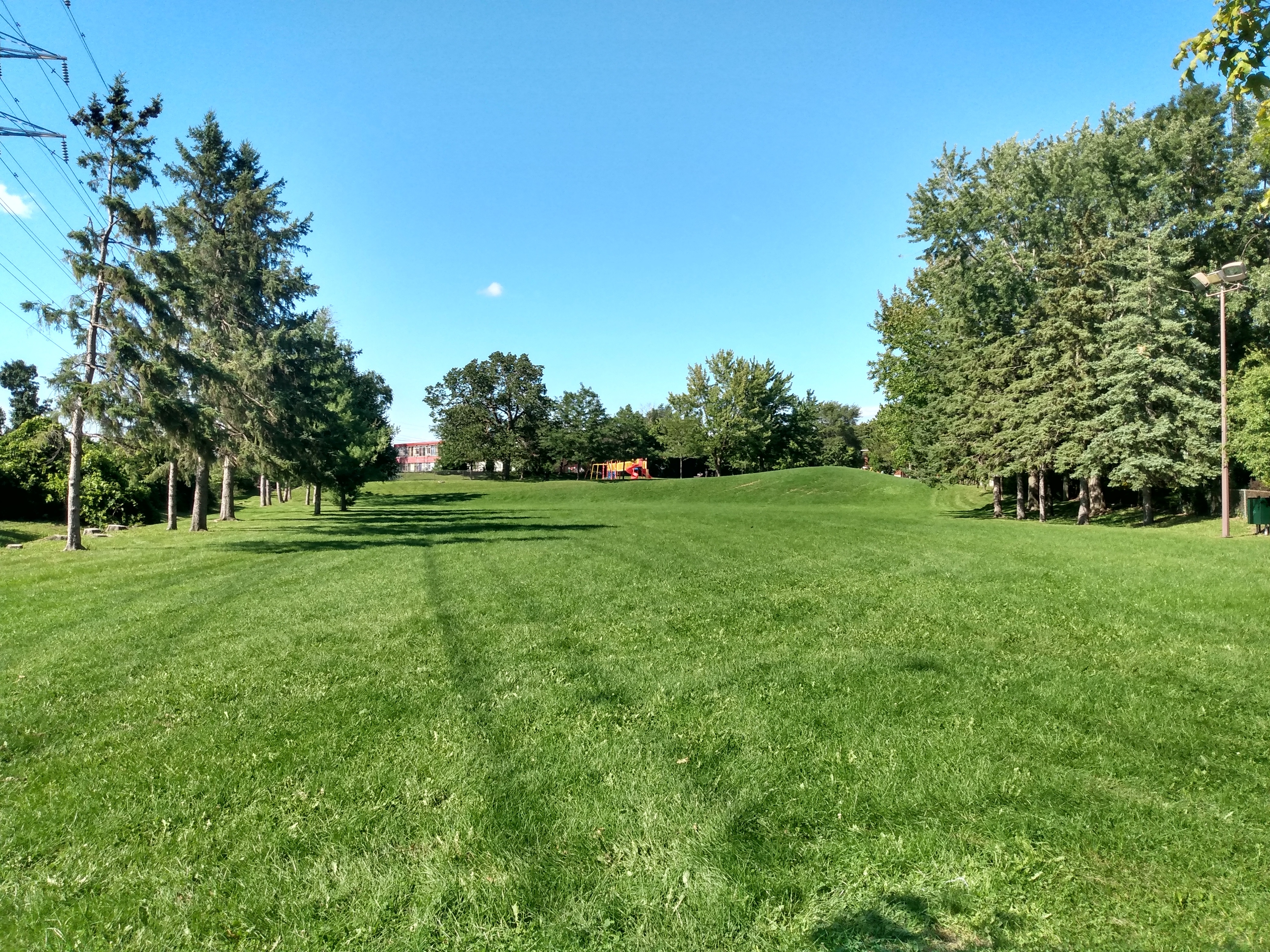
- Copeland Park

- Location in Ottawa
- Coordinates: 45.364358°N 75.747778°W
- Country: Canada
- Province: Ontario
- City: Ottawa
- Electoral district: Ottawa West—Nepean
- First house: 1956

Government
  - MP: Anita Vandenbeld
  - MPP: Chandra Pasma
  - Councillor: Laine Johnson

Area
  - Total: 0.809 km^{2} (0.312 sq mi)
- Elevation: 95 m (312 ft)
- Canada 2006 Census
- Time zone: UTC−5 (Eastern (EST))
  - Summer (DST): UTC−4 (EDT)
- Forward sortation area: K2C

Copeland Park (French: Parc Copeland) is a neighbourhood located in College Ward in the west end of Ottawa, Canada. It is bounded to the west by Agincourt Road, to the south by Baseline Road, to the east by Clyde Avenue and to the north by the Central Experimental Farm Pathway.

The community was built in the late 1950s and early 1960s by A.B. Taylor Construction Ltd. The first home was built in 1956. In the 1970s, a 21-storey high-rise called the Castle Hill was built at the corner of Castle Hill Crescent and Clyde Avenue. The high-rise is owned by Minto. During that same decade more townhouses and three high-rises were built on Baseline Road at Clyde Avenue. The neighbourhood is mostly surrounded by woods.

The neighbourhood is home to Copeland Park on Navaho Drive, Agincourt Park and Greenlawn Park. There are two schools: Agincourt Public School and Tancook Bell School (also home to a daycare, the building was St. Daniel's Catholic School until 2001) Laurentian High School was located on the corner of Baseline and Clyde until it closed in 2005 to make way for a Wal-Mart shopping complex and an office building. The community is also home to Trinity United Church, located on Maitland Avenue.

The population of the neighbourhood is roughly 4150.
