= Bel-Air Heights =

- Neighbourhood
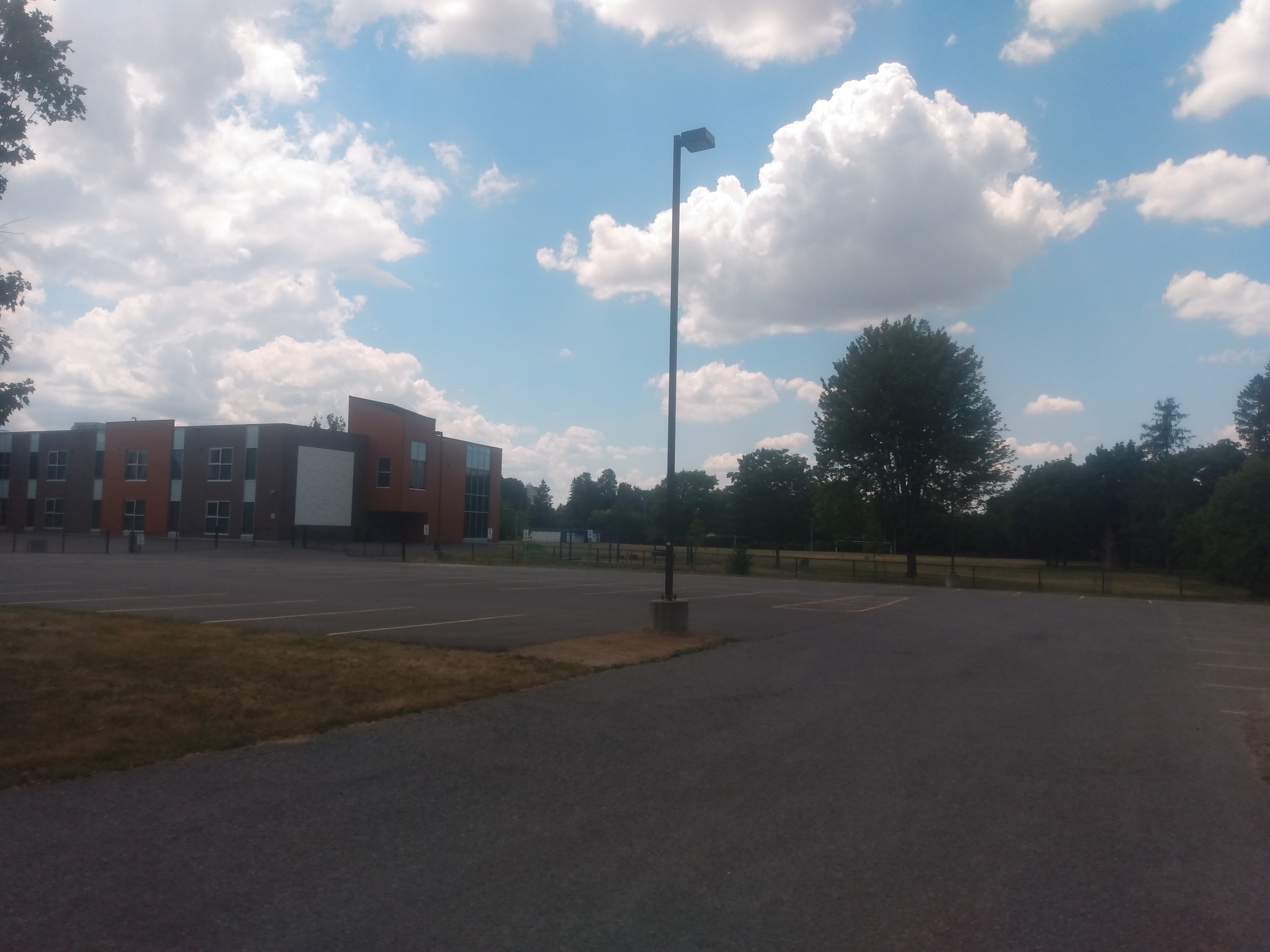
- Agincourt Public School

- Location in Ottawa
- Coordinates: 45.357785°N 75.75503°W
- Country: Canada
- Province: Ontario
- City: Ottawa

Government
  - MP: Anita Vandenbeld
  - MPP: Chandra Pasma
  - Councillor: Laine Johnson
  - Bel-Air Community Association Co-Presidents: Kathryn Loyen, Jean Mullan

Area
  - Total: 0.659 km^{2} (0.254 sq mi)
- Elevation: 85 m (279 ft)
- Time zone: UTC−5 (Eastern (EST))
  - Summer (DST): UTC−4 (EDT)
- Forward sortation area: K2C

Bel-Air Heights (also spelled Bel Air Heights; French: Hauteurs Bel Air) is a neighbourhood in College Ward in the west end of Ottawa, Ontario, Canada. It is bounded on the east by Agincourt Road, on the south by Baseline Road, on the west by Navaho Drive and on the north by the Central Experimental Farm Pathway. The neighbourhood contains mostly middle class housing.

Most of the homes were built in 1959 and 1960. Construction began by the Campeau Corporation in June 1958. There is a small number apartments on Baseline Rd. and Navaho Dr. that were built later. The neighbourhood has three parks; Agincourt Park, Ainsley Park and Navaho Park. Schools in the neighbourhood include Agincourt Public School, J. H. Putman Public School, Charlotte Lemieux French School and Woodroffe High School.

The population of the area is roughly 2,500.

Along with Bel-Air Park and Braemar Park, the area is part of the Bel-Air Community Association.
