= Bel-Air Park =

- Neighbourhood
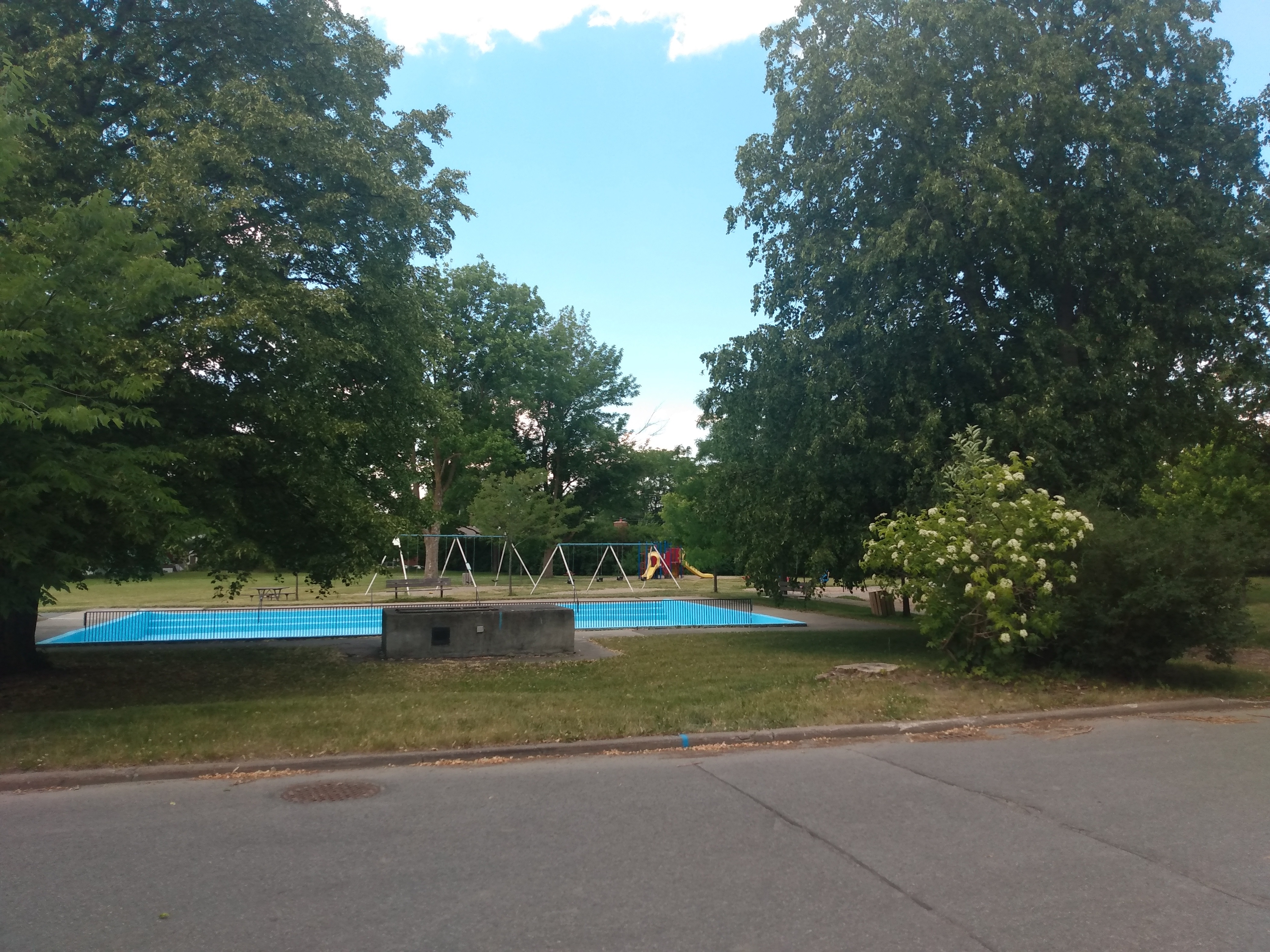
- Bel-Air Park

- Location in Ottawa
- Coordinates: 45°21′30″N 75°45′50″W
- Country: Canada
- Province: Ontario
- City: Ottawa

Government
  - MP: Anita Vandenbeld
  - MPP: Chandra Pasma
  - Councillor: Laine Johnson
  - Bel-Air Community Association Co-Presidents: Kathryn Loyen, Jean Mullan
- Elevation: 80 m (260 ft)
- Time zone: UTC−5 (Eastern (EST))
  - Summer (DST): UTC−4 (EDT)
- Forward sortation area: K2C

Bel-Air Park (also spelled Bel Air Park) is a neighbourhood in College Ward in the west end of Ottawa, Ontario, Canada. It is bounded on the east by the Experimental Farm Pathway, on the south by Baseline Road, on the west by Woodroffe Avenue and on the north by the Queensway.

All of the homes were built between 1956 and 1958, and were built by the Campeau Corporation. The neighbourhood is home to Bel-Air Park on Berwick Avenue. Iris Street is the main road in the neighbourhood. Bel-Air Drive starts at Checkers Road and ends in Braemar Park on Garfield close to Maitland Drive. For schools there is Agincourt Public School, J. H. Putman Public School, St. Daniel's Catholic School, Torah Academy Jewish School (Formerly St. Andrew's Adult High School) located on Lazard Street, Charlotte Lemieux French School and Woodroffe High School.

The population of the neighbourhood is roughly 1700.

Along with Bel-Air Heights and Braemar Park, the area is part of the Bel-Air Community Association.
