= Braemar Park =

- Neighbourhood
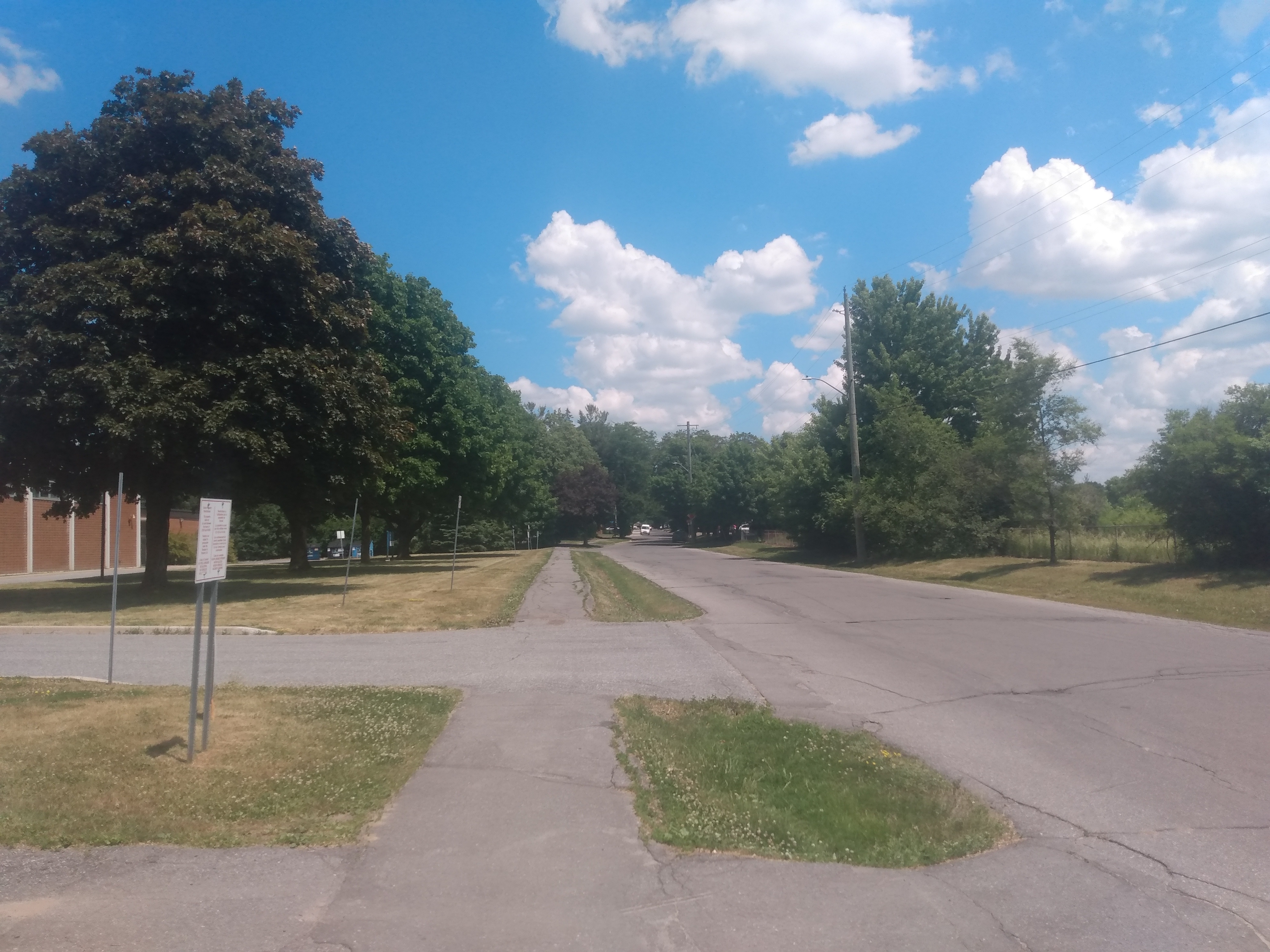
- Bel-Air Drive in front of J. H. Putman Public School

- Location in Ottawa
- Coordinates: 45.366861°N 75.757605°W
- Country: Canada
- Province: Ontario
- City: Ottawa

Government
  - MP: Anita Vandenbeld
  - MPP: Chandra Pasma
  - Councillor: Laine Johnson
  - Bel-Air Community Association Co-Presidents: Kathryn Loyen, Jean Mullan
- Elevation: 85 m (279 ft)
- Time zone: UTC−5 (Eastern (EST))
  - Summer (DST): UTC−4 (EDT)
- Forward sortation area: K2C

Braemar Park (French: Parc Braemar) is a neighbourhood in College Ward in the west end of Ottawa, Ontario, Canada. It is bounded on the north by the Queensway, east on Maitland Drive, south by the Central Experimental Pathway and west by J. H. Putman Public School.

Homes in the neighbourhood were built between the late 1950s and early 1960s. The initial development was on Riddell Ave South, with the neighbourhood nearly fully built by 1965. Most of the houses are middle- high class families. On Riddell Street South, there are some townhouses. Originally, Riddell Street started on Carling Avenue in Glabar Park. When highway 417 was built in 1967, the road split up and was called north and south. The road ended on Garfield Drive.

When the neighbourhood was under construction, it was included in the Bel-Air-Copeland Park Community Association, a homeowners association formed in 1965.

The west side of the neighbourhood contains Garfield Park and J. H. Putman Public School. Putman closed in 2019 due to low enrollment. The community is just off the bike path owned by the NCC.

The population of the neighbourhood is roughly 450.

Along with Bel-Air Park and Bel-Air Heights, the area is part of the Bel-Air Community Association.
