= Queensway Terrace South =

Coordinates: 45°20′43″N 75°47′05″W

- Neighbourhood
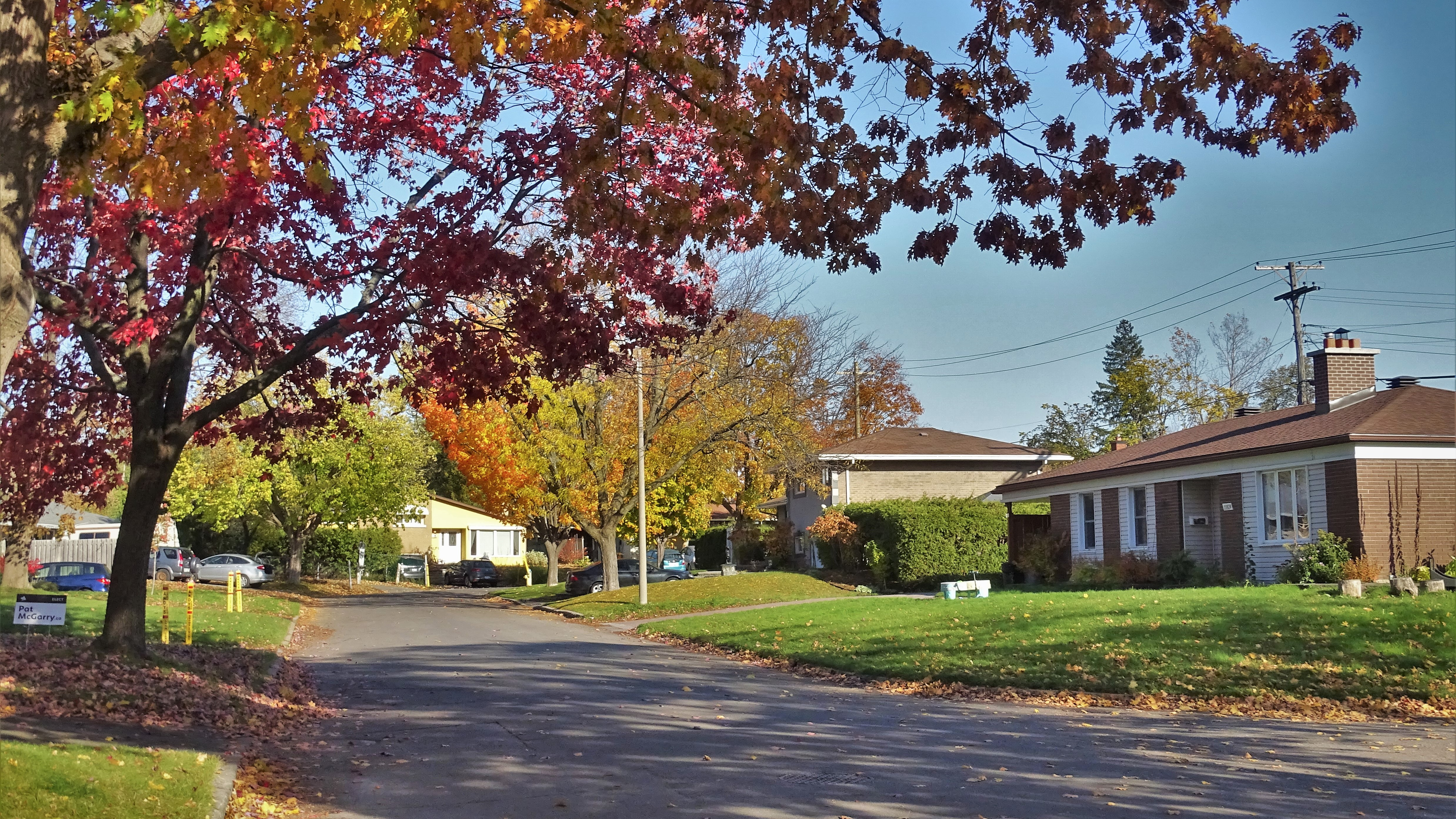
- Stanton Road
- Interactive map of Queensway Terrace South
- Country: Canada
- Province: Ontario
- City: Ottawa

Government
  - MPs: Anita Vandenbeld
  - MPPs: Chandra Pasma
  - Councillors: Laine Johnson

Area
  - Total: 0.43 km^{2} (0.17 sq mi)

Population (2021)
  - Total: 1,640
- Canada 2021 Census
- Time zone: UTC-5 (Eastern (EST))

Queensway Terrace South is a neighbourhood in College Ward in the west end of Ottawa, Ontario, Canada. It used to be part of Queensway Terrace but in 1967, Highway 417 was built and split apart into Queensway Terrace North and South. The borders are to the east Southwood Drive, to the south Baseline Road, Queensway (Highway 417) to the north and Greenbank Road to the west. Along with next-door Ridgeview, the neighbourhood is part of the Queensway Terrace South Ridgeview Community Association.

The community was established in the early 1960s along with Ridgeview, Parkway Park, Redwood and Qualicum.

On the west side of Pinecrest Road there are townhouses and a couple of high rise condominiums.

It is home to Pinecrest Public School and Pinecrest Shopping Centre. Pinecrest Shopping Centre was converted into box stores in 1998. Also on Baxter Drive there is a shopping strip with restaurants and take outs, the Ottawa Citizen, and other businesses.

It is also home to Kilreen Park.
