= Ridgemont High School (Ottawa) =

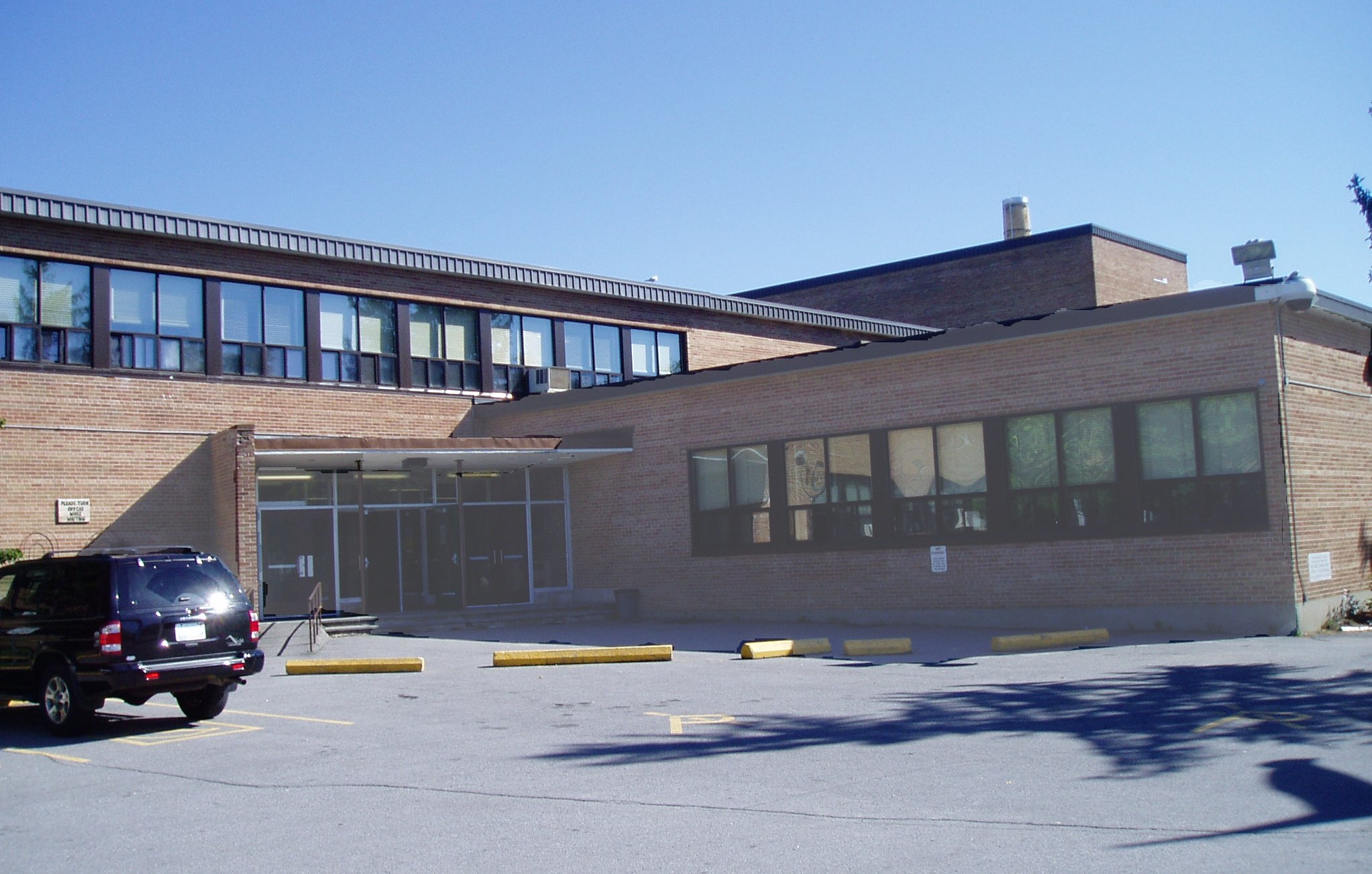
- Ridgemont High School

Location
- 2597 Alta Vista Drive; Ottawa, Ontario, K1V 7T3; Canada; 45.376035°N 75.659773°W

Information
- Motto: Knowledge is Power
- Founded: 1958
- School board: Ottawa Carleton District School Board
- Administrator: Ginette Roche
- Staff: 91 (2005)
- Grades: 9 to 12
- Enrollment: 850 (2005)
- Language: English and French
- Campus: Suburban
- Area: Ottawa South
- Colours: Green, White, Grey
- Mascot: Spartan
- Team name: Ridgemont Spartans
- Feeder schools: Roberta Bondar Public School, Alta Vista Public School, Featherston Public School, Elizabeth Park Public School, Blossom Park Public School Sawmill Creek Elementary Public School
- Website: ridgemonths.ocdsb.ca

Ridgemont High School is an Ottawa-Carleton District School Board secondary school in Ottawa, Ontario, Canada. The school is located at 2597 Alta Vista Drive in the Alta Vista neighbourhood of Ottawa. It is next door to St. Patrick's High School, a Roman Catholic high school, and Charles Hulse Elementary School, also in the OCDSB.

== History ==
Work began on Ridgemont in 1957 when Prime Minister John Diefenbaker laid the cornerstone. Under Principal J. B. Speers, the school opened the next year, one of a series of composite schools built by the Ottawa Collegiate Board during the 1950s and 1960s to deal with the baby boom and increasing school attendance. Ridgemont was planned and designed at the same time as Rideau High School and Laurentian High School. Ridgemont opened a year earlier than the other two.

The project generated some controversy as the Collegiate Board presented a plan that included an auditorium, double gym, and a cafeteria. The Ottawa Property Owners association objected to these as expensive and unneeded luxuries, and the mayor Charlotte Whitton agreed. The dispute delayed the construction of the school for some time.

In 1972, Ridgemont High School concert and stage bands produced an album.

Ridgemont is a semestered school offering many programs, such as French immersion, English as a Second Language, ECL (Everyday Community Living), and international languages (Somali, Arabic, Spanish).

Ridgemont derives the basis of its population from the surrounding neighbourhoods of Ottawa South. The Alta Vista, Ledbury, and South Keys areas of Ottawa South all feed into the school. Ridgemont is known for its high ethnic diversity: there are over 40 different languages spoken by the 850 students at the school.

Ridgemont's 50th Anniversary was celebrated on October 5 and 6, 2007, with a reunion of school alumni.

== Architecture ==
It was built at the same time as Laurentian High School and Rideau High School and has the same base design by architects Hazelgrove, Lithwick and Lambert with well-lit efficient circulation, and a large auditoria. The double gymnasium block projected into a large sports field and oval track. For adults, commercial and business classes were offered in the evenings. There are tennis courts, a large parking lot, well equipped science labs, an auto shop, a wood shop, a media lab and a library. There are two storey t-shaped wings for classrooms, with the gym, auditorium and cafeteria in bumped out blocks. The building was constructed of orange-buff brick with contrasting brick in perpendicular bars on the fly over the auditorium stage. At Ridgemont the auditorium stage fly was decorated at the corners in contrasting brick. There were horizontal bands of windows in silver aluminum, which were later retrofitted with tinted glass in brown anodized frames. An entrance forecourt is reached by a circular drive. The main door is through a vestibule set at an angle between a classroom wing and the cafeteria block. The school's most architecturally interesting feature is a smokestack with a heavy fire door at the base for cleaning out the ash and soot.

== Notable alumni ==
- Ian Affleck (1971), Professor, Physics and Astronomy, University of British Columbia
- Ian Beckstead (1977), CFL centre for Ottawa Rough Riders and Toronto Argonauts
- JW-Jones, award-winning blues singer
- Julie Nesrallah (1987) Opera Singer
- Colleen Peterson (1950–1996), member of 3's a Crowd, later notable solo Canadian singer-songwriter and member of Quartette; did not graduate.
- Tim Wynne-Jones (1967), multi award-winning author of children's literature.

== See also ==
- Education in Ontario
- List of schools in Ottawa
- List of high schools in Ontario
