= Pinecrest Public School =

Location
- 1281 McWatters Road; Ottawa, Ontario, K2C 3E7; Canada; 45°20′38″N 75°47′06″W

Information
- School type: Public, Elementary school
- Motto: Peace Respect Responsibility
- Religious affiliation: none
- Founded: 1961
- School board: Ottawa Carleton District School Board
- School number: 444936
- Principal: Wanda Mills-Boone
- Grades: JK-8
- Enrollment: 324 (September 2017)
- Language: English, French
- Campus: urban
- Colours: Green, Gold
- Mascot: Panther
- Team name: Pinecrest Panthers
- Communities served: Britannia Heights
- Feeder schools: Regina Public School, Severn Public School, and Grant Public School; Woodroffe High School.
- Website: www.pinecrestps.ocdsb.ca
- Last updated: 11 November 2017

Pinecrest Public School is a public elementary school in Ottawa, Ontario, Canada.

== History ==
Pinecrest Public School was built in 1961. The facilities include large, bright classrooms, two gymnasiums, a library, an art room, music room, a remodeled science room, a Design and Tech Room, a computer lab and two reading nooks. The schoolyard is used by grade 7-8 students for intramural/ sports activities and general play. The school has undergone renovations to the telephone, fire alarm and air conditioning/ heating system and added new play structures, basketball courts, and an upgraded multi-level soccer area. In addition, the front office was refurbished. The student support services include: custodians, Multicultural Liaison Officer, School Resource Police Officer, educational assistants and board specialists.

Pinecrest was the subject of a CBC Television documentary, The Pinecrest Diaries, featuring the work of Principal Charles Austin and his team of teachers: Jeremy Hannay, Laurel Piper-Tye and others. Pinecrest was part of another CBC Television Documentary called, Run Run Revolution this production followed 10 students, Bruce Hubbard, the Principal and coaches invited to the school to train for the children's portion of the Boston Marathon.

Principal Charles Austin was named one of Canada's Outstanding Principals by The Learning Partnership in 2006.
