= Ridgeview, Ottawa =

Coordinates: 45.348°N 75.779°W

Ridgeview
- Neighbourhood
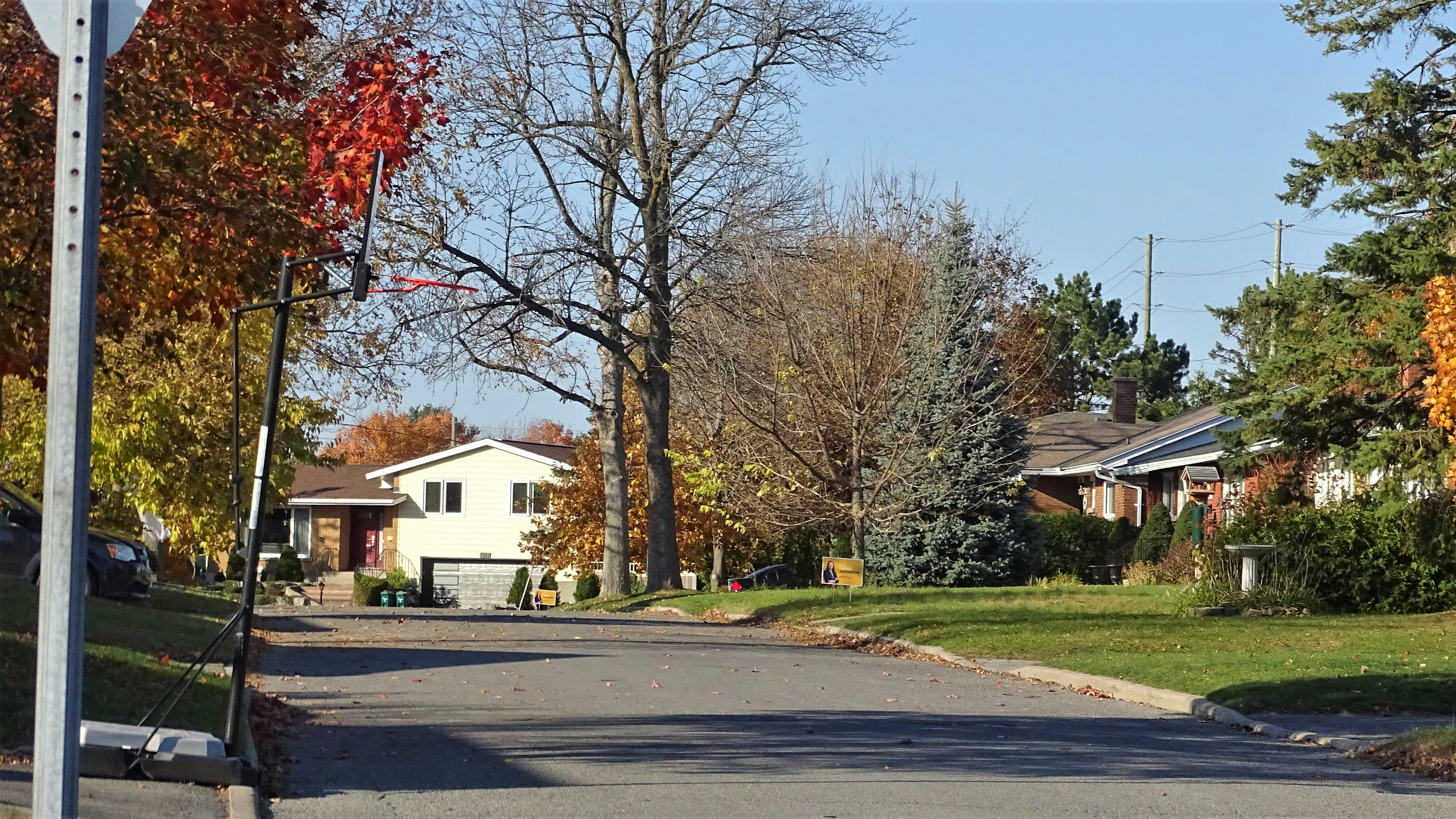
- Placid Street
- Interactive map of Ridgeview
- Country: Canada
- Province: Ontario
- City: Ottawa

Government
  - MPs: Anita Vandenbeld
  - MPPs: Chandra Pasma
  - Councillors: Laine Johnson

Area
  - Total: 0.59 km^{2} (0.23 sq mi)

Population (2021)
  - Total: 1,230
- Canada 2021 Census
- Time zone: UTC-5 (Eastern (EST))

Ridgeview is a neighbourhood in College Ward in the west end of Ottawa, Ontario, Canada. It is bordered to the south by Baseline Road, to the east by Cobden Road, to the North by the Queensway, and to the west by Southwood Drive. It was developed in the 1960s along with Parkway Park.

Ryan Drive and a portion of Iris Street are main transportation routes through the heart of the neighbourhood. Several of the streets are crescent shaped.

It is home to Our Lady of Victory Elementary School. Behind the school is Ridgeview Park. Nearby, Pinecrest Recreation Complex has been an active community hub for decades with a hockey rink, gym, and swimming pool. Just north of the recreation complex are several baseball diamonds and tennis courts.
