= International Knowledge Network of Women in Politics =

Online platform for women in politics

The International Knowledge Network of Women in Politics (iKNOW Politics) is an online workspace designed to serve the needs of elected officials, candidates, political party leaders and members, researchers, students and other practitioners interested in advancing women in politics.

== Goals ==
iKNOW Politics’ goal is to increase the participation and effectiveness of women in political life by utilizing a technology enabled forum to provide access to critical resources and expertise, stimulate dialogue, create knowledge, and share experiences on women's political participation.

== Activities ==
The iKNOW Politics website is an interactive tool that allows users and members worldwide to engage in a number of online activities gaining access to essential knowledge and information. The key iKNOW Politics features are the following:

- Expert Network: Members are provided the opportunity to ask questions and exchange information with experts in the field of women's political participation, through the unique online tool called “Ask the Experts.”
- News and Events: Users can access the latest information, news and events on women and politics that are compiled from global news outlets, project updates and member contributions.
- Resource Library: iKNOW Politics has an online library that includes more than 650 reports, handbooks and training materials from international agencies, research institutions, academia and civil society groups. Themes include governance and politics, including campaigns, elections and quotas, political parties, advocacy and lobbying, skills building, legislation and post-conflict and political transitions.
- Online Discussions: Online discussions are hosted on the issues related to women's political participation. It provides a free and unlimited space for sharing ideas, experiences, and knowledge useful for supporting women in their political paths.

== Steering Committee ==
The network, launched in February 2007, is a joint project of the United Nations Development Programme (UNDP), the United Nations Entity for Gender Equality and the Empowerment of Women (UN WOMEN), the National Democratic Institute for International Affairs (NDI), the Inter-Parliamentary Union (IPU) and the International Institute for Democracy and Electoral Assistance (IDEA).
