= Woodroffe High School (Ottawa) =

Location
- 2410 Georgina Drive; Ottawa, Ontario K2B 7M8; Canada; 45.3627°N 75.7797°W

Information
- School type: High School
- Motto: Floret qui laborat (He who labors flourishes)
- Founded: 1960
- Sister school: Woodroffe Avenue Public School
- School board: Ottawa Carleton District School Board
- Superintendent: Marva Major
- Area trustee: Wendy Hough
- School number: 613-820-7186
- Administrator: Tracy Speers
- Principal: Erin O'Grady
- Grades: 9—12
- Enrollment: 930 (2025)
- Language: English
- Campus: Suburban
- Colours: Orange and black
- Team name: Tigers
- Feeder schools: D. Roy Kennedy Public School, Pinecrest Public School, Fisher Park Public School, Agincourt Road Public School and Woodroffe Avenue Public School.
- Website: woodroffehs.ocdsb.ca

Woodroffe High School is a secondary school located in the west end of Ottawa, Ontario, Canada, situated at the western end of the Kichi Zibi Mikan near Lincoln Fields Station. The school is under the jurisdiction of the Ottawa-Carleton District School Board.

Woodroffe is noted for its French immersion and arts programs. These programs are showcased in Woodroffe's annual Dance Showcases and annual musicals hosted in the school's auditorium. Woodroffe has a strong athletics program, winning many championships over the years in sports such as basketball, volleyball, rugby, soccer, and hockey. A variety of school clubs, organizations and inter-school and intramural athletics are offered under the direction and supervision of teacher and community volunteers.

The school campus features two gymnasiums, tennis courts, basketball court, gravel running track, baseball diamond, and 3 multi-use sport fields.

== Notable alumni ==
- Taylor Benjamin (soccer player)
- Darren Joseph (football player)
- She Nay Nay (wrestler)
- Sonja Smits (actress)
- Mark Taylor (politician)

== See also ==
- Education in Ontario
- List of secondary schools in Ontario
