= Anita Vandenbeld =

Canadian politician (born 1971)

Anita Vandenbeld MP
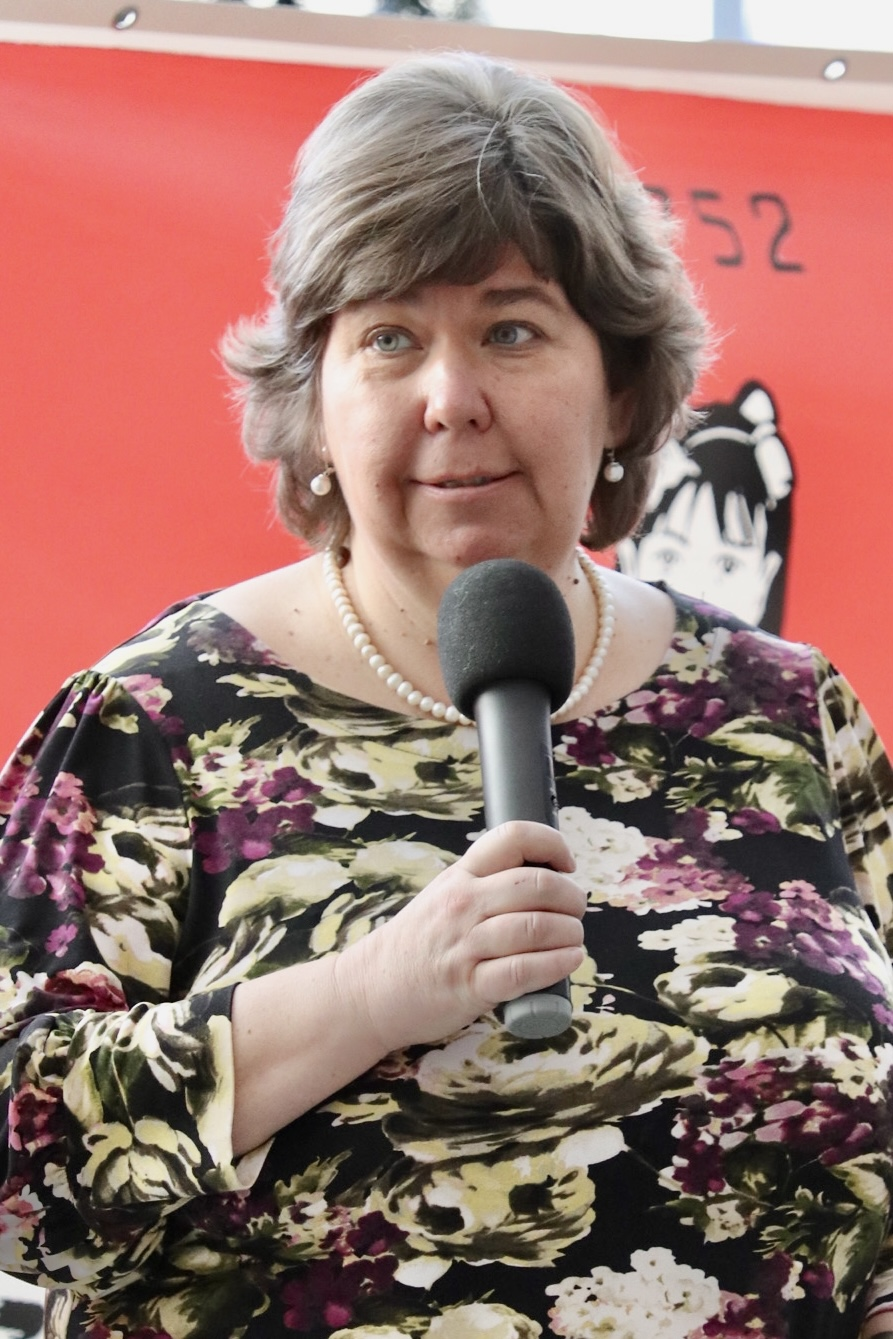

Member of Parliament for Ottawa West—Nepean
- Incumbent
- Assumed office October 19, 2015
- Preceded by: John Baird

Personal details
- Born: December 3, 1971 (age 54) Calgary, Alberta, Canada
- Party: Liberal
- Spouse: Don Dransfield
- Education: University of Calgary; York University

Anita M. Vandenbeld MP (born December 3, 1971) is a Canadian politician, who was elected to represent the riding of Ottawa West—Nepean for the Liberal Party of Canada in the House of Commons of Canada in the 2015 Canadian federal election. She was re-elected in the same riding in 2019, in 2021 and in 2025. Vandenbeld currently serves as Parliamentary secretary to the Minister of International Development.

== Early life and career ==
Vandenbeld was born and raised in Calgary, Alberta, in the neighbourhood of Bowness. She attended Assumption School and graduated from St. Francis High School in 1989. As a teen she worked as a page at the Bowness branch of the Calgary Public Library.

Vandenbeld's parents were immigrants from the Netherlands who built their own log home, in which she spent her early childhood. Her father was born in Deventer, the Netherlands in 1940 at the beginning of World War Two. In 1945, Herman Vandenbeld got his first candy from Canadian soldiers during the Liberation of the Netherlands. His family were union leaders who were part of the Dutch underground resistance during World War Two. His grandfather and uncle were political prisoners at the Herzogenbusch concentration camp "Kamp Vught". He was the eldest of a working-class family who arrived at Pier 21 in Halifax in 1960 with all their worldly possessions, including the bed that he slept in for 52 years of marriage to Anita's mother, Maria. He worked as a labourer for several years in Calgary before starting his piano tuning business which he ran with his wife Maria for 40 years. Vandenbeld's mother Maria was a kindergarten teacher who immigrated from the Netherlands at the age of 19. She met Anita's father while boarding with his family in Calgary.

Anita Vandenbeld was the first in her family to graduate from University. She attended the University of Calgary, earning a B.A. (Hon.), History and Political Science, and would later study at York University, receiving an M.A. in Political and Constitutional History in 1994. Vandenbeld was the President of the University of Calgary Young Liberals during her student years.

== International development career ==
Anita Vandenbeld worked for over a decade in international democratic development.

During the Chretien and Martin governments, Vandenbeld was Director of Parliamentary Affairs in the Office of the Leader of the Government in the House of Commons and oversaw the development and implementation of the Government of Canada's Democratic Reform Action Plan under the Minister responsible for Democratic Reform. She was also a Policy Analyst with the National Liberal Caucus Research Bureau in the Canadian Parliament, and Chief of staff to a Canadian Senator.

=== United Nations ===
Vandenbeld worked on several short and long-term projects with the United Nations Development Programme and UNIFEM. She worked with the United Nations Development Programme Democratic Governance Group in New York, where she managed a multi-partner international network to promote women's political participation International Knowledge Network of Women in Politics. Before that, she was based at the UNDP Oslo Governance Centre in Norway.

==== Politics ====
Vandenbeld was the global manager of the International Knowledge Network of Women in Politics (iKNOWPolitics.org), an online peer support network of women in politics which operates in 4 languages across 5 continents. iKNOWPolitics was established in 2007 as a project of 5 international organizations who decided to combine efforts to encourage women's political participation: United Nations Development Programme (UNDP), UNIFEM (now UN Women), Inter-Parliamentary Union (IPU), International IDEA, and the National Democratic Institute (NDI). Vandenbeld oversaw the project's Asia-Pacific launch in Jakarta, Indonesia in 2010, and partnered on a project with the Club de Madrid on 'Women's Leadership for Peace and Security in the Horn of Africa'.

In 2009 Vandenbeld oversaw the expansion of the project into Arabic, including traveling extensively across the region to consult with women about the arabic network and host a regional launch in Jordan in 2009 with Princess Basma Bint Talal as the keynote speaker and female MPs, Ministers, opposition members and civil society leaders from across the Arab States.

=== National Democratic Institute ===
Anita Vandenbeld has worked with the National Democratic Institute in a number of different roles, including as resident director in the Democratic Republic of Congo, conducting a women's political leadership academy in Haiti. contributing case studies on political party policy development, and as one of the five initial partners in the iKNOWPolitics project.

==== Democratic Republic of Congo Resident Director ====
Vandenbeld was resident director in the National Democratic Institute office in the Democratic Republic of the Congo where she established a political party program during the November 2011 Congolese elections. Vandenbeld conducted a women's campaign college for over 100 women and hosted a launch of the iKNOWPolitics network with over 250 women leaders, candidates, activists and representatives of women's organizations. Vandenbeld led a program of inter-party dialogue to support peaceful competition in elections. She established a steering committee of 15 majority, opposition and unaligned political parties that met weekly in the months leading to the 2011 national elections. Under her leadership, the Institute organized multiparty workshops on communications, campaign management and women’s political involvement to help parties’ participation in the elections.

As part of the political parties program, Vandenbeld invited former US ambassador to the UN and former Governor of New Mexico, Bill Richardson to meet with Congolese political leaders to prevent election-related violence, assure transparency in the election process and continue democratic dialogue after the election The delegation met with President Kabila, and convened a meeting of 11 presidential candidates. One of the key outcomes of these meetings included a declaration on sexual violence that was developed by civil society and signed by most of the presidential candidates.

=== Organization for Security and Cooperation in Europe ===
Anita Vandenbeld worked in both Bosnia and Herzegovina (BiH) and in Kosovo with the Organization for Security and Cooperation in Europe. In the OSCE Mission in BiH she coordinated an anti-corruption campaign during the 2000 national elections. This extensive public awareness campaign included television and radio commercials, a music video, billboards, factsheets and newspaper advertisements. The project also included a training course on investigative journalism. In Kosovo, Vandenbeld was a senior advisor to the Assembly of Kosovo in 2007 and 2008 before Kosovo declared independence on February 17, 2008.

==== OSCE Mission in Kosovo ====
Anita Vandenbeld was Senior Advisor and Deputy Chief of the Central Assembly and Political Parties Section of the Organization for Security Cooperation in Europe Mission in Kosovo The project included support to the Assembly of Kosovo in developing a professional secretariat, supporting committees in review of draft legislation, technical advice and support to the women's caucus, and a new member orientation (induction) program following the 2007 elections. Vandenbeld was also an advisor to the Independent Oversight Board of Kosovo which acted as an independent public service tribunal to end nepotism and promote a professional public service.

=== The Parliamentary Centre ===
Anita Vandenbeld worked on parliamentary strengthening in the Balkans with the Ottawa-based Parliamentary Centre, a Canadian non-profit, non-partisan organization that provides support to parliaments around the world. As part of the South East Europe Parliamentary Program (SEPP) Vandenbeld was responsible for the Parliamentary Centre's programming in Bosnia and Herzegovina (BiH), and assisted with the related program in Serbia to establish an office of an Auditor General in Belgrade.

== Political career ==
On November 28, 2010, Vandenbeld won a contested nomination to be the Liberal Party of Canada candidate for Ottawa West-Nepean for the 2011 Canadian federal election. Vandenbeld was defeated by MP and Minister of Foreign Affairs John Baird.

Since being elected, Vandenbeld holds weekly 'mini-Town Hall' coffee hours on Friday evenings open to all constituents. These were initially held at a local Tim Hortons and are now held virtually because of the pandemic.

Vandenbeld again sought the Ottawa West-Nepean federal Liberal nomination for the 2015 Canadian federal election, winning a contested nomination against two other candidates on November 2, 2014. Her election campaign was successful, winning the seat with 56% of the vote on October 19, 2015. Her 35,199 votes represented the 5th highest vote total of any Liberal candidate in Ontario and the highest vote count for a female candidate in Ontario. In her first term, Vandenbeld sat on the Standing Committee on Procedure and House Affairs, the Standing Committee on the Status of Women, the Standing Committee on Foreign Affairs and International Development and on the Standing Committee on Access to Information, Privacy and Ethics. While on the Foreign Affairs committee Vandenbeld put forward amendments to strengthen the Arms Trade Treaty, and initiated a study of Canada's International Democracy Promotion. Vandenbeld was also the founding chair of the all-party Democracy Caucus.

From 2015 to 2018 Vandenbeld was the Chair of the National Liberal Women's Caucus and she helped to re-establish the all-party women's caucus. One of her first activities as chair of the parliamentary women's caucus was to host the first-ever indigenous blanket ceremony for reconciliation on Parliament Hill. Vandenbeld also mentored future women candidates through weekly phone calls.

=== Chair of Special Committee on Pay Equity ===
In March 2016, Vandenbeld was elected as Chair of the Special Committee on Pay Equity, which was formed by a motion in the House of Commons to close the gap in pay between men and women which contributes to income inequality and discriminates against women, accept pay equity as a human right, and accept the recommendations of the 2004 Pay Equity Task Force Report. The final report, which had a consensus of all parties, called "It's Time to Act" was tabled on June 9, 2016. As a result, the government appointed the first Pay Equity Commissioner and passed Pay Equity legislation which comes into force August 31, 2021.

=== Chair of the Sub-committee on International Human Rights ===
Vandenbeld was chair of the House of Commons Sub-committee on International Human Rights. During her tenure as chair, the subcommittee undertook a major study of the human rights situation of the Uyghurs which ultimately led to a resolution in the Canadian Parliament declaring that the treatment of the Uyghur people in China constitutes a genocide, The subcommittee issued a second report in 2020 for which it was formally sanctioned by China. Other major studies completed while Vandenbeld chaired the subcommittee include the 'Global State of the Free Press' and 'Women Human Rights Defenders'. The report on women human rights defenders recommended a special immigration stream for human rights and democracy advocates under persecution around the world. This resulted in the Government establishing a new refugee stream for up to 250 human rights defenders and their families annually, with a special focus on journalists, women and LGBTI activists. As chair, Vandenbeld also initiated an annual recognition of women human rights champions.

=== Ethics Inquiry ===
Vandenbeld was investigated in 2018 by the Ethics Commissioner for possible violation of the Conflict of Interest Code for Members of the House of Commons during the 2018 Ottawa municipal election campaign by endorsing her husband. The commissioner recommended that "no sanction be imposed because it was apparent to me that Ms. Vandenbeld’s failure to comply with section 11 of the Code occurred through an error in judgment made in good faith. She had made significant efforts to comply with the rules that she had considered, namely the Members By-law of the House of Commons’ Board of Internal Economy. She expressed a sincere belief that running for public office did not engage private interests. She also immediately stopped all of her campaign activities upon seeking and obtaining my advice in October 2018."

== Second term as MP ==
On July 29, 2018 Anita Vandenbeld was nominated as the candidate for re-election in the 2019 Canadian federal election by the Liberal Party of Canada. She was elected with 45.6% of the votes. In her second term, Vandenbeld sat on the House of Commons sub-committee on International Human Rights and the Standing Committee on National Defence.

On December 12, 2019, Vandenbeld was appointed by the Prime Minister as the Parliamentary Secretary to the Minister of National Defence.

== Third term as MP ==
On December 3, 2021, Vandenbeld was appointed by the Prime Minister as Parliamentary secretary to the Minister of International Development.

Vandenbeld is the nominated candidate for the Federal Liberal party for Ottawa West-Nepean for the next federal election.

=== Views on Palestine ===
On March 18, 2024 Vandenbeld abstained from vote 658 - Canada's actions to promote peace in the middle east. Originally penned as a bid to recognize the state of Palestine, the non-binding but symbolic NDP motion was heavily edited in negotiations with the Liberals, allowing it to pass 204 to 117. Anita Vandenbeld abstained from the vote which 146 of her liberal colleagues, including the Prime Minister supported. In a statement on twitter, Vandenbeld explained that she was unavailable to vote because of personal reasons that had nothing to do with the text of the motion. In correspondence with constituents Vandenbeld stated that if she had been able to vote, she would have voted in favour of the motion. Vandenbeld has called for a sustainable ceasefire in Gaza, stating "All parties to the conflict have an obligation to allow and facilitate the rapid and unimpeded access of humanitarian relief for civilians. Canada calls for a resumption of humanitarian pauses, and it supports urgent international efforts toward a sustainable ceasefire. Throughout, we have based our decisions on the innocent civilians involved in this conflict. As the situation continues, it is vital that life-saving humanitarian relief can reach Palestinian civilians in need."

=== Status of Women committee ===
On July 31, 2024, Vandenbeld intervened in a House of Common committee hearing on violence against women to talk about abortion, leading to both witnesses storming out of the hearing, one of them in tears. According to CBC, "both witnesses eventually left the meeting in a visible state of distress." Vandenbeld issued a statement regretting the "distress that this meeting caused the witnesses", which fell short of the apology the witnesses sought. In an op-ed Vandenbeld penned in National News Watch on August 6, 2024, Vandenbeld stated "Last week, the chair not only called a meeting on Intimate Partner Violence unilaterally with only a few days notice, but she also invited only witnesses to testify that were proposed by Conservative party members, denying other parties the right to submit names. One of the witnesses, a survivor of intimate partner violence, said she flew from California to attend the meeting. But her name was only added to the meeting agenda one hour before the meeting began. During the meeting, many parliamentary rules were broken, including allowing witnesses to show “props” – in this case photos, allowing private video footage to be taken while the meeting was in session, not ensuring that Members could speak in the order in which they put up their hands, not overruling points of order that were unrelated to procedural issues, allowing yelling and disruption in the room, and more. This kind of chaos is, in my view, part of a larger strategy of discrediting our institutions in the eyes of the public. Members are left in the difficult position of either allowing the rules to be broken, or calling it out and being vilified and gaslit through a very effective Conservative communications war machine that uses emotion to manipulate...In my focus on trying to save our committee from the same dysfunction and partisanship that has plagued other committees, I played a role in adding to their trauma and for that I am very sorry. Nothing that happened in that meeting should ever have happened."

== Electoral record ==
2025 Canadian federal election: Ottawa West—Nepean
Party	Candidate	Votes	%	±%
Liberal	Anita Vandenbeld	43,555	63.64	+18.22
Conservative	Ryan Telford	18,517	27.05	–0.61
New Democratic	Josh Bizjak	4,847	7.08	–13.13
Green	Prashanta Dhakal	780	1.14	–1.75
People's	Glen Armstrong	514	0.75	–2.45
Christian Heritage	Sean Mulligan	232	0.34	-0.17
Total valid votes		68,445	99.29	
Total rejected ballots		492	0.71	-0.05
Turnout		68,937	72.25	+3.62
Eligible voters		95,412		
Liberal notional hold		Swing		+9.41
Source: Elections Canada

2021 Canadian federal election: Ottawa West—Nepean
Party	Candidate	Votes	%	±%	Expenditures
Liberal	Anita Vandenbeld	25,889	45.1	-0.5	$74,328.64
Conservative	Jennifer Jennekens	16,473	28.7	+1.6	$45,178.66
New Democratic	Yavar Hameed	11,163	19.4	+0.7	$32,726.98
People's	David Yeo	1,908	3.3	+2.0	$1,796.57
Green	David Stibbe	1,642	2.9	-3.4	$5,093.29
Christian Heritage	Sean Mulligan	327	0.6	–	$2,649.96
Total valid votes/expense limit		57,402	–	–	$115,138.30
Total rejected ballots		447			
Turnout		57,849			
Eligible voters		84,392			
Source: Elections Canada

2019 Canadian federal election: Ottawa West—Nepean
Party	Candidate	Votes	%	±%	Expenditures
Liberal	Anita Vandenbeld	27,599	45.6	-10.08	$70,538.89
Conservative	Abdul Abdi	16,491	27.1	-2.78	none listed
New Democratic	Angela MacEwen	11,401	18.7	+8.9	$61,020.24
Green	David Stibbe	3,823	6.3	+3.5	none listed
People's	Serge Guevorkian	820	1.3	–	$0.00
Christian Heritage	Sean Mulligan	350	0.6	-0.57	$2,235.59
Total valid votes/expense limit		62,206	100.0		$109,420.82 EST
Total rejected ballots		602	0.96	–	
Turnout		62,808	72.62	–	
Eligible voters		86,485			
Liberal hold		Swing		+14.11%	
Source: Elections Canada

2015 Canadian federal election: Ottawa West—Nepean
Party	Candidate	Votes	%	±%	Expenditures
Liberal	Anita Vandenbeld	35,199	55.68	+24.19	–
Conservative	Abdul Abdi	18,893	29.88	-14.81	–
New Democratic	Marlene Rivier	6,195	9.80	-9.98	–
Green	Mark Brooks	1,772	2.80	-1.24	–
Christian Heritage	Rod Taylor	740	1.17	–	–
Marxist–Leninist	Sam Heaton	114	0.18	–	–
Total valid votes/Expense limit		62,913	100.0		$218,107.39
Total rejected ballots		307	0.49	–	
Turnout		63,220	75.99	–	
Eligible voters		83,195			
Liberal gain from Conservative		Swing		+19.5%	
Source: Elections Canada

2011 Canadian federal election: Ottawa West—Nepean
Party	Candidate	Votes	%	±%	Expenditures
Conservative	John Baird	25,226	44.71	-0.27	–
Liberal	Anita Vandenbeld	17,790	31.53	-4.59	–
New Democratic	Marlene Rivier	11,128	19.72	+8.20	–
Green	Mark Mackenzie	2,279	4.04	-2.32	–
Total valid votes/Expense limit		56,423	100.00		–
Total rejected ballots		292	0.51	–	
Turnout		56,715	69.42	–	
Eligible voters		81,693	–	–	
Conservative hold		Swing		-2.43	

== Other activities ==
=== Volunteer positions and boards ===
Anita Vandenbeld is a member of the steering committee of the World Movement for Democracy, a global network of civil society activists, scholars, parliamentarians, thought leaders, journalists and funders who are committed to advancing democracy.

Vandenbeld is a founding member of the Parliamentarian Rapid Response Team (PARRT) of Parliamentarians for Global Action.

Vandenbeld was also a board member at the Parliamentary Centre, a non-partisan non-governmental Canadian organizations dedicated to supporting inclusive and accountable democratic institutions.

Vandenbeld was a founding board member of the Centre for Democratic and Participatory Governance in Brussels.

Vandenbeld also volunteered as chapter development chair for Equal Voice, a Canadian multi-partisan organization to promote women in politics.

=== Awards and medals ===
In 2008, Anita Vandenbeld was awarded the Canadian Peacekeeping Service Medal for her work in Kosovo.

Anita Vandenbeld was a recipient of the 2021 Esprit de Corps 'Breaking Down the Barricades - Top Women in Defence' award.

Anita Vandenbeld is a recipient of the 'Leading Women-Leading Girls' community service award.

=== Publications ===
Anita Vandenbeld is a contributing author to the Oxford Handbook of Transnational Feminist Movements having written the chapter on 'International Trends in Women's Political Participation'.

Anita Vandenbeld contributed a chapter on women's political participation to the book 'Turning Parliament Inside Out: Practical Ideas for reforming Canada's democracy'.

As part of the Cambridge Viet-Nam Women's Leadership Programme, Anita Vandenbeld co-authored the UNDP publication 'Women's Representation in the National Assembly of Viet Nam: The Way Forward'.

Anita Vandenbeld contributed to several other United Nations Development Program (UNDP) and UNIFEM publications, including:

- 'Enhancing Youth Political Participation throughout the Electoral Cycle: A Good Practice Guide'

- 'A Users Guide to Measuring Gender Sensitive Basic Service Delivery'.

- 'Enhancing Women's Political Participation: A Policy Note for Europe and the Commonwealth of Independent States'

As chair of the Canada-Kosovo Parliamentary Friendship Group, Anita Vandenbeld hosted a reception on Parliament Hill bringing together Kosovo refugees who arrived in Canada in 1999, and the Canadians who helped them to settle here. Their stories were published by the Embassy of Kosovo in a book called 'Sure Shores'.

During her work with the OSCE Mission in Kosovo Vandenbeld contributed to the publication 'Independent Agencies and Institutions in Kosovo Democracy'. and authored an article for LawNow Magazine entitled 'Imposing Legitimacy: The Dilemma of International Democratic Development'

Anita Vandenbeld contributed to the National Democratic Institute publication 'Political Parties and Democracy in Theoretical and Practical Perspectives: Developing Party Policies'.
